= List of accolades received by Bugonia (film) =

Accolades received by 2026 film

Bugonia accolades
- Emma Stone (left) and Jesse Plemons (right) received several accolades for their performances.
Accolades
Award	Wins	Nominations
Academy Awards	0	4
Actor Awards	0	2
ADG Excellence in Production Design Awards	0	1
Alliance of Women Film Journalists Awards	0	2
American Cinema Editors Eddie Awards	0	1
American Film Institute Awards	1	1
Artios Awards	0	1
Astra Creative Arts Awards	0	1
Astra Film Awards	0	5
Austin Film Critics Association Awards	1	3
British Academy Film Awards	0	5
British Film Designers Guild Awards	1	1
Capri Hollywood International Film Festival Awards	1	1
CineFest Miskolc International Film Festival Awards	0	1
Costume Designers Guild Awards	0	1
Critics' Choice Awards	0	3
Critics' Choice Super Awards	0	3
Dallas–Fort Worth Film Critics Association Awards	2	2
Denver Film Critics Society Awards	1	3
Días de Cine Awards	1	1
Dublin Film Critics' Circle Awards	1	1
European Film Awards	1	6
Film Critics Circle of Australia Awards	0	1
Florida Film Critics Circle Awards	0	1
Georgia Film Critics Association Awards	1	1
Golden Globe Awards	0	3
Golden Trailer Awards	1	3
Gotham Awards	0	1
Hollywood Music in Media Awards	0	1
Houston Film Critics Society Awards	0	2
International Film Music Critics Association Awards	0	1
Irish Film & Television Awards	1	4
Kansas City Film Critics Circle Awards	0	1
Las Vegas Film Critics Society Awards	1	4
London Film Critics' Circle Awards	0	1
Make-Up Artists & Hair Stylists Guild Awards	0	2
Montclair Film Festival Awards	2	2
New York Film Critics Online Awards	0	3
Online Film Critics Society Awards	0	2
Polish Film Awards	0	1
Producers Guild of America Awards	0	1
Property Masters Guild MacGuffin Awards	0	1
Robert Awards	0	1
San Diego Film Critics Society Awards	2	3
San Francisco Bay Area Film Critics Circle Awards	0	3
San Sebastián International Film Festival Awards	0	1
Satellite Awards	0	5
Saturn Awards	0	2
Savannah Film Festival Awards	2	2
Seattle Film Critics Society Awards	0	2
Set Decorators Society of America Awards	0	1
Society of Composers & Lyricists Awards	0	1
St. Louis Film Critics Association Awards	0	1
Venice International Film Festival Awards	1	2
Washington D.C. Area Film Critics Association Awards	0	1
Women's Image Network Awards	0	1
Writers Guild of America Awards	0	1

Totals (Note: Certain award groups do not simply award one winner. They acknowledge several different recipients, have runners-up, and have third place. Since this is a specific recognition and is different from losing an award, runner-up mentions are considered wins in this award tally. For simplification and to avoid errors, each award in this list has been presumed to have had a prior nomination.)
- Wins: 21
- Nominations: 112

Bugonia is a 2025 science fiction and black comedy film directed by Yorgos Lanthimos and written by Will Tracy. It is an English-language remake of the South Korean film Save the Green Planet! (2003) by the writer-director Jang Joon-hwan. Bugonia follows two conspiracy theorists (Jesse Plemons and Aidan Delbis) who kidnap the CEO of a major pharmaceutical company (Emma Stone), believing that she is secretly an alien who wants to destroy Earth.

The film premiered at the 82nd Venice International Film Festival on August 28, 2025, and was theatrically released in the United States on October 24, 2025, by Focus Features. It grossed $43.8 million worldwide against a production budget of $55 million. Bugonia was met with critical acclaim, with praise for its performances, (Note: References:) screenplay, (Note: References:) direction, (Note: References:) and musical score. (Note: References:) On the review aggregator website Rotten Tomatoes, it holds an approval rating of 87% based on 343 reviews.

At the 98th Academy Awards, Bugonia received four nominations: Best Picture, Best Actress (Stone), Best Adapted Screenplay (Tracy), and Best Original Score (Jerskin Fendrix). It garnered five nominations at the 79th British Academy Film Awards, including Best Direction (Lanthimos), and three nominations at the 83rd Golden Globe Awards, including Best Motion Picture – Musical or Comedy, with Stone and Plemons receiving acting nominations at both ceremonies. The film received three nominations at the 31st Critics' Choice Awards, including Best Picture, and a nomination for Best Theatrical Motion Picture at the 37th Producers Guild of America Awards. Stone and Plemons were also nominated at the 32nd Actor Awards, and Tracy was nominated for his screenplay at the 78th Writers Guild of America Awards. The American Film Institute selected Bugonia as one of the top-ten films of 2025.

== Accolades ==
Accolades received by Bugonia (film)
Award	Date	Category	Recipient(s)	Result	Ref(s).
Academy Awards	March 15, 2026	Best Picture	Ed Guiney, Andrew Lowe, Yorgos Lanthimos, Emma Stone, and Lars Knudsen	Nominated	
Academy Awards	March 15, 2026	Best Actress	Emma Stone	Nominated	
Academy Awards	March 15, 2026	Best Adapted Screenplay	Will Tracy	Nominated	
Academy Awards	March 15, 2026	Best Original Score	Jerskin Fendrix	Nominated	
Actor Awards	March 1, 2026	Outstanding Performance by a Male Actor in a Leading Role	Jesse Plemons	Nominated	
Actor Awards	March 1, 2026	Outstanding Performance by a Female Actor in a Leading Role	Emma Stone	Nominated	
ADG Excellence in Production Design Awards	February 28, 2026	Excellence in Production Design for a Contemporary Film	James Price	Nominated	
Alliance of Women Film Journalists Awards	December 31, 2025	Best Actress	Emma Stone	Nominated	
Alliance of Women Film Journalists Awards	December 31, 2025	Best Adapted Screenplay	Will Tracy	Nominated	
American Cinema Editors Eddie Awards	February 27, 2026	Best Edited Feature Film – Comedy, Theatrical	Yorgos Mavropsaridis	Nominated	
American Film Institute Awards	January 9, 2026	Top 10 Motion Pictures of the Year	Bugonia	Won	
Artios Awards	February 26, 2026	Outstanding Achievement in Casting in Feature Big Budget – Drama	Jennifer Venditti and Alan Scott Neal	Nominated	
Astra Creative Arts Awards	December 11, 2025	Best Stunt Coordinator	Thom Khoury Williams	Nominated	
Astra Film Awards	January 9, 2026	Best Motion Picture – Comedy or Musical	Bugonia	Nominated	
Astra Film Awards	January 9, 2026	Best Actor in a Motion Picture – Comedy or Musical	Jesse Plemons	Nominated	
Astra Film Awards	January 9, 2026	Best Actress in a Motion Picture – Comedy or Musical	Emma Stone	Nominated	
Astra Film Awards	January 9, 2026	Best Adapted Screenplay	Will Tracy	Nominated	
Astra Film Awards	January 9, 2026	Best Young Performer	Aidan Delbis	Nominated	
Austin Film Critics Association Awards	December 18, 2025	Best Film	Bugonia	10th Place	
Austin Film Critics Association Awards	December 18, 2025	Best Actress	Emma Stone	Nominated	
Austin Film Critics Association Awards	December 18, 2025	Best Adapted Screenplay	Will Tracy and Jang Joon-hwan	Nominated	
British Academy Film Awards	February 22, 2026	Best Director	Yorgos Lanthimos	Nominated	
British Academy Film Awards	February 22, 2026	Best Actor in a Leading Role	Jesse Plemons	Nominated	
British Academy Film Awards	February 22, 2026	Best Actress in a Leading Role	Emma Stone	Nominated	
British Academy Film Awards	February 22, 2026	Best Adapted Screenplay	Will Tracy	Nominated	
British Academy Film Awards	February 22, 2026	Best Original Score	Jerskin Fendrix	Nominated	
British Film Designers Guild Awards	March 6, 2026	Major Motion Picture – Fantasy	Bugonia	Finalist	
Capri Hollywood International Film Festival Awards	January 5, 2026	Best Actress	Emma Stone	Won	
CineFest Miskolc International Film Festival Awards	September 13, 2025	Emeric Pressburger – Best Film	Bugonia	Nominated	
Costume Designers Guild Awards	February 12, 2026	Excellence in Costume Design for a Contemporary Film	Jennifer Johnson	Nominated	
Critics' Choice Awards	January 4, 2026	Best Picture	Bugonia	Nominated	
Critics' Choice Awards	January 4, 2026	Best Actress	Emma Stone	Nominated	
Critics' Choice Awards	January 4, 2026	Best Adapted Screenplay	Will Tracy	Nominated	
Critics' Choice Super Awards	August 6, 2026	Best Science Fiction/Fantasy Movie	Bugonia	Nominated	
Critics' Choice Super Awards	August 6, 2026	Best Actor in a Science Fiction/Fantasy Movie	Jesse Plemons	Nominated	
Critics' Choice Super Awards	August 6, 2026	Best Actress in a Science Fiction/Fantasy Movie	Emma Stone	Nominated	
Dallas–Fort Worth Film Critics Association Awards	December 17, 2025	Best Picture	Bugonia	9th Place	
Dallas–Fort Worth Film Critics Association Awards	December 17, 2025	Best Actress	Emma Stone	4th Place	
Denver Film Critics Society Awards	January 23, 2026	Best Sci-Fi Film	Bugonia	Won	
Denver Film Critics Society Awards	January 23, 2026	Best Actress	Emma Stone	Nominated	
Denver Film Critics Society Awards	January 23, 2026	Best Adapted Screenplay	Will Tracy	Nominated	
Días de Cine Awards	January 27, 2026	Best International Actor	Jesse Plemons	5th Place	
Dublin Film Critics' Circle Awards	December 18, 2025	Best Actress	Emma Stone	Won	
European Film Awards	January 17, 2026	Best Director	Yorgos Lanthimos	Nominated	
European Film Awards	January 17, 2026	Best Editor	Yorgos Mavropsaridis	Nominated	
European Film Awards	January 17, 2026	Best Production Designer	James Price	Nominated	
European Film Awards	January 17, 2026	Best Makeup and Hairstyling	Torsten Witte	Won	
European Film Awards	January 17, 2026	Best Composer	Jerskin Fendrix	Nominated	
European Film Awards	January 17, 2026	Best Sound Designer	Johnnie Burn	Nominated	
Film Critics Circle of Australia Awards	February 11, 2026	David Stratton Award for Best International Film	Yorgos Lanthimos	Nominated	
Florida Film Critics Circle Awards	December 19, 2025	Best Adapted Screenplay	Will Tracy	Nominated	
Georgia Film Critics Association Awards	December 27, 2025	Oglethorpe Award for Excellence in Georgia Cinema	Yorgos Lanthimos and Will Tracy	Runner-up	
Golden Globe Awards	January 11, 2026	Best Motion Picture – Musical or Comedy	Bugonia	Nominated	
Golden Globe Awards	January 11, 2026	Best Actor in a Motion Picture – Musical or Comedy	Jesse Plemons	Nominated	
Golden Globe Awards	January 11, 2026	Best Actress in a Motion Picture – Musical or Comedy	Emma Stone	Nominated	
Golden Trailer Awards	May 28, 2026	Most Original Trailer	Bugonia ("Alien")	Nominated	
Golden Trailer Awards	May 28, 2026	Best Comedy TrailerByte for a Feature Film	Bugonia (Digital Campaign)	Nominated	
Golden Trailer Awards	May 28, 2026	Best Thriller TrailerByte for a Feature Film	Bugonia (Good Luck Social)	Won	
Gotham Awards	December 1, 2025	Best Feature	Ari Aster, Ed Guiney, Lars Knudsen, Jerry Kyoungboum Ko, Yorgos Lanthimos, Miky Lee, Andrew Lowe, and Emma Stone	Nominated	
Hollywood Music in Media Awards	November 19, 2025	Best Original Score in a Feature Film	Jerskin Fendrix	Nominated	
Houston Film Critics Society Awards	January 20, 2026	Best Picture	Bugonia	Nominated	
Houston Film Critics Society Awards	January 20, 2026	Best Actress	Emma Stone	Nominated	
International Film Music Critics Association Awards	February 26, 2026	Best Original Score for a Fantasy/Science Fiction Film	Jerskin Fendrix	Nominated	
Irish Film & Television Awards	February 20, 2026	Best International Film	Bugonia	Nominated	
Irish Film & Television Awards	February 20, 2026	Best International Actor	Jesse Plemons	Nominated	
Irish Film & Television Awards	February 20, 2026	Best International Actress	Emma Stone	Won	
Irish Film & Television Awards	February 20, 2026	Best Cinematography	Robbie Ryan	Nominated	
Kansas City Film Critics Circle Awards	December 21, 2025	Best Actress	Emma Stone	Nominated	
Las Vegas Film Critics Society Awards	December 19, 2025	Best Picture	Bugonia	8th Place	
Las Vegas Film Critics Society Awards	December 19, 2025	Best Actor	Jesse Plemons	Nominated	
Las Vegas Film Critics Society Awards	December 19, 2025	Best Actress	Emma Stone	Nominated	
Las Vegas Film Critics Society Awards	December 19, 2025	Best Adapted Screenplay	Bugonia	Nominated	
London Film Critics' Circle Awards	February 1, 2026	British or Irish Film of the Year	Bugonia	Nominated	
Make-Up Artists & Hair Stylists Guild Awards	February 14, 2026	Best Contemporary Make-Up in a Feature-Length Motion Picture	Torsten Witte	Nominated	
Make-Up Artists & Hair Stylists Guild Awards	February 14, 2026	Best Contemporary Hair Styling in a Feature-Length Motion Picture	Torsten Witte	Nominated	
Montclair Film Festival Awards	October 26, 2025	Best Film (Junior Jury)	Bugonia	Won	
Montclair Film Festival Awards	October 18, 2025	Screenwriter Award	Will Tracy	Won	
New York Film Critics Online Awards	December 15, 2025	Best Actor	Jesse Plemons	Nominated	
New York Film Critics Online Awards	December 15, 2025	Best Actress	Emma Stone	Nominated	
New York Film Critics Online Awards	December 15, 2025	Best Screenplay	Bugonia	Nominated	
Online Film Critics Society Awards	January 26, 2026	Best Actress	Emma Stone	Nominated	
Online Film Critics Society Awards	January 26, 2026	Best Adapted Screenplay	Bugonia	Nominated	
Polish Film Awards	March 9, 2026	Best European Film	Bugonia	Nominated	
Producers Guild of America Awards	February 28, 2026	Best Theatrical Motion Picture	Ed Guiney, Andrew Lowe, Yorgos Lanthimos, Emma Stone, and Lars Knudsen	Nominated	
Property Masters Guild MacGuffin Awards	September 12, 2026	Best Property Master for a Fantasy / Science Fiction Feature Film	Ben Hopwood	Nominated	
Robert Awards	January 31, 2026	Best English Language Film	Bugonia	Nominated	
San Diego Film Critics Society Awards	December 15, 2025	Best Director	Yorgos Lanthimos	Runner-up	
San Diego Film Critics Society Awards	December 15, 2025	Best Actress	Emma Stone	Nominated	
San Diego Film Critics Society Awards	December 15, 2025	Best Adapted Screenplay	Will Tracy	Won	
San Francisco Bay Area Film Critics Circle Awards	December 14, 2025	Best Actress	Emma Stone	Nominated	
San Francisco Bay Area Film Critics Circle Awards	December 14, 2025	Best Adapted Screenplay	Bugonia	Nominated	
San Francisco Bay Area Film Critics Circle Awards	December 14, 2025	Best Original Score	Jerskin Fendrix	Nominated	
San Sebastián International Film Festival Awards	September 27, 2025	Audience Award	Bugonia	Nominated	
Satellite Awards	March 10, 2026	Best Motion Picture – Comedy or Musical	Bugonia	Nominated	
Satellite Awards	March 10, 2026	Best Actor in a Motion Picture – Comedy or Musical	Jesse Plemons	Nominated	
Satellite Awards	March 10, 2026	Best Actress in a Motion Picture – Comedy or Musical	Emma Stone	Nominated	
Satellite Awards	March 10, 2026	Best Adapted Screenplay	Will Tracy	Nominated	
Satellite Awards	March 10, 2026	Best Makeup & Hair	Torsten Witte, Liz Phillips, and Albert Elizondo	Nominated	
Saturn Awards	March 8, 2026	Best Science Fiction Film	Bugonia	Nominated	
Saturn Awards	March 8, 2026	Best Actress	Emma Stone	Nominated	
Savannah Film Festival Awards	October 28, 2025	Variety's Artisans to Watch	Jennifer Venditti	Won	
Savannah Film Festival Awards	October 28, 2025	Variety's Artisans to Watch	Torsten Witte	Won	
Seattle Film Critics Society Awards	December 15, 2025	Best Picture	Bugonia	Nominated	
Seattle Film Critics Society Awards	December 15, 2025	Best Actress	Emma Stone	Nominated	
Set Decorators Society of America Awards	February 21, 2026	Best Achievement in Decor/Design of a Contemporary Feature Film	James Price and Prue Howard	Nominated	
Society of Composers & Lyricists Awards	February 6, 2026	Outstanding Original Score for a Studio Film	Jerskin Fendrix	Nominated	
St. Louis Film Critics Association Awards	December 14, 2025	Best Actress	Emma Stone	Nominated	
Venice International Film Festival Awards	September 6, 2025	Golden Lion	Yorgos Lanthimos	Nominated	
Venice International Film Festival Awards	September 6, 2025	Green Drop Award	Yorgos Lanthimos (Note: Tied with Ildikó Enyedi for Silent Friend)	Won	
Washington D.C. Area Film Critics Association Awards	December 7, 2025	Best Adapted Screenplay	Bugonia	Nominated	
Women's Image Network Awards	November 9, 2025	Best Actress in a Feature Film	Emma Stone	Nominated	
Writers Guild of America Awards	March 8, 2026	Best Adapted Screenplay	Will Tracy	Nominated	
