= Bugonia (soundtrack) =

Bugonia (Original Motion Picture Soundtrack)

Film score by Jerskin Fendrix
- Released: October 31, 2025
- Recorded: 2025
- Studio: AIR Studios, London
- Genre: Film score
- Length: 55:59
- Label: Milan
- Producer: Jerskin Fendrix

Jerskin Fendrix chronology
Kinds of Kindness (2024)	Bugonia (2025)

Bugonia (Original Motion Picture Soundtrack) is the film score to the 2025 film Bugonia directed by Yorgos Lanthimos starring Emma Stone, Jesse Plemons, Aidan Delbis, Stavros Halkias, and Alicia Silverstone. The film score is composed by Jerskin Fendrix and released through Milan Records on October 31, 2025.

== Development ==
Pianist and composer Jerskin Fendrix reteamed with Lanthimos consecutively for the third time after Poor Things (2023) and Kinds of Kindness (2024). When he discussed about the film with Lanthimos in mid-2023, the latter did not give him the complete script, but instead told him three words "bees, basement and spaceship" and gave him a year to write music based on this, only after which he could read the full script or see the final edit as well. Researching on the three words, he developed new sounds and ideas at the space of his toilet.

Fendrix wrote detailed orchestral demos and sent to Lanthimos for feedback. The musical pieces he wrote were fully integrated into the film and in the perspective of Teddy's approach. He noted that Lanthimos' approach put him in the same headspace as Teddy without being aware of it. Unaware of it, Fendrix wrote "adolescent, thrashing, bombastic music" which reflected Teddy's angst on being alone and paranoid.

Fendrix then conducted and recorded a 90-piece orchestra in a single room at the AIR Studios in London, because he wanted to refrain from stems that would give emphasis for specific instruments. He worked with a "phenomenal group of musicians" from the London Contemporary Orchestra "who are conservatory level but also very willing to embarrass themselves, and to try stuff that's not really possible on their instruments." This meant that he used to take advantage of odd "mistakes" which led him to generate unusual discordant sounds that suited the state of emotions oscillating in the characters' heads, like the woodwinds being played out of their range to a point where it overblows or cracks.

Fendrix also had an idea of how orchestra should be played and considered this to be a kind of "very exacting, precise standard" and open-minded approach, though the musicians apprehended it, knowing that it did not work; Fendrix also denoted that approach considering the repertoire that went on for centuries and had an influence of Ludwig van Beethoven, Gustav Mahler and Igor Stravinsky, hence, refraining the pastiche was a tough challenge.

== Release ==
The soundtrack was released through Milan Records on October 31, 2025.

== Reception ==
Nikki Baughan of Screen International wrote "The score from composer Jerskin Fendrix (returning from Poor Things and Kinds Of Kindness) amps up this unease. Working with the London Symphony Orchestra, he melds traditional swelling strings with grittier, edgier tones, speaking both to Teddy's heroic ambitions and the dirty truths that lie underneath." John Nugent of Empire called it "part-majestic, part-discordant", while David Rooney of The Hollywood Reporter called it a "high-drama score."

Justin Chang of The New Yorker wrote "every menacing thrum of the score, by Jerskin Fendrix, escalates the intensity of Stone and Plemons's bravura showdown." Shirley Li of The Atlantic wrote "composer Jerskin Fendrix's thudding, metronomic score contributes to the film's oppressive atmosphere." Hannah Strong of Little White Lies noted that Fendrix "pulls in favours from John Williams' classic Close Encounters of the Third Kind score". Peter Bradshaw of The Guardian called it "an intestine-shreddingly clamorous orchestral score from Jerskin Fendrix".

Travis Jeppesen British Film Institute wrote "The biggest element of overkill, however, is the gratuitous use of Jerskin Fendrix's melodramatic score, which becomes a crutch used to punctuate each and every dramatic moment!" Tori Brazier of Metro wrote "Jerskin Fendrix's hugely dramatic orchestral score – deployed expertly with flourishes at the most unexpected moments – is another example of this, composed entirely from just four key words provided by Lanthimos and no film reference. It's as absurd and inspired as the rest of the film."

== Track listing ==
No.	Title	Length
1.	"Bees"	4:45
2.	"Basement"	5:25
3.	"Star Saliva / Industry"	5:19
4.	"Resurrectionem"	2:13
5.	"Phantom Resurrectionem"	5:15
6.	"Grand Cycle"	1:21
7.	"Tell Teddy I'm Sorry"	1:11
8.	"Grand Tango"	1:48
9.	"Eclipse Reveille"	3:31
10.	"Ambulance Exit"	1:11
11.	"Spaceship"	1:59
12.	"Where Have All the Flowers Gone?" (Marlene Dietrich)	3:39
13.	"Saliva Antifreeze"	3:06
14.	"History of Earth"	5:29
15.	"CCD"	9:47
Total length:		55:59

== Personnel ==
Credits adapted from Film Music Reporter:

- Music composer, producer and conductor: Jerskin Fendrix
- Performer: London Contemporary Orchestra
- Additional music production: William Carkeet
- Score supervision: SixtyFour Music
- Music supervisors: Anne Booty, Joe Rice
- Orchestrator: Hugh Brunt
- LCO orchestra manager: Amy Elisabeth-Hinds
- LCO assistant orchestra manager: Cath Welsby
- LCO recording project manager: Cassandra Gurling
- Additional orchestration and copyist: Ananda Chatterjee
- Recording studios: AIR Studios, London
- Score engineer: Fiona Cruickshank
- Assistant engineers: Rebecca Hordern, Eve Morris
- Score recordist: Jack Mills
- Music editor: Graeme Stewart (supervising), William Carkeet
- Head of studios: Charlotte Matthews
- Studio coordinator: Katy Jackson
- AIR management: Lucy Matthews, Just Pickles

== Release history ==
Release history and formats for Bugonia (Original Motion Picture Soundtrack)
Region	Date	Format(s)	Label(s)	Ref.
Various	October 31, 2025	Digital download; streaming	Milan Records	
Various	December 19, 2025	LP	Waxwork Records	

== Accolades ==
Award	Date of ceremony	Category	Recipient(s)	Result	Ref.
Hollywood Music in Media Awards	November 19, 2025	Best Original Score in a Feature Film	Jerskin Fendrix	Pending	
