= Kinds of Kindness (soundtrack) =

Kinds of Kindness (Original Motion Picture Soundtrack)

Film score by Jerskin Fendrix
- Released: June 21, 2024
- Recorded: 2023–2024
- Studio: Angel Recording Studios, London
- Genre: Film score
- Length: 46:58
- Label: Milan
- Producer: Jerskin Fendrix

Jerskin Fendrix chronology
Poor Things (2023)	Kinds of Kindness (2024)	Once Upon a Time... In Shropshire (2025)

Kinds of Kindness (Original Motion Picture Soundtrack) is the film score to the 2024 film Kinds of Kindness directed by Yorgos Lanthimos. The musical score is composed by Jerskin Fendrix in his sophomore scoring stint and released through Milan Records on June 21, 2024.

== Development ==
The musical score for Kinds of Kindness is composed by Jerskin Fendrix in his second feature as a composer, after working with the same director on Poor Things. He received the offer in late-2022, when he worked on the final recording and mixing of Poor Things, and visited the sets of the film's shooting that held at New Orleans for a cameo where Lanthimos provided a suggestion for the musical landscape that involved only piano and choir, unlike the electronic and processed score for Poor Things.

Fendrix attributed the difficulties of writing the score from an emotional point of view, which is "usually quite a big feeling, and then working out the best way of expressing that, very concisely or very exaggeratedly." When he read the script, he really struggled the characters' emotions and motivations and even discussed with the co-actor Jesse Plemons who shared his experiences on navigating into the bizarre psychological landscape. Because of which, he attempted into a new direction where he tried to think about the space between the emotions. Hence, for the piano pieces, he wanted to explore the spaces between the emotions were very empty and absent and with the choir pieces, he wanted to explore the spaces which were very saturated and noisy and insanity-inducing which he considered the main principle.

Fendrix played the piano where the segments ranged from classically styled to slightly dissonant to insistent single-note repetition. He further played the piano in a hotel scene with Plemons, which was named as "Hotel Cheval". For the choral material, he sought words from co-writer Efthimis Filippou who wrote a series of poems dealing with human body parts and body horror. Those poems were rendered by the 24-member choir from London that conveyed several moods and ranged from medieval to strangely modern and often unsettling sounds. Fendrix wrote around four hours of piano music, along with much of the choral material being made into the final edit. The end titles song "King Lear" had no connection with the score, and is a demo of the song which was made for Fendrix's second studio album Once Upon a Time... In Shropshire released during October 2025.

== Reception ==
Wendy Ide of The Guardian wrote "the score, by Jerskin Fendrix, is admirably daring, combining discordant piano that sounds as though it was played by fighting cats, with hilariously portentous choral interludes." Justin Chang of The New Yorker wrote "The music, composed by Jerskin Fendrix, proves similarly repetitive, an unvaried string of ominously plinking piano notes." Yasmin Omar of Curzon Film wrote "Jerskin Fendrix's score, comprising piano keys hammering discordantly together and a choir droning ominously like bees in a hive, is used sparingly, and unnervingly." David Ehrlich of IndieWire wrote "Jerskin Fendrix's spare musical accompaniment allows Kinds of Kindness to maintain the same torpid rhythm from start to finish (there's a lot of chanting)."

== Track listing ==
No.	Title	Artist(s)	Length
1.	"The Death of R.M.F."		3:01
2.	"Sweet Dreams (Are Made of This)" (Remastered)	Eurythmics; Annie Lennox; Dave Stewart	3:39
3.	"Hotel Cheval"		3:13
4.	"Hymn - Matia Ponos Stoma Fthonos"		2:58
5.	"How Deep Is Your Love"	Margaret Qualley	2:27
6.	"R.M.F. is Flying"		1:35
7.	"Le Marteau"		2:04
8.	"Maritime Achievement Awards"		2:01
9.	"Kindness (Dream)"		2:13
10.	"Hymn - Matia Vlemma Stoma Psema"		2:12
11.	"Rainbow in the Dark"	Dio	4:16
12.	"R.M.F. Eats a Sandwich"		0:46
13.	"Dream (Pool)"		1:25
14.	"The Little One"		1:47
15.	"Kindness (Pool)"		0:50
16.	"Hymn - Me Skotosan Oloi Oi Chori"		2:37
17.	"Brand New Bitch"	Cobrah	3:17
18.	"King Lear" (Demo)		6:38
Total length:			46:58

== Personnel ==
Credits adapted from liner notes.

- Music composer, producer and piano: Jerskin Fendrix
- Music editors: Burn, Carroll, Graeme Stewart
- Assistant music editor: Joseph Stewart
- Recording and mixing: Graeme Stewart
- Choir: London Voices
- Choir conductor: Ben Parry
- Language coach: Theano Papadaki
- Recording studio: Angel Recording Studios
- Score engineer: John Barrett
- Assistant engineers: George Oulton, Tom Ashpitel
- Studio runner: Mario Simanovsky
- Music librarian: Jill Streater
- Score supervisor: Alexandre Putman

== Release history ==
Release history and formats for Kinds of Kindness (Original Motion Picture Soundtrack)
Region	Date	Format(s)	Label(s)	Ref.
Various	June 21, 2024	Digital download; streaming	Milan Records	
Various	November 1, 2024	LP	Waxwork Records	

== Accolades ==
Accolades for Kinds of Kindness (Original Motion Picture Soundtrack)
Awards	Date of ceremony	Category	Recipient	Result	Ref.
World Soundtrack Awards	16 October 2024	Best Composer of the Year	Jerskin Fendrix (Note: also for Poor Things)	Won	
