= Crescenta Valley High School =

Location
- 2900 Community Avenue; La Crescenta, California 91214; United States; 34°13′24″N 118°14′35″W

Information
- Type: Public secondary
- Motto: Pride, Tradition, And Honor
- Established: 1960
- School district: Glendale Unified School District
- Principal: Christine Benitez
- Teaching staff: 104.40 (FTE)
- Grades: 9–12
- Enrollment: 2,643 (2019-20)
- Student to teacher ratio: 24.98
- Campus: Suburban
- Colors: Navy and Columbia blue
- Athletics conference: CIF Southern Section Pacific League
- Mascot: Falcon
- Website: cvhs.gusd.net

Crescenta Valley High School is a high school in La Crescenta-Montrose, California, United States. Approximately 2500 students attend the school, which serves the northern portion of the city of Glendale, unincorporated La Crescenta and Montrose, as well as a neighborhood on the western end of the city of La Cañada Flintridge.

Crescenta Valley received a California Pivotal Practice award in 2022, National Blue Ribbon School award in 2000, and a California Distinguished School award in 2005. Crescenta Valley received a Bravo Award for excellence in the arts from Los Angeles County in 2005. CVHS was awarded again by the California Department of Education in 2019 with California Distinguished School with Exemplary Programs in Arts Education, and Physical Activity and Nutrition. In 2012, the school made headlines after a 15-year-old male student jumped off the roof, committing suicide.

== Notable alumni ==
- Trevor Bell, MLB pitcher
- Billy Booth, child actor, Dennis the Menace, and lawyer
- Natalia Cigliuti, television and movie actor
- Bethany Cosentino, guitarist and vocalist of Best Coast
- Aidan Delbis, actor, Bugonia
- Brian Goorjian, former professional basketball player and current coach
- Michelle Greco, WNBA champion, played with the Seattle Storm
- Brad Holland, NBA player
- Tom Holmoe, 4x Super Bowl winning safety for the 49ers and current BYU Athletic Director
- Steve Howey, actor
- Mike Hull, NFL player
- John Huh, pro golfer
- Nada Kawar, Olympic athlete for Jordan
- Eric Lloyd, child actor and producer
- Jasun Martz, record producer, composer, and fine artist
- Harvey Mason Jr., award-winning music and film producer
- Jacqueline Nguyen, United States circuit Judge of the United States court of appeals for the ninth circuit
- Mike Norseth, NFL quarterback
- Bill Slayback, baseball player for Detroit Tigers (1972–1974)
- Tinashe, singer
- Nafla, Korean-American rapper
- Wil Wheaton, actor, known for Star Trek: The Next Generation
- Steven Zaillian, Academy Award-winning screenwriter
