= List of awards and nominations received by Yorgos Lanthimos =

Yorgos Lanthimos awards and nominations
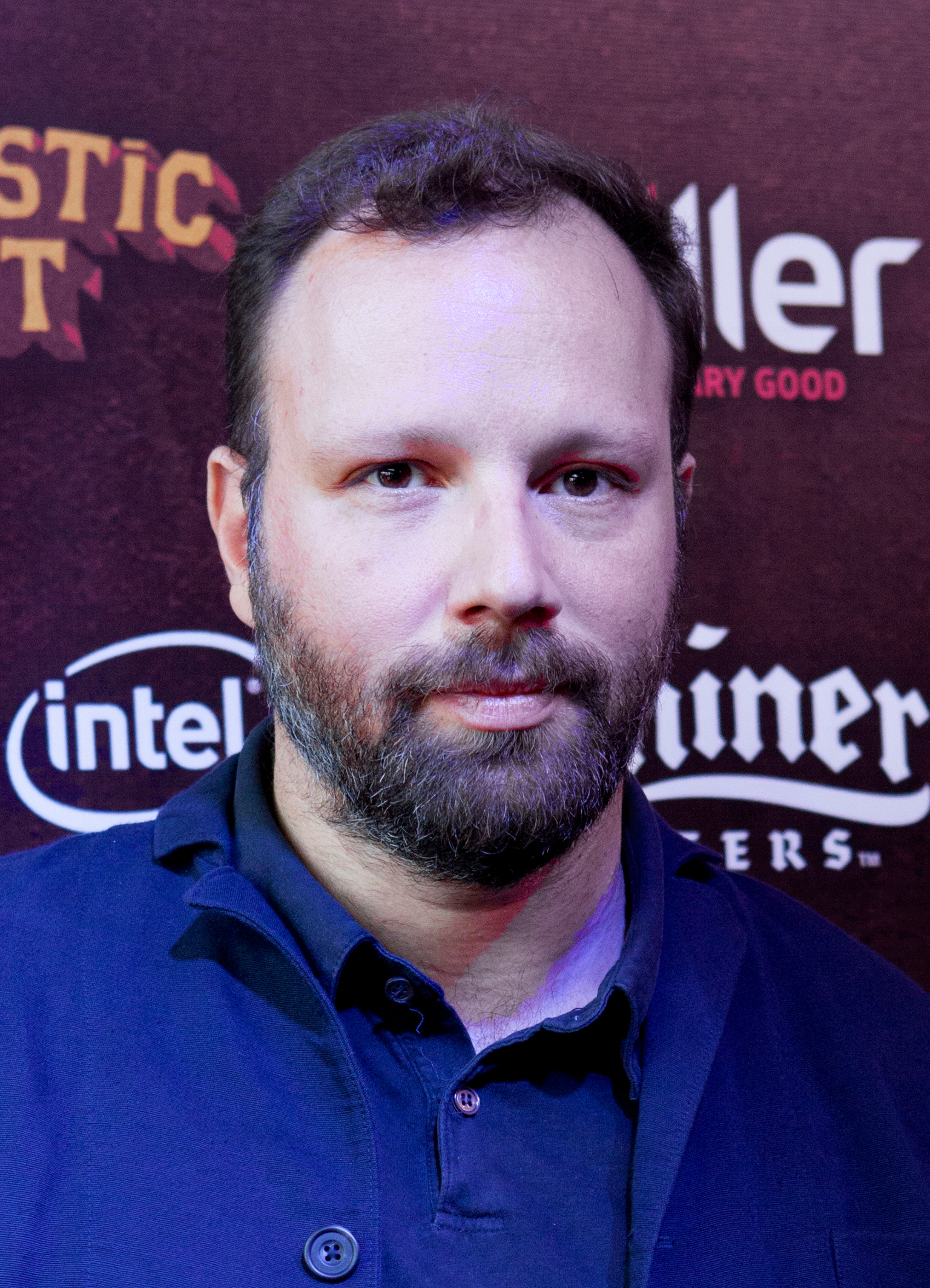
- Lanthimos in 2015
Awards and nominations
Award	Wins	Nominations
Academy Awards	0	6
BAFTA Awards	1	7
Critics' Choice	0	4
Golden Globes	0	1

Totals (Note: Certain award groups do not simply award one winner. They acknowledge several different recipients, have runners-up, and have third place. Since this is a specific recognition and is different from losing an award, runner-up mentions are considered wins in this award tally. For simplification and to avoid errors, each award in this list has been presumed to have had a prior nomination.)
- Wins: 32
- Nominations: 67

Yorgos Lanthimos is a Greek filmmaker. Known for his absurdist, eccentric, and disturbing films, he is often described as one of the most preeminent talents of his generation. (Note: Attributed to multiple sources.) He has received various accolades including a BAFTA Award as well as nominations for six Academy Awards, four Critics' Choice Awards, and a Golden Globe Award. His films have competed at the Cannes Film Festival and the Venice International Film Festival, where he has won four prizes and two prizes respectively. He has also received two British Independent Film Awards, and four European Film Awards as well as nominations for two Gotham Awards, an Independent Spirit Award, and three Producers Guild of America Awards.

After making directorial debut in 2001 Lanthimos gained attention for his absurdist psychological drama film Dogtooth (2009) which was won the Prix Un Certain Regard at the 2009 Cannes Film Festival and was nominated for the Academy Award for Best International Feature Film. He directed another psychological drama Alps (2011) which won the Golden Osella for Best Screenplay at the 68th Venice International Film Festival. Lanthimos directed his first English-language film, the absurdist black comedy The Lobster (2015) which won the Jury Prize at the 2015 Cannes Film Festival and earned nominations for the Academy Award for Best Original Screenplay and the BAFTA Award for Outstanding British Film. With psychological horror film The Killing of a Sacred Deer (2017) he received the Cannes Film Festival Award for Best Screenplay.

Lanthimos gained mainstream success with the black comedy costume drama The Favourite (2018), his first collaboration of many with actress Emma Stone, earned him the Grand Jury Prize at the 75th Venice International Film Festival and the BAFTA Award for Outstanding British Film as well as Academy Award nominations for the Best Picture and Best Director. He was Oscar–nominated in the same categories for his second collaboration with Emma Stone in the Gothic fantasy Poor Things (2023), in addition to the Golden Lion win at the 80th Venice International Film Festival, and a nomination for the Golden Globe for Best Director. Lanthimos reunited with Stone for the third time in his anthology film, Kinds of Kindness (2024) which competed for the Palme d'Or at the 2024 Cannes Film Festival.

== Major associations ==
=== Academy Awards ===
Year	Category	Nominated work	Result	Ref.
2016	Best Original Screenplay	The Lobster	Nominated	
2018	Best Picture	The Favourite	Nominated	
2018	Best Director	The Favourite	Nominated	
2023	Best Picture	Poor Things	Nominated	
2023	Best Director	Poor Things	Nominated	
2025	Best Picture	Bugonia	Nominated	

=== BAFTA Awards ===
Year	Category	Nominated work	Result	Ref.
2015	Outstanding British Film	The Lobster	Nominated	
2018	Best Film	The Favourite	Nominated	
2018	Outstanding British Film	The Favourite	Won	
2018	Best Direction	The Favourite	Nominated	
2023	Best Film	Poor Things	Nominated	
2023	Outstanding British Film	Poor Things	Nominated	
2025	Best Direction	Bugonia	Nominated	

=== Cannes Film Festival ===
Year	Category	Nominated work	Result	Ref.
2009	Un Certain Regard	Dogtooth	Won	
2009	Prix de la Jeunesse	Dogtooth	Won	
2015	Palme d'Or	The Lobster	Nominated	
2015	Jury Prize	The Lobster	Won	
2015	Queer Palm - Special Mention	The Lobster	Won	
2017	Palme d'Or	The Killing of a Sacred Deer	Nominated	
2017	Best Screenplay	The Killing of a Sacred Deer	Won	
2024	Palme d'Or	Kinds of Kindness	Nominated	

=== Critics' Choice Awards ===
Year	Category	Nominated work	Result	Ref.
Critics' Choice Awards
2018	Best Picture	The Favourite	Nominated	
2018	Best Director	The Favourite	Nominated	
2023	Best Picture	Poor Things	Nominated	
2023	Best Director	Poor Things	Nominated	

=== Golden Globe Awards ===
Year	Category	Nominated work	Result	Ref.
2023	Best Director	Poor Things	Nominated	

=== Venice Film Festival ===
Year	Category	Nominated work	Result	Ref.
2011	Golden Lion	Alps	Nominated	
2011	Golden Osella for Best Screenplay	Alps	Won	
2018	Golden Lion	The Favourite	Nominated	
2018	Queer Lion	The Favourite	Nominated	
2018	Grand Jury Prize	The Favourite	Won	
2023	Golden Lion	Poor Things	Won	
2025	Golden Lion	Bugonia	Nominated	

== Miscellaneous accolades ==
Organizations	Year	Category	Work	Result	Ref.
British Independent Film Awards	2010	Best Foreign Film	Dogtooth	Nominated	
British Independent Film Awards	2015	Best British Independent Film	The Lobster	Nominated	
British Independent Film Awards	2015	Best Director	The Lobster	Nominated	
British Independent Film Awards	2015	Best Screenplay	The Lobster	Nominated	
British Independent Film Awards	2015	Producer of the Year	The Lobster	Nominated	
British Independent Film Awards	2018	Best British Independent Film	The Favourite	Won	
British Independent Film Awards	2018	Best Director	The Favourite	Won	
Dublin International Film Festival	2010	Best Director	Dogtooth	Won	
European Film Awards	2015	Best Film	The Lobster	Nominated	
European Film Awards	2015	Best Director	The Lobster	Nominated	
European Film Awards	2015	Best Screenwriter	The Lobster	Won	
European Film Awards	2017	Best Director	The Killing of a Sacred Deer	Nominated	
European Film Awards	2017	Best Screenwriter	The Killing of a Sacred Deer	Nominated	
European Film Awards	2019	Best Film	The Favourite	Won	
European Film Awards	2019	Best Comedy	The Favourite	Won	
European Film Awards	2019	Best Director	The Favourite	Won	
European Film Awards	2025	Best Director	Bugonia	Nominated	
Evening Standard British Film Awards	2015	Best Film	The Lobster	Nominated	
Gotham Awards	2018	Best Feature	The Favourite	Nominated	
Gotham Awards	2025	Best Feature	Bugonia	Nominated	
Hellenic Film Academy Awards	2009	Best Film	Dogtooth	Won	
Hellenic Film Academy Awards	2009	Best Director	Dogtooth	Won	
Hellenic Film Academy Awards	2009	Best Screenplay	Dogtooth	Won	
Hellenic Film Academy Awards	2011	Best Film	Attenberg	Nominated	
Hellenic Film Academy Awards	2012	Best Screenplay	Alps	Nominated	
Hellenic Film Academy Awards	2016	Best Foreign Film	The Lobster	Won	
Independent Spirit Awards	2019	Best International Film	The Favourite	Nominated	
Lisbon & Estoril Film Festival	2009	Grande Premio	Dogtooth	Won	
Producers Guild of America	2019	Best Theatrical Motion Picture	The Favourite	Nominated	
Producers Guild of America	2024	Best Theatrical Motion Picture	Poor Things	Nominated	
Producers Guild of America	2026	Best Theatrical Motion Picture	Bugonia	Nominated	
Sarajevo Film Festival	2009	Special Prize of the Jury	Dogtooth	Won	
Sitges Film Festival	2009	Citizen Kane Award for Best Directorial Revelation	Dogtooth	Won	
Stockholm International Film Festival	2009	Bronze Horse	Dogtooth	Won	
Sydney Film Festival	2011	Official Competition Prize for New Directions in Cinema	Alps	Won	
Thessaloniki International Film Festival	2005	Golden Alexander	Kinetta	Nominated	
Telluride Film Festival	2023	Silver Medallion	Yorgos Lanthimos	Won	

== Critics awards ==
Organizations	Year	Category	Work	Result	Ref.
Belgian Film Critics Association	2016	Grand Prix	The Lobster	Nominated	
Los Angeles Film Critics Association	2016	Best Screenplay	The Lobster	Won	
London Film Critics' Circle	2016	British / Irish Film of the Year	The Lobster	Nominated	
Online Film Critics Society	2015	Best Non-U.S. Films	The Lobster	Won	
