= Fendrix =

Fendrix may refer to:

- Fendrix (drug), a brand name for a Hepatitis B vaccine
- Jerskin Fendrix (Joscelin Dent-Pooley), English musician and composer
