= Aidan Delbis =

American actor (born 2005 or 2006)

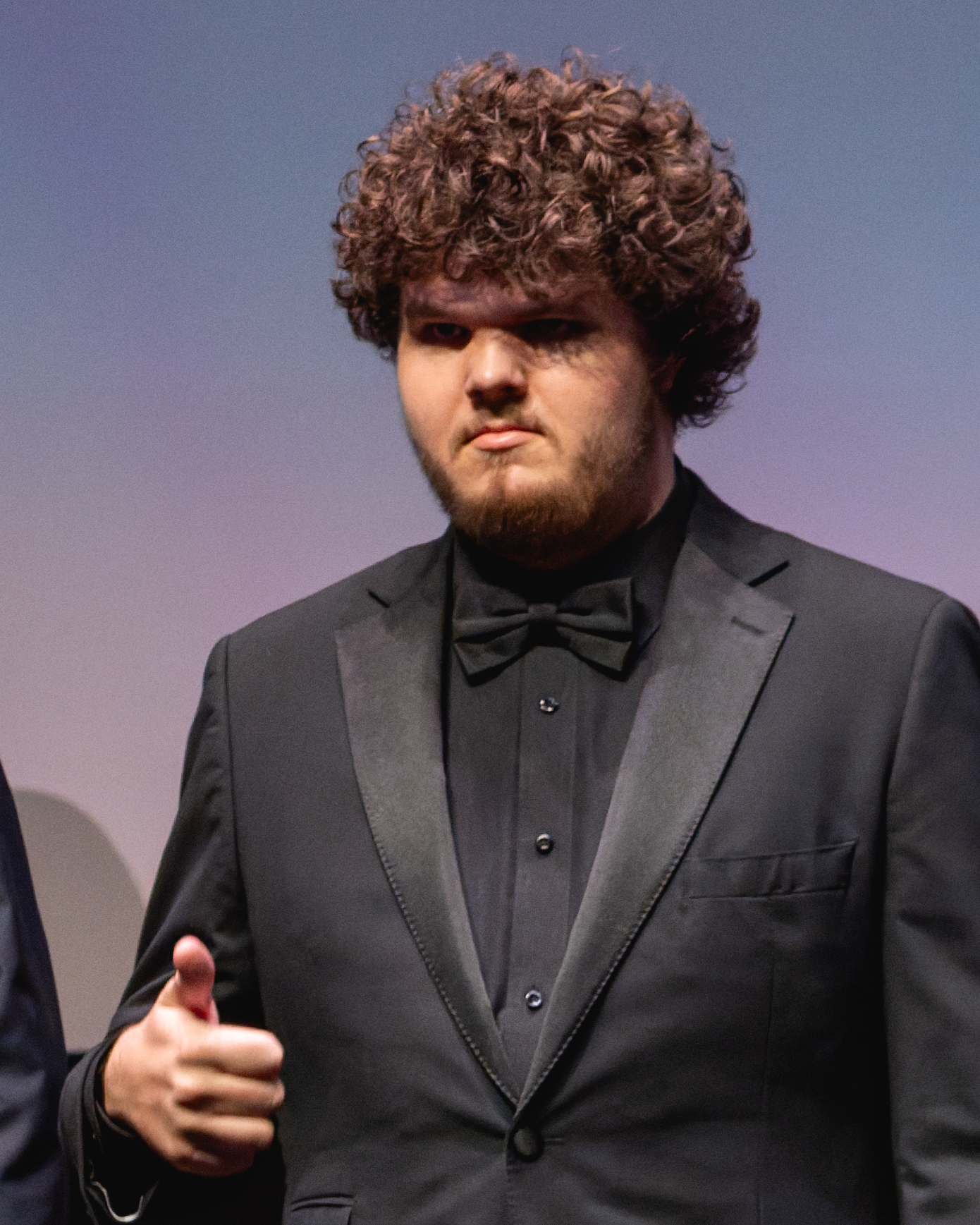
- Delbis in 2025
- Born: 2005 or 2006 (age 20)
- Occupation: Actor
- Known for: Bugonia (2025)

Aidan Delbis (born 2005 or 2006) is an American actor. He made his feature film debut as Don in Yorgos Lanthimos's 2025 film Bugonia, which premiered in competition at the 82nd Venice International Film Festival and was released in the United States on October 31, 2025.

== Career ==
Delbis was selected from an open casting call to play Don, the cousin of Jesse Plemons's character Teddy, in Bugonia. Delbis discovered the casting call via his mother's friend, who worked at a talent agency, and submitted a self-tape while in his final year of high school. Director Yorgos Lanthimos sought a nonprofessional actor for the role, also stating that he felt the character should be neurodivergent, and cast Delbis after his audition impressed both Lanthimos and producer‑star Emma Stone. Both Delbis and the character Don are on the autism spectrum.

Bugonia premiered in competition at Venice on August 28, 2025, and Focus Features released the film in the U.S. with a limited engagement beginning October 24 and a wide release on October 31. Lanthimos described Delbis' debut as central to the film, calling his character the project's "soul" and its "voice of logic".

Delbis's access and creative coach is Elaine Hall, the founder of The Miracle Project. Her goal is to help center him and make his on-set experience easier.

== Recognition ==
Following the film's premiere and U.S. release, Delbis was profiled by People for his breakout turn and unconventional path to casting. He was presented as a newcomer in main‑cast billing at Venice and was singled out in reviews for his performance as Don.

== Accolades ==
Award	Date of ceremony	Category	Result	Ref.
Astra Film Awards	January 9, 2026	Best Young Performer	Nominated	

== Personal life ==
Delbis is from La Crescenta, California, where he attended Crescenta Valley High School. Delbis is autistic.
