= Will Tracy =

American film producer and writer

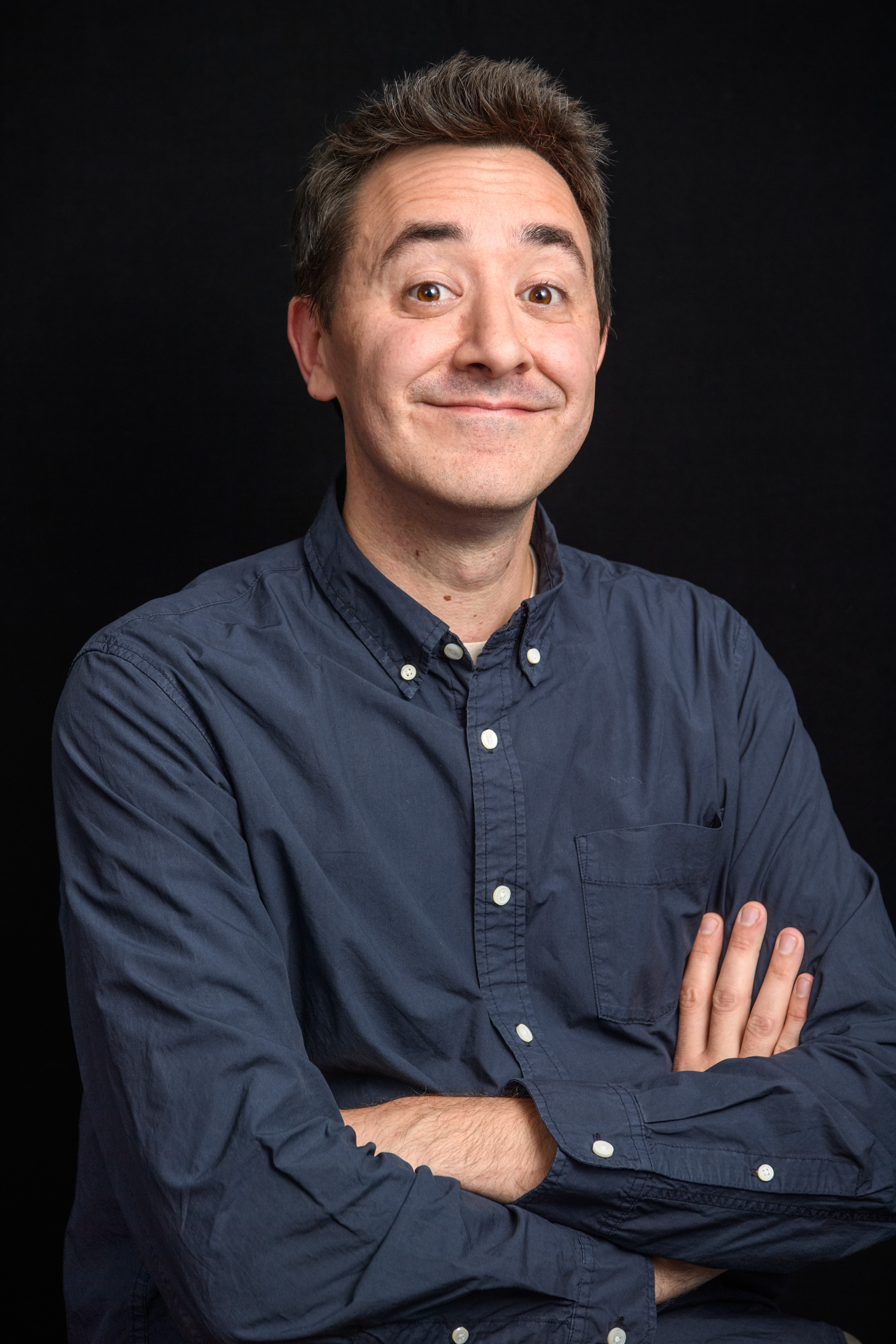
- Tracy in 2025
- Occupations: Film producer, screenwriter

Will Tracy is an American film producer and writer. He is the former editor in chief of The Onion. He attended Vassar College where he received a degree in English. Tracy was nominated for the Academy Award for Best Adapted Screenplay for his work on Yorgos Lanthimos' Bugonia (2025).

== Filmography ==
=== Television ===
Year	Title	Writer	Producer	Ref.
2014–2017	Last Week Tonight with John Oliver	Yes	No	
2019–2023	Succession	Yes	Yes	
2024	The Regime	Yes	Yes	
2025	Mountainhead	No	Yes	

=== Feature film ===
Year	Title	Writer	Producer	Ref.
2022	The Menu	Yes	Executive	
2025	Bugonia	Yes	No	
2025	Eddington	No	Executive	
