= My Best Friend (2001 film) =

2001 film by Yorgos Lanthimos and Lakis Lazopoulos

- Directed by: Yorgos Lanthimos; Lakis Lazopoulos
- Written by: Lakis Lazopoulos
- Starring: Lakis Lazopoulos; Antonis Kafetzopoulos
- Edited by: Yorgos Mavropsaridis
- Music by: Nikko Patrelakis
- Release date: 2 March 2001
- Running time: 104 minutes
- Country: Greece
- Language: Greek

My Best Friend (Greek: Ο καλύτερός μου φίλος, romanized: O kalyteros mou filos) is a 2001 Greek comedy film directed by Yorgos Lanthimos and Lakis Lazopoulos. It is Lanthimos' feature directorial debut.

== Plot ==
Two friends since childhood have spent their lives tormenting each other. When one discovers the other is sleeping with his wife their marriages and friendship collapse into a mayhem of sex and lies.

== Cast ==
- Lakis Lazopoulos – Konstantinos
- Antonis Kafetzopoulos – Alekos
- Vera Krouska – Dafni
- Smaragda Karydi – Andrea

== Reception ==
Robert Koehler of Variety described the film's results as "unbalanced at best..." writing that the film's "frenetic energy and push beyond the boundaries of realism recalls a younger Terry Gilliam, but the ribald, joyously lusty sexuality is Lazopoulos’ own, and he uses it as a comic engine for useful if predictable irony in the final reel."

== Box office ==
The film was a commercial success, selling 350,000 admissions in Greece. In Cyprus, it sold 7,914 admissions.
