= Culden Faw Estate =

Estate in southern England

Coordinates: 51.57026°N 0.89024°W

The Culden Faw Estate is a large-scale agricultural, sporting, and residential estate covering 3,500 acres (14 km^{2}) across the boundaries of Buckinghamshire and Oxfordshire, England.

== History ==
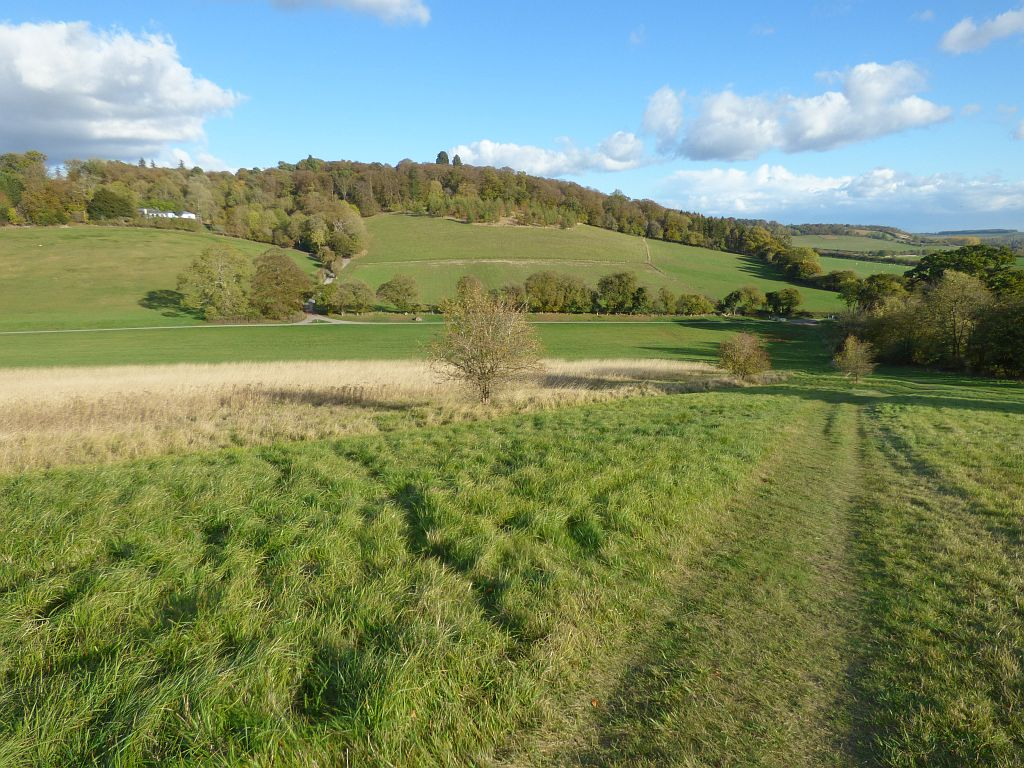
The estate's hills

It was formed through the amalgamation of several historic landholdings, including the Culham, Hambleden, and Henley Park estates.

== Ecology ==
The estate is noted for its biodiversity, particularly its ancient beech woods which are a part of the Chilterns Beechwoods Special Area of Conservation, within the Chilterns Area of Outstanding Natural Beauty (AONB), The estate also features SSSI sites including Temple Island Meadows.

== In popular culture ==
Culden Faw, and specifically the village of Hambleden, is one of the most prolific filming locations in the United Kingdom.

The estate has served as the backdrop for numerous feature films, including: Chitty Chitty Bang Bang (1968), 101 Dalmatians (1996), Sleepy Hollow (1999), Into the Woods (2014), Bugonia (2025), and The Sheep Detectives (2026). It has also appeared in television: Band of Brothers, Midsomer Murders, Poirot, and The New Avengers.
