= Michelle Greco =

American basketball player (born 1980)

Personal information
- Born: March 24, 1980 (age 46)

Career information
- High school: Crescenta Valley High School (La Crescenta, California)
- College: UCLA (1998–2003)
- WNBA draft: 2001: 4th round, 50th overall pick
- Drafted by: Charlotte Sting
- Playing career: 2001–2017
- Position: Guard / forward
- Number: 10
- Coaching career: 2012–present

Career history
- 2003: Seattle Storm
- 2003: Maccabi Raanana
- 2004: Apollon Ptolemaidas
- 2004: Seattle Storm
- 2005: Acer Priolo
- 2006–2013: Taranto Cras Basket
- 2014–2015: Edirne Belediyesi Edirnespor

Career highlights
- 2x All Pac-10 (2001, 2003)
- Stats at Basketball Reference

Michelle Greco (born March 24, 1980) is a retired basketball player. Greco started her basketball career with Crescenta Valley High School, where she scored 2,397 career points during the mid to late 1990s. While on the UCLA Bruins women's basketball team from 1998 to 2003, Greco played in the 1999 NCAA Division I women's basketball tournament and reached the Elite Eight. With 288 steals and 1,707 points, Greco was fifth in career steals and eleventh in career points for UCLA leading up to the 2020 season. In professional basketball. Greco briefly played in Israel and Greece during the early 2000s before joining the WNBA in 2004.

As part of the Seattle Storm, Greco won the 2004 WNBA Finals and was cut the following year. Upon her move to the Lega Basket Femminile in 2005, Greco started out with Acer Priolo before joining Taranto Cras Basket the next year. With Taranto until 2013, Greco and her team won three A1 Series Championships and reach the final of the 2008-09 EuroCup Women tournament. During her time with the two Italian teams, Greco had a combined total of 1,904 career points. Outside of Italy, Greco was a girls basketball coach for St Bernard High School and played basketball in Turkey during the 2010s.

== Early life and education ==
Greco was born in La Crescenta, California on March 24, 1980. During the mid to late 1990s, Greco won four tennis championships while attending Crescenta Valley High School. Greco was also a high school softball player and set a basketball record of 2,397 career points for the school. While with the high school basketball team, Greco and Crescenta Valley were defeated in the 1997 Division 1-A championship game as part of the CIF Southern Section.

For her post-secondary education, Greco studied comparative politics and history at the University of California, Los Angeles. While at UCLA, Greco starting playing on the UCLA Bruins women's basketball team in 1998. At the 1999 NCAA Division I women's basketball tournament, Greco and the Bruins reached the Elite Eight. The following season, Greco had multiple concussions while playing basketball from 1999 to 2000. In February 2001, Greco experienced another concussion and sat out two games.

After five game appearances in 2001, Greco was not allowed to play during the remainder of the season due to her previous concussions. When Greco was permitted to return in September 2002, Greco remained with the Bruins until March 2003. Throughout her 121 games, Greco had 288 steals and 468 rebounds as part of her accumulated 1,707 points. During individual seasons, Greco had the most steals for UCLA in 2000 and 2003. In UCLA records, Greco was fifth in career steals and eleventh in career points leading up to the 2020 season.

== Career ==
In the WNBA, Greco was briefly part of the Cleveland Rockers in May 2003 before being cut from the team that month. That year, Greco began her international basketball career with Maccabi Raanana in Israel. After remaining there for a month, Greco went to Greece when she joined Apollon Ptolemaidas in January 2004. She remained with Greece until she joined the Seattle Storm as part of the WNBA in April 2004. In her 13 regular season games, Greco scored 29 points while accumulating ten rebounds and eight assists. In the playoffs, Greco was part of the Storm roster that won the 2004 WNBA Finals during her four games. The following year, Greco was cut from the Storm.

With the Lega Basket Femminile in Italy, Greco started with Acer Priolo in 2005 before joining Taranto Cras Basket in 2006. With Taranto, Greco won the Super Cup in 2009 and 2010 before winning the A1 Italian Cup in 2012. During these three years, Greco and Taranto also won the A1 Series Championship. With FIBA Europe, Greco played at the EuroCup Women from 2007 to 2009 and the EuroLeague Women from 2010 to 2012. In these competitions, Taranto made it to the final of the 2008-09 EuroCup Women and the quarterfinals of the 2010-11 EuroLeague Women. After leaving Taranto in 2013, Greco had a combined total of 1,904 points between the two teams.

In between her tenure with Taranto, Greco worked at the University of Southern California as a video coordinator from 2012 to 2013. That year, Greco was hired by St Bernard High School as their girls basketball coach. With St. Bernard, Greco had nine wins and 18 losses from 2013 to 2014. Apart from coaching, Greco was also a trainer and athletic director for the Playa del Rey school.

From 2014 to 2015, Greco played basketball in Turkey for Edirne Belediyesi Edirnespor. During her 21 games, Greco scored 33 field goals and five free throws. In 2015, Greco joined UCLA as an assistant coach in sports performance. The following year, she established a bicycle touring company in Santa Monica, California with Lindsey Harding. Greco also played volleyball in her free time during her basketball career.

== Awards and honors ==
From 1997 to 1998, The Los Angeles Times named Greco player of the year for Southern California as their Cheryl Miller Award recipient. Greco was named player of the year for California as the 1998 Ms. Basketball recipient. In 2015, Greco was named part of the Winter All-Century Team for the California Interscholastic Federation.
