= Poor Things (soundtrack) =

Poor Things (Original Motion Picture Soundtrack)

Film score by Jerskin Fendrix
- Released: December 8, 2023
- Genre: Film score
- Length: 43:54
- Label: Milan
- Producer: Jerskin Fendrix

Singles from Poor Things (Original Motion Picture Soundtrack)
- 1. "Bella" Released: November 14, 2023; 2. "Lisbon" Released: November 14, 2023

Poor Things (Original Motion Picture Soundtrack) is the soundtrack to the 2023 film Poor Things directed by Yorgos Lanthimos and starring Emma Stone. The film's original music is scored by pop musician Jerskin Fendrix in his feature composition debut and features 21 tracks in the soundtrack album. It was released by Milan Records in conjunction with the film's release date, December 8, 2023. Two singles—"Bella" and "Lisbon"—released on November 14.

== Background ==
In June 2023, pianist, violinist and songwriter-musician Jerskin Fendrix was recruited as the film's composer in his feature scoring debut, as well as Lanthimos' first film to have a film score, as his previous films use source music. Lanthimos' listened to Fendrix's debut album Winterreise (2020) and "couldn't even describe it", but found that "there was something in it that just felt so right about it". The album being a mix of humour, surprise, irreverence and depth, Lanthimos felt it perfectly fit for the protagonist Bella Baxter, played by Emma Stone. Fendrix further takes inspiration from several other principal characters to score the film, which he described it as:

"If there's some kind of injustice or [the characters are] upset about something it comes out in this extremely endearing and kind of cute and embarrassing way. And [so] my toolbox, musically, is talking about feelings in a very embarrassingly kind of open way. There was also the cosmetic side of making sure that [the score] could keep up with how extraordinarily imaginative all of the production and the costume designs were. But, at the core of it, I think it really had to be very emotionally vulnerable and non-verbal."

In order to find the emotional vulnerability faced by those characters, he wanted instruments that involved air and mechanics. He used an assortment of woodwinds—pipe organs, uilleann pipes—and sampled synthesised breath and vocals giving the sense of the protagonist, Bella, who saw and felt so much being unable to fully articulate it and has been layered and developed into textures of the score over the course of Bella's adventures. To highlight Bella's emergence from her naivety and vulnerability, Fendrix used mallets and strings to craft a sense of chaos and complexity to Bella, who wanders in a strange city. The score partly acts as a window to Bella's mind.

On the creative musical process with Fendrix, Lanthimos said:

"When I ultimately started editing, I used all of that music and edited it according to the scenes—that's how it worked for the whole film. In the end, after the shoot, Jerskin didn't have to compose almost any new music for the film. We used the stuff that he had written before he saw anything. Music needs to be something different, it needs to add a layer, even if it's contradicting—to enhance it in a way that's not really expected. Jerskin is extremely talented, and he did that wonderfully."

== Track listing ==
No.	Title	Length
1.	"Bella"	1:43
2.	"'Wee'"	3:40
3.	"Bella and Max"	1:14
4.	"'Mother of God'"	1:11
5.	"Victoria"	0:53
6.	"Reanimation"	0:58
7.	"Bella and Duncan"	2:36
8.	"'I Just Hope She's Alright'"	0:53
9.	"Lisbon"	2:35
10.	"O Quarto" (Soundtrack Version) (Carminho)	1:16
11.	"Portuguese Dance I"	1:09
12.	"Portuguese Dance II"	1:55
13.	"'Goodbye Later Dove'"	1:51
14.	"Duncan and Martha"	1:21
15.	"Alexandria"	2:48
16.	"Paris"	3:03
17.	"Bella / Les Yeux Bleus / Estore's Song"	1:37
18.	"London"	2:20
19.	"Alfie"	2:30
20.	"Alfie and Victoria"	1:53
21.	"Bella, Max and God"	1:35
22.	"'Poor Things' Finale and End Credits"	4:53
Total length:		43:54

== Personnel ==
- Jerskin Fendrix - violin, keyboards, synthesizers, vocals
- Peter Gregson - cello
- Ashley Myall, Lucy Gibson - bassoons
- Eliza Marshall - flute
- Caitlin Heathcote, James Turnball - oboes
- Rob Farrer - percussion
- Alyson Frazier - piccolo
- Ian Wilson - recorder
- Grace Lemon - uilleann pipes
- Anya Doherty, Harry Colman Stewart - vocals
- Dominika Borsos, Fatima Gozlan, László Schaffer, László Demeter, Marcell Vértes, Marija Rasic, Sandor Keresztes - performers (tracks 11 and 12)

== Reception ==
Even before the release, Fendrix's music met with critical acclaim, during the film's premiere at the 80th Venice International Film Festival. Raphael Abraham of Financial Times said that Fendrix "adds discordant notes parping on the soundtrack". Jonathan Romney of Screen International wrote "the sounds here range from eerie string shrieks and toy room staccato rhythms to a lusher style that evokes a hyper-distorted variation on Michael Nyman." Calling the score "remarkable", The Hollywood Reporter-critic David Rooney described it as "a kind of punk-classical panoply of sounds, often dissonant, jarring, agitated or lugubrious, elsewhere mischievous and capering".

Jessica Kiang of British Film Institute wrote "the score – the first from experimental musician Jerskin Fendrix – tells the story all on its own. Scraping, naive single instruments initially struggle to stay in tune, before combining into a swelling, symphonic whole at the end, mapping onto Bella's rapid-order experience." Peter Bradshaw of The Guardian called it as "insinuatingly strange". Guy Lodge of Variety wrote "experimental pop artist Jerskin Fendrix's gnawing, atonal score — mirroring Bella's switching fixations by doggedly stressing one instrument at a time — stands out for its severity."

Rory Doherty of Dread Central wrote "The English musician debuts his film composition talent with tremendous results. His discordant motifs and harshly plucked strings mesh with Bella's wide, feverishly curious eyes and unbalanced footing. He even provides a sonorous chorus in the scenes demonstrating her voracious sexual appetite. When Poor Things reaches its heartfelt close, the sound of triumphant musical sentimentality is overwhelming, like it's personally beckoning you into its deeply human oddities." Lex Briscusso of Film School Rejects called it as "haunting, pulsing, and grandiose".

== Charts ==
=== Weekly charts ===
Chart (2024)	Peak position
UK Soundtrack Albums (Official Charts)	19

== Accolades ==
Award	Date of ceremony	Category	Recipient(s)	Result	Ref.
Ghent International Film Festival	21 October 2023	Georges Delerue Award for Best Original Music	Jerskin Fendrix	Won	
Golden Globe Awards	7 January 2024	Best Original Score	Jerskin Fendrix	Nominated	
Academy Awards	10 March 2024	Best Original Score	Jerskin Fendrix	Nominated	
Ivor Novello Award	23 May 2024	Best Original Film Score	Jerskin Fendrix	Won	
