= Bugonia (film) =

2025 film by Yorgos Lanthimos

- Theatrical release poster
- Directed by: Yorgos Lanthimos
- Screenplay by: Will Tracy
- Based on: Save the Green Planet! by Jang Joon-hwan
- Produced by: Ed Guiney; Andrew Lowe; Yorgos Lanthimos; Emma Stone; Ari Aster; Lars Knudsen; Miky Lee; Jerry Kyoungboum Ko
- Starring: Emma Stone; Jesse Plemons; Aidan Delbis; Stavros Halkias; Alicia Silverstone
- Cinematography: Robbie Ryan
- Edited by: Yorgos Mavropsaridis
- Music by: Jerskin Fendrix
- Production companies: Element Pictures; Square Peg; CJ ENM; Pith; Fruit Tree Enterprises
- Distributed by: Focus Features (Note: Focus Features holds worldwide rights, outside South Korea, with its parent Universal Pictures distributing internationally on its behalf.) (worldwide); CJ ENM (South Korea)
- Release dates: August 28, 2025 (Venice); October 24, 2025 (United States)
- Running time: 118 minutes
- Countries: United Kingdom; Ireland; South Korea; United States
- Language: English
- Budget: $45–55 million
- Box office: $43.8 million

Bugonia is a 2025 dark comedy film (Note: In addition to dark comedy, the film is also variably described as occupying the science fiction and thriller genres.) directed by Yorgos Lanthimos and written by Will Tracy. An English-language remake of the 2003 South Korean film Save the Green Planet! by Jang Joon-hwan, the film follows two young men who kidnap a powerful CEO, suspecting that she is secretly an alien who wants to destroy Earth. The film stars Emma Stone, Jesse Plemons, Aidan Delbis, Stavros Halkias, and Alicia Silverstone.

Bugonia is a co-production of the United Kingdom, Ireland, South Korea, and the United States. Development began in 2020, with Jang attached to direct, Will Tracy adapting the screenplay, and Ari Aster boarding as producer. Jang stepped down as director, citing health concerns, but remained an executive producer. By February 2024, Lanthimos was hired, while Stone joined as an actress and producer. Plemons joined that May, and the film was soon acquired by Focus Features for distribution at the Cannes Film Festival. Principal photography began in July in High Wycombe, England, and Atlanta, Georgia, and during which time the rest of the cast was announced. Additional filming took place in May 2025 in Milos, Greece. With an estimated budget of $45–55 million, Bugonia is Lanthimos's most expensive film.

Bugonia premiered in the main competition of the 82nd Venice International Film Festival on August 28, 2025, and was theatrically released in the United States by Focus Features on October 24. It received generally positive reviews, particularly for the performances of Stone and Plemons. Among its numerous accolades, the film received four nominations at the 98th Academy Awards, including Best Picture and Best Actress for Stone. Both Stone and Plemons received nominations for their performances at the 83rd Golden Globe Awards, the 79th British Academy Film Awards, and the 32nd Actor Awards.

== Plot ==
Conspiracy theorist Teddy Gatz and his cousin Don abduct Michelle Fuller, the CEO of pharmaceutical conglomerate Auxolith. Teddy's mother, Sandy, previously participated in a clinical trial for an Auxolith drug that rendered her comatose. Teddy believes Michelle is a member of a malignant alien species, the Andromedans, who are killing Earth's honeybees and forcing humans into subservience.

Teddy and a reluctant Don imprison Michelle in their basement, shave her head, and cover her body in antihistamine cream to prevent her from sending a distress signal to other Andromedans. Teddy explains that she has four days to negotiate a meeting with the Andromedan emperor before an upcoming lunar eclipse, which will allow the Andromedan mothership to enter Earth's atmosphere undetected.

After torturing Michelle with electricity, Teddy deems from her high pain tolerance that she is a high-ranking member of the Andromedan royal family. Teddy and Don release Michelle from the basement under supervision and invite her upstairs for dinner. The tense meal culminates in a physical fight between Teddy and Michelle. They are interrupted by the arrival of Casey, a local deputy sheriff and Teddy's childhood babysitter, who is searching for Michelle. Don knocks her unconscious and chains her to the floor of the basement. Teddy distracts Casey by showing him the apiary in the backyard.

When Michelle regains consciousness, she offers to help Don if he reports Teddy to the police. Don replies that he only wants to go to outer space with Michelle, and shoots himself in the head after she promises to take him. Casey hears the gunshot, but Teddy bludgeons him to death with a shovel and returns to the basement where he discovers Don's body. Michelle convinces a frantic Teddy that a bottle of antifreeze in her car is secretly an Andromedan antidote that will cure his mother. After dislocating Michelle's kneecap, Teddy rushes to the hospital and injects the antifreeze into Sandy's IV bag, killing her. Meanwhile, Michelle retrieves the keys from Don's body and unchains herself. Exploring the basement, she finds jars of severed human body parts, along with a binder containing photographs of several other captive people Teddy suspected of being Andromedans.

Infuriated, Teddy confronts Michelle, who admits she was hoping he would get caught and arrested. She then recounts an alternative version of his alien conspiracy: guilty over accidentally causing the mass extinction of the dinosaurs, the Andromedans created humanity in their own image. While there was peace at first in Atlantis, early humans experimented with their genome, resulting in greater aggression and a global nuclear war that destroyed all but a few, who survived in an ark, and gave rise to the current more violent human race who have been destroying themselves and their planet. The Andromedans have spent thousands of years benevolently trying to guide humans away from their innately flawed, violent nature, which Auxolith's experiments were a part of. She claims that her mothership has the information needed to save humanity and agrees to arrange a meeting between Teddy and the Andromedans at Auxolith headquarters.

They arrive at her office, where Michelle says she will try to initiate contact by entering a series of numbers into a calculator on her desk. Michelle instructs Teddy to enter her closet, which she claims is a teleporter to her ship. Teddy reveals he is wearing a suicide vest. After Teddy enters the closet, his suicide vest explodes, killing him and knocking Michelle unconscious. Michelle awakens in an ambulance, but jumps out and returns to her office, where she enters the closet and teleports to the Andromedan mothership.

Michelle, revealed to be the Andromedan emperor, consults with her fellow Andromedans and concludes that the human experiment has failed. She pops a clear, bubble-like dome over a model of Flat Earth, instantly killing all humans. Michelle tearfully gazes out at the planet, now devoid of human life, as birds fly and bees slowly return to Teddy's apiary.

== Cast ==
- Emma Stone as Michelle Fuller, the CEO of a major pharmaceutical company who is thought to be an alien. Michelle serves as the film's analogue to the character of Kang Man-shik, who in the original film is a man. The choice to swap the sex of the character was made by Aster, Tracy, and Jang prior to Lanthimos's involvement with the film, and, according to Jang, was one of the last creative decisions he was involved in prior to stepping down as director. Stone shaved her head for this role.
- Jesse Plemons as Teddy Gatz, a conspiracy theory-obsessed beekeeper who kidnaps Michelle. Teddy is an adaptation of the character of Lee Byeong-gu in the original film, and is similar in many ways, including his belief that Michelle is an alien and personal motivation to get revenge for his mother's poisoning.
- Aidan Delbis as Don, Teddy's cousin who assists him in kidnapping Michelle.
- Stavros Halkias as Casey Boyd, a deputy sheriff who searches for Michelle and was Teddy's babysitter in the past.
- Alicia Silverstone as Sandy Gatz, Teddy's mother.

== Production ==
=== Development and casting ===
Development of an English-language remake of the South Korean film Save the Green Planet! by Jang Joon-hwan began in 2020 with Will Tracy adapting the screenplay, and Jang attached to direct. Ari Aster was signed on to produce and was instrumental in the hiring of Tracy and the decision to swap the central character from a man to a woman. Tracy said he only viewed Save the Green Planet! once before beginning work on Bugonia, and avoided faithfully reproducing the original film's story as he preferred the films to stand alone.

Jang stepped down as director, citing health problems. He remained an executive producer. In February 2024, it was revealed that Yorgos Lanthimos would be directing, with Element Pictures joining the production team. Jang said he was pleased by Lanthimos's hiring and called him a "very fitting" choice. Emma Stone was also in talks to star, making it her fourth collaboration with Lanthimos. Jesse Plemons joined the cast by the time it was retitled Bugonia and taken to the Cannes Film Market in May. In October, Alicia Silverstone joined the cast. In May 2025, it was revealed that Aidan Delbis and Stavros Halkias had been cast.

The title of the film is the name of a folk ritual described in some ancient Mediterranean texts, including Virgil's Georgics. It involves sacrificing a cow, believing that bees would spontaneously generate from its carcass.

=== Filming ===
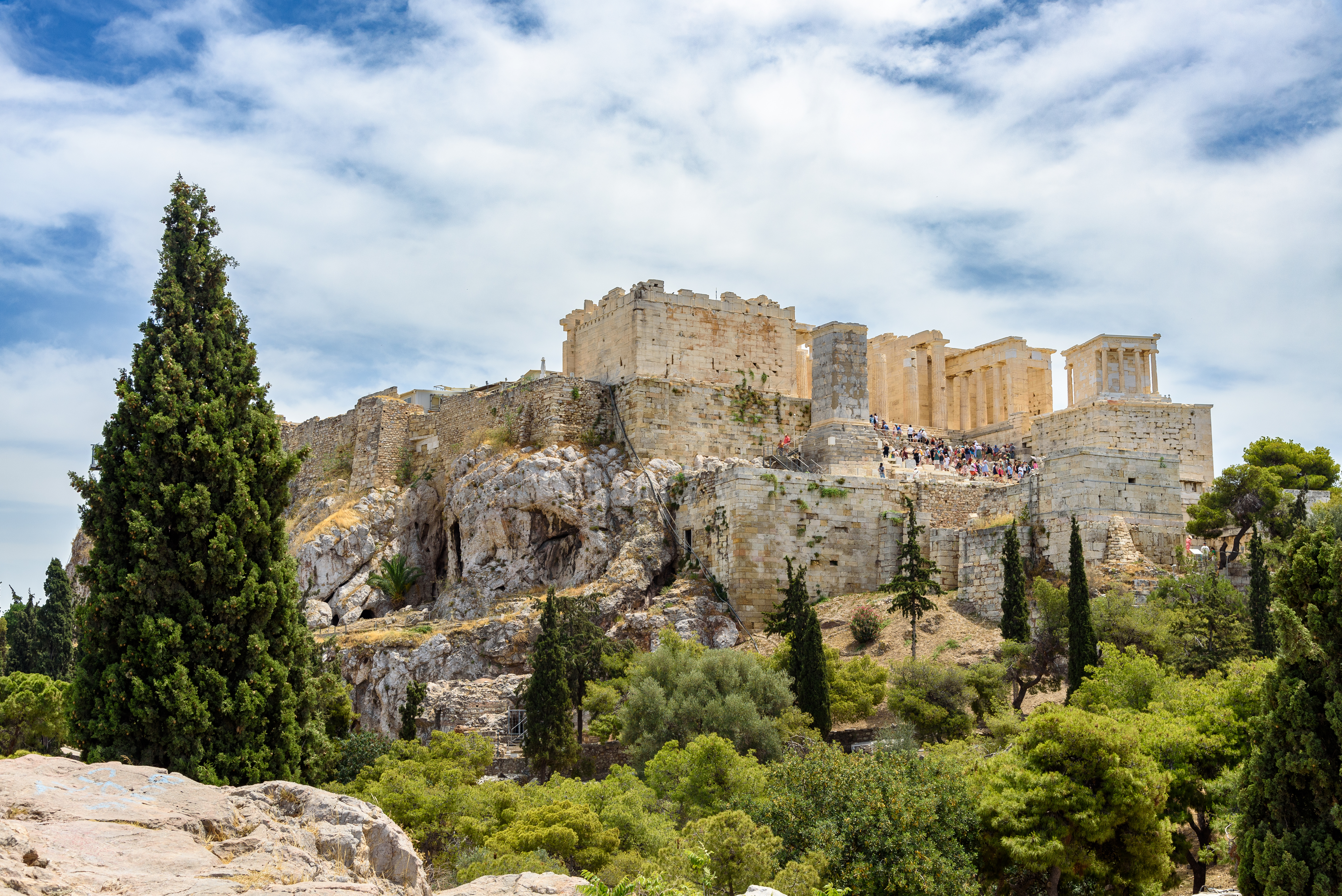
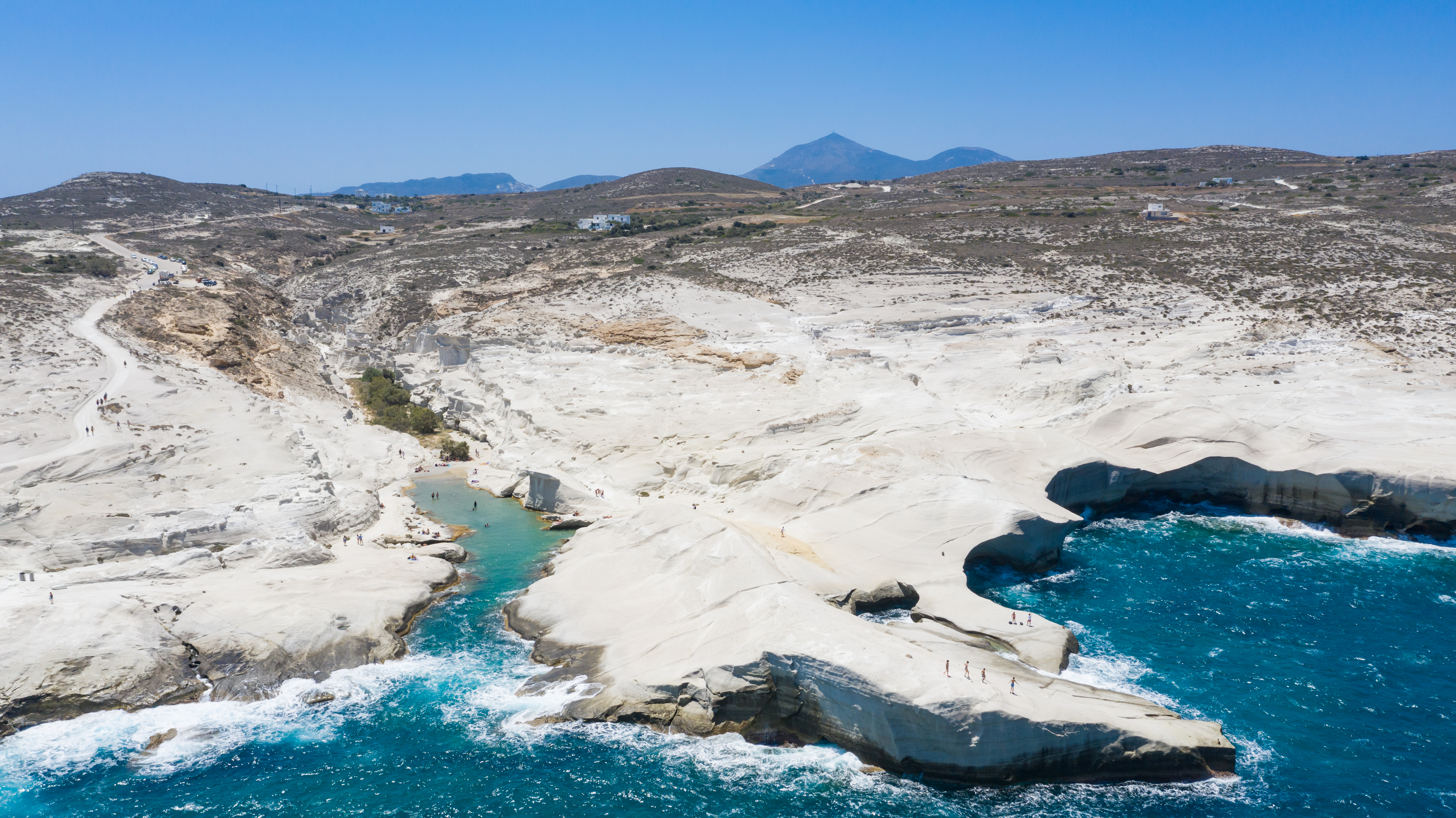
Lanthimos intended to film the ending scene of Bugonia at the Acropolis of Athens, but could not obtain permission to do so, and the scene was instead filmed at the Sarakiniko Beach.

Principal photography began on July 1, 2024, in Oxshott and High Wycombe, England. Filming also took place in Atlanta, Georgia, where it wrapped there in October. Teddy's house, including the basement, was constructed on a site within the Culden Faw Estate. For the fictional Auxolith headquarters, the Botanica Ditton Park, a co-working space in Ditton Park, was used as the filming location. Additional filming took place in Arborfield Studios. Lanthimos wanted the ending of Bugonia to be filmed in the Acropolis of Athens, but the Central Archaeological Council of Greece rejected his request. The Sarakiniko Beach on the Greek island of Milos was chosen as the alternative location, with filming taking place in May 2025. The film was budgeted at $45 million. However, a Deadline Hollywood report indicated that it cost $55 million, making it Lanthimos' most expensive film, surpassing Poor Things.

The cinematographer Robbie Ryan shot on 8-perf 35 mm film with VistaVision cameras, marking his fourth collaboration with Lanthimos. With approximately 95% of the film shot in VistaVision by Ryan's estimate, it has used the format more than any film since One-Eyed Jacks (1961). For the head shaving scene, the crew shot the scene in one take with four VistaVision cameras running simultaneously due to the camera's tendency to shut down.

== Music ==
Jerskin Fendrix composed and conducted the score, performed by the London Contemporary Orchestra. This marks his third collaboration with Lanthimos after Poor Things (2023) and Kinds of Kindness (2024). According to sound designer Johnnie Burn, Fendrix was asked by Lanthimos to write the score based on the words "bees", "basement" and "spaceship". He did not provide him with the script or any other footage until after hearing the score.

== Release ==
=== Marketing ===
First footage was screened at the Universal Pictures/Focus Features panel in CinemaCon on April 2, 2025, with the absence of Lanthimos and Stone. The teaser trailer was released online on June 26, featuring Green Day's song "Basket Case." A day prior to its Venice debut on August 27, 2025, the first poster was released, with a first official trailer, featuring a remix of Chappell Roan's song "Good Luck, Babe!" and revealing Stone's bald look for the film, releasing the next day.

A week before its limited release in the United States, an in-universe website titled "Human Resistance HQ" was released, featuring a poorly made website including a deep-dive into Stone's character Michelle Fuller, a collection of articles and files connected to the film's plot, and linked a LinkedIn page of the fictional in-universe company Auxolith. Additionally, two billboards, respectively in Los Angeles and New York City, were released, advertising Auxolith, before each being vandalized with "ANDROMEDAN FILTH" and "JOIN THE HUMAN RESISTANCE."

On October 20, four days before the limited release in the United States, an advanced free screening at the Culver Theater in Los Angeles was given to bald audiences, with a barber present to shave people's heads to enter the screening. The film's title card, posters, and credits were designed by Greek graphic designer Vasilis Marmatakis, a longtime Lanthimos collaborator. Marmatakis used a custom digitisation of Churchward Roundsquare, a geometric typeface designed by Samoan-born New Zealand typographer Joseph Churchward, which he discovered in the archives of the Museum of New Zealand Te Papa Tongarewa and digitized with permission from Churchward's family.

=== Theatrical ===
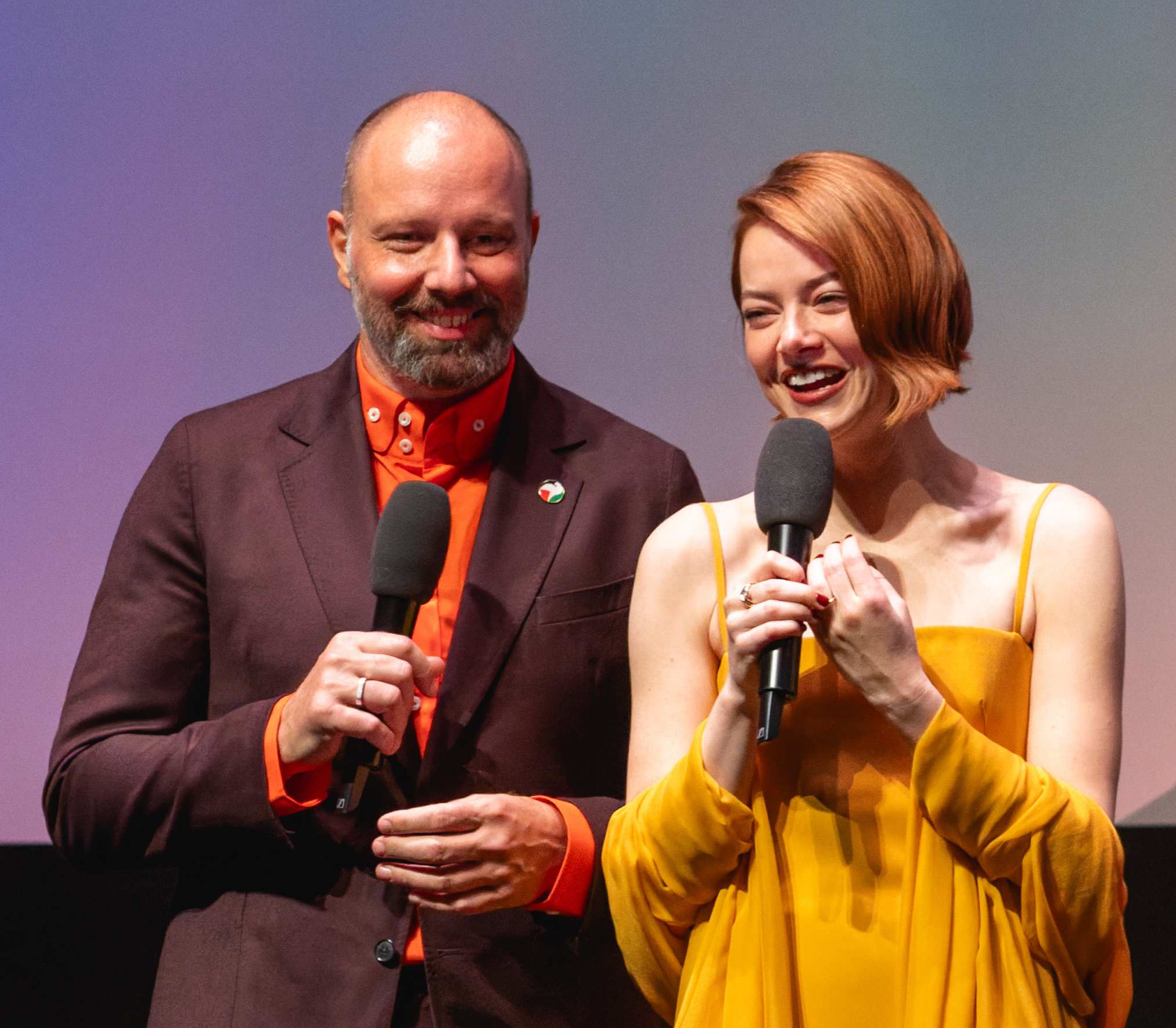
Yorgos Lanthimos (left) and Emma Stone (right), promoting Bugonia during its UK premiere at the BFI London Film Festival in October 2025.

Bugonia premiered at the Venice International Film Festival on August 28, 2025. Focus Features acquired the film's worldwide rights outside South Korea, which CJ ENM Films & Television retained, to the project at the Marché du Film in May 2024, with its parent Universal Pictures handling international distribution on its behalf. The film had a limited release in the United States on October 24, 2025, before having a wide release on October 31, 2025. It was previously scheduled to be released on November 7, 2025. It was released in Ireland by Universal Pictures on October 31, 2025, and was released in South Korea by CJ ENM on November 5, 2025. In addition to digital screenings, it was shown in 35 mm in select theaters.

=== Home media ===
Bugonia was released on video on demand (VOD) on November 25, 2025, and on DVD, Blu-ray and Ultra HD Blu-Ray on December 23, 2025.

== Reception ==
=== Box office ===
Bugonia grossed $17.7 million in the United States and Canada, and $26.1 million in other territories, for a worldwide total of $43.8 million. In the United States and Canada, the film was released alongside Regretting You and Chainsaw Man – The Movie: Reze Arc, and was projected to gross around $3–4 million in its opening weekend. It made $1.8 million on its first day of wide release at the box office and went on to debut to $4.8 million in its opening weekend.

=== Critical response ===
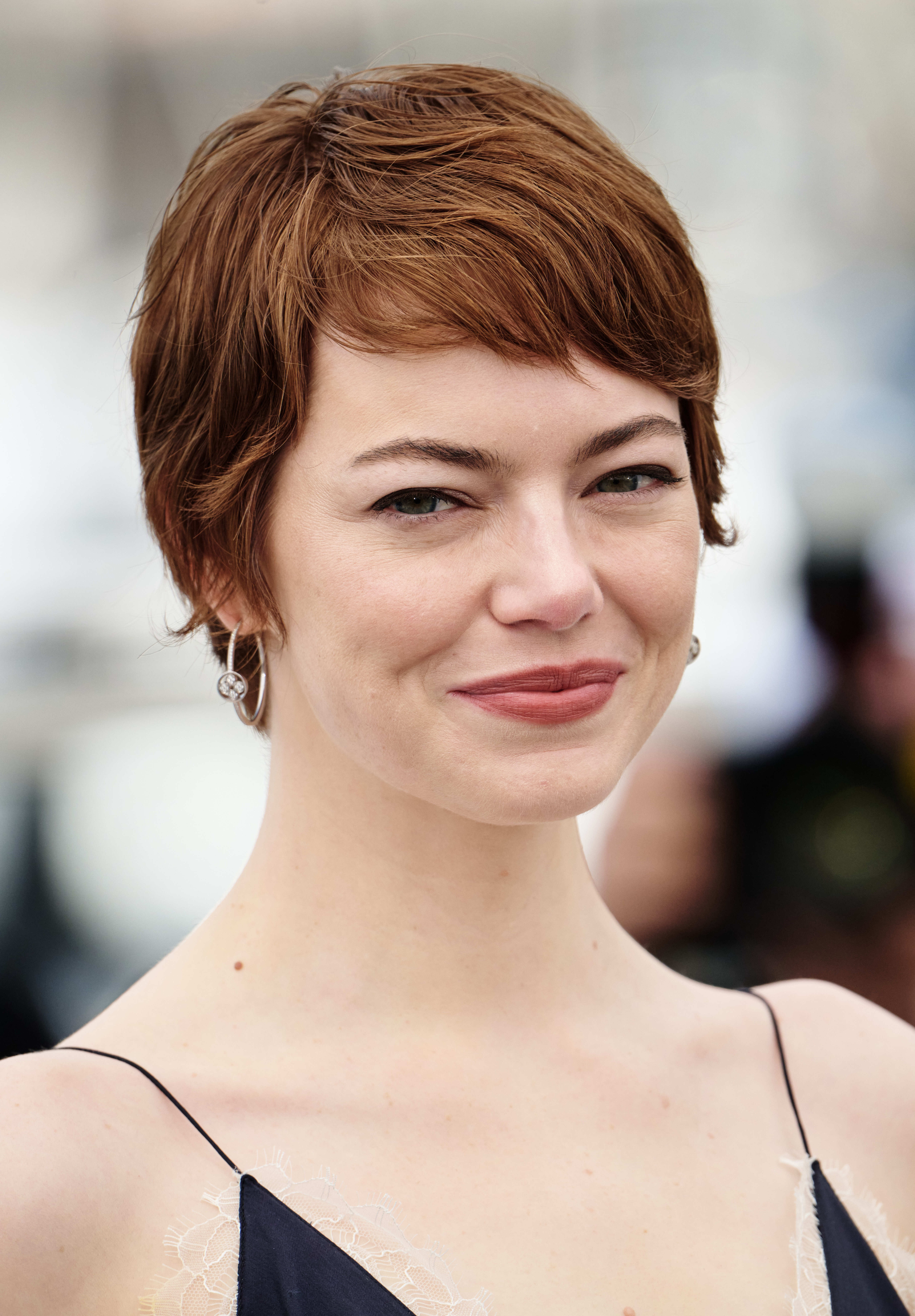
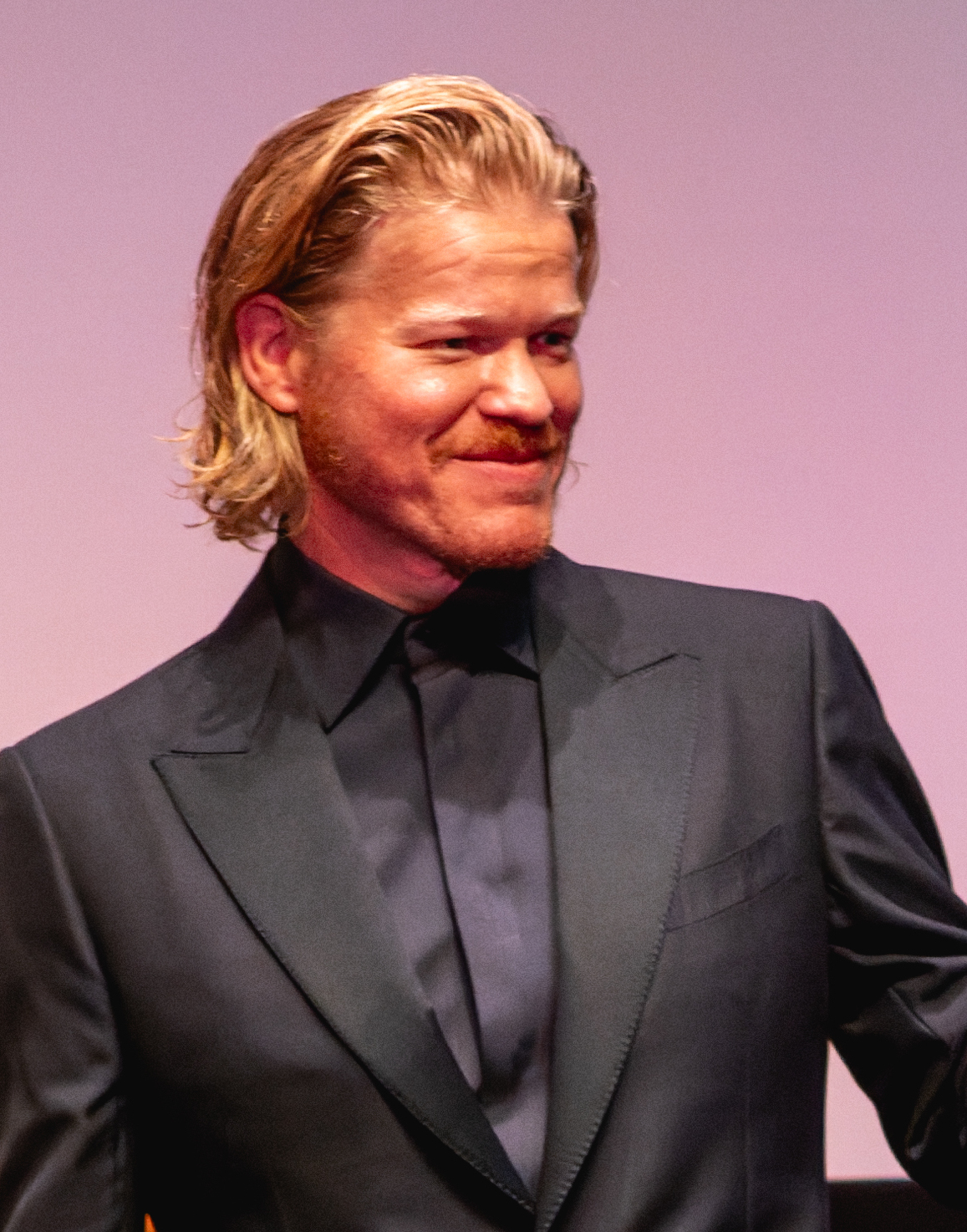
The performances of Emma Stone and Jesse Plemons garnered widespread critical acclaim, with each receiving nominations for the Actor Award, BAFTA, and Golden Globe, among others. Stone was also nominated for an Academy Award.

On the review aggregator website Rotten Tomatoes, 87% of 343 critics' reviews are positive, with an average rating of 7.3/10. The website's consensus reads: "Emma Stone and Jesse Plemons are at the top of their game in Bugonia, a bonkers entertainment that applies director Yorgos Lanthimos' whip-smart method to modern society's madness." Metacritic, which uses a weighted average, assigned the film a score of 72 out of 100, based on 61 critics, indicating "generally favorable" reviews. Audiences polled by CinemaScore gave the film an average grade of "B" on an A+ to F scale.

David Rooney of The Hollywood Reporter wrote, "Stone and Plemons are both in top form, clearly vibing with the director's idiosyncratic sensibility and upping each other's game." He also praised "the sheer richness, the stinging clarity and the eye-searing colors" of Robbie Ryan's "spectacular" VistaVision cinematography, but said Bugonia was not Lanthimos best work. Owen Gleiberman of Variety called it a "heady and gripping experience", describing the script as an "ingeniously witty and incisive exposé of the dueling mindsets it's about". He praised Stone, writing that "as an actor, [she] has often led with her empathy, and it's that very quality that renders her cutthroat performance in [this film] so ironically exquisite", while naming Plemons the film's "most extraordinary performance". Tony Mosello of Morning Blend added that the film is “a conspiracy theorist’s dream and nightmare”. Alissa Wilkinson of The New York Times also praised Stone's and Plemons' performances. She stated that the film felt like a "demented riff on Spielberg", adding, "This is not really Lanthimos's weirdest film, and it's not his funniest or his most fun either. It's mostly kind of sad."

Slate's Dana Stevens, in a less positive review, wrote, "The disdain Lanthimos is expressing here is more for humanity itself than for any one subset of it; he's less a misogynist than a misanthropist", describing Bugonia as "unremittingly grim" and "as nauseatingly gory as it is thuddingly obvious". Donald Clarke of The Irish Times found the film "mid-ranking" in Lanthimos' filmography; he praised the three central performances and Ryan's "fabulous" and "inventive" cinematography, but felt that "there is not much substance at the centre" of the film, describing its ecological themes as "stated without being much expanded or explored".

Multiple critics drew comparisons to Save the Green Planet! in their reviews. Hoai-Tran Bui of Inverse said that Bugonia, though "technically a remake", was a relatively "restrained" film that felt more like it was drawing inspiration from the original work, despite generally following the same story beats. Stevens agreed in her Slate review, but additionally commented that the conspiracy theory-driven premise of the story "hits different than it did at the turn of the millennium", in light of how social media had greatly enabled the spread of conspiracy theories in real life since Save the Green Planet!'s release. Isaiah Colbert, writing for Gizmodo, noted that despite the close similarities between the two films, Save the Green Planet! did not "wait to get weird" as he felt Bugonia did. Despite preferring the original film overall, Colbert felt that both films served as "anxiety-laden time capsules" for the respective time periods in which they were made. By contrast, Natalia Keogan compared Bugonia negatively to Save the Green Planet! in a review for The A.V. Club, saying that the remake "squanders every opportunity" to substantively update the original film's themes.

Writing in Pajiba, Kayleigh Donaldson said that Teddy was a less sympathetic protagonist than Lee Byeong-gu, his counterpart in the original film, which she believed made Bugonia a weaker story overall. Donaldson also commented on the differences in the two films' endings, noting that in the original the Earth is completely destroyed, while in the remake only the human species is killed, showing that "the Earth is worth salvaging." Donaldson concluded by saying "If one thing unites original and remake, it is this core message: maybe the planet does need saving from us, at any cost."

=== Accolades ===
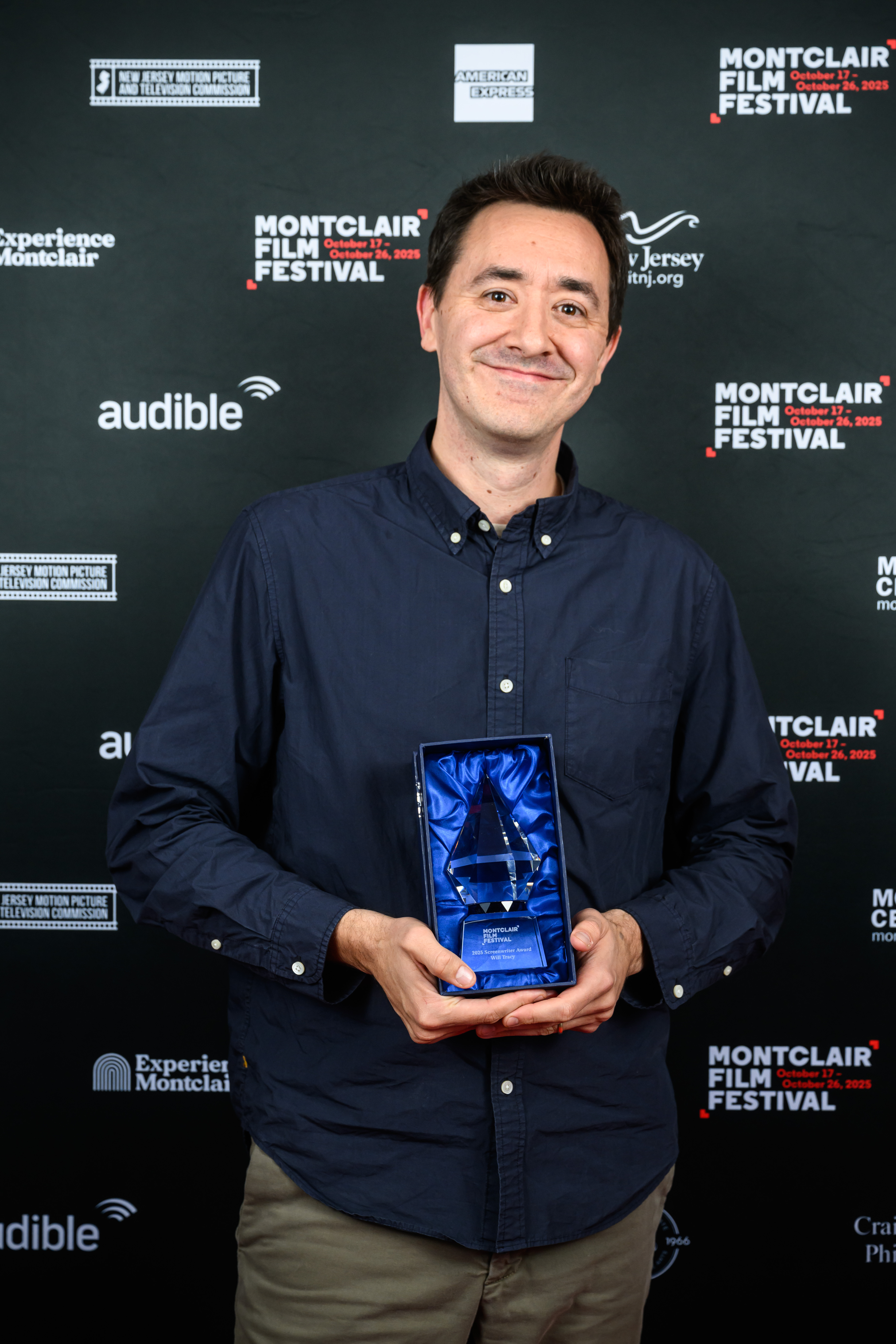
Will Tracy won the 2025 Screenwriter Award at the Montclair Film Festival for Bugonia's screenplay.

Bugonia received four nominations at the 98th Academy Awards: Best Picture, Best Actress (Stone), Best Adapted Screenplay (Tracy), and Best Original Score (Fendrix). With her nominations for Best Picture as a producer and Best Actress for her performance, Stone became the youngest woman to receive seven Academy Award nominations and the first woman to earn dual acting and producing nominations twice. Bugonia garnered five nominations at the 79th British Academy Film Awards and three nominations at the 83rd Golden Globe Awards, including Best Motion Picture – Musical or Comedy, with Stone and Plemons receiving acting nominations at both ceremonies. The film received three nominations at the 31st Critics' Choice Awards, including Best Picture, and a nomination for Best Theatrical Motion Picture at the 37th Producers Guild of America Awards. Stone and Plemons were also nominated at the 32nd Actor Awards, and Tracy was nominated for his screenplay at the 78th Writers Guild of America Awards. The American Film Institute selected Bugonia as one of the top-ten films of 2025.

Bugonia received six nominations at the 38th European Film Awards, winning Best Makeup and Hairstyling (Torsten Witte). It earned five nominations each at the 30th Satellite Awards and 9th Astra Film Awards, and four nominations at the 22nd Irish Film & Television Awards, where Stone won Best International Actress. Stone was also named Best Actress at the 2025 Dublin Film Critics' Circle Awards, and Tracy won Best Adapted Screenplay at the 2025 San Diego Film Critics Society Awards. Bugonia received three nominations at the 6th Critics' Choice Super Awards and was nominated for Best Feature at the 2025 Gotham Awards, Best Science Fiction Film at the 53rd Saturn Awards, and British or Irish Film of the Year at the 2026 London Film Critics' Circle Awards.
