= Jerskin Fendrix =

English musician and composer

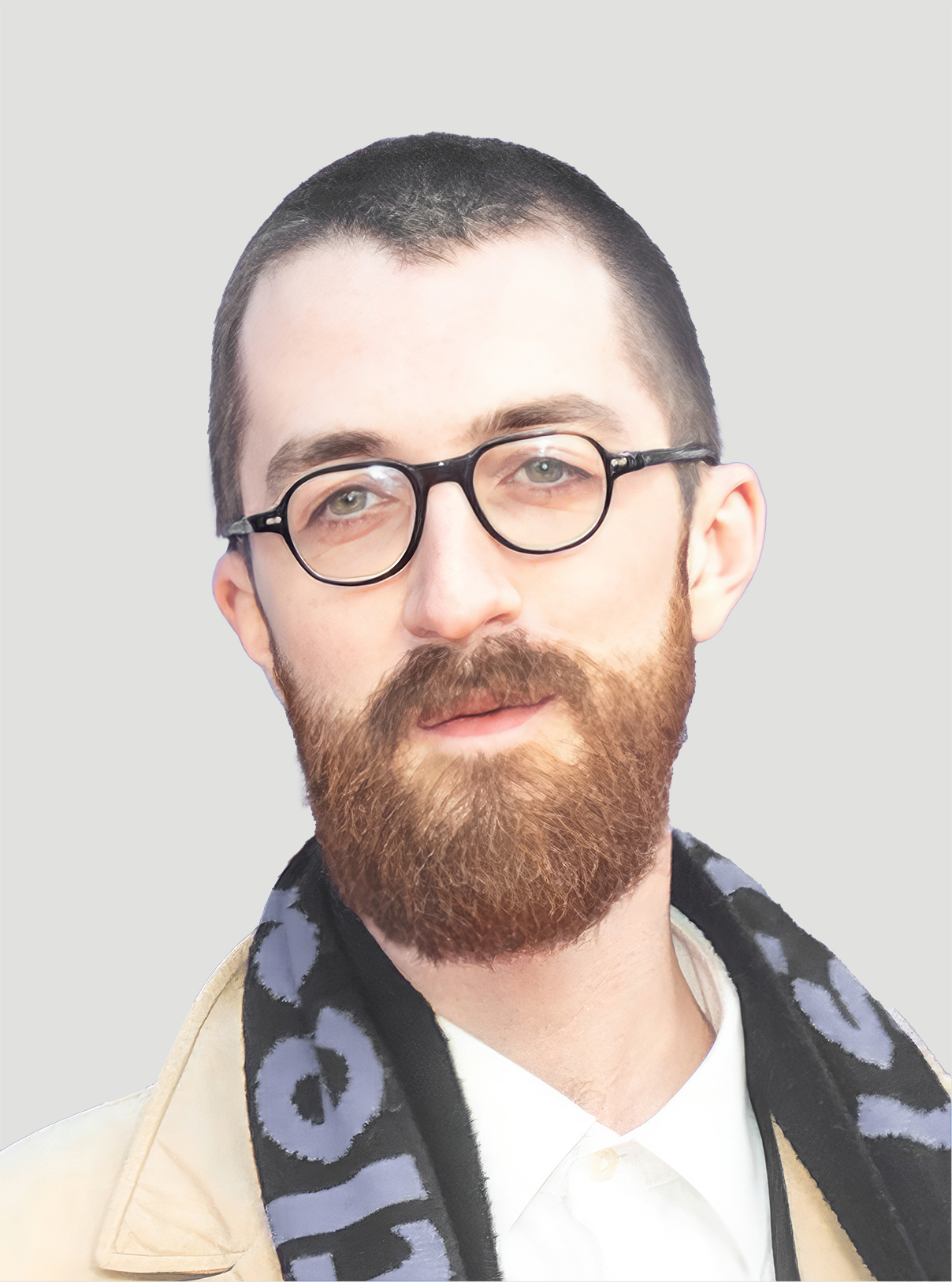
- Fendrix in 2023

Background information
- Born: Joscelin Dent-Pooley c. 1995 (age 30–31)
- Genres: Experimental pop, classical
- Years active: 2018–present
- Label: untitled (recs)

Joscelin Dent-Pooley (born c. 1995), professionally known as Jerskin Fendrix, is an English composer and musician. He is best known for composing the scores to the feature films, Poor Things (2023), Kinds of Kindness (2024) and Bugonia (2025) – all of which were directed by Yorgos Lanthimos. He received two Academy Awards nominations for Best Original Score for Poor Things and Bugonia.

In addition to his soundtrack work, Fendrix has released two solo studio albums, Winterreise (2020) and Once Upon a Time in Shropshire (2025), alongside one live album, Live at Cafe OTO (2021).

== Life and career ==
=== Early years and education ===
Joscelin Dent-Pooley was raised near Market Drayton in the West Midlands. Growing up, he listened to a wide variety of music and learned to play violin and piano. He attended Adams' Grammar School in Newport and graduated from Cambridge University with a degree in classical music.

=== Career ===
In 2018, Fendrix wrote the "appropriately abrasive" score for a performance of the play Ubu Roi by Alfred Jarry at the Victoria and Albert Museum.

In December 2018, he collaborated with Black Midi on the song "Ice Cream", which appeared on a charity Christmas compilation, created by Brixton musicians. He released his debut, the critically acclaimed experimental pop album Winterreise, in 2020.

Universal Music Publishing Group signed Fendrix in July 2024.

Director Yorgos Lanthimos commissioned Fendrix to write the score for his film Poor Things after hearing Winterreise. It was the first film score Fendrix composed. Among other awards, the score was nominated for Best Original Score at the 96th Academy Awards. Fendrix again collaborated with Lanthimos in composing his 2024 film Kinds of Kindness and his 2025 film Bugonia. Fendrix made cameo appearances in Poor Things, Kinds of Kindness and Bugonia.

On 10 October 2025, Fendrix released his second studio album, Once Upon a Time in Shropshire, marking his return to original music composition following his success in film scoring.

== Discography ==
=== Studio albums ===
Title	Details
Winterreise	Release date: 17 April 2020
Once Upon A Time... In Shropshire	Release date: 10 October 2025

=== Soundtracks ===
Title	Details
Poor Things	Release date: December 8, 2023
Kinds of Kindness	Release date: June 21, 2024
Bugonia	Release date: October 31, 2025

=== Live albums ===
Title	Details
Live at Cafe OTO	Release date: March 17, 2021

=== Music videos ===
Song	Details
"Manhattan"	Release date: February 1, 2018 Director: Bart Price
"Swamp"	Release date: July 1, 2018 Director: Bart Price
"Black Hair"	Release date: November 27, 2019 Director: Liam Noonan
"A Star is Born"	Release date: February 19, 2020 Director: Bart Price
"Oh God"	Release date: March 25, 2020 Director: Jerskin Fendrix
"Onigiri"	Release date: June 24, 2020 Director: James Ogram
"Beth's Farm"	Release date: July 29, 2025 Director: Yorgos Lanthimos
"Together Again"	Release date: September 5, 2025 Director: James Ogram

== Production discography ==
Title	Year	Artist	Album
"Here with Me"	2020	GFOTY	Ham Chunks and Wine
"This Town"	2020	Gia Ford	Non-album singles
"Sleeping in Your Garden"	2020	Gia Ford	Non-album singles
"Plain Jane"	2021	Rachel Chinouriri	Four° in Winter
"Cold Play"	2021	GFOTY	Femmedorm
"Hard King"	2021	GFOTY	Femmedorm
"The Beach"	2021	GFOTY	Femmedorm
"Another Guy"	2021	GFOTY	Femmedorm

== Style and reputation ==
The Quietus described Fendrix's style as 'electro punk' and 'ultra-modern pop'. A baritone, he has been compared to Nick Cave and Lou Reed.

== Accolades ==
Award	Year	Category	Work(s)	Result	Ref.
Academy Awards	2024	Best Original Score	Poor Things	Nominated	
Academy Awards	2026	Best Original Score	Bugonia	Nominated	
Astra Film and Creative Arts Awards	2024	Best Score	Poor Things	Nominated	
Chicago Film Critics Association	2023	Best Original Score	Poor Things	Nominated	
Ghent International Film Festival	2023	Best Original Music	Poor Things	Won	
Golden Globe Awards	2024	Best Original Score	Poor Things	Nominated	
Ivor Novello Awards	2024	Best Original Film Score	Poor Things	Nominated	
Washington D.C. Area Film Critics Association	2023	Best Original Score	Poor Things	Nominated	

== See also ==
- List of Academy Award winners and nominees from Great Britain
