= Yorgos Lanthimos =

Greek filmmaker and theatre director (born 1973)

- Γιώργος Λάνθιμος
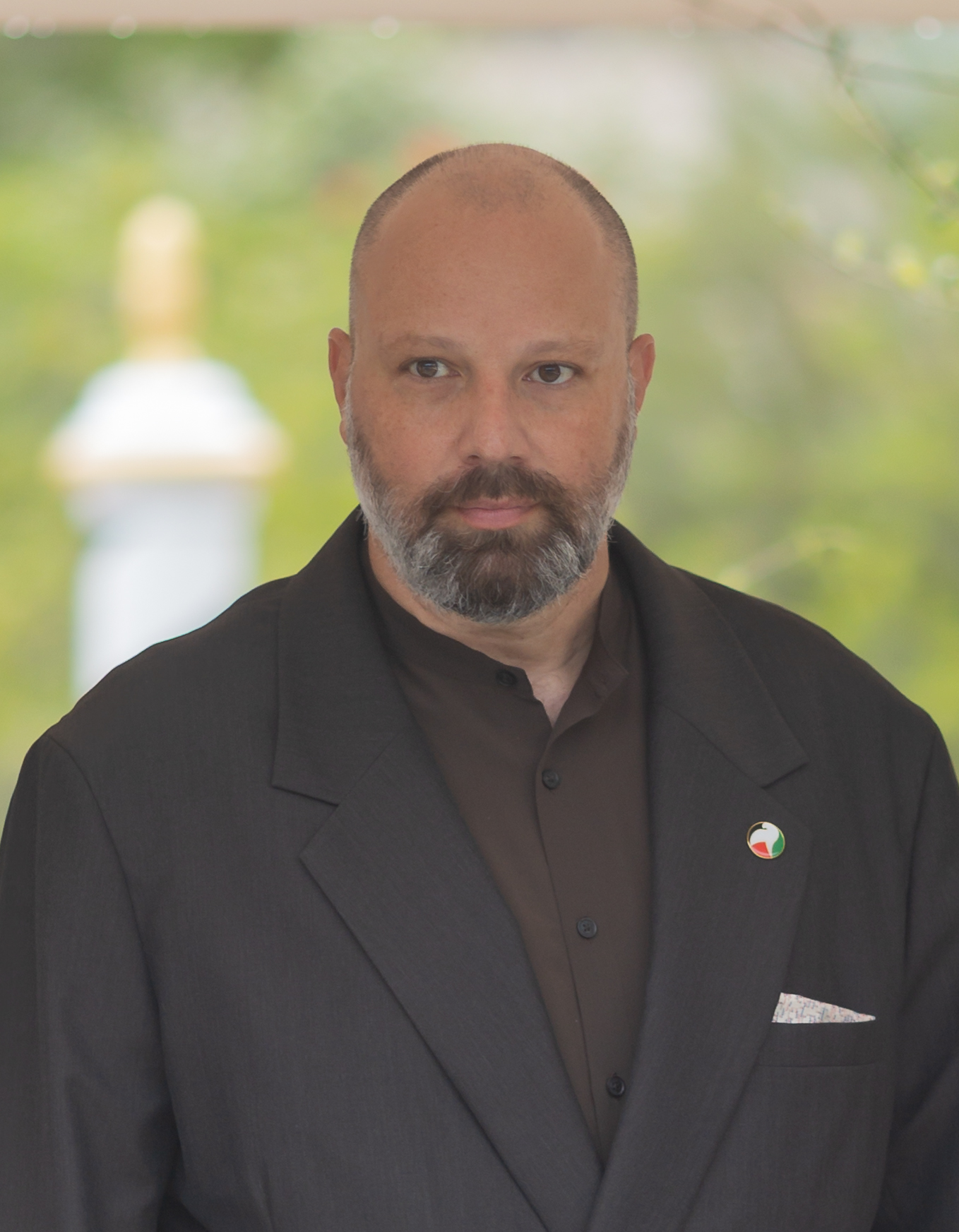
- Lanthimos in 2025
- Born: Giorgos Lanthimos; 23 September 1973 (age 53); Athens, Greece
- Occupations: Director; screenwriter; producer
- Years active: 1995–present
- Movement: Greek weird wave
- Spouse: Ariane Labed (m. 2013)
- Awards: Full list

Yorgos Lanthimos (Note: Pronunciation: /ˈlænθɪmoʊs/ Greek: Γιώργος Λάνθιμος, romanized: Giórgos Lánthimos, pronounced [ˈʝorɣos ˈlanθimos]) (born 23 September 1973) is a Greek film and theatre director. Often described as one of the preeminent filmmakers of his generation, (Note: Attributed to multiple sources:) he has received numerous accolades including a BAFTA Award and a Golden Lion, as well as nominations for six Academy Awards and a Golden Globe Award.

Lanthimos started his career in experimental theatre before making his directorial film debut with the sex comedy My Best Friend (2001). He rose to prominence directing the psychological drama film Dogtooth (2009), which won the Un Certain Regard prize at the Cannes Film Festival and was nominated for the Academy Award for Best Foreign Language Film. Lanthimos transitioned to making English-language films with the black comedy The Lobster (2015), which earned him a nomination for the Academy Award for Best Original Screenplay, and the psychological horror film The Killing of a Sacred Deer (2017).

Lanthimos is a frequent collaborator of actress Emma Stone, including the films The Favourite (2018), Poor Things (2023), Kinds of Kindness (2024) and Bugonia (2025). He received nominations for the Academy Award for Best Director and Best Picture for The Favourite and Poor Things, in addition to winning the Golden Lion for the latter.

== Early life ==
Lanthimos was born in the Pagrati neighbourhood of Athens on 23 September 1973, the son of shop owner Eirini and basketball player Antonis Lanthimos. His father played for Pagrati BC and the Greek national basketball team, later serving as a basketball instructor at the Moraitis School. Lanthimos was primarily raised by his mother.

After completing his education at the Moraitis School, he studied business administration. He also followed his father into playing basketball for Pagrati BC, before eventually quitting playing.

== Career ==
=== 1995–2008: Rise to prominence ===
During the 1990s, Lanthimos directed a series of videos for Greek dance-theater companies. Since 1995 he has directed TV commercials, short films, experimental theater plays and music videos (such as for Sakis Rouvas). He also worked as a photographer for the covers and interior photos of Rouvas's albums Kati Apo Mena (1998) and 21os Akatallilos (2000). In 2004, he was a member of the creative team that designed the opening and closing ceremonies of the 2004 Summer Olympics in Athens.

Lanthimos’s feature film career started with the 2001 mainstream Greek comedy My Best Friend, which he co-directed with Lakis Lazopoulos. Lanthimos has disavowed the film, saying he had little creative control, with Lakis Lazopoulos holding full authority.

His true artistic breakthrough came with his sophomore feature the experimental and psychological drama Kinetta, which premiered at the 2005 Toronto Film Festival. The film revolves around three nameless protagonists as they attempt to film and photograph various badly reenacted struggles between a man and a woman at a Greek hotel. The film earned mixed to negative reviews. Roger Moore of Movie Nation described it as "overtly navel-gazing, obscure to the point of suggesting obscurant. It’s a 95 minute exercise in minimalism, behavior studies, psychology and boredom." John DeFore of The Hollywood Reporter wrote a positive review, stating, "The standoffish debut holds some pleasures for patient viewers" adding, "Lanthimos enjoys provoking us visually...The camera’s gaze is as idiosyncratic as the visions the Driver tries to bring to life, but unlike him, the film seems satisfied with what it creates."

In 2008 he directed a production of Natura morta in un fosso written by Fausto Paravidino at the Amore Theatre in Greece.

=== 2009–2017: Breakthrough and acclaim ===
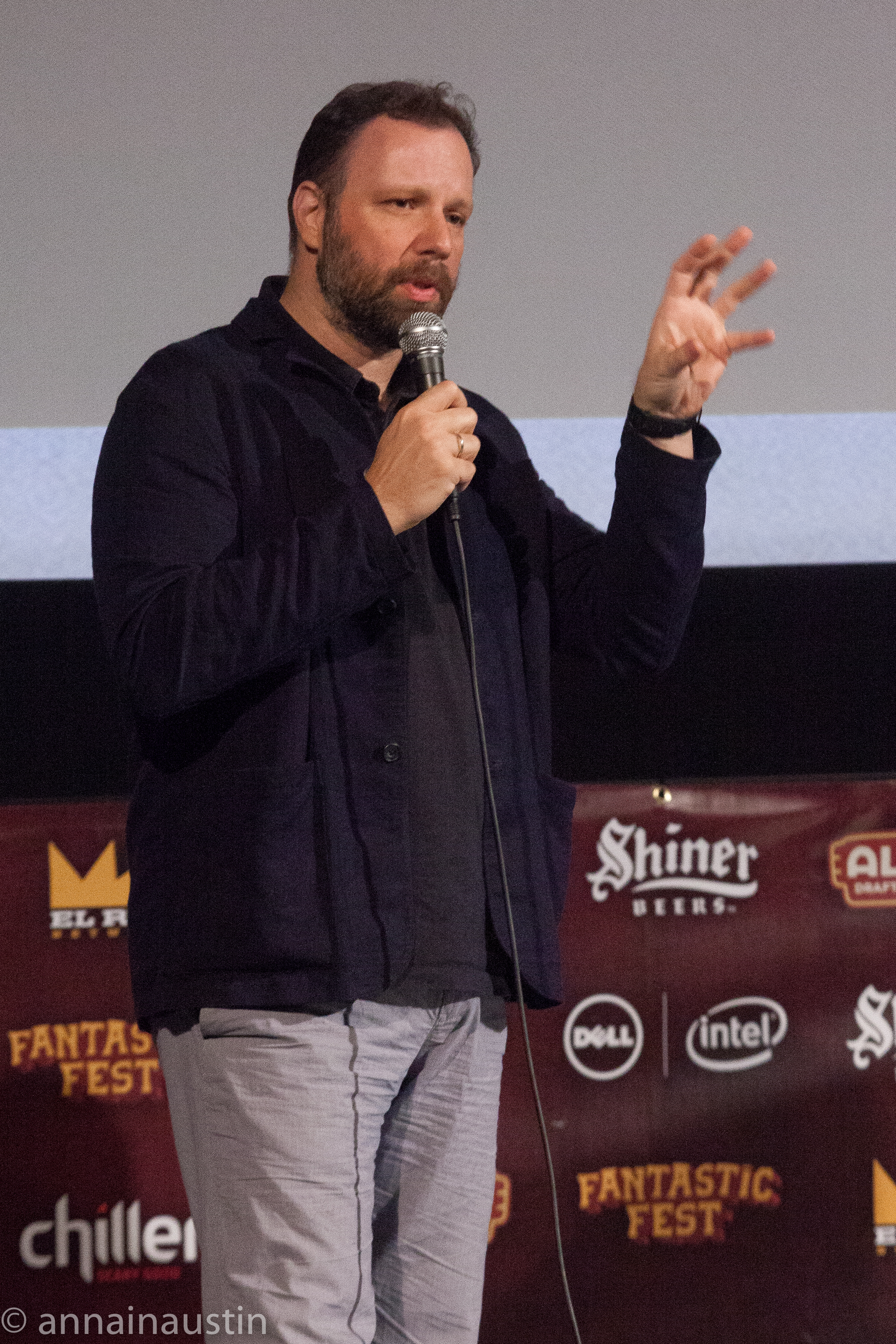
Lanthimos in September 2015

Lanthimos's third feature film, the Greek psychological drama Dogtooth, won the Un Certain Regard prize at the 2009 Cannes Film Festival and was nominated for Best Foreign Language Film at the 83rd Academy Awards. Critic Roger Ebert praised Lanthimos for "his command of visuals and performances". The Associated Press described the film as "Disturbing and at times startlingly brutal, the film will alienate those who seek genteel fare at the art house. But its edgy integrity and distinctive atmosphere should win fans in some corners, particularly among those who admire the less tongue-in-cheek work of Lars Von Trier." In 2010, he acted in and co-produced Attenberg, a Greek drama film directed by Athina Rachel Tsangari. His fourth feature film, Alps (2011), won the Osella Award for Best Screenplay at the 68th Venice International Film Festival. A. O. Scott of The New York Times described the film as "systematically unsettling our sense of what is normal and habitual in human interactions."

Lanthimos's fifth film was the absurdist black comedy The Lobster (2015) starring Colin Farrell, Rachel Weisz, and John C. Reilly. The script for this film won the ARTE International Award as Best CineMart Project at the 42nd International Film Festival Rotterdam. The film was selected to compete for the Palme d'Or at the 2015 Cannes Film Festival and won the Jury Prize. Chris Nashawatay of Entertainment Weekly praised the film, saying that "Lanthimos' films aren't for everyone. They're deadpan and almost clinically detached. At times they feel like dispatches from a distant alien planet." Lanthimos directed a video vignette for the Radiohead song "Identikit", released on their 2016 album A Moon Shaped Pool.

In 2017, Lanthimos directed the psychological horror film The Killing of a Sacred Deer starring Colin Farrell, Nicole Kidman and Barry Keoghan. It premiered at the 2017 Cannes Film Festival where it competed for the Palme d'Or. Mark Kermode of The Observer wrote: "As black comedy gives way to grand guignol, we are reminded of the tortured games that Michael Haneke once played upon his bourgeois protagonists and audiences." He also compared it to films such as Roman Polanski's Rosemary's Baby, William Friedkin's The Exorcist (1973), and Lynne Ramsay's We Need to Talk About Kevin.

=== 2018–present: Collaborations with Emma Stone ===
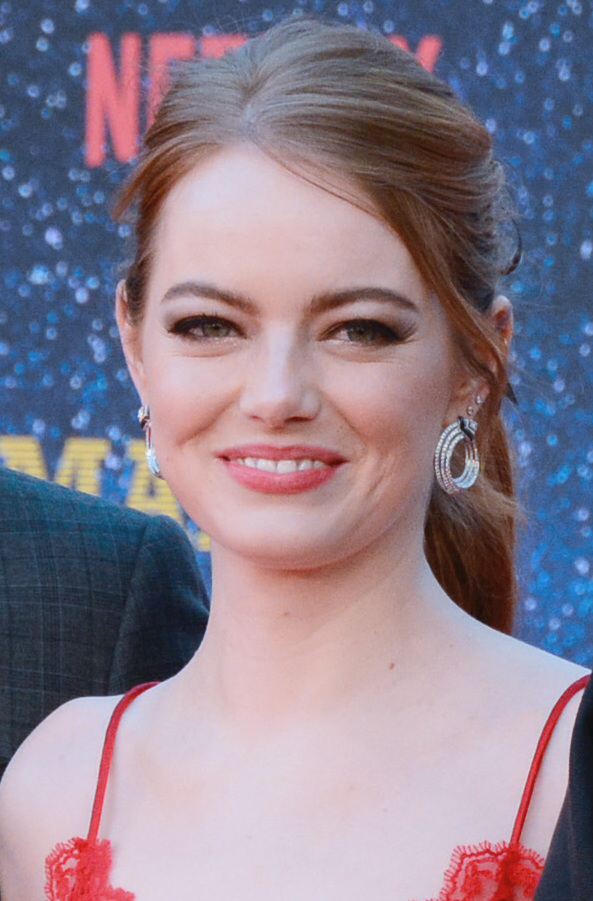
Since 2018, Lanthimos has collaborated with Emma Stone on numerous projects including Poor Things which earned her the Academy Award for Best Actress.

In 2018 he directed the period black comedy, The Favourite starring Olivia Colman, Emma Stone and Rachel Weisz. The film is a tragicomic tale of personal and political jealousy and intrigue revolving around Anne, Queen of Great Britain in 18th-century England. It made its debut at the 75th Venice International Film Festival where it won the Grand Jury Prize. The New York Times labeled the film a Critic's Pick with A.O. Scott writing, "Lanthimos, his camera gliding through gilded corridors and down stone staircases — in exquisitely patterned light and shadow, with weird lenses and startling angles — choreographs an elaborate pageant of decorum and violence, claustrophobia and release." The film went on to tie with the Alfonso Cuarón–directed drama film Roma for the most nominations at 91st Academy Awards, with ten, including Best Picture and Best Director for Lanthimos (winning the Academy Award for Best Actress for Olivia Colman).

He then directed the 16mm black and white silent short Bleat (2022) starring Emma Stone and Damien Bonnard. Bleat was co-commissioned by the Greek National Opera and Athens-based cultural foundation NEON. The story, set on the Greek Cycladic island of Tinos, revolves around a woman in black who is mourning inside a simple house. The film has been described as experimental and surrealist in style and focuses on themes of loneliness, connection, death, and desire as well as human and animal interaction. The film has only been shown twice, first being at the Stavros Niarchos Hall in Athens in 2022, and the second at Alice Tully Hall at the New York Film Festival in 2023. Lanthimos designed Bleat to be screened only in theaters with a live orchestra and chorus.

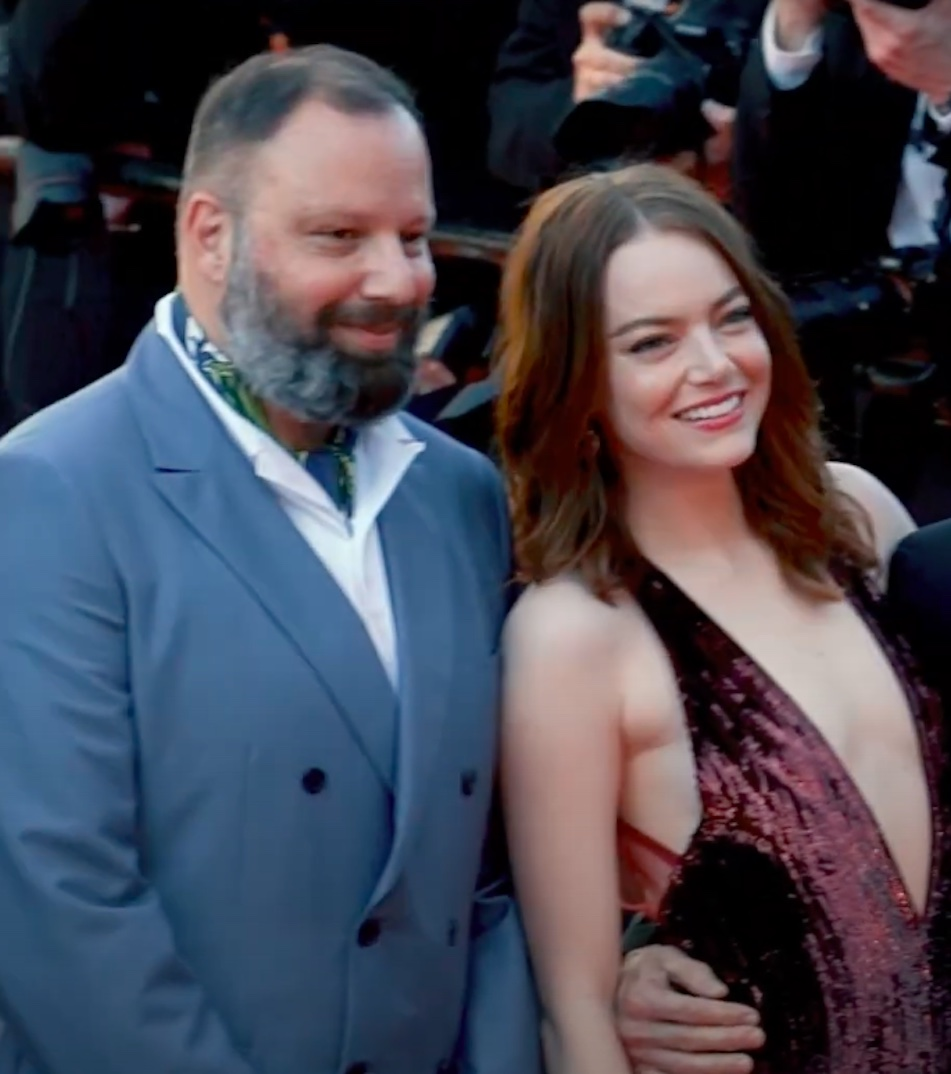
Lanthimos and Emma Stone at the 2024 Cannes Film Festival

In 2023, he directed and produced the coming of age dark comedy Poor Things, which is based on the 1992 novel of the same name. The film marked the third collaboration between Lanthimos and Stone, and also featured performances from Mark Ruffalo, Willem Dafoe, and Ramy Youssef. The film premiered at the 80th Venice International Film Festival where it won the Golden Lion. Kyle Smith of The Wall Street Journal described the film as "Sumptuous, dazzling and glorious". The film earned eleven nominations at the 96th Academy Awards, winning four (including the Academy Award for Best Actress for Emma Stone) as well as seven nominations at the 81st Golden Globe Awards, where it won Best Motion Picture – Musical or Comedy. Lanthimos published a book of behind the scenes photographs in his first photography monograph 'Dear God, the Parthenon is still broken' (Void, 2024).

For the anthology film Kinds of Kindness (2024), Lanthimos reunited with many actors he previously worked with such as Emma Stone, Willem Dafoe, Margaret Qualley, and Joe Alwyn and new collaborators Jesse Plemons, Hong Chau, and Hunter Schafer. Originally titled AND, the film is centered around three separate stories, with the actors playing a different character in each. It premiered at the 77th Cannes Film Festival on 17 May 2024, and was released on 21 June 2024 by Searchlight Pictures. In January 2024, it was announced he would direct an English-language remake of the 2003 Korean science fiction comedy Save the Green Planet! with Ari Aster as co-producer; in May, it was announced that Stone and Plemons had been cast in the project, now titled Bugonia. The film premiered at the 82nd Venice International Film Festival. Also in 2025, he directed the music video "Beth's Farm" for Jerskin Fendrix also starring Stone which was released on 29 July 2025.

Lanthimos and Stone are both signatories of the Film Workers for Palestine boycott pledge that was published in September 2025. In January 2026, Lanthimos directed Stone on an ad for Squarespace for the Super Bowl.

==== Upcoming projects ====
One of the longest-running projects Yorgos Lanthimos has been developing is an adaptation inspired by Daniel Defoe’s A Journal of the Plague Year. It is a contemporary story about a mysterious plague that strikes London. In a 2020 interview with filmmaker Kelly Reichardt, he confirmed that he was still working on it, noting that the COVID-19 pandemic led him to reconsider and revisit the script from a fresh perspective. Around the same time, it was reported that Lanthimos was in talks to direct a film adaptation of The Hawkline Monster: A Gothic Western, with Tony McNamara, the screenwriter of Poor Things, writing the script. McNamara later revealed in a 2023 interview that he had delivered the screenplay to Lanthimos. New Regency and Vertigo Entertainment joined as co-producers, following the announcement of a Pop. 1280 project in 2019. In another 2023 interview, Efthimis Filippou, Lanthimos’s longtime screenwriter and regular collaborator, revealed that the two have been working for some time on adapting a prominent crime novel from the 1960s. He did not disclose the book's title. In 2024, it was reported that Lanthimos was working on an adaptation of My Year of Rest and Relaxation with author Ottessa Moshfegh, though he has since dropped out of the project. In February 2025, it was reported that Lanthimos would write and direct an adaptation of Jean-Patrick Manchette's thriller Fatale with James Schamus producing.

== Style and themes ==
Lanthimos has been widely described as one of the most talented and innovative auteurs of his generation. (Note: Attributed to multiple sources:) He is a part of a postmodern film movement known as the Greek Weird Wave. His films Kinetta, Dogtooth, and Alps are greatly influenced by his Greek heritage. Similarly, his English-language films The Lobster and The Killing of a Sacred Deer continue to investigate similar thematic issues.

Lanthimos's films often feature uniquely framed cinematography, deadpan acting, and characters with stilted speech. They are known for mixing absurdist dark comedy with violent and sexually explicit content, as well as eccentric world-building. Lanthimos has explored sexually taboo subjects in his films, such as rape and incest. His films are often sociopolitical in nature, and often explore the nature of power and its impact on the people who are vying for, using, or being exploited or influenced by it.

== Activism ==
In 2023, Lanthimos along with Costa-Gavras, was part of a campaign aiming to save historic cinemas in Athens from demolition. He said: “We should be able to understand the value of the historical cinemas of Athens for society and culture. I plead with those in charge and those with real power to do what is necessary,”

At the 82nd Venice International Film Festival in August 2025, Lanthimos wore a Palestinian flag pin during the press conference and the premiere of his film Bugonia.

In September 2025, Lanthimos signed the Film Workers for Palestine letter pledging that he would not work with Israeli film institutions implicated in the genocide and apartheid against the Palestinian people.

In January 2026, Lanthimos was among 800 Hollywood professionals who signed a statement condemning the Iranian regime for its atrocities during the 2025–2026 Iranian protests, where civilians were protesting against repression.

== Personal life ==
While working as an actor and producer on Attenberg (2010), Lanthimos met and began dating the film's star, Ariane Labed. They married in 2013. They lived in London from 2011 until 2021, and as of 2023 they live in Athens.

== Filmography ==
=== Feature films ===
Year	Title	Director	Producer	Writer
2001	My Best Friend	Yes (Note: Co-directed with Lakis Lazopoulos)	No	No
2005	Kinetta	Yes	No	Yes
2009	Dogtooth	Yes	Yes	Yes
2011	Alps	Yes	Yes	Yes
2015	The Lobster	Yes	Yes	Yes
2017	The Killing of a Sacred Deer	Yes	Yes	Yes
2018	The Favourite	Yes	Yes	No
2023	Poor Things	Yes	Yes	No
2024	Kinds of Kindness	Yes	Yes	Yes
2025	Bugonia	Yes	Yes	No

=== Short films ===
Year	Title	Director	Writer	Producer
1995	O viasmos tis Hlois (Note: Also editor)	Yes	Yes	Yes
1995	The Rape of Chloe (Note: Also editor)	Yes	Yes	No
2001	Uranisco Disco	Yes	Yes	No
2013	Necktie	Yes	Yes	Yes
2019	Nimic	Yes	Yes	No
2022	Bleat	Yes	Yes	Yes

=== Theatre ===
Year	Title	Notes
2002	D.D.D	Theatro tou Notou (Amore-Dokimes)
2004	Bluebeard	Theatro Porta
2008	Natura morta in un fosso	Theatro tou Notou (Amore)
2011	Platonov	National Theatre of Greece

=== Music videos ===
Title	Year	Artist	Album
"I paramythenia"	1996	Katerina Kyrmizi	Kontsérto Gia Sokoláta Kai Triantáfylla
"Deka Entoles"	1998	Despina Vandi	Deka Entoles
"Theleis I Den Theleis"	1998	Sakis Rouvas	Kati Apo Mena
"Tora Mou Milaei"	1998	Stella Georgiadou	Apofasismeni
"I Kardia Mou"	1998	Sakis Rouvas	Kati Apo Mena
"Den Ehi Sidera I Kardia Sou"	1999	Sakis Rouvas	Kati Apo Mena
"Ipirhes Panda"	1999	Sakis Rouvas	Kati Apo Mena
"Andexa"	2000	Sakis Rouvas	21os Akatallilos
"Delfinaki"	2000	Sakis Rouvas	21os Akatallilos
"Andexa" (Club Mix)	2001	Sakis Rouvas	21os Akatallilos
"Irthes" (Note: (co-directed with Laboo))	2009	Sakis Rouvas	Irthes
"Identikit" (video vignette)	2016	Radiohead	A Moon Shaped Pool
"Beth's Farm"	2025	Jerskin Fendrix	Once Upon a Time... In Shropshire

=== Commercials ===
Year	Title	Company	References
2020	"Of Course a Horse"	Gucci	
2020	"Ageless"	TENA	
2025	"Ritual Identities"	Prada	
2026	"Unavailable"	Squarespace	
2026	"The Feest"	Grubhub	

== Recurring collaborators ==
Work Actor	2001	2005	2009	2011	2015	2017	2018	2023	2024	2025	—N/a
Work Actor	My Best Friend	Kinetta	Dogtooth	Alps	The Lobster	The Killing of a Sacred Deer	The Favourite	Poor Things	Kinds of Kindness	Bugonia	Total
Steve Krikris											2
Tina Papanikolaou											2
Aris Servetalis											2
Angeliki Papoulia											3
Ariane Labed											2
Colin Farrell											2
Olivia Colman											2
Anthony Dougall											2
Rachel Weisz											2
Alicia Silverstone											2
Emma Stone											4
John Locke											2
Joe Alwyn											2
Willem Dafoe											2
Jerskin Fendrix											3
Yorgos Stefanakos											2
Margaret Qualley											2
Jesse Plemons											2

== Accolades ==
Major awards and nominations received by Yorgos Lanthimos
Organizations	Year	Category	Work	Result
Academy Awards	2017	Best Original Screenplay	The Lobster	Nominated
Academy Awards	2019	Best Director	The Favourite	Nominated
Academy Awards	2019	Best Picture	The Favourite	Nominated
Academy Awards	2024	Best Director	Poor Things	Nominated
Academy Awards	2024	Best Picture	Poor Things	Nominated
Academy Awards	2026	Best Picture	Bugonia	Nominated
British Academy Film Awards	2016	Best British Film	The Lobster	Nominated
British Academy Film Awards	2019	Best British Film	The Favourite	Won
British Academy Film Awards	2019	Best Director	The Favourite	Nominated
British Academy Film Awards	2019	Best Film	The Favourite	Nominated
British Academy Film Awards	2024	Best British Film	Poor Things	Nominated
British Academy Film Awards	2024	Best Film	Poor Things	Nominated
British Academy Film Awards	2026	Best Director	Bugonia	Nominated
Golden Globe Awards	2019	Best Picture Musical/Comedy	The Favourite	Nominated
Golden Globe Awards	2024	Best Picture Musical/Comedy	Poor Things	Won
Golden Globe Awards	2024	Best Director	Poor Things	Nominated
Golden Globe Awards	2026	Best Picture Musical/Comedy	Bugonia	Nominated
Producers Guild of America Awards	2019	Best Picture	The Favourite	Nominated
Producers Guild of America Awards	2024	Best Picture	Poor Things	Nominated
Producers Guild of America Awards	2026	Best Picture	Bugonia	Nominated
Directors Guild of America Awards	2024	Best Director	Poor Things	Nominated
Critics Choice Awards	2016	Best Original Screenplay	The Lobster	Nominated
Critics Choice Awards	2019	Best Picture	The Favourite	Nominated
Critics Choice Awards	2019	Best Director	The Favourite	Nominated
Critics Choice Awards	2019	Best Comedy	The Favourite	Nominated
Critics Choice Awards	2024	Best Picture	Poor Things	Nominated
Critics Choice Awards	2024	Best Director	Poor Things	Nominated
Critics Choice Awards	2024	Best Comedy	Poor Things	Nominated
Critics Choice Awards	2026	Best Picture	Bugonia	Nominated
European Film Awards	2015	Best European Film	The Lobster	Nominated
European Film Awards	2015	Best European Director	The Lobster	Nominated
European Film Awards	2015	People's Choice Award	The Lobster	Nominated
European Film Awards	2015	Best European Screenwriter	The Lobster	Won
European Film Awards	2017	Best European Director	The Killing of a Sacred Deer	Nominated
European Film Awards	2017	Best European Screenwriter	The Killing of a Sacred Deer	Nominated
European Film Awards	2019	Best European Film	The Favourite	Won
European Film Awards	2019	Best European Director	The Favourite	Won
European Film Awards	2019	People's Choice Award	The Favourite	Nominated
European Film Awards	2019	Best European Comedy	The Favourite	Won
European Film Awards	2026	Best European Director	Bugonia	Nominated
Venice Film Festival	2011	Golden Lion	Alps	Nominated
Venice Film Festival	2011	Best Screenplay	Alps	Won
Venice Film Festival	2018	Golden Lion	The Favourite	Nominated
Venice Film Festival	2018	Grand Special Jury Prize	The Favourite	Won
Venice Film Festival	2018	Queer Lion	The Favourite	Nominated
Venice Film Festival	2023	Golden Lion	Poor Things	Won
Venice Film Festival	2023	UNIMED Award	Poor Things	Won
Venice Film Festival	2025	Golden Lion	Bugonia	Nominated
Venice Film Festival	2025	Green Drop Award	Bugonia	Won
Cannes Film Festival	2009	Un Certain Regard Award	Dogtooth	Won
Cannes Film Festival	2009	Award of the Youth	Dogtooth	Won
Cannes Film Festival	2015	Palme d'Or	The Lobster	Nominated
Cannes Film Festival	2015	Jury Prize	The Lobster	Won
Cannes Film Festival	2015	Queer Palm	The Lobster	Nominated
Cannes Film Festival	2017	Palme d'Or	The Killing of a Sacred Deer	Nominated
Cannes Film Festival	2017	Best Screenplay	The Killing of a Sacred Deer	Won
Cannes Film Festival	2024	Palme d'Or	Kinds of Kindness	Nominated

Awards and nominations received by Lanthimos Directed films
Year	Title	Academy Awards		BAFTA Awards		Golden Globe Awards		Critics Choice Awards		Producers, Directors and Writers Guild Awards		Actor Awards		European Film Awards		Total Award Nominations and Wins	
Year	Title	Nominations	Wins	Nominations	Wins	Nominations	Wins	Nominations	Wins	Nominations	Wins	Nominations	Wins	Nominations	Wins	Nominations	Wins
2005	Kinetta															1	
2009	Dogtooth	1														42	21
2011	Alps															12	5
2015	The Lobster	1		1		1		1						6	2	117	33
2017	The Killing of a Sacred Deer													3		60	7
2018	The Favourite	10	1	12	7	5	1	14	2	1		3		9	8	539	187
2019	Nimic															8	2
2023	Poor Things	11	4	11	5	7	2	13	1	2		2				546	120
2024	Kinds of Kindness					1										12	3
2025	Bugonia	4		5		3		3		2		2		6	1	125	9
Total		27	5	29	12	17	3	31	3	5		7		24	11	1462	387

According to IMDb*

Directed Academy Award performances
Under Lanthimos' direction, these actors have received Academy Award wins and nominations for their performances in their respective roles.

Year	Performer	Film	Result
Academy Award for Best Actress
2018	Olivia Colman	The Favourite	Won
2023	Emma Stone	Poor Things	Won
2025	Emma Stone	Bugonia	Nominated
Academy Award for Best Supporting Actor
2023	Mark Ruffalo	Poor Things	Nominated
Academy Award for Best Supporting Actress
2018	Emma Stone	The Favourite	Nominated
2018	Rachel Weisz	The Favourite	Nominated

== See also ==
- List of Greek Academy Award winners and nominees
