= Kinds of Kindness =

2024 film by Yorgos Lanthimos

- Theatrical release poster
- Directed by: Yorgos Lanthimos
- Written by: Yorgos Lanthimos; Efthimis Filippou
- Produced by: Ed Guiney; Andrew Lowe; Yorgos Lanthimos; Kasia Malipan
- Starring: Emma Stone; Jesse Plemons; Willem Dafoe; Margaret Qualley; Hong Chau; Joe Alwyn; Mamoudou Athie; Hunter Schafer
- Cinematography: Robbie Ryan
- Edited by: Yorgos Mavropsaridis
- Music by: Jerskin Fendrix
- Production companies: Element Pictures; Film4
- Distributed by: Searchlight Pictures
- Release dates: May 17, 2024 (Cannes); June 21, 2024 (United States); June 28, 2024 (Ireland and United Kingdom)
- Running time: 164 minutes
- Countries: Ireland; United Kingdom; United States
- Language: English
- Budget: $15 million
- Box office: $16.4 million

Kinds of Kindness is a 2024 absurdist black comedy-drama anthology film directed by Yorgos Lanthimos from a screenplay he co-wrote with Efthimis Filippou. It stars Emma Stone, Jesse Plemons, Willem Dafoe, Margaret Qualley, Hong Chau, Joe Alwyn, and Mamoudou Athie, in a triple role each, and Hunter Schafer in a supporting role.

Kinds of Kindness had its world premiere at the 77th Cannes Film Festival on May 17, 2024, where Plemons won the Best Actor award. It was released theatrically in the United States by Searchlight Pictures on June 21, 2024, and in Ireland and the United Kingdom on June 28, 2024. It received generally positive reviews from critics and grossed $16 million worldwide.

== Plot ==
Structured as a "triptych fable", Kinds of Kindness consists of three distinct but loosely connected stories:

=== "The Death of R.M.F." ===
Robert Fletcher follows every order from his domineering boss and lover, Raymond. Raymond controls every aspect of Robert's life, including setting him up with his wife Sarah, buying their house and car, and dictating when they can have sexual intercourse. One day, Raymond orders Robert to crash his car to kill "R.M.F.", a man known only by his initials. They survive with minor injuries. When Raymond orders him to try again, Robert confesses his fear and unwillingness to try again, but Raymond insists. Robert refuses again, which angers Raymond and causes him to fire Robert, stating Robert is "free now". Robert's life then falls apart. A prized smashed John McEnroe tennis racquet, given by Raymond as a gift, is taken from his house. In his despondence, Robert confesses to Sarah that Raymond paid doctors to supply abortifacients with the intention of unknowingly posing as miscarriages and ovarian issues; Sarah abandons him, quitting her job and disappearing. Desperate, Robert grovels to Raymond for another chance but is aggressively rebuffed.

While trying to regain Raymond's respect, Robert meets Rita, a woman whose life Robert quickly discovers is also being controlled by Raymond. After Rita was also tasked with crashing into and killing R.M.F., she ends up in the hospital, with R.M.F. in critical condition. In a last-ditch effort, Robert kidnaps R.M.F., dumping him in the hospital valet drop-off and repeatedly running him over with his car, killing him. Robert then arrives at Raymond's mansion. Robert embraces Raymond and Vivian, Raymond's live-in lover, on the couch. Raymond states that he knew that Robert would not disappoint him.

=== "R.M.F. Is Flying" ===
Police officer Daniel is mourning the disappearance of his wife Liz, a marine biologist who went missing at sea, when he receives news that she has been rescued in a helicopter piloted by R.M.F. Liz miraculously returns unharmed to Daniel, but many things about her are strange; her behavior and interests seem to be the opposite of how she was before, their pet cat acts aggressive towards her, and her feet no longer fit in her shoes, leading Daniel to become suspicious of her. Amid his paranoia about Liz, she tells Daniel she is pregnant. He orders her to leave and threatens arrest if she refuses. Daniel's paranoia escalates during a traffic stop, where he acts erratically, shoots a passenger in the hand, then licks the wound. As a result, he is suspended from the police force and prescribed antipsychotics.

Liz recounts to her father a dream she experienced the previous night, in which dogs were the dominant species and kept humans like Liz as pets, being fed chocolate, a food she previously hated but ate due to there being large quantities of such. She concludes that it is better to rely on something consistently available rather than something that depletes each day. Homebound and still unconvinced of Liz's identity, Daniel starts starving himself and then orders Liz to mutilate herself in various ways. First, Daniel asks for one of Liz's fingers or thumb to eat, so she severs her thumb and serves it to Daniel to eat. Daniel then tells his doctor Liz mutilated herself of her own volition and claims she began punching herself in the stomach and face. At a gynecologist's office, Liz is found to have miscarried and claims that Daniel in fact hit her after she talked back, blaming it on the antipsychotics. Later, Daniel demands more food, suggesting her liver. Liz complies, cuts out her liver, and dies. Another Liz arrives at Daniel's door, and they happily embrace. Over the credits, footage of dogs living like humans is shown.

=== "R.M.F. Eats a Sandwich" ===
Emily and Andrew are members of a sex cult led by the enigmatic Omi and Aka. The cult's ritual for cleansing involves sweating out "toxins" in a high-temperature sauna if accused of infidelity with anyone other than Omi or Aka, with Aka licking the sweat from their navel to determine if they are cleansed. Emily and Andrew are looking for a specific woman with the ability to reanimate the dead. They examine a candidate named Anna, whom they find to be unsuccessful. Emily secretly makes regular visits to her estranged husband, Joseph, and their daughter.

At the headquarters, Omi gives Emily and Andrew information on another possible candidate, but they discover that she is already dead. Emily believes that the woman they are looking for appeared to her in a dream. While Emily and Andrew are eating at a restaurant, a woman named Rebecca, who resembles the woman Emily dreamed about, approaches them and says she knows who they are. She suggests that her twin sister, Ruth, would be a perfect candidate. Andrew brushes this off, saying that one of the requirements — that the candidate's twin must be deceased — was not met.

During a visit to her old home, Emily runs into Joseph and their daughter as she is leaving, and Joseph invites Emily to visit them again. She does, only for Joseph to drug her drinks and rape her while she is unconscious. The morning after, Omi, Aka, and Andrew arrive at Emily's old home and take her to be "tested". She is expelled from the cult after being found to be "contaminated". As part of a plan to return to the cult, she decides to see Ruth. Before leaving, she visits Rebecca, who called earlier to say that she would be able to meet one of the requirements. Rebecca kills herself by diving into an empty pool during Emily's visit, fulfilling the prophecy. After visiting Ruth's veterinarian practice and witnessing the spontaneous healing of a dog she examined, Emily knocks her out and brings her to the morgue, where she orders Ruth to bring R.M.F.'s body back to life. Ruth is able to do so, and Emily dances outside her car. Speeding to get to the cult's headquarters, Emily becomes distracted and crashes the car, killing Ruth.

In a mid-credits scene, R.M.F. eats a sandwich and spills ketchup on his shirt. A waiter gives him a napkin to clean himself up.

== Cast ==
Actor	Role		
Actor	"The Death of R.M.F."	"R.M.F. Is Flying"	"R.M.F. Eats a Sandwich"
Emma Stone	Rita, Raymond's employee whose life is scheduled similarly to Robert's	Liz, Daniel's wife who has been missing at sea for some time	Emily, a cultist who searches for a woman with the power to revive the dead
Jesse Plemons	Robert, a man whose boss schedules every aspect of his life	Daniel, a police officer who suspects his wife, after returning from being missing, is an imposter	Andrew, a cultist paired with Emily
Willem Dafoe	Raymond, Robert's boss who obsessively controls the lives of everyone around him	George, Liz's father	Omi, a sex cult leader
Margaret Qualley	Vivian, Raymond's wife	Martha, Neil's wife	Ruth and Rebecca, identical twins, respectively a veterinarian and someone who believes her sister is the woman the cult is looking for
Hong Chau	Sarah, Robert's wife	Sharon, the wife of Liz's colleague	Aka, Omi's wife
Joe Alwyn	A collectibles appraiser	Jerry, an intoxicated car passenger	Joseph, Emily's estranged husband
Mamoudou Athie	Will, Sarah's swim coach	Neil, Daniel's best friend and partner	A morgue nurse
Hunter Schafer	—N/a	—N/a	Anna, a woman that Emily and Andrew test to see if she can revive the dead
Yorgos Stefanakos	R.M.F., Raymond's employee	R.M.F., a helicopter pilot	R.M.F., a dead man
Jerskin Fendrix	A bar piano player	—N/a	—N/a
Merah Benoit	—N/a	—N/a	Emily's daughter
Krystal Alayne Chambers	—N/a	—N/a	Susan, a cult member who is tested in a strange ritual

== Production ==
The film's original title was R.M.F. The title was later changed to And, and then was changed again to Kinds of Kindness in December 2023. The initials R.M.F. are not in reference to anything, according to Yorgos Lanthimos, who co-wrote the script with Efthimis Filippou. The film marks the fifth collaboration between Lanthimos and Filippou, following Dogtooth (2009), Alps (2011), The Lobster (2015), and The Killing of a Sacred Deer (2017). In September 2022, Searchlight Pictures agreed to distribute the film, which Lanthimos would direct under development with Element Pictures and Film4. Cast members were revealed soon after, including Emma Stone, Jesse Plemons, Willem Dafoe, Margaret Qualley, Hong Chau, Joe Alwyn, and Mamoudou Athie. Hunter Schafer had a cameo in the film.

Filming was scheduled to take place in New Orleans, Louisiana, from October 24 to December 16, 2022. The three stories in the triptych were filmed back to back and each story took three weeks to be completed. Jerskin Fendrix composed the film's score, marking his second collaboration with Lanthimos after Poor Things (2023).

== Release ==
Kinds of Kindness had its world premiere at the 77th Cannes Film Festival in-competition on May 17, 2024. It was also featured in the Official Competition at the Sydney Film Festival.

It had a limited theatrical release in the United States by Searchlight Pictures on June 21, 2024, before expanding nationwide and to Ireland and the United Kingdom on June 28.

=== Home media ===
Kinds of Kindness was released on VOD on August 27, 2024, and on Blu-ray and DVD on October 8, 2024.

== Reception ==
=== Box office ===
Kinds of Kindness grossed $5 million in the United States and Canada, and $11.4 million in other territories, for a worldwide total of $16.4 million.

In the United States and Canada, the film made $377,289 in its opening weekend from five theaters in New York and Los Angeles; its average of $75,457 per screen was the best of 2024. Expanding to 490 theaters the following weekend, the film made $2 million, finishing in 10th.

=== Critical response ===
On the review aggregator website Rotten Tomatoes, 71% of 289 critics' reviews are positive, with an average rating of 6.5/10. The website's consensus reads: "A cold-hearted triptych with caustic wit, Kinds of Kindness is Yorgos Lanthimos at his most misanthropic – and bitingly funny." Metacritic, which uses a weighted average, assigned the film a score of 64 out of 100, based on 58 critics, indicating "generally favorable" reviews.

Brian Tallerico from RogerEbert.com praised Plemons' acting, stating: "Plemons giving not just one but at least two and maybe three of the year's best performances goes a long way to holding Kinds of Kindness together."

Nick Rogers from Midwest Film Journal stated: "The conceit of Kinds of Kindness is that its ensemble cast...all play different roles in each story...If you can roll with often graphically violent, morbidly funny misery, Kinds of Kindness will have you keeping your head up."

NPR included Kinds of Kindness on its list of the best movies and TV of 2024, with critic Glen Weldon writing, "Lanthimos' outlook on humanity is, as ever, a bleakly funny one, and here he's dispassionately showing us the violent extremes we all too easily resort to."

=== Accolades ===
List of awards and nominations for Kinds of Kindness
Award or film festival	Date of ceremony	Category	Recipient(s)	Result	Ref.
Cannes Film Festival	25 May 2024	Palme d'Or	Yorgos Lanthimos	Nominated	
Cannes Film Festival	25 May 2024	Best Actor	Jesse Plemons	Won	
Sydney Film Festival	16 June 2024	Best Film	Kinds of Kindness	Nominated	
Miskolc International Film Festival	14 September 2024	Emeric Pressburger Prize	Kinds of Kindness	Nominated	
Florida Film Critics Circle	20 December 2024	Best Supporting Actor	Willem Dafoe	Nominated	
Golden Globe Awards	5 January 2025	Best Actor in a Motion Picture – Musical or Comedy	Jesse Plemons	Nominated	
Set Decorators Society of America	2 February 2025	Best Achievement in Décor/Design of a Comedy or Musical Feature Film	Lisa Sessions Morgan, Beth Mickle, Bradley Rubin	Nominated	
