= Alps (film) =

2011 film by Yorgos Lanthimos

- Directed by: Yorgos Lanthimos
- Written by: Yorgos Lanthimos; Efthymis Filippou
- Produced by: Athina Rachel Tsangari; Yorgos Lanthimos
- Starring: Angeliki Papoulia; Aris Servetalis; Johnny Vekris; Ariane Labed
- Cinematography: Christos Voudouris
- Edited by: Yorgos Mavropsaridis
- Production company: Haos Film
- Release date: 3 September 2011 (Venice)
- Running time: 93 minutes
- Country: Greece
- Language: Greek

Alps (Greek: Άλπεις, translit. Alpeis) is a 2011 Greek psychological drama film directed by Yorgos Lanthimos, produced by Athina Rachel Tsangari and Lanthimos, and written by Lanthimos and Efthymis Filippou. It stars Angeliki Papoulia, Aris Servetalis, Johnny Vekris, and Ariane Labed. The film premiered in competition at the 68th Venice International Film Festival, where it won the Golden Osella for Best Screenplay, and it also won the Official Competition Prize for New Directions in Cinema at the 2012 Sydney Film Festival.

== Plot ==
A rhythmic gymnast practices a routine set to Carl Orff's Carmina Burana. Afterward, she tells her coach that she would rather use a pop song, but he says she is not ready for pop and threatens to break her arms and legs if she questions him again. She apologizes.

Alps, an unusual and secretive organization of which the gymnast and her coach are part, has its meetings in the gym where the gymnast practices. For a fee, Alps will have one of its four members act as a "substitute" for a recently deceased individual during visits with their loved ones to help with the grieving process. In addition to the gymnast and her coach (who chooses "Matterhorn" as his nickname), the only other members of the group are a hospital nurse ("Monte Rosa"), and an EMT ("Mont Blanc").

Mont Blanc, the domineering and detail-oriented leader of Alps, treats a young female tennis player who has been in a serious car accident and is not expected to live. He discusses the case with Monte Rosa, who is on the tennis player's care team at the hospital, and the nurse, who has few obligations other than taking care of her ageing and widowed father, begins to study the teenager to collect information that will improve the substitution that may be forthcoming. The gymnast tries to stay on Mont Blanc's good side so she can substitute for the tennis player after she passes, but Monte Rosa begins to feel attached, and tells the girl and her parents that she will survive. The tennis player dies, and Monte Rosa offers her services to the grieving parents, while telling the rest of Alps that the girl has recovered.

Some of Alps' clients are: a man who is mourning an old friend; a blind woman whose philandering husband has died; and the owner of a lamp shop, who has lost his diabetic girlfriend. The clientele instruct the members of Alps about what they should wear, do, and say, and construct scenarios and reenactments that sometimes cross into emotionally intimate territory, though the interactions tend to be emotionless and transactional. Although sexual relations with clients are forbidden, Matterhorn regularly kisses the blind woman, and Monte Rosa has sex with the lamp shop owner.

Monte Rosa visits the tennis player's parents surreptitiously several times, learning to act like the girl. They even have her reenact a scene with the dead girl's boyfriend, after which Monte Rosa takes the boy to the home in which she lives with her father and sleeps with him. The other members of Alps grow suspicious when Monte Rosa fails to show up to their meetings and lies about her whereabouts, so Mont Blanc follows her to the tennis player's house and learns the truth. He arranges to meet with Monte Rosa in the gym and, after hitting her in the face with one of the gymnast's training clubs, ejects her from the group and has the gymnast take over her role as the tennis player.

After stitching up the wound on her cheek, Monte Rosa returns home. She asks her father about her deceased mother's favourite actor and singer before attempting to fondle him, and he slaps her. Then, she visits a ballroom she had previously patronised with her father and aggressively tries to dance with his dance partner and new girlfriend, not stopping even after the woman has fallen to the ground.

Finally, Monte Rosa returns to the tennis player's house. When no one answers the front door, she breaks through a sliding-glass door, setting off an alarm. She goes to the tennis player's room and gets into bed, but, just after she gets under the covers, the tennis player's parents enter, and the father, with Monte Rosa manically repeating the lines from her scene with the tennis player's boyfriend, forcibly throws her out. The parents lower a metal shutter over the sliding-glass door, leaving Monte Rosa shuffling back and forth on the patio.

The gymnast performs elegantly to "Popcorn", while Matterhorn looks on proudly. After finishing, she runs into his arms and tells him he is the best coach in the world, echoing an earlier bizarre, sadomasochistic moment. Her smile fades.

== Cast ==
- Angeliki Papoulia as the nurse, aka "Monte Rosa"
- Aris Servetalis as the EMT, aka "Mont Blanc"
- Johnny Vekris as the gymnastics coach, aka "Matterhorn"
- Ariane Labed as the gymnast
- Maria Kyrozi as the tennis player
- Sotiris Papastamatiou as the tennis player's father⁣
- Tina Papanikolaou as the tennis player's mother⁣
- Stavros Psyllakis as the nurse's father⁣
- Fotis Zahos as Zahos' friend
- Eftychia Stefanidou as the blind woman⁣
- Efthymis Filippou as the lamp shop owner
- Konstadina Papoulia as the nurse's father's girlfriend⁣
- Nikos Galgadis as the tennis player's boyfriend⁣

== Production ==
Yorgos Lanthimos and Efthymis Filippou developed the premise for the film out of the idea of people who allege something which is fabricated, for example via prank calls or by announcing their own deaths, and the story took form as they attempted to find a setting that they felt could work well cinematically. Lanthimos considers Alps to be the complete opposite of his previous film, saying Dogtooth (2009) "is the story of a person who tries to escape a fictitious world. Alps is about a person who tries to enter a fabricated world."

The film was produced by producer Athina Rachel Tsangari's production company Haos Film, which had previously produced Lanthimos' 2005 film Kinetta. The budget included funding from the Greek Film Center.

Filming began in October 2010. Some scenes were created on the set, and some dialogue was improvised by the actors.

== Reception ==
Alps premiered on 3 September 2011 in competition at the 68th Venice International Film Festival. Lee Marshall of Screen Daily called it "a sort of Dogtooth 2", writing that "the cultured urban audiences turned on by the sheer kookiness of that film may feel a slight sense of déjà vu here." Marshall went on to say that "Hollywood might have fashioned a weepie or a thriller out of the same material - and there are echoes here of some of Hitchcock's fascination with surrogates, from the Roger Thornhill/George Kaplan of North by Northwest to the Madeleine/Carlotta of Vertigo. But Alps is so intriguing because of what it refuses to explain ... It's also a film which manages to juggle absurdist comedy with bleak tragedy, a yearning desire for human warmth with outbreaks of sudden violence, all the while maintaining an impressive control of tone."

Roger Ebert gave the film two-and-a-half stars out of four, finding the film's thematic meaning difficult to discern. He concluded that, although Alps "is provocative and challenging, it is so completely self-contained that it has no particular emotional payoff ... Alps has the effect of a sterile exercise."

On the review aggregator website Rotten Tomatoes, 75% of 48 critics' reviews are positive, with an average rating of 7/10. Metacritic, which uses a weighted average, assigned the film a score of 69 out of 100, based on 16 critics, indicating "generally favorable" reviews.

=== Accolades ===
Award	Category	Result
Venice Film Festival	Golden Osella for Best Script	Won
Venice Film Festival	Golden Lion	Nominated
Sydney Film Festival	Official Competition Award	Won
Sofia International Film Festival	Special Mention	Won
