= Yorgos Mavropsaridis =

Greek film editor

- Γιώργος Μαυροψαρίδης
- Born: 21 November 1954 (age 71); Athens, Greece
- Occupation: Film editor

Yorgos Mavropsaridis (Greek: Γιώργος Μαυροψαρίδης, romanized: Giorgos Mavropsaridis; born 21 November 1954) is a Greek film editor. He is known for his collaborations with director Yorgos Lanthimos, having edited all his films to date.

For The Favourite (2018) and Poor Things (2023) he was nominated for the Academy Award for Best Film Editing.

== Career ==
He is a graduate of the London Film School and honed his skills working in commercials. He is often known by the nickname "Blackfish", which is the literal English translation of his surname.

== Filmography ==
=== Films ===
Year	English title	Original title	Director(s)	Notes
1984	Edo einai Valkania!	Εδώ είναι Βαλκάνια	Vasilis Boudouris	
1985	The Enchantress	Η σκιάχτρα	Manousos Manousakis	
1986	Telecannibals	Τηλέ Κανίβαλοι	Nikos Zervos	
1987	Terirem	Τεριρέμ	Apostolos Doxiadis	
1989	Love Me Not?	Μ' Αγαπάς;	Giorgos Panousopoulos	
1990	The Athenians	Αθηναίοι	Vassilis Alexakis	
1991	U-Turn	Κλειστή στροφή	Nikos Grammatikos	
1992	Oneiro II		Freddy Vianellis	
1993	A Time to Kill	Η Εποχή των Δολοφόνων	Nikos Grammatikos	
1996	Truants	Απόντες	Nikos Grammatikos	
1999	The Mating Game	Η διακριτική γοητεία των αρσενικών	Olga Malea	
1999	Female Company	Θηλυκή Εταιρεία	Nikos Perakis	
2000	Risotto	Ριζότο	Olga Malea	
2001	My Best Friend	Ο Καλύτερός Μου Φίλος	Yorgos Lanthimos and Lakis Lazopoulos	
2001	Tomorrow Is Another Day	Κι Αύριο Μέρα Είναι	Dora Masklavanou	
2002	The Bubble	Η Φούσκα	Nikos Perakis	
2003	Liza and All the Others	Η Λίζα και Όλοι οι Άλλοι	Nikos Perakis	
2003	A Touch of Spice	Πολίτικη Κουζίνα	Tasos Boulmetis	
2004	Hardcore		Dennis Iliadis	
2005	Honey and the Pig	Λουκουμάδες Με Μέλι	Olga Malea	
2005	Kinetta	Κινέττα	Yorgos Lanthimos	
2005	Sirens in the Aegean	Λούφα και Παραλλαγή: Σειρήνες στο Αιγαίo	Nikos Perakis	
2006	Extended Play	Πέντε Λεπτά Ακόμα	Yannis Xanthopoulos	
2006	Uranya	Ουρανία	Costas Kapakas	
2007	Alter Ego		Nicholas Dimitropoulos and George Korgianitis	
2007	Little Greek Godfather	Πρώτη Φορά Νονός	Olga Malea	
2007	Cool	Ψυχραιμία	Nikos Perakis	
2008	Just Broke Up	Μόλις Χώρισα	Vasilis Myrianthopoulos	
2008	I-4: Loafing and Camouflage	Ι-4: Λούφα Και Απαλλαγή	Vasilis Katsikis	
2008	Βank Bang		Argyris Papadimitropoulos	
2009	Soula Come Again (SEX)	Σούλα Έλα Ξανά	Vasilis Myrianthopoulos	
2009	Dogtooth	Κυνόδοντας	Yorgos Lanthimos	
2009	The Island	Νήsos	Christos Dimas	
2010	Harisma	Χάρισμα	Christina Ioakeimidi	
2011	The Horsemen of Pylos	Οι Ιππείς της Πύλου	Nikos Kalogeropoulos	
2011	Alps	Άλπεις	Yorgos Lanthimos	
2012	Fynbos		Harry Patramanis	
2012	God Loves Caviar	Ο Θεός Αγαπάει το Χαβιάρι	Yannis Smaragdis	
2013	Marjoram	Ματζουράνα	Olga Malea	
2013	The Enemy Within	Ο Εχθρός μου	Giorgos Tsemperopoulos	
2013	+1		Dennis Iliadis	
2013	Luton		Michalis Konstantatos	
2014	Summum Bonum		Matías Penachino	
2014	Sivas		Kaan Müjdeci	
2014	The Sentimentalists	Οι Αισθηματίες	Nicholas Triandafyllidis	
2014	Modris		Juris Kursietis	
2015	The Lobster		Yorgos Lanthimos	
2015	Chevalier		Athina Rachel Tsangari	Co-edited with Matthew Johnson
2015	Motherland	Ana Yurdu	Senem Tüzen	
2016	Los Feliz		Edgar Honetschläger	Co-edited with Stefan Fauland and Edgar Honetschläger
2016	Mythopathy	Νοτιάς	Tassos Boulmetis	
2016	Mellow Mud	Es esmu šeit	Renārs Vimba	
2016	The Other Me	Έτερος Εγώ	Sotiris Tsafoulias	
2016	Park		Sofia Exarchou	
2016	Xamou	Ξα μου	Clio Fanouraki	
2017	The Killing of a Sacred Deer		Yorgos Lanthimos	
2017	Women Who Passed My Way	Γυναίκες Που Περάσατε Από δω	Stavros Tsiolis	
2018	The Favourite		Yorgos Lanthimos	
2018	The Waiter		Steve Krikris	
2019	Monos		Alejandro Landes	Co-edited with Ted Guard and Santiago Otheguy
2019	Noah Land	Nuh Tepesi	Cenk Ertürk	
2019	Exit Plan	Selvmordsturisten	Jonas Alexander Arnby	
2019	Siege on Liperti Street	Πολιορκία στην Οδό Λιπέρτη	Stavros Pamballis	
2020	All the Pretty Little Horses	Μικρά Όμορφα Άλογα	Michalis Konstantatos	
2021	The Cursed		Sean Ellis	Co-edited with Richard Mettler
2021	She Will		Charlotte Colbert	
2022	Silence 6–9	Ησυχία 6–9	Hristos Passalis	Co-edited with Marios Kleftakis
2022	Iguana Tokyo		Kaan Müjdeci	Co-edited with Doruk Kaya
2023	Poor Things		Yorgos Lanthimos	
2023	Light Falls		Phedon Papamichael	
2024	Kinds of Kindness		Yorgos Lanthimos	
2024	She Loved Blossoms More	Αγαπούσε τα Λουλούδια Περισσότερο	Yannis Veslemes	
2024	Triumph	Триумф	Petar Valchanov and Kristina Grozeva	
2024	The Exalted	Cildenie	Juris Kursietis	
2025	Bugonia		Yorgos Lanthimos	
2026	The Invite		Olivia Wilde	Co-edited with Anthony Boys
2026	Stand Up		Mari Sanders	
2026	Black Money for White Nights	Cherni pari za beli noshti	Petar Valchanov and Kristina Grozeva	
2026	The Lost Son	Izgubljeni sin	Darko Štante	

=== Short films ===
Year	English title	Original title	Director(s)	Notes
1981	Finale?		Sotiris Goritsas	
1982	Eimai kourasmenos		Vassilis Alexakis	
1984	Homo valium		Aris Emmanouil	
1986	To mystiko tou hamenou xoanou tis vasilissas tou Sava		Reina Eskenazy	
1987	To perlo		Nikos Karapanagiotis	
1988	Cup of Coffee		Giorgos Panousopoulos	
1988	Koino stohos		Dimitra Arapoglou	
1988	Askisi pyrkagias		Antonis Kioukas	
1990	Tiflomiga		Dimitra Arapoglou	
1990	Shablo		Odysseas Lappas	
1995	The Rape of Chloe	Ο βιασμός της Χλόης	Yorgos Lanthimos	First collaboration with Lanthimos
1995	The Stranger		Myrna Tsapa	
1997	Prosehos		Vanessa Zouganeli	
2002	Uranisco Disco		Yorgos Lanthimos	
2013	The Benaki Museum		Athina Rachel Tsangari	
2014	Maasai		Harry Lagoussis	
2014	II		Efthimis Kosemund Sanidis	
2018	Time of Day		Thimios Bakatakis	
2019	Olla		Ariane Labed	
2019	Nimic		Yorgos Lanthimos	
2022	Bleat	Βληχή	Yorgos Lanthimos	

=== Music Videos ===
Year	Title	Director	Artist	Album
1996	"I paramythenia"	Yorgos Lanthimos	Katerina Kyrmizi	Kontsérto Gia Sokoláta Kai Triantáfylla
1998	"Deka Entoles"	Yorgos Lanthimos	Despina Vandi	Deka Entoles
1997	"To tragoudi ston aera"	Yorgos Lanthimos		
