= Apples (film) =

2020 film directed by Christos Nikou

- Film poster
- Greek: Μήλα / Mila
- Directed by: Christos Nikou
- Written by: Christos Nikou; Stavros Raptis
- Produced by: Iraklis Mavroeidis; Angelos Venetis; Aris Dagios; Nikos Smpiliris; Christos Nikou
- Starring: Aris Servetalis
- Cinematography: Bartosz Świniarski
- Edited by: Giorgos Zafeiris
- Production companies: Boo Productions; Lava Films; Perfo Production; Greek Film Centre; Polish Film Institute; ERT; Dirty Films; MEDIA
- Distributed by: Feelgood Entertainment
- Release dates: 2 September 2020 (Venice); 19 November 2020 (Greece)
- Running time: 90 minutes
- Countries: Greece; Poland; Slovenia
- Language: Greek

Apples (Greek: Μήλα, romanized: Mila) is a 2020 internationally co-produced drama film directed and produced by Christos Nikou in his directorial debut, from a screenplay by Nikou and Stavros Raptis. It stars Aris Servetalis, Sofia Georgovasili, Anna Kalaitzidou, and Argiris Bakirtzis. Cate Blanchett serves as an executive producer with her production company Dirty Films involved in making the film.

The film had its world premiere at the Venice Film Festival on 2 September 2020. It was scheduled to be released in Greece on 19 November 2020, by Feelgood Entertainment. It was selected as the Greek entry for the Best International Feature Film at the 93rd Academy Awards, but it was not nominated.

== Plot ==
Aris enrolls in a recovery program for unclaimed patients to create identities during a pandemic that causes amnesia.

== Cast ==
- Aris Servetalis as Aris
- Sofia Georgovassili as Anna
- Anna Kalaitzidou
- Argyris Bakirtzis
- Kostas Laskos

== Release ==
The film had its world premiere at the 77th Venice International Film Festival on 2 September 2020. It also screened at the Toronto International Film Festival on 9 September 2020, as part of TIFF Industry Selects. and at AFI Fest on 20 October 2020. In October 2020, Cohen Media Group acquired U.S. distribution rights to the film. It was released in Greece on 19 November 2020. It was released in the US on 24 June 2022.

== Reception ==
The film holds 93% approval rating on review aggregator Rotten Tomatoes, based on 98 reviews, with an average of 7.4/10. The website's critics consensus reads, "Apples explores human identity from a surreal and often humorous perspective, with peculiar yet ultimately thought-provoking results." On Metacritic, the film holds a rating of 79 out of 100, based on 18 critics, indicating "generally favorable reviews".

== See also ==
- List of submissions to the 93rd Academy Awards for Best International Feature Film
- List of Greek submissions for the Academy Award for Best International Feature Film
