= S1ngles =

- Also known as: s1NgLEs
- Created by: Giorgos Fidas
- Directed by: Panagiotis Kravvas (season 1); Stefanos Blatsos (season 2–4)
- Starring: Maria Solomou; Sunny Chatziargiri; Panagiota Vlanti; Aris Servetalis; Maximos Moumouris; Sokratis Patsikas; Odisseas Papaspiliopoulos; Antonis Fragkakis; Stefi Poulopoulou; Giorgos Seitaridis; Stamatis Zakolikos
- Theme music composer: John Ververis; Vangelis Pappas (season 1–3); Kostas Mastrogiannis; Sunny Chatziargiri; Dimitris Koutsiouris (season 4)
- Opening theme: Singles (season 1); Singles (Marsheaux Remix) (season 2–3); Dancing in the Air (season 4)
- Country of origin: Greece
- Original language: Greek
- No. of seasons: 4
- No. of episodes: 75

Production
- Production locations: Attica, Naxos
- Cinematography: Vangelis Katritzidakis; Evgenios Dionisopoulos
- Running time: 41–55 / minutes

Original release
- Network: Mega Channel
- Release: January 18, 2005 – June 11, 2008

Singles (also written s1NgLEs) it is the title of a Greek youth comedy television series aired by Mega Channel in the 2004–2008 seasons. It was created by Giorgos Fidas and directed by Panagiotis Kravvas in the first season and Stefanos Blatsos afterwards. The series presents the lives of a group of young people, their work and relationships, love and social. In each episode are described by the heroes (mainly Rania), theories of life and we see how it is applied to the life of each character and his social environment, while through the series various social issues are touched upon such as friendship, sexuality, family and mainly the relationships of people nowadays. The main characters of the series are Rania (Maria Solomou) and Lila (Sunny Chatziargiri). In each cycle of the series the lead cast receives changes with addition and subtraction of characters, with the above two roles remaining in the series from beginning to end.

== Series overview ==
Season	Episodes	Original air date		Viewership (average)
Season	Episodes	Premiere	Finale	Viewership (average)
1	21	18 January 2005	21 June 2005	21.7%
2	28	4 October 2006	20 June 2007	22.8%
3	11	3 October 2007	30 January 2008	20.6%
4	15	6 February 2008	11 June 2008	18.4%

== Development ==
While the first season of the series was scheduled to premiere in the fall of 2004 along with the rest of the station's series, filming significantly delayed the delivery of the episodes due to the theatrical obligations of the protagonists. Thus, it was moved to the second half of the 2004–05 season and premiered in January 2005 and concluded in 21 episodes in June 2005. Its good performance in weekly televarometers and its increase in popularity (even through the online website created by the contributors – pioneer for the time) convinced the station to renew it for a second season, which, however, did not air the following season due to the pregnancy of Maria Solomou at the end of the first season. This resulted in the series being completed differently and Rania's role as a pregnant woman being reconstructed.

Finally, the second season titled Singles 2 started in October 2006 with the lead cast having undergone changes and the series presenting the lives of the heroes five years after the end of the first season, with Stefanos Blatsos as director. It ended in 28 episodes in June 2007.

The third season, titled Singles 2½, began in October 2007 and was the continuation of the story of Singles 2, and concluded in 11 episodes in January 2008. The fourth and final season of the series began in February 2008, titled Singles 3, and ended with 15 episodes in June 2008 after a total of 75 episodes.

== Cast ==
=== Main ===
- Maria Solomou as Rania Konstantakatou
- Sunny Chatziargiri as Lila Steni
- Panagiota Vlanti as Maro Petropoulou
- Aris Servetalis as Fotis Lagoudakis
- Maximos Moumouris as Orestis Stergiou
- Sokratis Patsikas as Billy (Vasilis) Chatziantoniou
- Odisseas Papaspiliopoulos as Arthouros Papaikonomou
- Antonis Fragkakis as Lucas Seretis
- Stefi Poulopoulou as Katerina Koukoutsaki
- Giorgos Seitaridis as Nontas Peristeropoulos
- Stamatis Zakolikos as Spiros
- Giorgos Chrysostomou as Makis Chatzoglou
- Antonis Karystinos as James White

=== Recurring ===
- Ersi Malikenzou as Nelli Petropoulou
- Giorgos Konstantis as Arthouros' father
- Eleni Kallia as Angeliki Sereti
- Panagiotis Bougiouris as Giannis Seretis
- Christina Panagiotidou as Gogo
- Marinos Desillas as Miltos Samaras
- Fani Spiridaki as Louisa
- Nikos Katrakis as Antonis Mavros
- Panos Mouzourakis as Tzaba (Varitimos)
- Vlasis Fidas as Angelos Seretis
- Filippos Gotsopoulos as Lucas Seretis jr.

=== Guest star ===
- Mirto Alikaki as Sophia
- Leonardo Sfontouris as Petros
- Regina Pantelidi as Nantia
- Eri Bakali as Eri Magana
- Dimitris Vogiatzis as Fontas Stergiou
- Vana Rabota as Irini
- Tasos Pirgieris as Elias
- Maria Korinthiou as Maria
- Giorgos Manikas as Vasilis
- Dimitris Plionis as Dimitris
- Angeliki Dimitrakopoulou as Thalia
- Vangelis Takos as Pavlos Markidis
- Orfeas Papadopoulos as Genius Stenis
- Evangelia Stamatelou as Regina
- Iro Mane as Chrisoula Koukoutsaki
- Anna Andrianou as Antigoni Mayhem
- Panagiotis Dedevesis as Nikos
- Nontas Katsifis as Minos
- Evgenia Dimitropoulou as Agapi
- Kostas Grekas as Michalis
- Giorgos Bavelis as Konstantinos
- and Akis Sakellariou as company general manager

== Episodes ==
=== Season 1 (2004–05) ===
- Air date: Tuesday at 10:40pm

No. overall	No. in season	Title	Original air date	Viewership (average)	Ratiting
1	1	"One Or Two?"	18 January 2005	24.4%	8.6
The best things come in couples or are we happier alone? And since when did backgammon start brainwashing us? The happiest day in the life of the romantic and sensitive Maro begins with a marriage proposal from Petros, the man she considers her ideal other half. But when Rania convinces her to raid his office to find out if he is faithful to her, Maro discovers that some doors may be better left unopened. Meanwhile, the fanatical bachelor Orestis tries to make ends meet with Sophia, who is chasing him to marry him, but also with the henchmen of her rich dad, who end up sending him to the hospital. The roads of Orestis and Maro seem to intersect all the time, but they do not manage to meet...
2	2	"Dating With Destiny"	25 January 2005	21.3%	8.5
Is life a train running on the lines of destiny? And if so, are we drivers or passengers? Maro tries to overcome her separation with Petros but also the difficulties of cohabiting with Rania, who hosts her until she finds a cheap, decent apartment. Orestis tries to get rid of Sophia who has settled in his apartment and arranges their marriage, something that excites all his surroundings, except -of course- himself! And while a charming jogger disturbs Rania's peace of mind, Lila, the annoying neighbor which Rania would gladly kill, throws Maro the cards. Who is the mysterious light-haired man who constantly falls on Maro's heart and how she ended up locked in the hallway with her grandmother's wedding dress?
3	3	"The Fatal Attraction Of Opposites"	1 February 2005	22.4%	8.9
Opposites attract? And if so, we are doomed to fall in love with people we dislike? Take a romantic woman who locked herself out of her house in her grandmother's wedding dress. He added a fanatical bachelor with a paranoid phobia towards everything related to marriage, who discovers a bride at his door. Mix well with a hysterical ex-wife who thinks the previous two are about to get married, two tough henchmen and a furious little mobster father. The strongest cocktail of love, adventure and misunderstanding...
4	4	"Multiple Choice Test"	8 February 2005	N/A	
It's time for the s1NgLEs to come up with their choices. In the shadow of her mother's engagement party, Maro must choose between the safety of a marriage with Petros and the risk of a love affair with the charming Orestis. At the same time, Arthouros tries to ask Louisa out but the results are disastrous and Rania accepts an interesting proposal from a charming stranger...
5	5	"Scenes From Three Saturdays"	15 February 2005	20.4%	8.5
If the whole world is a scene, we write the script of our life ourselves or is it written by someone else who does not like us very much? On the first Saturday, Orestis and Rania search for the missing Maro, not knowing that she spent the night at Petros' house. On the second Saturday, Rania gives Lucas a chance to meet her, Lila solves Arthouros' love affairs (on a theoretical level) and Orestis pays a visit to Maro's mother. Finally, on the third Saturday, Gogo surprises Miltos and Spiros by returning home earlier and Maro takes destiny into her own hands, starting her engagement in the most episodic way...
6	6	"All One (Koulouvachata)"	22 February 2005	N/A	
There's only one thing worse than being separated from the man of your life. And that's breaking up with him the day your mother throws a huge reception to celebrate your engagement. Maro arrives at her engagement without a son-in-law but does not dare to tell the truth, fearing her mother's disappointment, her irritatingly perfect sister's derision and the satisfaction of Orestis, who has infiltrated the engagement as a Dj. And as if all this were not enough, Spiros confronts Gogo and Miltos, Orestis fights with Arthouros, Rania learns that Spiros is gay and Maro announces the time when he appears at the door...
7	7	"Skeletons In Our Closet"	1 March 2005	20.5%	8.3
We keep secrets from others either so as not to hurt them or to protect ourselves. But do secrets instead of protecting hurt more? The day after the party, the s1NgLEs wake up with a huge hangover and most of them in foreign homes. And they begin to have secrets between them, when Spiros' confessesion to Rania, Lila realizes that he spent the night with Alexia's fiancé, Gogo asks Miltos about his strange behavior lately and Maro wakes up naked in the Orestis' house, who refuses to give her clothes cause of her hysterical behavior, until the moment Arthouros knocks on the door. As if all this were not enough, Arthouros tries to convince his father to give him the keys to the forbidden warehouse in the basement of their house, Miltos has set it up outside Spiros' house and his father sees them and while Lila tries to convince Maro to make up with Orestis, he receives a surprise visit from Nantia...
8	8	"The Season Of Fear"	8 March 2005	N/A	
How ours can be a life ruled by fears? And can we really overcome them or are we doomed to live forever in their icy shadow? Maro is afraid to ask for a raise and put a definitive end to her relationship with Petros. She is also afraid of the strange noises she hears in her house at night and the masked man (Ghostface) who does not know if he is really visiting her or in her dreams. Rania is afraid to start a relationship with Lucas and get hurt again. And Arthouros fears his father and the secret forbidden warehouse that remains locked after his mother's death. But the time has come for S1NgLEs to face their biggest fears...
9	9	"The Sins Of Parents..."	15 March 2005	18.3%	7.5
In the beginning was Original Sin. We bit the Apple and were driven out of Eden. While Rania goes on her first date with Lucas, Maro and Lila are caught up in a nightmarish meal with Mrs Nelli and Alexia, who pressure Maro to return to Petros. Arthouros' father discovers the s1NgLEs have sneaked into the forbidden warehouse, Lucas has a big secret from Rania, while Spiros' mother discovers that some apples of knowledge are better left in place and never touched. Orestis gives Maro the story of the day when God forgave the first-created for the Original Sin.
10	10	"... Chastise Children"	22 March 2005	26.8%	10.3
The saying goes that the sins of parents chastise children. But can we really avoid the mistakes of the past or are we doomed to repeat them? When Orestis undertakes to watch his nephews for a day, the s1NgLEs are faced with the greatest challenge they have ever encountered: two smiling children with the destructive fury of Attila. The score is quickly formed in kids – singles = 1 – 0. While Orestis' house faces complete destruction, his niece suffers an allergic crisis, Rania's second date with Lucas is cut in half, Lila gets Arthouros into a bar fight, Lucas is surprised by Rania's views on children and Maro wonders if she should make the mistake of leaving Orestis' love...
11	11	"Hairspray's Theory"	29 March 2005	17.5%	7.1
Wouldn't it be great if the magic hairspray could be found that with a spray would not let us get hurt, protecting us with our personal impenetrable barbed wire? Maro starts her relationship with Orestis but insists that they keep hiding it from their friends until they see how it goes. Instead, Arthouros wakes up in Lila's bed and the whole world finds out! While a bouquet of Flowers leads Rania and Lucas to their first fight, Orestis convinces Arthouros to use his bruise from the wood he ate at the bar to impress Louisa. Also, Spiros meets with Elias, Orestis vacuums in Lila's house and the time has come for s1NgLEs to understand that life leaves scars and if they do not leave a few holes in their protective barbed wire, it can become their prison...
12	12	"My Loneliness Is All"	12 April 2005	17.0%	7.1
Have you ever felt alone on a Saturday night? That all the rest of the world is out having fun except you? Lucas doesn't answer Rania's phones and Lilas' thermometer shows 39,5. Rania and Lila face a fate worse than death: spending an entire Saturday night together. Maro and Orestis realize that when the other does not understand you, you can feel lonely even in a relationship. And Arthouros wanders alone through the streets of the city and wonders why he doesn't deserve better. The s1NgLEs face their greatest enemy, loneliness, and each faces it in their own way. Maro will prepare a romantic dinner, Arthouros will start psychoanalysis and Rania will meet Lucas and transform into a little girl. Obstacles in their way are selfishness, insecurity, fear of not getting hurt and a boxer with penguins. But who knows? There may still be hope of melting the ice at the North Pole...
13	13	"Unexpected"	19 April 2005	17.0%	6.6
Is our life a series that God sees on a heavenly TV with millions of screens? A series that, whenever bored, fills it with twists and unexpected? A business trip to Geneva for Orestis and Gogo will upset the company and bring their relations with Maro and Miltos into crisis! Lila is fired and decides to find a job her own way, and Spiros finds himself trapped in a net of lies and outside pressures. Miltos pressures him to find them and Rania pressures him to tell Gogo the truth. And as if that wasn't enough, a broken mirror will set in motion a chain of events that will change the lives of s1NgLEs forever...
14	14	"Appearances Are Deceiving"	26 April 2005	19.5%	7.5
Three different people may have three different images for the same situation. And be all wrong or all right! You can change reality by changing the way you perceive it? The time has come for some of the s1NgLEs to learn that appearances are sometimes deceiving when some of them learn about Spiros' relationship with Miltos, Maro finds in Orestis' pocket the card of his ex-girlfriend, Arthouros follows Lila's advice to impress a girl he likes, Orestis learns that Lucas has a child, Maro discovers the real relationship between Mavros and the headmistress, and Louisa finds Arthouros and Lila kissing...
15	15	"In The Image And Likeness"	3 May 2005	18.6%	7.1
Do we really know the people around us? Or do we only know the image they want to show us? Get ready for Arthouros' date with Louisa, the most adventurous date in the history of human sociability! Where things go so wrong that it will take the help of Orestis and Lila to get Arthouros out of the way. Will Maro manage to transform Orestis into the perfect son-in-law for her mother? Will Lucas be able to tell Rania about his son? And what will Rania do when she finds out that she has transformed into Lucas' little girl, whose things have by the way begun to spread dangerously throughout the house? And most of all; will Arthouros survive the date with Louisa?
16	16	"Truth Or Dare"	10 May 2005	22.8%	8.5
Is there really separation? Βecause the truth takes courage to tell it. And sometimes even more to listen it. Maro is feverishly preparing for her party and Orestis is preparing to impress Mrs Nelli. Luke is preparing to tell Rania about his son, and Rania, to take revenge on Mavros, is preparing to bring him as a secretary, the worst employee in the history of the universe! But no one's ready for what's going to happen at Maro's birthday party! For the s1NgLEs has come the hour of truth! The time for all the secrets to finally come to the surface and for the company to pass its biggest test!
17	17	"Without Family"	17 May 2005	N/A	
Are friends a kind of family? And if so, should we love them no matter what? The next day of Maro's birthday party finds the company broken up. It's time for the streets of s1NgLEs to split. Orestis disappears, Maro decides to tell her family the truth about Kostas and Lila with unpredictable consequences, Rania throws Lucas' things from her house and Spiros' father overhears a phone call from his son, which would have been better if he had never heard it. And without realizing where it came from, two of the s1NgLEs have sex...
18	18	"Where Did All The Men Go?"	24 May 2005	26.9%	9.9
Did someone kidnap all the normal men? Did they emigrate to another country? Or are they the women who cannot see them even when they are in front of their eyes? Maro decides to vigorously seek her ideal other half in a barrage of dates with bachelors, but despair is not long in coming. Lila and Arthouros are in love but are afraid to risk their friendship. But when a lost message comes to stand in the way of their love, Lila realizes that for the first time in her life she is deeply in love. And that amazing sex sometimes can't take away the sadness of a lost love...
19	19	"Ghosts From The Past"	31 May 2005	27.5%	10.0
It is our future that we should fear? Or do the things that can really hurt us come from the past? Rania encounters Lucas' past in the face of his son who stubbornly refuses to accept it, and Arthouros on a death certificate that makes him believe that his mother's death may have also been murder. Maro tries to convince herself that Orestis is a thing of the past and continues her life with a charming stranger she meets one night at the video store and Lila's dirty past finally proves useful. It's time for the s1NgLEs to confront their past. A past that invades their lives relentlessly and is full of surprises...
20	20	"Happy End"	14 June 2005	25.0%	9.4
What is happiness? A lasting state or is it hidden in the moments? And if our dreams come true, will we become truly happy? S1NgLEs go on a field trip. In Lucas' cottage, the company could live happy moments but Rania and Maro are at odds with Lila and are even more pissed off when she carries Mavros to them. Lila was not at all glad that Arthouros had brought Louisa. And Orestis regrets going when he learns that Philippos has proposed to Maro. And when Lila hits Arthouros with the swing, things will get even more complicated. In short this is not a simple weekend with friends. It's the survivor's game...
21	21	"21"	21 June 2005	23.5%	8.9
2 or 1? Alone or a couple? Can we be whole without our other half? And is the answer the same for everyone? Forget everything you knew so far. The deck is re-dealt and each of the s1NgLEs is asked to play their last game with destiny. The wheel of fate of the s1NgLEs makes its 21st and last turn and the cards that fall on the table are death, lovers and the world. A fire in a wedding dress shop, three brides on a truck, a trip to America, a game of twenty-one that will judge the fate of a wedding, a crossing that will seal their fate forever, Maro's wedding, a s1NgLE who returns from the past and a brand new s1NgLE that will appear to radically change Rania's life are some of the cards that fate deals to the s1NgLEs. Because everything ends and starts again here...

=== Season 2 (2006–07) ===
- Air date: Wednesday at 10:00pm (episodes 22–32), Wednesday at 10:50pm (episodes 33–49)

No. overall	No. in season	Title	Original air date	Viewership (average)	Rating
22	1	"One More"	4 October 2006	35.2%	14.6
When the rolls of life turn upside down, it's best to stop playing: or is it worth playing one more? Rania is interviewed for a promotion but is forced to take her 5-year-old overactive son to work. Fotis is on guard but receives an anonymous phone call that his girlfriend has a boyfriend at home. Lila has auditioned for a role in a film but loses her cell phone with the studio's management. Billy and Peristeropoulos have to catch Fotis' girlfriend in the act but things do not come as they expect. And Katerina has just met the man of her life but she hits him with a cell phone on the head. Six characters play doors, plakoto and leave. What will happen when their paths cross?
23	2	"Chasing The Rainbow"	18 October 2006	17.5%	8.5
Does it make sense to chase the rainbow? And what happens when you don't manage to catch it? S1NgLes go clubbing! Katerina seeks Haris, Lila and Peristeropoulos an easy one night stand and Fotis the lost communication between people. They can find all these things in a club? And what happens when Fotis' landlady throws him out of the house and Rania meets a mysterious, charming man who aggressively invades her life?
24	3	"Lines And Distances"	25 October 2006	23.1%	10.6
The line connecting two points defines the distance between them. And the question is, Is it worth covering for her? Katerina wants to find Haris but an old love will suddenly come back to the surface. Rania wants to buy a practical shapeshifting car but Lila and Lucas jr. want a red convertible. Fotis wants to forget that he woke up at Katerina's house but his girlfriend insists that they all meet together to make sure that he did not cheat on her. Lila wants Fotis and Peristeropoulos to secretly move into the next apartment but Rania comes face card with Peristeropoulos and unfortunately they open a conversation. And a thong from Gone with the Wind will make the company meet for the first time in a particularly episodic way...
25	4	"Filing In The Blanks"	1 November 2006	21.3%	9.9
Rania and Lila try to deal with Lucas' jr. aggressive behavior and wonder if they are raising him correctly. Fotis tries to convince Maria that there is no gap in their relationship, and Katerina tries to solve a crossword puzzle to prove to the rude, elderly lady that she can. Lila and Peristeropoulos decide to go on a date with explosive reactions from the rest and the mysterious woman with the photos is revealed. And an unexpected phone call from Lucas' jr. nursery will set off a new set of developments...
26	5	"Nets"	8 November 2006	22.8%	9.6
Life is full of nets. Is there always a way to escape? Two brothers (Angelos and Lucas jr.) whose law and the strong will of their grandmother prevent them from seeing each other, two soldiers (Fotis and Peristeropoulos) who risk losing their license because they fell into the net of the charm of the commander's daughter, a woman without legal rights because she chose not to marry (Rania), three friends (Lila, Katerina, Billy) who try to escape from Athens and go on vacation but things seem to be constantly overturned. S1NgLEs are entangled in various kinds of nets. Some will manage to escape. And some don't. Who will finally be able to get on the ship to Naxos?
27	6	"Other For Our Boat?"	15 November 2006	23.7%	10.9
Is it worth putting passengers on your boat? Or is it better to steer her alone and go where you want? Rania tries to recover from the conflict with Angeliki but the others do not say to let her calm down. Peristeropoulos tries to get into the company but his behavior irritates everyone else. Katerina finds Vasilis but he is madly in love with Jenny. Fotis arrives in Naxos to calm down but has to pretend to be Katerina's boyfriend. And two sailors invite Lila for a boat ride with a friend of hers and the only one available is Rania. The s1NgLEs go on vacation and the one who saves himself is saved. Some want to go shopping, some to the sights and the rest to the sea to sunbathe. Will they manage to go on vacation as a group or will they end up doing what they want alone...
28	7	"And The Orchestra Continued To Play"	22 November 2006	20.8%	10.2
When the Titanic sank, the orchestra continued to play. Were they stupid? Or did they know something more? Rania, Lila and Billy trapped in a gasoline-free inflatable in the middle of the sea. Lila is optimistic that the rescue helicopters will show up any minute, but the hours go by and no one shows up. But when the thirst and the strong sun cause Lila to lose consciousness, Rania and Billy begin to worry seriously, will the helicopters finally come? Fotis tries to tell Katerina that he likes it but something keeps interrupting the conversation. First, Jenny who comes to announce that Vasilis has disappeared and put Katerina in her place and then Maria who arrives in Naxos determined to win back Fotis at all costs. Will Fotis manage to tell Katerina what he feels? The s1NgLEs swim in the glass of their lives and either see it half empty or half full try to keep on the surface. And in the midst of all this, they find time to tell foreign tourists why they should visit the Greek islands...
29	8	"Chase"	29 November 2006	21.9%	10.3
Is love a chase? And what happens when you can't catch the one you want? Vasilis wants to break his engagement to be with Katerina but she is not sure that she is in love with him and forces Fotis to pretend that they are a couple. Rania and Lila want to spend a quiet night but the bride's mother screams that there has been a murder in the kitchen. Fotis wants to tell Katerina that he is in love with her but things get difficult when Maria arrives at the engagement. Peristeropoulos has invited the tourists he wants to throw on the bed but Rania and Lila will make him a very interesting immoral proposal that will involve all three of them. Will Jenny and Vasilis be engaged? Will Peristeropoulos succumb to the love siege of the bride's grandmother? And what is the corpse that Rania and bilis carry in the cellar? S1NgLEs invite us all to the most episodic engagement of the year where everyone is chasing each other. Who will catch who?
30	9	"Photos From The Past"	6 December 2006	19.1%	8.6
If our lives are a series of photos in the album of time, how do we know that the best ones have not already been taken? Excited by the return of Orestis, Rania and Lila seem to have completely forgotten about their new friends. But when, to save Orestis' belongings, he must empty the loft with Lucas' boxes, Rania will be forced to confront her past. Fotis does not want to return to his relationship with Maria but is forced to reconsider when at Katerina's house he finds Vasilis. Giannis enjoys an intense family dinner with his mother, Peristeropoulos pays a visit to Maria and a cassette full of images from the past comes to upset the lives of s1NgLEs. Will Rania manage to overcome her past with Lucas and move on? Will Katerina manage to overcome her past with Vasilis and kick him out of the house? Will Fotis talk to Katerina about his feelings? And has Lila gone With an Indonesian?
31	10	"The Necessary Precautions"	20 December 2006	26.4%	11.5
We can face the dangers of life? And when do we know that we have taken the necessary precautions? In an episode dedicated to HIV awareness, the s1NgLEs discuss who uses a condom and who doesn't, and Lila answers the ten stupid excuses men use not to wear condoms. Otherwise, Katerina and Fotis try to protect the tape that reveals whether they have had sex or not, keeping it out of Maria's hands but mysteriously disappears (the tape unfortunately, not Maria). Rania and Lila decide to guard Katerina from her boring relationship with Vasilis and divorce him on her behalf. But nothing will be able to protect the s1NgLEs from what will happen when Maria and Peristeropoulos will each give their own version of the day the military ID ended up under her bed...
32	11	"Visual Angle Issue"	27 December 2006	27.6%	12.1
Is reality a point of view? And if so, can we ever really understand each other? A month after the night that rocked the world of s1NgLEs, we find the characters again trying to get back to normal rhythms of life, overcoming what happened. Rania tries to deal with the problems at work and how they affect her new relationship with Giannis, Billy makes a visit to the ophthalmologist that will make him think about the way he sees reality and Orestis and Lila break into the archives of Lucas' mother's shipping company. As for what happened to Fotis and Peristeropoulos...
33	12	"Letters To Santa Claus"	24 January 2007	23.7%	9.4
Santa Claus finally exists? And is he the fat gentleman coming down our chimney? It's (late) Christmas in the world of s1NgLEs but our heroes only love days don't live! Rania is in a heated disagreement with Lila when she argues that they should tell Lucas about Santa Claus, Fotis and Peristeropoulos have no money for gifts and are forced to work at the mall as Santa Claus and Rudolph, Katerina is going through a Christmas depression and Orestis tries to convince Billy to help get into the shipping company's electronic files. And when the s1NgLEs send their letter to Santa Claus, everyone's wishes will come true but not in the way they expected...
34	13	"Separate Worlds"	31 January 2007	20.0%	8.5
If each of us lives in our own world, can our world ever meet with the others? New Year's Day is a month late in the world of s1NgLEs and everyone seems to live in separate worlds. Separate worlds for Lucas and Angelos but Rania will still make an attempt to talk to their grandmother. Separate worlds for Fotis and Billy but exchanging gifts will give them a chance to talk. Separate worlds for Katerina and Haris who has disappeared and does not say to pick up a phone. And separate worlds for Rania and Giannis, who will feel his mother's anger when she learns of their secret relationship. And separate worlds for reality and the world of s1NgLEs. Until Lila goes to editing and decides to go ahead with time, taking matters into her own hands...
35	14	"You Do It All For Money"	7 February 2007	22.8%	9.1
Katerina owes eight and a half thousand euros to the banks, Rania fights with Lila over her waste, and Giannis gets an ultimatum from his mother that, if he continues his relationship with Rania, she will cut him off from the family fortune. Katerina asks for a raise, Billy reveals to Lila that he does not know how to dance, the company plays its own board game and when s1NgLEs try to help Katerina reach a settlement with the bank, the whole company will end up with loans. The outcome of this unequal struggle will be shocking...
36	15	"Love Is A Strange Thing"	21 February 2007	23.3%	9.9
What is it that is called Love? And can we cut it and put it in small boxes like "marriage", "love", "family" and "friendship"? Or can it happen to us in intermediate ways? Valentine's Day is approaching full speed and in the world of s1NgLEs there is panic. Katerina is desperately looking for someone to spend Valentine's Day with, Giannis tells Rania that in the life he has made with Lila and the child there is no place for him, Lila is trapped in a photo shoot with a paranoid photographer and no one can come for support, Peristeropoulos and Fotis get a job in bouzoukia and Billy falls in love with a dancer. Oh, and two of the company will kiss for the first time...
37	16	"Somebody Take Care Of Us"	7 March 2007	20.1%	8.7
We all want someone to look after us. Rania and Lila are looking for someone to look after Lucas in the afternoons, but when faced with the worst baby sitters in the seven solar systems, they are forced to ask Peristeropoulos. He who saves himself is saved. Lila has caught the attention of Giannis and Markidis, who, each for his own reasons, decide to take her out of Rania's life. And a cassette from the past comes to upset the lives of s1NgLEs. Because it's time for the company to find out if Katerina and Fotis had sex that night after the bar...
38	17	"The Glass Menagerie"	14 March 2007	20.9%	9.0
We live hidden in our little glass worlds. But can you defeat the whole world with a small piece of fragile glass? Lucas' disappearance brings a crisis in Rania's relations with Lila and gives Giannis the push to propose to Rania. Billy chats with Emily, but when she asks him for a photo, instead of sending his own, he sends Makis'. At the same time, Rania and Katerina, believing that Emily will hurt him, conspire to make him a blind date with a girl who is more in his size. Fotis tries to read for ASEP's exams but the company does not say to leave him alone, Peristeropoulos gets to know Lucas more and reveals some more sensitive aspects of him, Jimmy The Wild begins to suspect that Mary may have a secret lover and one of the company will accept a marriage proposal. And the group is going to play at Tennessee Williams' The Glass Menagerie...
39	18	"Alter Ego"	21 March 2007	21.9%	9.2
When we play roles all our lives, how do we know who we really are? In the chat with Emily, Billy has sent Makis' photo instead of his. However, when Makis and Peristeropoulos blow their nose at the dance school and Emily thinks he is Billy, things will get very mixed up and Makis will have an identity crisis. Meanwhile, the henchmen of Jimmy The Wild are looking for Fotis thinking that he is Mary's lover, Billy goes on a blind date with Litsa, Lucas jr. discovers that Giannis proposed to Rania, but he has his own opinion on who his mother should marry and Peristeropoulos and Mary separate. And things get even more complicated when Emily decides to make a surprise visit to Billy's house...
40	19	"Love Triangle"	4 April 2007	N/A	
Are there rules in the erotic geometry of our lives or are we so screwed up that even Euclid could not figure it out? Lila decides that she needs a man to support her career and informs Makis that she chose him for her relationship-crutch. Makis pretends to be Billy for Emily's sake, but when Katerina and Rania unexpectedly show up at home, things get even more complicated. The henchmen bring Lila and Fotis to Jimmy The Wild, who in every way pressures Fotis to admit he is having an affair with Mary. And one shot will make the whole company rush to the hospital. Will Lila and Mary manage to save Fotis? Will Makis and bilis manage to fool Emily? And who from the company will kiss for the first time?
41	20	"Moving Targets"	11 April 2007	22.4%	9.4
Targets. Can you ever really hit them when they insist on moving around all the time? The company is targeting Jimmy The Wild. For Mary to divorce him bloodless, Rania will have to throw him on the bed. But will Rania accept to play the role? Katerina has set her sights on Haris. But she will be able to drop him with the instructions that Lila sends her via sms; Fotis has set a goal to do well in the ASEP exams but no one lets him read, Billy has set a goal to win Emily but the lies of the past will stand in the way, Peristeropoulos does not know if his goal is Mary or Rania and Lila has set a goal to stay faithful to Makis but monogamy turns out to be a difficult case in the end. Which of the company will achieve their goals? And which will become the goals of others?
42	21	"Trapped"	18 April 2007	25.0%	10.2
We spend our lives avoiding traps. But what do you do with freedom when you have it? And is it easier to be trapped? At Jimmy's villa in Nea Makri, Rania, following Lila's plan, has led him to bed for Mary to catch them and find an excuse to separate. BUT NO ONE COMES! Because Lila and Mary are trapped in the center with no phones, no money and no way to reach Nea Makri, Peristeropoulos is trapped in Jimmy's car and Lila's plan goes from bad to worse. Meanwhile, Katerina has to choose between Fotis and Haris and Mary accepts an offer to work in a center in Thessaloniki. They will keep a long-distance relationship with Peristeropoulos with the prospect of following her later or they will permanently separate?
43	22	"Dreams And Nightmares (Part A)"	25 April 2007	20.1%	8.7
Can dreams survive in the harsh world of reality? Erotic dreams, in which Peristeropoulos speaks French, torment Rania. And while she tries to resist her repulsions and prevent her dreams from becoming reality by enlisting Carl Jung and dreamcreepers, Fotis' dream of living his love with Katerina has finally come true. But it's a reality that Haris doesn't want to leave. At the same time, Billy is tormented by nightmares of humiliating failure in the dance competition and tries to overcome them to claim Emily's heart, and Lila discovers what the phrase she sees in her dreams means. But it is an answer that will lead to New, even bigger questions. S1NgLEs take the baggage of their dreams and set off on a strange journey into the unexplored world of the collective unconscious! What do s1NgLEs dream about?
44	23	"Dreams And Nightmares (Part B)"	2 May 2007	20.7%	8.8
If all people are made of the same material, why can't we get along with each other? Rania and Peristeropoulos have a date tonight and, unfortunately for the tranquility of the company, they have it between them. Angeliki learns that Giannis proposed to Rania and decides to react aggressively. Rania suffers Chinese torture by Lila for the appointment with Peristeropoulos while, at the same time, she tries to convince her son to hang out with an Albanian classmate. Fotis tries to overcome Katerina who has disappeared with Haris. The identity of Giannis will be in danger of being revealed when Billy visits Dimitris' office. And Lila unravels the thread of phrase she sees in her dreams, a thread that leads her to greater truths than she can imagine. And in between, the s1NgLEs discuss racism and realize that "the more different the other is, the more you can learn from him"...
45	24	"Truths And Lies"	9 May 2007	23.9%	9.9
All our lives we are taught that we must speak the truth. Giannis returns from Tokyo and Rania has to answer the marriage proposal but Lucas jr. has taken the ring from her and she doesn't know where it is. Angeliki reveals to Lucas the truth about his brother, turning the child against Rania and forcing her to ask for the help of Peristeropoulos. Makis' lack of trust in Lila creates a problem in their relationship. Giannis tries to prevent Billy from revealing his true identity to Rania and Fotis, disappointed by the end of his relationship with Katerina, buys a one-way ticket to Paris. And when Billy, with Giannis' encouragement, decides to reclaim Emily's heart by winning the dance competition, all roads lead to disco...
46	25	"Happy End"	23 May 2007	13.0%	6.5
When does a story end? And are we sure that after the ending titles, the heroes of the film continue to be happy? The turn of Billy and Lila to present their number in the dance competition has come. But they are invisible. Giannis wants to know if Rania did kiss Peristeropoulos as Emily claims. But she has to leave with Katerina to catch Fotis before he leaves for France. Lucas jr. is still angry with Rania for hiding the truth about his brother from him. But Lila decides to take matters into her own hands. Katerina faces another offensive attack from the director of the newspaper she works for, and Angeliki gives him a "gift" that will radically affect his relationship with Rania. This isn't the last episode of s1NgLEs, but it's the last chance to get off the ground for those who hate stories that don't end with a happy end. The next stations of the journey will be in very dangerous areas...
47	26	"Brothers, Tramps And Migratory Birds"	30 May 2007	27.3%	11.2
When Rania is caught up in an invitation to her manager's house with Peristeropoulos as her companion, she is forced to take a very realistic look at this relationship because of everything that will happen there. Lila, undercover, puts her plan in place for the two brothers to meet, but an unexpected visitor from her past will upset her especially. And even more so the mysterious box he hides in her house. And when Peristeropoulos and Giannis meet for the first time in Rania's office, the situation will become particularly acute with unpredictable consequences. And the girls will need to put into practice the plan "separate him without getting hurt, in just ten days"...
48	27	"Disclosure Now"	13 June 2007	19.8%	7.5
The moments of our lives are revealed to us without being asked. What happens when you can't control Destiny's next knock on your door? The company is waiting for Lila for her surprise birthday party but when the door opens instead of Lila and Lucas jr. reveals two police officers. Billy and Makis follow Giannis to Angeliki's house and whether he is really in love with Rania is revealed. And it's time to reveal exactly what Angeliki is planning, who knows the contents of the secret will, why Markidis visits Rania's house with a pistol, which s1NgLEs will travel far, far, far and what is inside the box of Genius. The world of s1NgLEs will be shaken to the ground by an episode full of revelations...
49	28	"Games Of Fate"	20 June 2007	31.4%	10.1
Someone leaves, someone gets married, and someone dies. S1NgLEs begin their last and most important batch with Destiny. The cards to be dealt are already known: marriage-death-flight. What remains to be learned is to whom they will share and how he will deal with them. Rania's confrontation with Angeliki culminates in unpredictable consequences, Katerina and Fotis make a very important decision, the true identity of Giannis is finally revealed, Lila, Genius and Markidis leave for a very exciting journey and Billy, Makis and Dimitris go to extremes to finally solve the mystery of the secret will. And a nun, a stripper and a relentless news anchor will rock the world of s1NgLEs. This last lot with destiny will be even more dangerous than the previous one. Because this game is played with two decks of cards...

=== Season 3 (2007–08) ===
- Air date: Wednesday at 11:00pm (episodes 50–58), Wednesday at 10:30pm (episodes 59–60)
- The episodes are divided into two parts and have a title for each part.

No. overall	No. in season	Title	Original air date	Viewership (average)	Rating
50	1	"Until Death Do Us ½ Each End And A New Beginning"	3 October 2007	19.2%	7.4
Rania tries to get back the custody of her son, but, did she marry the killer of the man of her life? Billy and Makis are determined to punish Angeliki and Markidis for the Dimitris' death, but do they find themselves guilty? The bank informs Katerina of a seizure decision but she loses it in a grassy place and Antigoni Mayhem arrives to spread confusion and panic. Things are getting darker in the world of s1NgLEs, but is every ending a new beginning?
51	2	"People Alone ½ Two And A Half"	10 October 2007	23.4%	7.6
Rania manages to see Lucas jr. but the meeting does not go as she expected, Katerina tries to find out what was on the bank paper, Giannis tries to convince Rania that he did not organize Lucas' murder, Billy confronts Dimitris' killer, Mayhem makes an invitation and, as things seem to be going from bad to worse, Lila decides to go against the script and leave the world of s1NgLEs for a city where people will not be alone. And as if that wasn't enough, 2½ new characters, a chauvinist marketing manager, an outcast street traveler and a very disobedient dog enter the world of s1NgLEs...
52	3	"Backspace ½ Crime On Mayhem Express"	24 October 2007	N/A	
Rania is haunted by insecurities about being a good mother and Fotis from the bank about the seizure. Maybe they can help each other. Lila is pursued by terrible misfortune, as she tries to leave the city with a Lilmobile that shows new problems and Tzaba that does not seem to help. Billy is pursued by Tanya who is determined to torture him as much as necessary to tell the whole truth about Dimitris' death. Lucas jr. is persecuted by Angelos for what happened to his mother, but it is time to find out what is hidden in his childish mind. And all the heroes board the Mayhem Express for a train trip. But not all passengers will get off at the last station...
53	4	"2×2 ½ The Butterfly Effect"	7 November 2007	N/A	
Take any two s1NgLEs and lock them in the same wagon. Mayhem shuffles her captives like playing cards hoping that this particular deck of characters will reveal to her not the future, but the past. Rania-Lila, Billy-Tsikalakis, Fotis-Angeliki Sereti and other mismatched twins locked in the same train compartment are forced to find themselves tête-à-tête and talk. What do they have to say to each other; Caught up in a bizarre game of karmic mystery, the heroes of the series blame each other for saving themselves. And they are forced to ask themselves: when a whole chain of random incidents has led to one death, who is really the killer?
54	5	"The Sign Of Cain: Let Us Go Into The Plain ½ The Sign Oof Cain: And After?"	14 November 2007	N/A	
The s1NgLEs trapped on a train locked in a death march. If they don't stop it, one of them will die. The last and most shocking chapter in the Mayhem Express saga finds Rania and Lila on the roof of the train threatened by Tanya, while Fotis, Katerina, Billy and Makis are forced to join forces with Markidis and Angeliki against the kidnappers. Will s1NgLEs manage to stop the train? Will Katerina and Fotis manage to pay the bank and save their house from foreclosure? Will Mayhem get the revenge she came for? Will she punish her son's murder with murder? This episode comes with answers to all these questions and an even more important one. Because it's time to find out if Giannis is behind Lucas' murder...
55	6	"The Gracious Kindness Of Strangers ½ The Hour Of Judgment (Part A)"	28 November 2007	N/A	
With the trial of Lucas' jr. custody injunction approaching headlong, Rania must decide to trust a witness to testify on her behalf in court and unfortunately can't be herself. Fotis and Katerina must decide whether to pursue their dreams for the career they dream of or settle for temporary jobs to overcome their financial difficulties. Giannis decides whether in court he will be on the side of Rania or his mother. Lila meets Elias and decides to postpone her trip for the Great Adventure of life, to do a little clubbing in the bars of the city. And Tzaba decides to leave the house, but he will learn that the world is not strewn with rose petals when you move around in a wheelchair. Doomsday begins and, by the end of its first part, some very important secrets will be revealed and one of the characters will leave the world of s1NgLEs...
56	7	"The Day Of Judgment (Part B) ½ Ιn Τhe Τrash"	12 December 2007	21.3%	7.4
The hour of judgment continues for s1NgLEs with the relationship of Rania and Lila being tested once again before Justice but also the relationship of Katerina and Fotis being tested before Mrs Chrisoula, Katerina's newly arrived mother from Thessaloniki, who dislikes Fotis at first sight. Will Rania and Lila manage to win the injunction and get Lucas jr. back; Will Fotis and Katerina manage to keep their relationship secret from her mom and get married in time to get the low interest mortgage, even though the Unionists of the municipality are on strike and the mayor has left for the dump?
57	8	"Power In Uniting ½ Chasing The Impossible"	19 December 2007	22.1%	7.7
Fotis and Katerina make repeated attempts to unite the company but no one comes to the dinners they organize, each for his own reasons. But when Lila uses her special gift to find out what the secret will says, it's time for the group to join forces and pursue the impossible: to attempt a second break-in at Angeliki's house. Determined this time to prepare better, they enroll in a kickboxing school, which of course they will completely upset. And can David defeat Goliath, or does this only happen in the Bible?
58	9	"The Art Of Failure ½ Turning The Game"	26 December 2007	18.8%	7.1
The people who after many failures get up and try again are visionaries or idiots; the break-in at Ageliki's house continues with the help of the children only that Fotis, Katerina and Makis are now prisoners in the hands of Markidis. Will Rania, Lila and Billy manage to save them and get their hands on the secret will or do the good guys win only in the movies? And while Angeliki's company is preparing to close a very important deal with American investors, a rich friend of Antigoni Mayhem comes to Greece trying to seduce Makis with her money, Tzaba dresses as a colonel and Rania and the company join forces for the final showdown with Angeliki. In all this panic, the company will be able to be reborn from its ashes and turn the game towards it?
59	10	"Give Me A Lever... ½ ...And Move The Earth"	23 January 2008	20.0%	8.9
What happens when two opposing forces try to move the world in opposite directions? Rania's confrontation with Angeliki Sereti culminates now that the two women live together in the same house and Rania's company has invaded the villa sowing panic. Lila sees her one-night stand with the Sereti family's lawyer getting bigger, Rania, to regain custody, must decide whether to deny that Lucas was the father of her child, and Oresteis returns from China with evidence that reveals the whole truth about the ships of Sereti's company. Together with Lila, Billy and Makis, they rediscover the end of the thread of Lucas' murder and follow her to the outside to discover his killer...
60	11	"Half Half ½ And Life Goes On..."	30 January 2008	20.2%	9.0
In the final episode of s1NgLEs 2½ and just before they become s1NgLES 3, the company swirls back into the cyclone of the Big Plan and no one knows where the end of this cycle will find him. Have Fotis and Katerina found their other half or must they continue searching? Will Lucas gr. and Angelos manage to make ends meet in a world full of dangers? Can Billy and Makis go as far as the murder to take revenge for Dimitris? Will Lila and Orestis manage to learn the whole truth about Lucas' death? Will Angeliki be punished for everything she has done or do the good guys win only in the movies? The only sure thing is that as in every last episode we will be concerned with a marriage, a flight and a death. And Rania finds out who her real other half is...

=== Season 4 (2007–08) ===
- Air date: Wednesday at 10:30pm

No. overall	No. in season	Title	Original air date	Viewership (average)	Ratiting
61	1	"1, 2, 3 Go!"	6 February 2008	21.3%	9.4
Three months have passed and we meet the s1NgLEs again in a new phase of their lives and ready to play their third game with Destiny. Rania returns to work but all the women seem to have been fired and James White has her desk put in the toilet while at the same time he is pressured by Lila to resume dating. Lila is in love with Nikos and believes that she has found the ideal man until her hands fall his wedding invitation. Fotis tries to convince Katerina to have children. And a wall painted in Lilac creates strange dreams for Billy and forces him to start psychoanalysis with completely unexpected results...
62	2	"Obstacle Course"	20 February 2008	17.1%	7.6
If life is a road with obstacles, it is worth leaving the starting point, when we are most likely to eat our faces? From her new office to the toilet, Rania tries to negotiate Middle East expansion with obstacles, a flush that keeps getting pulled and an overweight colleague with intestinal problems. Fotis finds a way to hit Katerina's biological clock but all he succeeds in is to hit her nerves. Tzaba wants to return to a wandering life but his doctor has a different opinion. Lila is determined to find a man to have a serious relationship with but instead of one, she meets two. And as if all this were not enough, a new intrapar love comes to upset the s1NgLEs and Tzaba acquires his first hobby...
63	3	"Does Not Third Fit In The Two?"	5 March 2008	12.9%	6.1
When there are two, the third is not long in coming. Are you trying to drive him away? Or should you just accept him? 1 Lila, 2 Michael, ...they had an affair. 3 Constantine reappears to claim her. 1 Katerina, 2 Fotis, ...they got married. 3 the child he tries to convince her to have and his first big love that comes and goes in their house. 1 Rania, 2 Makis, ...he is in love with her and determined to make a love confession to her, but all she wants is to have him spy on her obnoxious boss. 3 James White, the boss in question. 1 the bilis, 2 the women, ...by now he thought he liked them. 3 the case of liking men. Number 3 comes to challenge the s1NgLEs once again. There is room in their lives for the third factor?
64	4	"Mind Tests"	12 March 2008	16.9%	7.0
The brain is a dangerous game. Is it good to play with one's own or others, without having the instructions for use? It's time to take a journey into the mind of s1NgLEs. Two men are in Lila's, and she can't get either of them out. Katerina has the idea to build a garden for Fotis to deal with theirs instead of Ria's. Fotis gets nervous when he realizes that trying to beat Katerina's biological clock, he tampered with something in her brain. And the Rania – James confrontation takes on unexpected dimensions when he begins to play with Makis' mind...
65	5	"Til Five Is Bond"	19 March 2008	19.0%	7.8
Can one person satisfy all our needs? And if not, how many fit in our hearts? And most importantly, how many fit in our house? Eight spaces. Eleven people. Two rivals, not to be found in the same place. Some bags of incriminating evidence. police. A body. And Sarah and Mara just rang the bell. Throw all these ingredients in the same house, mix well, add some secrets that should not be revealed in any way, six characters who will do anything to protect them and one who does one stupidity after another. Will the s1NgLEs manage to avoid the evil encounter and conclude whether a man can make them happy? And all this in the same episode?
66	6	Let's Go Above?"	2 April 2008	N/A	
Life is like a road with cars. What is better? Staying where you are or hitchhiking and moving on? Lila pressures Rania to overcome Lucas and move on, while Fotis, faced with the possibility of never seeing Ria again, tries to clarify his feelings between her and Katerina. Tzaba does not succeed with the guitar and wants to try the next hobby but bilis asks him not to give up and "pay attention". Makis finds the ideal woman for bilis to advance his relationship with women, only she is plastic. Also, Lila makes a test to choose between Konstantinos and Michalis, Billy learns definitively whether he is gay or not, Rania and James exchange views on women and Tzaba receives a gift and some good news. The choices of the s1NgLEs pass before their eyes like cars on the path of Destiny, each with a different destination. Who will stay where they are and who will go next?
67	7	"Survivor"	9 April 2008	15.4%	7.1
If every man is an island, we are separated by a vast sea of solitude. Can we always cross it? And if so, can we always survive on the other's Islands? The name of the game in episode is "survival" and our players are: Katerina – Fotis: can true love survive in a world full of temptations? Rania: is there a love life after Lucas? Michalis – Konstantinos: which of the two will stay until the end on the island of Lila? Makis: will Makis manage to make an appointment with Rania with the help of James White? All this in an episode where Lila discovers that Fotis works in television, the males of the tribe try to impress Rania with a dance, a couple breaks up and one of the s1NgLEs leaves...
68	8	"There Is No Happiness Cut In Three"	23 April 2008	N/A	
Monogamy was invented to support the family. Now with our overpopulation is it still necessary or can we experience love in numbers greater than two? Lila and Rania start to take the car that Lila has left abandoned on the highway, only they decide to come with them and Konstantinos and Michalis who each believes for the other that he is Rania's boyfriend. The girls do everything they can to keep the two men from finding out the truth but when the car runs out of battery and Makis and James rush for help, Rania will find herself with half the basin and things will get even more entangled until the company ends up in the hospital and Lila is forced to make her choice...
69	9	"Love Hurts"	30 April 2008	N/A	
If love is such a beautiful thing, why do so many songs associate it with pain? And if love is a deeply sadomasochistic habit, why do we continue to fall in love? Makis betrayed by Rania's kiss with James, reacts very badly and their confrontation peaks while Rania will have to choose if one of the two would be interested in something more stable. Lila, Konstantinos and Michalis try to have a serious relationship but when the men make a party against her, Lila realizes that the relationship between three people has more problems than the obvious ones. And when Makis and Billy are trapped in a "nightmarish" den with a frightening name, the girls must take action to save them. S1NgLEs play games of love and power in an episode that penetrates deep into the sadomasochistic nature of love and manages to make revelations that will fascinate...
70	10	"Party"	7 May 2008	19.9%	8.4
If life is a party, can you always choose which people come to yours? Or should you just welcome those who show up? Under pressure from the children and Lila, Rania agrees to go to Italy to reunite the family, which includes Lucas' new wife and daughter. Rania just wants to "take out" the weekend but Lila believes that Lucas is the man of her life and she has a right to fight him again. Back in Athens, Katerina and Billy throw a party at Rania's house to invite Eleni and for Billy to get to know her more. But all the rest of the town appears at the party except Eleni, and Billy and Katerina fight to save the house from the hordes of barbarians who showed up at their party...
71	11	"New Beginnings"	21 May 2008	N/A	
If life is like a backgammon game, what happens when Destiny hits your checker and sends it back to the starting point? Do you always have the strength to start all over again? Rania picks up the pieces after her trip to Italy and understands that it's time to make a decision about whether to continue her relationship with James. Agapi enlists Lila's help in deciding whether she should return to her relationship with Nikos. Billy tries to make a new start in his love life with Eleni but she sees him amicably. S1NgLEs are faced with new beginnings and must decide whether to stay where they are or move on, in an episode that suggests "10 ways to get over a breakup"...
72	12	"The Force Of Custom"	4 June 2008	18.8%	7.9
73	13	"The Battle Of The Sexes"	4 June 2008	18.8%	7.9
Even if you want to change for the better, you can always go against the force of habit? The ban on smoking in the company, the withdrawal syndrome of Rania and the decision of Lila to quit, hit the nerves of the two friends and so sharpen their quarrels that Katerina and Billy give them a conflict resolution program in a psychiatric clinic. There they are taken over by Pantelis but will he be able to cure them or will they drive him crazy? At the same time Katerina arranges for her parents a romantic dinner for the anniversary of 30 years of marriage, in the hope that they will get back together. But everything seems to go wrong, especially when her father's mistress appears on the anniversary. Katerina will be able to reunite her parents, keep secret yoga classes and at the same time rebuild her relationship with her mother? All this in an episode where Rania and Lila wonder about their future and imagine what it will be like in 2047, the girls go jogging and Agapi meets handsome with the dog and Tzaba falls in love. But should he change to like the woman who won his heart? Men and women. Are species compatible or should we each find our own planet to inhabit? And which ultimately is the upper sex? Men and women. Are species compatible or do we each have to find our own planet to inhabit? And which is the upper sex? White's new measures cause panic in the company and the Rania-James war escalates. But when Lila loses her entry card and James forces her to stay out of the company by losing days off, ND becomes a real battleground. Rania, Lila and Thalia join forces and decide to solve the mystery behind James White. Agapi starts dating handsome with the dog while Tzaba gives it all to the hunt for the woman of his dreams. And in a fantastic game show entitled "The Battle Of The Sexes" and hosted by Nikos Moutsinas, the women and men of the series cross their swords to prove which gender has the most flaws...
74	14	"Life Has Two Doors"	11 June 2008	21.4%	8.2
75	15	"Pull A Card..."	11 June 2008	21.4%	8.2
It's time for S1NgLEs characters to make their choices. Lila falls in love with Themis and has to choose between him and her love for the theater. Lucas has to choose between his family and Rania. Agapi has to choose between Andreas and Tzaba. And Rania has to choose between her Marketing Management and her friendship with Lila... S1NgLes play their last game with Destiny. The cards are dealt by the free man and the game is simple: find the priest. But if happiness is in King Kardia, why do s1NgLEs keep pulling ace basouni? And if the game is rigged, can we really win it? Rania and Lucas make the final decision on whether to be together, Themis proposes to Lila, Katerina learns if she is made for a career, Tzaba reveals why he quarreled with the money and the company goes to a shoot of s1NgLEs. Oh, and Rania and Lila are wearing wedding dresses. But only one s1NgLe will go up the steps of the church. The s1NgLes are chasing love one last time. Who will end up a couple and who will stay with Ace Basuni? And it is certain that happiness lies in the King Of Hearts or we can be happy, even if we do not find him?
