= Small Crime =

- Directed by: Christos Georgiou
- Written by: Christos Georgiou
- Produced by: Thanassis Karathanos; Christos Georgiou
- Starring: Aris Servetalis; Vicky Papadopoulou
- Cinematography: Giorgos Giannelis
- Edited by: Isabel Meier
- Music by: Thanasis Papakonstantinou; Kostantis Papakonstantinou
- Production companies: Twenty Twenty Vision; Lychnari Productions; Bad Movies
- Distributed by: Audio Visual (Germany); Neue Visionen (Greece)
- Release dates: 17 November 2008 (Thessaloniki International Film Festival); 2 April 2009 (Greece)
- Running time: 84 minutes
- Countries: Greece; Germany; Cyprus
- Language: Greek

Small Crime (Greek: Μικρό έγκλημα) is a 2008 Greek-German-Cypriot romantic crime comedy-drama film directed by Christos Georgiou, starring Aris Servetalis and Vicky Papadopoulou.

== Plot ==
Leonidas, a young and ambitious police officer recently graduated from the academy, is assigned to the remote Aegean island of Thirassia. Disappointed by the lack of criminal activity, he spends his days performing mundane tasks such as issuing minor traffic tickets and monitoring nude bathers. His primary connection to the outside world is a morning television show hosted by Angeliki, an island native who moved to the city to become a celebrity.

The island's tranquility is disturbed when the body of Zacharias, the local drunk, is discovered at the base of a cliff. Although the local doctor and the police chief dismiss the death as a routine accident caused by Zacharias's intoxication, Leonidas suspects foul play. Driven by a desire for professional validation, he launches an unofficial murder investigation.

During his inquiry, Angeliki returns to the island to settle the affairs of the deceased, who is revealed to be her father. Leonidas and Angeliki form a romantic bond as he interviews the island's eccentric residents. His investigation reveals that several villagers harbor minor secrets and played tangential, unintentional roles in the events leading up to the fall.

Leonidas eventually discovers that there was no singular murderer; instead, Zacharias's death was the result of a chain of "small crimes" and negligences committed by various community members. Realizing the nuanced nature of life and justice on the island, Leonidas abandons his ambitions for a high-profile city career. He chooses to remain on Thirassia, integrating into the community and pursuing his relationship with Angeliki.

== Cast ==
- Aris Servetalis as Leonidas
- Vicky Papadopoulou as Aggeliki
- Rania Oikonomidou as Anastasia Pleiades
- Antonis Katsaris as Zacharias
- Errikos Litsis as Iordanis
- Evangelia Andreadaki as Victoria
- Eleni Kokkidou as Antigone
- Arto Apartian as Panagiotis
- Myzafer Zifla as Mouzafer

== Reception ==
Alissa Simon of Variety wrote that the film "humorously captures the mentality of a small island community."

Yolande Cole of The Georgia Straight wrote that Georgiou "draws memorable performances from both Servetalis and Papadopoulou, succeeding in producing a unique and charming comedy, set against the backdrop of a spectacular location."
