= Efthimis Filippou =

Greek screenwriter

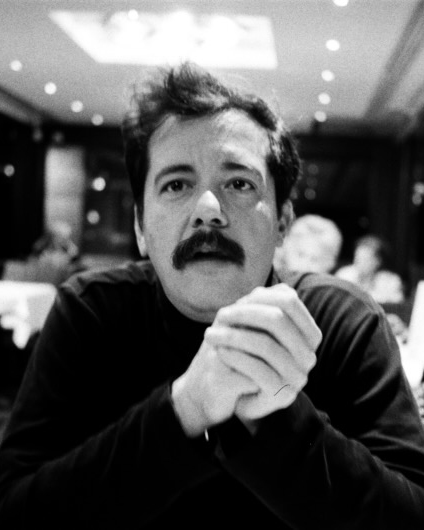
- Filippou in 2026
- Born: Efthymis Filippou; 18 January 1977 (age 49); Athens, Greece
- Occupations: Screenwriter, playwright, copywriter
- Years active: 2001–present

Efthimis Filippou (Greek: Ευθύμης Φιλίππου, pronounced [efˈθimis fiˈlipu]; born 18 January 1977), sometimes credited as Efthymis Filippou, is a Greek writer, whose work includes books, plays and screenplays. He is best known for his collaboration with director Yorgos Lanthimos, with whom he co-wrote the screenplays for Dogtooth (2009), Alps (2011), The Lobster (2015), The Killing of a Sacred Deer (2017) and Kinds of Kindness (2024).

He was the winner of the Golden Osella Award for Best Screenplay at the 68th Venice International Film Festival in 2011, which he shared with Yorgos Lanthimos. In 2016, he received an invitation from the Academy of Motion Picture Arts and Sciences to become a member.

At the 89th Academy Awards, he was nominated for Best Original Screenplay for his work on The Lobster, with Yorgos Lanthimos.

== Filmography ==
Year	Title	Notes	Awards
2009	Dogtooth	Co-writer	Hellenic Film Academy Award for Best Screenplay
2011	Alps	Co-writer	Venice Film Festival - Golden Osella
2012	L	Co-writer	
2015	The Lobster	Co-writer	Cannes Film Festival – Jury Prize; European Film Award for Best Screenwriter; Los Angeles Film Critics Association Award for Best Screenplay; Online Film Critics Society Award for Best Non-U.S. Films; Nominated—Academy Award for Best Original Screenplay; Nominated—BAFTA Award for Outstanding British Film; Nominated—Belgian Film Critics Association – Grand Prix; Nominated—BIFA for Best British Independent Film; Nominated—BIFA for Best Screenplay; Nominated—European Film Award for Best Film; Nominated—Evening Standard British Film Award for Best Film; Nominated—London Film Critics' Circle Award for British / Irish Film of the Year; Nominated—Online Film Critics Society Award for Best Original Screenplay; Nominated—Satellite Award for Best Original Screenplay
2015	Chevalier	Co-writer	Hellenic Film Academy Award for Best Screenplay
2017	The Killing of a Sacred Deer	Co-writer	Cannes Film Festival – Best Screenplay Award
2018	Pity	Co-writer	
2024	Kinds of Kindness	Co-writer	
2026	Rosebush Pruning	Writer	

== See also ==
- List of Greek Academy Award winners and nominees
