= She Loved Blossoms More =

2024 surrealist science-fiction film

- Film poster
- Greek: Αγαπούσε τα λουλούδια περισσότερο
- Directed by: Yannis Veslemes
- Written by: Yannis Veslemes; Dimitris Emmanouilidis
- Starring: Panos Papadopoulos; Julio Katsis; Sandra Abuelghanam
- Edited by: Yorgos Mavropsaridis
- Distributed by: Dark Sky Films
- Release date: 10 June 2024 (Tribeca Festival)
- Running time: 88 minutes
- Countries: Greece; France
- Languages: Greek; French

She Loved Blossoms More (Greek: Αγαπούσε τα λουλούδια περισσότερο, romanized: Agapouse ta louloudia perissotero) is a 2024 surrealist science-fiction film directed by Yannis Veslemes.

== Premise ==
Three brothers named Hedgehog, Dummy, and Japan attempt to turn their mother's art deco wardrobe into a machine that will bring her back from the dead.

== Cast ==
- Panos Papadopoulos as Hedgehog
- Julio Katsis as Dummy
- Sandra Abuelghanam as Samantha
- Dominique Pinon as Logo
- Aris Balis as Japan
- Alexia Kaltsiki as Margarita

== Release ==
She Loved Blossoms More premiered in the United States at the Tribeca Festival on June 10, 2024.

=== Critical reception ===
On the review aggregator website Rotten Tomatoes, 90% of 21 critics' reviews are positive.

Alexandra Heller-Nicholas of the Alliance of Women Film Journalists called the film "an all-too-rare treasure, a sumptuous beast that both dazzles the eye and joyfully, playfully and willfully befuddles the brain." Alan Ng of Film Threat called the film's production design "strangely beautiful", concluding that "Yannis Veslemes tells a story that is both grotesque and tender, capturing how love and grief can twist our own realities." Amber Wilkinson of Screen International called the film a "delirious mix that features baroque body horror", and said that "for those who favour visceral visuals over strong storytelling, it's a stylish treat."
