= Aris Servetalis =

Greek film and television actor

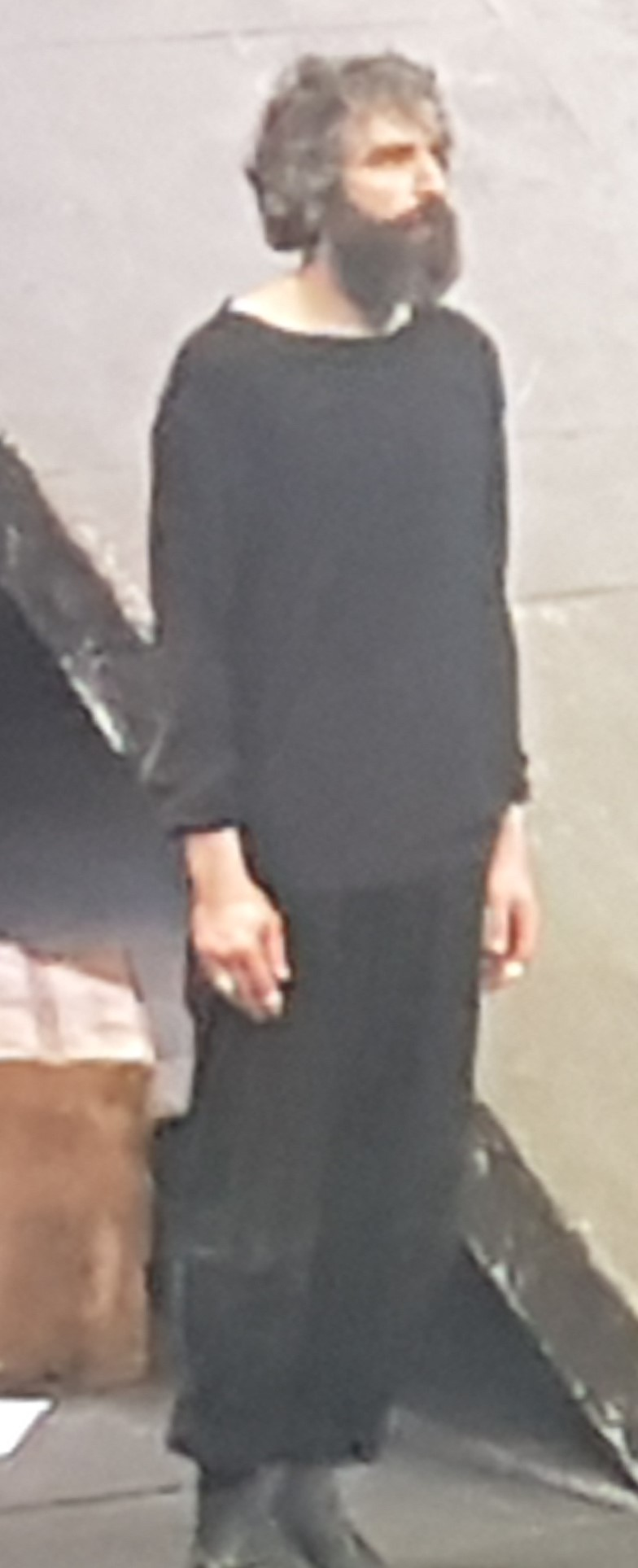
- Born: 21 December 1976 (age 49); Koukaki, Athens, Greece
- Occupation: Actor
- Years active: 2001–present

Aris Servetalis (Greek: Άρης Σερβετάλης) is a Greek actor.

== Life and career ==
He was nominated for the Hellenic Film Academy Award for Best Leading Actor for the film L. He has won one television award for the television series Eisai to Tairi mou.

== Filmography ==
Year	Title	Character	Notes
2021	Man of God	Nectarios of Aegina	
2020	Apples		
2018	The Waiter	Renos	
2012	Arundel		Short film
2012	L	Man	
2011	Alps	Ambulance man	
2008	Small Crime	Leonidas	
2007	S1ngles	Fotis Lagoudakis	TV series
2008	DownLove		Short film
2008	She eida...	Leonidas	TV series
2006	Open Season	Boog	Voice, Greek dub
2006	Asterix and the Vikings	Justforkix	Voice, Greek dub
2005	Kinetta		
2005	A Dog's Dream		
2004	7 Deadly Mothers in-law	Miltos	TV series
2003	Kleise ta matia	Stefanos	TV series
2002	Let's Go for an Ouzo		
2001	You are my other half	Lazarus	TV series
