= The Killing of a Sacred Deer =

2017 film by Yorgos Lanthimos

- Theatrical release poster
- Directed by: Yorgos Lanthimos
- Written by: Efthimis Filippou; Yorgos Lanthimos
- Produced by: Ed Guiney; Yorgos Lanthimos
- Starring: Colin Farrell; Nicole Kidman; Barry Keoghan; Raffey Cassidy; Sunny Suljic; Alicia Silverstone; Bill Camp
- Cinematography: Thimios Bakatakis
- Edited by: Yorgos Mavropsaridis
- Production companies: Element Pictures; Film4; New Sparta Films; Limp; HanWay Films; Bord Scannán na hÉireann / the Irish Film Board
- Distributed by: Curzon Film
- Release dates: 22 May 2017 (Cannes); 3 November 2017 (Ireland and United Kingdom)
- Running time: 121 minutes
- Countries: Ireland; United Kingdom
- Language: English
- Box office: $10.7 million

The Killing of a Sacred Deer is a 2017 absurdist psychological horror thriller film directed and co-produced by Yorgos Lanthimos, who also co-wrote the screenplay with Efthimis Filippou. It stars Colin Farrell, Nicole Kidman, Barry Keoghan, Raffey Cassidy, Sunny Suljic, Alicia Silverstone, and Bill Camp. It follows a cardiac surgeon who introduces his family to a teenage boy with a connection to his past, after which they mysteriously begin to fall ill.

The film had its world premiere at the 70th Cannes Film Festival on 22 May 2017, where it was awarded Best Screenplay. It was theatrically released in Ireland and the United Kingdom on 3 November 2017, by Curzon. It grossed $10.7 million worldwide and received positive reviews from critics, who praised Lanthimos' direction, the screenplay, cinematography, and performances of the cast (particularly those of Keoghan, Farrell, and Kidman). At the 15th Irish Film & Television Awards, the film earned four nominations, with Keoghan winning Best Supporting Actor. It was nominated for Best Director, Best Screenwriter, and Best Actor (Farrell) at the 30th European Film Awards, and for Best Supporting Male (Keoghan) and Best Cinematography at the 33rd Independent Spirit Awards.

== Plot ==
After performing an open heart surgery, Steven Murphy, a cardiothoracic surgeon in Cincinnati, goes to a diner where he meets 16-year-old Martin Lang, whose father died a few years earlier. Steven invites Martin to meet his family: his wife Anna, their daughter Kim, and their son Bob. Martin makes a good impression on everyone, but seems to especially get along with Kim.

The following night, Steven goes to Martin's house for dinner at Martin's request. After Martin goes to bed, Martin's mother initiates sex with Steven; when he rejects her, she tells him that it is Martin's wish for them to have sex, after which Steven angrily leaves.

Martin visits Steven's office, complaining of chest pain. Steven runs tests on Martin, all of which produce normal results. Martin invites Steven over again, but Steven declines. Martin's demands for Steven's attention grow increasingly frequent and desperate, and Steven becomes gradually more frustrated and concerned, especially when he learns that Martin gave Kim a ride home on his motorcycle.

One morning, Bob finds himself unable to move his legs. Steven and Anna rush him to the hospital, where numerous tests are performed. Martin then reveals that his father died while Steven was operating on him. Martin blames Steven for his death and believes that to make things even, Steven must kill a member of his own family; if Steven refuses, all four will eventually die within a few days, beginning with paralysis, an inability to eat, and finally bleeding from the eyes. Steven has Martin ejected from the hospital. Later, Bob begins inexplicably refusing to eat, even when Steven begins furiously forcing him to.

Kim, who has fallen in love with Martin, collapses while singing in her school's choir and is also hospitalized. When she also starts rejecting food, she and Bob are both given feeding tubes. Steven finally confides in Anna about his history with Martin, eventually admitting that he had consumed alcohol before performing Martin's father's surgery. Martin phones Kim, instructing her to stand up and walk. She complies, only to become paralyzed again when he hangs up. Anna, witnessing this, confronts Martin and proclaims that he has no right to force her children to suffer. Martin asserts that this is merely justice for his father.

Kim and Bob are discharged. After Anna chastises Steven for his passive attitude toward their situation, Steven ties Martin up in their basement, beats him, and shoots his legs. Unintimidated, Martin bites Steven's arm, before biting his own arm as an example of retributive justice. Kim and Bob argue over which one of them Steven will kill, and each try to respectively curry his favor. Steven asks their school principal which of the two is better, though the principal cannot provide an answer.

Back home, Anna takes the children to see Martin, where she tends to his wounds and kisses his feet, ultimately failing to elicit any sympathy from him. She encourages Steven to kill one of the children rather than her, as they can have another child. Kim implores Martin to heal her so they can run away together; when this fails, she tells Steven how much she loves her family and offers her life to spare theirs. Hopeless, Anna finally releases Martin.

When Bob begins bleeding from his eyes, Steven places him, Kim, and Anna in a circle, bound with duct tape, and covers their heads. Steven pulls a wool hat over his own face and repeatedly fires a rifle while spinning in a circle. He narrowly misses Kim and Anna, but the third shot kills Bob.

Some time later, Martin enters the diner where he and Steven used to meet, where the remaining Murphys are. The three promptly leave, with Anna and Kim glaring at Martin, while Steven avoids his gaze.

== Cast ==
- Colin Farrell as Steven Murphy
- Nicole Kidman as Anna Murphy
- Barry Keoghan as Martin Lang
- Raffey Cassidy as Kimberly "Kim" Murphy
- Sunny Suljic as Robert "Bob" Murphy
- Alicia Silverstone as Martin's Mother
- Bill Camp as Matthew Williams
- Barry Bernson as Dr. Larry Banks
- Herb Caillouet as Ed Thompson (Hospital Director)
- Denise Dal Vera as Mary Williams
- Drew Logan as Principal
- Michael Trester as Elderly Man
- Ming Wang as Doctor (Abdominal)

== Production ==
The Killing of a Sacred Deer takes its title from part of the story of the ancient Greek tragedy Iphigenia in Aulis by Euripides. On 11 May 2016, it was announced that Farrell was set to star in the film, with Lanthimos directing from a screenplay he wrote alongside Filippou. This was the second collaboration between Lanthimos and Farrell, after 2015's The Lobster. Kidman was cast that June, and Silverstone, Cassidy, Camp, Keoghan, and Suljic joined the project in August. The film was financed by Film4 and New Sparta Films along with the Irish Film Board, and was developed by Element Pictures with support from Film4, while HanWay Films served as worldwide sales agent.

By 23 August 2016, the film had begun principal photography at The Christ Hospital in Cincinnati. Shooting also took place in the Hyde Park and Northside neighborhoods of the city.

== Release ==
The Killing of a Sacred Deer premiered at the 70th Cannes Film Festival on 22 May 2017, where it competed for the Palme d'Or and won Best Screenplay. In May 2016, A24 acquired North American distribution rights, and Haut et Court acquired French distribution rights to the film. It was theatrically released in the United States on 20 October 2017, and in Ireland and the United Kingdom on 3 November 2017.

== Reception ==
=== Box office ===
In North America, The Killing of a Sacred Deer made $114,585 from four theaters in its opening weekend, an average of $28,646 per venue. It opened to £288,105 and finished on £857,615 in the United Kingdom. The film ultimately grossed $2.3 million in the United States and Canada, and $8.4 million in other territories, for a worldwide total of $10.7 million.

=== Critical response ===
On the review aggregator website Rotten Tomatoes, 79% of 281 critics' reviews are positive, with an average rating of 7.7/10. The website's consensus reads: "The Killing of a Sacred Deer continues director Yorgos Lanthimos' stubbornly idiosyncratic streak—and demonstrates again that his is a talent not to be ignored." Metacritic, which uses a weighted average, assigned the film a score of 73 out of 100, based on 45 critics, indicating "generally favorable" reviews.

Peter Bradshaw of The Guardian gave the film 4 out of 5 stars, writing that "The Killing of a Sacred Deer moves with a somnambulist's certainty along its own distinctive spectrum of weird. It's an intriguing, disturbing, amusing twist on something which in many ways could be a conventional horror-thriller from the 1970s or 1980s, or even a bunny-boiler nightmare from the 90s." Mark Kermode of The Observer also gave the film 4 out of 5 stars, describing it as "a typically arch dramatic conundrum, laced with Lanthimos's trademark off-kilter artifice and deadpan humour" and "a Saw movie for the arthouse crowd, an increasingly sickening hunger game driven by an inflexible moral imperative, with a whiff of medical misadventure."

A. O. Scott of The New York Times opined that "Lanthimos is less interested in moral shock therapy or social criticism than in aesthetic estrangement. Sacred Deer feels like a dark, opaque bit of folklore transplanted into an off-kilter modern setting." Justin Chang of the Los Angeles Times called the film "a lightly blood-spattered but technically immaculate nightmare of a movie that invites us to cackle alongside its director into the void" and commented, "With a nastiness that seeps into the movie like a slow-acting poison, [Lanthimos] turns a domestic-medical nightmare into a feverish exercise in style."

The Killing of a Sacred Deer was named "one of the best horror movies of the year" by Joey Keogh of Wicked Horror, who called it "horror in its purest, most distilled form, freed from the shackles of jump scares or exposition." Keogh wrote that Keoghan is the film's "ace card", giving "his best, most self-assured performance to date" as Martin, the "supremely frightening yet weirdly charismatic creation who makes even the act of eating spaghetti seem terrifying." Zhuo-Ning Su of Awards Daily wrote that the film is "less complex than [Lanthimos's] previous work but engrosses and unsettles all the same", adding that it "palpably improves" in its second hour. While praising the cast, particularly Kidman, Su added that Keoghan "shines brightest as the plain but charismatic boy who's somehow not quite right", calling his performance "vivid" and "fully realised".

In a mixed review, Nicholas Bell of ION Cinema wrote that the "mysterious, highly metaphorical" film, which he compared to "something from the Old Testament", "finds the director getting a bit too hung up on his own idiosyncrasies." He also criticized Lanthimos's and Filippou's "overtly precise dialogue", which he felt "straitjacketed" the actors, but he praised director of photography Thimios Bakatakis and the "eerie" score. Bell summarized the film as "interesting, but a bit too ambiguous to remain as uncomfortably off-putting as it hopes".

Trace Thurman gave the film a five-star review in Bloody Disgusting, saying it would be "the most unsettling film you see this year" and giving particular credit to Lanthimos's direction and Bakatakis's cinematography, which he said give the film a "surreal, otherworldly quality". Thurman also praised the cast, writing that Farrell and Kidman "deliver their lines with a stilted coldness that sends chills up the spine", and calling the younger actors "equally impressive, with Keoghan being the standout. He gives an eerie performance that you believe to be that of a psychopath". Also writing for Bloody Disgusting, Benedict Seal gave the film a one-star review, stating that it had "none of the escalating intrigue and tension" of The Gift and The Witch, both released in 2015. Seal added that the film plays out "mechanically" after the reveal in the middle and said the visuals were "striking at times" but became "monotonous and garish", before summing up the film as "the biggest bum note yet from one of the most overrated directors in the art-house world" and "an epic embarrassment".

=== Accolades ===
Accolades for The Killing of a Sacred Deer
Award	Date of ceremony	Category	Recipient(s)	Result	Ref.
AACTA International Awards	6 January 2018	Best Supporting Actress	Nicole Kidman	Nominated	
Cannes Film Festival	26 May 2017	Palme D'Or	Yorgos Lanthimos	Nominated	
Cannes Film Festival	26 May 2017	Best Screenplay Award	Yorgos Lanthimos and Efthimis Filippou	Won	
European Film Awards	10 December 2017	Best European Actor	Colin Farrell	Nominated	
European Film Awards	10 December 2017	Best European Director	Yorgos Lanthimos	Nominated	
European Film Awards	10 December 2017	Best European Screenwriter	Yorgos Lanthimos and Efthimis Filippou	Nominated	
Evening Standard British Film Awards	8 February 2018	Best Supporting Actor	Barry Keoghan	Nominated	
Filmfest Hamburg	14 October 2017	Sichtwechsel Film Award	Yorgos Lanthimos	Nominated	
Florida Film Critics Circle	23 December 2017	Best Supporting Actor	Barry Keoghan	Nominated	
Ghent International Film Festival	20 October 2017	Grand Prix – Best Film	Yorgos Lanthimos	Nominated	
Independent Spirit Awards	3 March 2018	Best Supporting Male	Barry Keoghan	Nominated	
Independent Spirit Awards	3 March 2018	Best Cinematography	Thimios Bakatakis	Nominated	
London Film Critics Circle	January 28, 2018	British/Irish Actor of the Year	Colin Farrell (also for The Beguiled)	Nominated	
Seattle Film Critics Society	18 December 2017	Best Supporting Actor	Barry Keoghan	Nominated	
Seattle Film Critics Society	18 December 2017	Villain of the Year	Barry Keoghan (as Martin)	Nominated	
Sitges Film Festival	14 October 2017	Best Film	The Killing of a Sacred Deer	Nominated	
Sitges Film Festival	14 October 2017	José Luis Guarner Critics' Award	The Killing of a Sacred Deer	Won	
