= L (film) =

2011 Greek comedy-drama film

- Directed by: Babis Makridis
- Screenplay by: Babis Makridis; Efthymis Filippou
- Story by: Yorgos Giokas
- Produced by: Amanda Livanou; Babis Makridis
- Starring: Aris Servetalis
- Cinematography: Thimios Bakatakis
- Edited by: Yannis Chalkiadakis
- Music by: Coti K
- Production companies: Beben Films; Warp Films; Faliro House Productions
- Distributed by: Feelgood Entertainment
- Release date: 23 February 2012
- Running time: 87 minutes
- Country: Greece
- Language: Greek

L (Learning) is a 2011 Greek comedy-drama film directed by Babis Makridis in his debut, and written by Makridis and Efthymis Filippou, based on an original idea by Yorgos Giokas. It stars Aris Servetalis as a 40 year old man whose life rapidly changes over the course of a single day.

Makridis had previously produced a short film, The Last Fakir (2005), which received the Newcomer's Prize at the 2005 International Short Film Festival in Drama. L, his first feature film, was the first Greek selection to compete at the 2012 Sundance Film Festival (19–29 January 2012) where its international premiere took place. It was also nominated to compete in the official Tiger Awards competition in the International Film Festival Rotterdam (25 January – 5 February 2012). The film was nominated for Best Script award at the Hellenic Film Academy Awards. A six-minute extract was first released at the Work Progress Section of the Karlovy Vary International Film Festival, at the Czech Republic in July 2011.

== Plot ==
A Man lives in his car. He is 40 years old and although he does not have a lot of free time, when he does, he chooses to spend it with his family. He meets his wife and two children at a specified day and time in car parking lots. His job is to locate and bring the finest honey to a 50-year-old man. A New Driver shows up and the Man gets fired. The Man's life changes and he finds it absurd that no one trusts him anymore.

== Cast ==
- Aris Servetalis as the Man
- Makis Papadimitriou as the Black Rider
- Yannis Bostantzoglou as the Boss
- Eleftherios Matthaios as The Bear
- Nota Tserniafski as the Wife
- Stavros Raptis as the Friend
- Thanassis Dimou as the New Driver
- Christoforos Skamnakis as the Yachtsman
- Pavlos Makridis as the Son
- Natalia Tserniafski as the Daughter
- Alexis Kanakis as Motorbiker
- Antonis Iliakis as Meteor

== Production ==
=== Filming ===
Filming took place during March and April 2011 in outdoor locations in Attica, Greece and additional filming took place at the end of July 2011. Filming was concluded within 27 days.

=== Technical information ===
The movie was filmed in 35mm with an Arriflex BL camera, is 87 minutes long, in colour, sound Dolby SRD, language Greek with English subtitles, 1:85:1 format, edited in Avid.

=== Production credentials ===
- Directed, by Babis Makridis
- Script, Efthymis Filippou Babis Makridis, based on an original idea by Yorgos Giokas about a man who lives in his car
- Location Manager, Dimitris Chalkiadakis
- Line Producer, Yorgos Papadimitriou
- Sets, Dafni Kalogianni
- Costumes, Dimitris Papathomas
- Sound, Stefanos Efthimiou
- Mixing/Sound Design, Costas Fylaktidis
- Music, Coti K
- Editor, Yannis Chalkiadakis
- Director of Photography, Thimios Bakatakis
- Executive Producer, Peter Carlton, Christos V. Konstantakopoulos
- Production, Beben Films (Amanda Livanou, Babis Makridis)
- Co Production, NOVA, Feelgood Entertainment, Faliro House Productions, Top Cut, Modiano S.A., Dennis Iliadis, Efthymis Filippou, Yannis Chalkiadakis, Thimios Bakatakis, Yorgos Papadimitriou, Dimitris Papathomas, in association with Warp Films and the support of the Greek Film Center.

== Release and distribution ==
The movie was released in Greek movie theaters in February 2012 by Feelgood Entertainment movie distribution company.

== Festivals ==
- Sundance Film Festival. Official selection world drama competition.
- Rotterdam Film Festival. IFFR's Tiger Awards Competition.
- Copenhagen International Film Festival. Official competition for New talent grand pix
- Indielisboa. Official Competition.
- Seattle International Film Festival. New Directors Competition.
- Melbourne International Film Festival. Competition Telescope Section.
- Mumbai Film Festival. International Competition.
- 42 Molodist. Kyiv Film Festival. International Competition. WINNER THE GRAND PRIX OF MOLODIST
- Arizona Underground Film Festival. International Competition.
- Festival International du Film Indépendant de Bordeaux. International Competition.
- 36o São Paulo International Film Festival. New Directors Competition.
- Shadowline Salerno. Official Competition.
- Sydney Film Festival. Section Push Me to the Edge
- D' A Festival Internacional de cinema d'author de Barcelona.
- International Istanbul Film Festival
- Karlovy Vary. Section Another View.
- Stockholm International Film Festival. Section Twilight Zone.
- 19th Greek Film Festival 2012 (Melbourne).
- Eurasia Film Festival. Section Cinema bridge: East
- 23 Ljubljana Film Festival. Section Panorama
- Sevilla Festival de Cine Europeo. Section: Focus Europa : Greece.
- 27º Festival international de cine de mar del plata
- 18ο Vilnius International Film Festival, Lithuania. Discoveries program

== Words about L ==
- FILM DE CULTE
- FLIX
- FLIX GR
- CUEDOTCOMFESSIONS
- THE LIMERICK REVIEW
- QUIET EARTH
- ALTERNATIVE CHRONICLE
- SUNDANCE FILM FESTIVAL
- SBS.COM.AUSTRALIA
- HOLLYWOOD REPORTER
