= Thimios Bakatakis =

Greek cinematographer

Thimios Bakatakis (Greek: Θύμιος Μπακατάκης; born 1970) is a Greek cinematographer. He has served as a cinematographer for various feature films, short films, music videos, and commercials, often collaborating with director Yorgos Lanthimos on his projects.

== Early life ==
Bakatakis was born in Athens, Greece in 1970, and attended Hellenic Cinema and Television School Stavrakos in the same city. He met director Yorgos Lanthimos while attending Stavrakos, whom he befriended and would later regularly collaborate with after their graduations.

== Career ==
=== First features and collaborations (2004–2012) ===
After graduating, he shot his first feature film, the Dennis Iliadis-directed Hardcore (2004). His work was praised by Derek Elley of Variety, who praised its enhancement of the film's production design, calling Bakatakis' cinematography "saturated" and "neon-flavored". This was followed by his first feature collaboration with Lanthimos on the 2005 film Kinetta, where Bakatakis utilized hand-held cinematography during shooting, saying that "the camera had a role in the film". Their next collaboration was on the 2009 film Dogtooth, where Bakatakis instead decided to film the actors primarily with close-ups, embracing more "static and formal" camerawork. Dogtooth was met with critical acclaim, winning the Un Certain Regard award at the 2009 Cannes Film Festival. Film critic Roger Ebert praised Bakatakis' cinematography for resembling "a series of family photographs of a family with something wrong with it".

In 2010, Bakatakis lensed Athina Rachel Tsangari's directorial debut Attenberg. Tsangari had served as a producer on Kinetta and an associate producer on Dogtooth, and the film also features Lanthimos in an acting role. Film critic Peter Bradshaw noted "striking" similarities between Bakatakis' work in Dogtooth and Attenberg, saying that "their demystified, almost countererotic nudity and sex scenes" were notable identifiers. A. O. Scott of The New York Times shared Bradshaw's opinion, citing that both Tsangari and Lanthimos utilize an "unblinking shooting style, with wide shots, minimal camera movements and off-kilter compositions that combine to create a dreamy, anxious mood". Scott also noted Bakatakis' "beguiling blend of detachment and empathy — the camera sometimes lurking like a spy, sometimes trailing along like a shy, devoted friend". The following year, Bakatakis served as director of photography for the drama film Porfirio, directed by Alejandro Landes. The film premiered at the 2011 Cannes Film Festival. Jeannette Castoulis of The New York Times echoed Scott in her review of the film, noting Porfirio's "fixed camera" that "stares unblinkingly". Reviews in Slant Magazine and Film Journal International also shared this opinion, with Film Journal International's writer praising Bakataki for "film[ing] most scenes in medium or distant static shots (a common technique in recent art films), keeping us from any excessive or maudlin sympathy for Porfirio".

=== Breakthrough (2012–present) ===
Bakatakis again employed his fixed-camera approach to cinematography in L, the 2012 directorial debut of Babis Makridis, which premiered at the 2012 Sundance Film Festival. Also in 2012, he shot the drama film Keep the Lights On, directed by Ira Sachs. Sachs praised Bakatakis for "[shooting] sex better than anyone else working today...For Thimios, sex is just a part of life. The camera doesn't have to shoot it any different than a dinner scene or a birthday party." Eric Kohn of IndieWire praised the film's "visual polish", noting Bakatakis' "warm palette that's particularly evocative during the bedroom scenes, when deep yellows appear to manifest the characters’ state of mind." Film critic Justin Chang similarly praised the use of colour, saying that "bathing the men's bodies in a golden, soft-edged light warmly captured by Thimios Bakatakis' Super 16 photography, [Sachs] folds his characters in what feels like a tenderly protective embrace". Two years later, he served as cinematographer for the Eskil Vogt-directed Blind. Scott Foundas of Variety praised Bakatakis, amongst other crew members, for their "invaluable contributions", calling Bakatakis a "great Greek [director of photography]". Boyd van Hoeij of The Hollywood Reporter also praised Bakatakis' "soft, milky lighting and always interesting compositions". Later that year, Bakatakis re-teamed with Lanthimos to shoot the music video for "Baby Asteroid" by Leon of Athens.

In 2015, Bakatakis and Lanthimos teamed up yet again for Lanthimos' dark comedy The Lobster, the first English-language film from the director. Bakatakis again changed his style to more distant framing using longer lenses, saying that the improvisation of the film made "everything, including the framing...not so formal". He shot the film using an Arri Alexa and various Panavision lenses, and almost exclusively utilized natural lighting. Post-production for the film took place in Amsterdam, where Bakatakis added a "film look", such as film grain. Guy Lodge of Variety complimented Bakatakis as "an invaluable ally" to Lanthimos, praising his boxy, formal framing and bilious color palette reveal much about the restrictions applied to the people within them". Chang again praised Bakatakis' work, saying that "the meticulously composed images...at times convey the uncanny sensation of peering into a zoo enclosure, the better to study the mating habits of a vaguely familiar and frankly preposterous species".

The following year, he shot the music video for Radiohead's song "Identikit", from their album A Moon Shaped Pool. This marked yet another work with Lanthimos, who directed the video. Later that year, Bakatakis lensed another directorial debut, Benedict Andrews' drama Una, before again collaborating with Lanthimos for the 2017 film The Killing of a Sacred Deer. Film critic Mark Kermode praised how the film's cinematography "accentuates the sense of dread as his cameras creep and crawl through hospital corridors, like the lurking spirits in The Shining – all low-angle prowls and ghostly high glides". Lanthimos noted that the camera moves more in The Killing of a Sacred Deer than many of his other films, saying that he "felt the need for the camera to be almost like another entity" during pre-production and location scouting. He elaborated that he "thought of these high angles, or very low angles, with the camera following people around, creeping from below or above", which ended up working well, with the film's many scenes at a hospital and its numerous corridors. Bakatakis was nominated for the Independent Spirit Award for Best Cinematography at the 33rd Independent Spirit Awards for his work on the film.

== Filmography ==
=== Films ===
Year	Title	Notes
2004	Hardcore	
2005	Kinetta	
2009	Dogtooth	
2010	Attenberg	
2011	Porfirio	
2012	Keep the Lights On	
2012	L	
2014	Blind	
2015	The Lobster	
2016	Una	
2017	The Killing of a Sacred Deer	Nominated – Independent Spirit Award for Best Cinematography
2019	The Lodge	

=== Television ===
Year	Title	Notes
2021	Master of None Presents: Moments in Love	5 episodes

=== Music videos ===
Year	Song	Artist
2014	"Baby Asteroid"	Leon of Athens
2016	"Identikit"	Radiohead
