= Kinetta (film) =

2005 film by Yorgos Lanthimos

- Directed by: Yorgos Lanthimos
- Written by: Yorgos Lanthimos; Yorgos Kakanakis
- Produced by: Athina Rachel Tsangari
- Starring: Evangelia Randou; Aris Servetalis; Costas Xikominos
- Cinematography: Thimios Bakatakis
- Edited by: Yorgos Mavropsaridis
- Production company: Haos Film
- Release dates: 9 September 2005 (TIFF); 22 March 2007 (Greece)
- Running time: 95 minutes
- Country: Greece
- Language: Greek

Kinetta (Greek: Κινέτα, Kineta) is a 2005 Greek experimental drama film directed by Yorgos Lanthimos, produced by Athina Rachel Tsangari and Lanthimos, and written by Lanthimos and Yorgos Kakanakis. It is Lanthimos' solo directorial debut. The film stars Evangelia Randou, Aris Servetalis, and Costas Xikominos.

== Plot ==
During off-season at the Greek seaside resort of Kinetta, three strangers—a police officer out of uniform with a thing for German luxury cars and Russian women, an eccentric photographer, and a hotel chambermaid—join forces for a strange reason: to recreate homicides. Meticulously and with an almost ritualistic approach, the unlikely trio reenact crime scenes of brutal murders, to the point where the boundaries of their own private lives slowly begin to blur.

== Cast ==
- Evangelia Randou as Cleaner
- Aris Servetalis as Photo studio employee
- Costas Xikominos as Police officer
- Youlika Skafida as Beach Victim
- Hector Kaloudis as Farm owner
- Vassilis Karampoulas as Marketer

== Release ==
The film was not released theatrically in the United States in 2005. The film was screened at the 46th Thessaloniki Film Festival. In 2019, the Museum of the Moving Image played the film for nine days in October.

== Reception ==
The film received negative reviews from critics. On review aggregator Rotten Tomatoes, the film holds a 17% approval rating based on reviews from 6 critics, with an average rating of 3.4/10. John DeFore, writing for The Hollywood Reporter, praised the movie's ability to provoke its audience, with the intrusion of humorous shots or moments of color into the otherwise "drearily wintry" aesthetic. He also asserted longtime fans would enjoy the movie, as it "...introduces themes that would continue even into his lauded English-language work."

Writing for The New York Times, Ben Kenigberg gave the film a mixed review, "While Kinetta offers glimpses of visual and staging ideas that Lanthimos would explore more fully in his later works, it remains a cryptic curiosity. The film lacks dialogue and takes time to clarify the dynamics of its characters. Lanthimos used a handheld camera extensively, which some find more irritating than purposeful. In hindsight, Lanthimos would develop a smoother and more controlled sense of filmmaking in his subsequent works".

Variety praised Kinetta," diverges significantly from his previous work. The narrative drifts into a state of dramatic stasis, with eccentric characters and their strange desires. Lanthimos explores the idea that everyone has private weaknesses but avoids conventional storytelling and satire. The actors deliver somnambulistic performances in cryptic roles. Technically, the film presents challenges, with a handheld camera creating an unsettling viewing experience.
