= The Lobster =

2015 film by Yorgos Lanthimos

- Theatrical release poster
- Directed by: Yorgos Lanthimos
- Written by: Efthimis Filippou; Yorgos Lanthimos
- Produced by: Ceci Dempsey; Ed Guiney; Yorgos Lanthimos; Lee Magiday
- Starring: Colin Farrell; Rachel Weisz; Jessica Barden; Olivia Colman; Ashley Jensen; Ariane Labed; Angeliki Papoulia; John C. Reilly; Léa Seydoux; Michael Smiley; Ben Whishaw
- Cinematography: Thimios Bakatakis
- Edited by: Yorgos Mavropsaridis
- Production companies: Element Pictures; Scarlet Films; Faliro House Productions; Haut et Court; Lemming Film; Film4; BFI
- Distributed by: Feelgood Entertainment (Greece); Haut et Court (France); Element Pictures (Ireland); De Filmfreak (Netherlands); Picturehouse Entertainment (United Kingdom)
- Release dates: 15 May 2015 (Cannes); 16 October 2015 (Ireland and United Kingdom); 22 October 2015 (Greece and Netherlands); 28 October 2015 (France)
- Running time: 118 minutes
- Countries: Ireland; United Kingdom; Greece; France; Netherlands
- Languages: English; French
- Budget: $4 million
- Box office: $18 million

The Lobster is a 2015 absurdist black comedy drama film co-produced and directed by Yorgos Lanthimos, who co-wrote it with Efthimis Filippou. It stars Colin Farrell, Rachel Weisz, Jessica Barden, Olivia Colman, Ashley Jensen, Ariane Labed, Angeliki Papoulia, John C. Reilly, Léa Seydoux, Michael Smiley, and Ben Whishaw. The film follows a newly single bachelor who moves into a hotel with other singles, who are all obliged to find a romantic partner within 45 days; otherwise, they will be transformed into animals.

The film was announced in October 2013, with Jason Clarke originally cast in the lead role. After Clarke left production, Farrell replaced him by February 2014, with Weisz also joining the cast after Elizabeth Olsen dropped out. The rest of the cast was rounded out by March at the beginning of principal photography, which concluded in May. Filming largely took place in Dublin and County Kerry. The film is a co-production by Ireland, the United Kingdom, Greece, France, and the Netherlands.

The Lobster premiered at the 2015 Cannes Film Festival on 15 May, where it competed for the Palme d'Or and won the Jury Prize. It was theatrically released in the United Kingdom on 16 October 2015, grossing $18 million on a $4 million budget. The film received positive reviews from critics, with praise for its screenplay, humor, originality, and thematic content, and was nominated for Best Original Screenplay at the 89th Academy Awards and for Outstanding British Film at the 69th British Academy Film Awards.

== Plot ==
David is escorted to a hotel after his wife leaves him for another man. The hotel manager reveals that single people have 45 days to find a partner or they will be transformed into an animal of their choice (the dog accompanying David is his brother Bob). David is set on becoming a lobster, should he fail. David makes the acquaintance of Robert, a man with a lisp, and John, a man with a limp. Guests are fixated on finding a mate with whom they share superficial traits such as minor ailments, which they believe to be the key to compatibility.

The hotel has many rules and rituals: masturbation is banned, but sexual stimulation by the hotel maid is mandatory, and guests attend dances and watch propaganda extolling the advantages of partnership. Residents can extend their deadline by hunting and tranquilizing the single people who live in the forest, with each captured "loner" earning them an additional day. On the way to a hunt, a woman with a fondness for butter biscuits offers David sexual favours, which he declines. She tells him that if she fails to find a mate, she will kill herself by jumping from a hotel window.

John wins the affections of a woman with constant nosebleeds by purposely smashing his nose in secret. They move to the couples' section to begin a month-long trial partnership. David later decides to court a notoriously cruel woman who has tranquilized more loners than anyone else. Their initial conversation is accompanied by the screams of the biscuit-loving woman, who has injured herself by jumping from a first floor window. David pretends to enjoy the woman's suffering to gain the heartless woman's interest. He later joins her in a hot tub where she feigns choking on an olive to test him. Noticing that he makes no attempt to help her, she decides that they are a match, and the two are shifted to the couples' suite. David wakes up one morning and finds she has killed Bob. As David tearfully mourns him, she concludes that their relationship is a lie and attempts to drag him to the hotel manager to have him turned into the "animal that no one wants to be" as punishment. He escapes and, with the help of a sympathetic maid (later revealed as a mole working for the loners), tranquilizes his partner and transforms her into an unspecified animal.

David escapes the hotel and joins the loners in the woods. In contrast to the hotel, they forbid any kind of romance, which is punishable by mutilation. David, who is short-sighted, begins a secret relationship with a woman who is also short-sighted. They develop a gestural language they use to communicate. They are taken on covert missions to the nearby city, where their cover requires them to appear as husband and wife, which they secretly enjoy. Because they have the required superficial traits in common and genuinely enjoy each other's company, they make a plan to leave the loners and rejoin society.

The loners launch a raid to sabotage the hotel. David tells the woman with nosebleeds that John has been faking his. Other loners hold the hotel manager and her husband at gunpoint, tricking him into shooting his wife to save himself, but the gun is not loaded. They leave the couple to face each other.

The leader of the loners obtains the short-sighted woman's journal and discovers David's plan to escape with her. The leader and the maid take the woman to the city, ostensibly to have an operation to cure her short-sightedness, but instead have her blinded. The woman attempts to stab the leader, but the leader uses the maid as a human shield and pretends to die when the woman stabs the maid to death. David and the woman try to find something else that they have in common, to no avail. One morning, David overpowers the leader, leaving her tied up in an open grave to be eaten alive by wild dogs. He and the blind woman escape to the city and stop at a restaurant. David goes to the restroom and hesitantly prepares to blind himself with a steak knife.

== Cast ==
- Colin Farrell as David
- Rachel Weisz as Short Sighted Woman, the Narrator
- Léa Seydoux as Loner Leader
- Ariane Labed as The Maid
- Ben Whishaw as John, Limping Man
- Angeliki Papoulia as Heartless Woman
- John C. Reilly as Robert, Lisping Man
- Jessica Barden as Nosebleed Woman
- Olivia Colman as Hotel Manager
- Stavroula Karalidou as Bob the Dog
- Ashley Jensen as Biscuit Woman
- Michael Smiley as Loner Swimmer
- Roger Ashton-Griffiths as Doctor
- Seán Duggan as Guard Waiter
- Ewen MacIntosh as Hotel Guard

== Production ==
Principal photography began on 24 March 2014, and concluded on 9 May 2014. Filming took place in Dublin, Ireland, which represents "The City" in the film, and also at locations in and around County Kerry, including Sneem, Dromore Woods and Kenmare. The hotel used was the Parknasilla Resort and Spa hotel, near Sneem. Rachel Weisz referenced her training with Philippe Gaulier at École Philippe Gaulier as a direct influence on her performance in the film.

=== Casting ===
It was originally reported on 23 October 2013 that Jason Clarke would lead the cast, with support from Ben Whishaw, Léa Seydoux, Olivia Colman, Ariane Labed, and Angeliki Papoulia. Clarke dropped out of the film due to scheduling conflicts with Everest, and on 3 February it was announced that Colin Farrell and Rachel Weisz would star in The Lobster. Elizabeth Olsen was approached to star in the film, but turned down the offer due to her commitments with Marvel Studios for Avengers: Age of Ultron. She later wondered to what entirely different path the movie could have taken her acting career, but ultimately felt that she made the right decision. Shortly after principal photography began, John C. Reilly and Ashley Jensen joined the cast on 31 March 2014.

== Release ==
In May 2014, it was announced that Sony Pictures Worldwide Acquisitions acquired the distribution rights for Australia, New Zealand, German-speaking Europe, Scandinavia, the CIS, Eastern Europe, and Latin America, among others. A film still featuring Farrell, Whishaw, and Reilly was released around the same time. The film's posters were designed by Vasilis Marmatakis, with the Colin Farrell one sheet version considered by professional poster designer Adrian Curry the second-best poster of the 2010s.

In May 2015, Alchemy tentatively acquired U.S. distribution rights. However, owing to financial troubles, a cash-strapped Alchemy sold those rights in February 2016 to A24 instead. Originally scheduled for an 11 March 2016 release, it was rescheduled to 13 May 2016.

== Reception ==
=== Critical response ===
On Rotten Tomatoes, the film has an approval rating of 88% based on reviews from 268 critics, with an average rating of 7.6/10. The website's critical consensus reads, "As strange as it is thrillingly ambitious, The Lobster is definitely an acquired taste — but for viewers with the fortitude to crack through Yorgos Lanthimos' offbeat sensibilities, it should prove a savory cinematic treat". On Metacritic, which assigns a weighted average score out of 100 to reviews from mainstream critics, the film received an average score of 82, based on 44 reviews, indicating "universal acclaim".

Oliver Lyttelton of The Playlist awarded the film an "A" grade and described it as "an atypically rich and substantial comedy" with "an uproarious yet deadpan satire concerning societal constructs, dating mores and power structures that also manages to be a surprisingly moving, gloriously weird love story". He concluded that the film was Lanthimos' "most accessible and purely enjoyable film yet". Chris Nashawaty of Entertainment Weekly gave a positive review and commended the film for being "visually stunning, narratively bold, and totally singular", adding that "it opens [one's] eyes to a new way of storytelling".

Guy Lodge, writing for Variety, called the film "a wickedly funny, unexpectedly moving satire of couple-fixated society", elaborating that Lanthimos' "confounding setup emerges as a brilliant allegory for the increasingly superficial systems of contemporary courtship, including the like-for-like algorithms of online dating sites and the hot-or-not snap judgments of Tinder".

Peter Bradshaw of The Guardian rated the film three stars out of five, and wrote that The Lobster is "elegant and eccentric in Lanthimos' familiar style", but "appears to run out of ideas at its mid-way point". Similarly, reviews in the Cleveland Plain Dealer and the Vancouver Sun judged the film unable to sustain itself across its full runtime. IGN awarded it a score of 8.5 out of 10, saying "Colin Farrell heads up this surreal, hilarious and ultimately quite disturbing tale."

Wai Chee Dimock, writing in the Los Angeles Review of Books, called The Lobster a "fable of purgatory" and compared the film to the work of Samuel Beckett, saying that, for this all-Greek team, "absurdist theater is second nature, as it was second nature to the Irish Beckett a century ago".

Timothy Laurie and Hannah Stark, writing in the New Review of Film and Television Studies, praise The Lobster as "both a satire of compulsory coupling and an equally damning critique of libertarian individualism as an alternative to domestic monogamy".

In 2021, members of Writers Guild of America West (WGAW) and Writers Guild of America East (WGAE) voted its screenplay 81st in the WGA’s 101 Greatest Screenplays of the 21st Century (so far). In 2025, it was one of the films voted for the "Readers' Choice" edition of The New York Times' list of "The 100 Best Movies of the 21st Century," finishing at number 192.

=== Accolades ===
List of awards and nominations for The Lobster
Award / film festival	Category	Recipient(s)	Result
Academy Awards	Best Original Screenplay	Yorgos Lanthimos and Efthimis Filippou	Nominated
ACE Eddie Awards	Best Edited Feature Film – Comedy or Musical	Yorgos Mavropsaridis	Nominated
Austin Film Critics Association	Best Film	The Lobster	8th Place
Austin Film Critics Association	Best Actor	Colin Farrell	Nominated
Austin Film Critics Association	Best Original Screenplay	Yorgos Lanthimos and Efthimis Filippou	Nominated
Belgian Film Critics Association	Grand Prix	The Lobster	Nominated
British Academy Film Awards	Outstanding British Film	The Lobster	Nominated
British Independent Film Awards	Best British Independent Film	The Lobster	Nominated
British Independent Film Awards	Best Director	Yorgos Lanthimos	Nominated
British Independent Film Awards	Best Actor	Colin Farrell	Nominated
British Independent Film Awards	Best Supporting Actress	Olivia Colman	Won
British Independent Film Awards	Best Supporting Actor	Ben Whishaw	Nominated
British Independent Film Awards	Best Screenplay	Yorgos Lanthimos and Efthimis Filippou	Nominated
British Independent Film Awards	Producer of the Year	Ceci Dempsey, Ed Guiney, Yorgos Lanthimos, and Lee Magiday	Nominated
Cannes Film Festival	Palme d'Or	The Lobster	Nominated
Cannes Film Festival	Jury Prize	The Lobster	Won
Cannes Film Festival	Queer Palm – Special Mention	The Lobster	Won
Cannes Film Festival	Palm Dog Award – Grand Jury Prize	Bob the dog	Won
Crested Butte Film Festival	Best Narrative Feature	The Lobster	Won
Chicago Film Critics Association	Best Actor	Colin Farrell	Nominated
Chicago Film Critics Association	Best Original Screenplay	Yorgos Lanthimos and Efthimis Filippou	Nominated
Critics' Choice Awards	Best Original Screenplay	Yorgos Lanthimos and Efthimis Filippou	Nominated
Dorian Awards	Screenplay of the Year	Yorgos Lanthimos and Efthimis Filippou	Nominated
Dublin Film Critics' Circle	Best Irish Film	The Lobster	5th place
Dublin Film Critics' Circle	Best Actor	Colin Farrell	5th place
European Film Awards	Best European Film	The Lobster	Nominated
European Film Awards	Best European Director	Yorgos Lanthimos	Nominated
European Film Awards	Best European Actor	Colin Farrell	Nominated
European Film Awards	Best European Screenwriter	Yorgos Lanthimos and Efthimis Filippou	Won
European Film Awards	Best Costume Designer	Sarah Blenkinsop	Won
European Film Awards	People's Choice Award	The Lobster	Nominated
Evening Standard British Film Awards	Best Film	The Lobster	Nominated
Evening Standard British Film Awards	Award for Comedy	Olivia Colman	Nominated
Evening Standard British Film Awards	Award for Comedy	Colin Farrell	Nominated
Film Fest Gent	Georges Delerue Award for Best Sound Design	The Lobster	Won
Florida Film Critics Circle	Best Film	The Lobster	Won
Florida Film Critics Circle	Best Director	Yorgos Lanthimos	Runner-up
Florida Film Critics Circle	Best Original Screenplay	Yorgos Lanthimos and Efthimis Filippou	Won
Golden Globe Awards	Best Actor – Motion Picture Musical or Comedy	Colin Farrell	Nominated
Golden Tomato Awards	Best Sci-Fi/Fantasy Movie 2016	The Lobster	4th Place
IndieWire Critics Poll	Best Actor	Colin Farrell	3rd Place
IndieWire Critics Poll	Best Screenplay	The Lobster	5th Place
Irish Film & Television Awards	Best Actor in a Lead Role (Film)	Colin Farrell	Nominated
London Film Critics' Circle	British / Irish Film of the Year	The Lobster	Nominated
London Film Critics' Circle	Supporting Actress of the Year	Olivia Colman	Nominated
London Film Critics' Circle	British / Irish Actor of the Year	Colin Farrell	Nominated
Los Angeles Film Critics Association	Best Screenplay	Yorgos Lanthimos and Efthimis Filippou	Won
Miami International Film Festival	Grand Jury Award for Best Director	Yorgos Lanthimos	Won
Online Film Critics Society 2015	Best Non-U.S. Films	The Lobster	Won
Online Film Critics Society 2016	Best Original Screenplay	Yorgos Lanthimos and Efthimis Filippou	Nominated
Rotterdam International Film Festival	ARTE International Prize for Best CineMart 2013 Project	The Lobster	Won
San Diego Film Critics Society	Best Original Screenplay	Yorgos Lanthimos and Efthimis Filippou	Runner-up
San Francisco Film Critics Circle	Best Original Screenplay	Yorgos Lanthimos and Efthimis Filippou	Nominated
Satellite Awards	Best Original Screenplay	Yorgos Lanthimos and Efthimis Filippou	Nominated
Washington D.C. Area Film Critics Association	Best Original Screenplay	Yorgos Lanthimos and Efthimis Filippou	Nominated
