= Dogtooth (film) =

2009 film by Yorgos Lanthimos

- Theatrical release poster
- Greek: Κυνόδοντας
- Directed by: Yorgos Lanthimos
- Written by: Yorgos Lanthimos; Efthymis Filippou
- Produced by: Iraklis Mavroidis; Athina Rachel Tsangari; Yorgos Tsourgiannis
- Starring: Christos Stergioglou; Michelle Valley; Angeliki Papoulia; Christos Passalis; Mary Tsoni; Anna Kalaitzidou
- Cinematography: Thimios Bakatakis
- Edited by: Yorgos Mavropsaridis
- Production company: Boo Productions
- Distributed by: Feelgood Entertainment
- Release dates: 18 May 2009 (Cannes); 11 November 2009 (Greece)
- Running time: 97 minutes
- Country: Greece
- Language: Greek
- Budget: €250,000
- Box office: $1.4 million

Dogtooth (Greek: Κυνόδοντας, romanized: Kynodontas) is a 2009 Greek absurdist psychological drama film directed by Yorgos Lanthimos. Written by Lanthimos and Efthymis Filippou, the film is about a husband and wife (Christos Stergioglou and Michelle Valley) who keep their children (Angeliki Papoulia, Christos Passalis, and Mary Tsoni) ignorant of the world outside their property well into adulthood.

Dogtooth is Lanthimos's third feature film. It won the Prix Un Certain Regard at the 2009 Cannes Film Festival and was nominated for Best Foreign Language Film at the 83rd Academy Awards.

The film also gained notoriety due its many resemblances to the 1972 Mexican film The Castle of Purity. by Arturo Ripstein.

== Plot ==
A couple and their adult son and two adult daughters live in a fenced compound. The children have no knowledge of the outside world; their parents say they will be ready to leave once they lose a dogtooth, and that one can safely leave only by car. The children entertain themselves with endurance games, such as holding their hands under hot water. They believe they have a brother on the other side of the fence to whom they throw supplies. The parents reward good behavior with stickers and bad with violence.

The father pays an employee of his factory, Christina, to come to the house and have sex with the son. Frustrated by the son's refusal to give her cunnilingus, Christina trades her headband with the elder daughter in exchange for cunnilingus from her. The elder daughter convinces the younger daughter to lick her shoulder by bartering the headband. Later, the younger daughter volunteers to lick the elder again. The elder has nothing to offer in exchange, but the younger does not mind and experiments by licking other body parts.

The father visits a dog training facility and demands to have his dog returned. The trainer refuses because the dog has not finished its training, and asks: "Do we want an animal or a friend?" When the children are terrified by a stray cat in the garden, the son kills it with a pair of pruning shears. Deciding to take advantage of the incident, the father shreds his clothes, covers himself in fake blood, and tells his children that their unseen brother was killed by a cat, the most dangerous creature. After he teaches them to bark on all fours to fend off cats, the family holds a memorial service for the brother.

Christina again barters for oral sex from the elder daughter. The daughter rejects her offer of hair gel and demands the Hollywood VHS tapes in her bag. She watches the films (Rocky IV and Jaws) in secret and afterwards recreates scenes and quotes their dialogue. When the father discovers the tapes, he beats her with one of them, then goes to Christina's flat and hits her with her VCR, cursing her future children to be corrupted by "bad influences".

The parents decide that, with Christina no longer available, they will have the son choose one of his sisters as a new sexual partner. After fondling both sisters with his eyes closed, he chooses the elder. She is uncomfortable during their sex and afterwards threatens her brother in the style of Hollywood film dialogues.

During a performance for the parents' wedding anniversary, the younger daughter stops to rest, but the elder continues and dances the choreography from Flashdance, disturbing her parents. That night, she knocks out one of her dogteeth with a dumbbell and hides in the boot of her father's car. The father discovers her tooth fragments and searches for her fruitlessly. He drives to work the next day; the car sits outside the factory, unattended.

== Cast ==
- Christos Stergioglou as Father
- Michelle Valley as Mother
- Angeliki Papoulia as Older Daughter
- Christos Passalis as Son
- Mary Tsoni as Younger Daughter
- Anna Kalaitzidou as Christina
- Steve Krikris as Father's co-worker
- Athanasia Petropoulou as Father's secretary
- Alexander Voulgaris as the dog trainer

== Production ==
Dogtooth was the feature film debut for Boo Productions, an Athens-based advertising company. The Greek Film Center supported the project with about €200,000, and much of the production was done with help from volunteers. Another €50,000 was offered by the production studio. The script was completed in about 2 years, with rehearsals lasting 1 1/2 months. The film was shot in about 1 month (in August 2008), and editing took 6 months.

Anna Kalaitzidou and Christos Passalis were stage actors who were cast after having worked with Lanthimos earlier. Mary Tsoni was not a professional actress; she was a singer in a punk band. Lanthimos had an open approach to both acting and visual style and felt it would look fake if he involved himself too much in the details. Only when rehearsals started did he begin to develop an idea of the style in which the film should be shot: one where he tried to combine a realistic environment with "really strict framing and a cool, surreal look to go with the narrative".

== Release ==
The film premiered at the 62nd Cannes Film Festival on 18 May 2009, and went on to screen at festivals such as the Toronto International Film Festival and the Maryland Film Festival.

It was released in Greece on 11 November 2009 by Feelgood Entertainment. Verve Pictures acquired distribution rights for the United Kingdom and released it on 23 April 2010. Kino International released it in the United States on 25 June 2010.

== Reception ==
=== Greek ===
Greek critic Dimitris Danikas gave Dogtooth a rating of eight out of ten ("with enthusiasm"), calling it "black, surreal, nightmarish" and writing that Dogtooth is as important for Greek cinema as Theodoros Angelopoulos's 1970 film Reconstitution. Danikas added, "Lanthimos composes and goes from one level to another like a wildcat-creator, constantly and continuously maintaining the same rigorous style. Hence the aphasia; hence the uniformity; hence the submission and the scheduled mass culture; hence also the serial killer; hence, however, the disobedience, the anarchy. As I said at the beginning: Dogtooth has the surrealism of Buñuel, the scalpel of Haneke, the underground horror of a thriller without the splatter. Perfect." Danikas characterized Dogtooth's Academy Award nomination as "the greatest Greek triumph of recent years." Columnist Dimitris Bouras, writing for Kathimerini, mentioned "the beneficial effects that the prestigious award could have" and wrote that the nomination reveals three interesting facts: "1) in Greece we need to be extroverts (and not only in cinema), 2) exportable product is whatever has an identity, 3) Dogtooth's nomination is like an investment— manna from the heaven of Hollywood for the developing Greek cinema."

=== International ===
On review aggregator website Rotten Tomatoes, the film has a 93% approval rating based on review from 73 critics, with an average score of 7.70/10; the site's "critics consensus" reads: "It'll be too disturbing— and meandering— for some, but Dogtooth is as disturbing and startlingly original as modern filmmaking gets". On Metacritic, the film has a weighted average score of 72 out of 100 based on 18 critics, indicating "generally favorable reviews".

Alistair Harkness of The Scotsman hailed Lanthimos as "a bold new voice on the world cinema scene, someone who might soon be elevated to a similar position as those twin pillars of Euro provocation: Lars von Trier and Michael Haneke", but added that the film is "not [...] designed simply to shock in the way von Trier's work often does, [...] nor does it have that annoyingly prescriptive, punitive air of superiority favoured by Haneke's films."

Peter Bradshaw of The Guardian praised the filmmaking, finding Dogtooth "superbly shot, with some deadpan, elegant compositions, and intentionally skewiff framings". Roger Ebert of the Chicago Sun-Times gave the film three out of four stars, noting the director's "complete command of visuals and performances. His cinematography is like a series of family photographs of a family with something wrong with it. His dialogue sounds composed entirely of sentences memorized from tourist phrase books." Mark Olsen of the Los Angeles Times wrote that "All of the film's purposeful weirdness is conveyed with an unaffected simplicity that recalls the dead-aim haphazard compositions of photographer William Eggleston", concluding that, "as a film, it's pure and singular, but it's not quite fully formed enough to be what one could call truly visionary."

A. O. Scott of The New York Times wrote that the film "at times seems as much an exercise in perversity as an examination of it", and that "The static wide-screen compositions are beautiful and strange, with the heads and limbs of the characters frequently cropped. The light is gauzy and diffuse, helping to produce an atmosphere that is insistently and not always unpleasantly dreamlike. You might think of paintings by Balthus or maybe Alex Katz, though the implied stories in those pictures are more genuinely evocative and haunting than the actual narrative of Dogtooth."

Several reviewers, such as Harkness and Bradshaw, made comparisons to the 2008 Fritzl case, although they noted that the screenplay was written before the case emerged. Scott, like Ebert, made references to homeschooling.

The film's larger meaning eluded easy expression. Scott called the film "a conversation piece. Though the conversation may... be more along the lines of: 'What was that?' 'I don't know. Weird.' 'Yeah.' [shudder]. 'Weird.'" Olsen saw Dogtooth's substance as "part enigma, part allegory and even part sci-fi in its creation of a completely alternate reality." Ebert found a "message" in the film, which he put as: "God help children whose parents insanely demand unquestioning obedience to their deranged standards.... [S]ome have even described the film as a comedy. I wasn't laughing." For Bradshaw, the film investigates "the essential strangeness of something society insists is the benchmark of normality: the family, a walled city state with its own autocratic rule and untellable secrets." Harkness noted the "absolute mockery the situation makes of the perfect family ideal", where "Lanthimos isn't interested in making specific political or social points and he refuses to offer any clarifying backstory", and found Dogtooth's oddness "as organic and playful as its impact is incisor sharp."

In a 2012 interview, filmmaker David Lynch called Dogtooth "a fantastic comedy".

In July 2025, it ranked number 84 on Rolling Stone's list of "The 100 Best Movies of the 21st Century." Also that month, it was one of the films voted for the "Readers' Choice" edition of The New York Times' list of "The 100 Best Movies of the 21st Century," finishing at number 301.

=== Accolades ===
Greek Prime Minister George Papandreou ended the Cabinet meeting on 25 January 2011 by saying: "The news that the film Dogtooth by Yorgos Lanthimos is nominated for Best Foreign Language Film goes far beyond the world of cinema, arts and culture. It concerns the whole country, its people, the new generation of artists who follow the motto 'Yes, we can do it' during difficult times." He continued, "I won't say that the news shows that miracles happen, because the success of Yorgos Lanthimos is based on hard work, talent and his endless potential. Features that characterize the creative forces which lead Greece to a new era; forces which deserve our support and they will have it. Bravo Yorgos."

The Greek Film Committee unanimously chose Dogtooth to represent Greece at the Oscars.

Accolades for Dogtooth
Award	Category	Recipient(s)	Result
Academy Awards	Best Foreign Language Film	Yorgos Lanthimos	Nominated
British Independent Film Awards	Best Foreign Film	Yorgos Lanthimos	Nominated
Cannes Film Festival	Prix Un Certain Regard	Yorgos Lanthimos	Won
Cannes Film Festival	Prix de la Jeunesse	Yorgos Lanthimos	Won
Dublin International Film Festival	Dublin Film Critics Award	Yorgos Lanthimos	Won
Estoril Film Festival	Grande Premio	Yorgos Lanthimos	Won
Hellenic Film Academy Awards	Best Feature Film	Yorgos Lanthimos	Won
Hellenic Film Academy Awards	Best Director	Yorgos Lanthimos	Won
Hellenic Film Academy Awards	Best Screenplay	Yorgos Lanthimos and Efthymis Filippou	Won
Hellenic Film Academy Awards	Best Actress	Angeliki Papoulia	Nominated
Hellenic Film Academy Awards	Best Actor	Christos Sterioglou	Nominated
Hellenic Film Academy Awards	Best Supporting Actor	Christos Passalis	Won
Hellenic Film Academy Awards	Best Post-Production	Yorgos Mavropsaridis	Won
Hellenic Film Academy Awards	Award for Special Effects and Film Innovation	George and Roulis Alahouzos	Nominated
Ljubljana International Film Festival	Kingfisher Award	Yorgos Lanthimos	Won
Mar del Plata Film Festival	Best Film	Yorgos Lanthimos	Nominated
Montréal Festival of New Cinema	Feature Film Award	Yorgos Lanthimos	Won
RiverRun International Film Festival	Best Director	Yorgos Lanthimos	Won
Sarajevo Film Festival	Special Jury Prize	Yorgos Lanthimos	Won
Sarajevo Film Festival	Heart of Sarajevo (Best Actress)	Angeliki Papoulia and Mary Tsoni	Won
Sitges Film Festival	Best Motion Picture Fantastic Award	Yorgos Lanthimos	Won
Sitges Film Festival	Citizen Kane Award for Best Directorial Revelation	Yorgos Lanthimos	Won
Sitges Film Festival	Best Film	Yorgos Lanthimos	Nominated
Stockholm International Film Festival	Bronze Horse	Yorgos Lanthimos	Won

== See also ==
- List of Greek submissions for the Academy Award for Best Foreign Language Film
- List of submissions to the 83rd Academy Awards for Best Foreign Language Film
