= Shared Heritage =

French online library program

Shared heritage (French: Patrimoines Partagés) is a program launched by the National Library of France (BNF) in 2016 to gather outstanding documents related to the relations between France and the world on dedicated online libraries. The contents are from the collections of the BNF, of similar heritage libraries from all over the world, such as the National Diet Library of Japan, the National Library of Poland, and from collections of other research and academic institutions, as the Oriental Library of Saint Joseph University (Lebanon). These online libraries also aim to preserve and save endangered heritages.

As of 2026, seven collections are online (Libraries of the Middle East, France-Brazil, France-China, France-Poland, France-South Asia, France-Vietnam, and France in the Americas.

== Bibliothèques d’Orient (Libraries of the Middle East) ==
Launched in September 2017, Bibliothèques d’Orient (Libraries of the Middle East) is the second digital library created in the frames of the Shared Heritage project. Nine libraries and heritage institutions worked together to gather over 7000 documents recounting the historical relationships between France and countries from the Middle East:

- Dominican Institute for Oriental Studies;
- French Institute of Oriental Archeology;
- Alexandrine Studies Center;
- French Biblic and Archeologic School of Jerusalem;
- Oriental Library of Saint Joseph University;
- SALT (Istanbul-Ankara);
- French Institute for Anatolian Studies (Istanbul);
- French Institute of the Near-East (Beirut);
- National Library of France.

The content is from the collections of those institutions and is very diverse: the website hosts digitalized sacred books, manuscripts, travel writings, newspapers, prints, maps, photographs... Most of the documents are from the 19th and 20th centuries, although older contents can be founds, such as Qumran manuscripts or early Quranic manuscripts

The documents are split into seven categories corresponding to essential topics of Oriental studies: Crossroads (gathering content related to trade, travels, roads...); Religions, Communities, Knowledge (about Archeology, early and modern Oriental studies, Sciences, Astronomy, Political philosophy of the Near-East...), Imaginary (on Orientalism in the arts and Literature) and Personalities. Those categories are divided into more specific ones.

== France-Pologne (France-Poland) ==
The digital library ‘’France-Pologne’’, in English France-Poland, has been officially inaugurated in February 2018, at the City Hall of Nancy, France. The website hosts around a thousand books, official documents, manuscripts, newspapers, prints and photographs illustrating the links between the two countries over the time, as the prints of Jan Ziarnko or the noteworthy experience notebooks on radioactivity of Marie Curie. The documents are from the collections of the French National Audiovisual Institute (INA), the French National Library, the National Library of Poland, the French National Museum of the History of Immigration, the Public Libraries of Nancy and the ‘’Contemporaine’’.

== France-Japon (France-Japan) ==
France-Japon (or France-Japan) was initially part of a virtual exhibition co-organized with the National Diet Library of Japan to celebrate the relationships between the two countries. The exhibition opened in December 2014, for the anniversary of the foundation of the French-Japanese House of Tokyo, in 1924. The website is now one of the Shared Heritage digital libraries where can be found digitalized issues of the Japon Artistique published by Siegfried Bing, Japanese prints, the Manga of Hokusai, early photographs of Japan.

== La France au Brésil (France in Brazil) ==
La France au Brésil (or France-Brazil) is a digital library launched by the National Library of Brazil and the French National Library in 2009 as a closing of the year dedicated to the celebration of the relationships between the two countries. As the most recent websites of Shared Heritage, the content from the collections of the two institutions is split into main categories reflecting important topics and moments of the relations, such as France Antarctique or Equinoctial France. It also gathers documents on scientific missions and exchanges, as the foundation of the School Mines of Ouro Preto by Claude-Henri Gorceix in 1875, travel writings, French writers inspired by Brazil (Voltaire, Edouard Corbière...) or even exiled there, as Georges Bernanos.
