= Aleksandra Waliszewska =

Polish artist (born 1976)

- Born: January 30, 1976 (age 50); Warsaw, Polish People's Republic
- Education: Academy of Fine Arts in Warsaw
- Occupation: Painter

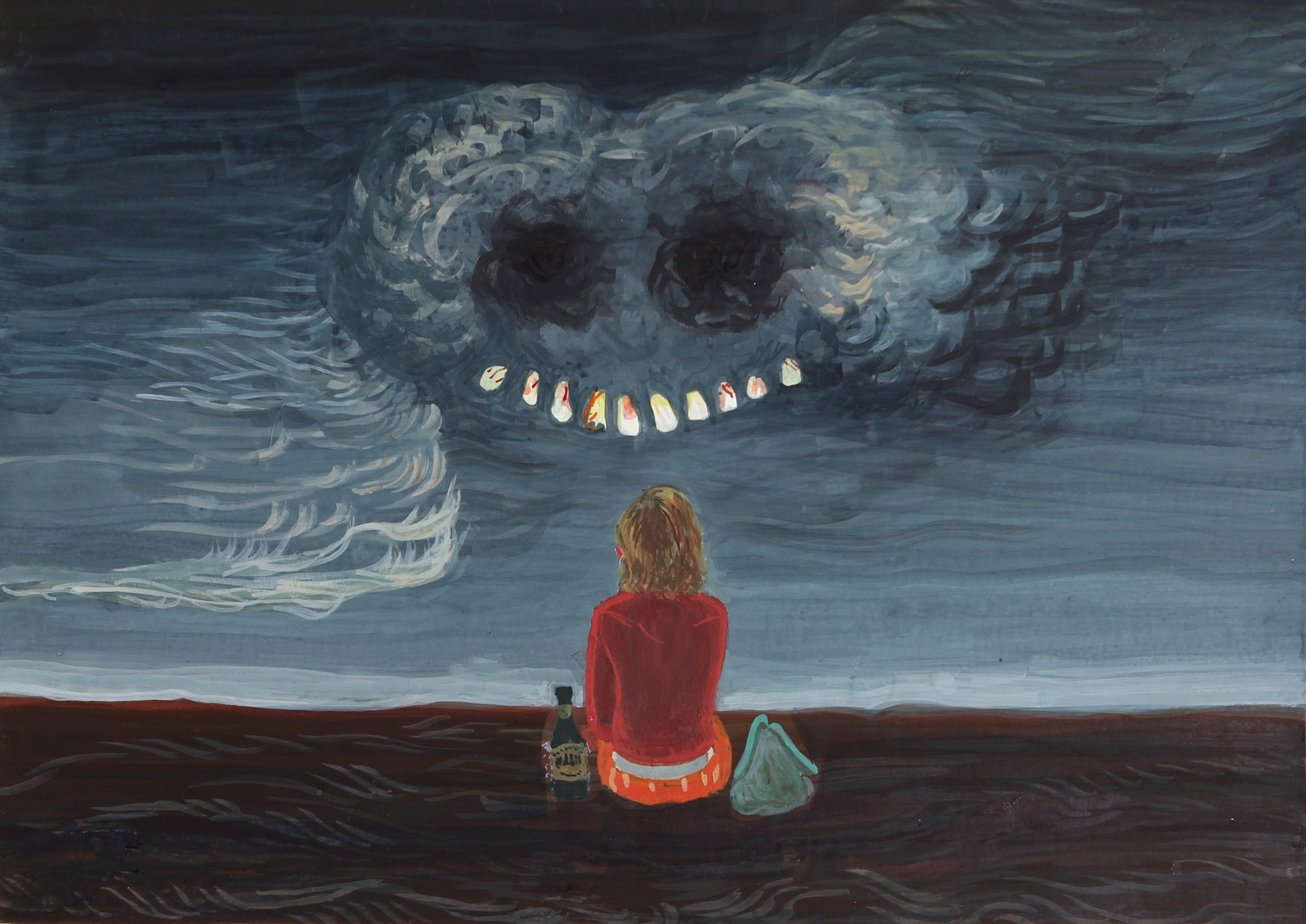
Bez tytułu (Untitled; 2012–2013)

Aleksandra Waliszewska (born January 30, 1976) is an artist from Warsaw, Poland, primarily working as a painter. Her surreal, horrific, highly symbolic, and sometimes gory work has been compared to Hieronymous Bosch and Francisco de Goya, and her style has been called "gothic". Informed by Balto-Slavic folklore such as the upiór, her paintings often depict supernatural figures in urban landscapes.

== Biography ==
Waliszewska was born in Warsaw, where she still lives and works. Her mother and grandmother were both sculptors, and her mother was also a skilled drawer. Waliszewska began creating art from an early age, and says she made her first art sale at the age of 10, trading a book of drawings for a package of sesame snaps. The psychiatrist Andrzej Samson was an early admirer. She struggled with art in school, and admits to having cheated on her art school entrance exams. Graduating from art school in 2001, she received a scholarship from the Minister of Culture and Art in 2003. Waliszewska has stated that Pieter Bruegel's Landscape with the Fall of Icarus is a favorite of hers, and that art has been in decline since the Quattrocento, but also claims the 16th-century Polish artists Tomasz Treter and Jan Ziarnko as influences. She credits a 2006 viewing of the Japanese film Tamala 2010: A Punk Cat in Space with allowing her to move her focus away from "high art".

Waliszewska said in 2022 that she begins a new painting nearly every day. She often uses herself as an anatomical model. Her cat Mitusia was a common subject until its death in 2021.

She has had an interest in fashion design since her teens, and has mentioned Chloë Sevigny's outfit in the music video for the Sonic Youth song "Sugar Kane" as a point of reference. She has collaborated with various designers, including on Susie Cave's "Vampire's Wife" fashion line. Susie's husband, the musician Nick Cave, is an avowed fan. She has also collaborated with Maurizio Cattelan, Joan Cornellà, Warren Ellis, Allison Schulnik, David Tibet and Szczepan Twardoch. In 2012 she co-wrote the short film The Capsule with director Athina Rachel Tsangari. She is unusual among artists in her large Instagram following, which was more than 115,000 as of 2022.

The Museum of Modern Art, Warsaw, holds a collection of her works.

== Exhibitions ==
- 2002: Solo; DAP Gallery, Warsaw
- 2002: Solo; Test Gallery, Warzaw
- 2006: 21st Century Painting; Zachęta National Gallery of Art, Warsaw
- 2007: Themselves About Themselves; Museum of Art, Łódź
- 2009: Flowers On The Attic; Geppert Appartment, Wrocław
- 2009: I Was A Dog; Design Gallery BWA, Wrocław
- 2009: Frédéric Magazine arts factory; Paris
- 2010: Don’t Even Think About It; Leto Gallery, Warsaw
- 2010: Biennale; Le Havre
- 2010: Heroes of Might and Magic; CCA Ujazdowski Castle, Warsaw
- 2011: Chapter Three: Pain (solo); ReMap3, Athens
- 2011: Sweatboxing II; Leto Gallery, Warsaw
- 2011: Frédéric Magazine; Galerie Jean Marc Thèvenet, Paris
- 2012: Nasty Child; CCA Ujazdowski Castle, Warsaw
- 2014: 6th edition of the Narracje Festival; Gdańsk
- 2014: Złote Rączki Drżą / Gold Hands Tremble (solo); Leto Gallery, Warsaw
- 2015: Gdyby Dwa Morza Miały Się Spotkać / Lest the Two Seas Meet; Museum of Modern Art, Warsaw
- 2016: Piwnica / Cellar animation; Leto Gallery, Warsaw
- 2017: Der Teufelistein Eichhörnchen / The Devil is a Squirrel (solo); Jerke Museum, Recklinghausen
- 2018: Hawrot, Krajewska, Waliszewska; Leto Gallery, Warsaw
- 2019: FarbaZnaczyKrew / Paint, Also Known As Blood; Museum of Modern Art, Warsaw
- 2022: The Dark Arts; Museum of Modern Art, Warsaw
