= REM: International Engineering Journal =

- Discipline: Engineering
- Language: English
- Edited by: Jório Coelho

Publication details
- Former name: REM: Revista Escola de Minas
- History: 1936–present
- Publisher: Escola de Minas (Brazil)
- Open access: Yes
- License: Creative Commons Attribution License

Standard abbreviations
- ISO 4: REM

Indexing
- ISSN: 0370-4467 (print); 2448-167X (web)
- OCLC no.: 163390304

Links
- Journal homepage

REM: International Engineering Journal is a peer-reviewed open access scholarly journal publishing research articles across civil, geological, metallurgical, mechanical, and mining engineering. It is a journal published by the School of Mines of Ouro Preto (part of the Federal University of Ouro Preto) and made available online on the SciELO platform. The current editor-in-chief is Jório Coelho. It changed name from REM: Revista Escola de Minas to the current title in 2016. The journal is sponsored by the Brazilian National Council for Scientific and Technological Development (CNPq) and Fundação Gorceix (named after Claude-Henri Gorceix).

== Abstracting and indexing ==
The journal is abstracted and indexed in:

- Scopus
- DOAJ
