= Harvest (2024 film) =

British folk horror film

- Film poster
- Directed by: Athina Rachel Tsangari
- Screenplay by: Athina Rachel Tsangari; Joslyn Barnes
- Based on: Harvest by Jim Crace
- Produced by: Joslyn Barnes; Marie-Elena Dyche; Viola Fügen; Rebecca O'Brien; Athina Rachel Tsangari; Michael Weber
- Starring: Caleb Landry Jones; Harry Melling; Rosy McEwen; Arinzé Kene; Thalissa Teixeira; Frank Dillane
- Cinematography: Sean Price Williams
- Edited by: Matthew Johnson; Nico Leunen
- Music by: Nicolas Becker; Ian Hassett; Caleb Landry Jones; Lexx
- Production companies: Sixteen Films; Match Factory Productions; Louverture Films; In Bloom; Haos Film; Faliro House; Meraki Films; BBC Film
- Distributed by: Mubi
- Release date: September 3, 2024 (Venice)
- Running time: 131 minutes
- Countries: United Kingdom; Germany; United States
- Language: English

Harvest is a 2024 folk horror film directed by Athina Rachel Tsangari. It is adapted by Joslyn Barnes and Tsangari from the 2013 book by Jim Crace, and stars Caleb Landry Jones and Harry Melling. The film premiered at the 81st Venice International Film Festival, where it was competing for the Golden Lion.

== Premise ==
The film is set in Scotland during the Georgian-period Highland Clearances, depicting the forced expropriation of peasants from the feudal common land owing to the enclosures, and their transformation into propertyless workers.

== Cast ==
- Caleb Landry Jones as Walter Thirsk
- Harry Melling as Mayor Charles Kent
- Rosy McEwen as Kitty Gosse
- Arinzé Kene as Phillip "Quill" Earle
- Thalissa Teixeira as Mistress Beldam
- Frank Dillane as Edmund Jordan
- Stephen McMillian as Brooker Higgs
- Logan Buchanan
- Gary Maitland
- Noor Dillan-Night
- Antonia Quirke
- Ruby Heritage Crabb
- Maya Bonniwell
- Chester Hayes
- Oran Charlton
- Gregor Warnock
- Holly Blakey
- Lupi Moll
- Lisa Thompson
- Andrew MacKeand
- Tom Bonniwell
- Nicola Moll
- Jack Mackay
- Edith Elliott
- Paul Fegan
- William Alexander
- Leonie Charlton
- Rory Barraclough
- OG
- Campbell Cameron
- Joy Cameron

== Production ==
=== Development ===
Athina Rachel Tsangari was attached to direct the film in November 2020 with the project having a script from Joslyn Barnes adapting the Booker Prize–nominated novel by Jim Crace from 2013. Production on the project is by Rebecca O'Brien for Sixteen Films (UK) and Joslyn Barnes for Louverture Films (USA), with co-production from the Match Factory (Germany).

=== Casting ===
Caleb Landry Jones is cast in the film. Whilst attending the Venice Film Festival to promote the Luc Besson film Dogman in August 2023, he spoke throughout in a Scottish accent. Besson explained that he was method acting for a new role, which The Hollywood Reporter reported was for Harvest. Jones later confirmed to la Repubblica that this was true. In February 2024, Harry Melling, Rosy McEwen, Arinzé Kene, Thalissa Teixeira, and Frank Dillane were revealed to be cast in the film. The cast also includes Stephen McMillan, Gary Maitland and Noor Dillan-Night.

=== Filming ===
Principal photography took place around Oban in Argyll, Scotland. The film was shot on 16mm.

== Distribution ==
The film premiered at the 81st Venice International Film Festival on 3 September 2024, and will also play at the Toronto International Film Festival on 6 September 2024. In October, the film was selected for the MAMI Mumbai Film Festival 2024 under the World Cinema section.

In August 2024, Mubi acquired distribution rights to the film in the United Kingdom, Ireland, Germany, Austria, Benelux and Latin America.

== Reception ==
On the review aggregator website Rotten Tomatoes, 73% of 51 critics' reviews are positive.

Davide Abbatescianni of Cineuropa argued that the film is "imbued with a rather unique bucolic, violent and, at times, surreal atmosphere" but found that the "treatment of the nature versus culture conflict is perhaps not so memorable, and it lacks punch in comparison with more powerful works on the same themes."

== Awards and nominations ==
Award	Year	Category	Nominated work	Result	Ref
Venice Film Festival	2024	Golden Lion	Athina Rachel Tsangari	Nominated	
British Independent Film Awards	2025	Best Production Design	Nathan Parker	Won	
