= Ouro Preto murder case =

2001 murder in Minas Gerais, Brazil

- Location: Ouro Preto, Minas Gerais Brazil
- Date: October 2001
- Attack type: Murder
- Deaths: 1
- Victim: Aline Silveira Soares
- Defender: Luiza Helena Fonseca
- Accused: Edson Aguiar, Cassiano Garcia and Maicon Lopes
- Judge: Ouro Preto forum

The Ouro Preto murder case refers to the murder of the student Aline Silveira Soares, found dead in a cemetery in the city of Ouro Preto, Minas Gerais, Brazil. The case triggered significant national coverage by the Brazilian press at the beginning of 2000s.

== The case ==
In October 2001 Aline Silveira Soares traveled from her hometown Guarapari, in the state of Espírito Santo, to the city of Ouro Preto, a historical city Minas Gerais hills, home of the Federal University of Ouro Preto (UFOP). Apparently, Aline was accompanied by a friend named Liliane, and her cousin Camila Dolabella. They all attended a festival named "Do Doze", a university party that brings together UFOP alumni and other students, and happens every 12 October.

At the dawn of 14 October 2001, Aline was found dead on a grave in the cemetery "Nossa Senhora das Mercês". Her body had signs of 17 stab wounds.

The investigators and the mainstream media claimed that the death was caused by students playing Dungeons & Dragons. The game named Vampire: The Masquerade was temporarily banned by justice in Brazil. The prosecution alleged that Aline was murdered by three residents of the Sonata república (student house), where the young women stayed overnight for the party. They further alleged that the cause of the crime was a role-playing game (RPG), which Aline lost, and as a result was punished with death, more specifically a ritual death according to Satanic precepts.

== The verdict ==
The three people accused of murder were acquitted of the crime on 5 July 2009, after five days of trial.

== Role of the mainstream media and the judiciary system ==
According to Cynthia Semíramis Machado Vianna, PhD in law by Universidade Federal de Minas Gerais (UFMG): the press promoted a campaign of disinformation during the trial, establishing a nonexistent relationship between RPGs (such as D&D) with what some authorities at time supposed to be black magic and satanic rituals linked to the homicide. On 20 December 2004, a Brazilian late news TV program named Jornal da Globo reported on the crime giving national coverage, in which the journalists said that black magic books were found, including a satanic bible, however the video showed only RPG books, leading to an absurd association between the ideas. This "satanic bible" was one of the RPG supplements of Vampire: The Masquerade called Book of Nod, which gathers poetic, fictional texts about a possible biblical origin of vampires.

Still according to Cynthia, the press should have respected the intelligence of the public, as RPG games and players were misrepresented for years, instilling condemnation of the accused and chasing players countrywide. After the acquittal, the same media began to criticize the authorities and fight for the clarification of the crime, questioning the attitude of the investigation authorities. In 2001, when they should have asked such questions, they preferred to treat investigators as masters of truth. Days before the trial, the media bet on the condemnation of the accused; however after absolution, chose to ignore eight years of manipulation and lynching of defendants, shifting the focus of the discussion to the absence of guilty, trying to make the public forget the shameful role that the press had in reporting this case.

Later legal analyses failed to link RPGs and the murder of the student Aline Silveira Soares.

=== Anthropological analysis ===
Anthropologist Ana de Fiori analyzed the circumstances and developed a survey on the behavior of those involved in the trial and how the media approached the case. According to her, the Brazilian press often condemn the accused to the society even before the trial is finalized.

Another issue highlighted in the research concerns the association of RPGs with the death of the victim. Ana attended the final trial and interviewed the case's prosecutor during her investigation; she commented: "many of the allegations were made about the demonic practice of the RPG game, while what should be tried was the evidence linking to the murder."
