= Gospel of Judas (disambiguation) =

Gospel of Judas may refer to:

- Gospel of Judas, a Gnostic gospel, the text of which was partially reconstructed in 2006
- The Gospel According to Judas, a 2007 novel by Jeffrey Archer and Frank Moloney
- The Judas Gospel, a novel by Peter Van Greenaway originally published in 1972
- The Gospel of Judas, a novel by Simon Mawer originally published in 2000
- Judas' Gospel (film), 2025 Italian film
