= Carlos Ortiz =

Carlos Ortíz may refer to:

- Carlos Ortiz (boxer) (1936–2022), Puerto Rican boxer
- Carlos Escobar Ortiz (born 1989), Chilean footballer
- Carlos Ortiz (wrestler) (born 1974), retired wrestler from Cuba
- Carlos Arias Ortiz, Mexican biochemist
- Carlos Ortiz (futsal) (born 1983), Spanish futsal player
- Carlos Ortiz (golfer) (born 1991), Mexican golfer
- Carlos Javier Ortiz (born 1977), American documentary photographer
- Carlos Vieco Ortiz (1900–1979), Colombian musician and composer
