= Crested Butte Film Festival =

- Location: Crested Butte, Colorado USA
- Founded: 2011
- Awards: ACTNow, Best Narrative Feature, Best Documentary Feature, Best Comedy Short, Best Documentary Short, Best Narrative Feature, Audience Choice
- Directors: Scott Robson
- No. of films: 100
- Festival date: September (annually)
- Language: International
- Website: cbfilmfest.org

The Crested Butte Film Festival is a celebration of international films, held annually over four days in the last weekend of September, in Crested Butte, Colorado.

== History ==
Celebrating its 15th anniversary in 2025, the Crested Butte Film Festival (CBFF) was founded in 2011. In February 2025 the CBFF Board of Directors hired long-time Colorado nonprofit and local government leader, Scott Robson as Executive Director. In the years prior to 2010, the Town of Crested Butte previously hosted Reel Fest, a shorts film festival that lasted a decade but was discontinued. The first installment of the Crested Butte Film Festival had an audience of 1,500 or approximately the full-time population of the town. By 2013 the attendance doubled and as of 2025 the Festival regularly draws attendance regionally and from across North America. The Festival is known for year-round programming of film in a funky mountain community which is a both a National Historic Landmark District and Colorado Creative District, and for offering unique opportunities for Festival attendees to meet and interact with filmmakers. The Crested Butte Film Festival also has a reputation for programming a diverse array of short and full-length films during its annual festival which occurs during the peak of the autumn leaf changing season in Colorado (September 24-28, 2025).

== Program ==
Crested Butte Film Festival programs artful, moving, creative and provocative films, in both short and full-length programs. Preference is given to creativity, daring, great storytelling, and bravery. The top selections are awarded to ACTNow, to the best narrative and documentary features, best documentary short, and to those chosen by the audience.

== Awards ==
=== Action and Change Together (ACTNow) ===
Awarded to a nonprofit organization linked to a call-to-action documentary.

ACTNow
| Year | Winning film | Director(s) | Country |
|---|---|---|---|
| 2012 | Bidder 70 | Beth Cage; George Cage | United States |
| 2013 | Blood Brother | Steve Hoover | United States |
| 2014 | Virunga | Orlando von Einsiedel | United Kingdom |
| 2015 | Racing Extinction | Louie Psihoyos | United States |
| 2016 | Newtown | Kim Snyder | United States |
| 2017 | Bending the Arc | Kief Davidson; Pedro Kos | United States |
| 2017 | A Plastic Ocean | Craig Leeson | United Kingdom |
| 2019 | Santuario | Pilar Timpane; Christine Delp | United States |
| 2020 | Mossville: When; Great Trees Fall | Alexander Glustrom | United States |
| 2024 | Mr.Cato | Ryan Ross | United States |

=== Juried Awards ===
Director Ed Zwick (right) interviews Jesse Zwick (left) for About Alex.

Courtney Marsh, of Chau, Beyond the Lines, is interviewed at a filmmaker's function.

David Zellner discusses his film Kumiko, the Treasure Hunter at an audience talkback.

Best Narrative Feature
| Year | Winning film | Director(s) | Country |
|---|---|---|---|
| 2013 | De rouille et d'os (Rust and Bone) | Jacques Audiard | France |
| 2014 | The One I Love | Charlie McDowell | United States |
| 2015 | Kumiko, the Treasure Hunter | Nathan Zellner; David Zellner | United States |
| 2016 | The Lobster | Yorgos Lanthimos | Greece/ Ireland |
| 2017 | A Ghost Story | David Lowery | United States |
| 2019 | Parasite | Bong Joon-ho | Republic of Korea |
| 2020 | Bait | Mark Jenkin | United Kingdom |
| 2024 | Los Frikis | Michael Schwartz & Tyler Nilson | United States |

Best Documentary Feature
| Year | Winning film | Director(s) | Country |
|---|---|---|---|
| 2012 | Bidder 70 | Beth Cage; George Cage | United States |
| 2013 | Chasing Ice | Jeff Orlowski | United States |
| 2014 | The Overnighters | Jesse Moss | United States |
| 2015 | Almost Holy (Crocodile Gennadiy) | Steve Hoover | United States |
| 2016 | LoveTrue | Alma Har'el | United States/ Israel |
| 2017 | Whose Streets? | Sabaah Folayan; Damon Davis | United States |
| 2019 | Storm the Gates | Daniele Anastasion; Catherine Yrisarri; Josie Swantek | United States |
| 2020 | Us Kids | Kim Snyder | United States |
| 2024 | CHAMPIONS OF THE GOLDEN VALLEY | Ben Sturgulewski & Katie Sternholm | United States |

Best Comedy Short
| Year | Winning film | Director(s) | Country |
|---|---|---|---|
| 2017 | Immaculate; Misconception | Michael Geoghegan | United Kingdom |
| 2019 | Hot Dog | Alma Buddecke; Marleen Valin | Germany |
| 2020 | Olla | Ariane Labed | United States |
| 2024 | Cheat Meal | Drew Bierut | United States |

Best Documentary Short
| Year | Winning film | Director(s) | Country |
|---|---|---|---|
| 2015 | Our Curse | Tomasz Śliwiński | Poland |
| 2016 | We All We Got | Carlos Javier Ortiz | United States |
| 2017 | Woody's Order | Ann Talman | United States |
| 2019 | All Inclusive | Corina Schwingruber-Ilić | Switzerland |
| 2020 | Huntsville Station | Jamie Meltzer and Chris Filippone | United States |
| 2024 | #WAY_AURELIO | Alan Rexroth | Germany |

Best Narrative Short
| Year | Winning film | Director(s) | Country |
|---|---|---|---|
| 2015 | La Hija | Jazmín Rada | Spain |
| 2016 | Situational | Scott Simonsen; Alyssa Skoller | United States |
| 2016 | Stutterer | Benjamin Cleary | Ireland |
| 2017 | American Paradise | Joe Talbot | United States |
| 2019 | Moon and the Night | Erin Lau | United States |
| 2020 | Monstruo Dios (Monster God) | Agustina San Martín | Argentina |
| 2024 | Cheat Meal | Drew Bierut | United States |

=== Audience Choice ===
Audience Choice
| Year | Winning film | Director(s) | Country |
|---|---|---|---|
| 2012 | Kumaré | Vikram Gandhi | United States |
| 2013 | Blood Brother | Steve Hoover | United States |
| 2014 | About Alex | Jessie Zwick | United States |
| 2015 | Unbranded | Phillip Baribeau | United States |
| 2016 | Jim: The James Foley Story | Brian Oakes | United States |
| 2017 | Band Aid | Zoe Lister Jones | United States |
| 2019 | Peanut Butter Falcon | Tyler Nilson; Michael Schwartz | United States |
| 2020 | High Country | Conor Hagen | United States |
| 2024 | CHAMPIONS OF THE GOLDEN VALLEY | Ben Sturgulewski & Katie Sternholm | United States |

== Other awards ==
=== Special Jury Prize ===
- 2012 – Alexander Gaeta, "Outstanding achievement, directorial debut"; Shoot the Moon
- 2014 – Martin Rath, "Outstanding achievement, breakthrough filmmaker"; Written in Ink and Arena
- 2015 – Yana Novikova (Яна Новикова), "Outstanding achievement, debut performance in a feature film"; The Tribe (Плем'я)
- 2016 – Leonor Caraballo, Mattero Norzi, Abou Farman, and Adella Ladjevardi, "Artistic accomplishment"; Icaros: A Vision
- 2016 – Ashley Valenzuela, "Filmmaker to watch"; Warm Waves
- 2017 – David Byars, "Excellence in filmmaking"; No Man's Land
- 2017 – Nancy Liu, "Filmmaker to watch"; Angeltown
- 2017 – Dana Romanoff, "Embodying the spirit of activism in the arts"; Storytelling and the Spirit of Activism in Cinema
- 2019 – Nancy Dionne, "Achievement in social impact and activism"; All I See is the Future
- 2019 – Zack Gottsagen, "Outstanding debut performance"
- 2020 – Mohammad Rasoulof, "Courage in filmmaking"
- 2020 – Ashley Williams, "Outstanding achievement, directorial debut"

== See also ==
- List of film festivals
