= Athina Rachel Tsangari =

Greek filmmaker (born 1966)

- Αθηνά Ραχήλ Τσαγγάρη
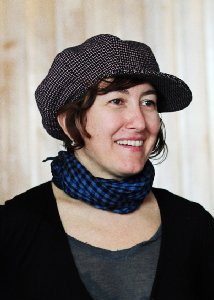
- Born: April 2, 1966 (age 60); Athens, Greece
- Occupations: Film director, screenwriter, film producer, projection designer
- Years active: 1993–present
- Movement: Greek weird wave

Athina Rachel Tsangari (Greek: Αθηνά Ραχήλ Τσαγγάρη, IPA: [aθiˈna raˈçil t͡saŋˈɡari]) (born April 2, 1966) is a Greek filmmaker. Her most notable works include her feature films, The Slow Business of Going (2000), Attenberg (2010) and Chevalier (2015) as well as the co-production of Yorgos Lanthimos' films Kinetta (2005), Dogtooth (2009), and Alps (2011). In her versatile work for cinema, she has also founded and been director of the Cinematexas International Short Film Festival. In 2014–2015, she was invited to Harvard University's Visual and Environmental Studies department as a visiting lecturer on art, film, and visual studies.

== Life and career ==
Tsangari was born in Athens, Greece. She holds a university degree from the Faculty of Philosophy of the Aristotle University of Thessaloniki, and two post-graduate diplomas: an MA in performance studies from New York University's Tisch School of the Arts, and an MFA in film directing from the University of Texas at Austin.

Her first experience working in film was with a small role in Richard Linklater's 1991 film Slacker. Since then, Tsangari has assumed multiple roles within the film industry.

=== Film director ===
Her debut short film, Fit (1994), was created for her NYU studies and was shortlisted for the Annual Student Academy Awards.

For her MFA thesis, she created her first feature-length film, The Slow Business of Going (2000), a lo-fi/sci-fi road movie, shot in multiple formats (8mm, 16mm, mini-DV and 35 stills) in hotel rooms of nine cities around the world and then transferred the final cut of the film to 35mm. The film premiered at the Thessaloniki International Film Festival in 2000 and won best film at the New York Underground Film Festival in 2002. The film was described by Domitila Bedel in Senses of Cinema as "a permanent erection for the eye". The 2002 Village Voice Critics Poll listed it as one of the year's “best first films” and it now belongs to MoMA's permanent film collection.

Her second feature-length film, Attenberg (2010), premiered in the main competition at the 67th Venice International Film Festival, where it won the Coppa Volpi Award for Best Actress for its protagonist, Ariane Labed. The film was Greece's official entry for Best Foreign Language Film at the 84th Academy Awards.

Her short film The Capsule (2012), commissioned by the Deste Foundation for Contemporary Art, was screened at the Locarno, Toronto and Sundance film festivals to critical acclaim.

In 2013, she was one of seventy directors invited by the Venice Film Festival to participate in the project Venezia 70 - Future Reloaded, for which she made the short science fiction film 24 Frames Per Century (2013).

Also in 2013, she also created a fundraising film for the Benaki Museum, the pioneering museum of Greek heritage, narrated by Willem Dafoe.

In 2015, her third feature-length film Chevalier (2015) was released — a buddy comedy set on a yacht in the Aegean Sea — premiered at the Locarno Film Festival. It won the Best Film prize in official competition at the BFI-London Film Festival 2015. It also received a Best Actor prize for its all-male ensemble cast, and a Jury Special Mention for directing, from the Sarajevo IFF. It had its North American premiere at the Toronto IFF, followed by the New York Film Festival to critical acclaim. The film was Greece's official entry for Best Foreign Language Film at the 89th Academy Awards.

Tsangari's directed a film adaptation of Jim Crace's novel Harvest in 2024.

=== TV director ===
Tsangari directed two episodes of the Canal+/ ZDF/ Netflix historical drama series Borgia.

Her most recent TV work includes the film direction of the BBC Two TV series, Trigonometry. The TV series premiered at the “Berlinale Series” section of Berlinale in 2020.

=== Film producer ===
In 2005, Tsangari founded Haos Film, a production and post-production studio based in Athens. Her producing credits include three films directed by Yorgos Lanthimos: Kinetta (2005), Dogtooth (2009), as an associate producer, and Alps (2011). She is a co-producer on Richard Linklater's Before Midnight (the third installment in the Before trilogy, shot in Messenia, Greece), where she also appeared in the role of Ariadni.

Tsangari's film project Duncharon was awarded the ARTE France Cinéma Award for best project at the International Film Festival Rotterdam CineMart 2012.

=== Film festival work ===
In 1995, Tsangari founded and became the artistic director of the Cinematexas International Short Film Festival, a film festival for experimental work which ran until 2006.

She also served as a creative advisor at the Sundance Feature Film Program Directing Lab and at the Sundance Istanbul and Jordan screenwriter labs.

In 2013, she was a member of the jury at the 63rd Berlin International Film Festival.

In 2017, she was on the World Dramatic Jury at the Sundance Film Festival and on the Cinéfondation and Short Films Jury at the Cannes Film Festival.

In 2019, she was on the Platform Prize jury at the Toronto International Film Festival

In July 2026, Tsangari was appointed the jury member at the 32nd Sarajevo Film Festival for Competition Programme – Feature Film.

=== Projection designer ===
Tsangari served as the projection designer and video director on the creative team headed by Dimitris Papaioannou that designed the opening and closing ceremonies of the 2004 Summer Olympics in Athens.

She also designed the stage projections for the dance theatre work "2" by Dimitris Papaioannou in 2007.

In 2008, she designed the video displays and projections for "A Greek Ceremony" - the Beijing Capital Museum Exhibit on the opening and closing ceremonies of the 2004 Summer Olympics.

In 2009, she created "Reflections", a series of large-scale projections commissioned for the opening of the new Acropolis Museum in Athens.

== Filmography ==
=== Feature films ===
Director

- The Slow Business of Going (2000)
- Attenberg (2010)
- Chevalier (2015)
- Harvest (2024)

Screenwriter

- Attenberg (2010)
- Chevalier (2015), co-written with Efthymis Filippou

Producer

- The Slow Business of Going (2000)
- Kinetta (2005), directed by Yorgos Lanthimos
- Palestine Blues (2006), directed by Nida Sinnokrot
- Dogtooth (2007), directed by Yorgos Lanthimos, associate producer
- Lovers of Hate (2010), directed by Bryan Poyser, executive producer
- Attenberg (2010)
- Alps (2011), directed by Yorgos Lanthimos
- Pearblossom Hwy (2012), directed by Mike Ott
- Before Midnight (2013), directed by Richard Linklater, co-producer
- Lake Los Angeles (2014), directed by Mike Ott, executive producer
- Petting Zoo (2015), directed by Micah Magee, co-producer
- Fireflies (2018), directed by Bani Khoshnoudi, co-producer

Actress

- Slacker as Cousin from Greece (credited as Rachel Reinhardt)
- Before Midnight as Ariadni

=== Shorts ===
- On Infection (1993), writer, director
- Fit (1994), writer, director, editor
- Fit #2 (1995), writer, director
- Plant #1 (1996), writer, director
- Anticipation™ (1996), co-directed with Nida Sinnokrot and Kenny Strickland
- Pleasureland (2001), executive producer
- The Wind Squeezes Glass Leaves (2002), animation, director
- Funky Beep (2007), music video for K.Bhta, director
- Marina № 5 / 20:04–21:10 UTC+8 / 31° 10' N 121° 28' E (2008), director
- The Capsule (2012), co-writer, director
- 24 Frames per Century (2013) (segment of Venice 70 - Future Reloaded), co-writer, director
- The Benaki Museum (2013), narrated by Willem Dafoe, director, writer
- Sandy Beach (2016), producer
- After Before (2016), documentary short, director, producer
- Strands (2019) (segment of 30/30 Vision: 3 Decades of Strand Releasing) writer, director

=== Television ===
- Borgia (TV series), director
- Trigonometry (BBC Two series), director

== Projection design ==
- Opening and Closing Ceremonies of the Athens 2004 Olympic Games (2004), projection designer and video director
- 2 (2007), stage projection designer
- A Greek Ceremony - Beijing Capital Museum Exhibit (2008), projection designer and video director
- Reflections - Opening Ceremony of the New Acropolis Museum (2009), concept, director, projection designer
