= Nicholas Simpson =

English musician and lawyer (born 1958)

Nicholas Simpson is an English composer, conductor, violinist, guitarist and singer-songwriter. He also practised law briefly in the 1990s.

Born in Manchester to a Quaker family, Simpson began violin lessons at the age of seven and, an academic prodigy, won scholarships to Chetham's School of Music and Ackworth School in West Yorkshire. He won a free scholarship to Manchester Grammar School, one of only a handful awarded each year. He studied law at Nottingham University. After performing for 10 years in the 1980s as a guitarist (in rock bands including Idiot Rouge and 23 Jewels) he began a four year composition and conducting course at Trinity College of Music with John Tavener. While there he won the Chappell Prize for composition and the Ricordi Prize for conducting. His first string quartet was given by the Roth Quartet at the Purcell Room in 1987 while he was still a student, as part of the Park Lane Group's South Bank Series.

Practicing in London as a criminal lawyer during the 1990s, Simpson moved back to Manchester in 1998 to become a full time composer and conductor. He has been Music Director of the Halifax Symphony Orchestra and of the Gorton Philharmonic Orchestra, associate conductor of the Huddersfield Philharmonic, co-founder and music director of the Athenean Ensemble in Manchester, and has guest conducted many other orchestras.

Simpson has released two albums as a solo singer songwriter. His classical works include three symphonies, piano and violin concertos, the oratorio Recreation, two string quartets, and the opera Quarantine, based on the novel by Jim Crace. In 2005 his Symphony No. 2 was recorded by the BBC Philharmonic Orchestra and broadcast on BBC Radio 3. His clarinet quartet Mardale Changes (recorded by the Fell Clarinet Quartet) refers to the bells heard from the now flooded and sunken Mardale Church. Remembered Music, for string quartet with soprano, sets a text by one of his teacher John Tavener's friends, the poet Kathleen Raine. The Violin Concerto, first performed by Rachel Stonham and the Athenean Ensemble in Manchester in 2024, has been recorded with Caroline Pether as soloist. It was inspired by Scottish bagpiping and fiddle traditions learned from his Scottish father.

== Selected Works ==
- Absence of Clouds, orchestra
- Altitudes for clarinet and piano
- Bachianas Mancuniensis, five pieces for piano (also orchestral version)
- Blighty, for orchestra
- Cold Epiphany for clarinet, cello and piano
- Fastness, soprano saxophone and strings (2015)
- Flourish, orchestra (also version for flute and harp)
- Four Reasons Why Jazz is Rubbish, for wind quintet
- He Was Despised: Variations on a Theme by Handel, for strings (2009)
- In My Love's House, orchestra with soprano soloist
- Little Suite for strings
- Mardale Changes (2005, for the Fell Clarinet Quartet)
- Piano Concerto (2010)
- Recreation, oratorio (2004)
- Remembered Music, for string quartet and soprano, words Kathleen Raine (1988)
- Reversions, for alto saxophone (or clarinet) and piano
- Seven Stones from Gleann Feithisidh, unaccompanied violin
- So Many Summers, five songs for flute, clarinet, violin, double bass, piano and baritone soloist, words Norman MacCaig
- String Quartet No. 1 in C major (1994)
- String Quartet No. 2 in G minor (2014)
- Symphony No. 1
- Symphony No. 2 (2005)
- Symphony No. 3
- Three Scottish Departures, orchestra
- Violin Concerto (2024)
- Violin Sonatine, violin and piano

== Recordings ==
- Knotwork: music for clarinet quartet, Fell Clarinet Quartet, includes Mardale Changes, Delphian DCD34065 (2008)
- Remembered Music, Zelkova Quartet, Charlotte Trepess (soprano), also includes the two string quartets. Stone Music (2019)
- Fastness, Manchester Camerata, includes Bachianas Mancuniensis, He Was Despised, Little Suite, MPR 115 (2023)
- Flourish, includes Absence of Clouds, Flourish, Violin Concerto. Ulysses Arts (2026)

As singer songwriter

- Lashings of Pop (2005)
- Ladder to the Stars, Subtopia Records (2022)
