= Ben Aronson =

American painter

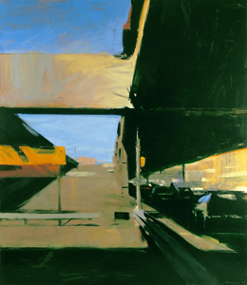
Ben Aronson Closed Ramp, 2010, oil on linen, 84 × 74 inches
- Born: October 4, 1958 (age 67); Boston, Massachusetts
- Education: Boston University
- Known for: Painting, Printmaking
- Movement: Abstract Realism
- Awards: National Academy of Design (2005), Childe Hassam Purchase Prize (American Academy of Arts and Letters (2006)
- Website: www.benaronson.net

Ben Aronson (born October 4, 1958) is an American painter living in Massachusetts. His work is represented by Tibor de Nagy Gallery in New York, Jenkins Johnson Gallery in San Francisco, LewAllen Galleries in Santa Fe, and Alpha Gallery in Boston.

One of the strongest urban scene painters working today, Aronson's painterly urban landscapes combine precise realism with gestural immediacy and Abstract Expressionist energy. His work has become influential among, and emulated by many contemporary cityscape painters. His paintings are included in the permanent collections of more than fifty museums throughout the U.S. and abroad, including the Museum of Fine Arts, Boston, the Virginia Museum of Fine Arts, the De Young Museum in San Francisco, The Museum of Fine Arts, Houston, the Eli and Edythe Broad Art Museum, MI, and the Suzhou Museum, Jiangsu Province, China, as well as numerous private and institutional collections.

"Aronson's luscious impastos depict Manhattan's skyscrapers and concrete canyons, Paris's stately buildings, and San Francisco's skyline with great dexterity", winning acclaim as "...the real deal: the rich physicality of oil paint married to the mutable physics of perception".

In recent years his cityscapes have included contemporary social realist themes "...in which Aronson moves the human figure from its lesser role within the larger urban landscape, into a full subject of its own. Echoing his dramatically lighted single object still lifes, the solitary figures have now taken their place on stage with equal poignancy." (Images/Nighthawks Series) Exhibits at the Tibor de Nagy Gallery, NYC ("Risk and Reward", 2010) and the Ogunquit Museum of American Art, Maine ("Aronson to Aronson", 2011) revealed a new emphasis on social realism in a series of paintings with Wall Street themes exploring the contemporary world of big business. His "... scenes of the New York Stock Exchange floor in particular reveal one of the most energized and sophisticated brushes in the country. His high-contrast tones, boldly thick paint and slashing marks perfectly mirror the fast-moving, high-powered and high-tech world."

Donald Kuspit, professor of art history and philosophy (Stony Brook University, Cornell) observes: "whatever social narrative is conveyed by Aronson's pictures, they are all exquisitely painted and emotionally haunting. Aronson is a social realist, like Edward Hopper—but he's dealing with a different [our current] social reality".

== Biography ==
Ben Aronson was born in Boston and grew up in Sudbury, Massachusetts.

From early childhood he was immersed in the creative environment of his parents and their friends among professional artists, art dealers, writers, musicians, composers, and actors. He interned at a Boston architectural firm while in high school and considered pursuing architecture at Princeton and Yale. Ultimately deciding on fine art as his path of choice, he enrolled at the School of Fine Arts at Boston University where he earned his BFA and MFA in painting (1976–1982) studying under Philip Guston, James Weeks, David Aronson, Reed Kay, and John Wilson.

Traveled to Europe in 1978 to study collections in Greece, Paris, the Netherlands, Spain, and Italy. Taught fine art at Beaver Country Day School, a private high school in Chestnut Hill, MA from 1983 to 1990. In 1990, he left teaching for work as an architectural illustrator which won him a prestigious international award from the American Society of Architectural Perspectivists in 1991. From 1995 to 2007 he was invited yearly to lecture and teach in a Drawing Seminar for architecture students at the Harvard Graduate School of Design.

In the years since 1990 his work began to appear frequently in group and solo exhibitions at galleries in California, New York City, Chicago and New England. He has presented over 20 solo exhibitions at respected galleries across the U.S., including Tibor de Nagy Gallery, New York (2005, 2008, 2010), Jenkins Johnson Gallery, San Francisco (2004, 2007, 2008, 2011), Alpha Gallery, Boston (2000, 2002, 2006, 2009). He was elected into the National Academy of Design in New York City in 2004.

Aronson shares a family tradition in the arts. His father, David Aronson, was one of a major group of Boston painters known as the Boston Expressionists which includes Jack Levine, Hyman Bloom, and Karl Zerbe. David Aronson also founded the visual arts department at Boston University in 1955. His paintings and sculptures are represented in numerous major museum collections. His mother, Georgianna Nyman Aronson, was a respected American portrait painter who has produced official portraits of seven of the Justices of the United States Supreme Court.

Ben Aronson’s two sons, Jesse (b. 1984) and Alex (b. 1987) are both pursuing successful careers in the visual arts.

He lives with his wife, Eileen, at their home and studio in Massachusetts.

== Images ==
“Closed Ramp”

Aronson's cityscapes won acclaim as “the real deal: the rich physicality of oil paint married to the mutable physics of perception.”

"The Recollection"

"Aronson's luscious impastos depict Manhattan skyscrapers and concrete canyons, Paris's stately buildings, and San Francisco's skyline with great dexterity. In these cityscapes, he contrasts blurry, impressionistic foregrounds with near-photorealistic distant views. The artist's figurative works are equally deft. In The Recollection (2008), the precise detailing of the fine restaurant in the background opposes the gauziness of the young blond woman whose blue eyes seem lost in reverie."
