= Serge de Beaurecueil =

French Catholic priest (1917–2005)

The Reverend Serge de Beaurecueil OP
- De Beaurecueil in 1965
- Church: Catholic Church

Orders
- Ordination: 19 March 1943 by Emmanuel Célestin Suhard

Personal details
- Born: Serge Emmanuel Marie de Laugier de Beaurecueil; 28 August 1917 Paris, France
- Died: 2 March 2005 (aged 87) Bois-Guillaume, Seine-Maritime, France
- Residence: Kabul, Afghanistan
- Occupation: Orientalist, missionary
- Education: Le Saulchoir, University of Paris

Serge Emmanuel Marie de Laugier de Beaurecueil OP (28 August 1917 – 2 March 2005) was a French Dominican friar, Islamicist, and missionary in Afghanistan. He was a founding member of the Dominican Institute for Oriental Studies and a scholar of Abdullah Ansari, an eleventh century Afghan Sufi saint. As a missionary in Afghanistan, he cared for poor children and orphans at his home in Kabul until being forced into exile during the Soviet–Afghan War.

From 1963 to 1983, he served as the only Catholic priest in Afghanistan.

== Life ==
=== Early life ===
Serge Emmanuel Marie de Laugier de Beaurecueil was born 28 August 1917. He was the first of three children born to an aristocratic family in Paris at his grandmother's home at 42 Rue Copernic. His father, Pierre Laugier de Beaurecueil, was a cavalry officer, and his mother, Roberte de Quelen, was an heiress to a family of dragomans who had settled in Istanbul. His family was of Provençal, Breton, Corsican, Polish, and Jewish descent. He experienced what he would later describe as a "wretched childhood" as a result of his parents divorcing. To cope, he imagined he was a prince from India in exile and longed to go on a journey far away from his surroundings. From his childhood, he desired never to marry and took an early interest in a religious vocation as a result.

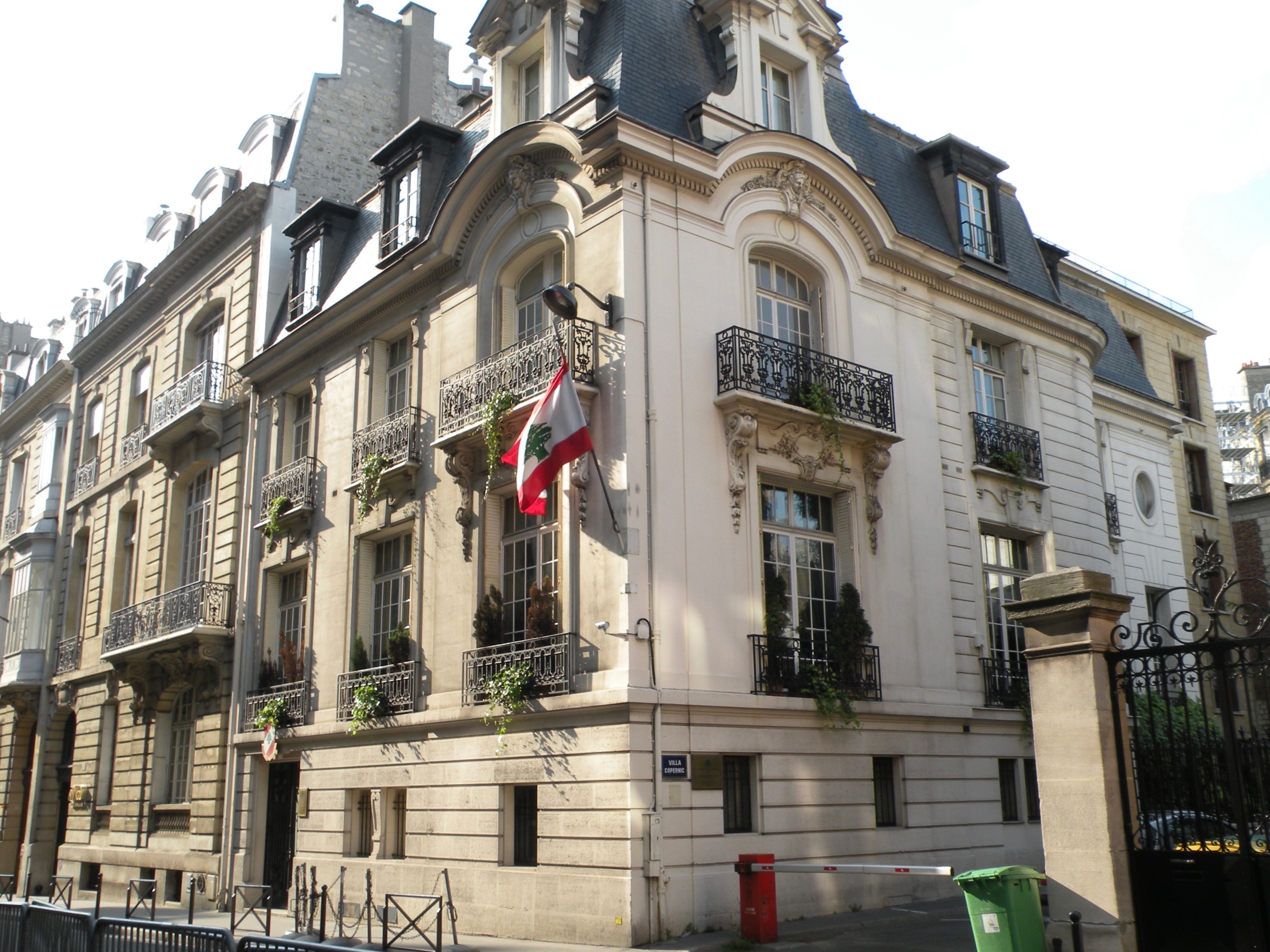
Birthplace of Serge de Beaurecueil, today the Lebanese embassy.

De Beaurecueil was a descendant of Philippe Antoine d'Ornano and Marie Walewska, as well as the Oppenheim family.

=== Religious formation ===
De Beaurecueil was initially attracted to the Carmelites. However, a priest encouraged him to pursue a vocation with the Dominicans, and after finding himself "mesmerized" by a visit to a Dominican priory, he opted to join them instead. Despite some opposition from his father, he entered the novitiate at Amiens on 14 October 1935. He received the religious name Marie-Joseph.

De Beaurecueil began studies at Le Saulchoir in 1936. Having previously studied Arabic in Paris, he was assigned by Marie-Dominique Chenu to an Islamic studies unit Chenu was forming with Georges Chehata Anawati and Jacques Jomier. This Islamic studies unit was to be sent to Egypt to found a Dominican priory whose mission was the study of Islamic civilization without the intention to proselytize. In addition, De Beaurecueil received training in theology and philosophy according to the emerging nouvelle théologie (a school of Catholic theology emphasizing retrieval of the Church Fathers for modern theology), of which Le Saulchoir was an intellectual center. His professors included Yves Congar, Pierre Mandonnet, and Antonin Sertillanges. As a seminarian, he was introduced to Louis Massignon who encouraged him to study Sufism, the mystical tradition of Islam. De Beaurecueil was called to military service in 1939 and was stationed in Jounieh for eight months before returning to France for two months of domestic military service before being discharged in June 1940 and returning to Le Saulchoir. He completed the equivalent of a doctorate in theology in 1943 and a licentiate in Arabic literature that same year. He ordained to the priesthood on 19 March 1943 by Emmanuel Célestin Suhard.

=== Cairo ===
After his ordination, De Beaurecueil arrived in Cairo as a founding member of the Dominican Institute for Oriental Studies, rejoining Jacques Jomier and Georges Anawati. As Georges Anawati had opted to study classical Islamic philosophy and Jacques Jomier to study contemporary Islamic thought, De Beaurecueil embarked on a program of study of Islamic mysticism. Osman Yahya, a scholar of Ibn Arabi, suggested he study Ibn Ata Allah al-Iskandari or Abdullah Ansari. Louis Massignon counseled him in a letter to study Ansari, as the Jesuit Paul Nwiya was already researching Ibn Ata Allah. To facilitate this, De Beaurecueil began studying Persian under Cyprian Rice, a British Dominican friar who had recently arrived in Cairo, and paleography under Pierre Nautin, a French Dominican friar who specialized in patristics.

During his seventeen years in Cairo, De Beaurecueil mastered the Persian language and paleography and began translating and publishing editions of Abdullah Ansari. He also participated in Christian-Muslim dialogue sessions sponsored by Mary Kahil and befriended notable Egyptian intellectuals such as Taha Hussein and Naguib Mahfouz. Nevertheless, he struggled at times from the stress of community life and research. He opted to take on pastoral work including chaplaincy at a Catholic high school, where he celebrated Mass in the Coptic Rite, chaplaincy to a Catholic scouting troop, and a chaplaincy for factory workers. He wore a tarboush and mastered colloquial Arabic, seeking to connect to locals in a way that other friars had not.

=== Kabul ===
De Beaurecueil first traveled to Afghanistan in 1955, with assistance from Évariste Lévi-Provençal in securing a visa. At this point, his scholarship on Abdullah Ansari had become well known among Afghan scholars, who were in turn interested in receiving him as a visiting researcher. He arrived in Kabul in October 1955. With support from the Afghan government, he began a mission of collecting manuscripts and was given access to museum collections and state archives including the private library of Mohammad Zahir Shah. He then traveled to Herat with Ravan A. G. Farhâdi to make pilgrimage to the mausoleum of Abdullah Ansari. He returned to Egypt after this and did not return to Kabul until 1962. After returning to Cairo, De Beaurecueil wrote a biography of Abdullah Ansari which was published in Beirut in 1965 under the title Khwâdja 'Abdullāh Ansārī (396-481/1006-1089), mystique hanbalite.

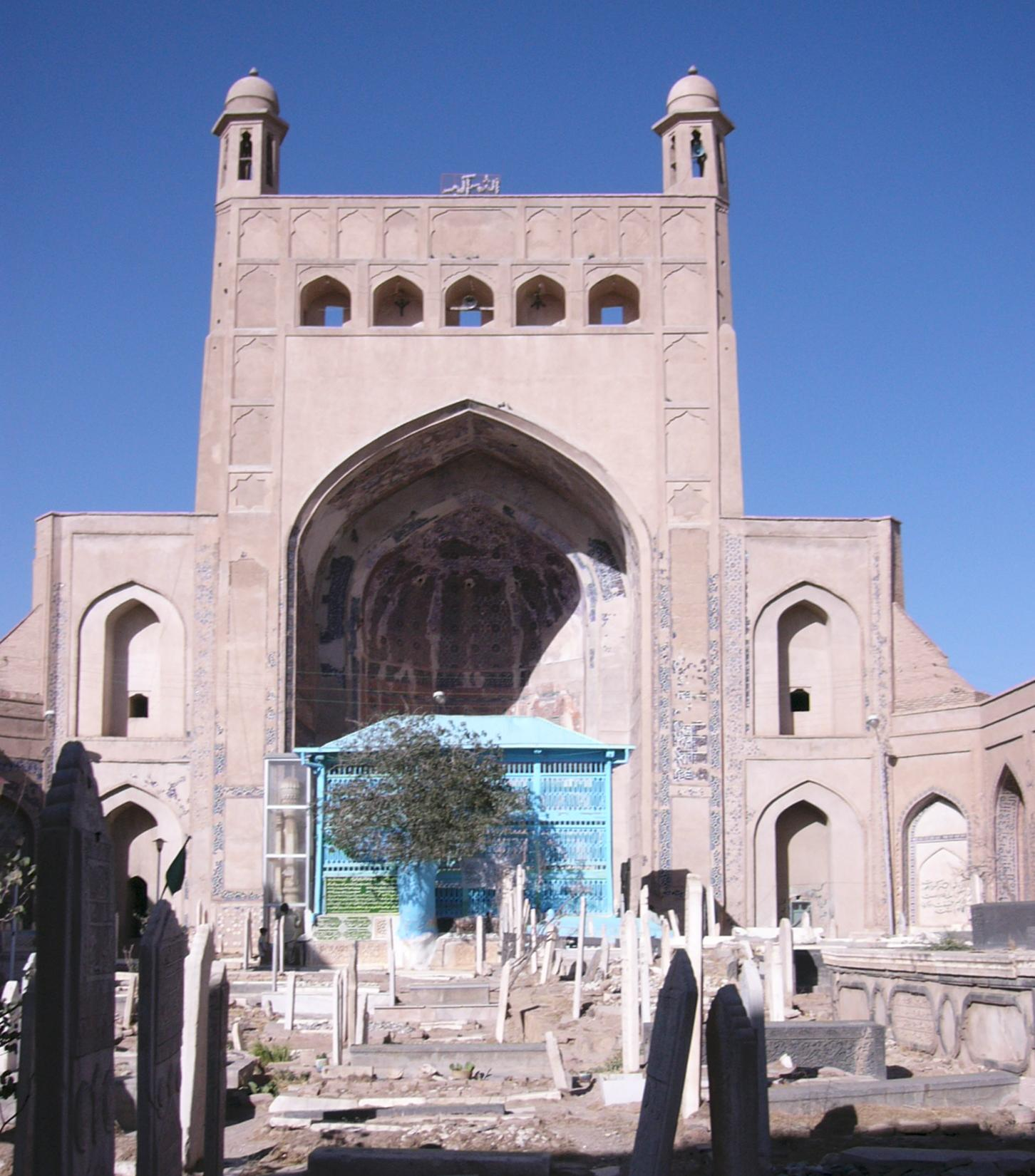
Tomb of Abdullah Ansari, Herat.

In 1962, he was invited to a conference in Kabul commemorating the ninth lunar centennial of the death of Abdullah Ansari. After the conference, he was invited by the minister of education to work as a professor at the University of Kabul. He received permission from his religious superiors to accept this offer and moved to Afghanistan in 1963 as a professor of paleography and the history of Sufism. De Beaurecueil moved into a house in Shahr-e Naw founded by the Little Sisters of Jesus. He named his residence "Maison Saint-Abraham" and celebrated the Byzantine liturgy in a private chapel. In addition to his university position, he took a job as a teacher at Esteqlal High School. He resigned from his professorship in 1968 to focus on his passion for working with children. In 1971, he earned a PhD from the Sorbonne but had abandoned academia entirely at this point exclusively to care for the poor and orphaned children to whom he had opened his home.

Leaving academia while still residing in Afghanistan as a Catholic priest, De Beaurecueil modeled his life on the "hidden life" of Jesus in Nazareth. Because he did not live in a Catholic religious community nor could he engage in the traditional ministry of a Catholic priest, De Beaurecueil had to reimagine life as a priest according to what was possible in Afghanistan. He practiced a spirituality of intercessory prayer for religious others in the style of Louis Massignon. He cooperated with Muslims and largely secular French expatriates in charitable works. He performed his ministry conscious of the Qur'an's remarks about priests and monks, which at times praises them for kindness and mercy but also at times condemns them for excessive wealth and abuse of power. Minlib Dallh compares this period to the lives of the Catholic missionary monks Charles de Foucauld and Bede Griffiths. He sought to inculturate the Catholic liturgy in light of Afghan and Islamic culture. This proved to be a challenge as he was often the only Christian present at his liturgies, celebrated primarily for Muslim children who did not understand Christian worship nor could participate in the Eucharist. As part of his experiment in inculturation, De Beaurecueil celebrated the Byzantine liturgy, incorporated the Eucharistic prayer of the Didache and Persian poetry into the liturgy, wore Afghan street clothes instead of traditional vestments, and translated Agnus Dei as "Lion of God."

=== Later life and death ===
De Beaurecueil was expelled from Afghanistan in 1983 by Soviet authorities on charges of espionage. He moved to Brussels where he served as the prior of the Dominican house for three years before returning to Paris. During his time in Paris, he published a memoir in 1985 entitled Un chrétien en Afghanistan as well as Mes enfants de Kaboul in 1992. He additionally published editions of Abdullah Ansari. He remained homesick for Afghanistan and received the opportunity for a final visit to Afghanistan in 2003. He returned to the Dominican Institute for Oriental Studies before his death in 2005 in Bois-Guillaume.

== Legacy ==
Afghanistan Demain is a non-governmental organization founded to carry on De Beaurecueil's legacy of caring for poor children in Afghanistan.

== Bibliography ==
=== Works on Abdullah Ansari ===
- Commentaire du Livre des étapes, (Les étapes des itinérants vers Dieu), IFAO 1954
- Livre des étapes, critical edition, 1962.
- Khwâdja 'Abdullāh Ansārī (396-481/1006-1089), mystique hanbalite, Beirut, 1965.
- Abdallâh Ansârî, Chemin de Dieu. Trois traités spirituels (Les cent terrains - Les étapes des itinérants vers Dieu - Les déficiences des demeures), translated from Persian and Arabic, presented and edited by Serge de Beaurecueil, Arles, Sinbad / Actes Sud, 1997.
- Abdallâh Ansârî, Cris du Cœur (Munâjât), translated from Persian, presented and annotated by Serge de Beaurecueil, preface by Mohammad Ali Amir-Moezzi, Paris, Éditions du Cerf, « Patrimoines Islam » series, 2010.

=== Works on Afghanistan ===
- Nous avons partagé le pain et le sel, Éditions du Cerf, 1965.
- Prêtre des non-chrétiens, Éditions du Cerf, 1968.
- Mes enfants de Kaboul, Éditions J.-C. Lattès, 1983.
- Un chrétien en Afghanistan, Éditions du Cerf, 2001.
- Je crois en l'Étoile du matin, Éditions du Cerf, 2005.
