= Isolda Dychauk =

Russian-German actress (born 1993)

- Born: Isolda Dychauk; 4 February 1993 (age 33); Surgut, Russia
- Occupation: Actress
- Years active: 2007–present
- Spouse: Mike Ott

Isolda Dychauk-Ott (born 4 February 1993) is a German actress of Russian descent.

== Career ==
Isolda Dychauk was born in 1993 in Surgut (West Siberia) and moved to Berlin in 2002 with her mother. In addition to her native language Russian, she learned to speak German accent-free. In 2003, she was admitted to the Berlin-based acting school Next Generation. Her camera debut was in 2004 with the short film Gimme your shoes, directed by Anika Wangard, which was shown in October 2009 at the Vienna International Film Festival.

In 2007, she appeared in the family drama Das Geheimnis meiner Schwester, where she acted next to Marianne Sägebrecht. In 2007, she acquired the role of Paula in the TV movie Nichts ist Vergessen. In the following years, she appeared in several television series, including Polizeiruf 110, Tatort, and The Old Fox.

In 2008, she landed her first film role as Bianca in Nana Neuls youth drama Mein Freund aus Faro. In 2010, she played Gretchen in the movie Faust, directed by Alexander Sokurov. In September 2011, this screen adaptation of the tragedy by Johann Wolfgang von Goethe won the Golden Lion at the Venice Film Festival.

In the European co-production television series of Borgia, Dychauk plays the role of Lucrezia, whose father was Rodrigo Borgia—later Pope Alexander VI—played by the American actor John Doman. Shooting of the first season took place between October 2010 and May 2011 in Prague's Barrandov Studios. A second season has subsequently been aired, and the third, and final season was aired and put on Netflix in the fall of 2014.

In 2016, it was announced that Dychauk would make her first appearance at the Salzburg Festival in 2017 in a production by Athina Rachel Tsangari (Lulu).

== Filmography/Television ==
- 2004: Gimme your shoes
- 2007: Das Geheimnis meiner Schwester
- 2007: Nichts ist vergessen
- 2007: Polizeiruf 110, episode "Gefährliches Vertrauen"
- 2007–2010: Unsere Farm in Irland, five episodes
- 2008: Mein Freund aus Faro
- 2008: Tatort, episode "Borowski und das Mädchen im Moor"
- 2008: Alles was recht ist
- 2008: Späte Rache – Eine Familie wehrt sich
- 2008: The Old Fox, episode "Tot und vergessen"
- 2008: Stille Post
- 2009: 30 Tage Angst
- 2009: KRIMI.DE, episode "Filmriss"
- 2010: Tatort, episode "Kaltes Herz"
- 2010: The Old Fox, episode "Rettungslos"
- 2011: Polizeiruf 110, episode "Leiser Zorn"
- 2011: Großstadtrevier, episode "Große Erwartungen"
- 2011: Faust
- 2011–2014: Borgia (TV series)
- 2012: The Capsule (short film)
- 2013: Bastards
- 2013: Guten Tag (short film)
- 2015: Cologne P.D. – episode "Partitur eines Todes"
- 2016: Boris Without Béatrice
- 2016: Cape Town (TV series)
- 2017: Cordelia (The K. Sisterhood) (short film)
- 2018–19: Berlin Station (TV series), season 3
- 2020: The Book of Vision
- 2022: City on a Hill (TV series), season 3
- 2023: The Magnet Man
- 2024: McVeigh

== Personal life ==
Dychauk is married to American director and screenwriter Mike Ott.
