= Olla (film) =

French short film

- Directed by: Ariane Labed
- Starring: Romanna Lobach; Grégoire Tachnakian
- Edited by: Yorgos Mavropsaridis
- Release date: 19 May 2019 (Cannes Directors' Fortnight)
- Running time: 28 minutes
- Countries: France; United Kingdom
- Language: French

Olla is a 2019 French short film written and directed by Ariane Labed, her directorial debut.

== Synopsis ==
It follows Olla, a woman from Eastern Europe, who responds to an advertisement on a dating site. She then moves in with Pierre, who lives with his elderly mother in a suburb of France.

== Filming ==
The filming of Olla took place primarily in Nevers, France.

== Critical response ==
Kennith Rosario of The Hindu appreciated the film for depicting the power play in an unusual relationship. In his review for The Guardian, Phill Hoad writes about Labed's humorous inflections devolving into frenzy and violence in a controlled manner, indicating potential for her future full-length works.

== Awards and nominations ==
=== Nominations ===
- Canne's Directors' Fortnight
- BFI London Film Festival
- Telluride Film Festival
- Sundance Film Festival
- Clermont-Ferrand International Short Film Festival

=== Awards ===
- Grand Prize, SACD Best Fiction Award, and Students' Price at Clermont-Ferrand International Short Film Festival
- Best Comedy Short, Crested Butte Film Festival
- Louis le Prince Prize for Best Short Film at Leeds International Film Festival
- Best Actress for Romana Lobach at Aguilar Film Festival
- Best Film & SACD prize at Clermont-Ferrand International Short Film Festival
