= Being Dead =

1999 novel by Jim Crace

- First edition
- Author: Jim Crace
- Language: English
- Publisher: Viking Press
- Publication date: 1999
- Publication place: United Kingdom
- Media type: Print (Hardback & Paperback)
- ISBN: 0-14-023975-8
- OCLC: 43338733

Being Dead is a novel by the English writer Jim Crace, published in 1999.

Its principal characters are married zoologists Joseph and Celice and their daughter Syl. The story tells of how Joseph and Celice, on a day trip to the dunes where they met as students, are murdered by an opportunistic thief. Their bodies lie undiscovered for several days, during the course of which their estranged daughter is made aware of their disappearance and, eventually, discovery. The novel dwells heavily on the themes of bodily decomposition and filial bereavement.

== Critical reception ==
The novel was highly praised upon publication and won the 2000 National Book Critics Circle Award for Fiction. The New York Times selected it as an Editor's Choice of the Year.

The Washington Post called Crace "an extravagantly gifted writer" and praised his book as "a rare interleaving of writerly panache and common human feeling."

== Film ==
The film version, directed by John Meyers, stars Linus Roache, Kathryn Erbe, Gavin Peretti, and Elizabeth Marvel.
