= Carlos Javier Ortiz =

American director, cinematographer and photographer

- Born: Carlos Javier Ortiz; San Juan, Puerto Rico
- Known for: Visual artist, director, cinematographer and photographer
- Movement: Experimental, social realism

Carlos Javier Ortiz is an American director, cinematographer and photographer.

Ortiz works with photography, experimental documentary films and text, projection projects and specializes in long-term documentaries that focus on urban life, gun violence, race, poverty and marginalized communities. Ortiz collaborates with his subjects by asking them to share their personal narratives and testimonials. His projects are collected and published and is exhibited internationally in galleries and museums.

His work is in collections including the Schomburg Center for Research in Black Culture in New York City, the Museum of Contemporary Photography, the George Eastman Museum in Rochester, New York and the Library of Congress in D.C.. His work has appeared in: The Atlantic, The New York Times, Newsweek, The Washington Post, Time, NPR, The Guardian, and Stern. He was a staff photographer for "Chicago In The Year 2000", a yearlong project. In 2016 his film We All We Got won best documentary short at the 2016 Crested Butte Film Festival.

== Life and work ==
He lives between Chicago and Oakland, California. Oritz is an adjunct lecturer at UC Berkeley and is represented by Jenkins Johnson Gallery, (San Francisco/New York).

Ortiz is working on a cross-cultural youth violence project, which documents adolescents in Chicago, and Guatemala. In 2011 he received the Open Society Institute Audience Engagement Grant.

== Awards ==
- 2006 The Chicago Community Arts Assistance Grant
- 2009 Robert F. Kennedy Center for Justice and Human Rights: Photography Award
- 2011 The Chicago Community Arts Assistance Grant
- 2011 Richard H. Driehaus Foundation Arts & Culture
- 2011 Open Society Foundation Audience Engagement Grant
- 2012 The California Endowment Fellowship
- 2013 Artist Fellowship Illinois Arts Council
- 2013 Pulitzer Center Grant
- 2015 BMRC Fellow The University of Chicago

== Publications ==
- We All We Got. New York, NY: Red Hook Editions, 2014. ISBN 978-1-941703-00-7.

== Collections ==
- 2004 Detroit Institute of Arts Detroit, MI
- 2008 Museum of Contemporary Photography Chicago, IL
- 2008 Library of Congress Washington, D.C.
- 2013 International Museum of Photography Rochester, NY
- 2014 Permanent Collection Open Society Foundation New York, NY
- 2014 Worcester Art Museum in Massachusetts Worcester, MA
- 2015 Schomburg Center for Research in Black Culture New York, NY

== Solo exhibitions ==
- 2009 Violent Realities, Gun Violence in the Americas Gage Gallery, Chicago, IL
- 2011 Too Young to Die Loyola University Chicago, School of Communication Gallery, Chicago, IL
- 2012 Migrant Workers Leica Gallery, Cologne, Germany
- 2014 David Weinberg Gallery, Chicago, IL
- 2015 We All We Got, Bronx Documentary Center

== Group exhibitions ==
- 2012 50 States and the Poor, American Poverty Project Group Exhibition
- 2012 Occupy This Katzen Arts Center, American University Museum, Washington, D.C.
- 2013 Fields/Contre-Champs, Group Exhibition GwinZegal, France
- 2014 Guns Without Borders Worcester Art Museum, Worcester, MA
