= Trigonometry (TV series) =

British comedy-drama television series

- Written by: Duncan Macmillan; Effie Woods
- Directed by: Athina Rachel Tsangari; Stella Corradi
- Starring: Gary Carr; Ariane Labed; Thalissa Teixeira
- Composer: Alexis Grapsas
- Country of origin: United Kingdom
- Original language: English
- No. of episodes: 8

Production
- Executive producers: Tessa Ross; Juliette Howell; Tommy Bulfin; Athina Rachel Tsangari; Duncan Macmillan; Effie Woods
- Producer: Imogen Cooper
- Cinematography: Sean Price Williams; Ashley Connor
- Editors: Morten Højbjerg; Matt Johnson; Richard Graham
- Production company: House Productions

Original release
- Network: BBC Two; HBO Max
- Release: 15 March – 26 April 2020

Trigonometry is a British comedy-drama television series developed by House Productions. The first two episodes were previewed at the 2019 BFI London Film Festival. It was then showcased at the 2020 Berlinale before premiering on BBC Two on 15 March 2020. It was available that summer to stream on HBO Max.

== Premise ==
In the late 2010s, London couple Gemma and Kieran are forced to take in a lodger to make ends meet. They take in Ray and the polyamorous triad grows closer than they had expected.

== Cast ==
- Gary Carr as Kieran
- Ariane Labed as Ray
- Thalissa Teixeira as Gemma
- Rebecca Humphries as Caroline
- Isabella Laughland as Moira
- Ambreen Razia as Naima
- Anne Consigny as Mathilde
- Ann Akinjirin as Dee

== Production ==
=== Development ===
It was announced in October 2017 that Piers Wenger and Peter Hollands of the BBC had commissioned Trigonometry, an 8 30-minute episode drama produced by House Productions and written by Duncan Macmillan and Effie Woods. Executive producers included Tessa Ross and Juliette Howell of House and Tommy Bulfin of the BBC.

Greek director Athina Rachel Tsangari signed on in January 2019 to direct the first five episodes, whilst Stella Corradi directed the last three.

=== Filming ===
Principal photography took place over four months at Ealing Studios in West London. A nearby two-storey pub was used for cafe scenes. The character of Ray is a swimmer; Aquabatix were consulted for this part and helped to coach the actresses, and swimming scenes were filmed at the Crystal Palace National Sports Centre.

== Release ==
BBC Studios were in charge of international distribution. Trigonometry was among the BBC programmes licensed by HBO Max in summer 2019. A first trailer was revealed on 10 February 2020. The first two episodes premiered back-to-back on BBC Two on 15 March followed by weekly airings.

It aired on CBC Gem in Canada.

== Reception ==
Rotten Tomatoes reported an approval rating of 89% based on 9 reviews with an average rating of 8.3/10.
