= Attenberg =

2010 film

- Film poster
- Directed by: Athina Rachel Tsangari
- Written by: Athina Rachel Tsangari
- Produced by: Maria Hatzakou; Yorgos Lanthimos; Iraklis Mavroidis; Athina Rachel Tsangari; Angelos Venetis
- Starring: Ariane Labed; Vangelis Mourikis; Evangelia Randou; Yorgos Lanthimos
- Cinematography: Thimios Bakatakis
- Edited by: Matt Johnson; Sandrine Cheyrol
- Release dates: 8 September 2010 (Venice); 9 December 2010 (Greece)
- Running time: 93 minutes
- Country: Greece
- Language: Greek

Attenberg is a 2010 Greek drama film, written and directed by Athina Rachel Tsangari. The film was nominated for the Golden Lion at the 67th Venice International Film Festival and Ariane Labed won the Volpi Cup for the Best Actress. It was filmed in the town of Aspra Spitia, in the Greek region of Boeotia. The film was selected as the Greek entry for the Best Foreign Language Film at the 84th Academy Awards, but it did not make the final shortlist.

== Plot ==
A sexually inexperienced 23-year-old woman named Marina lives with her terminally ill architect father Spyros in an industrial Greek town by the sea, where she works at the local steel mill. Unable to relate to the people she meets, she lives her life through the wildlife documentaries of British broadcaster David Attenborough, the music of American band Suicide, and the sex education lessons given to her by her friend Bella.

Despite her sexual inexperience, Marina's relationships with her father and Bella show warmth and thought. Spyros, contemplative as he approaches death, shares with her how he believes that "man has designed ruins with mathematical accuracy", referring to the destiny of most architecture. But then cynically, he reflects that "We (Greece) went from sheep to bulldozers".

When a stranger comes to town, an engineer who begins a work course at the steel mill, Marina has her first sexual relationship with him. She is secretive but shares her experience first with Spyros, and later with Bella. As Spyros comes closer to death, Marina asks Bella to sleep with her father as a favor for the dying man, who has not been with a woman for a long time.

After Spyros eventually meets his demise, Bella and Marina scatter his ashes over the sea.

== Cast ==
- Ariane Labed as Marina
- Vangelis Mourikis as Spyros
- Evangelia Randou as Bella
- Yorgos Lanthimos as the Engineer

== Reception ==
Quentin Tarantino, who was head of the Jury for the 67th Venice International Film Festival, said that the film "grew on us the most, and showed another Greece". Journalist Shane Danielsen called the film "an intellectually rigorous, quietly wrenching Greek drama". Peter Bradshaw characterised the film as "an angular, complex, absorbing and obscurely troubling movie".

== Promotion ==
A promotional picture for the film, where the tongues of two women meet, was censored on Facebook, but Facebook now hosts a profile for the film in which the picture is allowed.

== Awards ==
Event	Category	Nominee	Result
Venice Film Festival	Coppa Volpi for Best Actress	Ariane Labed	Won
Venice Film Festival	Golden Lion	Athina Rachel Tsangari	Nominated
Venice Film Festival	Lina Mangiacapre Award	Athina Rachel Tsangari	Won
Whistler Film Festival	New Voices Award for Best International Feature	Athina Rachel Tsangari	Won
Thessaloniki International Film Festival	Special Jury Award - Silver Alexander	Athina Rachel Tsangari	Won
Angers European First Film Festival	"Mademoiselle Ladubay" Best Actress Prize	Ariane Labed	Won
Mexico National University International Film Festival (FICUNAM)	Silver Puma for Best Director	Athina Rachel Tsangari	Won
Mexico National University International Film Festival (FICUNAM)	Audience Choice Award	Athina Rachel Tsangari	Won
Buenos Aires International Festival of Independent Cinema	Best Director	Athina Rachel Tsangari	Won
International Women's Film Festival	Best Feature Award	Athina Rachel Tsangari	Won
Hellenic Film Academy Awards	Best Actress	Ariane Labed	Won
New Horizons Film Festival	Grand Jury Prize	Athina Rachel Tsangari	Won
Romanian International Film Festival	Best Film Award	Athina Rachel Tsangari	Won
European Parliament Film Prize	LUX Prize	Athina Rachel Tsangari	Runner-up
AFI FEST	Special Jury Prize	Athina Rachel Tsangari	Won

== See also ==
- List of submissions to the 84th Academy Awards for Best Foreign Language Film
- List of Greek submissions for the Academy Award for Best Foreign Language Film
