= Thalissa Teixeira =

Actress

- Born: Thalissa Teixeira; 1992/1993; Bradford, West Yorkshire, England
- Education: Royal Welsh College of Music & Drama
- Occupation: Actress
- Years active: 2014–present

Thalissa Teixeira (/təˈliːsə teɪˈʃeɪdə/; born 1992/1993) is a British actress and filmmaker. She began her career in theatre, earning an Ian Charleson Award nomination, before breaking out in the BBC miniseries Trigonometry. She was named a 2021 Screen International Star of Tomorrow.

== Early life ==
Teixeira was born in Bradford, West Yorkshire; her mother is British and her father from Salvador in Brazil. She spent her childhood in Vitória, Espírito Santo in Brazil before returning to England with her mother at the age of 8 to live in Chalfont St Peter, Buckinghamshire where she joined a local theatre group called Through the Wardrobe. She went on to train at the Royal Welsh College of Music & Drama, graduating in 2014.

== Filmography ==
=== Film ===
Year	Title	Role	Notes
2016	Billionaire Ransom	Paloma Nava	
2017	Yerma	Des	National Theatre Live
2018	Julie	Kristina	National Theatre Live
2019	A Family Affair	Lola	Short film
2019	Hobbs & Shaw	Nanny	
2019	Wildfire	Ella	Short film
2019	Exit Eve	Eve	Short film
2020	We Met Before		Short film; Directed, wrote, produced
2024	Harvest	Mistress Beldam	Sixteen Films
2026	Supergirl	Mareck Vran	

=== Television ===
Year	Title	Role	Notes
2016	The Musketeers	Sylvie	Series 3; 9 episodes
2017	Midsomer Murders	Jane Everard	1 episode
2017	The Jonah Man	Miv	Television film
2018	Press	Angie	1 episode
2019	One Red Nose and a Wedding	Best Woman	Comedy special
2020	Baghdad Central	Florida	5 episodes
2020	Trigonometry	Gemma	Miniseries
2020	Two Weeks to Live	Thompson	Miniseries
2021	Too Close	Vanessa "Ness" Jones	Miniseries
2021	Anne Boleyn	Madge Shelton	Miniseries
2021	Ragdoll	DI Emily Baxter	Miniseries
2024	Alice & Jack	Rachel	Miniseries

== Stage ==
Year	Title	Role	Notes
2014	Electra	Chorus	Old Vic, London
2015	The Changeling	Diaphanta	Sam Wanamaker Playhouse, London
2015	The Broken Heart	Euphrania	Sam Wanamaker Playhouse, London
2016	BU21	Thalissa	Theatre503, London
2016	The Night Watch	Vivian	Royal Exchange, Manchester
2016–2017	Yerma	Des	Royal National Theatre/Young Vic/Park Avenue Armory
2017	Othello	Emilia	Sam Wanamaker Playhouse, London
2017	The Unknown Island		Gate Theatre, London
2018	Julie	Kristina	Royal National Theatre, London
2019	Dear Elizabeth		Gate Theatre, London
2019	Blood Wedding	Moon	Young Vic, London
2020	Women Beware Women	Bianca	Sam Wanamaker Playhouse, London
2022	Dr Semmelweis	Maria Semmelweis	Bristol Old Vic, London
2023	Julius Caesar	Brutus	Royal Shakespeare Company
2024	The Taming of the Shrew	Katherina	Shakespeare's Globe
2026	A Doll's House	Kristine Linde	Almeida Theatre

== Awards and nominations ==
Year	Award	Category	Work	Result	Ref.
2015	Ian Charleson Awards		Electra	Nominated	
2021	Carmarthen Bay Film Festival	Poetic Short Film	We Met Before (with AK McCallum)	Nominated	
2022	Underwire Film Festival	Best Actress	We Met Before (Short film)	Won	

== Audio ==
- Sappho in Fragments – BBC Radio 4
- Doctor Who: Defender of the Earth "The Opacity Factor" Jenel Kilum’bu / Saggy
- Doctor Who: Into the Stars "Break the Ice" Dr. Lenni Fisk
- In Flux – BBC Radio 3
- Electra – BBC Radio 4
