= The Gift of Stones =

1988 Book by Jim Crace

- First edition cover
- Author: Jim Crace
- Publisher: Secker & Warburg
- Publication date: 1988

The Gift of Stones is a 1988 novel by British author Jim Crace. The novel, written in poetic language, takes place at the end of the Neolithic period, as the introduction of bronze tools disrupts the established order. It is narrated by the village storyteller and his "daughter".

== Plot summary ==
As a boy, the storyteller lost an arm and became an outcast to the villagers who rely heavily on their stonemasonry skills. The boy leaves the confines of the village, in order to seek a role for himself, and discovers his adeptness at telling stories.

The storyteller returns to the village, but most of his time is spent acting as a protector for a widow and her child, who had also been forced out of the village, and live two days' walk away. Periodically, he returns to the village charged with new stories to tell.

He based an amputation scene on his father's experience with osteomyelitis—"His left arm was withered between his elbow and his shoulder. It was pitted with holes and weeping with pus for most of my childhood," Crace stated in an interview with The Paris Review.

== Themes ==
The novel deals with the nature of truth, fiction, and storytelling. The reader is often presented with variations of the narrative and invited to judge which, if any, to accept as reality. Like other novels by Crace, it also deals with social change and the effects of revolutionary new technology and as such could be seen as sympathising with the victims of our modern post-industrial age.

Crace has said that the novel acts as a metaphor for "Thatcherite Britain".
