= The Capsule =

2012 film by Athina Rachel Tsangari

- Directed by: Athina Rachel Tsangari
- Starring: Ariane Labed; Isolda Dychauk; Clémence Poésy
- Release date: 2012
- Country: Greece
- Language: French

The Capsule is a 2012 Greek short drama film directed by Athina Rachel Tsangari and starring Ariane Labed, Isolda Dychauk, Clémence Poésy, and Aurora Marion. Aleksandra Waliszewska is co-writer of the film. The spoken language is French. The film was shot in Hydra. The film was nominated for the Short Film Grand Jury Prize at the Sundance Film Festival.

== Plot ==
Seven girls, a mansion perched on a Cycladic rock, a cycle of lessons on discipline, desire and demise-infinitely.
