= Harvest (Crace novel) =

2013 novel by Jim Crace

- Author: Jim Crace
- Language: English
- Published: 2013
- Publisher: Picador
- Publication place: United Kingdom

Harvest is a 2013 novel by British author Jim Crace. Crace had stated that Harvest would be his final novel, but it wasn't.

Harvest was shortlisted for the 2013 Man Booker Prize, shortlisted for the inaugural Goldsmiths Prize, shortlisted for the Walter Scott Prize (2014), and won the 2013 James Tait Black Memorial Prize and the International Dublin Literary Award in 2015. In 2019, Harvest was ranked 81st on The Guardian's list of the 100 best books of the 21st century.

== Plot summary ==
Harvest tells the story of a remote English village as economic progress disrupts pastoral idyll following an inclosure act. The protagonist, Walter Thirsk, tells the story from his perspective, but in fact is rarely present when the events of the novel take place due to his injury that he sustains at the beginning of the novel.

The story begins with the arrival of some strangers to the bounds of the village. Following the burning of the stables, a scapegoat is required as no-one wants to admit that one of their own was responsible. Hence a mob sets out in order to find evidence to blame these new arrivals. After a brief altercation with the three strangers, they are arrested by Master Kent and chained to the pillory for the week. The woman travelling with them is shaved of her hair, and expected to be submissive to the men of the village.

At their annual festival, a crippled chart maker that Master Kent has hired to map out the village, Phillip Earle (or Mr. Quill as the villagers call him) selects the young Lizzie Carr to be the Gleaning Queen of the festival. The festivities are interrupted by the shaven woman, earning her the nickname "Mistress Beldam" who goes to hide in the woods. Walter's injury makes him unable to work the field so ends up showing Mr. Quill around. He takes a liking to the man and often imagines returning to urban life under Mr. Quill's employ. When they return to the manor they find that the elderly stranger has died in the pillory.

Master Kent's cousin, Edmund Jordan, realises that he has a claim on the land and arrives, intending to change the way of life of the village by building a church, fencing off the area and focusing on shepherding sheep to increase his profits despite the fact the villagers depend upon the leftovers from the harvest to feed themselves. Walter is distressed to find Master Kent seems quite reserved and submissive to Jordan's plans but Mr. Quill is more critical and sceptical, sympathising with the villagers. The night after Jordan and his entourage arrive Master Kent's horse, Willowjack, is murdered. Jordan organises a search of every home in the village and states that the villager found responsible will be hung for their crimes. They eventually find a bloody shawl belonging to the outsider woman but Master Kent claims it belonged to his deceased wife to spare Mistress Beldam from being hunted and fabricates a story about a travelling ruffian stealing it and causing mischief around the village. Several of the villagers tell Jordan's men that the true culprit is Mistress Beldam who they suspect of being a witch.

That night, Mr. Quill befriends the young stranger still in the pillory who is Mistress Beldam's husband. He learns they had to leave their town when it too began focusing on shepherding sheep and no longer had enough food and shelter for all the villagers. Mr. Quill and Walter wait by the pillory in the dark and when Mistress Beldam arrives to bring her husband food and water, Mr. Quill pursues her into the night. Lizzie Carr, Anne Rogers and Kitty Gosse are apprehended by Jordan's men, beaten and interrogated, being forced to confess to being followers of witchcraft. When pressured to say who their leader is, they naturally name an outsider, Mr. Quill.

Lizzie Carr's family attacks Edmund Jordan's groom when he taunts them with a claim that their young daughter will be burnt alive, in the ensuing scuffle someone draws a blade and disfigures his face. Fearing retribution for attacking one of Jordan's men, all the villagers pack up and flee their homes, leaving only Walter behind. The next day Walter is called to the manor for breakfast. With the villagers gone, Edmund Jordan has forgotten all about his accusations of witchcraft and sorcery; the intent was always to rile up the villagers until they left so he could start over. Master Kent later tells Walter that he was able to use his cousin's good mood to negotiate the freedom of the three captured women but in exchange Walter would remain behind to be Jordan's eyes and ears. Walter is left with orders to release Mistress Beldam's husband from the pillory only when his sentence is carried out and then watches alone from atop a hill as Masters Jordan and Kent ride away followed by Jordan's men and the three women.

Walter releases Mistress Beldam's husband from the pillory early in exchange for him helping him plough and sow seeds in the fields as a final act of revenge against Jordan. Realising that his revenge is timid and petty, Walter spends the night getting drunk on ale and eating fairy cap mushrooms he finds in the forest. The next day he comes to his senses in the manor courtyard and realising last night either he or someone else packed his bags for him. He enters the manor, realising that Mistress Beldam and her husband reunited and spent the night sleeping there and have thoroughly wrecked everything in the manor.

Moving up to the attic, he looks out and sees the Beldams. Anything they didn't destroy in the manor they've stolen and loaded into a cart with some stolen oxen. The husband takes an axe to the pillory, destroying it whilst Mistress Beldam goes around the village setting fire to all the houses. Afraid they will set fire to the manor not knowing he's inside, Walter hurries to leave only to notice blood near a chest in the attic, looking it over he finds Mr. Quill's body. His friend has been stabbed to death but whether by Mistress Beldam or Edmund Jordan's men, Walter can't tell and admits he will never know. Heading outside he finds that the Beldams are leaving without having set fire to the manor and so takes it upon himself to finalise their revenge and his own by burning down the manor and cremating Mr. Quill with it.

Walter burns Mr. Quill's maps, the one detailing what the village looked like before the week that ruined it and the one that he made for Jordan's vision of what it should become. Walter keeps only for himself a blank sheet of vellum he made for Mr. Quill, his packed bags and his injuries as he leaves the abandoned and ruined village, seeking out new pastures.

== Film adaption ==
Athina Rachel Tsangari directed a film adaption of the book with Caleb Landry Jones in a leading role.
