= Quarantine (Crace novel) =

Book by Jim Crace

- First edition cover
- Author: Jim Crace
- Language: English
- Genre: Historical novel
- Publisher: Penguin Putnam
- Publication date: 1997
- Publication place: United Kingdom
- Media type: Print (Hardback & Paperback)
- Pages: 242 pp
- ISBN: 0-670-85697-5
- OCLC: 37420821

Quarantine is a novel by Jim Crace. It was the winner of the 1997 Whitbread Novel Award, and was shortlisted for the Booker Prize for Fiction the same year.

== Plot summary ==
Set in the Judean desert, 2000 years ago, it features seven main characters:

- Musa: a greedy trader, who is healed by the 'Galilean'. His subsequent behavior suggests he might be a manifestation of Satan
- Miri: Musa's pregnant wife
- Marta: fasting between dawn and dusk in an attempt to turn her barren womb fertile
- Shim: a young traveller
- Aphas: fasting between dawn and dusk in an attempt to remove the cancer from his abdomen
- Badu: believed to be deaf and mute; good at catching animals
- The Galilean/Gally/Jesus: aiming to fast for 40 days and nights with divine help; plagued by religious/spiritual hallucinations/visions

When Quarantine begins, the trader, Musa, is suffering from a fever in his tent in the open scrubland on the way to Jericho. There, he and his wife Miri are abandoned by their caravan, who believe him to be on the verge of death.

They see a group of four travellers, some distance apart, heading in their direction. The travellers are on their way to find shelter for 40 days and 40 nights – the 'Quarantine' of the title.

At night, a fifth traveller, some distance behind the first four, visits Musa in his tent. The following morning, Musa awakes to find that his fever has broken and his strength is restored. The fifth traveller, it transpires, is the young Jesus, who takes up occupancy of a hard-to-reach cave set in a hillside.

Musa turns the situation to his advantage, convincing the travellers that the lands are his lands, and he is their landlord.

The group try in turns to coax Jesus from his cave. Convinced he is being tested by Satan, Jesus abides by his quarantine, refusing to take food or water.

A series of power struggles ensues, in which Musa asserts his dominance over Aphas, Shim, his wife and eventually by raping Marta during a stormy night, having feigned illness to get her on her own.

Jesus' body is found in the cave, and the group bury him in the water-hole, which Miri had originally dug as Musa's grave.

The next day, with the tent and Miri's loom having been destroyed by the storm, Musa resolves to leave for Jericho (putting his crime behind him). As he picks his way through the devastation of the camp, he sees a figure which he presumes to be Jesus walking away from the scrubland. Miri finds Marta, bloodied and bruised in the wilderness. They all make ready to leave, only to find that the restless Badu has escaped with Musa's goats.

Aphas and Shim set off, with Miri and Marta following behind. En route, the women find the two men's packs abandoned at the side of the path. Seeing Musa approaching behind them, and sensing their opportunity to escape, they flee – making for Marta's home town.

Finally, Musa is travelling across country in a wagon and believes he sees Jesus off in the distance. For a moment, he considers finding the figure to forge an alliance with him, but resolves instead to continue his business and to travel the world telling the tale of the stranger who saved his life in the tent.

== Reception, significance and influence ==
- In her book The Historical Jesus and the Literary Imagination 1860–1920, Jennifer Stevens cites Quarantine as a recent "high" in the history of representations of Jesus in fiction, contrasted with the recent "low" of Jeffrey Archer's novella The Gospel According to Judas.
- An opera based on the novel has been composed by Nicholas Simpson.

== Editions ==
- Quarantine, Penguin Books, (1998) ISBN 0-14-023974-X
