= E. M. Forster Award =

The E. M. Forster Award is a $20,000 award given annually to an Irish or British writer to fund a period of travel in the United States. The award, named after the English novelist E. M. Forster, is administered by the American Academy of Arts and Letters. Academy members nominate authors and winners are selected by a rotating committee.

== Past winners ==
- 1972 – Frank Tuohy
- 1973 – Margaret Drabble
- 1974 – Paul Bailey
- 1975 – Seamus Heaney
- 1976 – Jon Stallworthy
- 1977 – David Cook
- 1979 – Bruce Chatwin
- 1982 – F. T. Prince
- 1984 – Humphrey Carpenter
- 1986 – Julian Barnes
- 1988 – Blake Morrison
- 1989 – A. N. Wilson
- 1990 – Jeanette Winterson
- 1991 – Alan Hollinghurst
- 1992 – Timothy Mo
- 1993 – Sean O'Brien
- 1994 – Janice Galloway
- 1995 – Colm Tóibín
- 1996 – Jim Crace
- 1997 – Glyn Maxwell
- 1998 – Kate Atkinson
- 1999 – Nick Hornby
- 2000 – Carol Ann Duffy
- 2001 – Marina Carr
- 2002 – Helen Simpson
- 2003 – Andrew O'Hagan
- 2004 – Robin Robertson
- 2005 – Dennis O'Driscoll
- 2006 – Geoff Dyer
- 2007 – Jez Butterworth
- 2008 – John Lanchester
- 2009 – Paul Farley
- 2010 – Dan Rhodes
- 2011 – Rachel Seiffert
- 2012 – David Mitchell
- 2013 – Adam Foulds
- 2014 – Sarah Hall
- 2015 – Adam Thirlwell
- 2016 – Sinéad Morrissey
- 2017 – Robert MacFarlane
- 2018 – Jon McGregor
- 2019 – Sally Rooney
- 2020 – Stephen Sexton
- 2022 – Sara Baume
- 2023 – Lucy Caldwell
- 2024 – Cal Flyn
- 2024 – Chetna Maroo
- 2025 – Johny Pitts
- 2026 – Sophie Ratcliffe
