= Karen Jenkins-Johnson =

American art dealer

Karen Jenkins-Johnson is an American art dealer; owner and director of Jenkins Johnson Gallery, a contemporary art gallery with locations in San Francisco and Brooklyn.

== Early life and education ==
Jenkins-Johnson moved to the Bay Area to get her MBA at University of California, Berkeley, studying entrepreneurship.

== Jenkins Johnson Gallery ==
In 1996, Karen Jenkins-Johnson opened Jenkins Johnson Gallery in San Francisco. In 2005, the gallery opened a second space in Chelsea, NYC. The Chelsea space operated until 2014. In 2017, Jenkins Johnson Gallery opened a community oriented project space emphasizing curators and artists of color, Jenkins Johnson Projects in Prospect Lefferts Gardens, Brooklyn.

== Honors ==
Jenkins-Johnson was a Gala Honoree of the Museum of the African Diaspora (MoAD) Afropolitan Ball - 2018.
