= The Gospel According to Judas =

Book by Jeffrey Archer

- First edition (UK)
- Author: Jeffrey Archer and Frank Moloney
- Language: English
- Genre: Historical fiction
- Publisher: Macmillan (UK); St. Martin's Press (US)
- Publication date: 30 March 2007
- Publication place: United Kingdom
- Media type: Print (hardback and paperback)
- Pages: 96 pp (Hardback edition)
- ISBN: 978-0-230-52901-4
- OCLC: 80331785

The Gospel According to Judas is a 2007 novella by Jeffrey Archer and Frank Moloney which presents the events of the New Testament through the eyes of Judas Iscariot.

== Reception and significance ==
In her book The Historical Jesus and the Literary Imagination 1860–1920, Jennifer Stevens cites The Gospel According to Judas as a recent "low" in the history of representations of Jesus in fiction, contrasted with the recent "high" of Jim Crace's novel Quarantine.
