= The Slow Business of Going =

2000 film by Athina Rachel Tsangari

- Poster
- Directed by: Athina Rachel Tsangari
- Written by: Jim Davis; Matthew Johnson; Tasca Shadix; Athina Rachel Tsangari
- Produced by: Matthew Johnson; Athina Rachel Tsangari
- Starring: Lizzie Curry Martinez
- Cinematography: Deborah Eve Lewis
- Release date: November 17, 2000 (Thessaloniki International Film Festival)
- Running time: 101 minutes
- Country: Greece
- Language: English

The Slow Business of Going is a 2000 Greek film directed by Athina Rachel Tsangari. It premiered at the Thessaloniki International Film Festival on 17 November 2000.

== Plot ==
Petra Going (Lizzie Curry Martinez) is a receiver for the Experience Data Agency, which sends her and her fellow receivers out to wander the globe and interact with various characters. The seemingly random interactions are then uploaded into a database where they can later be accessed by users wishing to vicariously inhabit the experiences.

== Production ==
The film was shot over a period of five years, in hotel rooms and other locations in various countries. The script was constantly evolving, with the actors encouraged to improvise and try new things. Tsangari has stated that the making of the film was constantly very playful.

== Cast ==
- Lizzie Curry Martinze as Petra Going
- Maria Tsantsanoglou as Micah
- Gary Price as the gunman
- Kenny Strickland as the tango man
