= Ariane Labed =

French actress and film director (born 1984)

- Αριάν Λαμπέντ
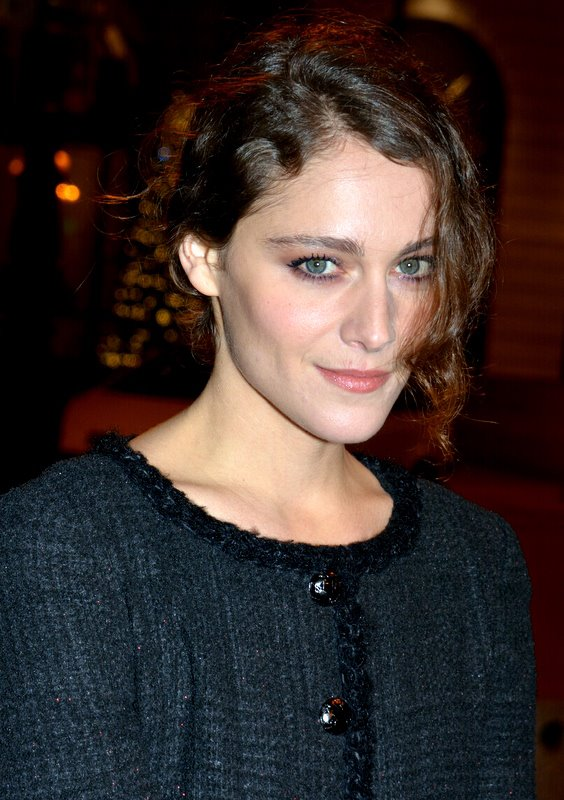
- Labed in 2015
- Born: 8 May 1984 (age 42); Athens, Greece
- Citizenship: Greece; France
- Education: University of Provence
- Occupations: Actress, film director
- Spouse: Yorgos Lanthimos (m. 2013)

Ariane Labed (born 8 May 1984) is a French actress and film director. She is known for her feature film debut in Attenberg, for which she won the Volpi Cup for Best Actress, and appearing in Helen Edmundson's film Mary Magdalene in 2018.

== Early life ==
Born to French parents, Labed spent her first six years in Athens, Greece, then moved to Germany. She moved to France when she was 12 years old. Labed studied theater at the University of Provence (DEUST basic training in theater, Bachelor of Performing Arts and master's degree in dramaturgy and scenic writing). There, she met the Greek director Argyro Chioti, and in 2005, they co-founded the theater group VASISTAS, which has been active in Greece to this day. She has also acted at the National Theater of Greece.

== Career ==
Labed was awarded the Volpi Cup for Best Actress at the 67th Venice International Film Festival for her performance in Attenberg, directed by Athina Rachel Tsangari, which was her debut film. She starred in the films Alps and The Lobster directed by Yorgos Lanthimos. In 2016, she played Maria in Assassin's Creed alongside Michael Fassbender as Aguilar. In 2018, she appeared as Rachel in Helen Edmundson's film Mary Magdalene.

Labed made her directorial debut with September Says based upon a screenplay she wrote, adapted from the novel Sisters by Daisy Johnson, that premiered at the 2024 Cannes Film Festival in the Un Certain Regard section.

== Personal life ==
She has been married to Greek filmmaker Yorgos Lanthimos since 2013. They lived in London from 2011 until 2021, and thereafter primarily in Athens.

In September 2025, both she and Lanthimos signed the open pledge of the Film Workers for Palestine pledging not to work with Israeli film institutions "that are implicated in genocide and apartheid against the Palestinian people."

Ιn February 2026, in a Kathimerini guest editorial, Labed related her experience as witness in a case of rape, strongly criticizing both the process in the Athens court and the comportment of the defense as well as the judge, both of whom, while disputing the victims' statements, invoked dismissively Labed's involvement in feminist agitation as well as in the organization she'd co-founded for the welfare of sexually abused women. In the text, Labed testifies to her own, numerous instances of both "casual" and "serious" sexual abuse suffered during her adolescence, which included two rapes, a past that led her to chronic alcoholism from which she parted in 2021.

== Filmography ==
=== Film ===
| Year | Film | Role | Notes |
|---|---|---|---|
| 2010 | Attenberg | Marina | |
| 2011 | Alps | Gymnast | |
| 2012 | The Capsule | | Short film |
| 2013 | Before Midnight | Anna | |
| 2013 | A Place on Earth | Elena Morin | |
| 2014 | Magic Men | Maria | |
| 2014 | Love Island | Liliane | |
| 2014 | Fidelio: Alice's Odyssey | Alice | |
| 2014 | Intimate Semaphores | Laurel | |
| 2014 | La diagonale du fils | | Short film |
| 2015 | The Forbidden Room | Alicia Warlock / The Chambermaid | |
| 2015 | Prejudice | Caroline | |
| 2015 | The Lobster | The Maid | |
| 2015 | Despite the Night | Hélène | |
| 2016 | Seances | | |
| 2016 | The Stopover | Aurore | |
| 2016 | Assassin's Creed | Maria | |
| 2018 | Mary Magdalene | Rachel | |
| 2019 | The Souvenir | Garance | |
| 2019 | Olla | —N/a | As director, short film |
| 2021 | The Souvenir Part II | Garance | |
| 2022 | Flux Gourmet | Lamina Propria | |
| 2023 | The Vourdalak | Sdenka | |
| 2024 | Swimming Home | Kitti | Premiere at IFFR |
| 2024 | September Says | —N/a | Director, screenplay |
| 2024 | The Brutalist | Adult Zsófia | |
| 2026 | A Girl's Story | Blanche Duchesne | |

=== Television ===
| Year | Title | Role | Channel | Notes |
|---|---|---|---|---|
| 2016 | Black Mirror | Catarina | Netflix | Episode: "Men Against Fire" |
| 2018 | Ad Vitam | Odessa | Arte, Netflix | Miniseries, episodes 5 and 6 |
| 2020 | Trigonometry | Ray | BBC | Miniseries |
| 2021 | L'Opera | Zoe | OCS | 2 seasons |

== Awards and nominations ==
| Year | Award | Category | Nominated work | Result |
|---|---|---|---|---|
| 2010 | 67th Venice International Film Festival | Volpi Cup for Best Actress | Attenberg | Won |
| 2011 | Hellenic Film Academy Awards | Best Actress | Attenberg | Won |
| 2014 | Locarno International Film Festival | Best Actress | Fidelio: Alice's Odyssey | Won |
| 2015 | 20th Lumière Awards | Best Female Revelation | Fidelio: Alice's Odyssey | Nominated |
| 2015 | 40th César Awards | Most Promising Actress | Fidelio: Alice's Odyssey | Nominated |
| 2022 | ACS Awards | Best Actress | L'Opéra | Won |
| 2023 | ACS Awards | Best Performance in a TV Series: 40 minutes | L'Opéra | Nominated |
