= Dominican Institute for Oriental Studies =

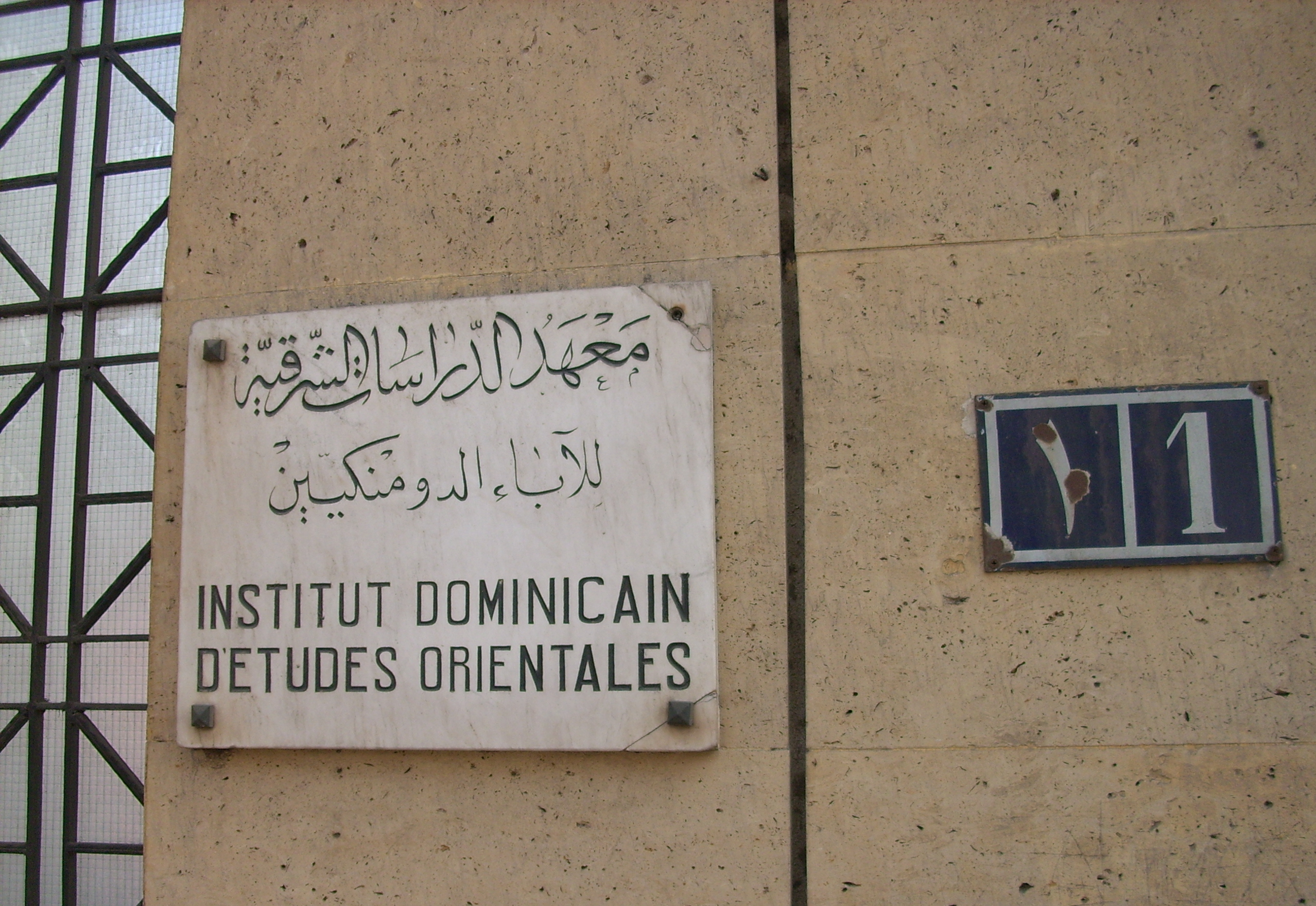
IDEO, Abbasyia Cairo

The Dominican Institute for Oriental Studies (IDEO / Arabic: معهد الدراسات الشرقية للآباء الدومنكيين - Maʿhad ad-Dirāsāt aš-Šarqiyya li-l-Ābāʾ ad-Dūmnikiyyīn) is a center for fundamental research on the sources of Arab-Islamic civilization. Founded in 1953, it is located in Cairo.

== History ==
In Cairo, the Dominican priory is established since 1928. Founded by Antonin Jaussen, o.p. (1871-1962, featured), this priory was meant to be an extension in Egypt of the École Biblique de Jérusalem, and devoted to the study of archeology in Egypt in connection with Biblical studies.

Unfortunately, international events blocked the project. When, in 1937, Dominican friars decided to dedicate themselves to Islamic studies, Cairo seemed to them the ideal location: the prestigious University of al-Azhar is in Cairo; also, Egyptian culture has a prominent place throughout the Arab world.

The intuition of the three founding friars, Georges Anawati, Jacques Jomier and Serge de Beaurecueil, was met by the Vatican's call for religious to take Islam seriously; not to convert Muslims but to make Islam better known and appreciated in its religious and spiritual dimensions. These three started their work after World War II, at the beginning of the 1950's, and founded on March 7, 1953, the Dominican Institute of Oriental Studies (IDEO); today, a well-known research institute mainly dedicated to the sources of Arab and Islamic civilization.

== IDEO today ==
=== Research ===
IDEO remains above all a research center that gathers around a common object of study: the original texts of the first ten centuries of Islam. The period considered is so wide that it offers very different fields of specialization.

Several of the members of the Institute teach at foreign universities and all publish in scholarly journals. They also contribute to the institute's journal, MIDEO (Miscellanies of the Dominican Institute for Oriental Studies), created in 1953 by Georges Anawati, each issue of which brings new works as well as a critical bulletin of editions of Arabic texts. The journal has been directed successively by Georges Anawati, Régis Morelon, Emilio Platti. Since 2016, Emmanuel Pisani is at the head of the publication.

=== Library ===
The library is considered one of the best in the field of Islamic studies. It gathers over 150,000 monographs, and nearly 1,800 journals and periodicals.

The library is intended to cover all disciplines in the field of Islamic studies: Arabic language, Quranic exegesis, theology, law and jurisprudence, history, geography, philosophy, Sufism, science, etc. It offers more than 20,000 classical texts of the Arab-Islamic heritage, as well as scholarship in Arabic or European languages. Many PhD dissertations are also available on site.

=== Inter-religious dialogue and initiation to Islam ===
In addition to its scientific and academic activities, IDEO also plays a role in the field of inter-religious dialogue. In Egypt, the Institute organizes annual summer seminars of initiation to Islam for young Dominicans. It maintains relations with other religious authorities in Cairo and in the Middle East, including al-Azhar University and the Coptic Church.

== Directors ==
- 1953-1984 : Georges Anawati
- 1984-2008 : Régis Morelon
- 2009-2014 : Jean-Jacques Pérennès
- 2014-2020 : Jean Druel
- since 2020 : Emmanuel Pisani
