= Federal University of Ouro Preto =

Brazilian university

Coordinates: 20.7603°S 42.8678°W

- Universidade Federal de Ouro Preto
- Other name: UFOP
- Motto: Cum Mente et Malleo
- Type: Public (Federal)
- Established: August 21, 1839; 186 years ago
- Budget: R$ 362,708,704.00 (2016)
- President: Cláudia Aparecida Marliére de Lima
- Faculty: 1,042
- Undergraduates: 13,658
- Postgraduates: 1,074
- Location: Ouro Preto, Minas Gerais, Brazil
- Website: en.ufop.br

The Federal University of Ouro Preto (Portuguese: Universidade Federal de Ouro Preto, UFOP) is a Brazilian university. It was established on August 21, 1969 in Ouro Preto, Minas Gerais. It resulted from the merger of two century-old higher education institutions: the School of Pharmacy of Ouro Preto, founded in 1839, and the School of Mines of Ouro Preto, founded in 1876. Today is one of the most important universities of Minas Gerais and also Brazil. The university is taken as a reference throughout the country by the School of Pharmacy and Engineering.

== History ==
The Pharmacy School in Ouro Preto was created from the law 140 in 1839. The law was sanctioned by Jacinto Bernardo da Veiga, President of the Province of Minas Gerais. It began the pharmaceutical education in Brazil, which did not exist in colonial times. In 1876, another institution was created in Ouro Preto: The School of Mines. It was officially inaugurated on October 12, 1876, at the request of Emperor Dom Pedro II. Its founder, Claude-Henri Gorceix scientist, described the city of Ouro Preto as the land on which they could follow the almost complete series of metamorphic rocks which form a large part of the Brazilian territory. Moreover, it said that all around the city lent themselves to useful and interesting mineralogical excursions.

On August 21, 1969, the Federal Government has incorporated the two schools located in the city, establishing the Federal University of Ouro Preto as a foundation of public law. Since then, the university has expanded with the creation of new courses in Arts, Humanities, Science and Technology areas.

== Features: centres, schools and institutes ==
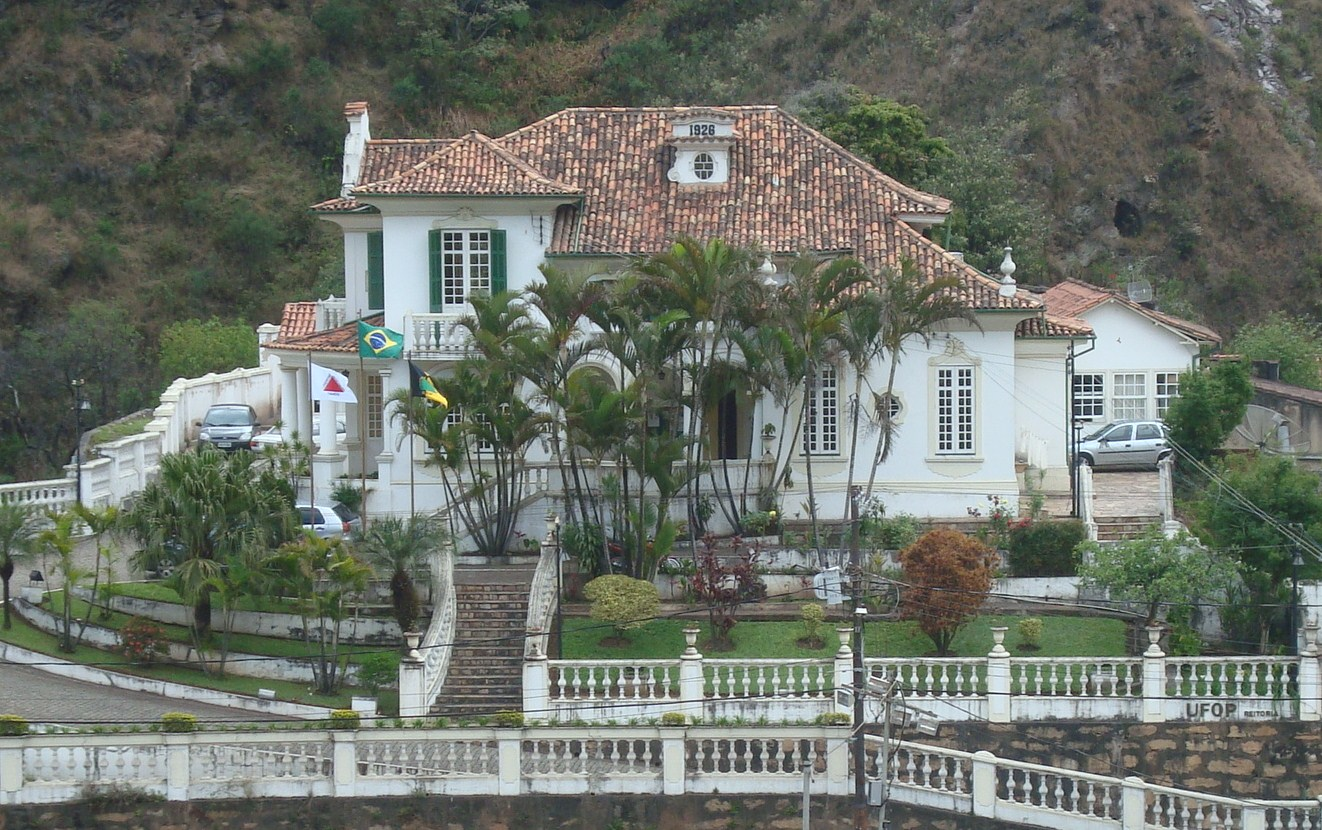
Main administrative building

The university has 11 academic units, distributed as follows in the order of creation:

- Pharmacy School - EF (1839)
  - Department of Clinical Analysis;
  - Department of Clinical Pharmacy;
- School of Mines - EM (1876)
  - Department of Environmental Engineering;
  - Department of Department of Control and Automation;
  - Department of Civil Engineering;
  - Department of Geology;
  - Department of Metallurgical and Materials Engineering;
  - Department of Industrial Engineering, Business and Economics;
  - Department of Architecture and Urbanism;
- Institute of Humanities and Social Sciences - ICHS (1979)
  - Department of Education;
  - Department of History;
  - Department of Languages;
- Instituto of Exact and Biological Sciences - ICEB (1982);
  - Department of Computing;
  - Department of Statistics;
  - Department of Physics;
  - Department of Mathematics;
  - Department of Chemistry;
  - Department of Biological Sciences;
  - Department of Biodiversity, Evolution and Environment;
- Instituto of Philosophy, Arts and Culture - IFAC (1994);
  - Department of Arts;
  - Department of Philosophy;
  - Department of Music;
- School of Nutrition - ENUT (1994);
  - Department of Foods;
  - Department of Clinical and Social Nutrition;
- Centre of Open and Distance Education - CEAD (2003);
- Institute of Applied Social Sciences - ICSA (2008);
  - Department of Economics and Management
  - Department of Social Sciences and Services and Journalism;
- Institute of Exact and Applied Sciences - ICEA (2009);
- Medical School - EMED (2012);
- School of Law, Tourism and Museology - EDTM (2013)
  - Department of Laws;
  - Department of Tourism;
  - Department of Museology;

== Repúblicas ==
UFOP has approximately 10,000 students in the city. Many of them live in communal houses that are somewhat similar to fraternity houses as found in North American colleges. These communal or shared houses are called repúblicas, 66 of which are owned by the university, called repúblicas federais, and 250 are privately owned (repúblicas particulares).

The repúblicas system of Ouro Preto is unique in Brazil. No other university city in the country has exactly the same characteristics of the student lodgings found there. It shares traits with the repúblicas of the Portuguese University of Coimbra, where the tradition originated. Before universities were founded in Brazil, Coimbra was where most of the rich students who could afford an overseas education went to. Each república has its own different history. There are repúblicas in which the freshmen, also known as "bixos" (misspelling of "bichos", Portuguese for "animals"), have to undergo a hazing period, called batalha (battle), before being accepted permanently as residents of the houses. The final choice of the freshmen, called escolha, has to be unanimous among the senior students of the house.

== Undergraduate programs ==
Exact and Applied Sciences

- Computer Science
- Information Systems
- Computer Engineering
- Automation Engineering
- Civil Engineering
- Electrical Engineering
- Geological Engineering
- Mechanical Engineering
- Metallurgical Engineering
- Environmental Engineering
- Mining Engineering
- Industrial Engineering
- Statistics
- Physics
- Mathematics
- Industrial Chemistry
- Chemistry
Life Sciences

- Biological Sciences
- Pharmacy
- Medicine
- Nutrition
- Physical Education
- Food Technology
Humanities and Applied Social Sciences

- Administration
- Architecture
- Performing Arts
- Economy
- Law
- Philosophy
- History
- Journalism
- Languages
- Museology
- Musics
- Pedagogy
- Social Services
- Tourism

== Graduate programs ==
Master's degree (M) and PhD Degree (P)

- Performing Arts - M
- Biotechnology - M/P
- Physics of Materials - M
- Computer Science - M/P
- Chemistry - M
- Biological Sciences - M/P
- Pharmacy - M/P
- Ecology - M
- Economy - M
- Education - M
- Environmental Engineering - M/P
- Civil Engineering - M/P
- Materials Engineering - M/P
- Mining Engineering - M/P
- Philosophy of Art - M
- Crustal Evolution and Natural Resources - M/P
- Geotechnical - M/P
- History - M/P
- Languages - M
- Nutrition - M
- Metallic Construction - M*
- Math Education - M*
- Geotechnical Engineering - M*
- Science Education - M*
- Socioeconomic and Environmental Sustainability - M*
- ------------------------------------------------------------------------------------------------
- -> M* = Professional master's degree Program
- -> Ufop also has about 28 specialization courses (Lato Sensu)

== See also ==
- Brazil University Rankings
- List of federal universities of Brazil
- Universities and Higher Education in Brazil
