= Nida Sinnokrot =

American artist, filmmaker (born 1971)

- Born: 1971 (age 54–55); Jeannette, Pennsylvania, United States
- Education: University of Texas at Austin, Bard College
- Occupations: Visual artist, educator, filmmaker
- Known for: Installation art, film
- Website: www.nidasinnokrot.com

Nida Sinnokrot (born 1971) is an American contemporary visual artist, filmmaker, and educator, of Palestinian ancestry. His work is focused on installation art, and film.

== Early life and education ==
Sinnokrot was born in 1971, in Jeannette, Pennsylvania, United States, and raised in Algeria. His parents were born in Palestine with his father from Hebron, and his mother from Jaffa. Sinnokrot was raised speaking Arabic with an Algerian dialect, English, and French. He relocated back to the United States as an adolescent.

Sinnokrot received a B.A. degree from the University of Texas at Austin; and a M.F.A. degree from Bard College.

== Career ==
In 2002, he won a Rockefeller Media Fellowship Subsequently, he directed the documentary called Palestine Blues (2006), which he described as "a disappearing landscape film" and which won seven awards.

Sinnokrot’s work employs a variety of mediums to transform ordinary objects or actions into sensory experiences that reveal a complexity of form and perception trapped within the mundane. In 2001 he participated the Whitney Museum of American Art Independent Study Program. He is a Rockefeller Foundation Media Arts Fellow (2002) and a Fellow of Akademie Schloss Solitude (2012–2015) and has received support from the Merz Akademie, among others.

Sinnokrot’s recent solo shows include Exquisite Rotation at KIOSK in Ghent (2018) which brought together cinematic installations and sculptural works spanning 20yrs, and Expand Extract Repent Repeat at Carlier | Gebauer in Berlin (2018–2019) which presents recent sculpture, photographs, and installation works that reference flows of global capital, the writing and rewriting of history, and cycles of debt. Sinnokrot’s work is in various public collections including the Sharjah Art Foundation, Sharjah, United Arab Emirates and the Khalid Shoman Foundation, Amman, Jordan.

Sinnokrot is Associate Professor in MIT’s Art, Culture and Technology Program (ACT) in Cambridge, Massachusetts. He has taught at Al-Quds Bard Honors College for Liberal Arts and Sciences in East Jerusalem.
