= Jan Ziarnko =

Jan Ziarnko, also known as Jean Le Grain, Kern and Grano, was a Polish draughtsman and printmaker. He was born in Lviv circa 1575 into a family with German ancestry and he died sometime around 1630, possibly in the same town. He is one of Poland’s most respected graphic artists of the period.

Not much is known about his early life and artistic formation; although in 1596–7 he appears as a member of the Brotherhood of Catholic Painters in Lviv. After training in his native country, he travelled through Italy and Germany to France in about 1598. Ada Palka has suggested that Ziarnko may have come into contact with artists involved in painting anamorphic scenes at this time.

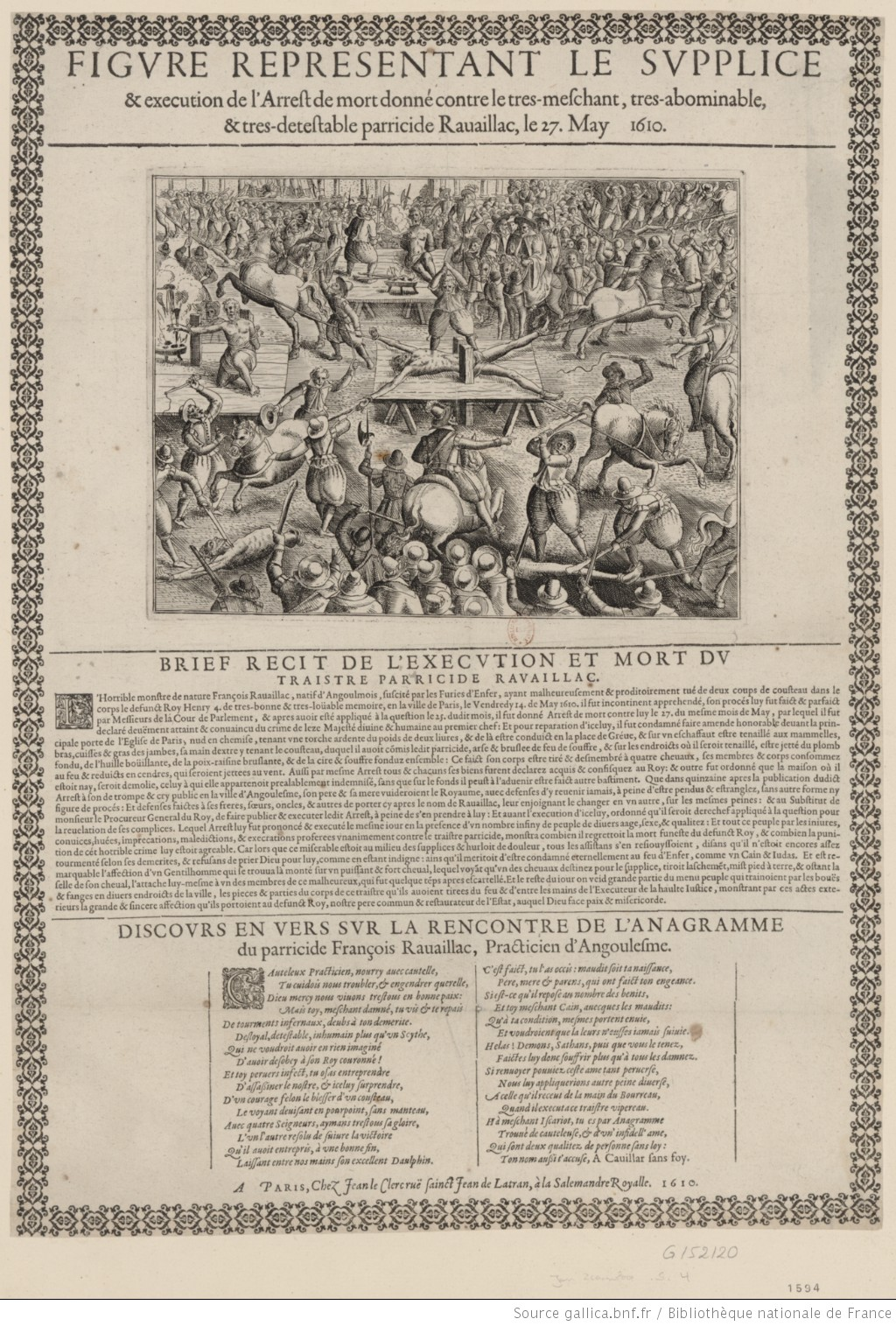
The Death of Ravaillac

Ziarnko spent most of his adult years in Paris, between 1605 and 1629, where the vast majority of his known works were created. These comprise around thirty-five individual prints as well as three extensive print series. Around seventy-five prints made after drawings by Ziarnko also exist. He designed bookplates and images for wall almanacs in addition to depicting aerial views and portraits, as well as historical and contemporary events.

One of his more unusual works is a folding anamorphic etching of 1608. When folded into a cone, this reveals an image of two lovers embracing. This derives from Marcantonio Raimondi’s Modi, a collection of erotic prints that illustrate various sexual positions. The Latin inscription and several vignettes which surround it are also taken from another source in the form of Matthäus Greuter’s The Power of Venus of 1587. However, Ziarnko’s use of a circular grid to create a deformation mesh which produces the anamorphic distortion appears to be highly novel.

Ziarnko’s expertise in perspective is attested to by his treatise of 1619, Perspectivae Stereo Pars Specialis (Three-dimensional Pictorial Perspective, Special Part). This outlines methods for constructing anamorphic images. As such, it played an important role in shaping later literature on the subject, such as Jean-François Niceron’s La Perspective Curieuse of 1638, which was voluminous in seventeenth-century France.

Examples of Ziarnko’s work can now be seen in the Bibliothèque Nationale de France in Paris, the British Museum in London, the Czartoryski Museum in Kraków, and The National Library of Poland in Warsaw (digital version here).
