= Jenkins Johnson Gallery =

- Established: 1996
- Location: San Francisco; Brooklyn (Jenkins Johnson Projects)
- Coordinates: 37.75424°N 122.38938°W
- Type: Art gallery
- Owner: Karen Jenkins-Johnson
- Website: https://www.jenkinsjohnsongallery.com

Jenkins Johnson Gallery is a contemporary art gallery owned and directed by Karen Jenkins-Johnson. The gallery exhibits a spectrum of influential artists from emerging to established. There are 2 gallery spaces: one in San Francisco and a project space in Brooklyn.

== History of the Jenkins Johnson Gallery ==
In 1996, Karen Jenkins-Johnson opened Jenkins Johnson Gallery in San Francisco. In 2005, the gallery opened a second space in Chelsea, NYC. The Chelsea space operated until 2014.

=== Jenkins Johnson Projects ===
In 2017, Jenkins Johnson Gallery opened a community oriented project space emphasizing curators and artists of color - Jenkins Johnson Projects - in Prospect Lefferts Gardens, Brooklyn.
