= Claude-Henri Gorceix =

French mineralogist

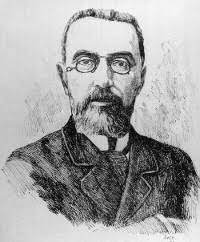
Claude-Henri Gorceix

Claude-Henri Gorceix (October 19, 1842 – 1919) was a French mineralogist born in Saint-Denis-des-Murs, Haute-Vienne.

From 1863 to 1866 he studied at the École Normale Supérieure of Paris, earning a bachelor's degree in physical sciences and mathematics. Later he taught classes at the Lycée d'Angoulême and at the French School at Athens.

In 1876 he founded the Escola de Minas (School of Mines) in Ouro Preto, Brazil, and served as its first director. The Escola de Minas offered classes in mineralogy, geology, physics and chemistry. In 1896 he was tasked by the state of Minas Gerais to help establish agricultural education.

The mineral gorceixite is named in his honor, as is Gorceixia, a genus of flowering plants native to Brazil. In 1887 he won the Prix Delesse from the French Academy of Sciences.

== Selected works ==
- Itinéraire d'un voyage dans les Khassia et le bassin supérieur de Haliacmon, 1872 – Itinerary of a trip to the Khassia and the upper basin of the Haliacmon.
- Aperçu géologique sur l'ile de Cos, 1876 – Geological survey on the island of Kos.
- Minas Géraes, l'un des États-Unis du Brésil, situation, ressources, population, 1891 – Minas Gerais, one of the United States of Brazil; status, resources, population.
- Les ressources minérales du Brésil, leur utilisation, 1908 – The mineral resources of Brazil, their uses.
- Correspondance avec D. Pedro II, empereur du Brésil – Correspondence with Dom Pedro II.
