= Jim Crace =

English novelist, play, short story writer (born 1946)

Jim Crace FRSL
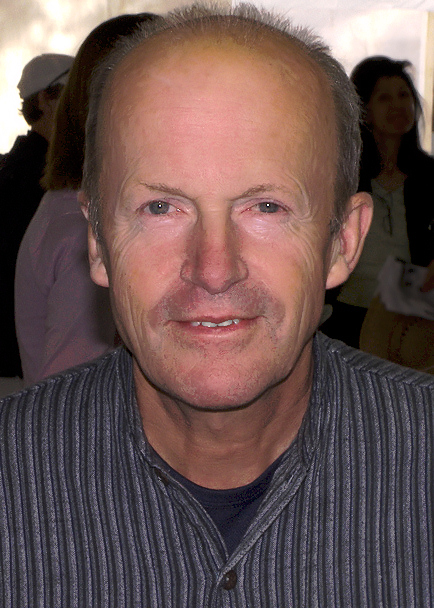
- Crace at the 2009 Texas Book Festival
- Born: James Crace; 1 March 1946 (age 80); St Albans, England
- Occupations: Writer; novelist; playwright; short story writer
- Spouse: Pamela Turton
- Children: 2
- Writing career
- Period: 1974–
- Genres: Realistic fiction, historical fiction
- Notable works: Continent; The Gift of Stones; Arcadia; Signals of Distress; Quarantine; Being Dead; Harvest
- Notable awards: David Higham Prize for Fiction; 1986; Guardian Fiction Prize; 1986; Winifred Holtby Memorial Prize; 1994; American Academy of Arts and Letters E. M. Forster Award; 1996; National Book Critics Circle Award; 1999; James Tait Black Memorial Prize; 2013; Windham–Campbell Literature Prize; 2015; International Dublin Literary Award; 2015
- Website: www.jim-crace.com

James Crace FRSL (born 1 March 1946) is an English novelist, playwright and short story writer. Elected a Fellow of the Royal Society of Literature in 1999, Crace was born in Hertfordshire and has lectured at the University of Texas at Austin. His novels have been translated into 28 languages—including Norwegian, Japanese, Portuguese and Hebrew.

Crace's first novel, Continent, was published in 1986. Signals of Distress won the 1994 Winifred Holtby Memorial Prize. His next novel, Quarantine, won the Whitbread Novel in 1997 and was shortlisted for the Booker Prize of the same year. Being Dead won the National Book Critics Circle Award in 1999. Harvest was shortlisted for the 2013 Booker Prize, won the 2013 James Tait Black Memorial Prize and won the 2015 International Dublin Literary Award.

Crace received the American Academy of Arts and Letters E. M. Forster Award in 1996. He was awarded a Windham–Campbell Literature Prize in 2015.

== Early life ==
Crace was born in 1946 at the neo-classical Hertfordshire country house of Brocket Hall, while it served as a maternity hospital. In 2013, Crace said his father was "a curmudgeonly leftwing atheist who... was open-hearted in the big things and narrow and doctrinaire in every other respect". But he also spoke of his love his father at the same time, describing him as a man who liked such activities as birding, walking, gardening, reading and tennis, with Crace admitting that he had "totally turned into him" as he had aged. An edition of Roget's Thesaurus that his father gave him as a Christmas present when he was 11 Crace retained as a "constant companion, my best possession", throughout his life.

Crace grew up at Enfield, London and attended Enfield Grammar School. There he was involved in the Campaign for Nuclear Disarmament and Keep Left but did not attend to his A-Levels. He ended up at the Birmingham College of Commerce. He joined Voluntary Service Overseas (VSO), and was based in Sudan. A year later he returned to the UK, where he worked for a time at the BBC.

Between 1976 and 1987, Crace worked as a freelance journalist, including for The Sunday Times and the Radio Times, before quitting due an experience at The Sunday Times, where his report on the Broadwater Farm riot did not receive the acclaim of his editor, owing to his unwillingness to describe in sufficient detail the hell-like features of this estate.

== Personal life ==
Having spent many years living in the Moseley area of Birmingham with his wife Pamela Turton, Crace announced when they were 67 years of age that they would be moving to rural Worcestershire, "you're supposed to want to downsize, but we actually want to upsize", he commented. Of Birmingham, he described living there as "politically important to be in a place where the future is being mapped out, rather than the past being replayed, which is what happens if you go to a Cotswolds village".

Crace and Turton have two children, Thomas Charles Crace (born 1981) and the actress Lauren Rose Crace (born 1986), who played Danielle Jones in EastEnders. Crace went on to become a grandfather.

A scientific atheist and modern Darwinist, he is a former member of the British Labour Party, but left in a dispute over its stance on the wars in Afghanistan and Iraq.

== Influences ==
Crace has expressed his admiration for Günter Grass, Italo Calvino and Primo Levi, adding: "Less so Kundera, more so the Latin American magical realists."

== Writing ==
In 1974 Crace published his first work of prose fiction, "Annie, California Plates" in The New Review, and in the next 10 years would write a number of short stories and radio plays, including: Helter Skelter, Hang Sorrow, Care'll Kill a Cat, The New Review (December 1975), reprinted in Cosmopolitan and included in Introduction 6: Stories by new writers, Faber and Faber (1977); Refugees, winner of the Socialist Challenge short story competition (judges: John Fowles, Fay Weldon, Terry Eagleton), Socialist Challenge (1977); Seven Ages; Quarto (June 1980), broadcast as Middling by BBC Radio 3. The Bird Has Flown, a radio play, was broadcast on BBC Radio 4 on 28 October 1976. A Coat of Many Colours, a radio play, was broadcast on BBC Radio 4 on 24 March 1979.

Crace has been a socialist throughout his life, though this is not evident from his published fiction. He stated that his "17-year-old self would read my bourgeois fiction, full of metaphors and rhythmic prose, with a sinking heart". He also admits to forgetting details from his own books.

Receiving a request to review a book by the Colombian writer Gabriel García Márquez and, not admiring it because he believed he could do just as well or fancying himself capable of doing even better, Crace set out to write what would become his first novel. 1986 brought the publication of that novel, titled Continent. It consists of seven stories, united by their setting and themes. Crace was aged 40 when Continent was published.

Crace's second book, The Gift of Stones, is set at the beginning of the Bronze Age. He based an amputation scene in that book on his father's experience with osteomyelitis—"his left arm was withered between his elbow and his shoulder. It was pitted with holes, and weeping with pus for most of my childhood," Crace stated. His third book, titled Arcadia, was published in 1992. It features a character called Victor, owner of a fruit and vegetable market in an unnamed city that resembles Covent Garden in London, and who has just reached his eightieth birthday.

Signals of Distress was published in 1994. Set in the nineteenth century, it features an African slave stranded on the outskirts of an English village and Aymer Smith, who will set it free. Quarantine was published in 1997. It depicts Jesus in the Judean desert. Despite intending to rewrite what he claimed was a harmful and dishonest narrative, Crace ended up writing what he called a "a very scriptural book" and when approached by its readers he discovers they "believe in God and have found that the book has underscored their beliefs rather than undermining it".

Being Dead, published in 1999, opens with a couple who are murdered while on a visit to some sand dunes. The Devil's Larder was published in 2001. Its preface contains a quote from the Book of Visitations, a work of Biblical apocrypha which does not exist. It is a collection of 64 stories, often on the theme of food, offering such insights as the taste of a cremated cat's remains, a restaurant in a coastal town in which nothing is served but the customer is charged anyway, two people trying to taste food in each other's mouth to detect any possible difference there might be. Six, which Crace admits is one of his least successful books, was published in 2003, flawed by his inability to concentrate wholly on it as his mother slowly died from dementia and cancer and the effort extracted by his being her primary carer. Other books would follow, among them The Pest House, which concerns America's medieval future.

He planned to write a book called Archipelago and spoke of it in advance. Archipelago, inspired by the loss of his parents, ultimately went unfinished, abandoned after 40,000 words. The very next day, following abandonment and whilst at the Watford Gap, he found inspiration to write what would become Harvest. It was published on 14 February 2013. Set over seven days in a rural area in an undetermined century, it features narrator Walter Thirsk. When it won the €100,000 International Dublin Literary Award, Crace said it was "vindication" for his publisher Picador: "I don't consider readers when I write, I write my own books and don't give a damn about what people think of them. And [Picador have] stood by me, they’ve said 'do what you want, we're your publisher for a career'".

Having "retired" from writing novels after Harvest, Crace reemerged in 2018 with The Melody. An elderly widower, curious as to what is rattling his bins at night, ventures out to investigate and is leapt upon and bitten by a creature he senses is different from the dogs or deer to which he is accustomed. On this occasion, it is, he is sure, a boy. eden was published in 2022. It is set in the eponymous Garden, following the expulsion of Adam and Eve.

On his writing experience Crace has stated: "With writing there is a moment of abandonment for me... particularly if you're not an autobiographical writer, and you're wanting this intuitive thing to bubble up, and to lead the story to places you don't expect it to go, then you have to wait for the moment of abandonment, because if you don't, these things aren't going to happen. I love that moment of abandonment, when a story starts to take over and take its own direction."

He set himself against Hilary Mantel's points on the writing of historical novels. Crace said: "Number one was that if you include a fact then you should make sure it is true. I'm not interested in that at all. I don't want facts, I want to make things up and to dig deep into traditional storytelling to produce a tale that illustrates the subject matter I care about". On Mantel's opposition to modern ideas being transposed onto a historical landscape, Crace responded: "No feminists in 1420. But I'm not interested in anything else but foisting those sensibilities and writing books that concern the 21st-century".

In 2001, he stated: "I adore falseness. I don't want you to tell me accurately what happened yesterday. I want you to lie about it, to exaggerate, to entertain me."

In response to the assertion by critic Adam Mars-Jones that to read a passage from a Crace book is to invite a migraine, he described it as "very funny... I recognise that that can be true... there are many things about my books that you can list and they will infuriate you. But that's my voice".

The University of Texas has purchased Crace's archive.

== Lecturing ==
As of 2013, Crace was visiting professor at the University of Texas at Austin.

== Works ==
=== Novels ===
- Continent. Heinemann. 1986. ISBN 978-0330453318. (seven stories)
- The Gift of Stones. Secker & Warburg. 1988. ISBN 978-0330453325.
- Arcadia. Jonathan Cape. 1992. ISBN 978-0330453332.
- Signals of Distress. Viking. 1994. ISBN 978-0670856961.
- Quarantine. Penguin Books. 1997. ISBN 978-0140239744.
- Being Dead. Viking Press. 1999. ISBN 978-0140239751.
- Six. Viking. 2003. ISBN 978-0670881161. (published in the US as Genesis) ISBN 978-0312423896
- The Pesthouse. Pan Macmillan Australia Pty, Limited. 2007. ISBN 978-0330445627.
- On Heat. Picador. 2008. ISBN 978-0330457996.
- All That Follows. Picador. 2010. ISBN 978-0330445641.
- Harvest. Picador. 2013. ISBN 978-0330445672.
- The Melody. Picador. 2018. ISBN 978-1509841363.
- eden. Picador. 2022. ISBN 978-1529062434.
- The Midnight Bell (2027)

=== Short story collections ===
- Crace, Jim (1995). The Slow Digestions of the Night. Penguin Books Limited. ISBN 978-0140252026. (short stories)
- Crace, Jim (2001). The Devil's Larder. Penguin Books. ISBN 978-0140276411. (64 short pieces). Extract in The Paris Review

== Awards and honours ==
He was elected a Fellow of the Royal Society of Literature in 1999.

- 1986: David Higham Prize for Fiction, for Continent
- 1986: Guardian Fiction Prize, for Continent
- 1986: Whitbread Award (First Novel), for Continent
- 1988: Premio Antico Fattore
- 1989: GAP International Prize for Literature, for The Gift of Stones
- 1994: Winifred Holtby Memorial Prize, for Signals of Distress
- 1996: American Academy of Arts and Letters E. M. Forster Award
- 1997: Booker Prize shortlist, for Quarantine
- 1997: Whitbread Award (Novel), for Quarantine
- 1999: National Book Critics Circle Award, for Being Dead
- 2000: Honorary doctorate from Birmingham City University
- 2001: International Dublin Literary Award shortlist, for Quarantine
- 2013: James Tait Black Memorial Prize, for Harvest
- 2013: Booker Prize shortlist, for Harvest
- 2014: Windham–Campbell Literature Prize (Fiction), valued at $150,000 one of the largest prizes in the world of its kind.
- 2015: International Dublin Literary Award, for Harvest

== See also ==
- Relationship between religion and science
