= Pascale Kann =

English actress

Pascale Kann is an English actress and filmmaker.

== Career ==
She premiered her short film Day by Day at the We The Peoples Film Festival at the BFI Southbank, London in November 2018. On stage, she was cast in a production of The Burial at Thebes at Lyric Hammersmith, London in 2020.

She made her screen debut playing September, one of twin Sisters at the heart of Ariane Labed's feature length directorial debut September Says, based upon the novel Sisters by Daisy Johnson. It had its world premiere at the 2024 Cannes Film Festival on 21 May 2024, in the Un Certain Regard section. She received praised for her role, displaying "terrifying commitment", and providing one of the "festival’s most memorable performances". She and her costar Mia Tharia were named arising Stars of the Festival by Vogue.

In February 2025, she was confirmed in the lead role of BBC One dystopian drama The Dream Lands based on the book Dreamland by Rosa Rankin-Gee, and in which she will appear alongside Connor Swindells, Anna Friel and Golda Rosheuvel.

== Filmography ==
Year	Title	Role	Notes
2024	September Says	September	Feature film
TBA	The Dream Lands	Chance	Lead role. Filming
