= The Eternal Daughter =

2022 film by Joanna Hogg

- Theatrical release poster
- Directed by: Joanna Hogg
- Written by: Joanna Hogg
- Produced by: Ed Guiney; Emma Norton; Andrew Lowe; Joanna Hogg
- Starring: Tilda Swinton; Joseph Mydell; Carly-Sophia Davies
- Cinematography: Ed Rutherford
- Edited by: Helle Le Fevre
- Production companies: A24; BBC Film; Element Pictures; JWH Films
- Distributed by: A24 (United States); BFI Distribution (United Kingdom)
- Release dates: 6 September 2022 (Venice); 2 December 2022 (United States)
- Running time: 96 minutes
- Countries: United Kingdom; United States
- Language: English
- Box office: $568,330

The Eternal Daughter is a 2022 Gothic mystery drama film produced, written and directed by Joanna Hogg. It stars Tilda Swinton in a double role, as both a middle-aged filmmaker and her elderly mother who are guests at a mysterious hotel. Joseph Mydell and Carly-Sophia Davies are featured in supporting roles.

The Eternal Daughter premiered at the 79th Venice International Film Festival on 6 September 2022, and was released in the United States on 2 December 2022 by A24.

== Plot ==
Middle-aged filmmaker Julie is riding with her elderly mother Rosalind and Rosalind's dog Louis in a taxi, whose driver recounts a ghost story. He drops them off at a large, secluded and seemingly empty hotel. Julie's father died a couple of years earlier and Julie wants to spend time with her mother in hopes of making a film about her. Shrouded in an eerie fog and echoing with creaks, thumps and moaning wind that keep Julie from sleeping well, the hotel is Rosalind's former family estate. She recounts painful memories that occurred there, including the death of a family member during World War II. Julie starts to cry with regret at dredging up these memories, but Rosalind assures her that it's not her fault and that she has happy memories of her childhood home as well.

One night, Julie walks into her room to find Louis missing. She searches the grounds frantically, enlisting the help of Bill, a hotel employee. Julie returns to the room and finds the dog sitting on the bed. She thanks Bill for his help and they share a drink as they bond over their shared grief—Julie's father and Bill's wife, who has also died recently. The following day, Rosalind's birthday, Julie overhears Rosalind talking with Bill. Rosalind says she feels sorry for Julie because she has no children of her own and dotes on her mother instead. Later, Rosalind recounts the circumstances of a miscarriage she had, after which Julie's cousin Alistair drops off flowers for her.

Julie arranges a special birthday supper with presents for her mother, but when Rosalind says that she is not hungry, Julie breaks down. She feels she cannot be happy when her mother is not happy and that she fears for the future as she has no children to take care of her when she is older. While bringing her mother a birthday cake, Julie begins sobbing and it is revealed that she is alone at the table and that her mother is dead. Bill visits Julie's room and comforts her, and later she dreams of Rosalind on her death bed.

The following day, the sun is shining and birds are singing as Julie works on her screenplay, which opens with the same scene that began this film. As she departs the hotel it is revealed to be full of guests and staff. The receptionist seems visibly concerned for Julie, who thanks her for her concern. Bill helps Julie get into a taxi, which carries her away.

== Cast ==
The cast includes:

- Tilda Swinton as filmmaker Julie Hart and her mother Rosalind Hart
- Joseph Mydell as Bill Hotel Employee
- August Joshi as Taxi Driver
- Carly-Sophia Davies as Hotel Receptionist
- Crispin Buxton as Cousin Alistair
- Louis as Louis the Dog

== Production ==
On January 18, 2021, it was announced that a film written and directed by Joanna Hogg and starring Tilda Swinton had wrapped. On January 27, 2021, it was confirmed that A24 acquired the worldwide distribution rights.

The film was shot in Wales, using Soughton Hall near Mold, during the COVID-19 pandemic lockdown.

== Release ==
The film premiered at the 79th Venice International Film Festival on 6 September 2022. It also screened at the 2022 Toronto International Film Festival and the 60th New York Film Festival. It was released in the United States on 2 December 2022. BFI Distribution acquired U.K. distribution rights in March 2023.

== Reception ==
=== Critical response ===
On the review aggregator website Rotten Tomatoes, 95% of 136 critics' reviews are positive, with an average rating of 7.7/10. The website's consensus reads: "Tilda Swinton is haunting in the gothic ghost story The Eternal Daughter, an ode to familial female ties that leaves much to unravel after the fog lifts." Metacritic, which uses a weighted average, assigned the film a score of 80 out of 100, based on 30 critics, indicating "generally favorable" reviews.

=== Year-end lists ===
The film appeared on a number of critics' lists of the best films of 2022:

- 2nd – Molly Haskell, Screen Slate
- 2nd – David Sims, The Atlantic
- 2nd – Florence Almozini, Film Comment Poll
- 3rd – Monica Castillo, RogerEbert.com
- 3rd – Justin Chang, The Los Angeles Times
- 3rd – Reverse Shot
