= Andrew Lowe =

Irish film producer

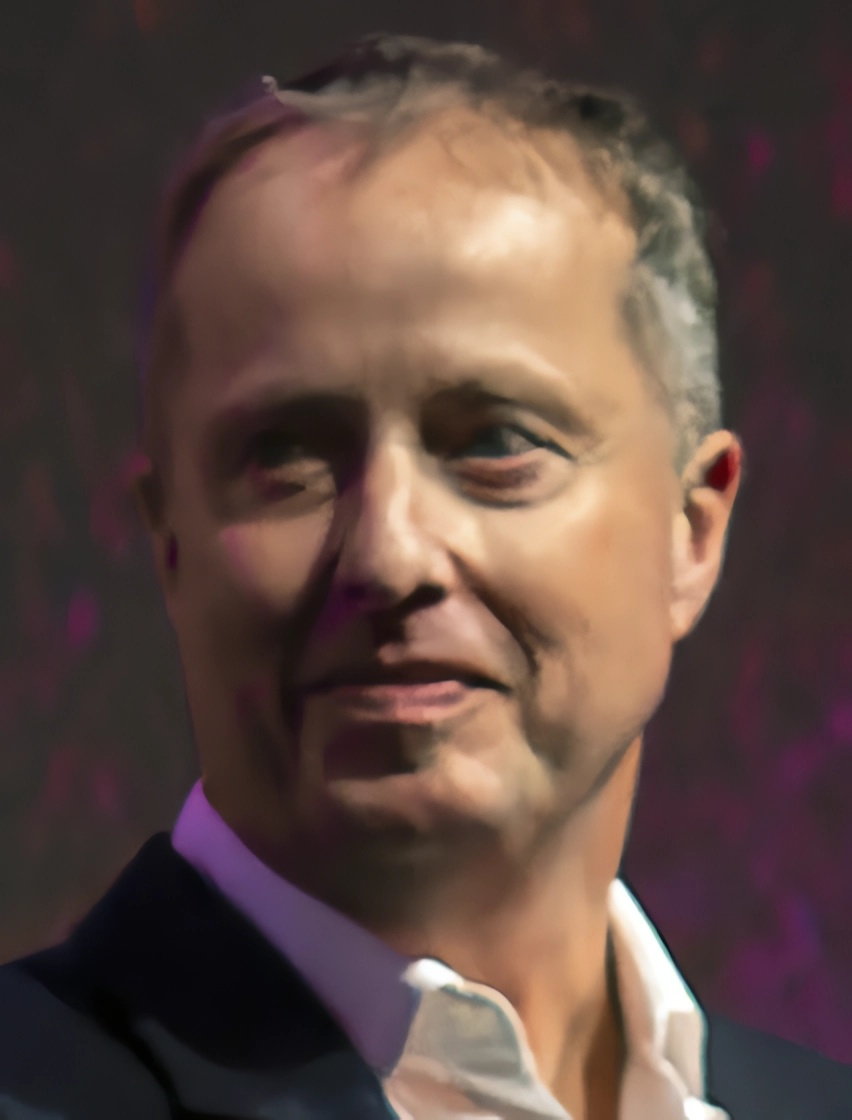
- Born: February 1968 (age 58)
- Education: Trinity College Dublin
- Occupation: Film producer

Andrew Mark Lowe (born February 1968) is an Irish film producer and a co-founder of the production company Element Pictures.

== Career ==
In 2001, together with Ed Guiney, he founded Element Pictures, a production company in Dublin.

Lowe has been a producer on such films as Cracks, The Guard, Shadow Dancer and Frank. His production of the fantasy film Poor Things directed by Yorgos Lanthimos earned him an Oscar nomination for Best Picture at the 96th Academy Awards along with Guiney, Lanthimos and Emma Stone.

Lowe is a board member of Screen Producers Ireland (SPI) and vice-chair of the IBEC Audiovisual Federation.

== Filmography ==
=== Producer ===
- 2005: Boy Eats Girl
- 2005: Lassie returns (Lassie)
- 2006: Robin Pilcher - Beyond the Ocean (TV movie)
- 2009: Zonad
- 2009: Cracks
- 2011: The Guard - An Irishman Sees Black (The Guard)
- 2012: Shadow Dancer
- 2014: Frank
- 2021: The Souvenir Part II
- 2022: The Wonder (The Wonder)
- 2022: The Eternal Daughter
- 2022: Chevalier
- 2023: Poor Things
- 2024: Kinds of Kindness
- 2024: September Says
- 2024: On Becoming a Guinea Fowl
- 2025: Bugonia
