= September Says =

2024 internationally co-produced drama film

- Film poster
- Directed by: Ariane Labed
- Screenplay by: Ariane Labed
- Based on: Sisters by Daisy Johnson
- Produced by: Ed Guiney; Andrew Lowe; Chelsea Morgan Hoffmann; Lara Hickey; Romanna Lobach
- Starring: Mia Tharia; Rakhee Thakrar; Pascale Kann
- Cinematography: Balthazar Lab
- Edited by: Bettina Böhler
- Production companies: Sackville; Cry Baby Productions; Element Pictures; BBC Film; Screen Ireland; ZDF / Arte; Eurimages; Match Factory Productions
- Distributed by: Mubi (United Kingdom and Germany); Volta Pictures (Ireland)
- Release date: 21 May 2024 (Cannes)
- Running time: 100 minutes
- Countries: France; Germany; Greece; Ireland; United Kingdom
- Language: English

September Says is a 2024 internationally co-produced horror drama film, written and directed by Ariane Labed, in her directorial debut. It is based upon the novel Sisters by Daisy Johnson. It stars Mia Tharia, Rakhee Thakrar and Pascale Kann.

It had its world premiere at the 2024 Cannes Film Festival on 21 May 2024, in the Un Certain Regard section.

== Premise ==
When September is suspended from school, her sister, July, begins to explore her own independence, leading to tension on a holiday in Ireland.

== Cast ==
- Mia Tharia as July
- Pascale Kann as September
- Rakhee Thakrar as Sheela
- Amelia Valentina Pankhania as Young July
- Sienna Rose Velikova as Young September
- Cal O'Driscoll as John
- Molly Nilsson as Woman singing in bar

== Production ==
In May 2022, it was announced Ariane Labed would direct the film, based upon the novel Sisters by Daisy Johnson, with Element Pictures set to produce. Eurimages and BBC Film among others provided financing for the film.

== Release ==
It had its world premiere at the 2024 Cannes Film Festival on 21 May 2024, in the Un Certain Regard section.

International sales are handled by The Match Factory. In September 2024, its parent Mubi acquired distribution rights to the film for the United Kingdom, Germany, Austria and Turkey, while Volta Pictures acquired distribution rights for Ireland.
