= List of accolades received by Poor Things (film) =

Accolades received by Poor Things
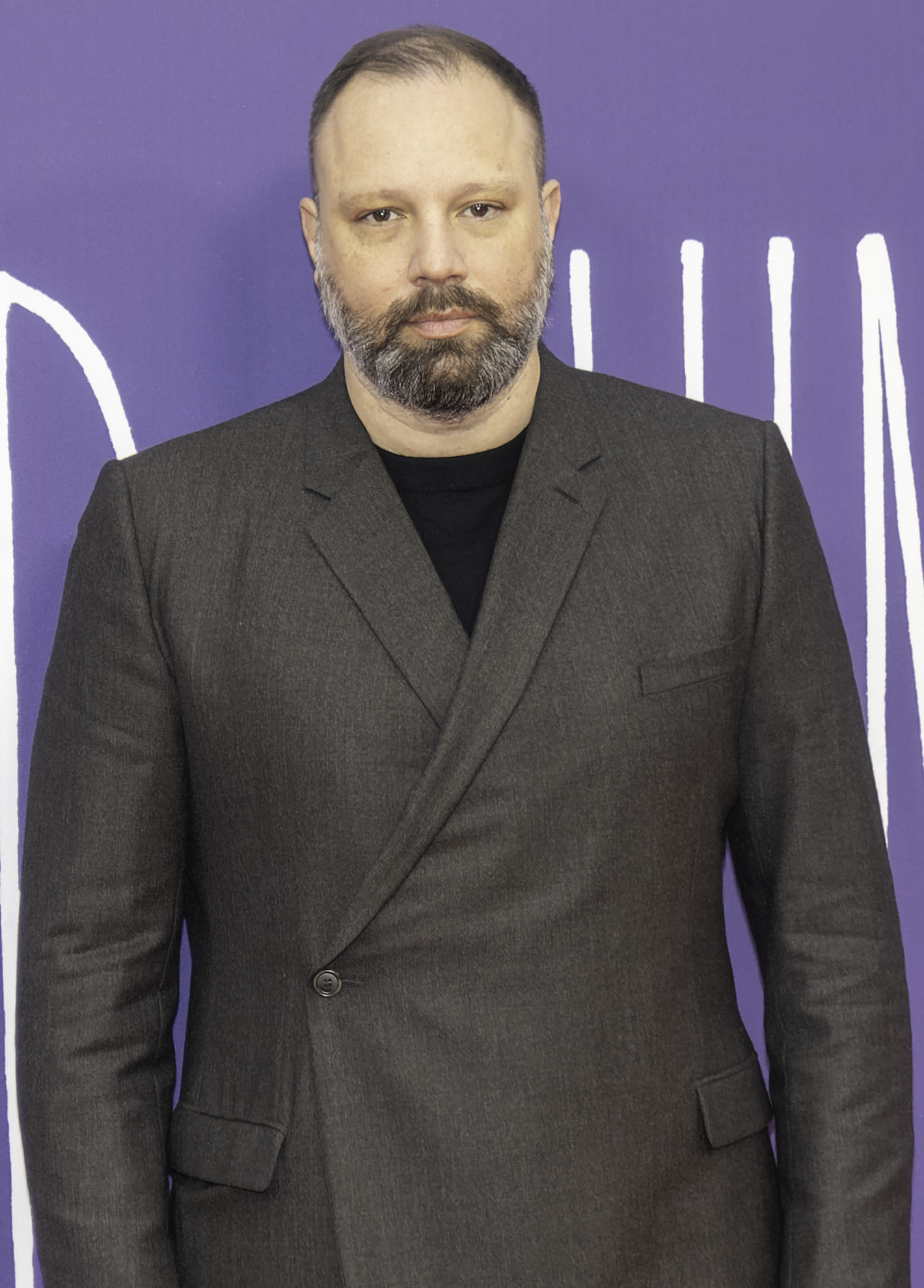
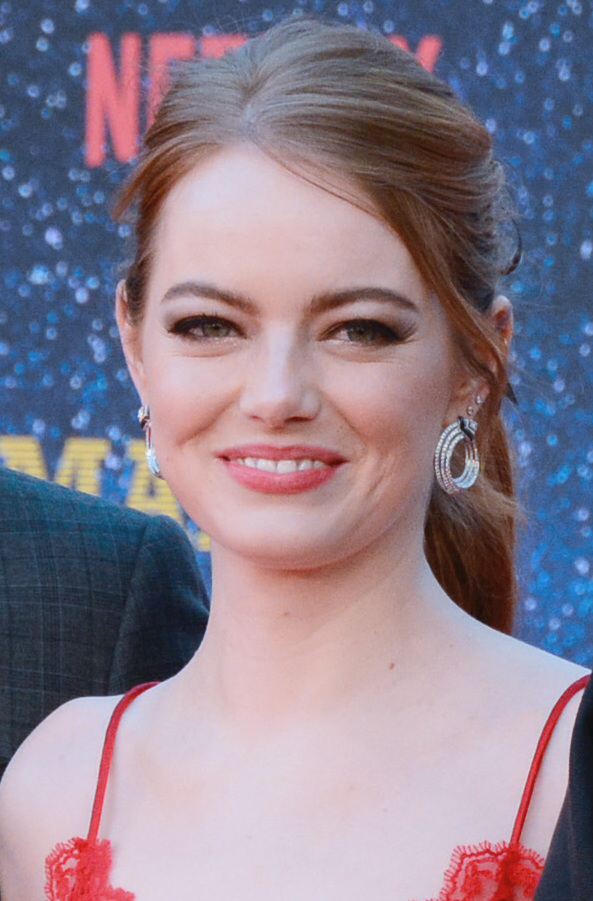
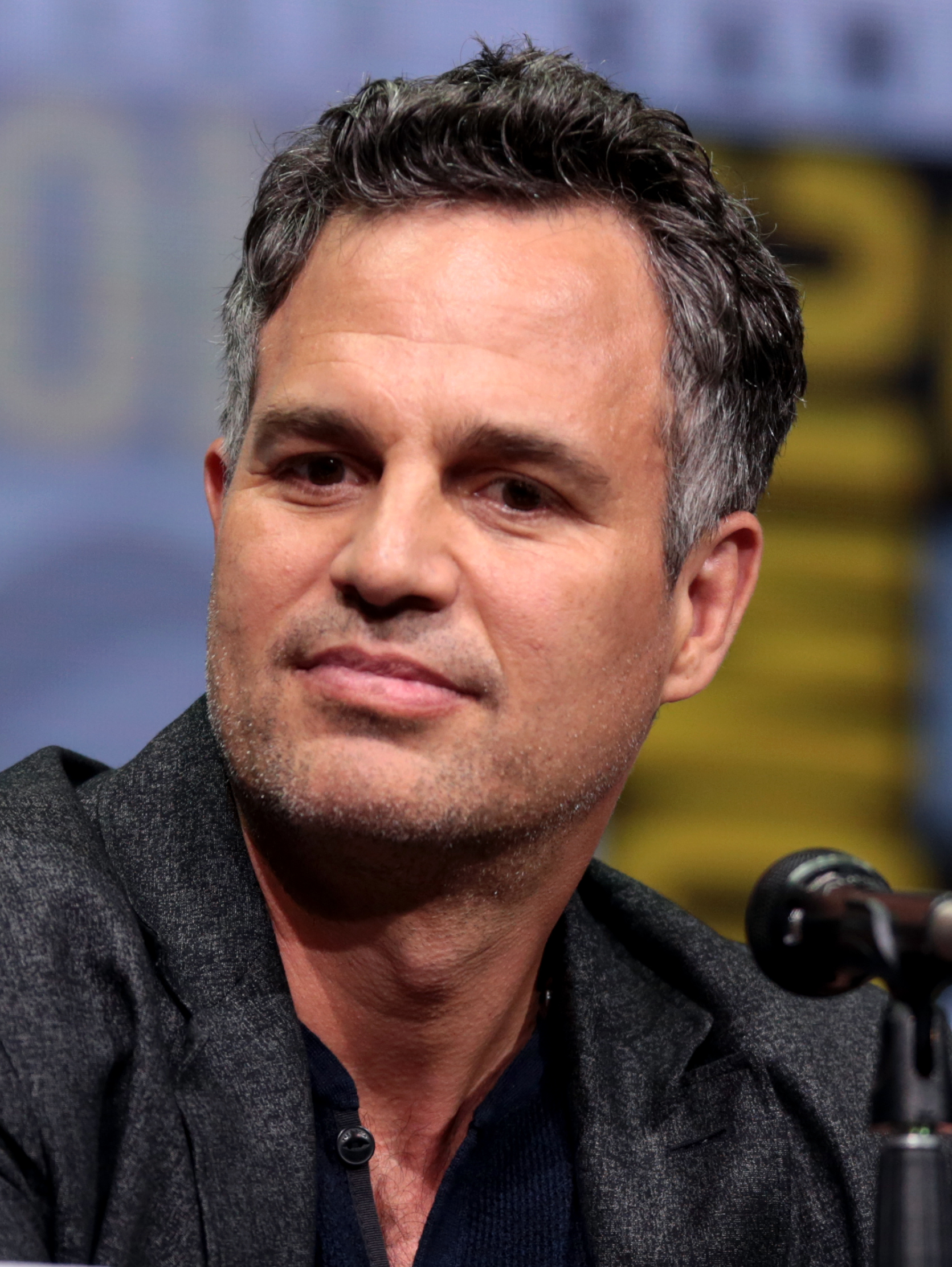
- Yorgos Lanthimos (left) received several accolades for his direction, as did Emma Stone (center) and Mark Ruffalo (right) for their performances.
Awards and nominations
Award	Wins	Nominations
AARP Movies for Grownups Awards	0	4
Academy Awards	4	11
American Cinema Editors	0	1
American Film Institute Awards	1	1
American Society of Cinematographers	0	1
Art Directors Guild Awards	1	1
Astra Film and Creative Awards	1	9
Belgian Film Critics Association	0	1
British Academy Film Awards	5	11
British Society of Cinematographers	0	1
Costume Designers Guild	1	1
Critics' Choice Movie Awards	1	13
Directors Guild of America Awards	0	1
Golden Globe Awards	2	7
Golden Reel Awards	0	1
Gotham Awards	0	1
Make-Up Artists and Hair Stylists Guild	0	2
National Board of Review	3	3
Producers Guild of America Awards	0	1
Satellite Awards	2	8
Saturn Awards	0	1
Screen Actors Guild Awards	0	2
Set Decorators Society of America Awards	1	1
USC Scripter Awards	0	1
Venice International Film Festival	2	2

Totals (Note: Certain award groups do not simply award one winner. They acknowledge several different recipients, have runners-up, and have third place. Since this is a specific recognition and is different from losing an award, runner-up mentions are considered wins in this award tally. For simplification and to avoid errors, each award in this list has been presumed to have had a prior nomination.)
- Wins: 92
- Nominations: 249

Poor Things is a 2023 science fantasy black comedy film directed by Yorgos Lanthimos and written by Tony McNamara. It stars Emma Stone, Mark Ruffalo, Willem Dafoe, Ramy Youssef, Christopher Abbott, and Jerrod Carmichael. Based on the 1992 novel by Alasdair Gray, the plot focuses on Bella Baxter, a young woman living in Victorian era London who, after being crudely resurrected by a scientist following her suicide, runs off with a debauched lawyer to embark on an odyssey of self-discovery and sexual liberation.

The film premiered at the 80th Venice International Film Festival on September 1, 2023, where it won the Golden Lion. It was released in the United States on December 8, 2023, and in Ireland and the United Kingdom on January 12, 2024, by Searchlight Pictures. The film received acclaim from critics, particularly for Stone's performance.

Poor Things has received several awards and nominations from critical and industry groups. At the 81st Golden Globe Awards, the film won Best Motion Picture – Musical or Comedy and Best Actress – Motion Picture Musical or Comedy for Stone. It was also nominated for thirteen Critics’ Choice Awards (including Best Picture), with Stone winning for Best Actress, eleven BAFTA Awards (including Best Film), winning for five awards, including Best Actress in a Leading Role for Stone, and eleven Academy Awards, winning for four awards. The American Film Institute and the National Board of Review named Poor Things as one of the top 10 films of the year.

== Accolades ==
Award	Date of ceremony	Category	Recipient(s)	Result	Ref.
AACTA International Awards	February 10, 2024	Best International Film	Poor Things	Nominated	
AACTA International Awards	February 10, 2024	Best International Direction	Yorgos Lanthimos	Nominated	
AACTA International Awards	February 10, 2024	Best International Actress	Emma Stone	Nominated	
AACTA International Awards	February 10, 2024	Best International Screenplay	Tony McNamara	Won	
AARP Movies for Grownups Awards	January 17, 2024	Best Screenwriter	Tony McNamara	Nominated	
AARP Movies for Grownups Awards	January 17, 2024	Best Supporting Actor	Mark Ruffalo	Nominated	
AARP Movies for Grownups Awards	January 17, 2024	Best Supporting Actor	Willem Dafoe	Nominated	
AARP Movies for Grownups Awards	January 17, 2024	Best Intergenerational Film	Poor Things	Nominated	
Academy Awards	March 10, 2024	Best Picture	Ed Guiney, Andrew Lowe, Yorgos Lanthimos and Emma Stone	Nominated	
Academy Awards	March 10, 2024	Best Director	Yorgos Lanthimos	Nominated	
Academy Awards	March 10, 2024	Best Actress	Emma Stone	Won	
Academy Awards	March 10, 2024	Best Supporting Actor	Mark Ruffalo	Nominated	
Academy Awards	March 10, 2024	Best Adapted Screenplay	Tony McNamara	Nominated	
Academy Awards	March 10, 2024	Best Original Score	Jerskin Fendrix	Nominated	
Academy Awards	March 10, 2024	Best Production Design	Production Design: James Price and Shona Heath; Set Decoration: Zsuzsa Mihalek	Won	
Academy Awards	March 10, 2024	Best Cinematography	Robbie Ryan	Nominated	
Academy Awards	March 10, 2024	Best Makeup and Hairstyling	Nadia Stacey, Mark Coulier, and Josh Weston	Won	
Academy Awards	March 10, 2024	Best Costume Design	Holly Waddington	Won	
Academy Awards	March 10, 2024	Best Film Editing	Yorgos Mavropsaridis	Nominated	
Art Directors Guild Awards	February 10, 2024	Excellence in Production Design for a Fantasy Film	James Price and Shona Heath	Won	
African-American Film Critics Association	January 15, 2024	Top 10 Films of the Year	Poor Things	7th Place	
American Film Institute Awards	December 7, 2023	Top 10 Films of the Year	Poor Things	Won (Note: This award does not have a single winner, but recognizes multiple films.)	
American Cinema Editors	March 3, 2024	Best Edited Feature Film (Comedy, Theatrical)	Yorgos Mavropsaridis	Nominated	
American Society of Cinematographers	March 3, 2024	Outstanding Achievement in Cinematography in Theatrical Releases	Robbie Ryan	Nominated	
Alliance of Women Film Journalists	January 4, 2024	Best Actress	Emma Stone	Nominated	
Alliance of Women Film Journalists	January 4, 2024	Most Daring Performance	Emma Stone	Won	
Alliance of Women Film Journalists	January 4, 2024	Best Actor in a Supporting Role	Mark Ruffalo	Nominated	
Alliance of Women Film Journalists	January 4, 2024	Best Screenplay, Adapted	Tony McNamara	Nominated	
Alliance of Women Film Journalists	January 4, 2024	Best Cinematography	Robbie Ryan	Nominated	
Alliance of Women Film Journalists	January 4, 2024	Most Egregious Lovers' Age Difference Award (Special Mention)	Mark Ruffalo and Emma Stone	Nominated	
Astra Film and Creative Arts Awards	January 6, 2024	Best Director	Yorgos Lanthimos	Nominated	
Astra Film and Creative Arts Awards	January 6, 2024	Best Actress	Emma Stone	Nominated	
Astra Film and Creative Arts Awards	January 6, 2024	Best Adapted Screenplay	Tony McNamara	Nominated	
Astra Film and Creative Arts Awards	February 26, 2024	Best Cinematography	Robbie Ryan	Nominated	
Astra Film and Creative Arts Awards	February 26, 2024	Best Costume Design	Holly Waddington	Won	
Astra Film and Creative Arts Awards	February 26, 2024	Best Production Design	James Price and Shona Heath	Nominated	
Astra Film and Creative Arts Awards	February 26, 2024	Best Hair and Makeup	Nadia Stacey	Nominated	
Astra Film and Creative Arts Awards	February 26, 2024	Best Score	Jerskin Fendrix	Nominated	
Astra Film and Creative Arts Awards	February 26, 2024	Best Visual Effects	Poor Things	Nominated	
Austin Film Critics Association	January 10, 2024	Best Film	Poor Things	Nominated	
Austin Film Critics Association	January 10, 2024	Best Director	Yorgos Lanthimos	Nominated	
Austin Film Critics Association	January 10, 2024	Best Actress	Emma Stone	Nominated	
Austin Film Critics Association	January 10, 2024	Best Supporting Actor	Mark Ruffalo	Nominated	
Austin Film Critics Association	January 10, 2024	Best Adapted Screenplay	Tony McNamara	Nominated	
Austin Film Critics Association	January 10, 2024	Best Cinematography	Robbie Ryan	Nominated	
Austin Film Critics Association	January 10, 2024	Best Editing	Yorgos Mavropsaridis	Nominated	
Austin Film Critics Association	January 10, 2024	Best Original Score	Jerskin Fendrix	Nominated	
Austin Film Critics Association	January 10, 2024	Best Ensemble	Poor Things	Nominated	
Belgian Film Critics Association	January 4, 2025	Grand Prix	Poor Things	Nominated	
Black Film Critics Circle	December 20, 2023	Top Ten Films	Poor Things	7th Place	
Black Film Critics Circle	December 20, 2023	Best Cinematography	Robbie Ryan	Won	
Black Reel Awards	January 16, 2024	Outstanding Breakthrough Performance	Jerrod Carmichael	Nominated	
Boston Society of Film Critics	December 10, 2023	Best Actress	Emma Stone	Runner-up (Note: Shared with Sandra Hüller for Anatomy of a Fall and Natalie Portman for May December.)	
Boston Society of Film Critics	December 10, 2023	Best Supporting Actor	Mark Ruffalo	Runner-up (Note: Shared with Robert Downey Jr. for Oppenheimer and Charles Melton for May December.)	
Boston Society of Film Critics	December 10, 2023	Best Cinematography	Robbie Ryan	Runner-up	
British Academy Film Awards	February 18, 2024	Best Film	Ed Guiney, Yorgos Lanthimos, Andrew Lowe, & Emma Stone	Nominated	
British Academy Film Awards	February 18, 2024	Best Actress in a Leading Role	Emma Stone	Won	
British Academy Film Awards	February 18, 2024	Best Adapted Screenplay	Tony McNamara	Nominated	
British Academy Film Awards	February 18, 2024	Best Cinematography	Robbie Ryan	Nominated	
British Academy Film Awards	February 18, 2024	Best Editing	Yorgos Mavropsaridis	Nominated	
British Academy Film Awards	February 18, 2024	Best Costume Design	Holly Waddington	Won	
British Academy Film Awards	February 18, 2024	Best Production Design	Shona Heath, Zsuzsa Mihalek, and James Price	Won	
British Academy Film Awards	February 18, 2024	Best Make Up & Hair	Nadia Stacey	Won	
British Academy Film Awards	February 18, 2024	Best Original Score	Jerskin Fendrix	Nominated	
British Academy Film Awards	February 18, 2024	Best Special Visual Effects	Tim Barter, Simon Hughes, Dean Koonjul, Jane Paton	Won	
British Academy Film Awards	February 18, 2024	Outstanding British Film	Yorgos Lanthimos, Ed Guiney, Andrew Lowe, Emma Stone, & Tony McNamara	Nominated	
British Society of Cinematographers	February 3, 2024	Best Cinematography in a Theatrical Feature Film	Robbie Ryan	Won	
Camerimage	November 18, 2023	Golden Frog	Robbie Ryan	Nominated	
Camerimage	November 18, 2023	Bronze Frog	Robbie Ryan	Won	
Camerimage	November 18, 2023	Audience Award	Yorgos Lanthimos	Won	
Chicago Film Critics Association	December 12, 2023	Best Film	Poor Things	Nominated	
Chicago Film Critics Association	December 12, 2023	Best Director	Yorgos Lanthimos	Nominated	
Chicago Film Critics Association	December 12, 2023	Best Actress	Emma Stone	Won	
Chicago Film Critics Association	December 12, 2023	Best Supporting Actor	Mark Ruffalo	Nominated	
Chicago Film Critics Association	December 12, 2023	Best Adapted Screenplay	Tony McNamara	Nominated	
Chicago Film Critics Association	December 12, 2023	Best Art Direction and Production Design	James Price and Shona Heath	Nominated	
Chicago Film Critics Association	December 12, 2023	Best Cinematography	Robbie Ryan	Nominated	
Chicago Film Critics Association	December 12, 2023	Best Costume Design	Holly Waddington	Won	
Chicago Film Critics Association	December 12, 2023	Best Original Score	Jerskin Fendrix	Nominated	
Chicago Film Critics Association	December 12, 2023	Best Use of Visual Effects	Poor Things	Nominated	
Costume Designers Guild	February 21, 2024	Excellence in Period Film	Holly Waddington	Won	
Critics' Choice Movie Awards	January 14, 2024	Best Picture	Poor Things	Nominated	
Critics' Choice Movie Awards	January 14, 2024	Best Director	Yorgos Lanthimos	Nominated	
Critics' Choice Movie Awards	January 14, 2024	Best Actress	Emma Stone	Won	
Critics' Choice Movie Awards	January 14, 2024	Best Supporting Actor	Mark Ruffalo	Nominated	
Critics' Choice Movie Awards	January 14, 2024	Best Adapted Screenplay	Tony McNamara	Nominated	
Critics' Choice Movie Awards	January 14, 2024	Best Cinematography	Robbie Ryan	Nominated	
Critics' Choice Movie Awards	January 14, 2024	Best Editing	Yorgos Mavropsaridis	Nominated	
Critics' Choice Movie Awards	January 14, 2024	Best Costume Design	Holly Waddington	Nominated	
Critics' Choice Movie Awards	January 14, 2024	Best Production Design	James Price and Shona Heath	Nominated	
Critics' Choice Movie Awards	January 14, 2024	Best Score	Jerskin Fendrix	Nominated	
Critics' Choice Movie Awards	January 14, 2024	Best Hair and Makeup	Poor Things	Nominated	
Critics' Choice Movie Awards	January 14, 2024	Best Visual Effects	Poor Things	Nominated	
Critics' Choice Movie Awards	January 14, 2024	Best Comedy	Poor Things	Nominated	
Critics' Choice Super Awards	April 4, 2024	Best Science Fiction/Fantasy Movie	Poor Things	Nominated	
Critics' Choice Super Awards	April 4, 2024	Best Actor in a Science Fiction/Fantasy Movie	Mark Ruffalo	Won	
Critics' Choice Super Awards	April 4, 2024	Best Actor in a Science Fiction/Fantasy Movie	Willem Dafoe	Nominated	
Critics' Choice Super Awards	April 4, 2024	Best Actress in a Science Fiction/Fantasy Movie	Emma Stone	Won	
Dallas–Fort Worth Film Critics Association	December 18, 2023	Best Film	Poor Things	4th Place	
Dallas–Fort Worth Film Critics Association	December 18, 2023	Best Director	Yorgos Lanthimos	4th Place	
Dallas–Fort Worth Film Critics Association	December 18, 2023	Best Actress	Emma Stone	2nd Place	
Dallas–Fort Worth Film Critics Association	December 18, 2023	Best Supporting Actor	Mark Ruffalo	4th Place	
Directors Guild of America Awards	February 10, 2024	Outstanding Directing – Feature Film	Yorgos Lanthimos	Nominated	
Dorian Awards	February 26, 2024	Film of the Year	Poor Things	Nominated	
Dorian Awards	February 26, 2024	Genre Film of the Year	Poor Things	Won	
Dorian Awards	February 26, 2024	Visually Striking Film of the Year	Poor Things	Won	
Dorian Awards	February 26, 2024	Film Performance of the Year	Emma Stone	Nominated	
Fangoria Chainsaw Awards	October 13, 2024	Best Lead Performance	Emma Stone	Nominated	
Fangoria Chainsaw Awards	October 13, 2024	Best Cinematography	Robbie Ryan	Won	
Fangoria Chainsaw Awards	October 13, 2024	Best Costume Design	Holly Waddington	Won	
Florida Film Critics Circle	December 21, 2023	Best Actress	Emma Stone	Runner-up	
Florida Film Critics Circle	December 21, 2023	Best Supporting Actor	Mark Ruffalo	Nominated	
Florida Film Critics Circle	December 21, 2023	Best Adapted Screenplay	Tony McNamara	Won	
Florida Film Critics Circle	December 21, 2023	Best Art Direction and Production Design	James Price and Shona Heath	Runner-up	
Florida Film Critics Circle	December 21, 2023	Best Cinematography	Robbie Ryan	Nominated	
Florida Film Critics Circle	December 21, 2023	Best Visual Effects	Poor Things	Nominated	
Gaudí Awards	January 18, 2025	Best European Film	Poor Things	Nominated	
Georgia Film Critics Association	January 5, 2024	Best Picture	Poor Things	Nominated	
Georgia Film Critics Association	January 5, 2024	Best Actress	Emma Stone	Runner-up	
Georgia Film Critics Association	January 5, 2024	Best Adapted Screenplay	Tony McNamara	Nominated	
Georgia Film Critics Association	January 5, 2024	Best Cinematography	Robbie Ryan	Nominated	
Georgia Film Critics Association	January 5, 2024	Best Production Design	James Price, Shona Heath, Szusza Mihalek	Runner-up	
Georgia Film Critics Association	January 5, 2024	Best Original Score	Jerskin Fendrix	Nominated	
Ghent International Film Festival	October 21, 2023	Best Film	Poor Things	Nominated	
Ghent International Film Festival	October 21, 2023	Georges Delerue Award for Best Original Music	Jerskin Fendrix	Won	
Golden Globe Awards	January 7, 2024	Best Motion Picture – Musical or Comedy	Poor Things	Won	
Golden Globe Awards	January 7, 2024	Best Actress – Motion Picture Musical or Comedy	Emma Stone	Won	
Golden Globe Awards	January 7, 2024	Best Supporting Actor – Motion Picture	Willem Dafoe	Nominated	
Golden Globe Awards	January 7, 2024	Best Supporting Actor – Motion Picture	Mark Ruffalo	Nominated	
Golden Globe Awards	January 7, 2024	Best Screenplay	Tony McNamara	Nominated	
Golden Globe Awards	January 7, 2024	Best Director	Yorgos Lanthimos	Nominated	
Golden Globe Awards	January 7, 2024	Best Original Score	Jerskin Fendrix	Nominated	
Golden Reel Awards	March 3, 2024	Outstanding Achievement in Sound Editing – Feature Dialogue / ADR	Johnnie Burn, Tristan Baylis, Peter Russell	Nominated	
Gotham Awards	November 27, 2023	Best International Feature	Poor Things	Nominated	
Houston Film Critics Society	January 22, 2024	Best Picture	Poor Things	Won	
Houston Film Critics Society	January 22, 2024	Best Director	Yorgos Lanthimos	Nominated	
Houston Film Critics Society	January 22, 2024	Best Actress	Emma Stone	Won	
Houston Film Critics Society	January 22, 2024	Best Supporting Actor	Mark Ruffalo	Nominated	
Houston Film Critics Society	January 22, 2024	Best Screenplay	Tony McNamara	Nominated	
Houston Film Critics Society	January 22, 2024	Best Original Score	Jerskin Fendrix	Nominated	
Houston Film Critics Society	January 22, 2024	Best Cinematography	Robbie Ryan	Nominated	
Houston Film Critics Society	January 22, 2024	Best Visual Effects	Poor Things	Won	
La Roche-sur-Yon International Film Festival	October 22, 2023	Grand Prix du Jury	Poor Things	Nominated	
Los Angeles Film Critics Association	December 10, 2023	Best Director	Yorgos Lanthimos	Runner-up	
Los Angeles Film Critics Association	December 10, 2023	Best Lead Performance	Emma Stone	Won	
Los Angeles Film Critics Association	December 10, 2023	Best Cinematography	Robbie Ryan	Won	
Los Angeles Film Critics Association	December 10, 2023	Best Production Design	James Price and Shona Heath	Runner-up	
Make-Up Artists and Hair Stylists Guild	February 18, 2024	Best Period and/or Character Make-Up	Nadia Stacey	Nominated	
Make-Up Artists and Hair Stylists Guild	February 18, 2024	Best Special Make-Up Effects	Nadia Stacey and Mark Coulier	Nominated	
Miskolc International Film Festival	September 9, 2023	Emeric Pressburger Prize for Best Feature Film	Poor Things	Nominated	
National Board of Review	December 6, 2023	Top Ten Films	Poor Things	Won	
National Board of Review	December 6, 2023	Best Supporting Actor	Mark Ruffalo	Won	
National Board of Review	December 6, 2023	Best Adapted Screenplay	Tony McNamara	Won	
National Society of Film Critics	January 6, 2024	Best Actress	Emma Stone	Runner-up (Note: Tied with Lily Gladstone for Killers of the Flower Moon.)	
Nevada Film Critics Society	December 23, 2023	Best Actress	Emma Stone	Won	
New York Film Critics Online	December 15, 2023	Top 10 Films	Poor Things	Won	
New York Film Critics Online	December 15, 2023	Best Supporting Actor	Mark Ruffalo	Won	
Palm Springs International Film Festival	January 4, 2024	Desert Palm Achievement Award – Actress	Emma Stone	Won	
Phoenix Film Critics Society	December 18, 2023	Top Ten Films of 2023	Poor Things	Won	
Phoenix Film Critics Society	December 18, 2023	Best Actress in a Leading Role	Emma Stone	Won	
Polish Film Awards	March 10, 2025	Best European Film	Yorgos Lanthimos	Nominated	
Producers Guild of America Awards	February 25, 2024	Darryl F. Zanuck Award for Outstanding Producer of Theatrical Motion Pictures	Poor Things	Nominated	
San Diego Film Critics Society	December 19, 2023	Best Actress	Emma Stone	Nominated	
San Diego Film Critics Society	December 19, 2023	Best Supporting Actor	Mark Ruffalo	Nominated	
San Diego Film Critics Society	December 19, 2023	Best Comedic Performance	Mark Ruffalo	Runner-up	
San Diego Film Critics Society	December 19, 2023	Best Cinematography	Robbie Ryan	Nominated	
San Diego Film Critics Society	December 19, 2023	Best Editing	Yorgos Mavropsaridis	Nominated	
San Diego Film Critics Society	December 19, 2023	Best Costume Design	Holly Waddington, Vincent Dumas, and Zsuzsa Stenger	Runner-up	
San Diego Film Critics Society	December 19, 2023	Best Production Design	James Price and Shona Heath	Nominated	
San Diego Film Critics Society	December 19, 2023	Best Visual Effects	Poor Things	Runner-up	
San Francisco Bay Area Film Critics Circle	January 9, 2024	Best Film	Poor Things	Nominated	
San Francisco Bay Area Film Critics Circle	January 9, 2024	Best Actress	Emma Stone	Won	
San Francisco Bay Area Film Critics Circle	January 9, 2024	Best Supporting Actor	Mark Ruffalo	Nominated	
San Francisco Bay Area Film Critics Circle	January 9, 2024	Best Adapted	Tony McNamara	Nominated	
San Francisco Bay Area Film Critics Circle	January 9, 2024	Best Cinematography	Robbie Ryan	Nominated	
San Francisco Bay Area Film Critics Circle	January 9, 2024	Best Film Editing	Yorgos Mavropsaridis	Nominated	
San Francisco Bay Area Film Critics Circle	January 9, 2024	Best Original Score	Jerskin Fendrix	Nominated	
San Francisco Bay Area Film Critics Circle	January 9, 2024	Best Production Design	Zsuzsa Mihalek, Shona Heath, and James Price	Nominated	
Santa Barbara International Film Festival	February 11, 2024	American Riviera Award	Mark Ruffalo	Won	
Santa Barbara International Film Festival	February 11, 2024	Variety Artisans Award	Holly Waddington	Won	
Satellite Awards	March 3, 2024	Best Motion Picture – Comedy or Musical	Poor Things	Nominated	
Satellite Awards	March 3, 2024	Best Director	Yorgos Lanthimos	Nominated	
Satellite Awards	March 3, 2024	Best Actress in a Motion Picture – Comedy or Musical	Emma Stone	Won	
Satellite Awards	March 3, 2024	Best Actor in a Supporting Role	Mark Ruffalo	Won	
Satellite Awards	March 3, 2024	Best Adapted Screenplay	Tony McNamara and Alasdair Gray	Nominated	
Satellite Awards	March 3, 2024	Best Film Editing	Yorgos Mavropsaridis	Nominated	
Satellite Awards	March 3, 2024	Best Costume Design	Holly Waddington	Nominated	
Satellite Awards	March 3, 2024	Best Original Score	Jerskin Fendrix	Nominated	
Saturn Awards	February 2, 2025	Best Fantasy Film	Poor Things	Nominated	
Screen Actors Guild Awards	February 24, 2024	Outstanding Performance by a Female Actor in a Leading Role	Emma Stone	Nominated	
Screen Actors Guild Awards	February 24, 2024	Outstanding Performance by a Male Actor in a Supporting Role	Willem Dafoe	Nominated	
Seattle Film Critics Society	January 8, 2024	Best Picture of the Year	Poor Things	Nominated	
Seattle Film Critics Society	January 8, 2024	Best Director	Yorgos Lanthimos	Nominated	
Seattle Film Critics Society	January 8, 2024	Best Actress in a Leading Role	Emma Stone	Nominated	
Seattle Film Critics Society	January 8, 2024	Best Actor in a Supporting Role	Mark Ruffalo	Nominated	
Seattle Film Critics Society	January 8, 2024	Best Screenplay	Tony McNamara	Nominated	
Seattle Film Critics Society	January 8, 2024	Best Cinematography	Robbie Ryan	Won	
Seattle Film Critics Society	January 8, 2024	Best Costume Design	Holly Waddington	Nominated	
Seattle Film Critics Society	January 8, 2024	Best Film Editing	Yorgos Mavropsaridis	Nominated	
Seattle Film Critics Society	January 8, 2024	Best Original Score	Jerskin Fendrix	Nominated	
Seattle Film Critics Society	January 8, 2024	Best Production Design	Shona Heath and James Price	Nominated	
Seattle Film Critics Society	January 8, 2024	Best Visual Effects	Simon Hughes	Nominated	
Set Decorators Society of America Awards	February 13, 2024	Best Achievement in Décor/Design of a Period Feature Film	Zsuzsa Mihalek, Shona Heath and James Price	Won	
St. Louis Film Critics Association	December 17, 2023	Best Actress	Emma Stone	Nominated	
St. Louis Film Critics Association	December 17, 2023	Best Costume Design	Holly Waddington	Runner-up	
St. Louis Film Critics Association	December 17, 2023	Best Production Design	James Price and Shona Heath	Runner-up	
Stockholm International Film Festival	November 21, 2023	Audience Award	Poor Things	Won	
Toronto Film Critics Association	December 17, 2023	Outstanding Lead Performance	Emma Stone	Runner-up (Note: Shared with Paul Giamatti for The Holdovers, Andrew Scott for All of Us Strangers, and Kôji Yakusho for Perfect Days.)	
Toronto Film Critics Association	December 17, 2023	Best Adapted Screenplay	Tony McNamara	Runner-up (Note: Shared with Andrew Haigh for All of Us Strangers.)	
USC Scripter Awards	March 2, 2024	Best Adapted Screenplay – Film	Tony McNamara	Nominated	
Vancouver Film Critics Circle	February 12, 2024	Best Female Actor	Emma Stone	Nominated	
Vancouver Film Critics Circle	February 12, 2024	Best Supporting Male Actor	Willem Dafoe	Nominated	
Venice International Film Festival	September 9, 2023	Golden Lion	Yorgos Lanthimos	Won	
Venice International Film Festival	September 9, 2023	UNIMED Award – Best Film	Yorgos Lanthimos	Won	
Washington D.C. Area Film Critics Association	December 10, 2023	Best Director	Yorgos Lanthimos	Nominated	
Washington D.C. Area Film Critics Association	December 10, 2023	Best Actress	Emma Stone	Nominated	
Washington D.C. Area Film Critics Association	December 10, 2023	Best Adapted Screenplay	Tony McNamara	Nominated	
Washington D.C. Area Film Critics Association	December 10, 2023	Best Cinematography	Robbie Ryan	Nominated	
Washington D.C. Area Film Critics Association	December 10, 2023	Best Original Score	Jerskin Fendrix	Nominated	
Washington D.C. Area Film Critics Association	December 10, 2023	Best Production Design	James Price and Shona Heath	Nominated	
Women Film Critics Circle	December 18, 2023	Best Movie About Women	Poor Things	Runner-up	
Women Film Critics Circle	December 18, 2023	Best Actress	Emma Stone	Won	
