= Grant Sputore =

Australian filmmaker

- Born: Perth, Western Australia
- Occupations: Film director; producer; podcast host
- Years active: 2008–present
- Website: www.grantsputore.com

Grant Sputore is an Australian filmmaker and podcast host. He made his directorial debut with the 2019 sci-fi thriller film I Am Mother, and is directing the upcoming 2027 monster film Godzilla x Kong: Supernova.

Sputore is also the founder of the production company The Penguin Empire.

== Early life ==
Grant was born and raised in Perth, Western Australia. He studied filmmaking at Curtin University. After graduating, Sputore founded his own production company, The Penguin Empire.

== Career ==
Sputore began his career as director of the short film Legacy, written by Ron Elliot and starring Murray Dowsett, James Fraser and Ian Meadows. It was released on July 11, 2008. The short film was winner of the Best Director and Best Drama at the West Australia Screen Awards.

As a commercial director, he directed commercials for The University of Western Australia, Toyota, IINET, UOB, Alcoholics Anonymous, and St John Ambulance. His work has been recognized at every major advertising award show around the world, including the Cannes Lions, D&AD, Clios, Spikes, NY Festivals, London International and AWARD.

In 2019, Sputore directed his first film, I Am Mother. It was written by Michael Lloyd Green and it was produced by Tim White and Kelvin Munro. It stars Clara Rugaard, Rose Byrne, Luke Hawker and Hilary Swank. The film premiered at the 2019 Sundance Film Festival. After being acquired by Netflix, it was released on July 7, 2019. The film received positive reviews by critics and was nominated in the 9th AACTA Awards in the categories of Best Supporting Actress and Best Visual Effects or Animation.

In June 2019, Sputore is announced to direct the sci-fi thriller film Augmented from a script written by Mark Townend and Michael Lloyd Green and produced by Margot Robbie.

In June 2024, it was announced that Sputore will direct Godzilla x Kong: Supernova, slated to be released on March 26, 2027.

== Other works ==
In March 2021, Sputore launched his own podcast called The Commentary Cast, featuring directors of films in the streaming age. Some of the guest filmmakers are Sam Hargrave, Mike Flanagan, Alexandre Aja, Gareth Evans, Michael Fimognari and Minhal Baig. The podcast can be found on Apple Podcasts, Google, Spotify and Stitcher.

In September 2024, Sputore collaborated with Rampage and Beast writer Ryan Engle and Dark Horse Comics to write a comic book series called Behemoth, about a group of bus passengers trying to survive inside the entrails of a giant monster after it swallows the bus. Volumes of the series were released throughout 2025.

== Filmography ==
Short film

- Legacy (2008)

Feature film

Year	Title	Director	Writer	Producer
2019	I Am Mother	Yes	Story	Executive
2020	The Furnace	No	No	Executive
2025	We Bury the Dead	No	No	Yes
2027	Godzilla x Kong: Supernova	Yes	No	No

Television

Year	Title	Notes
2011	Castaway	4 episodes

== Bibliography ==
- Behemoth #1–4 (with Ryan Engle), Dark Horse Comics (2025)
