= The Listeners (TV series) =

British television series

- Promotional poster
- Based on: The Listeners by Jordan Tannahill
- Written by: Jordan Tannahill
- Directed by: Janicza Bravo
- Starring: Rebecca Hall
- Countries of origin: Northern Ireland; United Kingdom
- Original language: English
- No. of episodes: 4 (5 in Australia)

Production
- Executive producers: Jordan Tannahill; Janicza Bravo; Rebecca Ferguson; Alice Birch; Ed Guiney; Andrew Lowe; Chelsea Morgan Hoffmann; Rachel Dargavel
- Producer: Ed King
- Production companies: BBC Studios; Element Pictures

Original release
- Network: BBC One
- Release: 19 November 2024

The Listeners is a 2024 miniseries based on the 2021 novel by Jordan Tannahill. It was released by BBC One on 19 November 2024.

== Premise ==
An English teacher Claire (Rebecca Hall) is tormented by a continuous humming noise that seemingly only a few people are able to hear. This premise is based on The Hum, a phenomenon that has been reported in several places around the world.

== Cast and characters ==
- Rebecca Hall as Claire
- Ollie West as Kyle
- Prasanna Puwanarajah as Paul, Claire's husband
- Amr Waked as Omar, facilitator of a support group for those who hear the Hum
- Gayle Rankin as Jo, Omar's wife and co-facilitator
- Mia Tharia as Ashley, Claire's daughter
- Franc Ashman as Cassandra, Claire's colleague
- Samuel Edward-Cook as Damian, a fellow listener
- Karen Henthorn as Emily, a fellow listener
- Lucy Sheen as Teresa, a fellow listener
- Ian Mercer as Tom, Emily's husband
- Scottee as Noam, a fellow listener
- Shreya M. Patel as Seema, a fellow listener
- Kiruna Stamell as Dr Broodthaers, Claire's therapist

== Episodes ==
No.	Title	Directed by	Written by	Original release date
1	"Episode 1"	Janicza Bravo	Jordan Tannahill	19 November 2024
2	"Episode 2"	Janicza Bravo	Jordan Tannahill	19 November 2024
3	"Episode 3"	Janicza Bravo	Jordan Tannahill	19 November 2024
4	"Episode 4"	Janicza Bravo	Jordan Tannahill	19 November 2024

== Production ==
Jordan Tannahill adapted his own novel for television, with Janicza Bravo on board as director. Tannahill and Bravo are also executive producers on the series, along with Ed Guiney, Andrew Lowe, Chelsea Morgan Hoffmann and Rachel Dargavel for Element Pictures, Rebecca Ferguson for the BBC, and Alice Birch. The series is produced by Ed King.

In February 2024, Rebecca Hall was confirmed in the lead role. The cast also includes Ollie West, Prasanna Puwanarajah, Amr Waked, Gayle Rankin and Mia Tharia.

Filming took place in Manchester and first look images from filming were released in February 2024.

== Broadcast ==
The series was screened at the 2024 Toronto International Film Festival on September 11, in the Primetime program, and broadcast in the United Kingdom on BBC One and BBC iPlayer on 19 November 2024. Starz acquired the series for the United States, where it premiered on 12 June 2026.

The series released on Australian streaming services Binge and Foxtel On Demand, this version was recut with extra scenes into five episodes instead of the original four.

== Reception ==
The review aggregator website Rotten Tomatoes reported an 89% approval rating with an average rating of 7.20/10 based on 19 critic reviews. The website's critics consensus reads, "Unfolding its mysteries at a patient pace, The Listeners beckons viewers to pay close attention -- which is made all the easier by Rebecca Hall's compelling presence". Metacritic, which uses a weighted average, assigned a score of 73 out of 100 based on 16 critics, indicating "generally favorable" reviews.

The series received four-star reviews from The Times, The Guardian, the Daily Mail, the Financial Times, The Independent, and the Evening Standard, among others. Lucy Mangan in The Guardian called the series a "hauntingly delicate drama [that] will paralyse you with dread", while India Block in the Evening Standard described it as "a hallucinatory, nightmarish drama exploring mystery and conspiracy", and actress Rebecca Hall as "a revelation." James Jackson in The Times wrote "the actors are impeccable throughout, none more so than Hall, who... in the throes of ecstatic ritual, seems to be staring directly into the fabric of the universe. The Listeners takes suburban ennui to a new level altogether." Asyia Iftikhar in Metro wrote "not only was this taut thriller one of the best written shows of the year, but, in an incredibly divided society, I can't help but think it is 2024's most important watch."
