= The Paris Literary Prize =

French literary award

- Sponsored by: The de Groot Foundation
- Country: France (Paris)
- Status: Inactive / Hiatus
- First award: 2010 (Founded)

The Paris Literary Prize was a biennial literary prize for unpublished novellas by new authors from anywhere in the world. It was founded in 2010 by the Paris-based Shakespeare and Company bookstore, and sponsored in collaboration with the de Groot Foundation. The €10,000 prize was for authors who had never published a book before, and their submission is a novella, defined as 20,000 to 30,000 words in length. The first winner was announced on 16 June 2011.

After two awards it went into hiatus, saying "We'd love to hold another edition of the prize at some point, but we are unable to fix a date at this time."

== Winners and Runners-up ==
Blue Ribbon = winner

2011

- Winner: Rosa Rankin-Gee, The Last Kings of Sark
- Adam Biles, Grey Cats
- Agustín Maes, Newborn

2013

- Winner C.E. Smith, Body Electric
- Svetlana Lavochkina, Dam Duchess
- Tessa Brown, Sorry for Partying
