= Susan Chardy =

British-Zambian actress and model

- Born: Susan Gossage; Zambia
- Occupations: Actress; model; philanthropist
- Spouse: Jérémy Chardy (m. 2017)
- Children: 1

Susan Chardy (née Gossage) is a British-Zambian actress and model. She won Best Breakthrough Performance at the British Independent Film Awards 2024 for her role in On Becoming a Guinea Fowl (2024).

== Early life ==
She was born in Zambia but moved at around the age of 10 years-old to attend school in England. She remains fluent in the Bemba language.

== Career ==
She has worked as a model for brands such as Rimmel London and L’Oréal. She completes philanthropic work for the Global Fund for Children, for whom she is a global ambassador, and the Nelson Mandela Children's Fund UK. She founded the annual “Wimby Wednesday” fundraiser.

She made her feature film debut as Shula in the Rungano Nyoni written and directed black comedy On Becoming a Guinea Fowl, which premiered in competition at the Cannes Film Festival in 2024. In reviews of her performance she was described as being “restrained” and “anchoring the film" with a "poker face, unruffled". For the role, she won the 2024 British Independent Film Award for Breakthrough Performance and was also nominated for Best Lead Performance.

== Personal life ==
She married tennis professional Jérémy Chardy on 16 September 2017, having become engaged in Zambia in 2016. They have one son.

== Filmography ==
Year	Title	Role	Notes
2024	On Becoming a Guinea Fowl	Shula	Lead role. Feature film
