= The Guard (2011 film) =

2011 Irish film by John Michael McDonagh

- Theatrical release poster
- Directed by: John Michael McDonagh
- Written by: John Michael McDonagh
- Produced by: Chris Clark; Flora Fernandez-Marengo; Ed Guiney; Andrew Lowe
- Starring: Brendan Gleeson; Don Cheadle; Mark Strong; Liam Cunningham; Fionnula Flanagan
- Cinematography: Larry Smith
- Edited by: Chris Gill
- Music by: Calexico
- Production companies: Irish Film Board; Reprisal Films; Element Pictures; Crescendo Productions; Aegis Film Fund; Prescience; RTÉ; UK Film Council
- Distributed by: Element Pictures (Ireland); Optimum Releasing (United Kingdom)
- Release dates: 20 January 2011 (Sundance Film Festival); 7 July 2011 (Ireland)
- Running time: 93 minutes
- Countries: Ireland; United Kingdom
- Languages: English; Irish
- Budget: $6 million
- Box office: $21.2 million

The Guard is a 2011 buddy cop comedy film written and directed by John Michael McDonagh, starring Brendan Gleeson, Don Cheadle, Mark Strong and Liam Cunningham.

The film received critical acclaim and was a box office success. Both Gleeson and Cheadle received acclaim for their performances, with Gleeson receiving a Golden Globe Award nomination. McDonagh was in turn nominated for a BAFTA Award for his writing achievement. It is the most successful independent Irish film of all time in terms of Irish box-office receipts, overtaking The Wind that Shakes the Barley (2006).

== Plot ==
Sergeant Gerry Boyle is an officer of the Garda Síochána (police) in the Connemara district in the west of Ireland. He is crass and confrontational, regularly indulging in drugs and alcohol even while on duty. He is also shown to be well read and highly intelligent as well as having a softer side, showing concern for his ailing mother, Eileen.

Boyle and his new subordinate, Aidan McBride, investigate a murder, with evidence apparently pointing to an occult serial killer. Shortly after, Boyle attends a briefing by an American Federal Bureau of Investigation (FBI) agent Wendell Everett, sent to liaise with the Garda in hunting four Irish drug traffickers led by Francis Sheehy-Skeffington, who is believed to be awaiting a massive seaborne delivery of cocaine from Jamaica. Boyle recognises one of the men in Everett's presentation as the victim of the murder he and McBride had been investigating. McBride pulls over a car driven by Sheehy and his lieutenants Clive Cornell and Liam O'Leary and is shot dead. McBride's wife, Gabriela, reports McBride's disappearance to Boyle, who promises to look into it.

The strait-laced Everett suggests that he and the unorthodox Boyle team up to track down Sheehy and his men. Everett makes the rounds, encountering Irish-speaking residents who pretend not to understand English rather than deal with an outsider. Boyle has a sexual encounter with a pair of sex workers at a hotel in town. On his way back from the hotel, Boyle spots McBride's Garda car at a "suicide hotspot" along the coast but does not believe that McBride killed himself. Gabriela, an immigrant from Croatia, tells Boyle that McBride is gay and that she married him to obtain an Irish visa as well as to make McBride "look respectable".

Meeting Everett at a local pub, Boyle notices a closed-circuit television camera and remembers that the original suspect in the murder case claimed to be frequenting it at the time of the killing. Looking over the footage from the time of the murder, they see that the suspect's alibi is valid – and Everett also spots Sheehy and Cornell at the pub. Cornell delivers a payoff to the Garda inspectors to keep them off the case and is warned that Boyle "is too unpredictable". After Sheehy meets with Boyle to half-heartedly attempt blackmail and then to offer a bribe, both are refused. Tipped off by a young boy named Eugene, Boyle discovers a cache of weapons hidden in the bog by the Provisional Irish Republican Army (IRA) and says he will arrange its return. (It is later revealed that Boyle kept a few of the guns.) Shortly after having her last wish to hear a live pub band fulfilled, Boyle's mother kills herself by overdosing on pills.

Meeting at the bar again, Everett tells Boyle that Garda sources indicate Sheehy's shipment will be coming into County Cork and that he is leaving to investigate. Returning home, Boyle is confronted in his living room by O'Leary, who has been ordered by Sheehy to murder him. Instead, Boyle pulls a Derringer (from the IRA cache) and kills O'Leary, then calls Everett to tell him that the Cork lead is a decoy arranged by corrupt Garda officers. Boyle drives to the local dock where Sheehy's vessel is berthed and Sheehy's men are unloading the cocaine. Everett arrives and Boyle hands him an automatic rifle and persuades him to provide covering fire as he moves to arrest Sheehy and Cornell. Boyle kills Cornell before leaping onto the boat to deal with Sheehy. Everett's gunfire sets the boat alight. Boyle shoots Sheehy and leaves him wounded in the main cabin as the boiler explodes.

The next day, a shattered Everett looks out on the water where the boat sank, believing Boyle to be dead. Eugene, standing nearby, mentions that Boyle was a good swimmer, having placed fourth at the 1988 Summer Olympics, a claim that Everett had dismissed. A young photographer comments that it would be easy enough to look it up to check whether or not it was true. Everett remembers Boyle's remark that Sheehy's corrupt backers would not forget Boyle's actions and that Boyle would have to disappear were he to continue living, and smiles.

== Cast ==
- Brendan Gleeson as Garda Sergeant Gerry Boyle
- Don Cheadle as FBI Agent Wendell Everett
- Mark Strong as Clive Cornell
- Liam Cunningham as Francis Sheehy-Skeffington
- Fionnula Flanagan as Eileen Boyle
- Mícheál Óg Lane as Eugene Moloney
- David Wilmot as Liam O'Leary
- Sarah Greene as Sinéad Mulligan
- Darren Healy as Jimmy Moody
- Rory Keenan as Garda Aidan McBride
- Dominique McElligott as Aoife O'Carroll
- Katarina Čas as Gabriela McBride
- Dermot Healy as Old farmer
- Pat Shortt as Colum Hennessy
- Laurence Kinlan as Young photographer
- Wale Ojo as Doctor Oleyuwo

== Production ==
=== Development ===
Film producers include Chris Clark, Flora Fernandez-Marengo, Ed Guiney and Andrew Lowe, with executive producers Paul Brett, Don Cheadle, Martin McDonagh (brother of John Michael), David Nash, Ralph Kamp, Lenore Zerman and associate producer Elizabeth Eves. Director John Michael McDonagh is known for his screenplay for the 2003 film Ned Kelly and as writer/director of the 2000 film The Second Death. Cinematographer Larry Smith is known for his work on Eyes Wide Shut and production designer John-Paul Kelly for his work on Venus.

=== Filming ===
Principal filming began on 29 October 2009, in Lettermore County Galway. Filming took place over a six-week period in Connemara, Lettermore, Lettermullan, Spiddal, and Barna with some scenes for filming in Wicklow and Dublin. Companies involved were Reprisal Films and Element Pictures in association with Prescience, Aegis Film Fund, UK Film Council and Crescendo Productions, with the participation of the Irish Film Board.

International sales were handled by Metropolis Films and the film was released by Element Pictures Distribution in Ireland, Optimum Releasing in the United Kingdom, Sony Pictures Classics in the United States and Alliance Films in Canada.

== Reception ==
=== Critical response ===
The review aggregation website Rotten Tomatoes reported a 94% approval rating with an average rating of 7.65/10 based on 134 reviews. The website's consensus reads, "A violent, crackerjack comedy with a strong Irish flavor and an eminently likable Brendan Gleeson in the main role." On Metacritic, the film has a score of 78 out of 100, based on reviews from 29 critics, indicating "generally favorable reviews".

In The Hollywood Reporter, Todd McCarthy wrote: "Scabrous, profane, violent, verbally adroit and very often hilarious, this twisted and exceptionally accomplished variation on the buddy-cop format is capped by a protean performance by Brendan Gleeson a defiantly iconoclastic West of Ireland policeman." Vanity Fair's John Lopez wrote: "So far, The Guard has been the most thoroughly enjoyable film experience at Sundance, a nice change of pace from the anomie, alienated angst and melancholy of other films." In Screen International, David D'Arcy wrote: "As a director, McDonagh avoids the grand gesture and focuses on his web of odd characters that call to mind the comedies of Preston Sturges." Justin Chang of Variety wrote: "The film making crackles with energy, from Chris Gill's crisp editing and Calexico's ever-inventive score to d.p. Larry Smith's dynamic camerawork, alternating between bright, almost candy-coloured interiors and shots of Galway's grey, rugged landscape."

In The Times, Wendy Ide wrote: "Without doubt the strongest debut film of the year so far, this sly, witty and provocative Irish black comedy is an exceptionally funny crowd-pleaser and a playful cine-literate exercise, laced with arcane movie references... Gleeson must be thanking whatever guardian angel oversees his career for the brothers McDonagh giving him two of his meatiest roles yet." Georgie Hobbs of Little White Lies wrote: "Unexpectedly hilarious, The Guard is the triumphant directorial debut of Ned Kelly screenwriter (and brother of In Bruges director Martin), John Michael McDonagh... This confident film knows full well how funny it is, daring to provoke with unfettered 'unPCness' a-plenty."

=== Accolades ===
Accolades
Award / Film Festival	Year	Category	Recipient(s)	Result	Ref.
Golden Globe Award	2012	Best Actor – Motion Picture Musical or Comedy	Brendan Gleeson	Nominated	
BAFTA Award	2012	Best Original Screenplay	John Michael McDonagh	Nominated	
Australian Film Critics Association Award	2012	Best Overseas Film (English-Language)	The Guard	Nominated	
Berlin International Film Festival	2011	Best Debut Film – Honorable Mention	The Guard	Won	
BET Award	2012	Best Actor	Don Cheadle	Nominated	
British Independent Film Award	2011	Best Actor in a British Independent Film	Brendan Gleeson	Nominated	
British Independent Film Award	2011	Best Screenplay	John Michael McDonagh	Nominated	
British Independent Film Award	2011	Douglas Hickox Award	John Michael McDonagh	Nominated	
Black Reel Award	2012	Best Supporting Actor	Don Cheadle	Won	
Casting Society of America	2012	Outstanding Achievement in Casting – Feature – Studio or Independent Comedy	Jina Jay	Nominated	
Chlotrudis Award	2012	Best Original Screenplay	John Michael McDonagh	Nominated	
Crime Thriller Award	2012	The Film Dagger	The Guard	Nominated	
Dinard British Film Festival	2011	Audience Award	John Michael McDonagh; Reprisal Films	Won	
Dinard British Film Festival	2011	Coup de Coeur	John Michael McDonagh; Reprisal Films	Won	
Dinard British Film Festival	2011	Kodak Award for Best Cinematography	Larry Smith; Reprisal Films	Won	
Dinard British Film Festival	2011	Silver Hitchcock	The Guard	Won	
Evening Standard British Film Award	2011	Peter Sellers Award for Comedy	The Guard	Won	
Evening Standard British Film Award	2011	Best Actor	Brendan Gleeson	Won	
Evening Standard British Film Award	2011	Best Screenplay	John Michael McDonagh	Won	
NAACP Image Award	2012	Outstanding Supporting Actor in a Motion Picture	Don Cheadle	Nominated	
Irish Film and Television Award	2012	Best Film	Chris Clark, Flora Fernandez Marengo, Ed Guiney and Andrew Lowe	Won	
Irish Film and Television Award	2012	Best Director – Film	John Michael McDonagh	Won	
Irish Film and Television Award	2012	Best Script – Film	John Michael McDonagh	Won	
Irish Film and Television Award	2012	Best Supporting Actress – Film	Fionnula Flanagan	Won	
Irish Film and Television Award	2012	Best Actor – Film	Brendan Gleeson	Won	
Irish Film and Television Award	2012	Best Supporting Actor – Film	Liam Cunningham	Nominated	
Irish Film and Television Award	2012	Best International Actor	Don Cheadle	Nominated	
Irish Film and Television Award	2012	Best Production Design (Film/TV Drama)	John Paul Kelly	Nominated	
Irish Film and Television Award	2012	Best Sound (Film/TV Drama)	Robert Flanagan, Michelle Cunniffe and Niall Brady	Nominated	
London Film Critics Circle Award	2011	British Film of the Year	The Guard	Nominated	
London Film Critics Circle Award	2011	Breakthrough British Filmmaker	John Michael McDonagh	Nominated	
London Film Critics Circle Award	2011	British Actor of the Year	Brendan Gleeson	Nominated	
San Diego Film Critics Society Award	2011	Best Actor	Brendan Gleeson	Nominated	
Sarajevo Film Festival	2011	Audience Award for Best Feature Film	The Guard	Won	
Satellite Award	2011	Best Director	John Michael McDonagh	Nominated	
Satellite Award	2011	Best Actor – Motion Picture	Brendan Gleeson	Nominated	
Satellite Award	2011	Best Original Screenplay	John Michael McDonagh	Nominated	
Satellite Award	2011	Best Editing	Chris Gill	Won	
Sundance Film Festival	2011	World Cinema Grand Jury Prize: Dramatic	The Guard	Nominated	
Valladolid International Film Festival	2011	Best Actor	Brendan Gleeson	Won	
