= Poor Things (film) =

2023 science fiction black comedy film by Yorgos Lanthimos

- Theatrical release poster
- Directed by: Yorgos Lanthimos
- Screenplay by: Tony McNamara
- Based on: Poor Things by Alasdair Gray
- Produced by: Ed Guiney; Andrew Lowe; Yorgos Lanthimos; Emma Stone
- Starring: Emma Stone; Mark Ruffalo; Willem Dafoe; Ramy Youssef; Christopher Abbott; Jerrod Carmichael
- Cinematography: Robbie Ryan
- Edited by: Yorgos Mavropsaridis
- Music by: Jerskin Fendrix
- Production companies: Film4; Element Pictures; Fruit Tree; Limp
- Distributed by: Searchlight Pictures
- Release dates: September 1, 2023 (Venice); December 8, 2023 (United States); January 12, 2024 (United Kingdom and Ireland)
- Running time: 142 minutes
- Countries: Ireland; United Kingdom; United States
- Language: English
- Budget: $35 million
- Box office: $117.6 million

Poor Things is a 2023 film (Note: The film has been referenced as a "genre-defying" piece of work, with critics labeling it a sex comedy, black comedy and absurdist comedy, and noting its steampunk-like visual design. See the corresponding section of this article for further information regarding the film's genre.) directed by Yorgos Lanthimos and written by Tony McNamara, based on the 1992 novel by Alasdair Gray. A co-production between Ireland, the United Kingdom, and the United States, the film stars Emma Stone, Mark Ruffalo, Willem Dafoe, Ramy Youssef, Christopher Abbott, and Jerrod Carmichael. It follows Bella Baxter (Stone), a young woman in Victorian London whose body is reanimated by the brilliant and unorthodox scientist Dr. Godwin Baxter (Dafoe).

Principal photography took place in Hungary from August to December 2021. Poor Things premiered at the 80th Venice International Film Festival on September 1, 2023, where it won the Golden Lion. The film received critical acclaim, with praise for Lanthimos’ direction, the screenplay, and performances, particularly Stone and Ruffalo. It was released theatrically in the United States on December 8, 2023, and in Ireland and the United Kingdom on January 12, 2024, by Searchlight Pictures. It became a box office success, grossing over $117 million worldwide on a budget of $35 million, becoming Lanthimos' highest-grossing film.

Poor Things was named one of the top ten films of 2023 by the National Board of Review and the American Film Institute, and received various accolades, including four wins at the 96th Academy Awards, two at the 81st Golden Globe Awards, and five at the 77th British Academy Film Awards; Stone won Best Actress at each ceremony.

== Plot ==
In a retrofuturist alternative late-Victorian London, 1882, (Note: The period of the film is "difficult to pin" as various futuristic and fantasy elements are included in the cityscapes of Lisbon and Alexandria. In addition, Tower Bridge was not opened until 1894.) the medical student Max McCandles is recruited by the mad scientist Godwin Baxter to record the behaviour of a strange, nearly mute woman living in Godwin's house. Godwin reveals that her body is that of a pregnant woman who died by suicide by leaping off Tower Bridge; Godwin replaced the woman's brain with that of the fetus, giving her an infant's mind. He gave her the name Bella Baxter.

As weeks pass, Bella's vocabulary improves and she exhibits childlike wonder at the world. With Godwin's encouragement, Max falls in love with Bella and proposes marriage. Bella accepts, but soon discovers masturbation and sexual pleasure, leading her to run off with Duncan Wedderburn, a debauched lawyer, to Lisbon. There, they have near-constant intercourse because Bella has no understanding of anything beyond physical pleasure. A fellow hotel guest addresses her as "Victoria Blessington".

As Bella becomes difficult for Duncan to control, he smuggles her onto a cruise ship, where she befriends two passengers who open her mind to philosophy. Duncan attempts to further stunt her growth to no avail, and indulges in drinking and gambling. During a stop at Alexandria, Bella witnesses the suffering of the poor and becomes distraught. Wishing to help them, she entrusts Duncan's winnings to unscrupulous members of the crew, who falsely promise to give the money to the poor.

Unable to afford the rest of the trip, Bella and Duncan are dropped off at Marseille and make their way to Paris, penniless. Seeking money and accommodation, Bella begins working at a brothel. Enraged, Duncan breaks down, and Bella abandons him. At the brothel, she comes under the tutelage of Madame Swiney and begins a relationship with fellow prostitute Toinette, who introduces her to socialism.

Now terminally ill, Godwin asks Max to bring Bella to him. Max finds her after tracking down Duncan, who has been institutionalised. Back in London, Bella reconciles with Godwin and renews her plans to marry Max, but their wedding is interrupted by Duncan and General Alfie Blessington. Alfie, addressing Bella as Victoria, declares that they were married before her disappearance and that he has come to reclaim her. Bella leaves Max to learn of her past life, but is exposed to Alfie's violent and sadistic nature. Bella partially realises that she was Victoria, and that she killed herself to escape Alfie.

Alfie then confines Bella to his mansion and tells her that he plans to have her clitoris removed and impregnate her, threatening her with a gun and demanding she drink a sedative. She tosses the sedative in his face. Alfie accidentally shoots himself in the foot and passes out. Bella returns to Godwin's house and, with Max's help, transplants a goat's brain into Alfie's head. Godwin dies peacefully with Bella and Max at his side. Bella, Max, and Toinette begin a new life in Godwin's house, while Alfie happily eats grass.

== Cast ==
- Emma Stone as Bella Baxter/Victoria Blessington
- Mark Ruffalo as Duncan Wedderburn
- Willem Dafoe as Dr. Godwin Baxter
- Ramy Youssef as Max McCandles
- Christopher Abbott as Alfie Blessington
- Suzy Bemba as Toinette
- Jerrod Carmichael as Harry Astley
- Kathryn Hunter as Madame Swiney
- Vicki Pepperdine as Mrs. Prim
- Margaret Qualley as Felicity
- Hanna Schygulla as Martha von Kurtzroc
- Keeley Forsyth as Allison the maid
- John Locke as David the butler
- Kate Handford as Kitty
- Owen Good as Gerald
- Damien Bonnard as Father
- Tom Stourton as Steward
- Raphaël Thiéry as Saveur the butcher
- Wayne Brett as Priest
- Carminho as Fado singing woman
- Jerskin Fendrix as Lisbon restaurant musician

== Production ==
=== Development ===
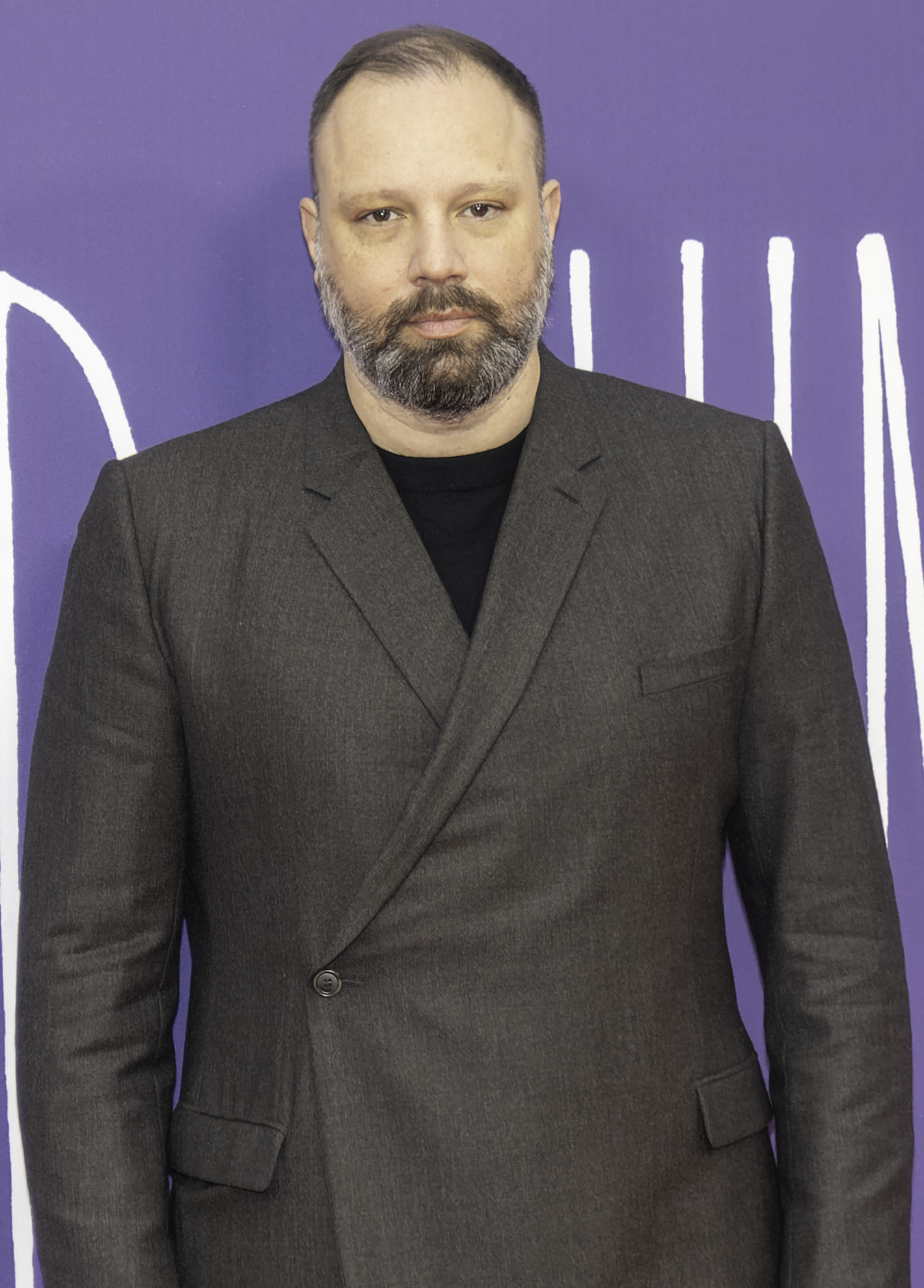
Director and co-producer Yorgos Lanthimos

Produced by Film4 Productions, Element Pictures, and Searchlight Pictures, development on the film began as early as 2009, when Lanthimos went to Scotland to discuss the acquisition of the rights to Poor Things with the author, Alasdair Gray. "He was a very lovely man", Lanthimos said. "Unfortunately, he died just a couple of years before we actually made the film, but he was very special and energetic; he was 80-something [when we met], and as soon as I got there, he had seen Dogtooth and said, 'I had my friend put on the DVD, because I don't know how to operate these things, but I think you're very talented, young man.'" Lanthimos said Gray took him on a personal tour of Glasgow, where Gray showed him several places he had incorporated into the story.

While filming The Favourite (2018), Lanthimos revisited the project, which he discussed with Emma Stone, who starred in that film. He began developing Poor Things more actively after the success of The Favourite: "After the relative success of The Favourite, where I actually made a slightly more expensive film that was successful, people were more inclined to allow me to do whatever it is that I wanted, so I just went back to Gray's book and said, 'This is what I want to do.' It was a long process, but the book was always on my mind." While developing the film, Lanthimos and Stone collaborated on the short film Bleat (2022).

=== Pre-production ===
Poor Things was announced in February 2021. Lanthimos said that working with Stone again gave him an advantage, as they had developed a mutual trust. Stone also discussed how the process of making Poor Things was different from making The Favourite because she also acted as a producer: "It was so interesting to be involved in how the film was being pieced together, from cast to department heads to what have you. Ultimately, Yorgos was the one making those decisions, but I was very involved in the process, which started during the pandemic; we were reaching out to people and casting and everything during that time, because we couldn't go anywhere."

=== Casting ===
Willem Dafoe entered negotiations to join the cast in March 2021. In April, Ramy Youssef was in talks to join. Dafoe and Youssef were confirmed to join in May, with Mark Ruffalo and Jerrod Carmichael also added to the cast. In September, Christopher Abbott was cast. In November, Margaret Qualley and Suzy Bemba were cast, with Kathryn Hunter also revealing she had a role in the film.

In preparation for her role, Stone took dance lessons and accidentally dyed her hair black. Lanthimos liked the contrast between the dark hair and Stone's fair complexion. Stone said she was attracted to the idea of portraying a woman reborn with a liberated mindset free from societal pressures:

It's such a fairy tale, and a metaphor—clearly, this can't actually happen—but the idea that you could start anew as a woman, as this body that's already formed, and see everything for the first time and try to understand the nature of sexuality, or power, or money or choice, the ability to make choices and live by your own rules and not society's—I thought that was a really fascinating world to go into.

Stone especially appreciated Bella's lack of shame:

Even though Bella has obviously been through trauma in her life, it just isn't there for her now. She was the most joyous character in the world to play, because she has no shame about anything. She's new, you know? I've never had to build a character before that didn't have things that had happened to them or had been put on them by society throughout their lives. It was an extremely freeing experience to be her.

Youssef said that to prepare for their roles, he and Dafoe attended mortician school. Reflecting on the "experimental theater games" Lanthimos assigned the cast before filming, Dafoe said, "You're very patient with everyone, and everyone's patient with you. They need to be confident in what they're doing, because what we're doing is quite risky. It's not a normal film." Dafoe spent six hours each day in the hair and makeup department—four hours having extensive prosthetics applied to his face at the start of the day and two hours to remove it at the end.

Discussing the male characterizations, Lanthimos acknowledged that while each male character was different and had his own motivation, they all reflected male attitudes typical of the story's Victorian setting. He said:

There are variations, I guess, but in this film, there's a general tendency to try to control [Bella]—even if it's done in a caring or subtle way, in the way that a parent might or that [Dafoe's character] Baxter does, or just being infatuated in the way that Ramy is. You know, being a nice man deep down, but still having the characteristics of a man of that era.

Stone also said that "the more agency Bella gets, the more she learns and grows, the more it drives these men insane. The more she has an opinion and her own wants and needs and all of that, it makes them crazy; they want her to stay this sort of pure thing."

=== Filming ===
Principal photography began in August 2021, primarily on soundstages at Origo Studios in Budapest, Hungary. Sequences in Alfie Blessington's house were shot at the Metropolitan Ervin Szabó Library in Budapest. Scenes set at a church in London were filmed at a church on the outskirts of Budapest. Filming wrapped in December 2021. Poor Things is the first feature film to be partially shot on Kodak's 35mm Ektachrome color reversal motion picture film stock since its revival in 2018.

=== Influences ===
According to cinematographer Robbie Ryan, Francis Ford Coppola's film Bram Stoker's Dracula (1992) served as the main source of inspiration to everyone making the picture. Other films that served as influences were Michael Powell and Emeric Pressburger's Black Narcissus (1947), Federico Fellini's And The Ship Sails On (1983), and several films by Roy Andersson.

=== Costumes ===
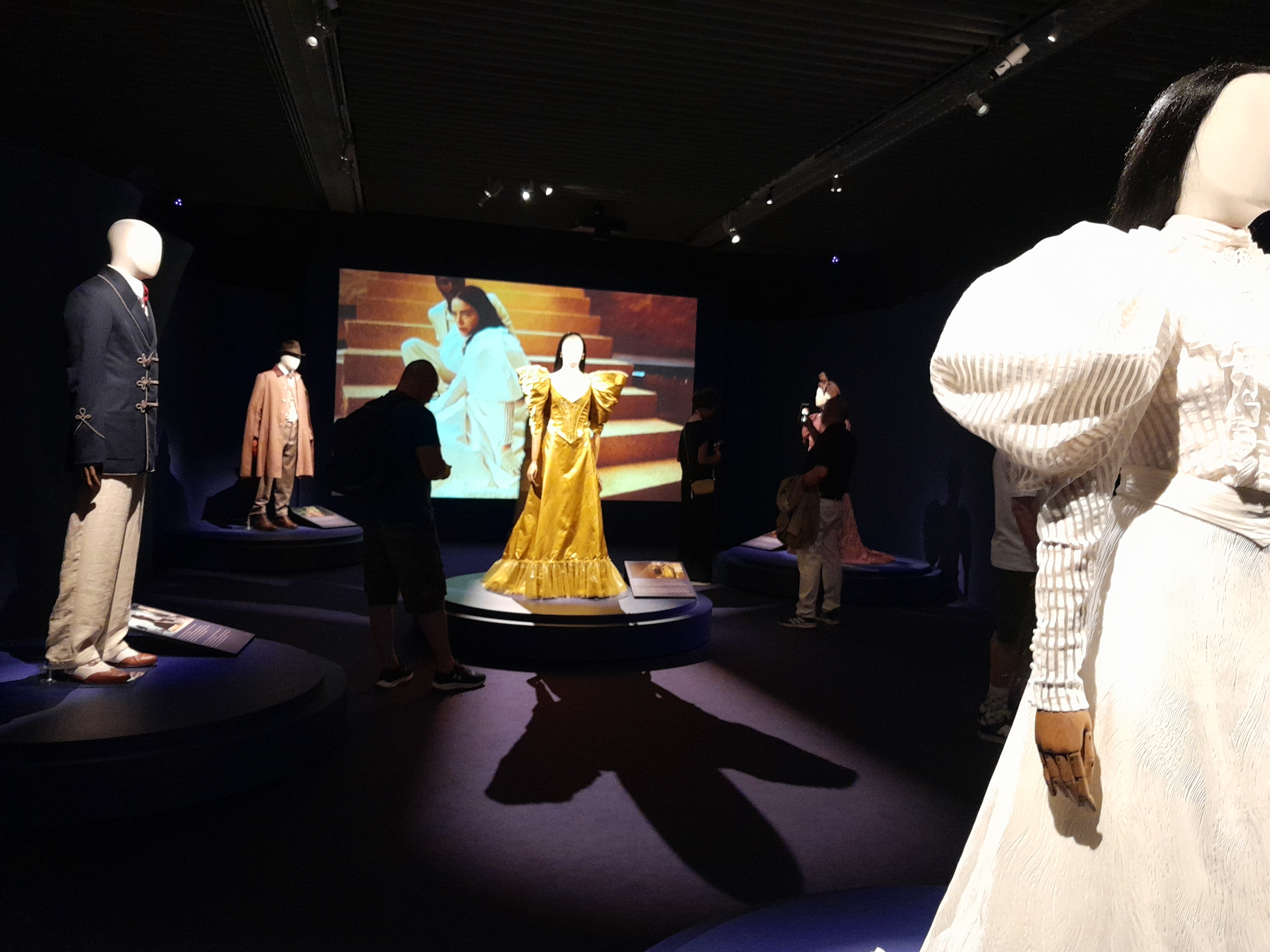
Some of the film's costumes in an exhibit at the Benaki Museum, Athens

Lanthimos worked closely with costume designer Holly Waddington to reflect Bella's growth and development through her wardrobe, from the more puffy silhouettes of her childlike era to the nearly corseted gown she wears at the film's climax. Stone elaborated on Bella's growth as reflected through her costumes, noting how at the beginning of the story she dresses in more traditional clothing and dresses more bizarrely as she transforms. She said:

I loved that element of, how would Bella put clothing together with the way her mind works at this point? At the end, there are these very military-looking dresses that look like nothing you've seen Bella wear; things are much more form-fitting and constrained, but that's because she's come to a place where she's grown and decided who she is and what she's going to do. She's not assimilating, necessarily, but there's just more structure there.

=== Music ===
Poor Things was the first film scored by the pop musician Jerskin Fendrix. Milan Records released the soundtrack album in conjunction with the film's release date, December 8, 2023. Two singles, "Bella" and "Lisbon", were released on November 14.

== Genre ==
David Rooney of The Hollywood Reporter called Poor Things "genre-defying." Critics have described its genre as a sex comedy, gothic comedy, black comedy, and an absurdist comedy. Some noted steampunk elements in the visual design. It has also been described by English scholars as a work of science fiction.

== Release and reception ==
Poor Things had its world premiere at the 80th Venice International Film Festival on September 1, 2023, and also screened at the Telluride Film Festival, the New York Film Festival, the BFI London Film Festival, the Busan International Film Festival, and the Sitges Film Festival. The film had a limited theatrical release by Searchlight Pictures in the United States on December 8, 2023, and began a wide release on December 22, 2023. It was released in Ireland and the United Kingdom on January 12, 2024. It was previously scheduled to be released on September 8, 2023, but was delayed by the 2023 SAG-AFTRA strike, taking the original release date of Magazine Dreams.

=== Home media ===
Poor Things was released on digital platforms on February 27, 2024, and became available for streaming on Hulu in the U.S. on March 7 and on Disney+ in Canada the same day. The film was released by Walt Disney Studios Home Entertainment on Blu-ray and DVD on March 12.

=== Box office ===
Poor Things grossed $34.6 million in the United States and Canada, and $82.6 million in other territories, for a worldwide total of $117.2 million.

In its limited opening weekend, it made $644,000 from nine theaters, a per-venue average of $71,556 (the third-best of 2023). Expanding to 82 theaters the following weekend, it made $2.2 million, finishing 10th. In its third weekend it made $2.4 million from 800 theaters, and a total of $3.4 million over the four-day Christmas frame. Following its 11 Oscar nominations, it expanded from 900 theaters to 2,300 in its eighth week of release and made $3.08 million, an increase of 43% from the previous weekend. The next weekend it made $2.2 million.

=== Critical response ===
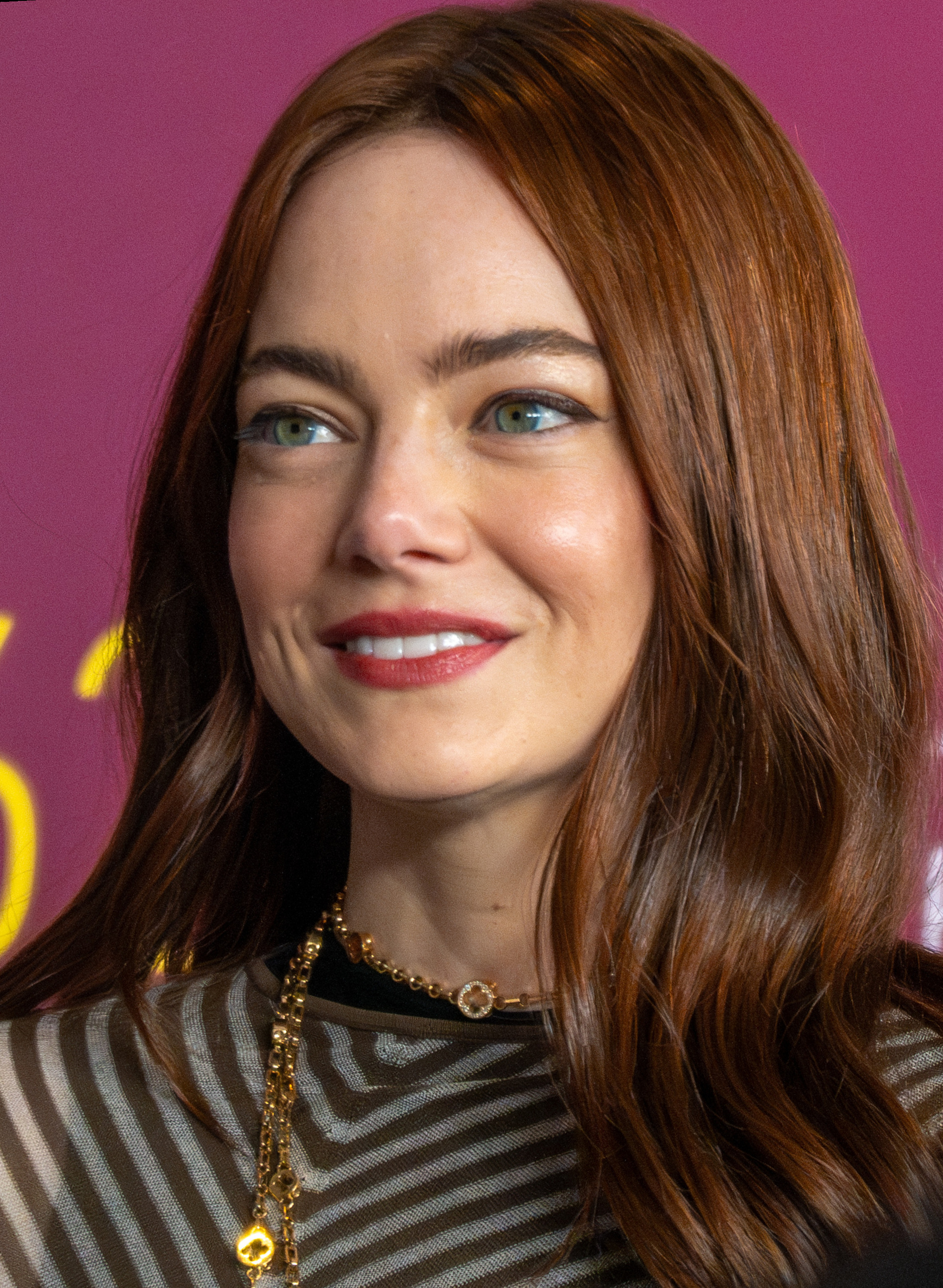
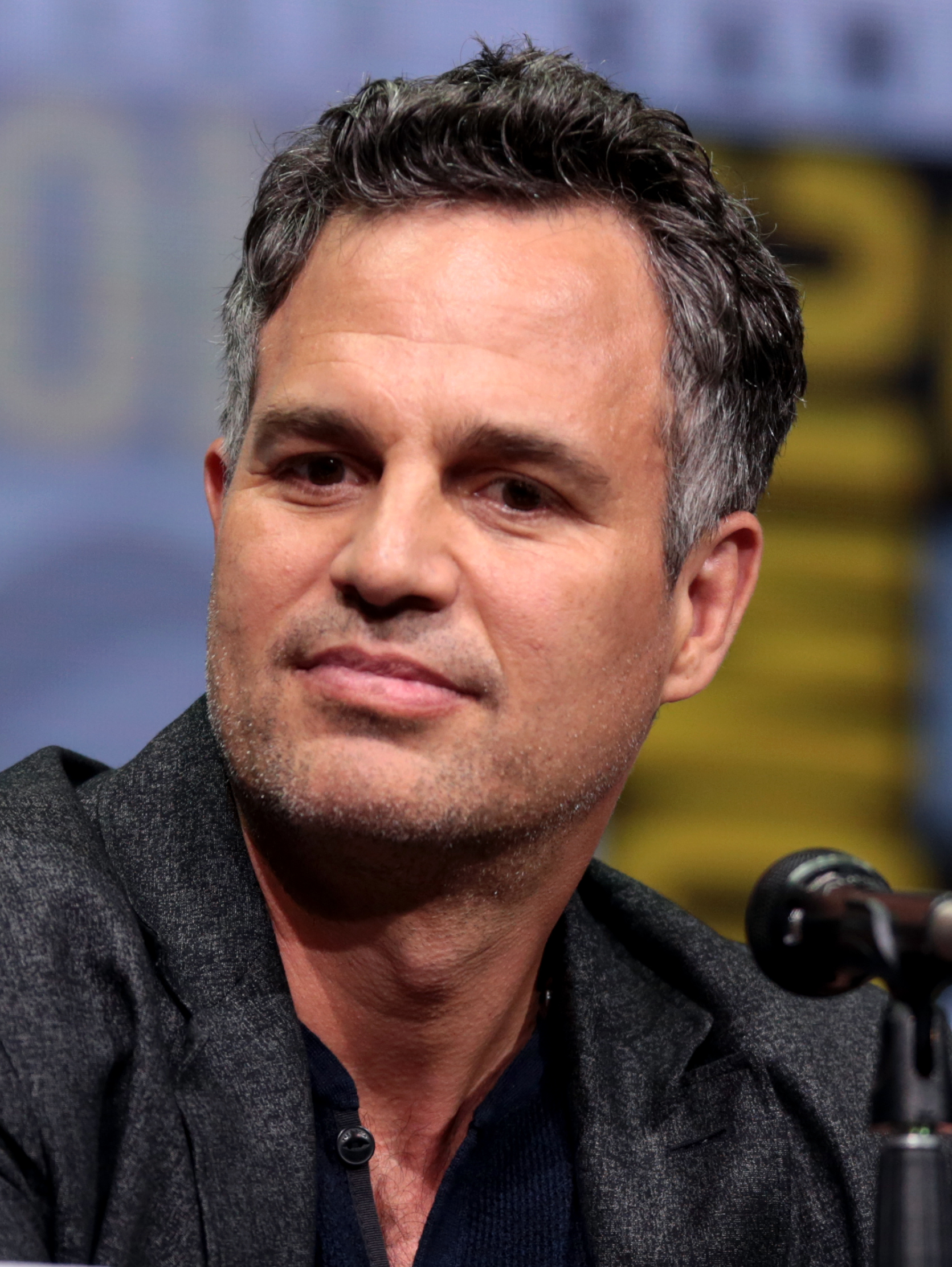
Emma Stone and Mark Ruffalo garnered critical acclaim for their performances and earned Academy Award nominations for Best Actress and Best Supporting Actor, with Stone winning.

On the review aggregator website Rotten Tomatoes, 92% of 379 critics' reviews are positive, with an average rating of 8.6/10. The website's consensus reads: "Wildly imaginative and exhilaratingly over the top, Poor Things is a bizarre, brilliant tour de force for director Yorgos Lanthimos and star Emma Stone." Metacritic, which uses a weighted average, assigned the film a score of 88 out of 100, based on 62 critics, indicating "universal acclaim". Audiences polled by CinemaScore gave the film an average grade of "A−" on an A+ to F scale, while 68% of those polled by PostTrak called the film "excellent", with 75% saying they would definitely recommend it. Glamour wrote that the film "received widespread critical acclaim following its world premiere" and that Stone was "praised for her hilariously bold and fearless sex scenes" in it.

Stephanie Zacharek of Time wrote that Poor Things is "Lanthimos' finest film so far, a strange, gorgeous-looking picture that extends generosity both to its characters and the audience". She called Stone's performance "wonderful—vital, exploratory, almost lunar in its perfect oddness". Peter Bradshaw of The Guardian called it a "virtuoso comic epic" and added that Stone had given a "hilarious, beyond-next-level performance". David Rooney of The Hollywood Reporter termed it "an insanely enjoyable fairy tale", adding that Stone "gorges on it in a fearless performance that traces an expansive arc most actors could only dream about". Variety's Guy Lodge also wrote that the film "rests on a single astonishing performance by Stone".

BBC Culture's Nicholas Barber found the film "outrageous and hilarious", comparing it to the work of Wes Anderson and Terry Gilliam. The review also noted that the novel's realistic 19th-century setting had been changed to a fantastical "steam-punk wonderland", and that some of its satirical humor and most of its socialist and feminist themes had been toned down. Reviews by The Guardian, Variety and Entertainment Weekly also emphasize the setting's steampunk elements. Manohla Dargis, chief critic of The New York Times, was not as impressed. She felt the story became more "monotonal, flat and dull" over time, writing that the movie's "design is rich, its ideas thin. … It isn't long into Poor Things that you start to feel as if you were being bullied into admiring a film that's so deeply self-satisfied there really isn't room for the two of you". But Dargis too lauded Stone's acting.

Filmmakers such as Michael Mann, A. V. Rockwell, Joe Dante, Chloe Domont, Robert Eggers, Kitty Green, Chad Hartigan, Matt Johnson, Zoe Lister-Jones, James Ponsoldt and Jeff Rowe also praised the film.

In June 2025, IndieWire ranked the film at number 88 on its list of "The 100 Best Movies of the 2020s (So Far)." In July 2025, it was one of the films voted for the "Readers' Choice" edition of The New York Times' list of "The 100 Best Movies of the 21st Century," finishing at number 106.

Ramin Setoodeh and Zack Sharf in Variety wrote, "Not everyone loved Poor Things. A stream of [Venice] theatergoers bolted for the exit during some of the racier scenes." Mick LaSalle at the San Francisco Chronicle called the film "a 141-minute mistake", writing, "Worst of all, it's dishonest. It purports to be a feminist document, but it defines a woman's autonomy as the ability to be exploited and not care. ... What version of feminism are these guys—Lanthimos and screenwriter Tony McNamara—trying to sell us here?" Film critic Scott Mantz applauded LaSalle's post, finding the film "a seriously misguided take on female empowerment", though he praised the film's ambition and production values.

Angelica Jade Bastién of Vulture warned readers, "This isn't a sincere treatise on female sexuality, it's a dark comedy for people who carry around an NPR tote bag", and criticized the film for failing to take a "sincere interest in the interior conflicts" of its protagonist. Bastién identified the decision to make Bella Baxter mentally a child as the "primary failure of Poor Things' sex scenes", citing Bella's depiction as an example of the "born sexy yesterday" trope. "In many ways", she wrote, "the film demonstrates the limits of the modern cis-male auteur's vision for and about women—particularly their sexual selves." Praise was saved for Holly Waddington's costuming, which Bastién called "the greatest triumph of the film".

The film has been subject to scrutiny in Gray's native Scotland due to its seeming disregard for the source material and its Scottish roots, with online documentary channel Ossian presenting a portrayal of the true origins of Poor Things and its Scottish setting. Those closest to Gray have suggested that Lanthimos's interpretation of the source material was something Gray agreed to in the early 2010s, when contractual terms for a screenplay were drawn up.

=== Accolades ===
Poor Things won the Golden Lion at the 80th Venice International Film Festival. At the 96th Academy Awards, it received 11 nominations, including Best Picture, and won 4 awards, including Best Actress for Stone. At the 81st Golden Globe Awards, it received seven nominations and won Best Motion Picture – Musical or Comedy and Best Actress – Motion Picture Musical or Comedy for Stone. At the 29th Critics' Choice Awards, it received 13 nominations, winning for Best Actress. It received 11 nominations at the 77th British Academy Film Awards and won 5 awards, including for Best Actress in a Leading Role. The American Film Institute and the National Board of Review named Poor Things one of 10 best films of the year.
