= On Becoming a Guinea Fowl =

2024 film by Rungano Nyoni

- Theatrical release poster
- Directed by: Rungano Nyoni
- Written by: Rungano Nyoni
- Produced by: Ed Guiney; Andrew Lowe; Tim Cole
- Starring: Susan Chardy; Elizabeth Chisela; Henry B.J. Phiri
- Cinematography: David Gallego
- Edited by: Nathan Nugent
- Music by: Lucrecia Dalt
- Production companies: Element Pictures; A24; Fremantle; BBC Film
- Distributed by: Picturehouse Entertainment (United Kingdom and Ireland); A24 (United States)
- Release dates: May 16, 2024 (Cannes); December 6, 2024 (United Kingdom and Ireland); March 7, 2025 (United States)
- Running time: 99 minutes
- Countries: Ireland; United Kingdom; United States; Zambia
- Languages: English; Bemba
- Box office: $237,397

On Becoming a Guinea Fowl is a 2024 drama film written and directed by Rungano Nyoni, and starring Susan Chardy, Elizabeth Chisela and Henry B.J. Phiri. It is a co-production between Ireland, the United Kingdom, the United States, and Zambia.

The film competed in the Un Certain Regard section at the 77th Cannes Film Festival on 16 May 2024, where Nyoni won the section's Best Director award. It was released in the United Kingdom and Ireland on December 6, 2024, by Picturehouse Entertainment, and was released in the United States on March 7, 2025, by A24.

== Plot ==
Driving home from a party, Shula finds her Uncle Fred dead in the road near a brothel, and has a brief vision of herself as a young girl. She calls her father, who tells her to stay near the body until the police come in the morning, and also asks her for money. Her cousin Nsansa, who is drunk, also happens across the body, but Shula is reluctant to let her into her car. The next day she goes home to rest, but her relatives come to empty out her home of possessions as the family will be congregating there for the funeral. She is harangued by her aunties for washing on a funeral day and pressured to pick her mother, one of Fred's sisters, up from the airport.

As the funeral goes on, Shula becomes increasingly distressed by the hatred for Fred's widow. She is forbidden from bringing the widow food, as Fred's family believe that he died because she did not take proper care of him. Shula and Nsansa go to see Bupe, their cousin, who is staying at a college dorm. On the way, Nsansa laughingly recalls how Fred attempted to abuse her, but could not get an erection. She says she hit him and made him run away. They arrive at the dorm and find Bupe has taken an overdose.

Bupe is hospitalised, and Shula finds a confession on her phone saying that Fred had been serially abusing her. Bupe's mother says to keep quiet about Fred's behaviour. Shula struggles to sleep as she remembers an educational children's TV show that talked about the guinea fowl.

The next day, Shula is sent to dictate an obituary, but she is haunted by Bupe's confession. She returns home and is shocked to find that Bupe has discharged herself and is now making food for the family. Bupe shrugs off the confession, saying that Fred is dead and it is in the past. Shula tries to find Bupe's mother, but is waylaid by various men demanding her to serve them food. She finds Bupe has overdosed again and is taken to the hospital. Back at the house, Nsansa admits that her story was a lie — Fred did actually abuse her. Shula goes for a walk and talks to Fred's widow. The widow says that she cannot charge her cellphone because it is an old model with a rare cable, and she left it at Fred's home.

The following morning, Shula goes to retrieve the cable, and meets Fred's seven children, who are being looked after by their maternal grandmother. Shula realises from the children's age that Fred's widow was only 11 or 12 when she first got pregnant. When the grandmother learns that Shula is on Fred's side of the family, she falls to her knees and begs Shula to tell them not to take the house from Fred's widow, as they have nowhere to raise the children.

Shula goes to her father, who is having a party. She asks him why nobody is speaking up about Fred, but he is unconcerned, and says since he is dead there is no point. He asks her for more money. As she walks away, a thought occurs to him — he calls her cell phone and asks if Fred abused her. She says he did not. She goes to her mother and asks why she told all of Shula's aunties about the abuse, but not her dad. Her mother says that the aunties talked to Fred and he assured them he would not do it again. Her mother, seemingly unbothered by any of this, tells her to gather more food for the funeral dinner.

Shula drinks in the kitchen cupboard with Nsansa when the aunties step in and assure her that they love her and they do not want harm to come to her. Outside, Shula discovers that the widow and her family have been made to sleep in the empty swimming pool. Nsansa mentions Shula watching a children's TV show about guinea fowl one day while holding a hot water bottle to her belly. Nsansa says that was the day Shula decided she hated Uncle Fred. She asks if Shula is all right, and Shula just nods. Shula and Nsansa go to Bupe's hospital window, climb in and hug her to sleep.

Shula remembers watching the TV show about the guinea fowl. In it, the host explains that the guinea fowl is very important in protecting the other animals, because it makes a loud noise when predators are near.

At the house, the men of the family hold a court in which Fred's relatives tell the widow that she failed him. The widow says she tried to stop him drinking after he was hospitalised, but he did not listen to her. The men decide that her family should pay a sum of money and give up the house and Fred's possessions. The family members begin to fight over ownership of the items. Outside, Shula arrives with Fred's children and begins to screech the sound of a guinea fowl.

== Cast ==
- Susan Chardy as Shula
- Blessings Bhamjee as Young Shula
- Elizabeth Chisela as Nsansa
- Henry B.J. Phiri as Dad
- Roy Chisha as Uncle Fred

== Production ==
The film is written and directed by Rungano Nyoni and developed by BBC Film and Element Pictures. It was shot in Lusaka, Zambia. Financing came from A24 alongside BBC Film and Fremantle. David Gallego is the cinematographer on the project, and Malin Lindholm is the production designer. Producers include Ed Guiney and Andrew Lowe for Element Pictures. Production was reported to have begun in October 2022.

== Release ==
The film had its world premiere at the 2024 Cannes Film Festival in the Un Certain Regard section on May 16, 2024. It also screened at the 2024 Toronto International Film Festival on September 5, 2024, 2024 New York Film Festival on October 3, 2024, the BFI London Film Festival, and the MAMI Mumbai Film Festival 2024.

It was originally scheduled to be released by A24 in the United States on December 13, 2024, but was delayed to March 7, 2025. In October 2024, it was announced that Picturehouse Entertainment had acquired UK and Irish distribution rights to the film, scheduling it for a release on December 6, 2024.

The film became available to stream on Max starting July 4, 2025.

== Reception ==
=== Critical response ===
On the review aggregator website Rotten Tomatoes, 100% of 104 critics' reviews are positive, with an average rating of 8.4/10. The website's consensus reads: "A vibrant exploration of family and social mores, On Becoming a Guinea Fowl marks another superb effort from writer-director Rungano Nyoni." Metacritic, which uses a weighted average, assigned the film a score of 87 out of 100, based on 28 critics, indicating "universal acclaim".

Katie Rife of The A.V. Club gave the film an A and described it as "still very much an art film, however, one that refuses to hold the viewer's hand. Instead, [Nyoni] soaks her film in gasoline and hands us a match." Ty Burr of The Washington Post gave the film 3.5 out of 4 stars and wrote, "Nyoni lets the visual and thematic pieces of her film’s dramatic puzzle fall into place gradually."

=== Accolades ===
The film was nominated for Best British Independent Film and Best Director at the British Independent Film Awards in November 2024, with Chardy winning the 2024 British Independent Film Award for Breakthrough Performance.

Award	Ceremony date	Category	Recipient(s)	Result	Ref.
Cannes Film Festival	24 May 2024	Un Certain Regard	Rungano Nyoni	Nominated	
Cannes Film Festival	24 May 2024	Un Certain Regard – Best Director (Note: Shared with Roberto Minervini for The Damned.)	Rungano Nyoni	Won	
Zurich Film Festival	12 October 2024	Golden Eye Feature Film Competition	On Becoming a Guinea Fowl	Won	
Film Independent Spirit Awards	15 February 2026	Best International Film	Rungano Nyoni	Nominated	
