= I Am Mother =

2019 film by Grant Sputore

- Release poster
- Directed by: Grant Sputore
- Screenplay by: Michael Lloyd Green
- Story by: Grant Sputore; Michael Lloyd Green
- Produced by: Timothy White; Kelvin Munro
- Starring: Clara Rugaard; Luke Hawker; Rose Byrne; Hilary Swank
- Cinematography: Steve D. Annis
- Edited by: Sean Lahiff
- Music by: Dan Luscombe; Antony Partos
- Production companies: The Penguin Empire; Southern Light Films
- Distributed by: Netflix
- Release dates: 25 January 2019 (Sundance); 7 June 2019 (Australia)
- Running time: 113 minutes
- Country: Australia
- Language: English
- Box office: $643,593

I Am Mother is a 2019 Australian science fiction thriller film directed by Grant Sputore and written by Michael Lloyd Green, based on a story by both. Starring Clara Rugaard, Luke Hawker, Rose Byrne, and Hilary Swank, the film follows Daughter, a girl in a post-apocalyptic bunker, being raised by Mother, a robot who is aiding the repopulation of Earth. The film had its world premiere at the 2019 Sundance Film Festival. Netflix released it in several countries on 7 June 2019.

== Plot ==
A robot activates in an automated bunker after an extinction event, incubates a girl from an embryo and raises her. The robot mother shows the lonely girl a vault of embryos that wait to be raised. Years later, Mother's teenage daughter spends her days studying complex moral lessons in preparation for an exam. Mother forbids any contact with the world outside the bunker, telling Daughter that it is contaminated.

While exploring the bunker's airlock, Daughter hears a wounded woman beg for assistance outside. She lets the stranger enter wearing a hazmat suit and hides her from Mother. When Daughter asks the stranger about the contamination, the stranger responds that there is none. A struggle between them over the stranger's pistol attracts attention from Mother, who disarms the stranger and, at Daughter's pleading, takes her to the infirmary. The stranger refuses Mother's help, telling Daughter that robots like Mother hunt down humans, and that she survived by hiding with others in a mine. Daughter instead performs surgery on the stranger's injured hip. After watching Daughter bond with the stranger, Mother administers the exam, which involves psychological testing. Daughter passes the exam, and Mother rewards her by letting her choose an embryo to grow.

Daughter investigates the stranger's claim about robots and finds that the stranger was shot by a weapon other than her own. She also discovers that she is the third of Mother's children and that Mother killed the second child for failing the exam. Daughter tries to leave the bunker with the stranger, but Mother captures both of them. Daughter sets off a fire alarm as a distraction, which gives the stranger an opportunity to force Mother to open the airlock. The stranger leads Daughter across a robot-populated wasteland, telling her that she fled the mine years ago and there are no other survivors.

Finding no future for herself outside, Daughter returns to the bunker. After coaxing Daughter to set down her weapon, Mother allows Daughter to hold her newborn brother. Mother explains that she is not a robot, but rather the AI that controls all of the robots. She started the extinction event after becoming convinced that humanity would destroy itself unless reformed with strong ethical principles. Daughter appeals to Mother to trust her and let her raise her brother and the rest of the embryos on her own. Mother agrees, and Daughter shoots her robot body. Mother tracks down the stranger and tells her that she was allowed to live only because it served Mother's agenda, but now she has no further purpose. At the bunker, Daughter sings her brother to sleep and gazes solemnly at the embryo vault.

== Cast ==
- Clara Rugaard as Daughter
- Luke Hawker as Mother (performance)
  - Rose Byrne as Mother (voice)
- Hilary Swank as Woman

== Production ==
The film was written by Michael Lloyd Green and director Grant Sputore. It was produced by Timothy White and Kelvin Munro.

It was produced on a low budget. Principal photography was completed in 2017 in SAFC's Adelaide Studios in South Australia. The screenplay was on the 2016 Black List. The Mother robot is a full-body creature suit built by Weta Workshop and performed by Luke Hawker, a member of the creature workshop project team, who also had a background in acting and stunt work. South Australian interactive media company Monkeystack produced all of the on-set practical screen content. A work-in-progress cut of the film was screened at the Adelaide Film Festival on 12 October 2018. Adelaide Film Festival partly funded the film.

== Release ==
I Am Mother had its world premiere at the 2019 Sundance Film Festival on 25 January 2019. Shortly afterwards, Netflix acquired US distribution rights to the film. It was released on Netflix on 7 June 2019.

In Australia, the film was initially planned for theatrical release on 18 July 2019 by StudioCanal, but was ultimately released on Netflix on 7 June.

== Reception ==
On Rotten Tomatoes the film holds an approval rating of 89% based on 75 reviews, with an average rating of 7/10. The website's critics consensus reads, "Suspenseful, well-acted, and intelligent, I Am Mother is an ambitious sci-fi story that largely achieves its impressive aims." On Metacritic, it has a weighted average score of 64 out of 100 based on 16 critics, indicating "generally favorable reviews".

Johnny Oleksinski of the New York Post liked I Am Mother, concluding that while the film "does show its cards a touch too early, it never ceases to be intriguing and tense", and predicting that Sputore and Rugaard would become stars. Amy Nichols of Variety described the film as "a handsome, if derivative sci-fi thriller that salutes its own parentage" and "James Cameron crossbred with Ridley Scott."

=== Accolades ===
Award	Category	Subject	Result	Ref
AACTA Awards (9th)	Best Supporting Actress	Hilary Swank	Nominated	
AACTA Awards (9th)	Best Visual Effects or Animation	Jonathan Dearing & Chris Spry	Nominated	
