= The Dream Lands =

Upcoming British drama television series

- Based on: Dreamland by Rosa Rankin-Gee
- Screenplay by: Kayleigh Llewellyn
- Starring: Pascale Kann; Anna Friel; Connor Swindells; Clara Rugaard; Katherine Parkinson; Golda Rosheuvel
- Country of origin: United Kingdom
- Original language: English
- No. of series: 1
- No. of episodes: 4

Production
- Executive producers: Kayleigh Llewellyn; Naomi de Pear; Jane Featherstone; Holly Pullinger; Lucy Forbes; Rosa Rankin-Gee; Rebecca Ferguson
- Production companies: Sister; Universal International Studios

Original release
- Network: BBC One

The Dream Lands is an upcoming British drama series for BBC One. It is based on the book Dreamland by Rosa Rankin-Gee. It stars Pascale Kann as Chance, and features Anna Friel, Connor Swindells, Clara Rugaard and Katherine Parkinson.

== Cast ==
- Pascale Kann as Chance
- Anna Friel as Jas
- Connor Swindells as Kole
- Clara Rugaard as Franky
- Katherine Parkinson as Antonia
- Golda Rosheuvel as Iona
- Jacob Greenway
- Tareq Al-Jeddal
- Scarlett Rayner
- Ruby Bridle
- Raphael Sowole

== Production ==
The series was commissioned in February 2024, and is an adaptation of Rosa Rankin-Gee novel Dreamland. It is adapted by Kayleigh Llewellyn and produced by Sister for BBC One and BBC iPlayer. It is executive produced by Llewellyn, Naomi de Pear, Holly Pullinger, Lucy Forbes, author Rosa Rankin-Gee and Rebecca Ferguson. In February 2025, Universal International Studios (UIS) joined the project as co-producer with Sister.

Pascale Kann was confirmed as Chance in February 2025, with a cast including Katherine Parkinson, Connor Swindells and Anna Friel. The cast also includes Jacob Greenway, Tareq Al-Jeddal, Scarlett Rayner, Ruby Bridle, and Raphael Sowole.

Filming took place in Margate, Kent Filming locations also included Bristol during late 2024 and Weston-super-Mare during early 2025.
