= Mia Tharia =

English actress (born 2005)

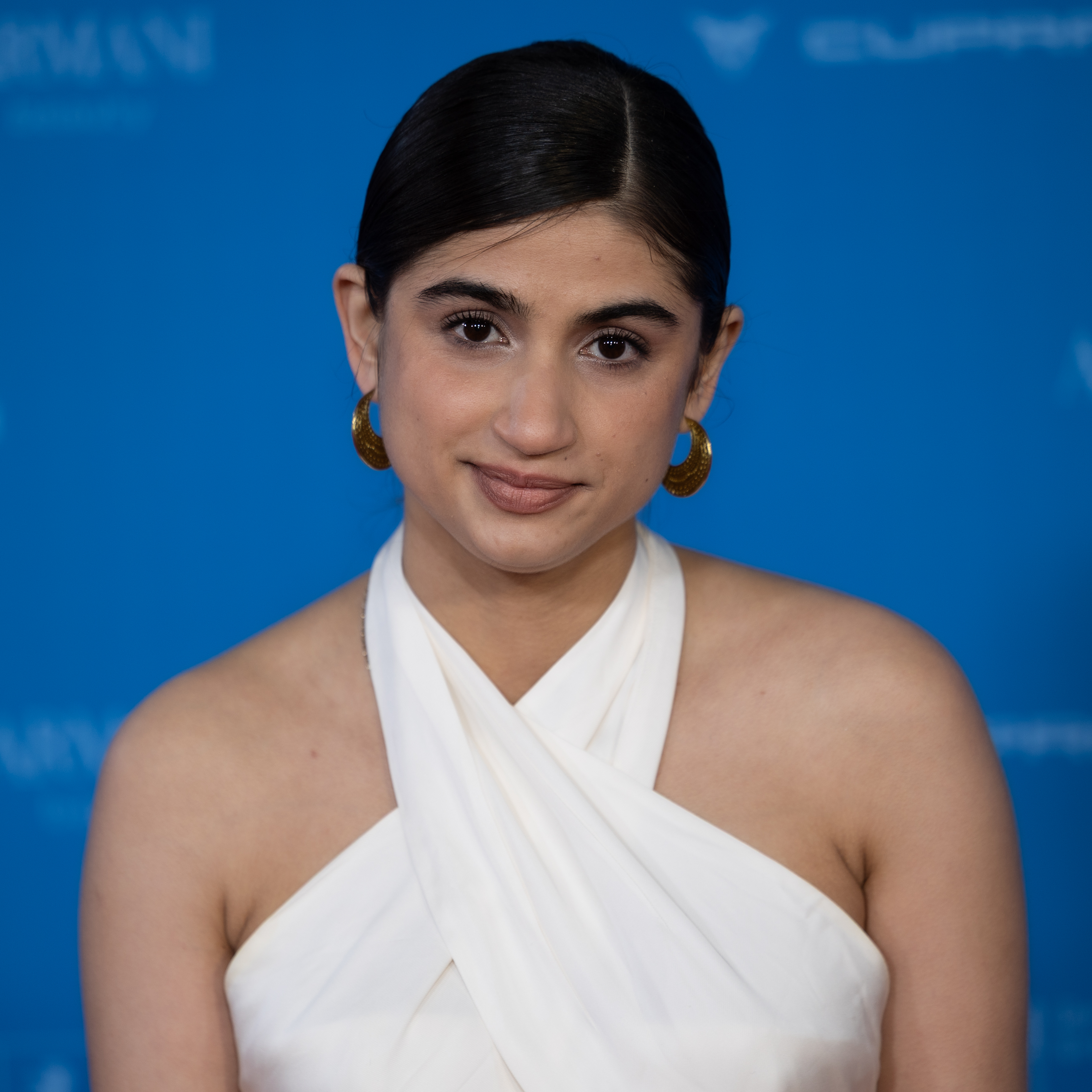
- Tharia in 2026
- Born: Mia Laura Tharia; May 2005 (age 21)
- Years active: 2018–present

Mia Laura Tharia (born May 2005) is an English actress and writer. On television, she is known for her roles in the BBC series Phoenix Rise (2023–2024) and The Listeners (2024). Her films include September Says (2024). She was named a 2024 Screen International Star of Tomorrow and a 2025 Brit to Watch by Variety.

== Early life and education ==
Tharia was born to an English mother, a psychologist, and a British Indian father, a scientist, and grew up in Balham, South London. She has an older sister. She attended Chestnut Grove Academy. As a teenager, she joined Brixton Youth Theatre and the Burnt Orange Theatre Company. Tharia was a finalist in Jack Petchey's 2020 Speak Out Challenge, having won the Wandsworth Regional Final with the speech Warrior, Not Worrier. In 2024, Tharia was selected for Burnt Orange's ZEST Writers' Collective. She also took part in the Royal Court Theatre's Methods of Writing workshop.

== Career ==
In 2023, Tharia made her television debut when she joined the cast of the BBC Three teen drama Phoenix Rise as Polly Shah. She would reprise her regular role in the second series before making recurring appearances in the third and fourth. The following year, Tharia made her feature film debut starring as July in Ariane Labed's directorial debut September Says, based on the novel Sisters by Daisy Johnson. The casting director discovered Tharia through Brixton Youth Theatre. The film premiered at the 77th Cannes Film Festival; she and her costar Pascale Kann were named arising Stars of the Festival by Vogue. In November, Tharia played Ashley in the BBC One thriller The Listeners with Rebecca Hall.

Tharia starred as the titular character of the 2026 film The Education of Jane Cumming and played Josie the film adaptation of Kazuo Ishiguro's Klara and the Sun. She has an upcoming role in the Apple TV series Disavowed.

== Filmography ==
=== Film ===
Year	Title	Role	Notes
2018	Cur:few	Tess	Short film
2024	September Says	July	
2026	The Education of Jane Cumming	Jane Cumming	
2026	Klara and the Sun	Josie	

=== Television ===
Year	Title	Role	Notes
2023–2024	Phoenix Rise	Polly Shah	22 episodes (series 1–2; guest 3–4)
2024	The Listeners	Ashley	4 episodes
