= Rosa Rankin-Gee =

British writer

- Born: 1986 (age 39–40); London, England
- Education: Durham University
- Occupations: Novelist, short story writer
- Writing career
- Notable works: The Last Kings of Sark; Dreamland; My Only Boy
- Notable awards: Paris Literary Prize (2011)

Rosa Rankin-Gee (born 1986) is an English novelist and short story writer. She is the author of the novella The Last Kings of Sark (2013) and the novels Dreamland (2021) and My Only Boy (2026).

== Early life and education ==
Rankin-Gee was brought up in Kensal Rise, London. She is the daughter of novelist Maggie Gee and writer and broadcaster Nicholas Rankin.

She studied modern languages at Durham University. Her first short story was published "by a fluke" in Esquire while she was still an undergraduate.

== Career ==
After leaving university, Rankin-Gee moved to Sark in the Channel Islands, where she worked as a private cook. Her debut novella, The Last Kings of Sark, won the inaugural Paris Literary Prize in 2011 and was published by Virago in 2013.

Her second book, Dreamland, was published in 2021. Set in a near-future Margate, the novel takes its title from the town's Dreamland amusement park. A television adaptation, The Dream Lands, is in production for the BBC.

Rankin-Gee's third work of fiction, My Only Boy, was published in 2026. It centres on a relationship between a lesbian woman and a gay man during a climate crisis.

== Bibliography ==
=== Fiction ===
- Rankin-Gee, Rosa (2013). The Last Kings of Sark. Virago. ISBN 9781844089314.
- ——— (2021). Dreamland. Scribner. ISBN 9781471193811.
- ——— (2026). My Only Boy. Scribner. ISBN 9781398547681.

=== Children's books ===
- Lye, Harriet Alida; Rankin-Gee, Rosa (2023). Serge, the Snail Without a Shell. Nimbus Publishing. ISBN 9781774711507.
