= Clara Rugaard =

Danish actress and singer (born 1997)

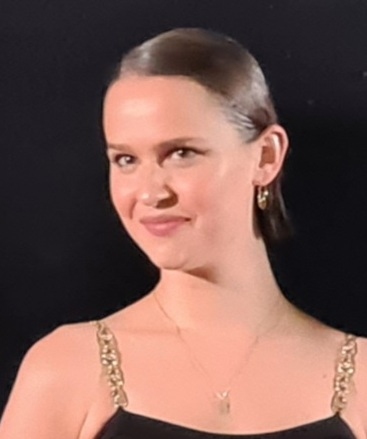
- Rugaard in 2021
- Born: Clara Rugaard-Larsen; 5 December 1997 (age 28); Copenhagen, Denmark
- Occupations: Actress; singer
- Years active: 2013–present
- Known for: I Am Mother

Clara Rugaard-Larsen (Danish: [ˈkʰlɑːʁɑ ˈʁuˀˌkɒˀ]; born 5 December 1997) is a Danish actress and singer.

== Early life ==
Rugaard was born in Copenhagen to a Danish father and a Northern Irish mother. Her father is in the Royal Danish Navy. She moved to London with her parents when her father was transferred there and stayed on when they moved back to Denmark.

== Career ==
Rugaard made her film debut in the 2013 Danish movie My African Adventure. Prior to this, she was known for singing the Danish theme song to Violetta for the Disney Channel. She also provided the English singing voice for Violetta (played by Martina Stoessel). Since her acting debut, she has appeared in the television series The Lodge and Still Star-Crossed, and multiple films, including Good Favour, Teen Spirit, and I Am Mother. Rugaard stars opposite Lewis Pullman, Danny Glover, and Lyrica Okano in the American film Press Play, directed by Greg Björkman.

She has received favorable reviews of her performance in I Am Mother, with SyFy describing her as the "heart, hope and humanity" of the film and The New York Post describing her as "a new sci-fi star".

== Filmography ==
=== Film ===
List of film appearances, with year, title, and role shown
Year	Title	Role	Refs./notes
2013	My African Adventure	Julie	
2017	Good Favour	Shosanna	
2018	Teen Spirit	Roxy	
2019	I Am Mother	Daughter	
2021	Love Gets a Room	Stefcia	
2022	Press Play	Laura	
2025	Juliet & Romeo	Juliet	

=== Television ===
List of television appearances, with year, title, and role shown
Year	Title	Role	Refs./notes
2016	The Lodge	Ana	2 episodes
2017	Still Star-Crossed	Juliet	3 episodes
2022	The Rising	Neve Kelly	8 episodes
2022	The Shift	Lærke	Episode: "April"
2023	Black Mirror	Mazey Day	Episode: "Mazey Day"
2025	The Crow Girl	Victoria Burkeman	6 episodes
2025	Toast	Beady	Miniseries
TBA	The Dream Lands	Franky	Filming
