= Screen Producers Ireland =

- Industry: Film; Television; Animation
- Headquarters: Republic of Ireland
- Area served: Ireland
- Website: www.screenproducersireland.com

Screen Producers Ireland is the national representative organisation of independent film, television and animation production companies and it exists primarily to advocate on behalf of its members. In 2012, then chief executive Barbara Galavan explained the role of the organisation as follows: SPI's role is to represent the views of our members to state, semi-state and industry bodies. We provide human resources and industrial relations supports producers; we negotiate collective agreements with the unions who work on behalf of film and television crews; and we also negotiate Terms of Trade agreements on behalf of our members, with the broadcasters, RTÉ and TG4. for instance.

There is a continuity between SPI and earlier organisations of Irish film producers, dating from the 1978 formation, the Irish Association of Independent Producers. In particular, the SPI was created in 2003 by the renaming of the Film Makers of Ireland, in order to reflect the fact that many of FMI's members were focused on the television sector.

Screen Producers Ireland organises a variety of events for its members, such as the 2008 training event in making pitches, which was a part of the Stranger than Fiction documentary festival that year.

The current chief executive officer is Susan Kirby.
