= Ed Guiney =

Irish-American film producer

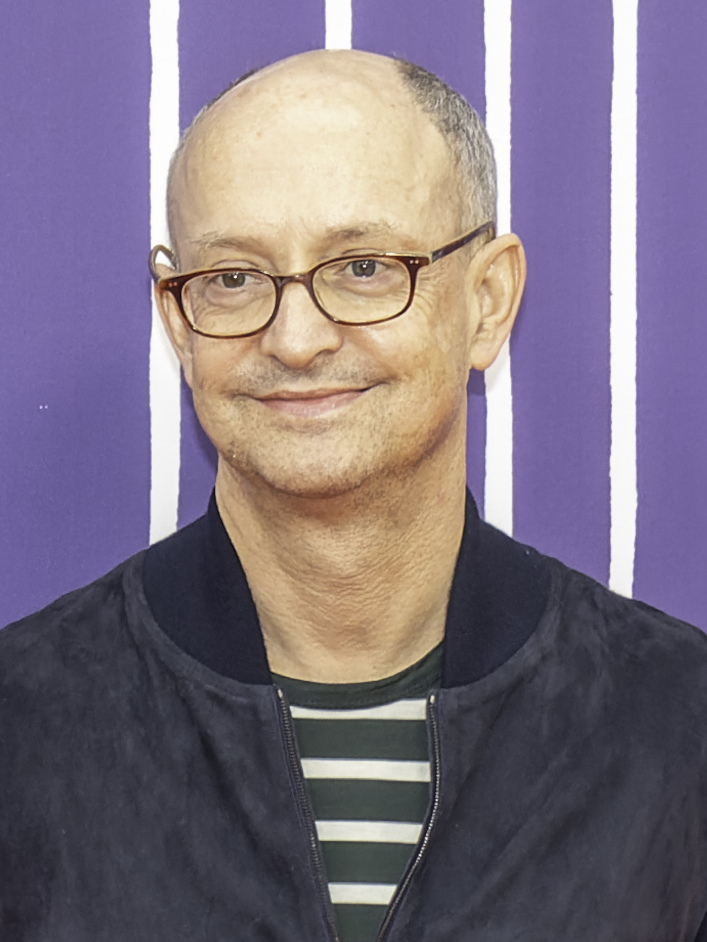
- Guiney in 2023
- Occupation: Film producer

Edward Michael Guiney is an Irish-American film producer and co-founder and co-CEO of film and television production company, Element Pictures. He won a British Academy Film Award and was nominated for four more in the categories Best Film and Outstanding British Film for the films The Favourite, The Wonder and Poor Things. He was also nominated for three Academy Awards in the category Best Picture.

In 2024, Ed Guiney founded STORYHOUSE, a non-profit festival centred around storytelling for film and television. Past panel members have included Academy Award winners Peter Straughan and Kenneth Lonergan.

== Filmography ==
=== Producer ===
- 1995: Guiltrip
- 2001: Disco Pigs
- 2004: Omagh
- 2005: Boy Eats Girl
- 2007: Garage
- 2011: The Guard
- 2012: Shadow Dancer
- 2012: What Richard Did
- 2014: Frank
- 2015: The Lobster
- 2015: Room
- 2017: The Killing of a Sacred Deer
- 2017: Disobedience
- 2018: The Favourite
- 2018: The Little Stranger
- 2020: Herself
- 2020: The Nest
- 2021: The Souvenir: Part II
- 2022: The Wonder
- 2022: The Eternal Daughter
- 2022: Chevalier
- 2023: Poor Things
- 2024: On Becoming a Guinea Fowl
- 2024: Kinds of Kindness
- 2024: September Says
- 2025: Bugonia
- 2025: My Father’s Shadow
- 2025: Pillion

=== Executive Producer ===
- 2002: The Magdalene Sisters
- 2004: Adam & Paul
- 2006: The Wind That Shakes The Barley
- 2018: Rosie

=== TV ===
- 2012: Ripper Street
- 2015: Red Rock
- 2019: Dublin Murders
- 2020: Normal People
- 2022: Conversations with Friends
- 2022: The Dry
- 2024: The Dry Season 2
- 2024: The Listeners
