= Shadow Dancer (2012 film) =

2012 film

- Film poster
- Directed by: James Marsh
- Written by: Tom Bradby
- Produced by: Chris Coen; Ed Guiney; Andrew Lowe
- Starring: Clive Owen; Andrea Riseborough; Gillian Anderson
- Cinematography: Rob Hardy
- Edited by: Jinx Godfrey
- Music by: Dickon Hinchliffe
- Production companies: BFI; BBC Films; Unanimous Entertainment; Element Pictures; Wild Bunch; Bord Scannán na hÉireann/Irish Film Board; UKFS
- Distributed by: Paramount Pictures (United Kingdom and Ireland); Wild Bunch Distribution (France)
- Release dates: 24 January 2012 (Sundance); 24 August 2012 (United Kingdom); 6 February 2013 (France)
- Running time: 102 minutes
- Countries: United Kingdom; Ireland; France
- Language: English
- Box office: $2.2 million

Shadow Dancer is a 2012 political thriller film directed by James Marsh and scripted by Tom Bradby, based on his 1998 novel of the same name. The film premiered at the 2012 Sundance Film Festival, and it was screened out of competition at the 62nd Berlin International Film Festival in February 2012.

== Plot ==
In the opening scene, set in 1973, the Troubles in Northern Ireland result in the death of Collette's younger brother when they are children.

The film jumps forward to 1993 London. After a failed bombing attack in London, Collette is arrested and offered a choice by an MI5 officer, Mac, who is assigned as her handler. Either she spends 25 years in jail, thus losing everything she loves, including her young son, or, she becomes an informant for MI5, spying on her own family. Collette agrees to inform. In return, Mac offers her a new identity after working for MI5.

Soon Mac learns that his superior Kate Fletcher is using Collette to protect Fletcher's own mole inside the Irish organization. Mac tries to find the identity of this informer to protect Collette. Additionally, a romantic interest develops between Mac and Collette, evidenced by a passionate kiss shared at their weekly meeting at a quay.

Meanwhile, Kevin, an IRA enforcer, realizing a mole exists within Collette's family, gets closer and closer to Collette. Mac's superiors refuse to remove her from danger. Finally, Kevin concludes that either Collette or her brother Connor is the mole. Gerry, Collette's oldest brother, gives passive consent for Kevin to interrogate Connor and Collette. Connor is tortured, but gives no information, and just as Connor is about to be executed, Kevin calls it off.

At the same time, Mac breaks into secret archives and determines that Fletcher's mole is Collette's mother, confirming that he has been used surreptitiously by his superiors, who were only interested in Collette as a shield for her mother's treachery. Mac makes a phone call to Collette's mother, informing her that the IRA will be coming to pick up Collette, and that Collette was recruited to protect her. However, when Kevin arrives to pick up Collette, her mother goes outside and enters Kevin's car. Later, her dead body is found, showing that Kevin had determined the mother was the mole.

Mac makes a phone call to Collette and apparently acting alone, outside the permission of his superiors, informs her that he can get her and her son out of Northern Ireland. Mac arrives at their usual meeting spot the quay, but Collette does not come. When he answers his car phone, the car explodes, killing him.

The film ends with Collette and her son getting into a car with her brother Connor. Connor tells Collette that "it's done" and they leave.

== Cast ==
- Andrea Riseborough as Collette McVeigh
- Clive Owen as Mac
- Gillian Anderson as Kate Fletcher
- Aidan Gillen as Gerry McVeigh
- Domhnall Gleeson as Connor McVeigh
- Brid Brennan as Ma
- David Wilmot as Kevin Mulville
- Michael McElhatton as Liam Hughes
- Stuart Graham as Ian Gilmour
- Martin McCann as Brendan O'Shea

== Reception ==
As of October 2021, the film holds an 84% approval rating on Rotten Tomatoes, based on 91 reviews with an average rating of 6.9/10. The website's critics consensus reads: "A tense, thought-provoking thriller, Shadow Dancer is bolstered by sensitive direction from James Marsh and a terrific performance from Andrea Riseborough." According to Metacritic, which sampled the opinions of 23 critics and calculated an average score of 71 out of 100, the film received "generally favorable reviews".

Film magazine Empire, giving it a score of 4 out of 5 stars, called it "an intelligent and emotionally charged spy drama". The Guardian called it "a slow-burning but brilliant thriller about an IRA sympathiser forced to become an informant by MI5".
