= Element Pictures =

Irish film studio, cinema and television production company

- Type: Subsidiary
- Industry: Film; Television
- Founded: 2001; 25 years ago
- Founder: Ed Guiney; Andrew Lowe
- Headquarters: Dublin, Ireland
- Key people: Ed Guiney; Andrew Lowe
- Products: Feature films; Television series
- Parent: Fremantle (2022–present)
- Website: elementpictures.ie

Element Pictures is an Irish film and television production and distribution company with production and distribution credits in more than 30 films. as well as a number of television series. Element Pictures also had a film and television distribution arm, which was later spun off under the name Volta Pictures.

== History ==
Element Pictures was founded in 2001 by Ed Guiney and Andrew Lowe.

The company often co-produces with or arranges funding from Irish governmental organizations such as Screen Ireland, as well as from BBC Film and Film4 in the United Kingdom and US companies A24 and Searchlight Pictures.

The company has operated Light House Cinema since January 2012, and the Pálas Cinema in Galway from 2018 to 2025. Element also owns and operates a distribution company, Volta.

In 2015 the company co-produced the television series Red Rock with TV3 as well as the feature film The Lobster.

Also, in 2015, Element Pictures received three Independent Spirit Award nominations and its co-production, Lenny Abrahamson's Room, was nominated for three Golden Globe awards. In 2019, they distributed the Irish film, The Dig.

In May 2022, a majority stake in Element Pictures was acquired by Fremantle.

In January 2024, Element Pictures co-production Poor Things won the Golden Globe awards for Best Motion Picture – Musical or Comedy and Best Actress – Motion Picture Musical or Comedy for Emma Stone.

== Productions ==
=== Film ===
- Magdalene Sisters (2002)
- Boy Eats Girl (2004)
- Adam and Paul (2004)
- Omagh (2004)
- Lassie (2005)
- The League of Gentlemen's Apocalypse (2005)
- Isolation (2005)
- The Wind That Shakes The Barley (2006)
- Garage (2007)
- Cracks (2009)
- Zonad (2009)
- Five Minutes of Heaven (2009)
- Little Matador (2010)
- Parked (2011)
- The Guard (2011)
- What Richard Did (2012)
- Rosie (2018)

==== Co-production ====
- Laws of Attraction (2003)
- The Honeymooners (2005)
- All Good Children (2010)
- Essential Killing (2010)
- This Must Be The Place (2011)
- Shadow Dancer (2012)
- Frank (2014)
- Glassland (2014)
- Room (2015)
- The Lobster (2015)
- Disobedience (2017)
- The Killing of a Sacred Deer (2017)
- The Favourite (2018)
- Herself (2020)
- The Nest (2020)
- The Souvenir Part II (2021)
- Poor Things (2023)
- Kinds of Kindness (2024)
- September Says (2024)
- On Becoming a Guinea Fowl (2024)
- Pillion (2025)
- Bugonia (2025)

=== Television ===
- Prosperity (2007)
- Bittersweet (2008)
- Little White Lie (2008)
- Redwater (2017)
- Normal People (2020)
- Conversations with Friends (2022)
- The Dry (2022)
- The Listeners (2024)

==== Co-production ====
- Oceans Apart (2005)
- Return to the River (2006)
- Rough Diamond (2006)
- Mist Over Kilrush House (2007)
- The Old Curiosity Shop (2007)
- Murphy's Law (2007)
- The Invisibles (2008)
- Rock Rivals (2008)
- Baker Street Irregulars (2007)
- Inspector George Gently (2009)
- Pure Mule: The Last Weekend (2009)
- A Heart's Desire (2009)
- The Take (2009)
- The Silence (2010)
- Single-Handed (2010)
- Moonfleet (2013)
- Dark Touch (2013)
- Red Rock (2015)
