= Daisy Johnson (writer) =

British novelist and short story writer (born 31 October 1990)

- Born: 1990 (age 35–36); Paignton, England
- Education: Lancaster University, Somerville College, Oxford
- Occupation: Writer
- Writing career
- Language: English
- Genres: Novels, short stories
- Notable work: Everything Under (2018)

Daisy Johnson (born 31 October 1990) is a British novelist and short story writer. Her debut novel, Everything Under, was shortlisted for the 2018 Man Booker Prize, and beside Eleanor Catton she is the youngest nominee in the prize's history. For her short stories, she has won three awards since 2014.

== Biography ==
Johnson was born in Paignton, Devon, in 1990, and grew up around Saffron Walden, Essex. She was a pupil at a Quaker school, Friends' School, Saffron Walden, completing her A-levels in 2009. She earned her bachelor's degree in English and Creative Writing from Lancaster University before earning a master's degree in Creative Writing at Somerville College, Oxford, where she also worked at Blackwell's bookshop. While at Oxford, she won the 2014 AM Heath Prize for fiction while working on her first short story collection, and had short stories published in The Warwick Review and the Boston Review. Shortly after, she won the 2016 Harper's Bazaar short story prize for "What The House Remembers".

In 2015, she won a two-book deal with publisher Jonathan Cape for a collection of short stories and a novel. The short story collection titled Fen was published in 2017. Set in the fens of England, it draws upon the memories of the area where Johnson grew up. It comprises a set of linked short stories, focusing on the experiences of women and girls in a small town. Johnson describes the collection as liminal and mythic. The collection won the 2017 Edge Hill Short Story Prize.

Johnson followed Fen with her debut novel, Everything Under, in 2018. The novel focuses on the relationship between Gretel, a lexicographer, and her mother and is set against a backdrop of the British countryside. Gretel grows up on a canal boat with her mother and they invent a language to use between them. Gretel's mother abandons her when Gretel is sixteen, and the novel starts sixteen years later with a phone call. Johnson worked on the novel for around four years, starting it at the same time as her short story collection to challenge herself to write something longer. She went through at least five drafts of the book (which she has said had seeds in her studies of the Greek myth of king Oedipus), made several changes to characters and setting, and for a period, it was titled Eggtooth.

Everything Under was shortlisted for the 2018 Man Booker Prize. Johnson is the youngest author to be shortlisted for the prize.

Johnson currently lives in Oxford. Her favourite writers include Stephen King, Evie Wyld, Helen Oyeyemi and John Burnside. Her favourite poets include Robin Robertson and Sharon Olds. Had she been unsuccessful as a writer, Johnson suggests that she would have been a shepherd.

== Awards ==
- 2014: AM Heath Prize for fiction, winner
- 2016: Harper's Bazaar short story prize, winner ("What the House Remembers")
- 2017: Sunday Times Short Story Award, longlist ("Blood Rites")
- 2017: Edge Hill Short Story Prize, winner (Fen)
- 2018: Man Booker Prize shortlist (Everything Under)
- 2019: Desmond Elliott Prize longlist (Everything Under)

== Works ==
=== Novels ===
- Everything Under (2018), London: Jonathan Cape
- Sisters (2020)

=== Short story collections ===
- Fen: Stories (2017), UK: Jonathan Cape; USA: Graywolf Press
- The Hotel (2024), London: Vintage Publishing
