= IFTA Award for Best International Actor =

Irish film industry award

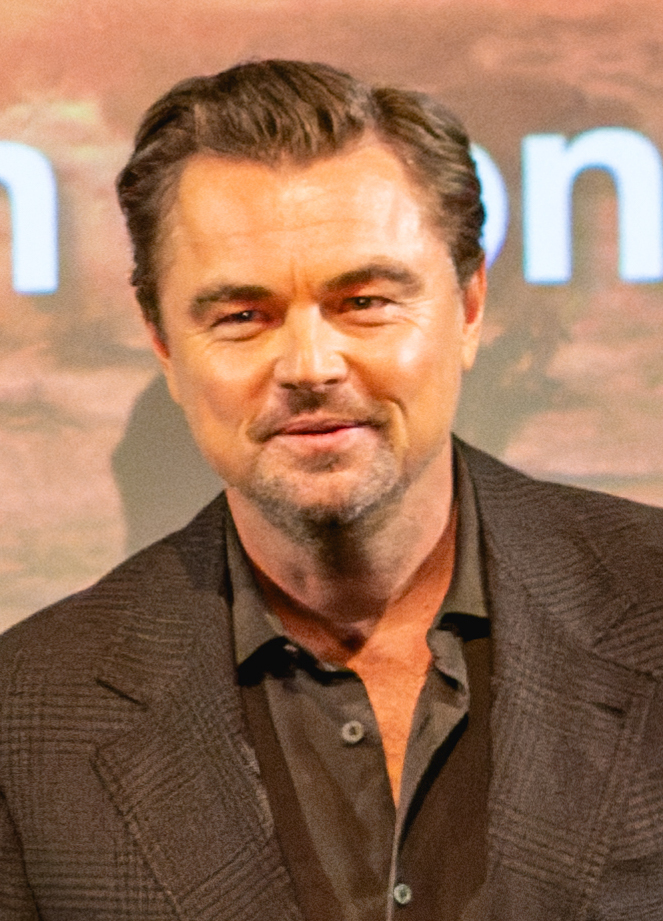
- The 2025 recipient: Leonardo DiCaprio
- Awarded for: Best Performance by an Actor
- Country: Ireland
- Presented by: Irish Film & Television Academy (IFTA)
- First award: 2004
- Most recent winner: Leonardo DiCaprio, One Battle After Another (2025)
- Website: ifta.ie

The IFTA Award for Best International Actor is an award presented annually by the Irish Film & Television Academy (IFTA). It was first presented at the 2nd Irish Film & Television Awards ceremony in 2004 to a non-Irish actor who has delivered an outstanding performance in a feature film.

The record for most wins is three, held by Leonardo DiCaprio, who also has the most nominations with seven. DiCaprio is the award's most recent winner, for One Battle After Another (2025).

== Winners and nominees ==
In the following table, the years are listed as the year of film. The first three ceremonies were held at the end of the year, but since the 4th Irish Film & Television Awards the ceremonies have generally been held the following year. The award wasn't presented between the 16th and the 18th ceremonies, returning at the 19th ceremony in 2023.

Table key
‡	Indicates the winner

=== 2000s ===
Year	Actor	Film	Ref.
2004 (2nd)	Johnny Depp ‡	Pirates of the Caribbean: The Curse of the Black Pearl	
2004 (2nd)	Jake Gyllenhaal	The Day After Tomorrow	
2004 (2nd)	Jude Law	Cold Mountain	
2004 (2nd)	Bill Murray	Lost in Translation	
2004 (2nd)	Sean Penn	Mystic River	
2005 (3rd)	Mickey Rourke ‡	Sin City	
2005 (3rd)	Christian Bale	Batman Begins	
2005 (3rd)	Johnny Depp	Charlie and the Chocolate Factory	
2005 (3rd)	Brad Pitt	Mr. & Mrs. Smith	
2006 (4th)	Leonardo DiCaprio ‡	The Departed	
2006 (4th)	Sacha Baron Cohen	Borat	
2006 (4th)	Daniel Craig	Casino Royale	
2006 (4th)	Ian McKellen	X-Men: The Last Stand	
2007 (5th)	Daniel Day-Lewis ‡	There Will Be Blood	
2007 (5th)	George Clooney	Michael Clayton	
2007 (5th)	James McAvoy	Atonement	
2007 (5th)	Ulrich Mühe	The Lives of Others	
2008 (6th)	Robert Downey Jr. ‡	Iron Man	
2008 (6th)	Casey Affleck	Gone Baby Gone	
2008 (6th)	Josh Brolin	W.	
2008 (6th)	Ralph Fiennes	The Duchess	
2009 (7th)	Robert Downey Jr. ‡	Sherlock Holmes	
2009 (7th)	Vincent Cassel	Mesrine: Killer Instinct	
2009 (7th)	Sam Rockwell	Moon	
2009 (7th)	Stanley Tucci	The Lovely Bones	

=== 2010s ===
Year	Actor	Film	Ref.
2010 (8th)	Jesse Eisenberg ‡	The Social Network	
2010 (8th)	Russell Crowe	The Next Three Days	
2010 (8th)	Leonardo DiCaprio	Inception	
2010 (8th)	Tahar Rahim	A Prophet	
2011 (9th)	Ryan Gosling ‡	Drive	
2011 (9th)	Don Cheadle	The Guard	
2011 (9th)	Leonardo DiCaprio	J. Edgar	
2011 (9th)	Gary Oldman	Tinker Tailor Soldier Spy	
2012 (10th)	Daniel Day-Lewis ‡	Lincoln	
2012 (10th)	Ben Affleck	Argo	
2012 (10th)	Bradley Cooper	Silver Linings Playbook	
2012 (10th)	Joaquin Phoenix	The Master	
2013 (11th)	Chiwetel Ejiofor ‡	12 Years a Slave	
2013 (11th)	Leonardo DiCaprio	The Wolf of Wall Street	
2013 (11th)	Michael Douglas	Behind the Candelabra	
2013 (11th)	Matthew McConaughey	Dallas Buyers Club	
2014 (12th)	Eddie Redmayne ‡	The Theory of Everything	
2014 (12th)	Steve Carell	Foxcatcher	
2014 (12th)	Benedict Cumberbatch	The Imitation Game	
2014 (12th)	Jake Gyllenhaal	Nightcrawler	
2015 (13th)	Leonardo DiCaprio ‡	The Revenant	
2015 (13th)	Matt Damon	The Martian	
2015 (13th)	Jacob Tremblay	Room	
2015 (13th)	Bryan Cranston	Trumbo	
2016 (14th)	Casey Affleck ‡	Manchester by the Sea	
2016 (14th)	Andrew Garfield	Hacksaw Ridge	
2016 (14th)	Ryan Gosling	La La Land	
2016 (14th)	Denzel Washington	Fences	
2017 (15th)	Ethan Hawke ‡	Maudie	
2017 (15th)	Timothée Chalamet	Call Me by Your Name	
2017 (15th)	Gary Oldman	Darkest Hour	
2017 (15th)	Sam Rockwell	Three Billboards Outside Ebbing, Missouri	

=== 2020s ===
Year	Actor	Film	Ref.
2022/23 (19th)	Austin Butler ‡	Elvis	
2022/23 (19th)	Tom Cruise	Top Gun: Maverick	
2022/23 (19th)	Cosmo Jarvis	It Is In Us All	
2022/23 (19th)	Felix Kammerer	All Quiet on the Western Front	
2022/23 (19th)	Josh O'Connor	Aisha	
2022/23 (19th)	Albrecht Schuch	All Quiet on the Western Front	
2023 (20th)	Paul Giamatti ‡	The Holdovers	
2023 (20th)	Bradley Cooper	Maestro	
2023 (20th)	Willem Dafoe	Poor Things	
2023 (20th)	Leonardo DiCaprio	Killers of the Flower Moon	
2023 (20th)	Ryan Gosling	Barbie	
2023 (20th)	Mark Ruffalo	Poor Things	
2024 (21st)	Ralph Fiennes ‡	Conclave	
2024 (21st)	Adrien Brody	The Brutalist	
2024 (21st)	Timothée Chalamet	A Complete Unknown	
2024 (21st)	Kieran Culkin	A Real Pain	
2024 (21st)	Sebastian Stan	The Apprentice	
2024 (21st)	Denzel Washington	Gladiator II	
2025 (22nd)	Leonardo DiCaprio ‡	One Battle After Another	
2025 (22nd)	Ethan Hawke	Blue Moon	
2025 (22nd)	Michael B. Jordan	Sinners	
2025 (22nd)	James McArdle	Four Mothers	
2025 (22nd)	Sean Penn	One Battle After Another	
2025 (22nd)	Jesse Plemons	Bugonia	

== Multiple awards and nominations ==
The following individuals have received two or more Best International Actor awards:

Wins	Actor	Nominations
3	Leonardo DiCaprio	7
2	Daniel Day-Lewis	2
2	Robert Downey Jr.	2

The following individuals have received two or more Best International Actor nominations:

Nominations	Actor
7	Leonardo DiCaprio
3	Ryan Gosling
2	Casey Affleck
2	Timothée Chalamet
2	Bradley Cooper
2	Daniel Day-Lewis
2	Johnny Depp
2	Robert Downey Jr.
2	Ralph Fiennes
2	Jake Gyllenhaal
2	Ethan Hawke
2	Gary Oldman
2	Sean Penn
2	Sam Rockwell
2	Denzel Washington
