= 19th Irish Film & Television Awards =

2023 Irish award ceremony

- Date: 7 May 2023
- Site: Dublin Royal Convention Centre
- Hosted by: Deirdre O'Kane

Highlights
- Best Film: The Banshees of Inisherin
- Best Direction: Frank Berry; Aisha
- Best Actor: Paul Mescal; Aftersun
- Best Actress: Bríd Ní Neachtain; Róise & Frank
- Most awards: Bad Sisters (4)
- Most nominations: Film: The Banshees of Inisherin (11); Television: Bad Sisters (12)

Television coverage
- Channel: RTÉ

The 19th Irish Film & Television Academy Awards, also called the IFTA Film & Drama Awards 2023 or the 20th Anniversary IFTA Awards, (Note: It was the 19th ceremony, but the 20th anniversary of the awards.) took place on 7 May 2023 and was hosted by Deirdre O'Kane in the new Dublin Royal Convention Centre, situated on Ship Street, close to Dublin Castle. It honoured Irish films and television drama released between 1 January 2022 and 11 March 2023. The nominations were announced on 6 March 2023.

Rising Star nominees were announced on 25 April 2023, ahead of the ceremony. RTÉ broadcast the ceremony and highlights from the IFTA Red Carpet; the awards ceremony and back stage were also distributed to over 120 news channels worldwide.

== Film ==
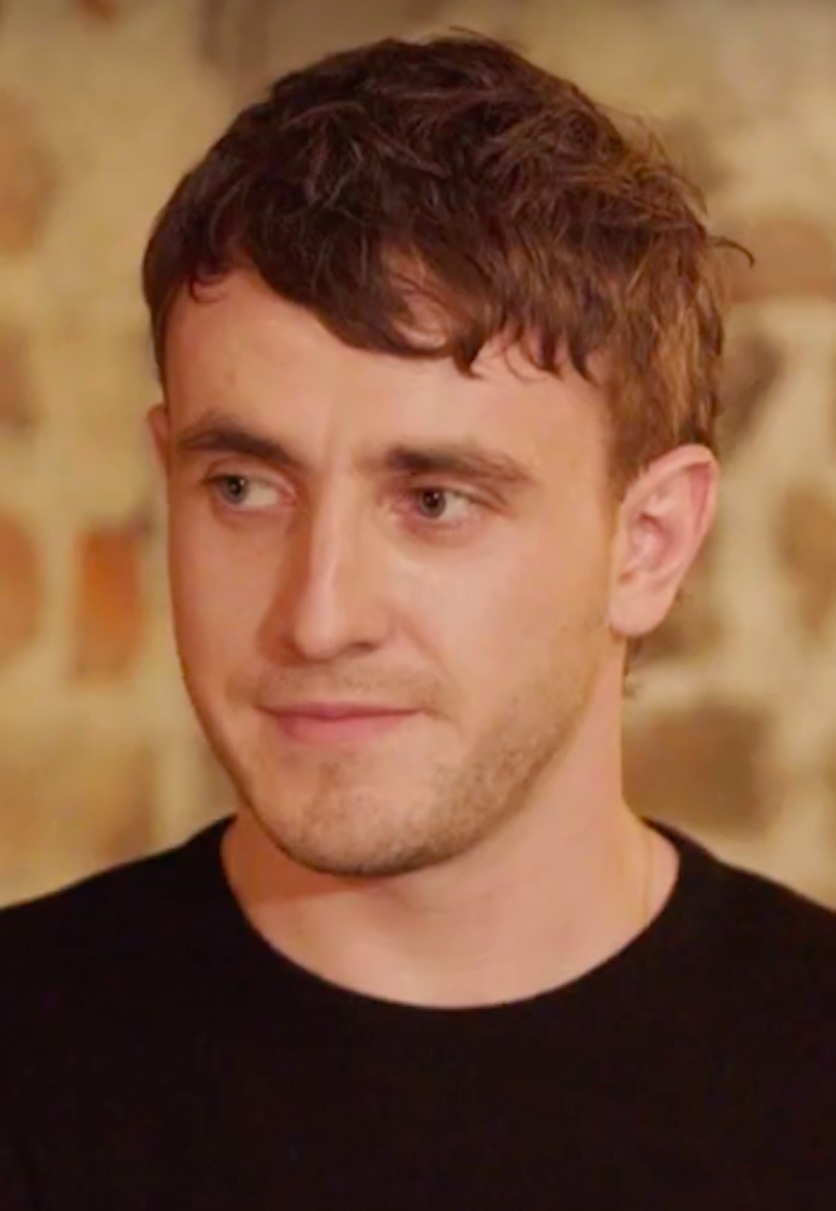
Paul Mescal, Best Actor in a Lead Role winner

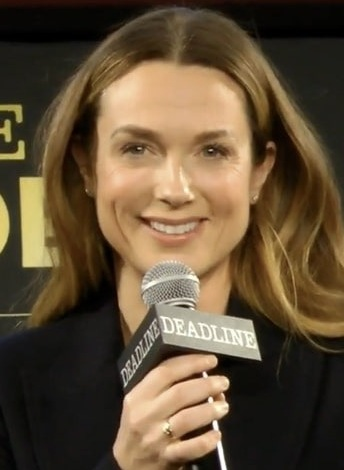
Kerry Condon, Best Actress in a Supporting Role winner

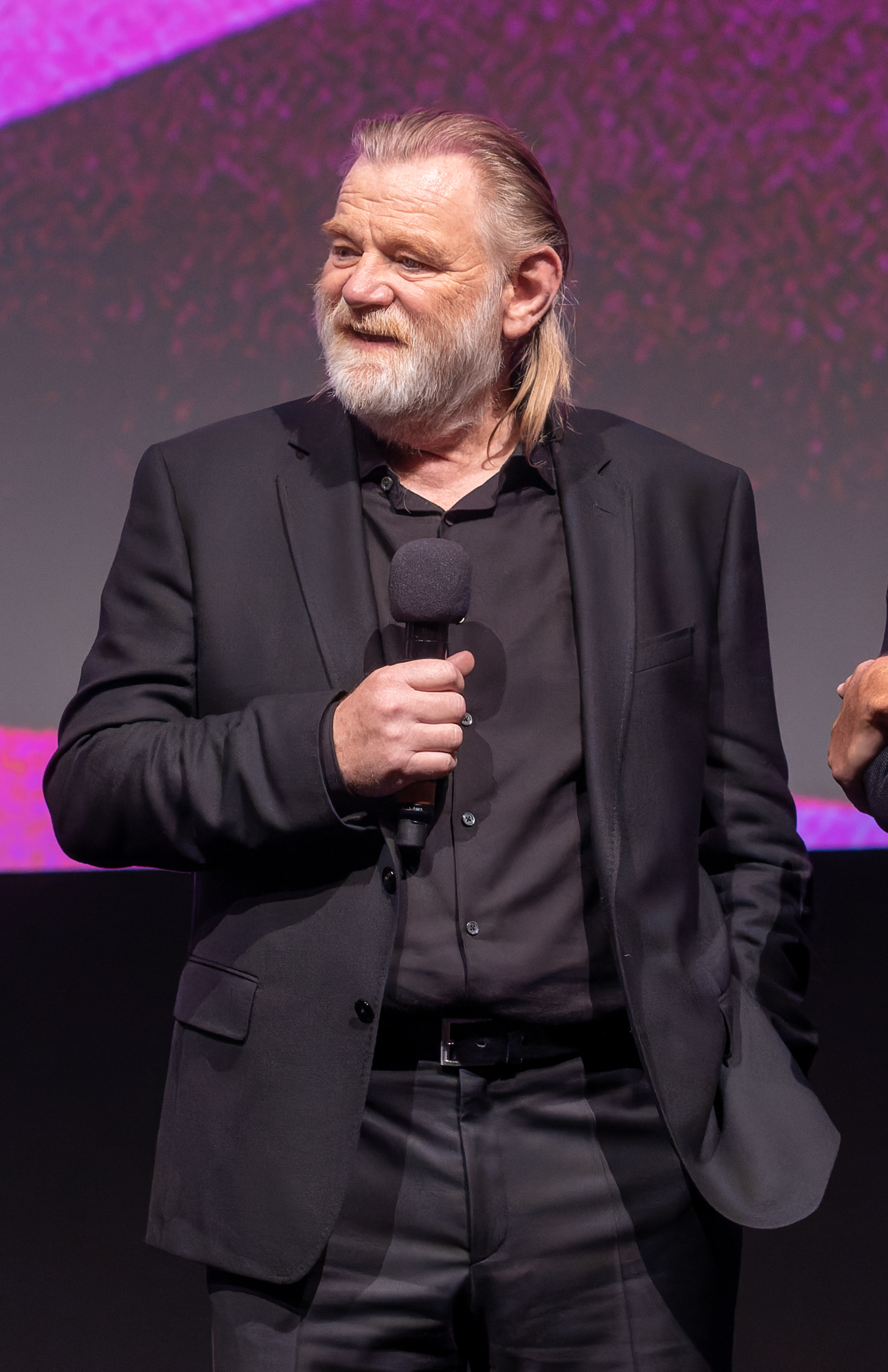
Brendan Gleeson, Best Actor in a Supporting Role winner

=== Best Film ===
- Aisha
- The Banshees of Inisherin (winner)
- God's Creatures
- Lakelands
- Róise & Frank
- The Wonder

=== Best Director ===
- Frank Berry – Aisha (winner)
- Antonia Campbell-Hughes – It Is In Us All
- Martin McDonagh – The Banshees of Inisherin
- Conor McMahon – Let the Wrong One In
- Rachael Moriarty and Peter Murphy – Róise & Frank
- Emer Reynolds – Joyride

=== Best Script ===
- Frank Berry – Aisha (winner)
- Shane Crowley – God's Creatures
- Ailbhe Keogan – Joyride
- Martin McDonagh – The Banshees of Inisherin
- Conor McMahon – Let the Wrong One In
- Rachael Moriarty and Peter Murphy – Róise & Frank

=== Best Actress in a Lead Role ===
- Zara Devlin – Ann
- Danielle Galligan – Lakelands
- Kelly Gough – Tarrac
- Seána Kerslake – Ballywalter
- Bríd Ní Neachtain – Róise & Frank (winner)
- Alisha Weir – Matilda the Musical

=== Best Actor in a Lead Role ===
- Colin Farrell – The Banshees of Inisherin
- Éanna Hardwicke – Lakelands
- Daryl McCormack – Good Luck to You, Leo Grande
- Paul Mescal – Aftersun (winner)
- Liam Neeson – Marlowe
- Ollie West – The Sparrow

=== Best Actress in a Supporting Role ===
- Jessie Buckley – Women Talking
- Elaine Cassidy – The Wonder
- Kíla Lord Cassidy – The Wonder
- Kerry Condon – The Banshees of Inisherin (winner)
- Aisling Franciosi – God's Creatures
- Eileen Walsh – Ann

=== Best Actor in a Supporting Role ===
- Pierce Brosnan – Black Adam
- Colin Farrell – The Batman
- Brendan Gleeson – The Banshees of Inisherin (winner)
- Barry Keoghan – The Banshees of Inisherin
- Paul Mescal – God's Creatures
- Andrew Scott – Catherine Called Birdy

=== Best George Morrison Feature Documentary ===
- The Artist & The Wall of Death
- The Ghost of Richard Harris
- How to Tell a Secret
- Million Dollar Pigeons
- North Circular
- Nothing Compares (winner)

=== Best Live Action Short ===
- Call Me Mommy
- Don't Go Where I Can't Find You
- An Irish Goodbye (winner)
- Lamb
- Wednesday's Child
- You're Not Home

=== Best Animated Short ===
- Candlelight
- Dagda's Harp
- Red Rabbit
- Soft Tissue (winner)

== Television ==
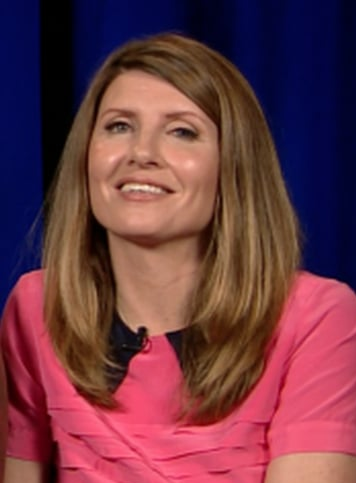
Sharon Horgan, Best Actress in a Lead Role winner

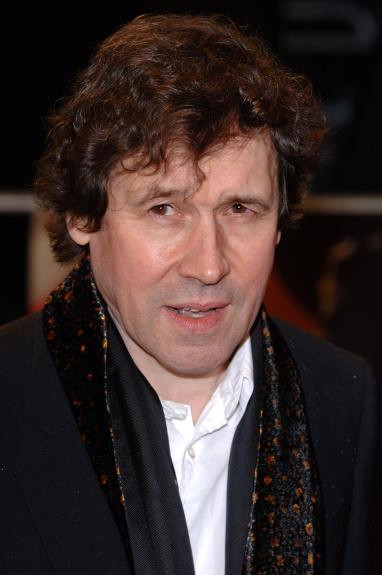
Stephen Rea, Best Actor in a Lead Role winner

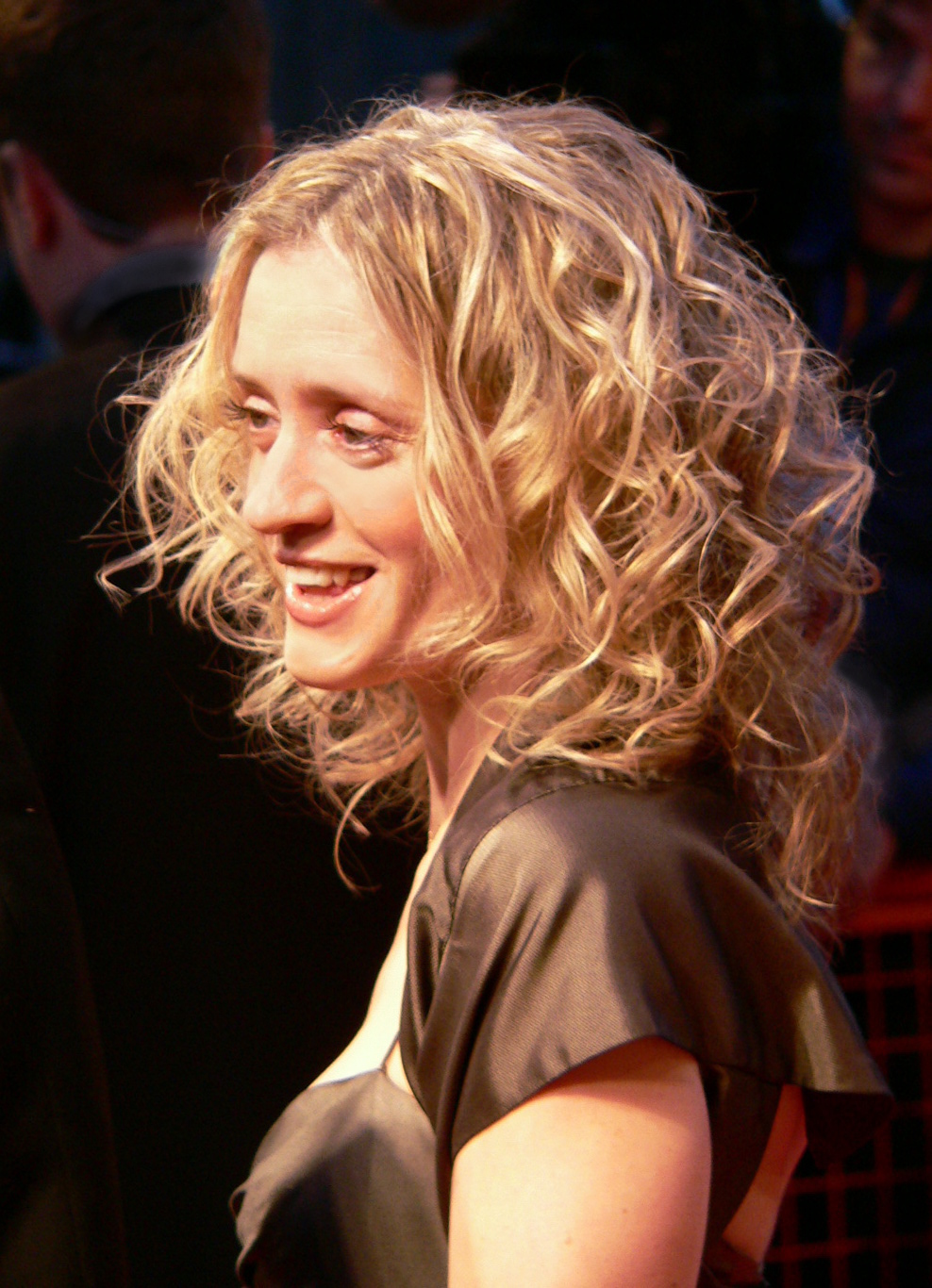
Anne-Marie Duff, Best Actress in a Supporting Role winner

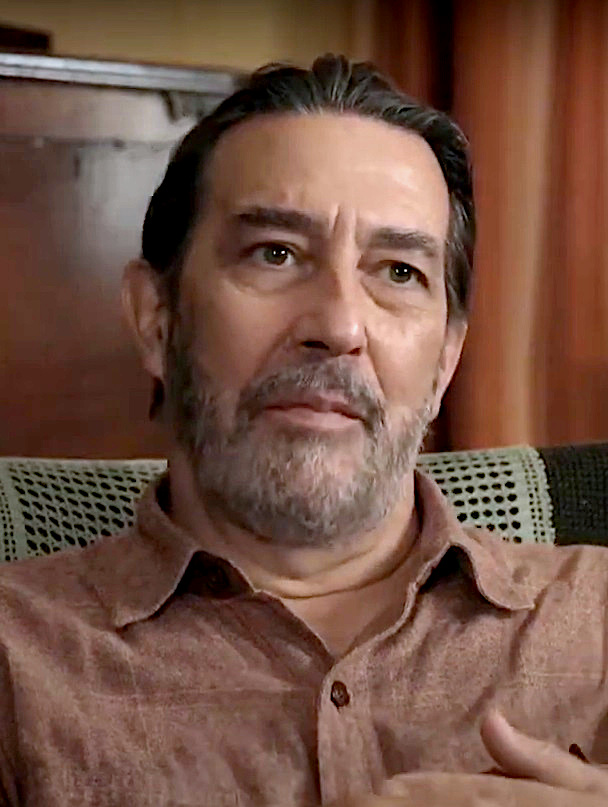
Ciarán Hinds, Best Actor in a Supporting Role winner

=== Best Drama ===
- Bad Sisters (winner)
- Conversations with Friends
- Derry Girls: The Agreement
- The Dry
- Smother
- Vikings: Valhalla

=== Best Director ===
- Lenny Abrahamson – Conversations with Friends
- Paddy Breathnach – The Dry
- Dathaí Keane – Smother
- Aoife McArdle – Severance
- Dearbhla Walsh – Bad Sisters (winner)
- Laura Way – Maxine

=== Best Script ===
- Ronan Bennett – Top Boy
- Nancy Harris – The Dry
- Sharon Horgan – Bad Sisters
- Lisa McGee – Derry Girls: The Agreement (winner)
- Mark O'Halloran – Conversations with Friends
- Kate O'Riordan – Smother

=== Best Actress in a Lead Role ===
- Caitríona Balfe – Outlander
- Roisin Gallagher – The Dry
- Sharon Horgan – Bad Sisters (winner)
- Dervla Kirwan – Smother
- Siobhán McSweeney – Holding
- Alison Oliver – Conversations with Friends

=== Best Actor in a Lead Role ===
- Conleth Hill – Holding
- Kerr Logan – North Sea Connection
- Vinnie McCabe – The Noble Call
- Jason O'Mara – Smother
- Stephen Rea – The English (winner)
- Aidan Turner – The Suspect

=== Best Actress in a Supporting Role ===
- Eva Birthistle – Bad Sisters
- Anne-Marie Duff – Bad Sisters (winner)
- Brenda Fricker – Holding
- Sarah Greene – Bad Sisters
- Eve Hewson – Bad Sisters
- Genevieve O'Reilly – Andor

=== Best Actor in a Supporting Role ===
- Moe Dunford – The Dry
- Brian Gleeson – Bad Sisters
- Ciarán Hinds – The Dry (winner)
- Daryl McCormack – Bad Sisters
- Michael Smiley – Bad Sisters
- Tommy Tiernan – Conversations with Friends

== Craft ==
=== Best Cinematography ===
- Eleanor Bowman – How to Tell a Secret
- Suzie Lavelle – Conversations with Friends
- Piers McGrail – It Is In Us All (winner)
- Peter Robertson – Vikings: Valhalla
- Cathal Watters – The Dry

=== Best Costume Design ===
- Joan Bergin – Disenchanted
- Consolata Boyle – Enola Holmes 2 (winner)
- Eimer Ní Mhaoldomhnaigh – The Banshees of Inisherin
- Susan O'Connor Cave – Vikings: Valhalla
- Kathy Strachan – Aisha

=== Best Editing ===
- Colin Campbell – Aisha
- Tony Cranstoun – Nocebo
- Mick Mahon – Nothing Compares
- Úna Ní Dhonghaíle – Death on the Nile
- Jonathan Redmond and Matt Villa – Elvis (winner)

=== Best Hair & Make-Up ===
- Dumebi Anozie and Liz Byrne – Aisha
- Eileen Buggy and Sharon Doyle – Mr. Malcolm's List
- Orla Carroll, Lynn Johnston, and Dan Martin – The Banshees of Inisherin
- Morna Ferguson and Lorri Ann King – The Wonder
- Tom McInerney and Joe Whelan – Vikings: Valhalla (winner)

=== Best Original Score ===
- Irene Buckley and Linda Buckley – Nothing Compares
- Daithí – Lakelands
- Sarah Lynch – The Dry (winner)
- Colm Mac Con Iomaire – Róise & Frank
- Stephen Rennicks – Good Luck to You, Leo Grande

=== Best Production Design ===
- Ray Ball – Mr. Malcolm's List
- Tamara Conboy – Aisha (winner)
- Tom Conroy – Vikings: Valhalla
- Mark Geraghty – Bad Sisters
- Padraig O'Neill – Róise & Frank

=== Best Sound ===
- Ben Baird and Hugh Fox – The Wonder
- Niall Brady, Steve Fanagan, and Derek Hehir – Conversations with Friends
- Chris Burdon, Johnathan Rush, Joakim Sundström, and Simon Willis – The Banshees of Inisherin
- Adrian Conway, Aza Hand, and Alan Scully – The Sparrow (winner)
- Hugh Fox, Michelle McCormack, and Brendan Rehill – Aisha

=== Best VFX ===
- Ed Bruce and Jim O'Hagan – Marlowe
- Ed Bruce and Jim O'Hagan – Stranger Things
- Paul Byrne and Simon Hughes – The Banshees of Inisherin
- Donal Nolan – The Woman King (winner)

== International ==
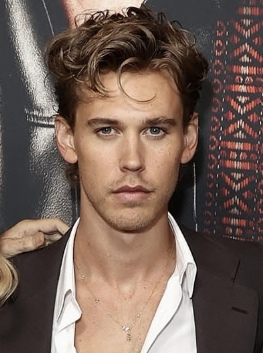
Austin Butler, Best International Actor winner

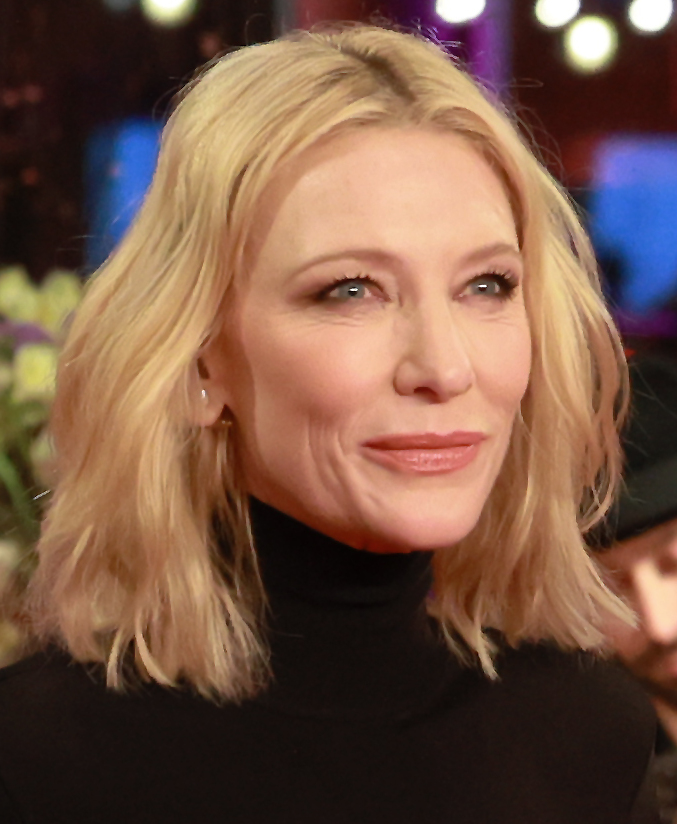
Cate Blanchett, Best International Actress winner

=== Best International Film ===
- Aftersun
- All Quiet on the Western Front (winner)
- Elvis
- The Fabelmans
- Tár
- Top Gun: Maverick

=== Best International Actor ===
- Austin Butler – Elvis (winner)
- Tom Cruise – Top Gun: Maverick
- Cosmo Jarvis – It Is In Us All
- Felix Kammerer – All Quiet on the Western Front
- Josh O'Connor – Aisha
- Albrecht Schuch – All Quiet on the Western Front

=== Best International Actress ===
- Cate Blanchett – Tár (winner)
- Viola Davis – The Woman King
- Florence Pugh – The Wonder
- Emily Watson – God's Creatures
- Michelle Williams – The Fabelmans
- Letitia Wright – Aisha

== Special ==
=== Screen Ireland Rising Star Award ===
- Aoife McArdle (Director/Writer — Brave New World, Kissing Candice, Severance)
  - Éanna Hardwicke (Actor — Lakelands, Normal People, The Sixth Commandment, Smother, The Sparrow)
  - Kathryn Ferguson (Documentarian — Nothing Compares, Taking the Waters)
  - Danielle Galligan (Actor — Every Five Miles, Kin, Lakelands, Shadow and Bone, Who We Love)
  - Daryl McCormack (Actor — Bad Sisters; Good Luck to You, Leo Grande; Peaky Blinders; Pixie)

=== The Irish Academy's Industry Lifetime Achievement Award ===
- Costume designer Joan Bergin (for her outstanding contribution to the Irish and international screen industry, across both film and television)

== See also ==
- 2022 in Irish television
- 2023 in Irish television
- 76th British Academy Film Awards
- 2023 British Academy Television Awards
