= 15th Irish Film & Television Awards =

Annual Irish media awards ceremony

15th IFTA Film & Drama Awards
- Date: 15 February 2018
- Site: Mansion House, Dublin
- Hosted by: Deirdre O'Kane

Highlights
- Best Film: Michael Inside
- Best Direction: Aisling Walsh; Maudie
- Best Actor: John Connors; Cardboard Gangsters
- Best Actress: Saoirse Ronan; Lady Bird
- Most awards: Three Billboards Outside Ebbing, Missouri and Maudie (3 each)
- Most nominations: Three Billboards Outside Ebbing, Missouri; Maudie; and Vikings (6 each)

Television coverage
- Channel: RTÉ

The 15th Irish Film & Television Academy Awards took place at the Mansion House on 15 February 2018 in Dublin, honouring Irish film and television drama released in 2017. Deirdre O'Kane hosted the film awards ceremony. Rising Star Award nominees were announced the day before the ceremony, on 14 February.

The Irish Film and Television Academy announced the nomination for the IFTA Film & Drama Awards. Winners are denoted by bold letters.

== Film ==
=== Feature film ===
Michael Inside

- Cardboard Gangsters
- Handsome Devil
- The Killing of a Sacred Deer
- Maudie
- Song of Granite

=== Director ===
Aisling Walsh – Maudie

- Frank Berry – Michael Inside
- John Butler – Handsome Devil
- Martin McDonagh – Three Billboards Outside Ebbing, Missouri
- Mark O Connor – Cardboard Gangsters

=== Scriptwriter ===
Martin McDonagh – Three Billboards Outside Ebbing, Missouri

- Frank Berry – Michael Inside
- Stephen Burke – Maze
- John Butler – Handsome Devil
- Nick Kelly – The Drummer and The Keeper

=== Actor in a leading role ===
John Connors – Cardboard Gangsters

- Colin Farrell – The Killing of a Sacred Deer
- Dafhyd Flynn – Michael Inside
- Fionn O'Shea – Handsome Devil
- Tom Vaughan-Lawlor – Maze

=== Actress in a leading role ===
Saoirse Ronan – Lady Bird

- Sarah Bolger – Halal Daddy
- Ann Skelly – Kissing Candice

=== Actor in a supporting role ===
Barry Keoghan – The Killing of a Sacred Deer

- Jacob McCarthy – The Drummer and The Keeper
- Andrew Scott – Handsome Devil
- Fionn Walton – Cardboard Gangsters
- Barry Ward – Maze

=== Actress in a supporting role ===
Victoria Smurfit – The Lears

- Niamh Algar – The Drummer and The Keeper
- Sarah Carroll – The Limit Of
- Deirdre O Kane – Halal Daddy
- Fionna Hewitt Twamley – Cardboard Gangsters

=== George Morrison Feature Documentary ===
The Farthest

- The 34th
- A Cambodian Spring
- No Stone Unturned
- The Silver Branch

=== Short film – Live action ===
Wave

- Cry Rosa
- For You
- Lily
- The Secret Market
- The Tattoo
- Time Traveller

=== Animated short film ===
Late Afternoon

- An Beal Bocht
- Angela's Christmas
- Departure

== Craft ==
=== Original music ===
Stephen McKeon – Pilgrimage

- Ray Harman – The Farthest
- Stephen Rennicks – Maze
- John Gerard Walsh – The Drummer and The Keeper

=== Editing ===
Una Ni DhonghaIle – Three Girls

- Tony Cranstoun – The Farthest
- Dermot Diskin – Peaky Blinders
- Tadhg O Sullivan – Song of Granite

=== Production Design ===
John Hand – Maudie

- Stephen Daly – Into the Badlands
- Joe Fallover – The Lodgers
- Mark Geraghty – Vikings

=== Cinematography ===
Seamus McGarvey – The Greatest Showman

- Tom Comerford – Pilgrimage
- Richard Kendrick – Song of Granite
- Cathal Watters – Peaky Blinders

=== Costume Design ===
Consolata Boyle – Victoria and Abdul

- Sarajane Ffrench O Carroll – The Lodgers
- Susan O Connor Cave – Vikings
- Leonie Prendergast – Pilgrimage

=== Make Up/Hair ===
Clare Lambe & Sevlene Roddy – Into the Badlands

- Julie-Ann Ryan & Niamh Glynn – The Cured
- Lorraine Glynn & Sonya Dolan – The Man Who Invented Christmas
- Dee Corcoran & Tom McInerney – Vikings

=== Sound ===
Steve Fanagan, Kieran Horgan – The Farthest

- Ronan Hill, Onnalee Blank, Mathew Waters – Game of Thrones
- Karl Merren, Brendan Deasy – Into the Badlands
- Marco Dolle, Steve Munro, Garret Farrel – Maudie

=== VFX ===
Tailored Films & Bowsie Workshop – The Lodgers

- Tim Chauncey – The Ash Lad: In the Hall of the Mountain King
- Ian Benjamin Kenny, Enda O Connor – The Farthest
- Ed Bruce & Nicholas Murphy, Screenscene – Game of Thrones

== International categories ==
=== International film ===
Three Billboards Outside Ebbing, Missouri

- Dunkirk
- Lady Bird
- The Shape of Water

=== International actor ===
Ethan Hawke – Maudie

- Timothée Chalamet – Call Me by Your Name
- Gary Oldman – Darkest Hour
- Sam Rockwell – Three Billboards Outside Ebbing, Missouri

=== International actress ===
Frances McDormand – Three Billboards Outside Ebbing, Missouri

- Sally Hawkins – Maudie
- Sally Hawkins – The Shape of Water
- Nicole Kidman – The Killing of a Sacred Deer

== Television drama ==
=== Drama ===
Game of Thrones

- Acceptable Risk
- Line of Duty
- Paula
- Striking Out
- Vikings

=== Director ===
Dearbhla Walsh – Fargo

- David Caffrey – Peaky Blinders
- Rob Quinn – Ackley Bridge
- Steve Saint Leger – Vikings

=== Scriptwriter ===
Conor McPherson – Paula

- Ronan Bennett – Gunpowder
- Malcolm Campbell – Ackley Bridge
- Antoine O Flatharta – Grace Harte

=== Actor in a leading role ===
Cillian Murphy – Peaky Blinders

- Richard Dormer – Rellik
- Adrian Dunbar – Line Of Duty
- Brendan Gleeson – Mr. Mercedes
- Chris O'Dowd – Get Shorty

=== Actress in a leading role ===
Caitriona Balfe – Outlander

- Elaine Cassidy – Acceptable Risk
- Denise Gough – Paula
- Amy Huberman – Striking Out
- Ruth Negga – Preacher

=== Actor in a supporting role ===
Liam Cunningham – Game of Thrones

- Moe Dunford – Vikings
- Aidan Gillen – Game of Thrones
- Owen McDonnell – Paula
- Jason O'Mara – Agents of S.H.I.E.L.D.

=== Actress in a supporting role ===
Charlie Murphy – Peaky Blinders

- Angeline Ball – Acceptable Risk
- Eva Birthistle – The Last Kingdom
- Jessie Buckley – Taboo
- Genevieve O’Reilly – Tin Star

== Special ==
=== Rising Star ===
- Jacob McCarthy (Actor — A.P. Bio, The Drummer & the Keeper, Pria)
  - Jessie Buckley (Actor — Beast, The Last Post, Taboo)
  - Dafhyd Flynn (Actor — Day Out, I Used to Live Here, Michael Inside)
  - Fionn O'Shea (Actor — The Aftermath, Handsome Devil, Hang Ups, The Siege of Jadotville)
  - Ann Skelly (Actor — Kissing Candice, Playground, Rebellion, Red Rock)
