= The Dig (2018 film) =

2018 film directed by Andy Tohill and Ryan Tohill

- Official theatrical poster
- Directed by: Andy Tohill; Ryan Tohill
- Written by: Stuart Drennan
- Produced by: Brian J. Falconer
- Starring: Moe Dunford; Lorcan Cranitch; Emily Taaffe; Francis Magee; Katherine Devlin
- Cinematography: Angus Mitchell
- Edited by: Helen Sheridan
- Music by: James Everett
- Production companies: Out of Orbit; Wolfhound Media
- Distributed by: Element Pictures (Ireland)
- Release dates: 21 April 2018 (Belfast Film Festival); 26 April 2019 (United Kingdom)
- Running time: 97 minutes
- Countries: Ireland; United Kingdom
- Language: English
- Box office: $23,839

The Dig is a 2018 Irish drama film directed by Andy Tohill and Ryan Tohill, from a screenplay by Stuart Drennan. The film was screened at the Toronto International Film Festival and was produced by Brian J. Falconer for Northern Irish firm Out of Orbit.

== Plot ==
A father, Sean McKenna (Cranitch), becomes obsessed with finding the body of his murdered daughter, Niamh. The murderer, Ronan Callahan (Dunford), is released from jail after serving a 15-year sentence. At first, he wants Sean off his land, but then decides to help dig for Niamh's missing body in the bog. Sean tells Ronan he must dig until he is dead, as a curse, but Ronan replies "I will", as a promise. He pours the old alcohol in his house down the drain, but - egged on by the aggressive police officer (Magee) who arrested him - eventually drinks shots in a pub, hoping to remember the act of murder and where he buried the girl. He develops a relationship with the victim's sister, Roberta (Taaffe). Ronan has flashbacks that revealed his father had abused his mother, who died when he was 14. Ronan and Sean vow not to stop digging. Ronan eventually remembers a detail that proves he is not the murderer.

== Cast ==
- Moe Dunford as Ronan Callahan
- Lorcan Cranitch as Sean McKenna
- Emily Taaffe as Roberta McKenna
- Francis Magee as Murphy
- Katherine Devlin as Siobhan

== Reception ==
=== Critical response ===
On the review aggregator website Rotten Tomatoes, 75% of 12 critics' reviews are positive, with an average rating of 6.8/10.

=== Accolades ===
Year	Award	Category	Recipients	Result	Ref.
2018	British Independent Film Awards	The Discovery Award	Brian J. Falconer, Andy Tohill, Ryan Tohill, Stuart Drennan	Nominated	
2018	Cork International Film Festival	Gradam Spiorad na Féile (Spirit of the Festival Award)	Andy Tohill & Ryan Tohill	Nominated	
2018	Galway Film Fleadh	Feature Film Award	—N/a	Won	
2019	Dublin Film Critics' Circle Awards	Best Irish Film	—N/a	7th place	
2019	Newport Beach Film Festival	Breakthrough Award - Breakthrough Artist	Moe Dunford	Won	
2019	Newport Beach Film Festival	Jury Award - Best Actor	Moe Dunford	Won	
2020	IFTA Film & Drama Awards	Best Film 2019	Brian J. Falconer	Nominated	
2020	IFTA Film & Drama Awards	Best Actor in a Lead Role - Film	Moe Dunford	Nominated	
2020	IFTA Film & Drama Awards	Best Actor in a Supporting Role - Film	Lorcan Cranitch	Nominated	
2020	IFTA Film & Drama Awards	Best Actress in a Supporting Role - Film	Emily Taaffe	Nominated	
