= Dublin Film Critics' Circle =

Irish film critic association

The Dublin Film Critics' Circle is an Irish film critic association. From 2006, every year, members of the association give out their annual awards.

== Winners ==
=== 2025 winners ===
- Best Film – Sinners
- Best Director – Ryan Coogler, Sinners
- Best Irish Film – Christy
- Best Documentary – Blue Road: The Edna O'Brien Story
- Best Actor – Michael B. Jordan, Sinners
- Best Actress – Emma Stone, Bugonia
- Best Screenplay – Ryan Coogler, Sinners
- Best Cinematography – Autumn Durald Arkapaw, Sinners
- International Breakthrough – Eva Victor, Sorry, Baby
- Irish Breakthrough – Brendan Canty, Christy

=== 2024 winners ===
- Best Film – The Zone of Interest
- Best Director – Jonathan Glazer, The Zone of Interest
- Best Irish Film – Kneecap
- Best Documentary – Will & Harper
- Best Actor – Ralph Fiennes, Conclave
- Best Actress – Mikey Madison, Anora
- Best Screenplay – Jonathan Glazer, The Zone of Interest
- Best Cinematography – Stéphane Fontaine, Conclave
- Breakthrough – Nykiya Adams, Bird

=== 2023 winners ===
- Best Film – Past Lives
- Best Director – Celine Song, Past Lives
- Best Irish Film – Lakelands
- Best Documentary – The Deepest Breath
- Best Actor – Cillian Murphy, Oppenheimer
- Best Actress – Lily Gladstone, Killers of the Flower Moon
- Best Screenplay – Justine Triet & Arthur Harari, Anatomy of a Fall
- Best Cinematography – Rodrigo Prieto, Killers of the Flower Moon
- International Breakthrough 2023 – Raine Allen-Miller, Rye Lane
- Breakthrough Artist (Irish) 2023 – Orén Kinlan, Flora and Son

=== 2022 winners ===
- Best Film – The Quiet Girl
- Best Director – Charlotte Wells, Aftersun
- Best Irish Film – The Quiet Girl
- Best Documentary – Moonage Daydream
- Best Actor – Colin Farrell, The Banshees of Inisherin
- Best Actress – Michelle Yeoh, Everything Everywhere All at Once
- Best Screenplay – Martin McDonagh, The Banshees of Inisherin
- Best Cinematography – Claudio Miranda, Top Gun: Maverick
- International Breakthrough 2022 – Amber Midthunder, Prey
- Breakthrough Artist (Irish) 2022 – Alisha Weir, Matilda the Musical

=== 2021 winners ===
- Best Film - The Power of the Dog
- Best Director - Jane Campion, The Power of the Dog
- Best Irish Film - Arracht
- Best Documentary - Summer of Soul (...Or, When the Revolution Could Not Be Televised)
- Best Actor - Benedict Cumberbatch, The Power of the Dog
- Best Actress - Frances McDormand, Nomadland & The Tragedy of Macbeth
- Best Screenplay - Jane Campion, The Power of the Dog
- Best Cinematography - Greig Fraser, Dune

=== 2020 winners ===
- Best Film - Portrait of a Lady on Fire
- Best Director - Bong Joon Ho, Parasite
- Best Irish Film - Wolfwalkers
- Best Documentary - David Attenborough: A Life on Our Planet
- Best Actor - Adam Sandler, Uncut Gems
- Best Actress - Jessie Buckley, I’m Thinking of Ending Things
- Best Screenplay - Simon Blackwell and Armando Iannucci, The Personal History of David Copperfield
- Best Cinematography - Roger Deakins, 1917
- Breakthrough Award - Morfydd Clark, The Personal History of David Copperfield and Saint Maud

=== 2019 winners ===
- Best Film - Marriage Story
- Best Director - Martin Scorsese, The Irishman
- Best Actor - Adam Driver, Marriage Story
- Best Actress - Scarlett Johansson, Marriage Story
- Best Screenplay - Noah Baumbach, Marriage Story
- Best Cinematography - Hoyte van Hoytema, Ad Astra
- Best Irish Film - Extra Ordinary
- Best Documentary - Apollo 11
- Breakthrough Performance 2019 - Aisling Franciosi, The Nightingale
- Breakthrough Director 2019 - Kantemir Balagov, Beanpole

=== 2018 winners ===
- Best Film – Custody
- Best Director - Chloé Zhao, The Rider
- Best Irish Director - Rebecca Daly, Good Favour
- Best Screenplay - Lynne Ramsay, You Were Never Really Here
- Best Cinematography - Monika Lenczewska, Under the Tree
- Best Actor - Charlie Plummer, Lean on Pete
- Best Actress - Charlotte Rampling, Hannah
- Best Documentary - So Help Me God
- Best Irish Film - The Lonely Battle of Thomas Reid
- Michael Dwyer Discovery Award - Coralie Fargeat, Revenge
- George Byrne Maverick Award - Stephen Rea – Black 47
- Extraordinary Achievement - Bill Morrison, Dawson City: Frozen Time
- Jury Prize - Warwick Thornton, Sweet Country
- Jury Prize - Kathleen Hepburn, Never Steady, Never Still
- Jury Prize - Jian Liu, Have a Nice Day
- Jury Prize - Ryan Killackey, Yasuni Man

=== 2017 winners ===
- Best Film – Aquarius
- Best Irish Film - Sanctuary
- Best Actress – Florence Pugh – Lady Macbeth
- Best Actor – Sherwan Haji – The Other Side of Hope
- Best Director – Lav Diaz – The Woman Who Left
- Best Cinematography – M. David Mullen – The Love Witch
- Best Screenplay – Kristina Grozeva and Petar Valchanov – Glory
- Best Irish Feature – Handsome Devil
- Best Irish Documentary – The Farthest
- Best Documentary – I Am Not Your Negro
- Jury Prize – Kristopher Avedisian – Donald Cried
- Jury Prize – Daouda Coulibaly – Wùlu
- Jury Prize – My Life as a Courgette
- Jury Prize – The Transfiguration
- George Byrne Maverick Award – Emer Reynolds
- Michael Dwyer Discovery Award – Blue Teapot cast – Sanctuary

=== 2016 winners ===
- Best Film – I, Daniel Blake
- Best Director – Denis Villeneuve – Arrival
- Best Irish Film – A Date for Mad Mary
- Best Documentary – Weiner / Mattress Men (TIE)
- Best Actor – Dave Johns – I, Daniel Blake
- Best Actress – Amy Adams – Arrival
- Best Screenplay – Eric Heisserer – Arrival
- Best Cinematography – Seamus McGarvey – Nocturnal Animals
- Breakthrough Award (Irish) – Seana Kerslake
- Breakthrough Award (International) – Hayley Squires

=== 2015 winners ===
- Best Film – Inside Out
- Best Irish Film – Brooklyn / The Queen of Ireland (TIE)
- Best Documentary – The Queen of Ireland
- Best Director – Alejandro G. Iñárritu – Birdman or (The Unexpected Virtue of Ignorance)
- Best Actor – Michael Fassbender – Steve Jobs
- Best Actress – Julianne Moore – Still Alice
- Breakthrough International – Daisy Ridley – Star Wars: The Force Awakens / Kitana Kiki Rodriguez and Mya Taylor – Tangerine (TIE)
- Breakthrough Irish – Jordanne Jones – I Used to Live Here

=== 2014 winners ===
- Best Film – Boyhood
- Best Irish Film – Frank
- Best Documentary – Finding Vivian Maier
- Best Director – Richard Linklater – Boyhood
- Best Actor – Jake Gyllenhaal – Nightcrawler
- Best Actress – Marion Cotillard – Two Days, One Night
- Breakthrough Award – Jack O'Connell – '71, Starred Up, and Unbroken

=== 2013 winners ===
- Best Film – Gravity
- Best Irish Film – Good Vibrations
- Best Screenplay – Before Midnight
- Best Documentary – The Act of Killing
- Best Cinematography – Emmanuel Lubezki – Gravity, and To the Wonder
- Best Director – Alfonso Cuarón – Gravity
- Best Actor – Bruce Dern – Nebraska
- Best Actress – Cate Blanchett – Blue Jasmine
- Breakthrough Award – Lake Bell and Joshua Oppenheimer

=== 2012 winners ===
- Best Film – The Artist
- Best Irish Film – What Richard Did
- Best Documentary – Marina Abramović: The Artist is Present
- Best Director – Michael Haneke – Amour
- Best Actor – Joaquin Phoenix – The Master
- Best Actress – Emmanuelle Riva – Amour
- Breakthrough Award – Gareth Evans – The Raid: Redemption

=== 2011 winners ===
- Best Film – Drive
- Best Irish Film – The Guard
- Best Foreign Language Film – A Separation
- Best Director – Nicolas Winding Refn – Drive
- Best Actor – Ryan Gosling – Drive
- Best Actress – Jessica Chastain – The Tree of Life
- Best Documentary – Senna
- Best Irish Documentary – Knuckle
- International Breakthrough Award – Jessica Chastain – The Help, Take Shelter, and The Tree of Life
- Irish Breakthrough Award – John Michael McDonagh – The Guard

=== 2010 winners ===
- Best Film – A Prophet
- Best Irish Film – His & Hers
- Best Documentary – His & Hers
- Best Director – Jacques Audiard – A Prophet
- Best Actor – Tahar Rahim – A Prophet
- Best Actress – Jennifer Lawrence – Winter's Bone
- Breakthrough Award – Jennifer Lawrence – Winter's Bone
- Irish Breakthrough Award – Ken Wardrop – His & Hers

=== Decade awards ===
- Best Film of the Decade – There Will Be Blood
- Best Irish Film of the Decade – Adam & Paul, and Hunger (TIE)

=== 2009 winners ===
- Best Film – Let the Right One In
- Best Irish Film – Waveriders
- Best Documentary – Anvil! The Story of Anvil
- Best Director – Kathryn Bigelow – The Hurt Locker
- Best Actor – Sean Penn – Milk
- Best Actress – Yolande Moreau – Séraphine
- Breakthrough Award – Neill Blomkamp – District 9
- Outstanding Achievement – Duncan Jones

=== 2008 winners ===
- Best Film – There Will Be Blood
- Best Irish Film – Hunger
- Best Director – Paul Thomas Anderson – There Will Be Blood
- Best Actor – Daniel Day-Lewis – There Will Be Blood
- Best Actress – Kristin Scott Thomas – I've Loved You So Long
- Breakthrough Award – Steve McQueen – Hunger

=== 2007 winners ===
- Best International Film – The Lives of Others
- Best Irish Film – Garage
- Best Director – David Fincher – Zodiac
- Best Actor – Ulrich Mühe – The Lives of Others
- Best Actress – Julie Christie – Away from Her
- Breakthrough Award – Saoirse Ronan – Atonement

=== 2006 winners ===
- Best Film – Brokeback Mountain
- Best Irish Film – The Wind That Shakes the Barley
- Best Director – Martin Scorsese – The Departed
- Best Actor – Leonardo DiCaprio – The Departed
- Best Actress – Penélope Cruz – Volver
- Best Supporting Actor – Jack Nicholson – The Departed
- Best Supporting Actress – Abigail Breslin – Little Miss Sunshine
- Breakthrough Award – Noah Baumbach – The Squid and the Whale
