= IFTA Award for Best International Film =

Irish film industry award

- Awarded for: Best International Film
- Country: Ireland
- Presented by: Irish Film & Television Academy (IFTA)
- First award: 2004
- Most recent winner: Hamnet (2025)
- Website: ifta.ie

The IFTA Award for Best International Film is an award presented annually by the Irish Film & Television Academy (IFTA). It was first awarded at the 2nd Irish Film & Television Awards ceremony in 2004, recognising an outstanding film produced outside of Ireland. Hamnet (2025) is the most recent winner of the award.

== Winners and nominees ==
In the following table, the years are listed as the year of film. The first three ceremonies were held at the end of the year, but since the 4th Irish Film & Television Awards the ceremonies have generally been held the following year. The award wasn't presented between the 16th and the 18th ceremonies, returning at the 19th ceremony in 2023.

Table key
‡	Indicates the winner

=== 2000s ===
Year	Film	Director	Ref.
2004 (2nd)	The Lord of the Rings: The Return of the King ‡	Peter Jackson	
2004 (2nd)	Fahrenheit 9/11	Michael Moore	
2004 (2nd)	Lost in Translation	Sofia Coppola	
2004 (2nd)	Mystic River	Clint Eastwood	
2004 (2nd)	The Passion of the Christ	Mel Gibson	
2005 (3rd)	Charlie and the Chocolate Factory ‡	Tim Burton	
2005 (3rd)	Batman Begins	Christopher Nolan	
2005 (3rd)	Crash	Paul Haggis	
2005 (3rd)	Sin City	Robert Rodriguez and Frank Miller	
2006 (4th)	Little Miss Sunshine ‡	Jonathan Dayton and Valerie Faris	
2006 (4th)	Babel	Alejandro González Iñárritu	
2006 (4th)	Casino Royale	Martin Campbell	
2006 (4th)	The Departed	Martin Scorsese	
2006 (4th)	United 93	Paul Greengrass	
2007 (5th)	The Lives of Others ‡	Florian Henckel von Donnersmarck	
2007 (5th)	Atonement	Joe Wright	
2007 (5th)	The Bourne Ultimatum	Paul Greengrass	
2007 (5th)	La Vie en Rose	Olivier Dahan	
2008 (6th)	In Bruges ‡	Martin McDonagh	
2008 (6th)	The Boy in the Striped Pyjamas	Mark Herman	
2008 (6th)	Man on Wire	James Marsh	
2008 (6th)	WALL-E	Andrew Stanton	
2009 (7th)	The Hurt Locker ‡	Kathryn Bigelow	
2009 (7th)	Avatar	James Cameron	
2009 (7th)	Let the Right One In	Tomas Alfredson	
2009 (7th)	Up	Pete Docter	

=== 2010s ===
Year	Film	Director	Ref.
2010 (8th)	The Social Network ‡	David Fincher	
2010 (8th)	Inception	Christopher Nolan	
2010 (8th)	A Prophet	Jacques Audiard	
2010 (8th)	Toy Story 3	Lee Unkrich	
2011 (9th)	Tinker Tailor Soldier Spy ‡	Tomas Alfredson	
2011 (9th)	Bridesmaids	Paul Feig	
2011 (9th)	Drive	Nicolas Winding Refn	
2011 (9th)	Senna	Asif Kapadia	
2012 (10th)	Argo ‡	Ben Affleck	
2012 (10th)	Amour	Michael Haneke	
2012 (10th)	Life of Pi	Ang Lee	
2012 (10th)	Lincoln	Steven Spielberg	
2013 (11th)	Philomena ‡	Stephen Frears	
2013 (11th)	12 Years a Slave	Steve McQueen	
2013 (11th)	Gravity	Alfonso Cuarón	
2013 (11th)	The Wolf of Wall Street	Martin Scorsese	
2014 (12th)	Boyhood ‡	Richard Linklater	
2014 (12th)	'71	Yann Demange	
2014 (12th)	The Imitation Game	Morten Tyldum	
2014 (12th)	The Theory of Everything	James Marsh	
2015 (13th)	Spotlight ‡	Tom McCarthy	
2015 (13th)	Ex Machina	Alex Garland	
2015 (13th)	Mad Max: Fury Road	George Miller	
2015 (13th)	The Revenant	Alejandro González Iñárritu	
2016 (14th)	Moonlight ‡	Barry Jenkins	
2016 (14th)	Hacksaw Ridge	Mel Gibson	
2016 (14th)	La La Land	Damien Chazelle	
2016 (14th)	Manchester by the Sea	Kenneth Lonergan	
2017 (15th)	Three Billboards Outside Ebbing, Missouri ‡	Martin McDonagh	
2017 (15th)	Dunkirk	Christopher Nolan	
2017 (15th)	Lady Bird	Greta Gerwig	
2017 (15th)	The Shape of Water	Guillermo Del Toro	

=== 2020s ===
Year	Film	Director	Ref.
2022/23 (19th)	All Quiet on the Western Front ‡	Edward Berger	
2022/23 (19th)	Aftersun	Charlotte Wells	
2022/23 (19th)	Elvis	Baz Luhrmann	
2022/23 (19th)	Tár	Todd Field	
2022/23 (19th)	The Fabelmans	Steven Spielberg	
2022/23 (19th)	Top Gun: Maverick	Joseph Kosinski	
2023 (20th)	Oppenheimer ‡	Christopher Nolan	
2023 (20th)	All of Us Strangers	Andrew Haigh	
2023 (20th)	The Holdovers	Alexander Payne	
2023 (20th)	Past Lives	Celine Song	
2023 (20th)	Poor Things	Yorgos Lanthimos	
2023 (20th)	Saltburn	Emerald Fennell	
2024 (21st)	Conclave ‡	Edward Berger	
2024 (21st)	Anora	Sean Baker	
2024 (21st)	The Brutalist	Brady Corbet	
2024 (21st)	Dune: Part Two	Denis Villeneuve	
2024 (21st)	The Outrun	Nora Fingscheidt	
2024 (21st)	The Substance	Coralie Fargeat	
2025 (22nd)	Hamnet ‡	Chloé Zhao	
2025 (22nd)	Bugonia	Yorgos Lanthimos	
2025 (22nd)	One Battle After Another	Paul Thomas Anderson	
2025 (22nd)	Palestine 36	Annemarie Jacir	
2025 (22nd)	Sentimental Value	Joachim Trier	
2025 (22nd)	Sinners	Ryan Coogler	
