= 12th Irish Film & Television Awards =

Annual Irish media awards ceremony

12th IFTA Film & Drama Awards
- Date: 24 May 2015
- Site: Mansion House, Dublin (Film Awards)
- Hosted by: Caroline Morahan (Film Awards)

Highlights
- Best Film: Song of the Sea
- Best Direction: Lenny Abrahamson; Frank
- Best Actor: Moe Dunford; Patrick's Day
- Best Actress: Deirdre O'Kane; Noble
- Most awards: Frank (3), Patrick's Day (3), Love/Hate (3)
- Most nominations: Frank (9), Patrick's Day (9)

Television coverage
- Channel: TV3 (highlights of the film awards 1 June)

The IFTA Film & Drama Awards took place at the Mansion House on 24 May 2015 in Dublin, honouring Irish film and television released in 2014.

Jim Sheridan received a Lifetime Achievement Award at the Awards Ceremony which was presented by Sean Bean. Caroline Morahan hosted the film awards ceremony on 24 May.

== Film Awards ==
The nominations for the IFTA Film & Drama Awards were announced on 29 April 2015.

Awards were presented in 27 categories.

=== Film categories ===
Film

- Frank
- Glassland
- I Used to Live Here
- Noble
- Patrick's Day
- Song of the Sea

Director in Film

- Frank - Lenny Abrahamson
- Glassland - Gerard Barrett
- Begin Again - John Carney
- Patrick's Day - Terry McMahon

Script Film

- Gerard Barrett - Glassland
- Frank Berry - I Used to Live Here
- Will Collins - Song of the Sea
- Terry McMahon - Patrick's Day

Actor in a Lead Role in a Feature Film

- Moe Dunford - Patrick's Day
- Colin Farrell - Miss Julie
- Michael Fassbender - Frank
- Jack Reynor - Glassland

Actress in a Lead Role in a Feature Film

- Tara Breathnach - A Nightingale Falling
- Jordanne Jones - I Used to Live Here
- Simone Kirby - Jimmy's Hall
- Deirdre O'Kane - Noble

Actor in a Supporting Role in a Feature Film

- Domhnall Gleeson - Frank
- Allen Leech - The Imitation Game
- James Nesbitt - Gold
- Andrew Scott - Pride

Actress in a Supporting Role in a Feature Film

- Kerry Condon - Gold
- Sinéad Cusack - Queen and Country
- Sarah Greene - Noble
- Catherine Walker - Patrick's Day

George Morrison Feature Documentary

- Blood Fruit - Ferndale Films
- In A House That Ceased To Be - Atlantic Film Alliance
- One Million Dubliners - Underground Films
- Road - DoubleBand Films
- Unbreakable - Ross Whitaker

Short Film

- Boogaloo and Graham - Michael Lennox / Ronan Blaney / Brian Falconer
- I Am Here - David Holmes
- Rockmount - David Tynan
- Skunky Dog - James Fitzgerald

Animation

- An Ode to Love - Matthew Darragh
- Fresh Cut Grass - Boulder Media
- Somewhere Down the Line - Julien Regnard
- The Ledge End of Phil (from accounting) - Paul Morris

=== International categories ===
International Film sponsored by American Airlines

- '71
- Boyhood
- The Imitation Game
- The Theory of Everything

International Actor

- Steve Carell - Foxcatcher
- Benedict Cumberbatch - The Imitation Game
- Jake Gyllenhaal - Nightcrawler
- Eddie Redmayne - The Theory of Everything

International Actress

- Patricia Arquette - Boyhood
- Toni Collette - Glassland
- Jessica Chastain - Miss Julie
- Julianne Moore - Still Alice

=== Television Drama categories ===
Best Drama – In Association with the BAI

- Charlie
- The Fall
- Game of Thrones
- Love/Hate
- Vikings

Director Drama

- David Caffrey - Love/Hate
- Ciaran Donnelly - Vikings
- Colm McCarthy - Peaky Blinders
- Dearbhla Walsh - Penny Dreadful

Script Drama

- Stuart Carolan - Love/Hate
- Tommy Collins, Eoin McNamee, Paul Walker - An Bronntanas
- Colin Murphy - The Guarantee
- Colin Teevan - Charlie

Actor in a Lead Role in Drama

- Jamie Dornan - The Fall
- Aidan Gillen - Charlie
- Cillian Murphy - Peaky Blinders
- Tom Vaughan-Lawlor - Love/Hate

Actress in a Lead Role Drama

- Caitriona Balfe - Outlander
- Michelle Beamish - An Bronntanas
- Maria Doyle Kennedy - Corp + Anam
- Charlie Murphy - Love/Hate

Actor in a Supporting Role in Drama

- John Connors - Love/Hate
- Liam Cunningham - Game of Thrones
- Stephen Rea - The Honourable Woman
- Andrew Scott - Sherlock: "His Last Vow"

Actress in a Supporting Role in Drama

- Charlotte Bradley - An Bronntanas
- Aisling Franciosi - The Fall
- Charlie Murphy - The Village
- Mary Murray - Love/Hate

== Craft/Technical categories (Film/TV Drama) ==
Costume Design

- Joan Bergin - Vikings
- Consolata Boyle - Miss Julie
- Lorna Marie Mugan - Peaky Blinders
- Eimer Ní Mhaoldomhnaigh - Jimmy's Hall

Production Design

- Tom Conroy - Vikings
- Mark Geraghty - Vikings
- John Paul Kelly - The Theory of Everything
- Donal Woods - Downton Abbey

Editing

- Úna Ní Dhonghaíle - The Missing
- Nathan Nugent - Frank
- Emer Reynolds - One Million Dubliners
- Emer Reynolds - Patrick's Day

Cinematography

- PJ Dillon - Vikings
- Michael Lavelle - Patrick's Day
- James Mather - Frank
- Piers McGrail - Glassland

Make-up & Hair Sponsored by M·A·C

- Jimi: All Is by My Side
- Frank
- Ripper Street
- Vikings

Original Score

- Ray Harman - Patrick's Day
- David Holmes - '71
- Stephen McKeon - Queen and Country
- Stephen Rennicks - Frank

Sound

- The Canal
- Frank
- Game of Thrones
- Patrick's Day

== Special awards ==
=== Irish Film Board Rising Star Award ===
- Sarah Greene (Actor — Burnt, Noble, Penny Dreadful)
  - Caitríona Balfe (Actor — Now You See Me, Outlander)
  - Moe Dunford (Actor — Crisis Eile, Patrick's Day, Vikings)
  - Dónal Foreman (Director/Editor/Writer — The Ghost Said, Out of Here)

=== Lifetime Achievement Award ===
- Jim Sheridan

== Television Awards ==
The nominations for the Television Awards were announced on 2 October 2015.
