= Metal Heart (disambiguation) =

Metal Heart is a 1985 album by Accept.

Metal Heart may also refer to:

- "Metal Heart", a song by Cat Power from Moon Pix
- "Metal Heart", a song by Garbage from Bleed Like Me
- "Metal Heart", a song by Sugababes from The Lost Tapes
- Metal Heart (film), a 2018 comedy film
