= Jordanne Jones =

Irish actress

- Born: 7 August 2000 (age 26); Tallaght, County Dublin, Ireland
- Education: Bow Street Academy; Trinity College Dublin
- Occupation: Actress
- Years active: 2014–present
- Notable work: Metal Heart; Resistance
- Mother: Lynn Ruane

Jordanne Jones (born 7 August 2000) is an Irish actress. Having begun as a child actress, she went on to appear in both television productions and in film, and she received a film critics' award.

== Early life ==
Jones is from Killinarden, Tallaght, South Dublin. She is the daughter of Senator Lynn Ruane, with whom she successfully campaigned to repeal the Eighth Amendment to the Constitution which had restricted abortion rights. Ruane was only 15 years old when she gave birth to Jones.

Jones attended Killinarden Community School. She went on to train at the Bow Street Young Filmmakers Academy and study English and Film at Trinity College Dublin.

== Career ==
Jones began her career as a child actress, earning a Dublin Film Critics' Circle Award as well as an IFTA nomination for her debut film role in Frank Berry's I Used to Live Here.

In 2016 and 2019, she played Minnie Mahon in the RTÉ One miniseries Rebellion and Resistance. Her lead performance in Metal Heart earned her the Bingham Ray award for Best Newcomer at the Galway Film Fleadh in 2018. She was named one of Screen International's 2019 Stars of Tomorrow.

She appeared in short films for spoken word artist and actor Emmet Kirwan, and musicians Dermot Kennedy and Lilla Vargen. She presented an award alongside actor Robert Sheehan.

== Personal life ==
Jones was diagnosed with Asperger syndrome when she was 17. She held an event for people on the autism spectrum at the Science Gallery Dublin, her place of work at the time, in 2019.

== Filmography ==
=== Film ===
Year	Title	Role	Notes
2014	I Used to Live Here	Amy	
2017	Heartbreak	Youngone	Short film
2017	My Father, My Blood	Daniel	Short film
2018	Metal Heart	Emma	
2018	Lady Black Eyes	Nora	Short film
2019	Moth	Roisin	Short film
2019	Sister This	Denise	Short film
2019	Young Mother	Nora	Short film
2021	You Are Not My Mother	Suzanne	
2021	Mildly Different	Christina (adult)	Short film

=== Television ===
Year	Title	Role	Notes
2016	Rebellion	Minnie Mahon	Miniseries
2019	Resistance	Minnie Mahon	Miniseries
2020	Dead Still	Lily Molloy	Miniseries; 3 episodes
2020	The Alienist	Kitty Byrnes	Episode: "Angel of Darkness: Better Angels"

=== Music videos ===
Song	Year	Artist	Notes
"All My Friends"	2020	Dermot Kennedy	

== Awards and nominations ==
Year	Award	Category	Work	Result	Ref
2015	Irish Film & Television Awards	Best Actress in a Lead Role – Film	I Used to Live Here	Nominated	
2015	Dublin Film Critics' Circle	Irish Breakthrough Artist	I Used to Live Here	Won	
2018	Galway Film Fleadh	New Talent Award	Metal Heart	Won	
