= Lorcan Cranitch =

Irish actor

- Born: Dublin, Ireland
- Occupation: Actor
- Years active: 1978–present

Lorcan Cranitch is an Irish actor. He became known for playing Jimmy Beck in the British series Cracker (1993-1995) and has had many roles in British television. More recently, he was seen in series 3 of the Northern Irish police drama series Blue Lights in November 2025.

== Early life and education ==
Born in Dublin, Lorcan Cranitch became involved in drama while a student. He attended secondary school at Terenure College.

In 1980 he moved to London, where he trained at Royal Academy of Dramatic Art.

== Career ==
Cranitch had a role on British television in a series eventually presented on Masterpiece Theater, Parnell and the Englishwoman, a 1991 BBC drama series, with his portrayal of Tim Healy being his first television role. He had a recurring role in the British series Cracker, and it was through his portrayal of the troubled DS Jimmy Beck (1993-1995) that he became a familiar face to viewers. He then played a recurring rile in the series Ballykissangel, which marked his return to the BBC, in the role of Sean Dillon, a part specially written for him.

In 2001 he starred in the short-lived drama series McCready and Daughter, taking on a role originally intended for his former Ballykissangel co-star, Tony Doyle, who died shortly before the series was due to be filmed. Cranitch appeared in the American series, Rome, in 2005, in the villainous role of the underworld baron Erastes Fulmen, an HBO/BBC production. He played Melvin in the series, New Tricks (episode, "Communal Living"), in 2008, and in the 2009 BBC drama, Best: His Mother's Son, he played Dickie Best, the father of footballer George Best. In 2011 he appeared as Liam Cullen in the episode "The Gift of Promise", in the series, Lewis. He appeared in the BBC series Death in Paradise, 2016, and in 2017 he played Assistant Chief Constable Nicholls in the first part of the final series of the BBC drama ,Inspector George Gently.

In February 2021, Cranitch took a lead role as Detective Chief Superintendent Jackie Twomey in the BBC crime drama series Bloodlands.

Cranitch has appeared in several other British television dramas, including briefly as DI Littlejohn in the Sky Atlantic series Fortitude, and as Deacon Brodie (with Billy Connolly), Shackleton (as Frank Wild) with Kenneth Branagh, Omagh, Hornblower (with Ioan Gruffudd), The Street, Waking the Dead, Spooks, Silent Witness, and New Tricks.

== Other work ==
=== Film ===
He has appeared in feature films, including Dancing at Lughnasa with Meryl Streep, as well as in The Playboys, and Titanic Town.

=== Stage ===
Cranitch has combined his on screen work with stage work, including with The Royal National Theatre, The Royal Shakespeare Company, Donmar West End, The Abbey and The Gate Theatre in Dublin.

== Personal life ==
Cranitch married Susan Jackson, a journalist and newsreader with RTÉ. They adopted an Ethiopian child in 2010, but separated in 2016.

== Filmography ==
=== Film ===
Year	Title	Role	Notes, Refs.
1987	The Magic Toyshop	Francie	
1987	Empire State	Richard	
1991	Chernobyl: The Final Warning	Chernov	Television film
1992	The Playboys	Ryan / John Joe	
1992	You, Me and Marley	Father Tom	Television film
1997	The Heart Surgeon	Larry Duggan	Television film
1997	Food of Love	Luke	
1998	Macbeth	Macduff	Television film
1998	Titanic Town	Tony	
1998	Night Train	Billy	
1998	Dancing at Lughnasa	Danny Bradley	
2000	McCready and Daughter	Michael McCready	Television film
2000	My Fragile Heart	Bernard Cleve	Television film
2003	Loyalty	Wolfe	Television film
2003	Duty	Wolfe	Television film
2004	Magic Circle	Clerk	Short film
2004	Omagh	Ronnie Flanagan	Television film
2004	The Queen of Sheba's Pearls	Harold Bradley	
2008	Summer of the Flying Saucer	Ciaran	
2008	God on Trial	Blockaltester	Television film
2009	Best: His Mother's Son	Dickie Best	Television film
2012	Come On	Groom	Short film
2012	Flying Blind	Duncan Morehouse	
2013	The Food Guide to Love	Eddie	
2014	Love, Rosie	Dennis Dunne	
2014	The Legend of Longwood	Lance Wicklow	
2015	The Bloody Irish	James Connolly	Television film
2016	My Life for Ireland	Pump Man	Short film
2017	Take Me Swimming	Interviewer	Short film
2018	The Dig	Sean McKenna	
2019	Dad	Dad	Television film
2020	Herself	Michael	
2020	Drifting	Diarmuid	Short film
2021	Ship of Souls	Michael	Short film
2021	Christmas at Castle Hart	Patrick O'Reilly	Television film
2022	Róise & Frank	Donncha	
2022	Aisha	Peter Flood	
2022	Tarrac	Bear	
2022	Lakelands	Diarmuid	
2022	Burn It All	Mr. Barrett	Short film
2022	LOLA	Major General Norbury	
2022	Stumbling	Logan	
2023	A Greyhound of a Girl	Make Judge	Voice only

=== Television ===
Year	Title	Role	Notes, Refs.
1978	The Spike	Fiona's Boyfriend	Episode: "The Curtin Equation"
1985	Bergerac	Police Sniper	Episode: "Avenge O Lord"
1987	ScreenPlay	Mr. Scott	Episode: "The Venus de Milo Instead"
1991	Parnell and the Englishwoman	Timothy Healy	Miniseries; 4 episodes
1993	The Bill	Laurence Connor	Episode: "If It Isn't Hurting"
1993–1995	Cracker	DS Jimmy Beck	Series regular; 19 episodes
1994	Family	Tutorial Teacher	Episode: "John Paul"
1995	Screen Two	Leo Doyle	Episode: "Life After Life"
1996	The Bill	Trevor Davis	Episode: "Repossession"
1997	Screen Two	George Smith	Episode: "Deacon Smith"
1998	Close Relations	Stephen	Miniseries; 5 episodes
1998–1999	Ballykissangel	Sean Dillon	Series regular; 24 episodes
2001	McCready and Daughter	Michael McCready	Series regular; 5 episodes
2001	Rebel Heart	Inspector Nelson	Miniseries; 2 episodes
2002	Shackleton	Frank Wild	Miniseries; 2 episodes
2002–2003	Spooks	Patrick McCann	Recurring role; 2 episodes
2003	Hornblower	Wolfe	Recurring role; 2 episodes
2005–2007	Rome	Erastes Fulmen	Recurring role; 6 episodes
2006	The Bill	DCI Frank Keane	Recurring role; 7 episodes
2007	Trouble in Paradise	Doc Little	Recurring role; 2 episodes
2007	The Last Detective	Patrick Cunningham	Episode: "The Dead Peasants Society"
2007	Rebus	Thomas Steele	Episode: "The First Stone"
2007	The Street	Danny Parr	Recurring role; 2 episodes
2008	The Palace	Jonty Roberts	Series regular; 8 episodes
2008	Waking the Dead	Victor Coleridge	Episode: "Wounds"
2008	New Tricks	Melvin	Episode: "Communal Living"
2009	The Clinic	Diarmuid	Recurring role; 3 episodes
2009	Paradox	Simon Manning	Miniseries; 5 episodes
2010	1916 Seachtar na Cásca	James Connolly	Miniseries; 7 episodes
2010	Law & Order: UK	Mike Jones	Episode: "Help"
2010	Single-Handed	Niall O'Sullivan	Episode: "A Cold Heaven"
2011	Silent Witness	DS Mansfield	Episode: "The Prodigal"
2011	Lewis	Liam Cullen	Episode: "The Gift of Promise"
2013	1916 Seachtar Dearmadta	James Connolly	Miniseries; 7 episodes
2013	Moonfleet	Meech	Miniseries; 3 episodes
2014	The Crimson Field	Aloysius McCafferty	Episode: "Episode 3"
2014	Penny Dreadful	Inspector Granworthy	Recurring role; 2 episodes
2014–2015	Atlantis	Cilix	Series regular; 7 episodes
2015	Fortitude	DI Littlejohn	Recurring role; 4 episodes
2015	Code of a Killer	DI Alan Madden	Miniseries; 2 episodes
2015	The Last Kingdom	Father Selbix	Recurring role; 2 episodes
2016	Death in Paradise	Tosh Walker	Episode: "The Blood Red Sea"
2016	Barbarians Rising	Avitus	Episode: "Ruin"
2017	Inspector George Gently	ACC Nicholls	Episode: "Gently Liberated"
2017	Acceptable Risk	James Nulty	Miniseries; 3 episodes
2019	Les Misérables	Chief Inspector	Recurring role; 2 episodes
2019	Vera	Roy Brewer	Episode: "Cuckoo"
2020	Rig 45	Adam	Series regular; 6 episodes
2021–2022	Bloodlands	Jackie Twomey	Series regular; 10 episodes
2022	Magpie Murders	Sir Magnus Pye / Max Ryeland	Recurring role; 4 episodes
2023	The Crown	Commissioner Stevens	Episode: "Hope Street"
2025	Trespasses	Police Sergeant Reid	
