= Handsome Devil (film) =

2016 film by John Butler

- Theatrical release poster
- Directed by: John Butler
- Written by: John Butler
- Produced by: Rebecca O'Flanagan; Robert Walpole; Claire McCaughley; Sarah Gunn
- Starring: Fionn O'Shea; Nicholas Galitzine; Andrew Scott
- Cinematography: Cathal Watters
- Edited by: John O'Connor
- Music by: John McPhillips
- Production company: Treasure Entertainment
- Distributed by: Icon Film Distribution
- Release dates: 11 September 2016 (TIFF); 21 April 2017 (Ireland)
- Running time: 95 minutes
- Country: Ireland
- Language: English
- Box office: $129,391

Handsome Devil is a 2016 Irish coming-of-age comedy-drama film written and directed by John Butler. It centres around Ned (Fionn O'Shea), an ostracised teenager at an elite, rugby-obsessed, all-boys boarding school in Ireland. Ned's unlikely friendship with his new roommate Conor (Nicholas Galitzine), the school's star rugby player, is tested by those around them. The film features themes of homosexuality, while examining hypocrisy and snobbery in the Irish private school system. It was shot on location in Castleknock College, and is based on Butler's own experiences attending Blackrock College in the 1980s.

Handsome Devil premiered in the Contemporary World Cinema section of the 2016 Toronto International Film Festival and was released in cinemas in Ireland on 21 April 2017 by Icon Film Distribution. The film received critical acclaim, winning the award for Best Irish Feature of 2017 from the Dublin Film Critics' Circle. It also earned four nominations at the 2018 Irish Film and Television Academy (IFTA) Awards, including Best Feature Film; and the Best Single Drama Award at the annual Celtic Media Festival in 2018.

== Plot ==
Ned is an ostracised student at the fictional Wood Hill College, an elite, rugby-obsessed, all-boys boarding school in Ireland. He seems to be the only student at the school who does not enjoy rugby. A new student arrives at the school, Conor, a star rugby player who is assigned to be Ned's roommate. Though initially wary of each other, they soon form a close friendship, with a shared interest in music. A new English teacher, Mr Sherry, also arrives at the school. Though stern, he is encouraging towards Ned and Conor. The school generally encourages homophobic behaviour, particularly by the students and the rugby coach, Pascal.

During a night out celebrating with the rugby team, Conor sees Mr Sherry with his male partner at a gay bar. At the same time, Ned realises that Conor is gay after seeing him enter the bar. Later that night, back at school, Pascal sees Mr Sherry and Conor talking and worries that Mr Sherry will have a negative effect on Conor. Pascal reports Mr Sherry to the headmaster.

At Mr Sherry's encouragement, Ned and Conor decide to perform a musical piece at the local primary school's talent show. Pascal encourages another student, Weasel, to ask his cousin (who attends the same school Conor did before starting at Wood Hill) why Conor got into fights at his previous school. Weasel reports that Conor fought with students who discovered he was gay. Pascal uses this knowledge as blackmail, insinuating that if Conor does not pick different friends, his secret will be revealed. As a result, Conor does not go to the scheduled performance with Ned. Ned turns up at an event with the rugby team to discover why, and Conor shoves him away in front of the entire team. Angry and frustrated, Ned outs Conor during a rugby rally. A remorseful Ned is suspended, and Conor runs away.

As the final match approaches, Conor is still missing. Ned knows where to find him and brings him back to the stadium, where they argue to Pascal and the team that Conor can still be gay and a good rugby player. The team stands by Conor, ultimately forcing Pascal to concede. The team eventually wins the final, while Mr Sherry comes out to the headmaster at the game. Ned returns to the school and wins the English writing competition using the story of his friendship with Conor in an essay titled "Handsome Devil".

== Cast ==
- Fionn O'Shea as Ned Roche
- Nicholas Galitzine as Conor Masters
- Andrew Scott as Dan Sherry
- Moe Dunford as Pascal O'Keeffe
- Michael McElhatton as Walter Curly
- Ruairi O'Connor as Weasel
- Ardal O'Hanlon as Donal Roche
- Amy Huberman as Natalie Roche

== Reception ==
=== Critical response ===
On the review aggregator website Rotten Tomatoes, the film holds an approval rating of 84% based on 49 reviews, with an average rating of 6.6/10. The website's critics consensus reads, "Handsome Devil offers a charming, well-acted variation on the coming-of-age story with a few fresh topical twists." Metacritic gives the film a weighted average rating of 60 out of 100, based on 6 critics, indicating "mixed or average" reviews.

=== Accolades ===
Award	Year	Category	Recipient(s)	Result	Ref.
Dublin Film Critics Circle Awards	2017	Best Irish Feature Film	Handsome Devil	3rd place	
Dublin International Film Festival	2017	Best Irish Feature	John Butler	Won	
FilmOut San Diego	2017	Best Actor	Fionn O'Shea	Won	
FilmOut San Diego	2017	Best Narrative Feature	John Butler	Won	
FilmOut San Diego	2017	Best Cinematography	Cathal Watters	Won	
Outflix Film Festival	2017	Best Foreign Feature	John Butler	Won	
Seattle International Film Festival	2017	Futurewave Youth Jury Award – Best Feature Film	John Butler	Nominated	
Celtic Media Festival	2018	Ireland Single Drama (Over 30 Minutes)	Handsome Devil	Won	
Irish Film and Television Awards	2018	Best Film	Rebecca O'Flanagan, Robert Walpole, Claire McCaughley and Sarah Gunn	Nominated	
Irish Film and Television Awards	2018	Best Director	John Butler	Nominated	
Irish Film and Television Awards	2018	Best Screenplay	John Butler	Nominated	
Irish Film and Television Awards	2018	Best Actor in a Leading Role – Film	Fionn O'Shea	Nominated	
Irish Film and Television Awards	2018	Rising Star Award	Fionn O'Shea	Nominated	
Irish Film and Television Awards	2018	Best Actor in a Supporting Role – Film	Andrew Scott	Nominated	
