= McCready and Daughter =

Television series

- Genre: Crime drama
- Written by: Ming Ho; Robert Jones; Andrew McCulloch; John Flanagan
- Directed by: Dermot Boyd; David Innes Edwards; A.J. Quinn
- Starring: Lorcan Cranitch; Patsy Palmer; Brendan Coyle; David Westhead; Kim Thomson
- Country of origin: United Kingdom
- Original language: English
- No. of seasons: 1
- No. of episodes: 6

Production
- Executive producers: Robert Bernstein; Kate Triggs
- Producer: Nick Pitt
- Running time: 60 minutes
- Production company: BBC Northern Ireland

Original release
- Network: BBC One
- Release: 15 June 2000 – 20 July 2001

McCready and Daughter is a British six-part television crime drama, broadcast on BBC One, from 15 June 2000 until 20 July 2001. The series starred Lorcan Cranitch and Patsy Palmer as Michael and Clare McCready, a father and daughter who are reunited through their work as private investigators within an Irish community in Kilburn, London, after Clare drops out of university and fails to find another job.

The part of Michael McCready was originally written for Tony Doyle, however Doyle died just days before filming was due to start. An initial pilot film was broadcast in 2000, before a series of five episodes followed in 2001. The series was originally written as a "star vehicle" for both Doyle and Palmer, paving the way for her return to television following her departure from EastEnders. The show's demise was blamed on poor viewing figures, and a lack of chemistry between the two main stars. The series has subsequently never been released on DVD.

== Cast ==
- Lorcan Cranitch as Michael McCready
- Patsy Palmer as Clare McCready
- Brendan Coyle as Donal McCready
- David Westhead as DCI Alan Kendall
- Kim Thomson as Laura Cooper

== Episodes ==
=== Pilot (2000) ===
| No. | Title | Directed by | Written by | British air date | UK viewers (million) |
|---|---|---|---|---|---|
| 1 | "McCready and Daughter" | AJ Quinn | Ming Ho & Robert Jones | 15 June 2000 | 7.62 |
Michael is hired to track down a bare knuckle fighter who has disappeared without trace. During the investigation, he is forced to deal with his wayward daughter Clare, who has dropped out of university and cannot find a job.

=== Series (2001) ===
| No. | Title | Directed by | Written by | British air date | UK viewers (million) |
|---|---|---|---|---|---|
| 1 | "Hobgoblin" | David Innes Edwards | Ted Gannon | 21 June 2001 | 5.66 |
Michael sends Clare undercover as a barmaid as the pair investigate the murder of a popular publican in a hit and run.
| 2 | "The Dating Game" | Piers Haggard | Robert Jones | 28 June 2001 | 5.03 |
Michael's attempts to find romance through a dating agency go horribly wrong, forcing Clare to prove her father's innocence after the woman he meets for a date is found murdered later that night.
| 3 | "Pasta La Vista" | Piers Haggard | John Flanagan & Andy McCulloch | 5 July 2001 | 4.63 |
Michael and Clare investigate the murder of a chef working at a local Italian restaurant, and uncover a complex web of secret relationships.
| 4 | "Obsessions" | David Innes Edwards | John Martin Johnson | 12 July 2001 | 5.04 |
Michael's past comes back to haunt him when the disappearance of a con man and the discovery of a young girl's body bears all the hallmarks to an unsolved murder he worked on twelve years ago.
| 5 | "No Bed of Roses" | Dermot Boyd | John Martin Johnson | 20 July 2001 | Under 5.14 |
The death of a woman who had campaigned against building development arouses the suspicions of Michael and Clare. Michael offers to help a young woman whose local neighbourhood has become infested with gangs and violence, but finds himself up against the woman's volatile sister.
