= Moe Dunford =

Irish actor (born 1987)

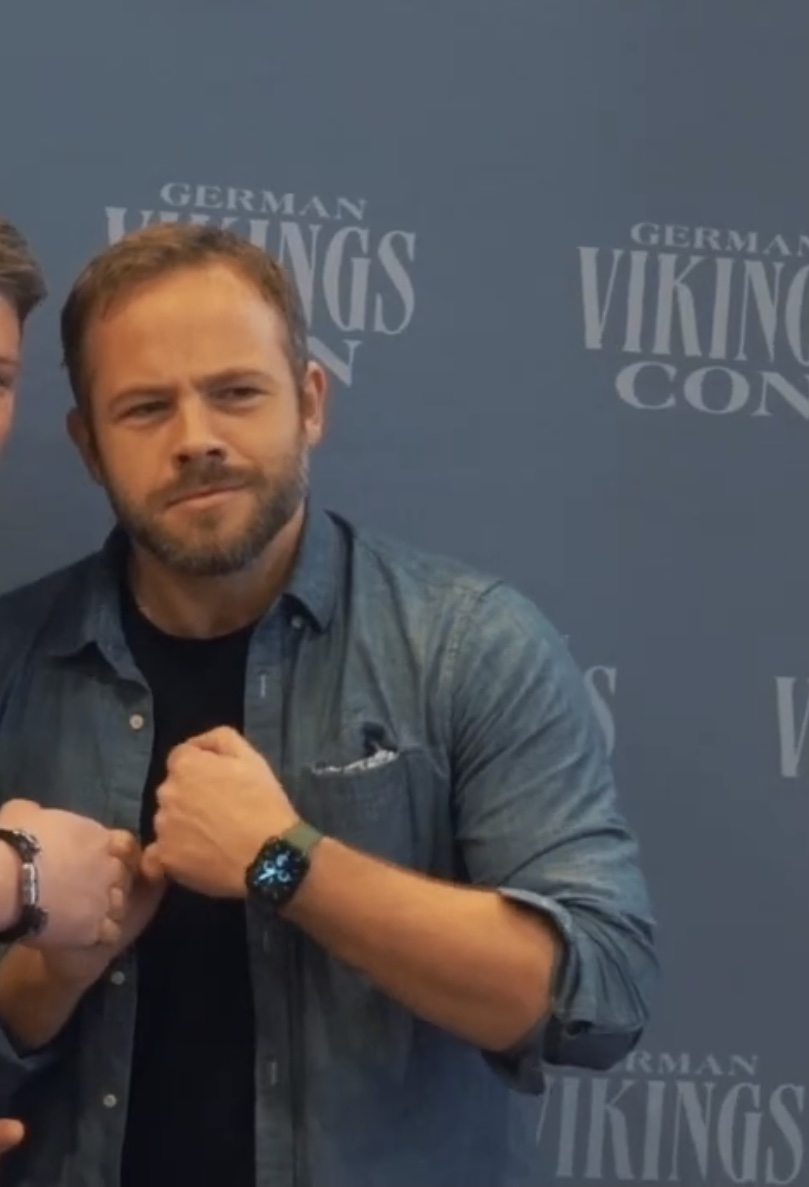
- Dunford at the 2022 German Vikings Con
- Born: Maurice Dunford; 11 December 1987 (age 38); Dungarvan, County Waterford, Ireland
- Occupation: Actor
- Years active: 2010–present

Maurice "Moe" Dunford (born 11 December 1987) is an Irish actor. He is best known for his roles as Aethelwulf in the television series Vikings (2014–2018) and Patrick Fitzgerald in the 2014 film Patrick's Day. He is the recipient of a number of accolades, including three Irish Film & Television Awards.

== Early life and education ==
Dunford was born in Dungarvan, County Waterford, Ireland. He graduated from the Gaiety School of Acting in June 2009.

== Career ==
Dunford started his acting career in 2010 on The Tudors. Afterwards he appeared in many films and television productions such as An Crisis and Game of Thrones. His most notable roles are Aethelwulf on the television series Vikings and Patrick Fitzgerald in the 2014 film Patrick's Day. In 2015, he received an IFTA in the category of Best Actor in a Lead Role in Film for Patrick's Day, and an EFP 2015 Shooting Stars Award representing Ireland at the Berlin Film Festival.

== Filmography ==
=== Film ===
Year	Title	Role	Notes
2014	Patrick's Day	Patrick Fitzgerald	
2016	The Flag	Mouse Morrisey	
2016	Handsome Devil	Pascal	
2017	Michael Inside	David	
2017	The Lodgers	Dessie	
2018	Black '47	Fitzgibbon	
2018	The Dig	Ronan Callahan	
2018	Metal Heart	Dan	
2018	Rosie	John Paul Brady	
2019	Dark Lies the Island	Martin Mannion	Adapted from a Kevin Barry story
2020	I Am Patrick: The Patron Saint of Ireland	Narrator	Voice role
2020	Angela's Christmas Wish	Father	Voice role
2020	Knuckledust	Hard Eight	
2021	Nightride	Budge	
2022	Texas Chainsaw Massacre	Richter	
2024	Utopia	Damon	
TBA	Landlines †	TBA	Filming

=== Television ===
Year	Title	Role	Notes
2010	The Tudors	Richard Leland	2 episodes
2012	Game of Thrones	Stark messenger	Episode: "The Prince of Winterfell"
2013	Raw	Niall	3 episodes
2013	An Crisis	Christian	6 episodes
2014–2018	Vikings	Aethelwulf	Recurring role (seasons 2–3); Main role (seasons 4–5); 36 episodes
2018	Striking Out	Sam Dunbar	6 episodes
2019	Dublin Murders	Sam O'Neill	Recurring role; 8 episodes
2022	Redemption	Eoin Molony	Main role
2022	The Head	Alec Kurtz	Main role
2022–2024	The Dry	Jack	Main role
2024–2025	Conflict	Maj. Brady	Miniseries; 5 episodes
2025	House of Guinness	William Randall Roberts	Supporting role; 3 episodes

=== Music videos ===
Year	Title	Artist	Role
2016	"Cherry Wine"	Hozier	Man

== Awards and nominations ==
Year	Award	Category	Result	Work
2014	Cork Film Festival	International	Won	Patrick's Day
2014	Galway Film Festival	Bingham Ray New Talent Award	Nominated	Patrick's Day
2014	Hell's Half Mile Film & Music Festival, Michigan	Best Actor in a Lead Role - Film	Won	Patrick's Day
2015	Berlin International Film Festival	EFP Shooting Stars Award, Ireland	Won	Patrick's Day
2015	Irish Film and Television Awards	Best Actor in a Lead Role - Film	Won	Patrick's Day
2015	Irish Film and Television Awards	Rising Star	Nominated	Patrick's Day and Vikings
2016	Irish Film and Television Awards	Actor in a Supporting Role in Drama	Won	Vikings
2017	Irish Film and Television Awards	Actor in a Supporting Role in Drama	Nominated	Vikings
2018	Irish Film and Television Awards	Actor in a Supporting Role in Drama	Nominated	Vikings
2019	Newport Beach Film Festival	Best Actor	Won	The Dig
2020	Irish Film and Television Awards	Actor in a Leading Role	Nominated	The Dig
2021	Irish Film and Television Awards	Actor in a Leading Role in Film	Nominated	Knuckledust
2022	Irish Film and Television Awards	Actor in a Leading Role in Film	Won	Nightride
