= IFTA Film & Drama Awards =

Irish annual film and TV awards

IFTA Film & Drama Award
- Current: 22nd Irish Film & Television Awards
- Country: Ireland
- Presented by: IFTA
- First award: 1999
- Website: ifta.ie/awards

The IFTA Film & Drama Awards are awards given by the Irish Film & Television Academy for Irish television and film. The awards were first presented in 1999. The ceremonies recognise Irish creative talent working in film, drama, and television, and winners receive a cast bronze statuette.

== History ==
Dubbed by the media as 'The Irish Oscars', the inaugural Irish Film & Television Awards Ceremony took place at the Burlington Hotel (Dublin) in 1999, and was attended by some notable stars such as Ralph Fiennes, Charlize Theron, James Nesbitt, and Andrea Corr. Following growth of the Irish film and television industries, the Academy in 2015 split the Awards into two ceremonies: the IFTA Film & Drama Awards and the IFTA Television Awards, which take place in April and October respectively. The ceremonies recognise Irish creative talent working in film and television. Winners receive a cast bronze statuette.

== Categories ==
=== Film ===
- Best Film
- Best Director
- Best Script
- Best Lead Actor
- Best Lead Actress
- Best Supporting Actor
- Best Supporting Actress
- Best International Film
- Best International Actor
- Best International Actress
- Rising Star
- George Morrison Feature Documentary Award

=== Short film ===
- Best Animated Short
- Best Short Film

=== Television drama ===
- Best Drama
- Best Director
- Best Lead Actor
- Best Lead Actress
- Best Supporting Actor
- Best Supporting Actress

=== Craft ===
- Best Cinematography
- Best Editing
- Best Production Design
- Best VFX
- Best Make Up & Hair
- Best Sound
- Best Costume
- Best Original Music

=== Lifetime Achievement Award ===
The IFTA Lifetime Achievement Award has been presented to:

- Neil Jordan 2003
- Maureen O'Hara 2004
- David Kelly 2005
- Gay Byrne 2006
- George Morrison 2009
- Niall Tóibín 2011
- Fionnula Flanagan 2012
- Jim Sheridan 2015
- Gabriel Byrne 2018
- Judi Dench 2023
- Stephen Rea 2024
- Colm Meaney 2025

== Previous ceremonies ==
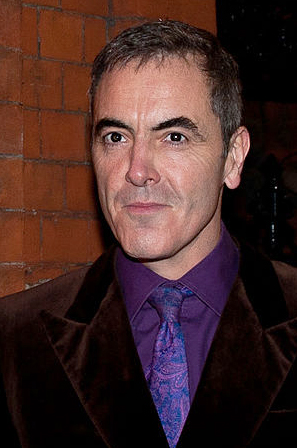
James Nesbitt hosted the third, fourth and fifth events.

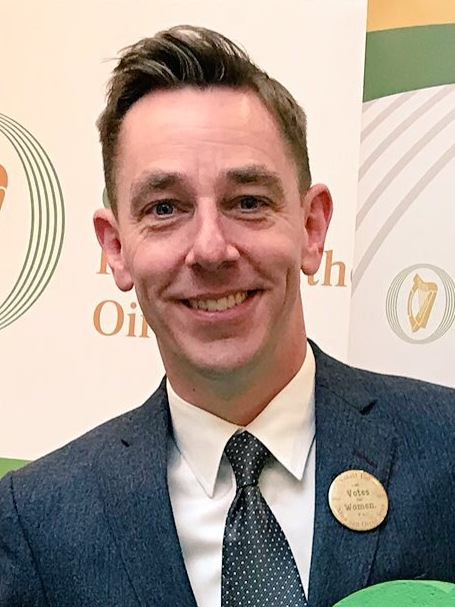
Ryan Tubridy hosted the sixth, seventh and eighth events.

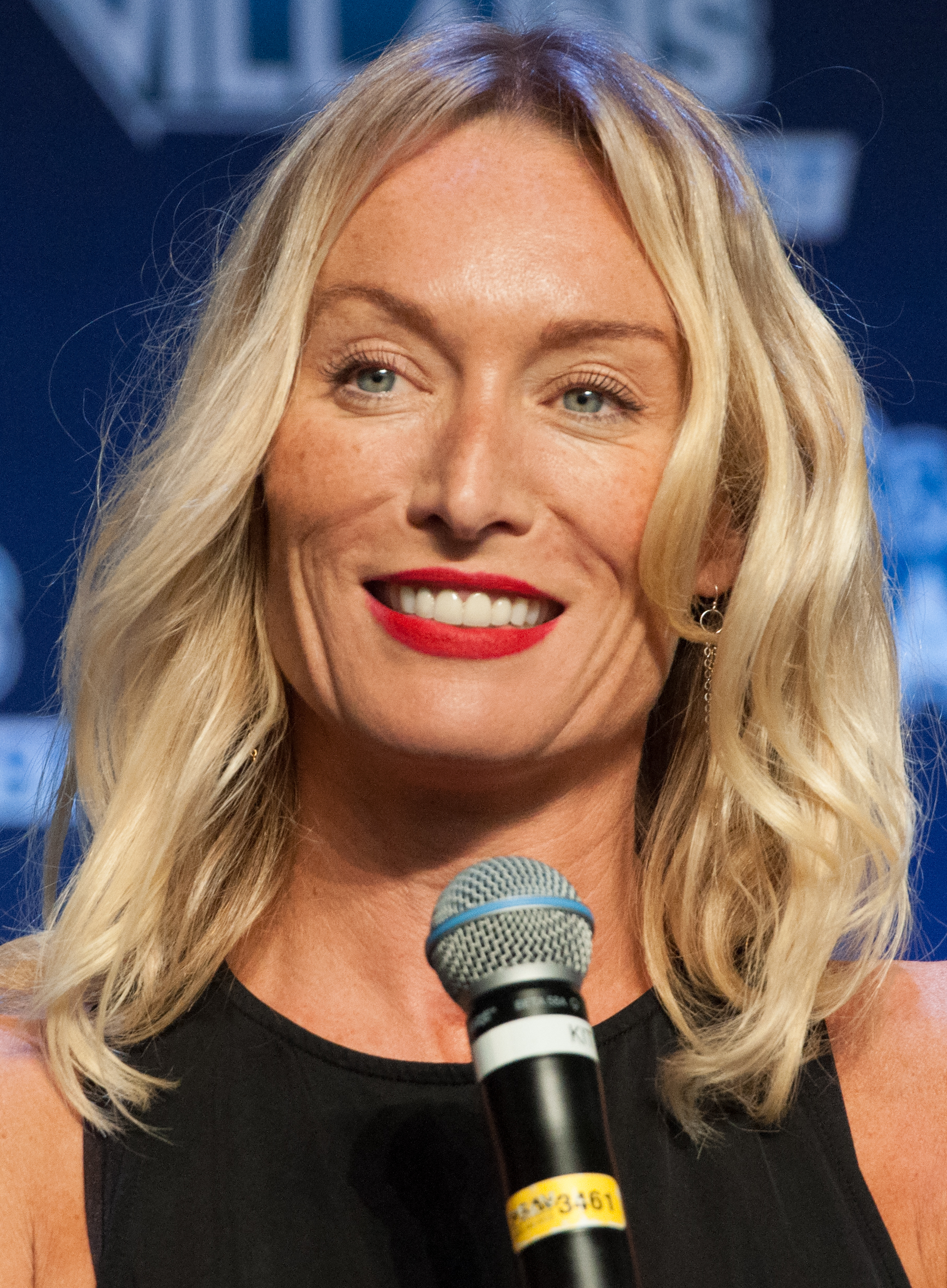
Victoria Smurfit hosted the ninth event.

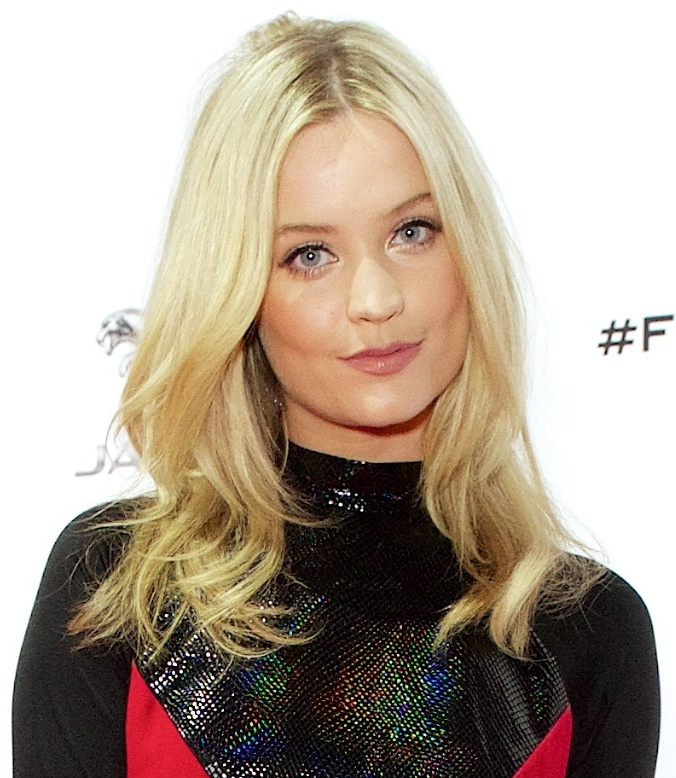
Laura Whitmore co-hosted the thirteenth event.

The following is a listing of all Irish Film Television Awards Ceremonies since its inaugural event in 1999.

Ceremony	Date	Best Film winner	Host(s)	Venue
Irish Film & Television Awards	28 November 1999	The General	Marian Finucane	RTÉ Studios Dublin
Irish Film & Television Awards	6 December 2000	Angela's Ashes	Marie Jones	The Waterfront, Belfast
1st Irish Film & Television Awards	1 November 2003	Intermission	James Nesbitt	Burlington Hotel
2nd Irish Film & Television Awards	30 October 2004	Omagh	James Nesbitt	Burlington Hotel
3rd Irish Film & Television Awards	5 November 2005	Pavee Lackeen	James Nesbitt	Royal Dublin Society
4th Irish Film & Television Awards	10 February 2007	The Wind That Shakes the Barley	Ryan Tubridy	Royal Dublin Society
5th Irish Film & Television Awards	17 February 2008	Garage	Ryan Tubridy	Gaiety Theatre
6th Irish Film & Television Awards	14 February 2009	Hunger	Ryan Tubridy	Burlington Hotel
7th Irish Film & Television Awards	20 February 2010	The Eclipse	Victoria Smurfit	Burlington Hotel
8th Irish Film & Television Awards	12 February 2011	As If I Am Not There	Simon Delaney	Convention Centre
9th Irish Film & Television Awards	11 February 2012	The Guard	Simon Delaney	Convention Centre
10th Irish Film & Television Awards	9 February 2013	What Richard Did	Simon Delaney	Convention Centre
11th Irish Film & Television Awards	5 April 2014	Calvary	Simon Delaney; Laura Whitmore	DoubleTree by Hilton Dublin – Burlington Road
12th Irish Film & Television Awards	24 May 2015	Song of the Sea	Caroline Morahan	Mansion House
IFTA Gala Television Awards 2015	22 October 2015	—N/a	Amanda Byram	DoubleTree by Hilton Dublin – Burlington Road
13th Irish Film & Television Awards	9 April 2016	Room	Deirdre O'Kane	Mansion House
14th Irish Film & Television Awards	8 April 2017	A Date for Mad Mary	Deirdre O'Kane	Mansion House
15th Irish Film & Television Awards	15 February 2018	Michael Inside	Deirdre O'Kane	Mansion House
16th Irish Film & Television Awards	18 October 2020	Ordinary Love and Black ’47	Deirdre O'Kane	Virtual ceremony
17th Irish Film & Television Awards	4 July 2021	Wolfwalkers	Gráinne Seoige	Virtual ceremony
18th Irish Film & Television Awards	12 March 2022	An Cailín Ciúin	Deirdre O'Kane	Virtual ceremony
19th Irish Film & Television Awards	7 May 2023	The Banshees of Inisherin	Deirdre O'Kane	Dublin Royal Convention Center
20th Irish Film & Television Awards	9 April 2024	That They May Face the Rising Sun	Baz Ashmawy	Dublin Royal Convention Centre
21st Irish Film & Television Awards	14 February 2025	Small Things Like These	Kevin McGahern	Dublin Royal Convention Centre
