= Ballymun Lullaby =

2011 documentary by Frank Berry

- Directed by: Frank Berry
- Produced by: Frank Berry
- Cinematography: Kevin Duffy
- Edited by: Frank Berry
- Music by: Daragh O'Toole
- Production company: Pulp Productions
- Release date: 16 December 2011 (Ireland)
- Running time: 72 minutes
- Country: Ireland
- Language: English

Ballymun Lullaby is a 2011 Irish documentary film directed by Frank Berry.

Berry talking about Ballymun Lullaby

== Premise ==
Music teacher Ron Cooney works with composer Daragh O'Toole to produce a collection of music that gives voice to the experience of children living in Ireland's only remaining high-rise housing estate.
