= Denis Conway (actor) =

Irish actor (born 1960)

- Born: Denis Conway; 21 September 1960 (age 65); Cork, Ireland
- Occupation: Actor
- Years active: 1994–present

Denis Conway (born 21 September 1960) is an Irish actor. He has had roles in the films Michael Collins (1996), Alexander (2004) and later as Brendan Close in Aisha (2022). Conway was the artistic director of Ouroboros Theatre Company for 10 years. He is also a member of the board of the Brian Friel Trust. As an Irish speaker, Conway has presented documentaries for TG4 such as Hollywood in Éirinn

== Awards ==
In 2008, at the 5th Irish Film & Television Awards, he was nominated for the Best Actor in Lead Role in Television for his work on the Running Mate.

In 2010, he won an Irish Theatre Award, in the "best actor" category, for his portrayal of the titular role in the Ouroboros Theatre Company's production of Shakespeare's Richard III. In 2013, he was nominated in the "best supporting actor" category for his portrayal of "Mitch" in the play A Streetcar Named Desire. He won the "best actor" award for the second time, in 2015, for his portrayal of "Irish Man" in Gate Theatre's production of Tom Murphy's The Gigli Concert.

== Filmography ==
=== Stage ===
Year	Title	Role	Notes
2006	The Walworth Farce	Dinny	Druid
2010	Penelope	Dunne	Druid (World Tour)
2013	A Streetcar named Desire	Mitch	Gate Theatre
2014	The Gigli Concert	Irish Man	Gate Theatre
2018	Glengarry Glen Ross	Dave Moss	UK ATG Tour
2018	The Lieutenant of Inishmore	Donny	Noël Coward Theatre, West End, London
2023	Hangmen	Harry	Gaiety Theatre, Dublin

=== Film ===
Year	Title	Role	Notes
1996	Michael Collins	Republican #1	
1997	I Went Down	Garda	
2002	Reign of Fire	Mole #2	
2003	Intermission	Detective #2	
2004	Alexander	Nearchus	
2005	Boy Eats Girl	Craig	
2006	The Wind that Shakes the Barley	Priest	
2006	The Tiger's Tail	Bertie Brennan	
2007	Garage	Garda Michael	
2009	Zonad	Doctor Glonad	
2015	Brooklyn	Mr. Brown	
2015	The Truth Commissioner	Alec Reid	
2019	End of Sentence	Father Tobin	
2019	Sweetness in the Belly	Office Capps	
2022	Aisha	Brendan Close	

=== Television ===
Year	Title	Role	Notes
1995	The Governor	Coach Driver	TV series
2000	Casualty	Geoff Peake	Medical Drama
2000	Yesterday's Children	Father Kelly	TV movie
2000	Trí Scéal	Seamus	TV series
2001	Rebel Heart	O'Driscoll	TV series
2002	On Home Ground	Paul Crowley	TV series
2003	Bachelors Walk	Gary	TV series
2003	The Return	David Hunt	TV movie
2004	The Clinic	Liam Quinn	TV series
2005	Showbands	Alan Rendell	TV movie
2006	Hide & Seek	Mickey Kelly	TV series
2006	Showbands II	Alan Rendell	TV movie
2007	The Running Mate	Vincent Flynn	TV mini series
2010	Single Handed	Inspector O'Kane	TV mini series
2013	Scúp	Diarmuid	TV mini series
2017	Fair City	Robbie Cusack	TV series
2018	The Bailout	Brian Cowen	TV mini series
2021	North Sea Connection	Sergeant Egan	TV mini series
