= Phil Lynott: Songs for While I'm Away =

Documentary film about Phil Lynott

- Official release poster
- Directed by: Emer Reynolds

Original release
- Release: 23 October 2020

Phil Lynott: Songs For While I'm Away is a 2020 documentary film about the life of singer-songwriter Phil Lynott and his career with Thin Lizzy. It aired on BBC Two on 23 October 2020 and was directed by Emer Reynolds. It features archival footage and testimonials from peers about Lynott's magnetism as a performer and his brilliance as a musician. The film's title is taken from a poetry collection of Lynott's published in 1974 (and, again, in a compendium format with another collection, in 1997).

The documentary features interviews from Lynott, Scott Gorham, Lynott's ex-wife and their children, along with other musicians such as Midge Ure, James Hetfield of Metallica and Adam Clayton of U2.

== Reception ==
Songs For While I’m Away received mainly positive reviews. On Rotten Tomatoes, it has a 100% "fresh" rating and is considered "the definitive Phil Lynott documentary." The Irish Times gave Songs For While I’m Away 3 out of 5 stars, criticising the lack of mention of Lynott's heroin addiction and there being no analysis of "the dynamics of the music." The Guardian also gave Songs For While I’m Away 3 out of 5 stars.
