= Róise & Frank =

- Poster
- Directed by: Rachael Moriarty; Peter Murphy
- Written by: Rachael Moriarty; Peter Murphy
- Produced by: Suzanne Colwell; Cúán Mac Conghail
- Starring: Bríd Ní Neachtain; Cillian O'Gairbhi
- Cinematography: Peter Robertson
- Edited by: Colin Campbell; Mary Crumlish
- Music by: Colm Mac Con Iomaire
- Production company: Macalla Teoranta
- Distributed by: Break Out Pictures
- Release dates: 27 February 2022 (Dublin); 16 September 2022 (Ireland)
- Running time: 84 minutes
- Country: Ireland
- Language: Irish
- Box office: $80,196

Róise & Frank ([ɾˠoːʃə], ROE-shuh) is a 2022 Irish comedy-drama film directed and written by Rachael Moriarty and Peter Murphy, and starring Bríd Ní Neachtain. The film is set in Ring, a town within Gaeltacht na nDéise in County Waterford.

== Plot ==
Two years after the death of her husband Frank, Róise becomes increasingly isolated from those around her, going through the motions of her life. An unchipped, apparently ownerless, dog appears at Róise's doorstep & is insistent on staying with Róise. The dog manages to reawaken Róise and ends up reconnecting her to her family & community.

Róise becomes very attached to the mysterious dog, who seemingly possesses traits of her late husband Frank. Róise, believing the dog to be her husband’s reincarnation, begins calling the dog "Frank". Róise's son, Alan, becomes frightened of his mothers obsession with "Frank", worried that his mother is losing her mental faculties from the continued absence of his father. However, the greater community is sympathetic with Róise's belief and humours her until they too, connect the behaviors of the dog to her late husband.

Donncha, the next-door neighbour, acts antagonistic to "Frank" after Róise does not allow his advances. He drugs the dog and has him sent to the pound, asserting that the dog is violent and dangerous. However, the vet at the pound investigates "Frank" and finds him to be of cool temper. He allows "Frank" to be adopted by another family, now being named "Sparky" by his new owners. Róise, Alan & Maidhcí investigate and find "Frank" with the help of the vet. Seeing the dog help another family cope with the loss of a loved one, Róise decides to adopt a new dog and continue her life without "Frank".

== Cast ==
- Bríd Ní Neachtain as Róise Uí Mheadhra
- Liam Ó Lonáin as Himself
- Cillian Ó Gairbhí as Alan Ó Meadhra
- Lorcan Cranitch as Donncha
- Ruadhán de Faoite as Maidhcí Ó Loingsigh
- Barley, a canine actor, as Frank

== Production ==
Róise & Frank was filmed during the summer of 2019 and is filmed & set in the coastal Gaeltacht of An Rinn. Produced by Dublin-based television and film production company Macalla Teoranta. The film was funded & supported by TG4, Screen Ireland and the Broadcasting Authority of Ireland (BAI), specifically the film was awarded €1.2million funding through the Cine4 scheme in May 2018.

In 2019, Mo Ghrá Buan, (my eternal love) was the working title.

== Release ==
Dog Friendly Release US wide-release

The film has a 100% rating on Rotten Tomatoes, based on 12 reviews.

== Accolades ==
Year	Award	Category	Recipients	Outcome
2022	Dublin International Film Festival	Best Ensemble	Róise & Frank	Won
2022	Santa Barbara Film Festival	The Audience Award Winner	Róise & Frank	Won
