= Emer Reynolds =

Irish film editor and director

- Occupations: Film editor and director
- Years active: 1992 - present

Emer Reynolds is an Irish film editor and director, based in Dublin, Ireland.

== Career ==
Reynolds' editing career began in 1992 with the independent film The Visit. She subsequently edited features including The Most Fertile Man in Ireland and The Actors. Reynolds was awarded with five IFTA Film & Drama Awards for Best Editing across several films. These awards were received in the years 2004, 2005, 2011, 2014, and 2015.

Reynolds' directorial debut in documentary film directing was Here Was Cuba, co-directed with John Murray. This collaboration marked their third project together, following Broken Tail and Crossing the Line. In 2007, she directed the six-part drama series Trouble in Paradise for RTE.

In 2017, Reynolds directed and wrote the feature documentary The Farthest, which received the George Morrison Feature Documentary Award at the 19th Irish Film & Television Awards.

In 2020, she directed Phil Lynott: Songs for While I'm Away, a documentary film about the life of singer-songwriter Phil Lynott.
