= Antoine Ó Flatharta =

Irish playwright and screenwriter

Antoine Ó Flatharta is an Irish playwright and screenwriter who writes in English and Irish.

== Playwriting credits ==
- Ag Ealaín In Éirinn
- An Fear Bréige
- An Solas Dearg
- Aois na hÓige
- Between Venus and Mars
- Blood Guilty
- City Mission
- Dream Walker
- Gaeilgeoirí
- Imeachtaí na Saoirse
- Silverlands
- The Native Ground
- Wáltsáil Abhaile

== Movie/film credits ==
- Stella Days
- An Bonnán Buí

== Television ==
- An Crisis and Crisis Eile
- On Home Ground
- Grace Harte
- Ros na Rún
