= Tarrac =

2022 Irish film

- Theatrical film poster
- Directed by: Declan Recks
- Written by: Eugene O'Brien
- Produced by: Clíona Ní Bhuachalla
- Starring: Kelly Gough; Lorcan Cranitch; Kate Nic Chonaonaigh; Kate Finegan; Rachel Feeney; Cillian Ó Gairbhí
- Cinematography: Patrick Jordan
- Edited by: Gareth Young
- Music by: Kormac
- Release dates: July 9, 2022 (Galway); October 6, 2023 (Ireland)
- Running time: 96 mins.
- Country: Ireland
- Language: Irish

Tarrac (sometimes punctuated as Tarrac!) is a 2022 Irish-language drama film, directed by Declan Recks and written by Eugene O'Brien. It stars Kelly Gough, Lorcan Cranitch, Kate Finegan, Cillian Ó Gairbhí, Rachel Feeney, and Kate Nic Chonaonaigh. It premiered at the Galway Film Fleadh in 2022, before being released in Ireland and the UK the following year of 2023.

== Synopsis ==
Tarrac is a contemporary drama set on the coastlines of Kerry in the tough world of Naomhóg racing.

== Cast ==
- Kelly Gough as Aoife
- Lorcan Cranitch as Bear
- Kate Nic Chonaonaigh as Jude
- Kate Finegan as Aisling
- Rachel Feeney as Naomi
- Cillian Ó Gairbhí as Noellie
- Liam Heffernan as Jim
- Don Wycherley as Iresoir Raidió
- Kathleen Kennedy as Gainíon Frances
- Eugene O'Brien as Joe Áitiúl

== Reception ==
On the review aggregator website Rotten Tomatoes, 89% of 9 critics' reviews are positive, with an average rating of 6.20/10.

Lisa Dempsey of Film Ireland praised the "wonderful performances" of the main cast (especially actors Kelly Gough and Lorcan Cranitch), while Gemma Creagh—of the same magazine—added "the four women are something powerful to behold". Fionnuala Halligan of Screen Daily called the film "a feel-good feature". Jane Fae of Eye for Film applauded the whole supporting cast, particularly the "intriguing, asexual performance" from actor Cillian Ó Gairbhí.

Cath Clarke of The Guardian lauded director Declan Recks for directing "with a steady hand". Donald Clarke of The Irish Times complimented writer Eugene O'Brien for "propelling past clichés" in the script. Paul Whitington of the Irish Independent referred to it as "a worthwhile watch". Graeme Tuckett of The Post loved how "the Irish dialogue is easy on the ear". Clotilde Chinnici of Loud and Clear Reviews says "the audience cannot help but root for" the characters.

Brian Viner of the Daily Mail stated "it's a familiar sporting underdog story, brimming with all the usual clichés". Kevin Maher of The Times chided the film for being "painfully predictable". Declan Burke of the Irish Examiner remarked that the film is "rather undermined by a story that is arrow-straight". And Mansel Stimpson of Film Review Daily opined, "Indeed, its storyline is so simple, so unoriginal, that its impact is inevitably limited."
