= The 34th =

- Directed by: Linda Cullen; Vanessa Gildea
- Produced by: Linda Cullen; Vanessa Gildea
- Edited by: Cúán Mac Conghail
- Production company: COCO Television
- Release dates: August 2017 (GAZE Festival); November 1, 2018
- Country: Ireland

The 34th: The Story of Marriage Equality in Ireland is an Irish documentary film by Linda Cullen and Vanessa Gildea. The film tells the story of the people who formed Marriage Equality in Ireland, and explores the events that led to the Thirty-fourth Amendment of the Constitution, which amended the Constitution of Ireland by referendum to permit marriage to be contracted by two persons without distinction as to their sex.

== The film ==
The film uses interviews with former board members and staff from Marriage Equality alongside archive material to outline the tell the story of their campaign, spanning from the Zappone v. Revenue Commissioners high court case in 2006 (also known as the KAL Case) to the thirty-fourth Amendment of the Constitution of Ireland in 2015.

The 34th has garnered acclaim among critics and audiences, winning the Audience Award and the Spirit of Gaze Award at the 25th Annual Gaze LGBT Film Festival in 2017, and earning an official selection at the Queer Screen's Mardi Gras Film Festival in 2018. The film also won the Audience Award "Dokula" at the 29th Hamburg International Queer Film Festival.

== Production ==
The 34th was directed and produced by Linda Cullen and Vanessa Gildea, and edited by Cúán Mac Conghail.

== Release ==
The film premiered at the 25th Annual Gaze LGBT Film Festival in 2017, where it won the Audience Award and the Spirit of Gaze Award. It was released on Netflix in the UK and Ireland on the 4th of November 2018.

=== Accolades ===
Award	Category	Recipients	Result
Gaze LGBT Film Festival Awards 2017	Audience Award	The 34th	Won
Gaze LGBT Film Festival Awards 2017	Spirit of Gaze Award	The 34th	Won
Hamburg International Queer Film Festival	Audience Award	The 34th	Won
