= Michael Inside =

- Theatrical release poster
- Directed by: Frank Berry
- Written by: Frank Berry
- Produced by: Donna Eperon; Tristan Orpen Lynch; Aoife O'Sullivan
- Starring: Dafhyd Flynn; Lalor Roddy; Moe Dunford
- Cinematography: Tom Comerford
- Edited by: Colin Campbell
- Music by: Daragh O'Toole
- Production companies: White Direction Films; Subotica Entertainment; Irish Film Board
- Distributed by: Wildcard Distribution
- Release dates: 14 July 2017 (Galway Film Fleadh); 6 April 2018 (Ireland)
- Running time: 96 minutes
- Country: Ireland
- Language: English
- Box office: €53,255 ($61,017)

Michael Inside is a 2017 Irish prison film written, directed and co-produced by Frank Berry. It was nominated for four Irish Film & Television Awards and won the Best Film prize.

== Plot ==
18-year-old Michael McCrea lives with his grandfather in a Dublin housing estate. Michael's father is in prison and his mother died of an overdose when he was young. Michael aims to put his life on the right path and find work, but he is caught in possession of a bag of drugs belonging to the older brother of a friend, and sentenced to three months imprisonment.

== Production ==
During the film's production, research was undertaken using discussions with offenders who had passed through the Irish Prison Service's Pathways programme. Filming took place in Cork Prison (the old building, closed in 2016) and Dublin and received funding from the Irish Film Board.

== Release ==
Michael Inside premiered at the 2017 Galway Film Fleadh, and also played at the 2017 Cork Film Festival. It went on general release in Ireland on 6 April 2018.

== Reception ==
Michael Inside has received critical acclaim in Ireland. On review aggregator website Rotten Tomatoes, the film holds an approval rating of 100%, based on 14 reviews, and an average rating of 9/10. It earned five-star reviews from Joe.ie and entertainment.ie.

=== Accolades ===
Awards	Category	Recipients and nominees	Result
Cork Film Festival	Audience Award	Michael Inside	Won
Galway Film Fleadh	Best Irish Film	Michael Inside	Won
Galway Film Fleadh	Bingham Ray New Talent Award	Dafhyd Flynn	Won
Galway Film Fleadh	Bingham Ray New Talent Award	Donna Eperon	Nominated
Irish Film & Television Awards	Best Film	Michael Inside	Won
Irish Film & Television Awards	Best Director	Frank Berry	Nominated
Irish Film & Television Awards	Best Script	Frank Berry	Nominated
Irish Film & Television Awards	Best Actor in a Leading Role	Dafhyd Flynn	Nominated
