= Lakelands (film) =

- Directed by: Robert Higgins; Patrick McGivney
- Written by: Robert Higgins; Patrick McGivney
- Starring: Éanna Hardwicke; Danielle Galligan
- Production company: Harp Media
- Distributed by: Wildcard Distribution
- Release date: 9 July 2022 (Galway)
- Running time: 98 minutes
- Country: Ireland
- Language: English

Lakelands is a 2022 Irish drama film by Robert Higgins and Patrick McGivney of Harp Media in their feature film debut.

== Premise ==
The film centres on a small local small-town GAA football "outside the bright lights of Croke Park". Cian Reilly (Eanna Hardwicke) is the local star GAA player and a local farmer. Cian lives a carefree life as the recently appointed captain of his local team. He constantly argues with his father Diarmaid (Lorcan Cranitch) on the farm. He spends his free time with his friends living a carefree lifestyle of drinking and partying. Everything changes when one night Cian goes to a nightclub and gets assaulted incurring a pretty significant head injury.

Cian tries to ignore initial medical advice and tries to return to playing. He meets Grace (Danielle Galligan) an old school crush who has returned to the town to care for her ailing father. Grace is a nurse in England and she tries to advise Cian. She recommends that he see a specialist when he tells her of headaches and some worrying symptoms. Although Cian is interested in Grace she rebuffs any romantic overtures. Cian is eventually advised by his consultant that he has a severe concussion and it may take months to recover from (or more than likely he may never recover from it).

Ignoring the advice Cian tries to play on but winds up coming to blows with his teammates, friends and coach Bernie (Gary Lydon). At farm he is constantly arguing with Diarmaid, although his father spots something is off with his son and employs a helper on the farm who Cian angrily berates. Cian in denial about his injury goes out looking to confront the guys who beat him up but luckily is spotted by the local Garda who drives him home. Grace implores Cian to stop pushing himself and allow himself to heal. Faced with retiring from the sport he loves, he angrily lashes out insulting Grace's father by labelling him an alcoholic.

Grace's father passes away suddenly and Diarmaid encounters his son crying and finally admitting something is wrong. This leads to a reconciliation and Cian starts to accept his lot. Cian apologises to the farm hand. Bernie tries to coax Cian to return to the club and at least try his hand at coaching but Cian decides to make a clean break. Cian then approaches Grace at her father's removal and apologises. At the funeral her boyfriend arrives from England and Cian bids them both goodbye. The next day Cian goes to the club and helps a young player perfect his game giving himself a form of closure. When he returns to the farm Grace turns up and there is a hope that something may happen. She asks him to remain in contact.

== Cast ==
- Éanna Hardwicke as Cian Reilly
- Danielle Galligan as Grace
- Lorcan Cranitch as Diarmuid
- Gary Lydon as Bernie
- Dafhyd Flynn as Sparky
- Dara Devaney as McGovern
- Lesley Conroy as Dr. Kelly
- Seamus O'Rourke as Mulherne
- Felix Brown as Peter

== Production ==
Patrick O’Neill of Wildcard executive produced the film. Principal photography took place on location in Granard, County Longford in late 2021, wrapping at the end of November. The project received support from Creative Ireland, Longford Arts Office, Backstage Theatre, Longford LEO, and Screen Ireland as well as winning the Bankside Films Marketplace Award at the 2021 Galway Film Fleadh back in August.

== Release ==
Wildcard is handling the distribution of the film in Ireland and the UK. It is expected to have a theatrical release. The film premiered the 2022 Galway Film Fleadh. It will have a U.S. screening at the 2023 Santa Barbara International Film Festival.

== Reception ==
Lakelands has received critical acclaim in Ireland and the UK. On review aggregator website Rotten Tomatoes, the film holds an approval rating of 100%, based on 16 reviews.

== Awards and nominations ==
Year	Award	Category	Nominee(s)	Result	Ref.
2022	Galway Film Fleadh	Best Irish Film	Lakelands	Won	
2022	Galway Film Fleadh	Bingham Ray New Talent Award	Éanna Hardwicke and Danielle Galligan	Won	
2022	Kerry Film Festival	Best Film	Lakelands	Won	
2023	Irish Film & Television Awards	Best Film	Lakelands	Pending	
2023	Irish Film & Television Awards	Lead Actor - Film	Éanna Hardwicke	Pending	
2023	Irish Film & Television Awards	Lead Actress – Film	Danielle Galligan	Pending	
2023	Irish Film & Television Awards	Original Music	Daithi	Pending	
2023	Dublin Film Critics' Circle	Best Irish Film	Lakelands	Won	
