= Metal Heart (film) =

Irish film, directed by Hugh O'Conor

- Directed by: Hugh O'Conor
- Written by: Paul Murray
- Produced by: Claire McCaughley; Rebecca O'Flanagan
- Starring: Jordanne Jones; Leah McNamara; Moe Dunford; Seán Doyle; Aaron Heffernan
- Cinematography: Eoin McLoughlin
- Music by: John McPhillips
- Production companies: Treasure Entertainment; Head Gear Films; Metrol Technology
- Distributed by: Sentioar
- Release dates: July 2018 (Galway Film Fleadh); 28 June 2019
- Running time: 90 minutes
- Country: Ireland
- Language: English
- Box office: $7,582

Metal Heart is a 2018 Irish comedy film, directed by Hugh O'Conor and written by Paul Murray, about warring sisters in Dublin. It was O'Connor's feature film directorial debut.

== Premise ==
Twin sisters Emma (Jordanne Jones) and Chantal (Leah McNamara) get into a conflict when left alone one summer in Dublin by their parents while awaiting their exam results.

== Cast ==
The film also stars Moe Dunford, Aaron Heffernan, Sean Doyle, Yasmine Akram and Dylan Moran.

== Release ==
Metal Heart premiered at the 2018 Galway Film Fleadh, where Jordanne Jones won the Bingham Ray award for Best Newcomer. Hugh O'Conor was nominated for the Independent Spirit Award at its international premiere at the Santa Barbara International Film Festival, where it received positive reviews from Variety and the Hollywood Reporter. In 2018, the film screened at the Dublin Comic Con. It has also screened at the Seattle International Film Festival, the Newport Beach Film Festival, and the Glasgow Film Festival.

It opened in Irish cinemas on 28 July 2019. The film was distributed internationally by Bankside.

=== Reception ===
The film received positive reviews. On Rotten Tomatoes, it has an 88% freshness rating. The Irish Times compared the film to those of John Hughes, writing, "Metal Heart is so stuffed with good dialogue spoken by good actors that the familiarity hardly matters...Arriving at a time when the world seems in a permanent squabble with itself, Metal Heart offers a welcome heap of generosity." Screen Daily made a similar comparison to Hughes, adding, "[Director] O’Conor has made the best of his budgetary limitations to draw some strong but light-hearted performances in a likable and promising debut clearly made for audiences to sit back and enjoy."

The Hollywood Reporter highlighted the script and two lead actresses, adding, "With a light touch and a knowing regard, O'Conor manages to avoid the genre's most egregious cliches and simplistic life lessons, instead focusing on the sisters' often amusing rivalry and their ultimately unshakable familial bond. Variety praised the film's direction, writing, and screenplay, but said the film "hurts for a more feminine perspective, lacking the kind of specificity that would have made such material excel."
