= An Crisis =

Irish comedy television series

- Title card
- Also known as: Crisis Eile
- Genre: political satire, sitcom
- Written by: Antoine Ó Flatharta
- Directed by: Charlie McCarthy
- Starring: Risteárd Cooper; Bláthnaid Ní Chofaigh; Conor MacNeill; Norma Sheahan; Michelle Beamish; Kate Nic Chonaonaigh; Donncha Crowley; Helen Norton; Jamie O'Neill; Moe Dunford; Mark Lambert; Don Wycherley
- Music by: Ray Harman
- Country of origin: Ireland
- Original languages: Irish, English
- No. of seasons: 2
- No. of episodes: 12

Production
- Cinematography: Richard Kendrick
- Editor: Kevin Lavelle
- Camera setup: Multiple-camera
- Running time: 24–27 minutes
- Production company: Wildfire Films

Original release
- Network: TG4
- Release: 7 April 2010 – 20 February 2013

An Crisis ("The Crisis", using the Irish article and the English noun) is an Irish comedy television series which was first broadcast on TG4 in 2010 as a six-part miniseries satirising the inner workings of an Irish-language quango. It was written by Antoine Ó Flatharta and directed by Charlie McCarthy.

A sequel, titled Crisis Eile (IPA: [ˈɛlʲə]; "Another Crisis") aired in 2013. The action shifts to the European Commission, with Maeve Kelly Clarke (Bláthnaid Ní Chofaigh) exiled to Brussels as Ireland's new Commissioner.

== Production ==
Location filming took place in Killiney and St Stephen's Green. The series received funding from the Sound and Vision scheme of the Broadcasting Authority of Ireland.

== Plot ==
Crisis Eile title card

An Chomhairle Teanga (ACT, "The Language Council"), an Irish-language government agency, deals with cutbacks after the post-2008 Irish economic downturn, media scrutiny and a difficult new Minister.

== Cast ==
=== Both series ===
- Conor MacNeill as Ciarán Mac Ionraic, ACT's financial controller. From Northern Ireland and with a chip on his shoulder about it, as well as a crush on Aoife. In Crisis Eile, he becomes Chef de Cabinet for Maeve Kelly Clarke.
- Norma Sheahan as Emer de Barra. ACT employee. A lesbian with a young baby. In Crisis Eile she works with SPIEL (Support and Protection for Inter-European Languages)
- Michelle Beamish as Aoife McBride, ACT's receptionist. A failed Irish dancer, she spends her time at work doing yoga and meditating to the sound of Raidió na Gaeltachta's death notices.
- Donncha Crowley as Muiris, longtime civil servant and etymologist who spends his days doing crosswords. In Crisis Eile he moves to Brussels as an archivist.
- Kate Nic Chonaonaigh as Caoimhe Ní Chuinn, an assessor sent in by the Minister to decide if ACT should be shut down. In Crisis Eile she becomes a junior minister.

=== An Crisis only ===
- Risteárd Cooper as Setanta De Paor, acting director of ACT for ten years.
- Caitríona Ní Mhurchú as Deirdre De Paor, violinist wife of Setanta who runs away with a Hungarian fellow musician.
- Don Wycherley as Donncha, the Minister. Has a voice reminiscent of Michael D. Higgins and a grudge against Setanta
- Maeve Fitzgerald as Eileen, partner to Caoimhe

=== Crisis Eile only ===
- Bláthnaid Ní Chofaigh as Maeve Kelly Clarke, Transport Minister exiled to Brussels as punishment for her many gaffes and scandals.
- Helen Norton as Ana Conda, a Spaniard. Maeve's deputy Chef de Cabinet and PR spokeswoman.
- Jamie O'Neill as Peter Westerville, a German. Maeve's Climate Action officer.
- Moe Dunford as Christian
- Mark Lambert as Van de Veld, President of the European Commission.

== Reception ==
An Crisis was well-received, the Connacht Tribune calling it "one of the most entertaining things on TV at the moment, poking fun at so many sacred cows that you wonder how they get away with it." The Irish Times noted An Crisis' "sharp satirical bite" and said it was "a subversive subject for TG4 to give the green light to".

It was shown at the Monte-Carlo Television Festival where it was nominated for six Golden Nymph Awards.

An Crisis was nominated for a Special Irish Language Award at the 8th Irish Film & Television Awards.
