= Acceptable Risk (TV series) =

- Cover of the Region 1 DVD
- Genre: Crime drama
- Created by: Ron Hutchinson
- Directed by: Kenneth Gleenan
- Starring: Elaine Cassidy; Morten Suurballe; Angeline Ball; Lisa Hogg; Geordie Johnson; Paul Popowich; Risteárd Cooper
- Theme music composer: Michel Corriveau
- Country of origin: Ireland
- Original language: English
- No. of series: 1
- No. of episodes: 6

Production
- Executive producers: David Crean; Jane Gogan; Anna-Sue Greenberg; Jamie D. Greenberg
- Producers: Stephen Greenberg; Siobhán Bourke
- Production location: Dublin
- Cinematography: Tim Fleming
- Editors: David Di Francesco; Chantal Lussier
- Running time: 60 minutes

Original release
- Network: RTÉ One
- Release: 24 September – 29 October 2017

Related
- Hidden Assets

Acceptable Risk is an Irish television crime drama series, broadcast on RTÉ, that first aired on 24 September 2017. Produced by Facet4 Media and Saffron Moon for RTÉ Television, Acceptable Risk stars Elaine Cassidy as Dublin-based Sarah Manning, whose husband Lee is murdered whilst on a business trip in Montreal. Filmed between Ireland and Canada, the first series, comprising six episodes, was broadcast during September and October 2017.

Subsequently, the series has been sold to the United States, where it made its North American debut on Acorn TV, and to the UK, where it debuted on Universal TV on 6 December 2018. Internationally, the series has been distributed by DCD Rights and Acorn Media Enterprises. Following strong viewing figures for the series, which opened with viewing figures of more than 380,000, Facet4 Media have since confirmed a second series is in development.

Detective Emer Berry, a character from Acceptable Risk appeared in the six-part TV series Hidden Assets released in 2021.

== Production ==
Elaine Cassidy said of landing the part of Sarah Manning; "[What really attracted me to the role] was that the full six episodes were written [at the time of being offered the part]. That might seem weird but it's the way things used to be, and it doesn't happen that way now." Angeline Ball said of her role as Emer Byrne; "My agent had pre-warned me that it wasn't glamorous but I thought that was even better, I really wanted a role like this. I tried to make her as bland as possible in terms of her looks and her life; she really has nothing going on other than work and finding the truth."

Writer and creator Ron Hutchinson said of his idea for the series; "I wanted to explore the impact of globalisation from the angle of those working for international corporations in a Dublin far from the tourist image of the city. It's a world which offers a high salary and a great lifestyle to those who are part of it."

== Cast ==
=== Main ===
- Elaine Cassidy as Sarah Manning
- Morten Suurballe as Hans Werner Hoffman
- Angeline Ball as Det. Sgt. Emer Byrne
- Lisa Hogg as Nuala Mulvaney
- Geordie Johnson as Detective Charles Dusquene
- Paul Popowich as Lee Manning
- Risteárd Cooper as Barry Lehane
- Lorcan Cranitch as Ch. Supt. James Nulty
- Rory Nolan as Morrice O'Hanlon

=== Supporting ===
- Catherine Walker as Deirdre Kilbride
- Charlie Kelly as Aidan O'Sullivan
- Kate Moran as Anna Coyle
- Madeleine Knight as Mila Beck
- Eddie Jackson as Cormac Walsh
- Dearbhla Molloy as Marie Heffernan
- Adjoa Andoh as Margaret Kroll
- Gloria Cramer Curtis as Rose Manning
- Elijah O'Sullivan as Eamonn Manning
- Karen Ardiff as Bridget MacNally
- Maria Tecce as Donna Welty
- Ali White as Theresa Lehane

== Episodes ==
=== Series 1 (2017) ===
No. overall	No. in series	Title	Directed by	Written by	Original release date	Viewers (millions)
1	1	"Episode 1"	Kenneth Gleenan	Ron Hutchinson	24 September 2017	0.38
Lee Manning, deal breaker and head of PR for multi-national drug company Gumbiner-Fischer, is found murdered on the streets of Montreal. Back in Dublin, his wife, Sarah, hears the news that she is once again widowed, having lost her first husband, Ciaran, a fellow employee of Gumbiner-Fischer, in a freak accident three years previously. Emer Byrne, a detective sergeant working for the Garda Síochána, is assigned to the case. Meanwhile, a known Irish criminal, Cormac Walsh, is picked up on CCTV trying to remove a tracking device from Lee's car, which remains in situ at Dublin airport. Later that evening, Sarah is paid a visit by Gumbiner-Fischer's head of security, Barry Lehane, who, after warning Sarah to refrain from investigating her husband's death, suffers a heart attack chasing a woman trying to remove a second tracker which had been placed under Sarah's car.
2	2	"Episode 2"	Kenneth Gleenan	Ron Hutchinson	1 October 2017	N/A
Emer discovers CCTV footage which shows the vehicle seen outside Sarah's house shortly before Barry's collapse entering the American Embassy in Dublin. Dusquene is approached by a German investigator, Mila Beck, who claims to have been sent by her government to determine if the German minister whom Lee was set to meet had any involvement in his death. Emer tries to pressure Cormac Walsh into giving up the identity of his handler. Sarah begins to suspect that secrets buried within Gumbiner-Fischer's past may have played a part in Lee's death.
3	3	"Episode 3"	Kenneth Gleenan	Ron Hutchinson	8 October 2017	N/A
After treading on the toes of some powerful enemies, Emer is taken off the case by her Chief Superintendent, James Nulty, who offers her an eight-week training course in London in the hope that she will refrain from digging any deeper. Cormac Walsh's death proves to be a turning point in the investigation as Sarah begins to turn her attention to her first husband's death, which she now suspects may not have been an accident.
4	4	"Episode 4"	Kenneth Gleenan	Ron Hutchinson	15 October 2017	N/A
Continuing to work on the case, Emer manages to track down a witness who claims that Lehane was responsible for Ciaran's murder, throwing him into the canal where he ultimately met his death. Sarah realises that Nuala and Patrick's former business is somehow connected to the case. Meanwhile, Nulty warns Hoffman and O'Hanlon that he wants no further involvement in their deal. Deidre turns up at O'Hanlon's farmhouse unannounced and overhears a conversation between the three men. As she makes a panicked phone call to Sarah asking to meet, Hoffman decides to take drastic action.
5	5	"Episode 5"	Kenneth Gleenan	Ron Hutchinson	22 October 2017	N/A
Nulty allows Emer to reopen the investigation into Ciaran's death, simultaneously giving her free rein to take the case as far as it needs to go. Dusquene approaches a member of a prominent Irish crime family in the hope of obtaining the name of the man who was responsible for Lee's death. Hoffman approaches the legal attaché, warning her to wind down the FBI's investigation into his business. Patrick discloses the details of the property that Gumbiner-Fischer are determined to keep quiet but surprisingly decides not to stick around to see the outcome of his revelation.
6	6	"Episode 6"	Kenneth Gleenan	Ron Hutchinson	29 October 2017	N/A
As the pieces of the puzzle slowly start to come together, Sarah and Emer realise that the disappearance of a young woman twenty-five years ago from the property Gumbiner-Fischer are keeping a close eye on could be the key to unlocking the motive behind the multiple deaths.
