= I Used to Live Here =

Film by Frank Berry

- Directed by: Frank Berry
- Written by: Frank Berry
- Produced by: Frank Berry; Donna Eperon (co-producer)
- Starring: Jordanne Jones; Dafhyd Flynn; James Kelly; Ross Geraghty; Nikita Rowley
- Cinematography: Colm Mullen
- Edited by: Frank Berry
- Music by: Daragh O'Toole
- Production company: Write Direction Films
- Release dates: 11 July 2014 (Galway Film Fleadh); 3 April 2015 (Ireland)
- Running time: 80 minutes
- Country: Ireland
- Language: English

I Used to Live Here is a 2014 Irish drama film written and directed by Frank Berry and starring Jordanne Jones.

== Cast ==
- Jordanne Jones as Amy Keane
- Dafhyd Flynn as Dylan
- James Kelly as Raymond
- Ross Geraghty as David
- Nikita Rowley as Ericka
- Ross Kelly as Smithy
- Ken Doyle as Tommy
- Laura O'Connor as Lucy
- Alicja Ayres as Dina

== Accolades ==
I Used to Live Here won Best Irish First Feature at the 2014 Galway Film Fleadh and was nominated for Best Film and Best Script (Film) at the 2015 Irish Film and Television Awards.
