= Aisha (2022 film) =

Film by Frank Berry

- Film poster
- Directed by: Frank Berry
- Written by: Frank Berry
- Produced by: Tristan Orpen Lynch; Aofie O'Sullivan; Donna Eperon; Sam Bisbee
- Starring: Letitia Wright; Josh O'Connor
- Cinematography: Tom Comerford
- Edited by: Colin Campbell
- Music by: Daragh O'Toole
- Production companies: Screen Ireland; BBC Film; Sky Cinema; Subotica; Write Direction Films
- Distributed by: Sky Cinema
- Release dates: 11 June 2022 (Tribeca); 17 November 2022 (United Kingdom)
- Running time: 94 minutes
- Country: Ireland
- Language: English

Aisha is a 2022 Irish drama film written and directed by Frank Berry. The film stars Letitia Wright and Josh O'Connor.

== Plot ==
Nigerian refugee Aisha Osagie develops a close friendship with former prisoner Conor Healy. Their friendship, however, soon looks to be short lived as Aisha's quest to be granted asylum in the Republic of Ireland comes under threat.

== Cast ==
- Letitia Wright as Aisha Osagie
- Josh O'Connor as Conor Healy
- Lorcan Cranitch as Peter Flood
- Denis Conway as Brendan Close
- Stuart Graham as Francis Manning
- Ian Toner as Liam Cantwell
- Ruth McCabe as Mrs. Keegan
- Dawn Bradfield as Michelle Campbell
- Theresa O'Connor as Deirde O'Dea
- Rosemary Aimiyekagbon as Moraya Osagie
- Emmanuel Hassan as Abdul Momoh
- Yemisi Ojo as Bes Emenaha
- Antionette Doyle as Habiba Momoh
- Tara Flynn as Catherine Levy
- Florence Adebambo as Ruykaya Momoh
- Aisling Reid as Louise Sheeran

== Production ==
In March 2021, it was announced Letitia Wright and Josh O'Connor would star in the film Provision written and directed by Frank Berry. Principal photography began in April 2021. In June 2021, the film was renamed Aisha.

== Release ==
Aisha had its world premiere at the Tribeca Film Festival on 11 June 2022, and was screened at the BFI London Film Festival on 6 October 2022. The film was theatrically released in Ireland and the United Kingdom by Sky Cinema on 17 November 2022. It was released in the United States by Samuel Goldwyn Films on 10 May 2024.

== Reception ==
On the review aggregator website Rotten Tomatoes, 98% of 42 critics' reviews are positive. The website's consensus reads: "Featuring outstanding performances from Letitia Wright and Josh O'Connor, Aisha is a sensitive and nuanced look at the immigrant experience." Metacritic, which uses a weighted average, assigned the film a score of 81 out of 100, based on 11 critics, indicating "universal acclaim".

Michael Nordine of Variety praises Wright for her performance, and the film for its naturalistic style, and concludes "The result isn't quite Kafka, but it's closer than it should be".
