= Frank Berry (director) =

Irish film director

- Occupations: Director; writer; producer
- Years active: 1997–present

Frank Berry is an Irish film director and screenwriter, known for his social realist dramas focused on marginalised characters. He directed the films Ballymun Lullaby (2011), I Used to Live Here (2014), Michael Inside (2017), and Aisha (2022).

== Filmography ==
Feature film

Year	Title	Director	Writer	Producer	Editor	Notes
2014	I Used to Live Here	Yes	Yes	Yes	Yes	
2017	Michael Inside	Yes	Yes	No	No	
2022	Aisha	Yes	Yes	No	No	
2026	The Lost Children of Tuam	Yes	No	No	No	

Documentary film

Year	Title	Director	Writer	Producer	Editor	Notes
2011	Ballymun Lullaby	Yes	—N/a	Yes	Yes	

Short film

Year	Title	Director	Writer	Producer	Editor	Notes
1997	Fanatic	Yes	No	No	No	
1999	Boat Racing	Yes	Yes	Yes	No	
2000	The Black Suit	Yes	No	No	No	
2009	Into the Light: The Making of an Opera	Yes	—N/a			Short documentary
2014	No Road Signs at Sea	No	No	No	Yes	

Television

Year	Title	Director	Writer	Producer	Editor	Notes
2003	This Time Round	Yes	Yes	No	No	TV movie
2006	Teenage Cics	Yes	Yes	No	No	AKA Teenage Kicks. 6-episode Irish-language miniseries co-directed with Audrey O'Reilly.

== Awards and nominations ==
Year	Awards	Category	Film	Result
2011	Directors Finders Series, Ireland	Directors Finders Award	Ballymun Lullaby	Won
2014	Galway Film Fleadh	Best Irish First Feature	I Used to Live Here	Won
2015	Irish Film and Television Awards	Best Film	I Used to Live Here	Nominated
2015	Irish Film and Television Awards	Best Script - Film	I Used to Live Here	Nominated
2017	Galway Film Fleadh	Best Irish Feature Film	Michael Inside	Won
2017	Cork International Film Festival	Audience Award	Michael Inside	Won
2017	Cork International Film Festival	Youth Jury Award	Michael Inside	Nominated
2018	Bali International Film Festival	Best Feature Film	Michael Inside	Won
2018	Irish Film and Television Awards	Best Film	Michael Inside	Won
2018	Irish Film and Television Awards	Best Screenplay - Film	Michael Inside	Nominated
2018	Irish Film and Television Awards	Best Director - Film	Michael Inside	Nominated
2018	Newport Beach Film Festival	Best Director	Michael Inside	Won
2018	Tallinn Black Nights Film Festival	Just Film	Michael Inside	Won
2018	VOICES Festival	Best Director	Michael Inside	Won
2018	Writer's Guild of Ireland Zebbie Awards	Best Feature Film Script	Michael Inside	Won
