= 20th Irish Film & Television Awards =

Film and TV awards presented in 2024

- Date: 20 April 2024
- Site: Dublin Royal Convention Centre
- Hosted by: Baz Ashmawy

Highlights
- Best Film: That They May Face the Rising Sun
- Best Direction: Lisa Mulcahy; Lies We Tell
- Best Actor: Cillian Murphy; Oppenheimer
- Best Actress: Agnes O'Casey; Lies We Tell
- Most awards: Film: Lies We Tell (3); Television: Kin (5)
- Most nominations: Film: Lies We Tell (13); Television: Kin (11)

Television coverage
- Channel: RTÉ

The 20th Irish Film & Television Academy Awards, also called the IFTA Film & Drama Awards 2024 or the 21st Anniversary IFTA Awards, (Note: It was the 20th ceremony, but the 21st anniversary of the awards) took place on 20 April 2024. The ceremony was hosted by Baz Ashmawy at the Dublin Royal Convention Centre. It honoured Irish films and television drama released between 1 January 2023 and 31 December 2023. The nominations were announced on 14 March 2024. The Rising Star nominees were announced on 9 April 2024.

After the nominations were announced, Academy CEO Áine Moriarty said: "What an incredible showcase of nominees shortlisted for Irish Academy Awards this year. Irish talents are proving themselves to be amongst the best in the world, both in front and behind the camera, delivering such high standards of acting, filmmaking, and storytelling. We in the Irish Academy, are proud to showcase this industry's great work and to reward their achievements. Congratulations to all the nominees."

The ceremony was broadcast on RTÉ. Highlights were broadcast on RTÉ2 on 22 April 2024.

== Film ==
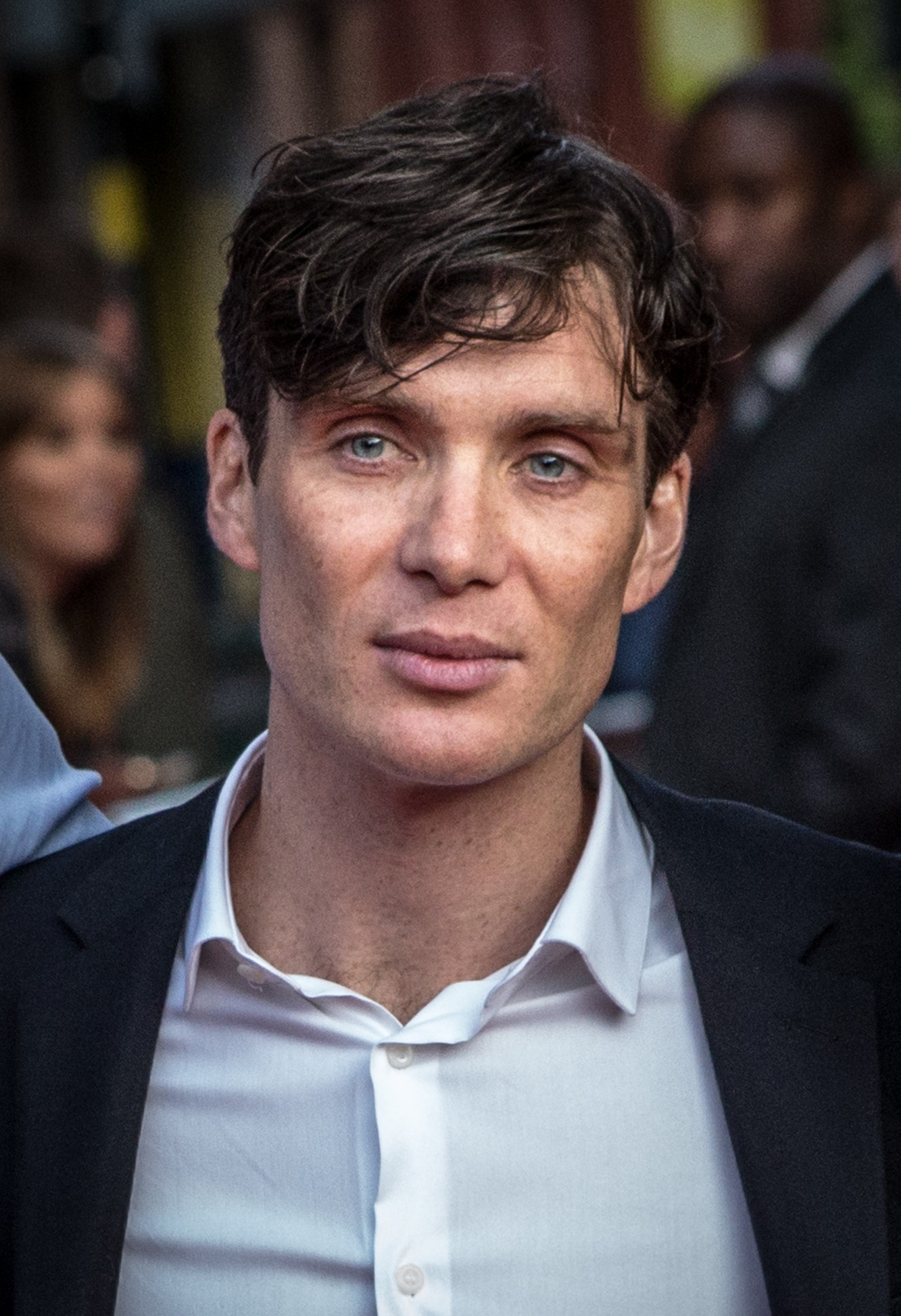
Cillian Murphy, Best Actor in a Lead Role winner

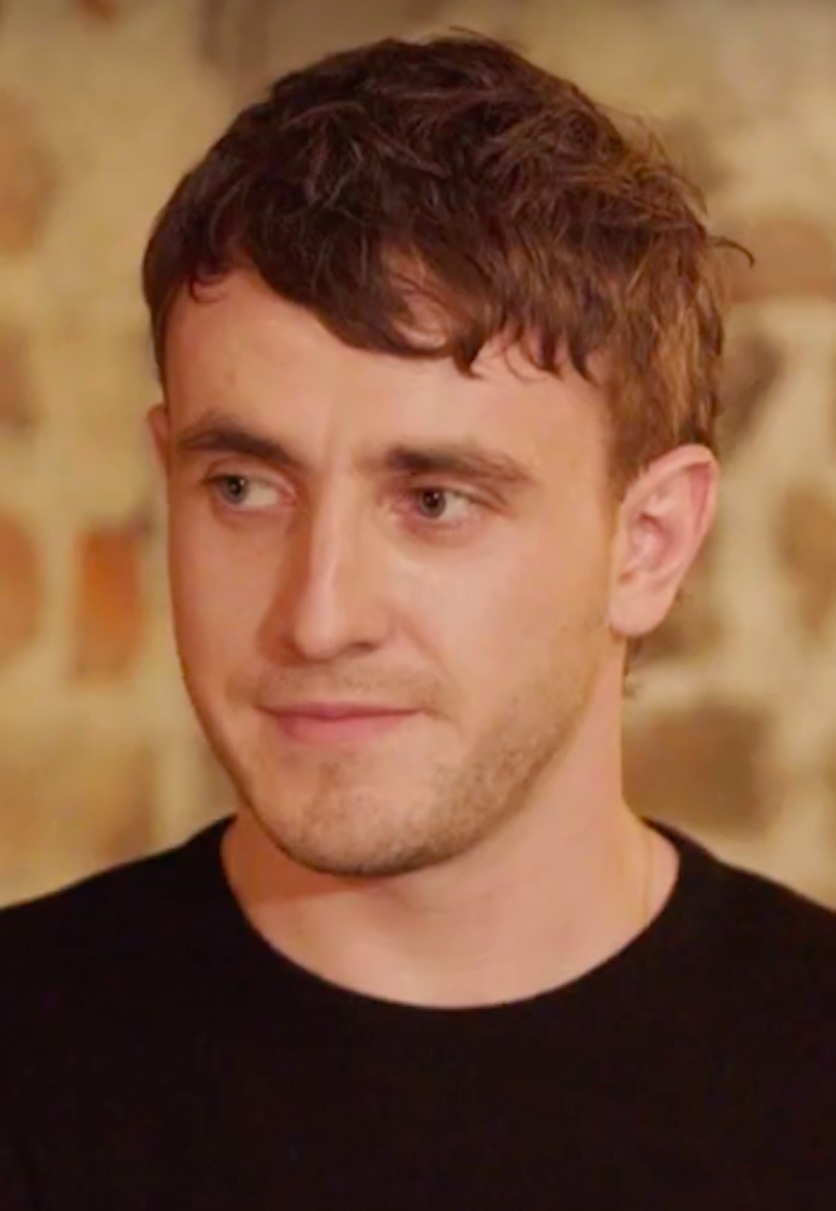
Paul Mescal, Best Actor in a Supporting Role winner

=== Best Film ===
- That They May Face the Rising Sun
  - Double Blind
  - Flora and Son
  - Lies We Tell
  - LOLA
  - Verdigris

=== Best Director ===
- Lisa Mulcahy – Lies We Tell
  - John Carney – Flora and Son
  - Pat Collins – That They May Face the Rising Sun
  - Ian Hunt-Duffy – Double Blind
  - Patricia Kelly – Verdigris
  - Andrew Legge – LOLA

=== Best Script ===
- Elisabeth Gooch – Lies We Tell
  - John Carney – Flora and Son
  - Patricia Kelly – Verdigris
  - Andrew Legge – LOLA
  - Éamon Little – That They May Face the Rising Sun
  - Darach McGarrigle – Double Blind

=== Best Actress in a Lead Role ===
- Agnes O'Casey – Lies We Tell
  - Bríd Brennan – My Sailor, My Love
  - Jessie Buckley – Fingernails
  - Eve Hewson – Flora and Son
  - Geraldine McAlinden – Verdigris
  - Saoirse Ronan – Foe

=== Best Actor in a Lead Role ===
- Cillian Murphy – Oppenheimer
  - Pierce Brosnan – The Last Rifleman
  - Barry Keoghan – Saltburn
  - Andrew Scott – All of Us Strangers
  - Barry Ward – That They May Face the Rising Sun
  - David Wilmot – Lies We Tell

=== Best Actress in a Supporting Role ===
- Alison Oliver – Saltburn
  - Bronagh Gallagher – Dance First
  - Ruth McCabe – That They May Face the Rising Sun
  - Agnes O'Casey – The Miracle Club
  - Maya O'Shea – Verdigris
  - Catherine Walker – My Sailor, My Love

=== Best Actor in a Supporting Role ===
- Paul Mescal – All of Us Strangers
  - Kenneth Branagh – Oppenheimer
  - Liam Carney – Sunlight
  - Diarmuid Noyes – Double Blind
  - Lalor Roddy – That They May Face the Rising Sun
  - Chris Walley – Lies We Tell

=== Best George Morrison Feature Documentary ===
- The Days of Trees
  - The Deepest Breath
  - In the Shadow of Beirut
  - Joan Baez: I Am a Noise
  - Notes from Sheepland
  - Stolen

=== Best Live Action Short ===
- Calf
  - Mud Queen
  - Sound & Colour
  - The Golden West
  - Two for the Road
  - Waiting Day

=== Best Animated Short ===
- Wind & The Shadow
  - Nana Dee
  - The Presenter
  - The Small Makings of a Storm

== Television ==
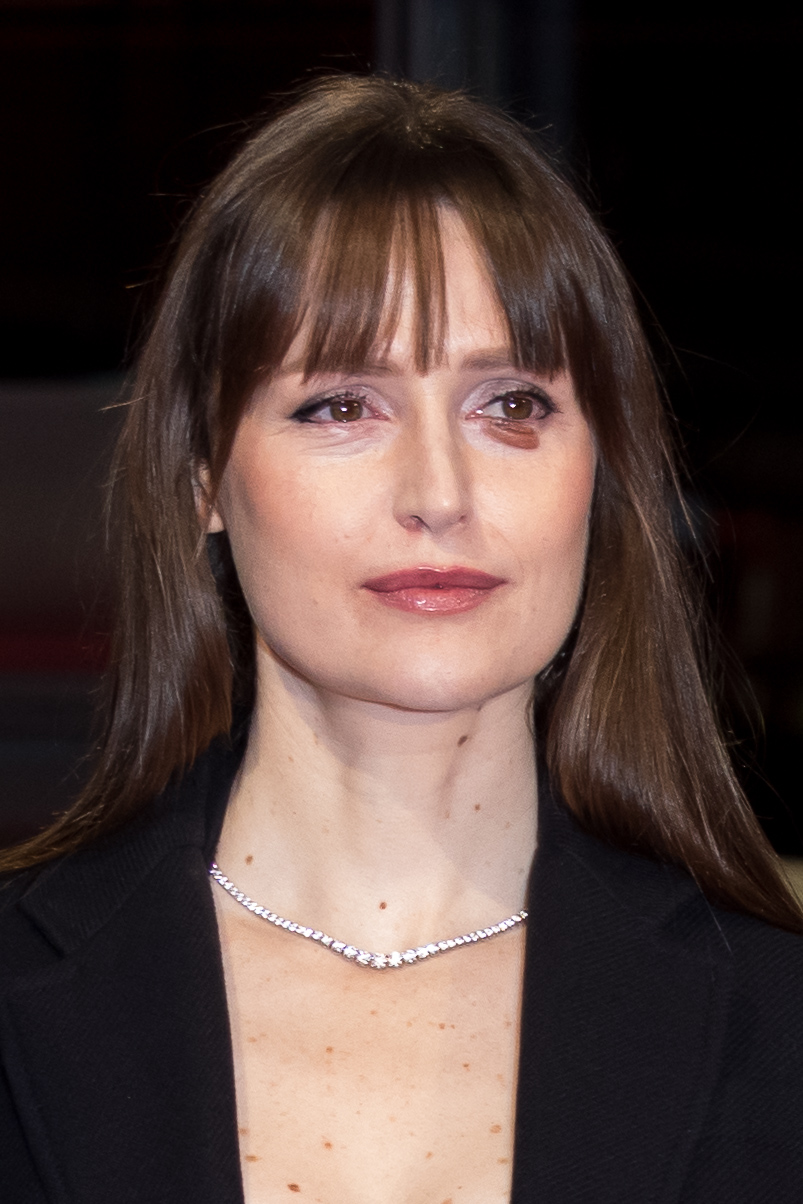
Clare Dunne, Best Actress in a Lead Role winner

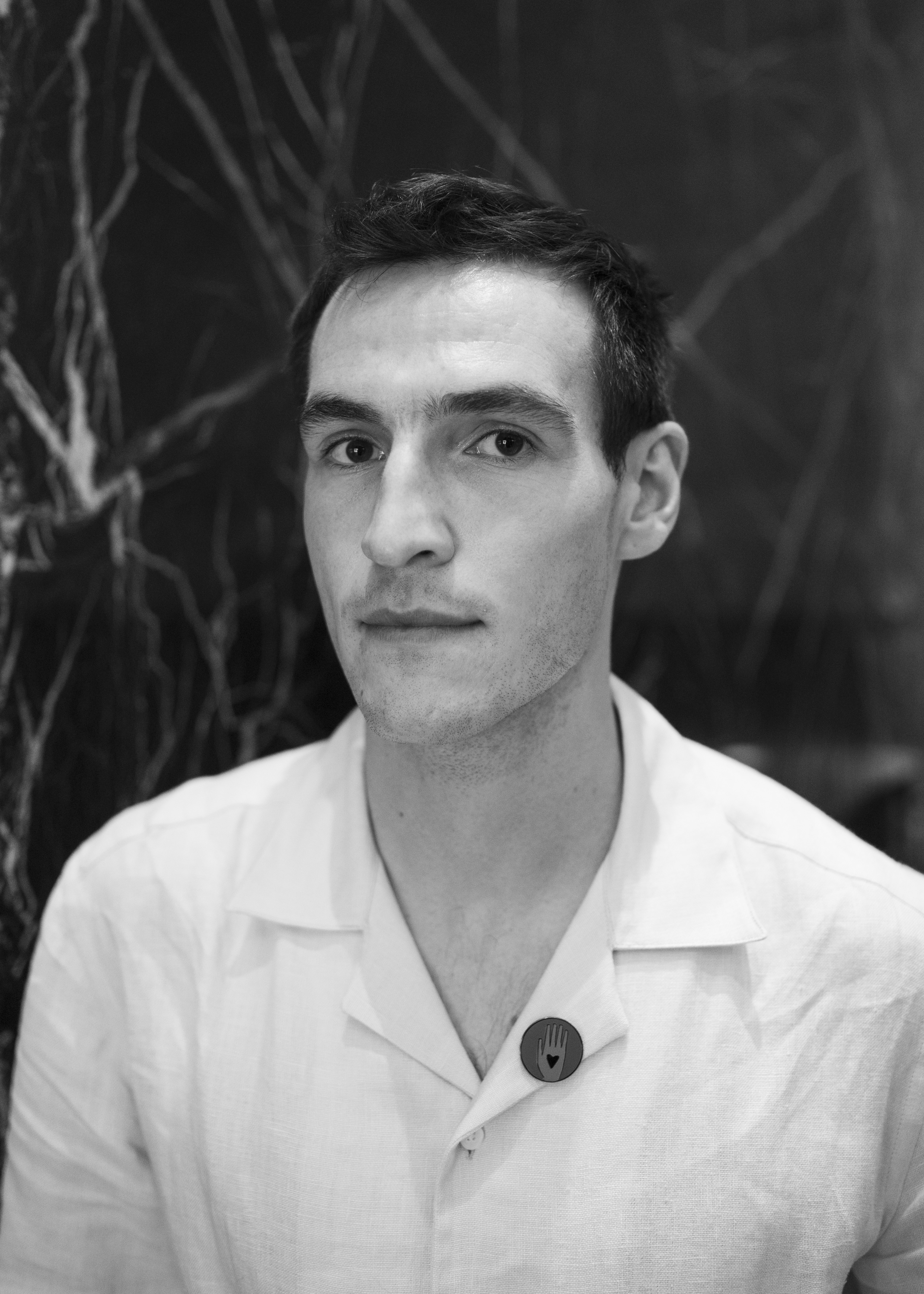
Éanna Hardwicke, Best Actor in a Lead Role winner

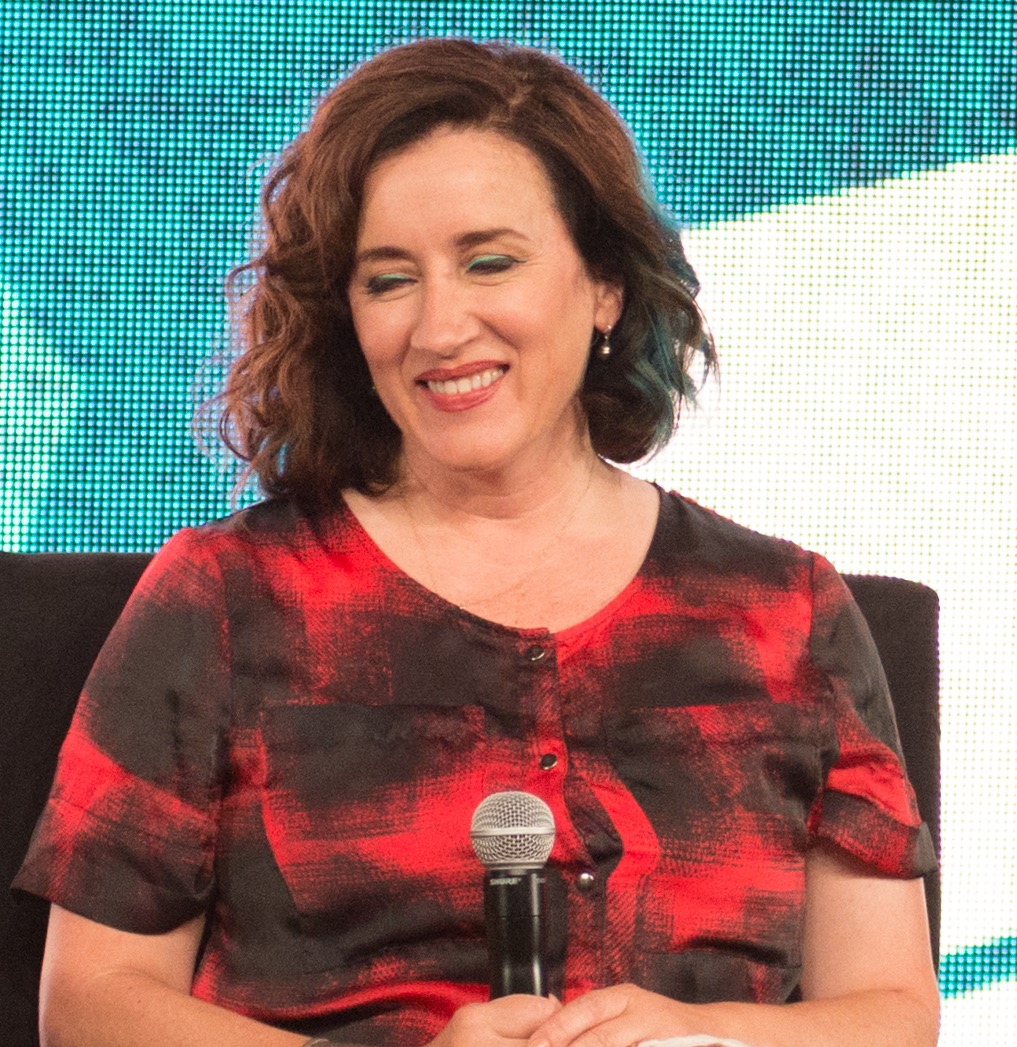
Maria Doyle Kennedy, Best Actress in a Supporting Role winner

=== Best Drama ===
- Kin
  - Blue Lights
  - Hidden Assets
  - Northern Lights
  - Obituary
  - The Woman in the Wall

=== Best Director ===
- Kate Dolan – Kin
  - Joe and Christine Lawlor – Kin
  - Tom Hall – Northern Lights
  - John Hayes – Obituary
  - Fergus O'Brien – Happy Valley
  - Hannah Quinn – The Gone

=== Best Script ===
- Peter McKenna – Kin
  - Stephen Jones – Northern Lights
  - Ray Lawlor – Obituary
  - Declan Lawn and Adam Patterson – Blue Lights
  - Peter McKenna – Hidden Assets
  - Joe Murtagh – The Woman in the Wall

=== Best Actress in a Lead Role ===
- Clare Dunne – Kin
  - Niamh Algar – Malpractice
  - Caitríona Balfe – Outlander
  - Siobhán Cullen – Obituary
  - Sharon Horgan – Best Interests
  - Elva Trill – Northern Lights

=== Best Actor in a Lead Role ===
- Éanna Hardwicke – The Sixth Commandment
  - Sam Keeley – Kin
  - Francis Magee – Kin
  - Martin McCann – Blue Lights
  - Daryl McCormack – The Woman in the Wall
  - Michael Smiley – Obituary

=== Best Actress in a Supporting Role ===
- Maria Doyle Kennedy – Kin
  - Niamh Algar – Culprits
  - Cathy Belton – Hidden Assets
  - Hilda Fay – The Woman in the Wall
  - Fionnula Flanagan – Sisters
  - Danielle Galligan – Obituary

=== Best Actor in a Supporting Role ===
- Richard Dormer – Blue Lights
  - Simon Delaney – The Woman in the Wall
  - Aidan Gillen – Kin
  - Jared Harris – Foundation
  - Aaron Monaghan – Hidden Assets
  - Emmett J. Scanlan – Kin

== Craft ==
=== Best Cinematography ===
- Robbie Ryan – Poor Things
  - Eleanor Bowman – Lies We Tell
  - Richard Kendrick – That They May Face the Rising Sun
  - JJ Rolfe – Kin
  - Narayan Van Maele – Double Blind

=== Best Costume Design ===
- Lara Campbell – LOLA
  - Gwen Jeffares-Hourie – Double Blind
  - Lorna Marie Mugan – The Pope's Exorcist
  - Joanne O'Brien – Lies We Tell
  - Louise Stanton – That They May Face the Rising Sun

=== Best Editing ===
- Michael Harte – Still: A Michael J. Fox Movie
  - Colin Campbell – Double Blind
  - Colin Campbell – LOLA
  - Weronika Kaminska – Lies We Tell
  - John Walters – The Last Rifleman

=== Best Hair & Make-Up ===
- Orla Carroll and Lynn Johnston – The Pope's Exorcist
  - Sandra Dunne and Edwina Kelly – That They May Face the Rising Sun
  - Lyndsey Herron and Barbara Conway – Flora and Son
  - Helen O'Connor and Aitana Silvana – Lies We Tell
  - Jennie Readman and Madonna Bambino – Double Blind

=== Best Original Music ===
- Neil Hannon – LOLA
  - Irene Buckley and Linda Buckley – That They May Face the Rising Sun
  - Gary Clark and John Carney – Flora and Son
  - Die Hexen – Double Blind
  - Aza Hand – Lies We Tell

=== Best Production Design ===
- John Paul Kelly – A Haunting in Venice
  - Caroline Hill – Lies We Tell
  - Steve Kingston – Double Blind
  - Ferdia Murphy – LOLA
  - Padraig O'Neill – That They May Face the Rising Sun

=== Best Sound ===
- Nina Rice – Barbie
  - Garret Farrell, Peter Albrechtsen, and Myk Farmer – Evil Dead Rise
  - Aza Hand, Damien Lynch, and Peter Nicell – Lies We Tell
  - Brendan Rehill, Rob Moore, and Peter Blayney – Double Blind
  - Nina Rice, Nina Hartstone, and Adam Scrivener – Saltburn

=== Best VFX ===
- Kev Cahill and Ben Snow – Dungeons & Dragons: Honor Among Thieves
  - Ed Bruce and Andrew Barry – The Nevers
  - Niall McEvoy and Liam Neville – Paradise
  - Liam Neville and Declan Boyle – Evil Dead Rise

== International ==
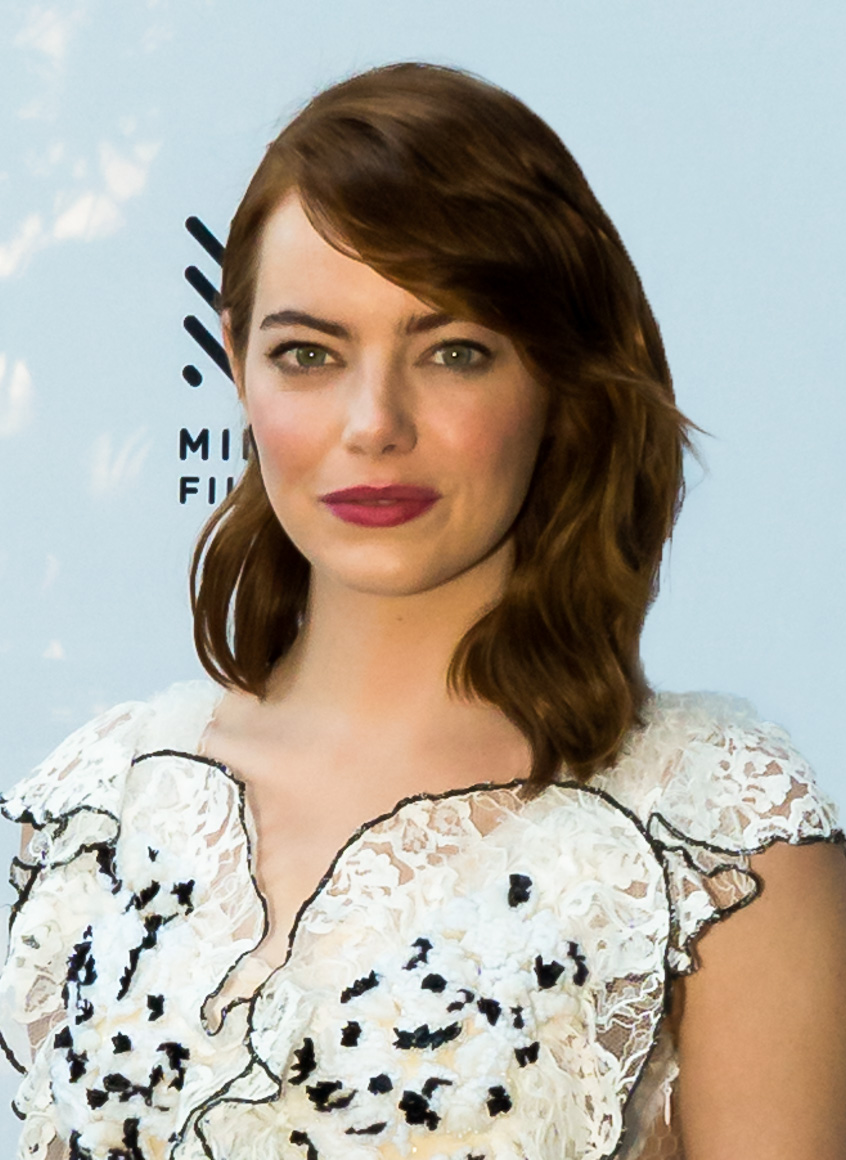
Emma Stone, Best International Actress winner

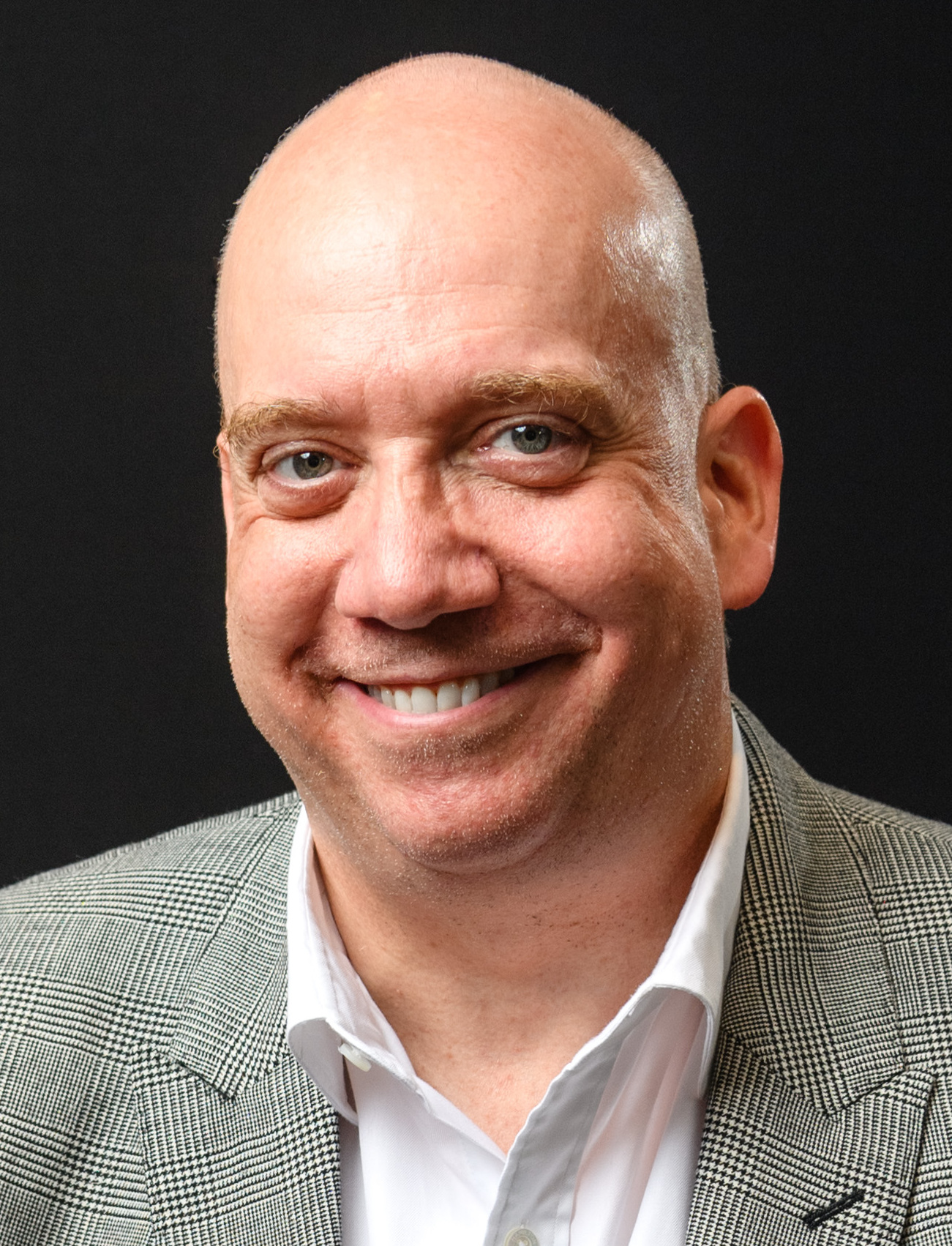
Paul Giamatti, Best International Actor winner

=== Best International Film ===
- Oppenheimer
  - All of Us Strangers
  - Past Lives
  - Poor Things
  - Saltburn
  - The Holdovers

=== Best International Actress ===
- Emma Stone – Poor Things
  - Annette Bening – Nyad
  - Lily Gladstone – Killers of the Flower Moon
  - Greta Lee – Past Lives
  - Carey Mulligan – Maestro
  - Margot Robbie – Barbie

=== Best International Actor ===
- Paul Giamatti – The Holdovers
  - Bradley Cooper – Maestro
  - Willem Dafoe – Poor Things
  - Leonardo DiCaprio – Killers of the Flower Moon
  - Ryan Gosling – Barbie
  - Mark Ruffalo – Poor Things

== Special ==
=== Rising Star ===
- Siobhán Cullen (Actor – Bodkin, The Bright Side, The Dry, Obituary)
  - Kwaku Fortune (Actor – Hidden Assets, Line of Duty, Normal People, TWIG)
  - Ian Hunt-Duffy (Director – Double Blind, Gridlock)
  - Agnes O'Casey (Actor – Lies We Tell, The Miracle Club, Small Things like These)
  - Alison Oliver (Actor – Conversations with Friends, Saltburn, Sound & Colour)

=== Irish Academy Award for Lifetime Achievement ===
- Stephen Rea (for his outstanding contribution to the Irish and international screen industry)

== See also ==
- 2023 in Irish television
- 77th British Academy Film Awards
- 2024 British Academy Television Awards
