= Joanne Crawford =

Irish actress

- Born: Derry, Northern Ireland
- Occupation: Actress
- Television: Blue Lights

Joanne Crawford is an actress from Northern Ireland who has appeared on stage, film and television. She is known for her role in the BBC One series Blue Lights.

== Career ==
Crawford, who is from Derry, played a solicitor in a small role in the Jed Mercurio series Line of Duty. She also had roles in television series The Fall and Chosen, as well as films including Ballywalter and To All My Darlings.

She has a role as policewoman Helen McNally in BBC One 2023 police drama Blue Lights, reprising the role for the 2024 second series. In 2025, she was confirmed as returning for the third series of the drama.

In 2023, she filmed the independent film The Wise Guy alongside Darrell D'Silva. She had a role in 2024 BBC television drama Dead and Buried. She also appeared in Cillian Murphy 2024 film Small Things like These.

In 2025, she appeared at the Lyric Theatre, Belfast in the Marie Jones stage play Dear Arabella, alongside Jayne Wisener among others.

Crawford has an upcoming role in BBC Northern Ireland sitcom Rewarding, appearing alongside Blue Lights co-star Hannah McClean and comedian Vittorio Angelone, and expected to be broadcast in 2026.

== Partial filmography ==
Year	Title	Role	Notes
2013–2016	The Fall	Joan Jennings	
2016	Line of Duty	Fairbank's solicitor	2 episodes
2023–present	Blue Lights	Helen McNally	Recurring role
2024	Small Things like These	Norma Sinnott	
2024	Dead and Buried	Dr. Kennedy	4 episodes
