= Ballywalter (film) =

2022 Northern Irish film

- Theatrical film poster
- Directed by: Prasanna Puwanarajah
- Written by: Stacey Gregg
- Produced by: James Bierman; Nik Bower
- Starring: Seána Kerslake; Patrick Kielty; Joanne Crawford; Conor MacNeill; Carol Moore
- Cinematography: Federico Cesca
- Edited by: Sarah Brewerton; Mark Towns
- Music by: Niall Lawlor
- Release dates: November 3, 2022 (Belfast); November 16, 2022 (Cork); September 22, 2023 (UK)
- Running time: 90 mins.
- Country: United Kingdom
- Language: English

Ballywalter is a 2022 Northern Irish drama film, directed by Prasanna Puwanarajah and written by Stacey Gregg. It stars Seána Kerslake, Patrick Kielty, Joanne Crawford, Conor MacNeill, and Carol Moore. It premiered at the Belfast Film Festival, and shortly thereafter the Cork International Film Festival in 2022. It later premiered in Ireland in 2023.

== Synopsis ==
Bittersweet comedy-drama set in Ballywalter, Northern Ireland.

== Cast ==
- Seána Kerslake as Eileen
- Patrick Kielty as Shane
- Joanne Crawford as Donna
- Conor MacNeill as Short
- Carol Moore as Bess
- Ryan McParland as Pizza Phil
- Lloyd Hutchinson as Jonny
- Chris Corrigan as Fergal

== Reception ==
On the review aggregator website Rotten Tomatoes, 100% of 10 critics' reviews are positive, with an average rating of 6.70/10.

Ryan Gilbey of The Guardian gave the film 3/5 stars, praising the performances of Patrick Kielty and especially Seána Kerslake, calling her characterization "prickly, unsentimental, and true". Mansel Stimpson of Film Review Daily gave it 3.5/5 stars, and stated that they "performed so well together". Chris Wasser of the Irish Independent also praised the actors, calling Kielty "a revelation" and Kerslake "exemplary". Harry Guerin of RTÉ gave it 4/5 stars, remarking on the "excellent chemistry" between the two leads.

Brian Bowe of Sight & Sound complimented Stacey Gregg's "funny script", saying it's "far more concerned with what connects rather than divides us". Nikki Baughan of Screen Daily lauded director Prasanna Puwanarajah for a "well-observed debut", and also felt the screenplay "leaned into dark comedy rather than melodrama". Kat Halstead of Common Sense Media also cited the "darkly humorous, undeniably emotive, yet never melodramatic or showy" screenplay. Gareth O'Connor of Movies.ie rated it 4/5 stars and stated, "As first features go, this is impressively mature filmmaking".

Emma Simmonds of Radio Times said Puwanarajah and Gregg "treat the sensitive subject with the care it deserves". Edward Porter of The Times said "The script is rather forced but reaches a well-judged ending". Rich Cline of Shadows on the Wall gave it 3.5/5 stars, commenting on "the vivid sense of the internal fire within people". And Alexa Dalby of Dog and Wolf lauded the "lovely blues guitar" score by Niall Lawlor.
