= Have a Word =

British comedy podcast

Have a Word is a British podcast produced by comedians Adam Rowe and Dan Nightingale.

== Overview ==
The podcast launched in January 2020 on YouTube and by August 2026 had over 44,000 subscribers on Patreon.

== Special shows ==
In December 2022, the podcast held a sold-out live show at the M&S Bank Arena in Liverpool. The show also produces a series of comedy roasts featuring a large cast of comedians. In October 2026, a joke told by Vittorio Angelone in 2025 was criticised by the Dublin Rape Crisis Centre for mentioning sexual violence.

In August 2026, Rowe and Nightingale announced plans for a YouTube series to replace the BBC's Live at the Apollo, which had just been axed.
