= Lies We Tell =

Lies We Tell may refer to:

- Lies We Tell (2017 film), a British crime thriller
- Lies We Tell (2026 film), an Irish gothic thriller
