= Nathan Braniff =

Northern Irish actor

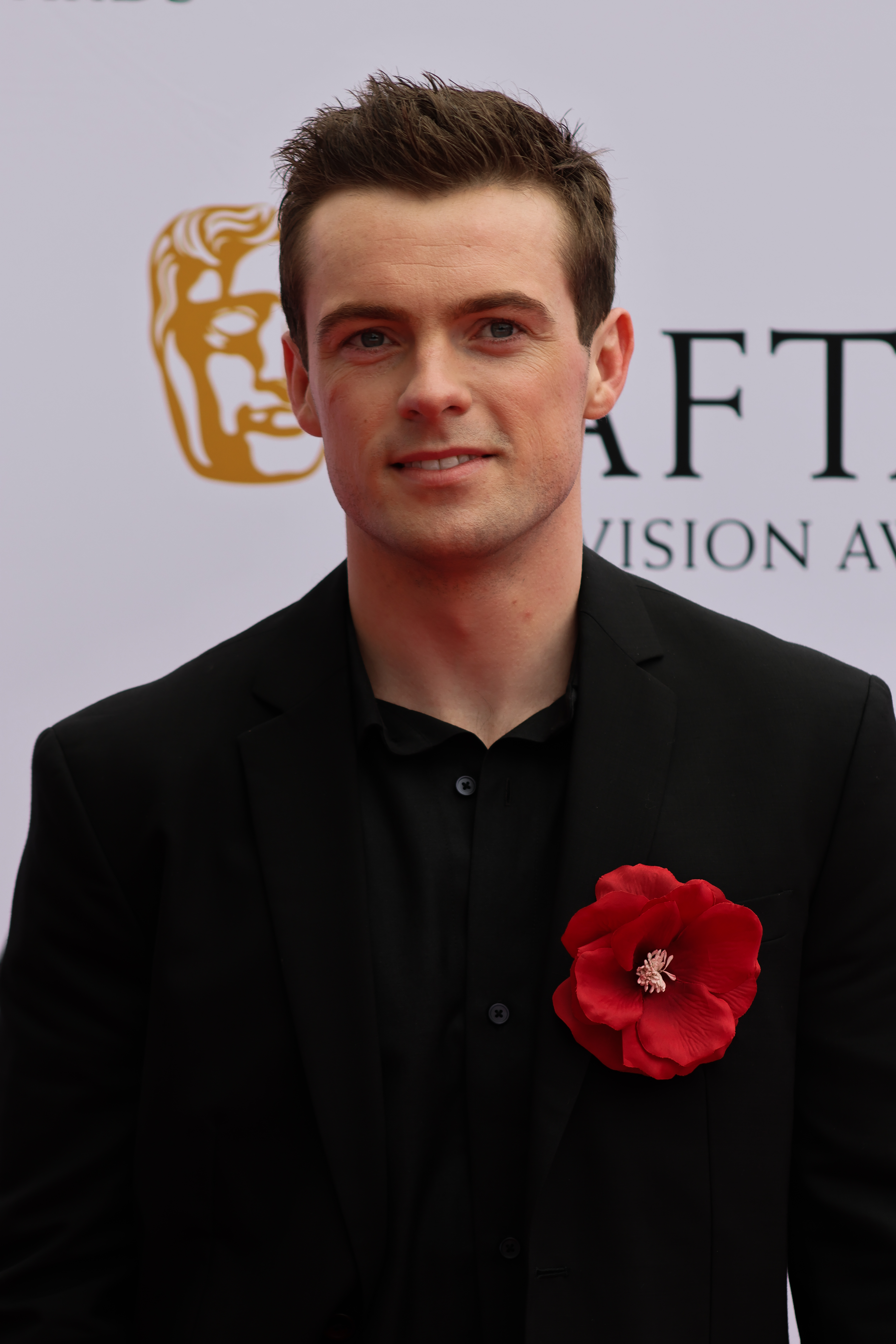
- Braniff at the 2026 British Academy Television Awards
- Born: 1997 (age 28–29)
- Education: Italia Conti Academy of Theatre Arts
- Years active: 2011–present
- Television: Blue Lights

Nathan Braniff (born 1997) is a Northern Irish stage and television actor from Belfast. He is best known for playing police officer Tommy Foster in the BBC One drama series Blue Lights (2023–present).

== Early life ==
Braniff grew up in Belfast, where his parents ran a fish-and-chip shop. He developed an interest in acting as a child and performed in school productions before auditioning for theatre roles. He attended Campbell College, Belfast, and at 18 moved to London to study acting at the Italia Conti Academy of Theatre Arts.

== Career ==
=== Stage ===
As a teenager, Braniff played the title role in a 2011 production of Bugsy Malone at the Grand Opera House, Belfast. He later appeared in a production of Honk! at the same venue. While studying at Italia Conti, Braniff appeared in a 2018 production of Tipping the Velvet, adapted from Sarah Waters's novel. In October 2025, Braniff returned to the stage in Instructions, an interactive theatrical production by Subject Object, performing at the Lyric Theatre, Belfast as part of the Belfast International Arts Festival.

=== Television ===
After seven years in London, he was cast as probationary police officer Tommy Foster in the BBC police drama Blue Lights, his first professional television role, and returned to Belfast for the production. For the role, Braniff studied police behavior and later attended police training with other cast members. During the first series, he played a rookie mentored by veteran officer Gerry Cliff, played by Richard Dormer. Their on-screen relationship carried over into an off-screen friendship, and Dormer's mentorship influenced Braniff as a less experienced actor.

Braniff continued as Foster in the second and third series. The second series won the 2025 British Academy Television Award for Best Drama Series. While filming the third series, Vogue accompanied Braniff, co-star Katherine Devlin and the series' police adviser on a tour of Belfast as part of a feature on the production.

Braniff returned as Foster for the fourth series of Blue Lights, which premiered on BBC One and BBC iPlayer on 29 September 2026. The fourth season again follows Foster, Grace Ellis and Annie Conlon three years into their careers as police officers.

== Personal life ==
Braniff competes in kickboxing and Brazilian jiu-jitsu. His younger brothers are competitive kickboxers, and the four brothers have competed on the same fight card in what the Irish Times described as "history making".

In December 2025, Braniff became an ambassador for Northern Ireland Hospice, supporting its fundraising and public-awareness work.

== Filmography ==
Year	Title	Role	Notes
2023–present	Blue Lights	Tommy Foster	Main role
