= Danny Nightingale =

Danny Nightingale may refer to:

- Danny Nightingale (pentathlete)
- Danny Nightingale (British Army soldier)
- Dan Nightingale (born 1981), English stand-up comedian and podcaster
