= Lauren-Shannon Jones =

Irish playwright and performer

- Born: c. 1989
- Education: MFA
- Alma mater: Trinity College Dublin

Lauren-Shannon Jones (born c. 1989) is an Irish playwright and performer.

== Biography ==
Jones began her media career working as a model before going on to graduate with an honours degree in film production from Colaiste Dhulaigh in Coolock and Wolverhampton College. She then completed an MFA in Playwriting in 2018 through Trinity College Dublin's Lir National Academy of Dramatic Art.

She is a writer of stories, screenplays and scripts as well as a performer in theatre. She is known for her horror stories including an anthology show Mother Stoker's Sickly Stories in The Bram Stoker Festival in 2016 and Fetch as part of 2019 Dublin Fringe Festival. Jones is a member of the Screen Directors Guild of Ireland as well as the Irish Playwrights and Screenwriters Guild.

Jones has also written for The Irish Times on mental health.

== Playography ==
- Grow, 2013
- The Assassination of Brian Boru, 2014
- Olympia, 2015
- Pink Milk, 2016
- Viva Voce, 2018
- FETCH, 2019
