= Bad Blood (British TV series) =

British television series

- Screenplay by: Peter Moffat
- Directed by: Julia Ford
- Country of origin: United Kingdom
- Original language: English
- No. of series: 1

Production
- Executive producers: Simon Heath; Joe Williams; Annabel Jones; Julia Ford; Peter Moffat
- Producer: Abi Bach
- Production companies: ITV Studios; World Productions

Original release
- Network: ITVX

Bad Blood is an upcoming British television series for ITVX written by Peter Moffat about the so-called British contaminated blood scandal. The cast includes Iain Glen, Ben Chaplin, Susan Lynch, Luke Treadaway, Hannah McClean and Joe Absolom.

== Premise ==
Pupils at a school for disabled children and young people are given an imported treatment for haemophilia contaminated with HIV and hepatitis.

== Cast ==
- Iain Glen
- Ben Chaplin
- Susan Lynch
- Luke Treadaway
- Hannah McClean
- Joe Absolom
- Patrick Fabian
- Precious Wura Alabi
- Ron Cook
- Peter Sullivan
- Cal MacAninch

== Production ==
In February 2024, it was reported that British screenwriter Peter Moffat was writing a drama series about the contaminated blood scandal for ITV. A British Infected Blood Inquiry published in 2022 estimated that around 1,250 people with bleeding disorders, such as haemophilia, were infected with HIV in the UK, with at least a further 2,400 infected with Hepatitis C after receiving contaminated clotting factor products. Some reports suggest that between the 1970s and early 1990s an estimated 30,000 people in the UK were given infected blood transfusions. Moffat was quoted as saying:

"The victims of this scandal have been let down again and again by the state – I hope in some small way this drama can help their voices be heard.”

In January 2026, it was commissioned under the title Bad Blood. The series is directed by Julia Ford, and produced by Ali Bach. The executive producers on the series include Moffat, Ford, Simon Heath, Joe Williams and Annabel Jones. The series is produced by World Productions.

In September 2026, the cast was announced to include Iain Glen, Ben Chaplin, Susan Lynch, Luke Treadaway, Hannah McClean, Patrick Fabian, Precious Wura Alabi, Joe Absolom, Ron Cook, Peter Sullivan and Cal MacAninch. Filming had started by September 2026. Filming locations include the north east of England.
