= A Greyhound of a Girl =

European animated film

- English-language theatrical release poster
- Directed by: Enzo D'Alò
- Screenplay by: Enzo D'Alò; Dave Ingham
- Based on: A Greyhound of a Girl by Roddy Doyle (2011)
- Produced by: Mark Cumberton; Richard Gordon; Adrien Chef; Paul Thiltges; Xenia Douglas; Vilnis Kalnaellis; Riina Sildos; Artur Kubiczek
- Starring: Brendan Gleeson; Sharon Horgan; Mia O'Connor; Charlene McKenna; Rosaleen Linehan
- Music by: David Rhodes
- Production companies: JAM Media; Paul Thiltges Distributions; Aliante; Rija Films; Amrion Production; Fish Blowing Bubbles
- Distributed by: Der Filmverleih (Germany); Dazzler Media (Ireland and United Kingdom); BIM Distribuzione (Italy)
- Release dates: 18 February 2023 (Berlin Film Festival); 23 November 2023 (Italy)
- Running time: 85 minutes
- Countries: Estonia; Germany; Ireland; Italy; Latvia; Luxembourg; United Kingdom
- Language: English

A Greyhound of a Girl is a 2023 animated drama film directed by Italian animator Enzo D'Alò and co-produced between seven European countries. It is an adaptation by D'Alò and Dave Ingham of the 2011 novel of the same name by Roddy Doyle. It has a voice cast that includes Sharon Horgan and Brendan Gleeson. It premiered at the Berlin Film Festival in February 2023.

== Synopsis ==
Mary is an eleven-year-old girl with a passion for cooking, absorbing information from her grandmother who is a wonderful cook. However, Mary and her family must come to terms with her grandmother's illness.

== Cast ==
- Mia O'Connor as Mary
- Sharon Horgan as Scarlett
- Brendan Gleeson as Paddy
- Rosaleen Linehan as Emer
- Charlene McKenna as Tansey
- Vanessa Emme as Dr. Heaney

== Production ==
An adaptation by Dave Ingham and D'Alò from the 2011 novel by Roddy Doyle, design is by Peter De Sève The project has been produced across seven European countries (Estonia, Germany, Ireland, Italy, Latvia, Luxembourg and the United Kingdom) by Paul Thiltges Distributions, Aliante, JAM Media, Rija Films, Amrion Production, Fish Blowing Bubbles.

== Release ==
The film was screened at the 73rd Berlin International Film Festival in February 2023 as part of the Generation Kplus 2023 programme.

== Reception ==
On the review aggregator website Rotten Tomatoes, A Greyhound of a Girl holds an approval rating of 86% from 7 reviews.

Cath Clarke in The Guardian called it "a gorgeous family animation with a big heart, charming without being too sugary" and said it was "a gentle introduction to death" with the message that "when someone dear to us dies, what we are left with is their love, and what they have shown us about how to love".
