= Double Blind (film) =

- Directed by: Ian Hunt Duffy
- Written by: Darach McGarrigle
- Produced by: Simon Doyle
- Starring: Millie Brady; Pollyanna McIntosh; Akshay Kumar; Diarmuid Noyes; Brenock O'Connor; Abby Fitz; Shonagh Marie; Frank Blake
- Cinematography: Narayan Van Maele
- Edited by: Colin Campbell
- Music by: Die Hexen
- Production companies: Epic Pictures; Fail Safe Films
- Release date: 1 July 2023
- Running time: 90 minutes
- Country: Ireland

Double Blind is a 2023 Irish horror film, directed by Ian Hunt Duffy and starring Millie Brady and Polyanna McIntosh.

== Plot ==
When an experimental drug trial goes horribly wrong, seven young test subjects, after being kept awake for days, must face the terrifying side effect of the drug: if you fall asleep, you die. Trapped in an isolated medical facility, they desperately try to find a way to reverse the side effects of the trial, as one by one they succumb to sleep and death.

Panic quickly takes hold and they begin to turn on each other. It's left up to Claire, the group's unlikely leader, to keep them together, find a way to escape, and somehow manage to stay awake.

== Cast ==
- Millie Brady as Claire
- Pollyanna McIntosh as Dr. Burke
- Akshay Kumar as Amir Sardar
- Diarmuid Noyes as Ray
- Brenock O'Connor as Paul
- Abby Fitz as Alison
- Shonagh Marie as Vanessa
- Frank Blake as Marcus

== Production ==
Double Blind was shot in Limerick, Ireland in April 2022.

== Release ==
The film had its international premiere at the Neuchatel International Fantastic Film Festival. The film then had its Irish premiere at the Galway Film Fleadh, followed by screenings at the Newport Beach Film Festival and Leeds International Film Festival.

The film was released in Irish and US cinemas in February 2024.

== Reception ==
On Rotten Tomatoes, the film holds an approval rating of 100%, based on 10 reviews. The film was nominated for 11 awards, including Best Film, at the 20th Irish Film and Television Awards.
