= Mike Rice (comedian) =

Irish comedian

- Born: Michael Rice; 22 February 1991 (age 35); Kilkenny, Ireland
- Education: St Kieran’s College
- Occupations: Comedian, podcaster
- Known for: Mike & Vittorio's Guide to Parenting; A Comedy Thing on Channel 4 with Vittorio Angelone, Finlay Christie, Olga Koch, Micky Overman, Dan Tiernan, and Gbemi Oladipo

Mike Rice is an Irish comedian and podcaster.

== Early life ==
Rice was born in Greenridge, Kilkenny. Before going into comedy, Rice worked as an accountant.

== Career ==
Since 2023, Rice has co-hosted the podcast Mike and Vittorio's Guide to Parenting with Vittorio Angelone. In 2025, Rice was revealed as one of the comedians leading Channel 4's online comedy output on YouTube titled A Comedy Thing. A Comedy Thing was renewed in 2026 and released on Spotify in addition to YouTube.

== Personal life ==
Rice has lived in Chicago, Berlin, and Barcelona.

== Awards ==
Year	Award	Category	Result
2025	Chortle awards	Best Headliner	Nominated
2024	Comedians' choice awards	Best Show	Nominated
