= Katherine Devlin =

Northern Irish actress

- Born: County Tyrone, Northern Ireland
- Education: Royal Welsh College of Music & Drama
- Occupation: Actress
- Television: Blue Lights

Katherine Devlin is an actress from Northern Ireland. She is known for her role in the BBC One series Blue Lights (2023).

== Early life ==
Devlin was born in Cookstown, and grew up in County Tyrone. Her father is a civil engineer, and her mother is an artist. Devlin attended a sixth form college in Donaghmore. She received offers to study psychology at university, but turned them down to pursue drama instead. She took a foundation course at The Lir Academy in Dublin and went on to graduate from the Royal Welsh College of Music & Drama in 2021.

== Career ==
Devlin appeared as Siobhan in the 2019 Ulster western film The Dig. She appeared as Natasha in an episode of Vikings.

In 2023, Devlin began portraying Constable Annie Conlon, a rookie police officer in the Belfast-set BBC One series Blue Lights. Devlin has spoken about the series displaying the intricate nature of the history and politics of Northern Ireland to a wider audience. Blue Lights was renewed for a second series, airing April 2024. It was renewed for a third and fourth series in 2024. In January 2026, she was nominated at the IFTA Film & Drama Awards for best supporting actress.

== Filmography ==
| Year | Title | Role | Notes |
|---|---|---|---|
| 2019 | The Dig | Siobhan | Film |
| 2020 | Vikings | Natasha | 1 episode |
| 2023–present | Blue Lights | Annie | Main role |
| 2024 | The Day of the Jackal | Emma Stoke | 1 episode |
