= Rewarding (TV series) =

Northern Irish television comedy series

- Written by: Matthew McDevitt; Paddy Campbell; Faebian Averies
- Directed by: David Moody
- Starring: Hannah McClean; Vittorio Angelone; Joanne Crawford
- Country of origin: United Kingdom
- Original language: English
- No. of series: 1
- No. of episodes: 6

Production
- Executive producers: Jason Butler; Kim Varvell; Tommy Bulfin; Justin Rosenblatt; Tristen Tuckfield
- Running time: 28 minutes
- Production companies: Conker Pictures; BBC Northern Ireland; Wonder Project

Original release
- Network: BBC One Northern Ireland
- Release: 13 November 2026 – present

Rewarding is a 2026 Northern Irish comedy television series set in the world of domiciliary care, starring Hannah McClean, Joanne Crawford and Vittorio Angelone. The six-part series is broadcast on BBC Northern Ireland on 13 November 2026.

== Premise ==
Set within a domiciliary care setting in Belfast, the series examines the lives of both support staff and the neurodivergent people they care for.

== Cast ==
- Hannah McClean as Sinead
- Vittorio Angelone as Francis
- Joanne Crawford as Nicola
- Bernadette Brown as Fidelma
- Faolan Morgan as Cyril
- Lee Snodgrass as Cal
- Faith Alabi as Martina
- John Moffat as Joe

== Production ==
The series is written by Matthew McDevitt with Paddy Campbell and Faebian Averies. The series is supported by Northern Ireland Screen and developed from a pilot episode made for BBC Northern Ireland and Northern Ireland Screen's Green Lit scheme. It is directed by David Moody. It is produced by Conker Pictures with executive producers including Kim Varvell and Tommy Bulfin for Conker Pictures alongside Jason Butler for BBC Northern Ireland, and Justin Rosenblatt and Tristen Tuckfield for Wonder Project.

The cast is led by Hannah McClean, Vittorio Angelone, Joanne Crawford, Bernadette Brown and Faolan Morgan. Filming took place in Northern Ireland in July 2026. First-look images from filming were released to the media in October 2026. Shortly after, Angelone received public backlash surrounding a rape and incest joke made in 2025, resulting in a BBC spokesperson commenting ahead of his appearance on the sitcom 'we are aware of the concerns that have been raised and are actively considering them'.

== Broadcast ==
The six-part series broadcast on BBC Northern Ireland and BBC iPlayer from 13 November 2026.
