= Vanessa Emme =

Irish actress

- Education: The Lir Academy
- Occupation: Actress
- Years active: 2010–present
- Television: The Chelsea Detective

Vanessa Emme is an Irish stage and television actress. Her television roles include Layla Walsh in British police drama The Chelsea Detective (2023–present).

== Early and personal life ==
Emme is of Filipino descent through her mother, who graduated from university in the Philippines before moving abroad to teach. Emme told The Irish Examiner in 2018 that she is distantly related to Filipina freedom fighter Marcela Marcelo who led a group of revolutionaries against the Spanish.

Emme graduated from The Lir Academy in 2014 with a Bachelor in Acting. She moved from Ireland to be based in London in the late 2010s.

== Career ==
=== Stage ===
In 2015, she appeared on stage in an adaptation of Brian Friel's Dancing at Lughnasa at the Gaiety Theatre, Dublin.

In 2017, she appeared in Mosquitoes at the National Theatre in London alongside Olivia Colman and Olivia Williams.

In 2018, she appeared in an adaptation of John Osbourne's Look Back in Anger at the Gate Theatre in Dublin.

=== Film and television ===
She appeared in Dublin Murders and Bloodlands. She also appeared in A Discovery of Witches in 2022, as well as a role in long-running British procedural crime series Midsomer Murders.

She has a voice role in the animated film A Greyhound of a Girl adapted from the book by Irish author Roddy Doyle.

She has a lead role alongside Adrian Scarborough in series two thru four of The Chelsea Detective as no-nonsense police detective Layla Walsh from 2023, broadcast on Acorn TV. In March 2025, it was confirmed that her character would be returning for the third season of the show with filming completed ahead of an April 2025 broadcast.

== Filmography ==
=== Film ===
Year	Title	Role	Notes	Ref.
2008	Boyfriend Trouble	Cathy	Short film (Credited as Vanessa Fahy)	
2008	Intersection Number Nine	Number Six	(Credited as Vanessa Fahy)	
2008	Ghostwood	Elizabeth	(Credited as Vanessa Fahy)	
2011	Every Second Sunday	Amanda	Short film (Credited as Vanessa Fahy)	
2012	The Inside	Louise	(Credited as Vanessa Matisa Fahy)	
2013	The Anti Love Pill	Wendy	Short film (Credited as Vanessa Matias Fahy)	
2014	The Shadows	Female Shadow	(Credited as Vanessa Matias Fahy)	
2017	The Observer Effect	Maeve	Short film	
2023	A Greyhound of a Girl	Dr. Heaney (voice)		

=== Television ===
Year	Title	Role	Notes	Ref.
2010	Mariana	Sandra	Episode: "Mariana and Her Sisters" (Credited as Vanessa Fahy)	
2016	The Fall	Dr. Doyle	Episode: "Silence and Suffering"	
2017	Little Boy Blue	Police Liaison Officer	Miniseries; 2 episodes	
2018	Holby City	Rochelle Plympton	Episode: "All Lies Lead to the Truth"	
2019	Manhunt	Vanessa	Episode: "The First Day"	
2019	Dublin Murders	Abby Stone	Miniseries; 4 episodes	
2020	Doctors	Ruth Garrod	Episode: "New Follower"	
2021	Three Families	Rachel Donleavy	Miniseries; 2 episodes	
2021	Midsomer Murders	Danni Karras	Episode: "Happy Families"	
2022	A Discovery of Witches	Joy Connelly	Episode: "Series 3, Episode 2"	
2022	Bloodlands	Leah Hardy	Recurring role; 3 episodes	
2023–present	The Chelsea Detective	DS Layla Walsh	Series regular; 10 episodes	
2025	Lynley	Donne Rathmell	Episode: "Careless in Red"	
