= Danielle Ryan =

Irish-Sri Lankan Heiress (born 1983)

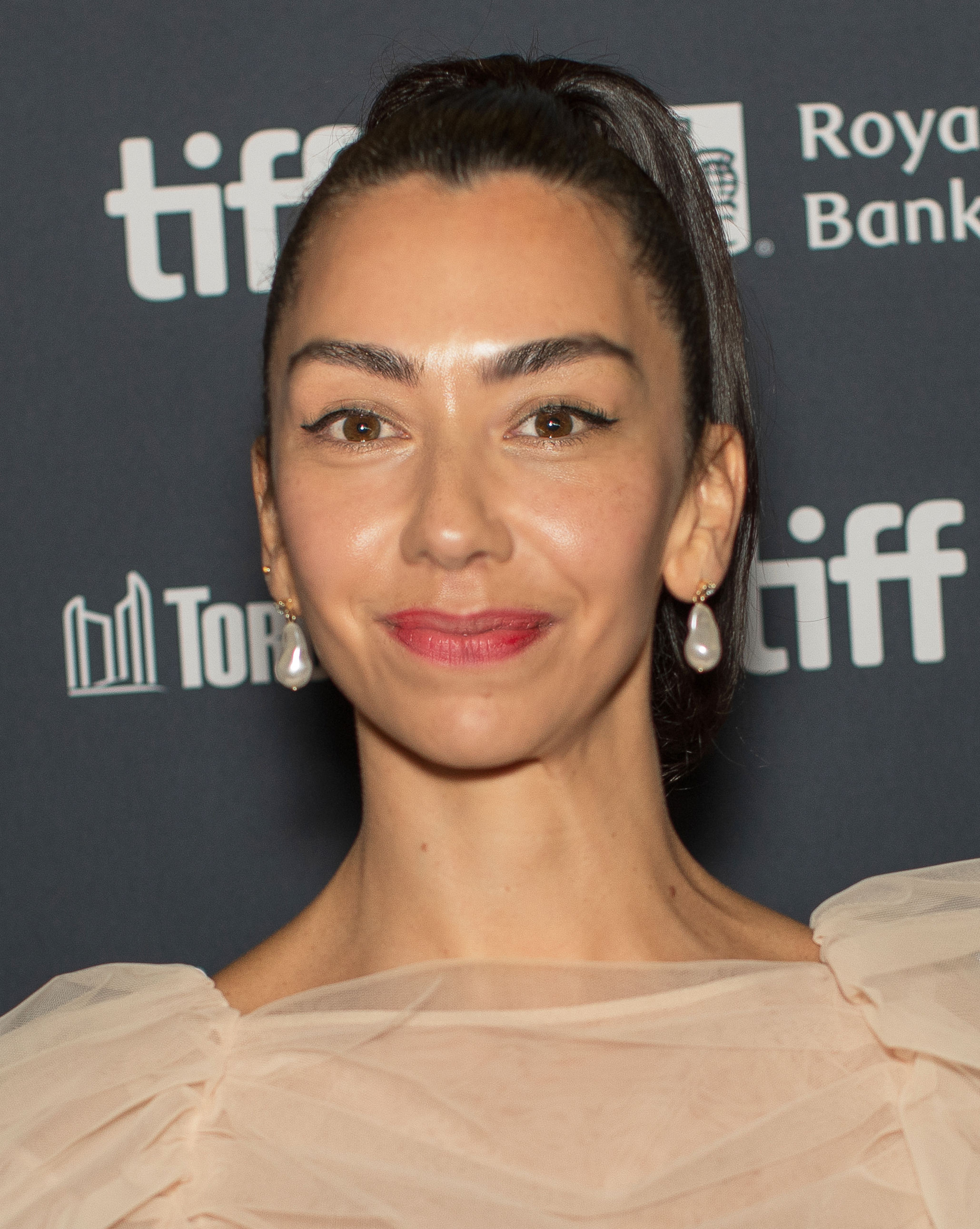
- Ryan in 2024
- Born: 1 November 1983 (age 43); Dublin, Ireland
- Occupations: Actress, entrepreneur
- Years active: 2006–present

Danielle Ryan is an Irish-Sri-Lankan heiress, being the daughter of Capt. Cathal Ryan and granddaughter of Tony Ryan, founder of Ryanair. Her mother Tess de Kretser, is from Sri Lanka. She trained in acting at the Royal Academy of Dramatic Art (RADA) in London. Thus far, Ryan has used her inherited €250 million fortune to try her hand at being a business woman, entrepreneur, philanthropist, actress and producer.

Ryan married a nephew of former President of Ireland Mary Robinson, Barrister Richard Bourke, on 25 February 2012 at the Royal Opera House in London in a ceremony that the Irish Independent claims cost over one hundred thousand euro.

== Career ==
=== Business ===
In 2013, Ryan launched the brand ROADS, which encompasses luxury fragrances, book publishing and film production. She has said that in setting up ROADS, she wanted to find a way of crossing over from the artistic and creative worlds into tangible products.

There are 18 Eau de Perfum, 5 candles and more than 50 books for sale under the ROADS label around the world.

As of the end of 2013, the Phoenix magazine identified that Roads has accumulated losses of sixty thousand euro, by 2019 The Irish Times confirmed that losses had increased to €769,684 and the accounts show Ms Ryan has ploughed €6.5 million into the company and its parent entity, Portico Capital Management Ltd, through loans. Separate accounts for Roads Fragrance Ltd show that accumulated losses at that company increased by €38,920 to €1.841 million in 2019. Accumulated losses increased to just under €2.1 million at Portico Capital Management that year.

== Philanthropy ==
The Danielle and Cathal Ryan Trust has donated to Our Lady's Children's Hospital, Crumlin in 2017 and Temple Street Children's University Hospital in 2019, both in Dublin.

In 2017, Ryan also provided funding to One in Four, a charity in Ireland which helps people affected by childhood sexual abuse by agreeing to fund two years' salary for a psychotherapist.

=== UNICEF ===
Ryan announced in 2011, at the United Nations General Assembly, that her family would donate $14 million to help some of the most vulnerable children in Sri Lanka. This was the largest single private donation ever made to UNICEF, for which Ryan received the UNICEF Ireland's children's award from former Irish president, her husbands Aunt, Mary Robinson in 2012.

The donation was used to rebuild the health and education infrastructure in four towns in the North of Sri Lanka that had been destroyed by the Sri Lankan Civil War.

She worked with UNICEF, and gave keynote speeches on their behalf during her time as a member of the UNICEF International Council.

== Acting ==
Ryan graduated from the Royal Academy of Dramatic Art in 2006.

In 2007, she made her theatrical stage debut in Food to positive reviews. In the same year, she appeared in How About You, a film based on a collection of stories by Maeve Binchy and The Trial of Tony Blair. She has also appeared in Vivarium, which premiered at the 2019 Cannes Film Festival, The Silencing, Wild Mountain Thyme alongside Jamie Dornan, Emily Blunt and Jon Hamm. and Mr. Malcolm's List.

Her television work includes her role as Alice in Magpie Murders, Vicky Boyle in Harry Wild and Agent Sophia Elias in The Professionals along with roles in Doctors, The Tudors, Casualty (TV series) and Fair City. Ryan is credited as a producer on six productions, including Grace Jones: Bloodlight and Bami, Song of Granite, which was selected as the Irish entry for the Best Foreign Film at the 90th Academy Awards, Rialto, which premiered at the Venice Film Festival in 2019 and L.O.L.A., which wrapped in November 2020.

Ryan appeared in the 2024 film "The End", which premiered at that years Toronto Film Festival. In 2024, she also appeared on stage at the Irish Repertory Theatre off-Broadway in New York where she played the role of Judith in Brian Friel's Aristocrats.

=== The Lir Academy ===
Trinity College Dublin discontinued its acting degree in 2007, leaving Ireland with 'no high-level full-time actor training'. In response, Ryan founded The Lir, Ireland's National Academy of Dramatic Art, which she announced in 2009.

The Lir is part of Trinity College Dublin and has an association with the Royal Academy of Dramatic Art in London. It welcomed its first students in 2011, its opening attracting press coverage from the New York Times. Ryan funded a purpose-built premises for the Lir, which is located in Grand Canal Dock in Dublin.

The Lir offers conservatoire training for actors along with degrees in stage management and technical theatre as well as Masters in Fine Art for playwriting, theatre directing and stage design.

== Filmography ==
=== Acting ===
Year	Title	Role	Other notes
2006	Doctors	Milly Moreton	TV series
2007	Food	Cordelia/Brigitte	Theatre, Battersea Arts Centre, London
2007	How About You	Maria	Feature film
2007	Fair City	Frieda Garvey	TV series
2007	The Trial of Tony Blair	PM's Assistant	TV film
2008	Casualty	Cheryl Reisman	TV series
2008	The Tudors	Martha	TV series
2019	Vivarium	Mom	Feature film
2019	The Professionals	Agent Sophia Elias	TV series
2020	The Silencing	Dr Patel	Feature film
2020	Mr. Malcolm's List	Lady Margaret	Feature film
2021	Wild Mountain Thyme	Maeve	Feature film
2021	Magpie Murders	Alice	TV series
2021	Harry Wild	Vicky Boynes	TV series
2021	The Cordelia Dream	Woman	Theatre, Irish Repertory Theatre, New York
2022	Double Threat	Natasha	Feature film
2023	Night Train	Holly	Feature film
2024	Aristocrats	Judith	Theatre, Irish Repertory Theatre, New York
2024	The End	Mary	Feature Film

=== Producing ===
Year	Title	Role	Notes
2011	Dreams of a Life	Associate producer	
2015	Being AP	Executive producer	
2016	We are Moving	Executive producer	
2017	Song of Granite	Executive producer	Selected as the Irish entry for the Best Foreign Film in the 90th Academy Awards
2017	Grace Jones: Bloodlight and Bami	Executive producer	
2019	Rialto	Executive producer	
