= The Chelsea Detective =

British television detective drama series

- Genre: Crime drama; Mystery
- Created by: Peter Fincham
- Starring: Adrian Scarborough; Sonita Henry; Vanessa Emme; Peter Bankolé; Lucy Phelps
- Composer: Ian Arber
- Country of origin: United Kingdom
- Original language: English
- No. of series: 4
- No. of episodes: 16

Production
- Executive producers: Peter Fincham; Catherine Mackin; Bea Tammer; Wolfgang Feindt; Caroline Stone
- Producers: Ella Kelly; Glen Laker; Lauriel Martin; Charlotte Rutherford
- Cinematography: Rob Kiztman; Pete Rowe; Annemarie Lean-Vercoe; Tom Hines
- Editors: David Head; David Barrett; Xavier Russell; Rob Platt; David L'Anson
- Running time: 88 minutes
- Production company: Expectation Television

Original release
- Network: Acorn TV
- Release: 7 February 2022 – present

The Chelsea Detective is a British crime drama television series, created by Peter Fincham and broadcast on Acorn TV since its premiere on 23 February 2022. The series focuses on various murder cases which take place in Chelsea, London and the efforts of Detective Inspector Max Arnold and his partner to solve the crimes. The third series was broadcast in 2025. The fourth series started production in mid-2025 and was broadcast in August 2026.

== Premise ==
London's Chelsea neighbourhood is a beautiful borough for beautiful people, but it has a dark underside of deception, violence, greed and murder. Bodies have a way of showing up, and things are rarely what they seem. The story follows Detective Inspector Max Arnold and his partner as they investigate these murders.

== Cast ==
- Adrian Scarborough as DI Max Arnold
- Sonita Henry as DS Priya Shamsie (Series 1)
- Vanessa Emme as DS Layla Walsh (Series 2-present)
- Peter Bankolé as DC Connor Pollock
- Lucy Phelps as DC Jess Lombard
- Sophie Leigh Stone as Ashley Wilton, Chief Forensics Officer
- Anamaria Marinca as Astrid Fischer, Max's Ex-Wife
- Frances Barber as Olivia Arnold, Max's Aunt

== Series overview ==
Series	Episodes	Originally released	
Series	Episodes	First released	Last released
1	4	7 February 2022	28 February 2022
2	4	28 August 2023	18 September 2023
3	4	16 December 2024	21 April 2025
4	4	3 August 2026	24 August 2026

== Episodes ==
=== Series 1 (2022) ===
No. overall	No. in series	Title	Directed by	Written by	Original release date
1	1	"The Wages of Sin"	Richard Signy	Glen Laker	7 February 2022
Stonemason Andrew Knightley is pushed under a London Underground train during the morning rush hour. DI Max Arnold and his partner, DS Priya Shamsie, build a picture of a lonely, devout, and troubled man who believed a spirit was leaving him vengeful Biblical messages. But the killer is flesh and blood, and a more earthly explanation may be found in the truth of Knightley's life.
2	2	"Mrs Romano"	Richard Signy	Glen Laker	14 February 2022
This case follows the disappearance of a social media sensation who is married to the owner of an upmarket Chelsea eatery. Soon the investigation turns into a murder investigation and Max finds himself embroiled in explosive family politics.
3	3	"The Gentle Giant"	Darcia Martin	Peter Fincham	21 February 2022
A popular security guard is stabbed to death on a patch of waste ground. He leaves behind his terminally ill wife and at first, it appears he died as a result of a drug deal gone wrong. However, as Max and Priya soon realize, nothing is as it seems.
4	4	"A Chelsea Education"	Darcia Martin	Liz Lake	28 February 2022
A teacher in a prestigious international school is murdered at home shortly before he's due to move to Japan. Although the teacher is said to have been well-liked, it seems there’s no shortage of suspects in his murder.

=== Series 2 (2023) ===
No. overall	No. in series	Title	Directed by	Written by	Original release date
5	1	"The Blue Room"	Richard Signy	Glen Laker	28 August 2023
When an art gallery manager is strangled during the robbery of an exhibition, it appears he was in the wrong place at the wrong time. But as the team delve into the elite world of Chelsea's art scene, Max soon wonders if the victim was an accomplice.
6	2	"Golden Years"	Richard Signy	Peter Fincham	4 September 2023
A woman at a luxury retirement home dies mysteriously, and with no signs of forced entry, suspicion falls on the staff and residents. But tensions within her family point to another cause, harking back to their time in Apartheid-era South Africa.
7	3	"The Reliable Witness"	Sarah Esdaile	Liz Lake	11 September 2023
The most likely culprit in the murder of a psychotherapist is an ex-patient with a history of erratic behaviour. As the team dig into the therapist's personal life, they uncover disturbing revelations that cast a new light on his killing.
8	4	"A Crime of Passion"	Sarah Esdaile	Laura Poliakoff	18 September 2023
Jack Felton, the charming owner of a fruit and vegetable delivery company, is found stabbed at home in what looks like a frenzied attack. The detectives must unravel romantic jealousies, family conflicts, and business rivalries to nab the killer.

=== Series 3 (2024/25) ===
No. overall	No. in series	Title	Directed by	Written by	Original release date
9	1	"Everybody Loves Chloe"	Jennie Darnell	Peter Fincham	16 December 2024
During the Christmas season, the detectives must investigate the mysterious death of Chloe Carmichael, a singer found drowned in her home, amidst leads uncovering drug dealings and affairs in high places.
10	2	"Deadlock"	Jennie Darnell	Glen Laker	7 April 2025
When a dead body is unearthed, Max and Layla race to identify the victim. Their investigation takes them from a city estate to the US embassy, where powerful forces stand in their way. They must use every trick up their sleeves to catch the killer.
11	3	"Myths and Legends"	Richard Signy	Debbie Oates & Ian Kershaw	14 April 2025
When antiques dealer Niall Hammond is found dead in his shop, Max and Layla are drawn into a puzzling investigation that leads them from a renowned music society to mudlarks combing the Thames' foreshore. The discovery of a rare gold coin worth £1 million points to greed as a possible motive—but as they dig deeper into Niall's personal life, it becomes clear that family tensions and buried secrets may have played a role. To solve the case, Max and Layla must untangle a web of deceit and determine what's genuine—and what's not.
12	4	"For the Greater Good"	Richard Signy	Nicola Wilson & Glen Laker	21 April 2025
A climate scientist is found dead in a stolen car's boot. As detectives Max and Layla investigate, they uncover possible links to his upcoming conference speech and a complex web of deception.

=== Series 4 (2026) ===
No. overall	No. in series	Title	Directed by	Written by	Original release date
13	1	"Death on the Aether"	Brian Kelly	Glen Laker	3 August 2026
Butler Lucas is found dead in the Thames. The case gets complicated when the team discovers Lucas was actually Billy Paige, an undercover journalist investigating fashion mogul Clare Curtis's household.
14	2	"The 13th Earl"	Richard Signy	Peter Fincham	10 August 2026
When gangster Trent Wilsher is found shot dead and prime suspect Rory, Earl of Davenstock, vanishes, DI Arnold must find him before Trent's brother seeks revenge on the remaining Davenstocks.
15	3	"Beauty Costs"	Audrey Cooke	Liz Lake	17 August 2026
Sonia Blessing is found dead in her salon. DI Arnold questions an ex-boyfriend and angry clients, but the truth behind her murder runs deeper, involving a hidden identity and an escape from coercion.
16	4	"The Petrov Extension"	Audrey Cooke	Peter Fincham	24 August 2026
On the night that celebrated architect Rowan Jameson is to receive a lifetime achievement award, he's thrown to his death from a hotel balcony. Following a second murder in Cambridge, Max and his team uncover a conspiracy linking both victims.
