= Our House (2026 film) =

2026 film directed by Peter Young

Our House is a 2026 Northern Irish thriller, written and directed by Peter Young, in his feature directorial debut. The film stars Michael Shea, Hannah McClean and Andy Doherty as estranged siblings who reunite for their mother’s wake, an event that triggers an inheritance dispute.

The film had its world premiere as the opening film of the 2026 Galway Film Fleadh in July 2026.

== Premise ==
Three estranged siblings, Nathan, Patricia, and Thomas, reassemble at the family home in the aftermath of their mother’s death. Long-buried tensions resurface as the terms of her will spark a bitter inheritance battle that escalates into violence. The film blends black comedy with siege-thriller tension.

== Cast ==
- Michael Shea as Nathan
- Hannah McClean as Patricia
- Andy Doherty as Thomas
- Carol Moore as the siblings’ mother

== Production ==
Our House was developed by Young and producer Callum Harrison over roughly three years. It was produced by Village Films, with Northern Ireland Screen, Yellowmoon, and Lime Tree Films serving as executive producers. The film was made through Northern Ireland Screen’s New Talent Focus scheme, which supports one debut feature per year from a Northern Ireland–based writer-director-producer team, and was shot largely on location in County Antrim.

Before directing Our House, Young made a number of short films, including Pub House (2023), which was nominated for Best Northern Irish Film at the British Short Film Awards and screened at the BFI London Film Festival. He also shadowed directors Chris Baugh and Brad Anderson through Northern Ireland Screen’s Director Shadowing scheme.

== Release ==
Our House premiered as the opening film of the 2026 Galway Film Fleadh. Young was also nominated for the festival’s Bingham Ray New Talent Award.

== Reception ==
Reviewing the Fleadh programme for RTÉ, one critic called the film an entertaining debut, describing it as a family drama with dark comic elements and social commentary on contemporary Ireland.
