= Frank Blake (actor) =

Irish actor

- Born: Tuamgraney, County Clare
- Education: The Lir Academy
- Occupation: Actor
- Years active: 2017–present
- Television: Normal People; Sanditon; Blue Lights

Frank Blake is an Irish stage, television and film actor.

== Early life and education ==
Frank Blake was born to Michael and Mary Blake and is the youngest of three children. He is from Tuamgraney, in County Clare.

He attended the annual amateur drama festival circuit each year from the age of four in his home town, with plays staged in the school hall. He was educated at Scariff Community College. He made his stage debut aged 17, in the community musical performance of Jesus Christ Superstar.

Blake spent a year at NUI Galway studying drama, German, and philosophy, and also appeared in eight plays in Dramsoc that year. He moved to Dublin and graduated from The Lir Academy in 2016.

== Career ==
=== Stage ===
Blake's stage performances include a role with an all-star cast in Druid Theatre Company's Richard III which was also performed at venues including the Lincoln Center in New York. He played Neoptolemus in a stage version of Hecuba by Rough Magic.

He appeared in a stage adaptation of Louise O'Neill's novel Asking For It produced by Landmark Productions and the Everyman Theatre, Cork which was also seen at the Abbey Theatre. He also appeared in Tennessee Williams play The Glass Menagerie at the Gate Theatre, Dublin.

=== Screen ===
On television, he played Constable Pip Bircher in The Frankenstein Chronicles before playing Alan Sheridan on the Lenny Abrahamson television adaptation of Sally Rooney's Normal People. He had roles in Bridgerton, Game of Thrones, and the Tom Holland-led film Cherry. He had a recurring role in the second season of Sanditon, as Captain Declan Fraser, as well as in Netflix series Vikings: Valhalla.

In 2024, he began to portray Shane Bradley in BBC One police drama Blue Lights, joining the show in the second series. He portrayed Seamus Wright in Disney+ historical drama series Say Nothing (2024).

== Personal life ==
His great aunt was the author Edna O'Brien. He told The Irish Times in 2022 that his family run an equestrian centre.

== Filmography ==
Key
†	Denotes works that have not yet been released

Year	Title	Role	Notes
2017	The Frankenstein Chronicles	Constable Pip Bircher	3 episodes
2019	Resistance	Conor	2 episodes
2019	Game of Thrones	Sentry	1 episode
2020	Normal People	Alan	6 episodes
2021	Cherry	Seasoned Medic	
2021	Bridgerton	Harry	1 episode
2021	Invasion	Madden	1 episode
2022	Sanditon	Captain Declan Fraser	6 episodes
2022	Vikings: Valhalla	Birger	2 episodes
2023	Double Blind	Marcus	
2024	Blackshore	Sean	4 episodes
2024-	Blue Lights	Shane Bradley	Series 2 & 3; 12 episodes
2024	Say Nothing	Seamus Wright	3 episodes
TBA	The Border†	Sean	

=== Video game ===
Year	Title	Role	Notes
2026	Directive 8020	Tomas Carter	Voice
