= Dead and Buried (TV series) =

Irish Television series

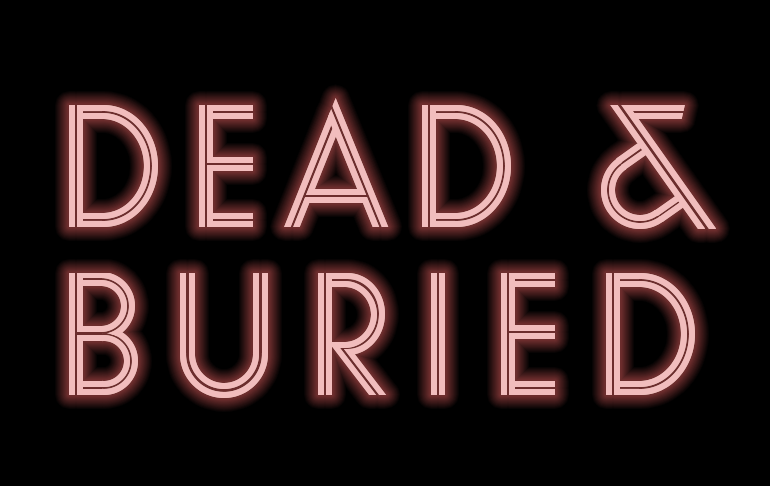
- Title card
- Created by: Colin Bateman
- Screenplay by: Colin Bateman
- Directed by: Laura Way
- Starring: Annabel Scholey; Colin Morgan
- Country of origin: United Kingdom
- Original language: English
- No. of series: 1
- No. of episodes: 4

Production
- Executive producer: Colin Bateman
- Production companies: Virgin Media Television; BBC Studios; All3Media; Three River Fiction; Vico Films

Original release
- Network: Virgin Media Television
- Release: 2 September – 23 September 2024

Dead and Buried is a television drama series starring Annabel Scholey and Colin Morgan. Created by Colin Bateman, it is a four-part adaptation of his play Bag for Life and is directed by Laura Way. The series premiered on Virgin Media Television and BBC Northern Ireland on 2 September 2024.

== Premise ==
A young mum, Cathy, bumps into the man, Michael, convicted of murdering her brother 20 years previously.

== Cast and characters ==
- Annabel Scholey as Cathy McDaid
- Colin Morgan as Michael McAllister
- Kerri Quinn as Sally Bowman, Cathy's friend
- Owen Roe as Jack Sullivan, Michael's father-in-law
- Waj Ali as Raymie McDaid, Cathy's husband.
- Niamh Walsh as Lena McAllister, Michael's wife.
- Michael Hanna as Andrew McAllister, Michael's son
- Declan Rodgers as Detective Cooper
- Joanne Crawford as Dr Kennedy, a psychiatrist

== Production ==
In January 2024, the series was revealed to be in production for Virgin Media Television and BBC One, with Colin Bateman executive producer on the adaptation of his stage play Bag For Life under the title Dead and Buried with Laura Way directing the four-part series and Colin Morgan and Annabel Scholey set in the lead roles. The series is produced by All3Media with Three River Fiction and Vico Films, with support from Screen Ireland, Northern Ireland Screen and Coimisiún na Meán.

In January 2024, it was reported that joining Morgan and Scholey in the cast would be Kerri Quinn, Waj Ali, Owen Roe and Niamh Walsh.

Filming was underway in Northern Ireland in January 2024 with filming also taking place in the Republic of Ireland.

== Broadcast ==
The series was made available in the UK on BBC iPlayer from 2 September 2024.

It was released on Stan in Australia on 7 October 2024.

== Reception ==
The Irish Times described the series as "entertaining", "bonkers" and "cheesy", as well as "ludicrous", noting that "none of the characters behaves rationally, and the action bears only a passing resemblance to the real world."

Digital Spy said that Scholey embraces the role of Cathy with "gusto" but that her "impulsive plan for revenge goes from intriguing, to absurd, to unsatisfying”, and that journey can be "a reflection of the plot as a whole".
