= Dan Nightingale =

British comedian

Dan Nightingale (born 15 March 1981) is an English stand-up comedian and podcaster from Penwortham in Preston, Lancashire.

== Career ==
Nightingale has been a professional comic since 2004. He performed his first UK and Ireland tour in 2022 titled Smasher, and subsequently released the show onto YouTube. Nightingale went on his second tour, in 2023 which was titled 'Dan Nightingale's Special' and released the video version on YouTube in January 2024.

Nightingale's first appearance on national television was on John Bishop's Only Joking, on Sky 1 in 2013.

In 2013 Nightingale was voted Preston's the 'Entertainer of the Year'.

Dan Nightingale has also appeared at the Edinburgh Fringe Festival multiple times. His debut was in 2005 where he appeared with Josie Long in a show titled 'Audience with Josie Long and Dan Nightingale'. Nightingale's second show, in 2008 was named 'Geronimo' where he was noted for his budding 'star quality'. Nightingale returned to the fringe festival in 2012 with 'The Eleven and a Half Ill Conceived Edinburgh Shows of Dan Nightingale'. In 2013 Nightingale's show was titled 'Love in the time of Cholesterol' and his performances were described as 'comforting'. In his fifth year attending the Edinburgh Fringe Nightingale performed the show 'Dan Nightingale is Trying His Best Not to Be a Dick'. Chortle described this show as 'outrageously funny'. His most recent show was 'Sex, Drugs and My Nanna's Bungalow' in 2018 which garnered positive reviews.

=== Have a Word podcast ===
Nightingale founded the Have a Word podcast with fellow comedian Adam Rowe and producer Sensei Carl in 2020. In 2021, Rowe and Nightingale, under the umbrella of Have a Word, released the song "Laura's Gone" in a bid to reach Christmas number 1 and raise money for Zoe's Place Baby Hospice and the Childhood Eye Cancer Trust. The song reached number 39 in the Official Charts Company midweek chart.

In 2022, Have a Word won the Best Podcast at the Chortle Awards. In 2023, it was nominated for the Best Comedy Podcast at the National Comedy Awards.

As of 11 January 2025, Have a Word is the 15th most subscribed to page on Patreon and are ranked 3rd for video content.

== Awards ==
Year	Category	Award	Result
2009	Chortle Awards	Best Compere	Nominated
2015	Comics' Comic Awards	Best MC	Won
2018	Chortle Awards	Best Compere	Nominated
2019	North West Comedy Awards	Best Act	Won
2019	Chortle Awards	Best Compere	Nominated
2020	North West Comedy Awards	Best Act	Won
2020	North West Comedy Awards	Best Compere	Won
2020	North West Comedy Awards	Best Podcast (Hack Radio)	Nominated
2020	Chortle Awards	Best Compere	Nominated
2022	North West Comedy Awards	Best Act	Won
2022	North West Comedy Awards	Social Media Award (Have a Word)	Won
2022	North West Comedy Awards	Best Podcast (Have a Word)	Won
2022	Chortle Awards	Best Podcast (Have a Word)	Won
2023	National Comedy Awards	Best Comedy Podcast (Have a Word)	Nominated

== Personal life ==
Nightingale's mother died when he was 16.

Nightingale started a degree in Politics at Newcastle University but dropped out to pursue a career in comedy.
