= Adam Rowe =

British comedian

Adam Rowe (/roʊ/; born 11 January 1992) is an English stand-up comedian, podcaster, producer and director from Liverpool.

== Early life ==
Rowe was brought up in Dovecot and West Derby areas of Liverpool, England. Rowe attended Cardinal Heenan Catholic High School in Knotty Ash, in which he details the anomalous quantity of murderers who attended the school in his academic year. Rowe started a maths degree at the University of Liverpool but did not complete it in order to concentrate on performing comedy.

== Career ==
Rowe was named Liverpool's Hot Water Comedy Club's Comedian of the Year in 2011, ahead of fellow comic Tony Carroll, who has since begun to host the ‘Hot Water Green Room Podcast’ with comic Jamie Hutchinson.

Rowe's 2018 Edinburgh Festival Fringe show Undeniable was described as "saying something vital and fresh" and "structured, consistently funny and well-crafted routine." Rowe won the Funniest Joke of the Fringe award that year with the joke "Working at the Jobcentre has to be a tense job - knowing that if you get fired, you still have to come in the next day." Rowe begrudges this award as he believes the joke he was commended for doesn’t accurately portray his style as a comic, and that audiences who will be enticed to his shows based on the award may mistake him for a one-liner comic.

Rowe's 2019 Edinburgh show was called Pinnacle and was described as "another irrepressible and articulate hour by a rising talent".

Rowe has appeared on BBC Radio 5 Live show Fighting Talk, The News Quiz, on the award-winning Liverpool-based podcast The Anfield Wrap, and on Roast Battle.

=== Have A Word podcast ===
Rowe has his own podcast Have A Word with fellow comedian Dan Nightingale. They have a producer and part owner of the podcast called Sensei Carl In 2021, Rowe and Nightingale, under the umbrella of Have A Word, released the song Laura's Gone in a bid to reach Christmas number 1 and raise money for Zoe's Place Baby Hospice and the Childhood Eye Cancer Trust. The song reached number 39 in the Official Charts Company midweek chart.

In 2022, Have A Word won the Best Podcast at the Chortle Awards. In 2023, it was nominated for the Best Comedy Podcast at the National Comedy Awards.

As of 13th October 2026, Have A Word is the 17th most subscribed to page on Patreon, however they are ranked 5th for video content.

=== Stand Up Specials ===
Rowe has released several full-length stand-up specials, including Club Comic (2020), Imperious (2023), Juicy (2023) and What's Wrong With Me? (2024). The specials were self-produced and released on YouTube.

== Awards ==
| Year | Category | Award | Result |
|---|---|---|---|
| 2018 | Dave | Joke of the Fringe | Won |
| 2022 | Chortle Awards | Best Club Comedian | Won |
| 2022 | Chortle Awards | Best Podcast (Have A Word) | Won |
| 2023 | National Comedy Awards | Best Comedy Podcast (Have A Word) | Nominated |
