= Verdigris (film) =

2023 Irish film

- Theatrical film poster
- Directed by: Patricia Kelly
- Written by: Patricia Kelly
- Produced by: Paul FitzSimons; Patricia Kelly
- Starring: Geraldine McAlinden; Maya O'Shea; Michael James Ford; Andrew Kingston; Sally Elsbury; Patricia Kelly
- Cinematography: Tania Freimuth
- Edited by: Patricia Kelly
- Music by: Joseph Conlan
- Release dates: July 14, 2023 (Galway); April 18, 2025 (Ireland)
- Running time: 95 mins.
- Country: Ireland
- Language: English

Verdigris is a 2023 Irish drama film, directed, written, and edited by Patricia Kelly, who also acted in the film. The film also stars Geraldine McAlinden, Maya O'Shea, Andrew Kingston, Michael James Ford, and Sally Elsbury. It premiered at the Galway Film Fleadh in 2023, before being released country-wide in Ireland in 2025.

== Plot ==
Trapped in a marriage with a controlling husband, middle-aged, middle-class Marian takes on a secret part-time job as a census enumerator. The job is no picnic. On her tough inner-city route, she faces dismissive and abusive locals who flatly refuse to engage in the census. This includes brash and no-nonsense teenager Jewel, who Marian soon realises is living alone with no obvious means of supporting herself. Marian finds herself striking a deal with Jewel - she won't report her to the authorities if Jewel helps her get the locals to fill out their census forms. As they walk the streets of Dublin, an unlikely friendship blooms.

== Cast ==
- Geraldine McAlinden as Marian
- Maya O'Shea as Jewel
- Andrew Kingston as Hugo
- Michael James Ford as Nigel
- Sally Elsbury as Mona
- Patricia Kelly as Patricia

== Reception ==
Tara Brady of The Irish Times stated that "Patricia Kelly's remarkable debut is a delicate drama about tricky subjects". Gemma Creagh of Film Ireland effuses praise for the performances, commenting on the "deep chemistry between the defensive generosity captured by Maya O'Shea (Jewel) and Geraldine McAlinden's heartbreakingly raw depiction of Marian."

Hilary White of the Irish Independent also commends the "excellent performances of the leads". And the website No More Workhorse lauds the "low-budget" film for being "serious and [having] heart".
