= Agnes O'Casey =

English actor (born December 1995)

- Born: Agnes Eustacia Kenig; 1995 or 1996 (age 30–31); Finsbury Park, London, England
- Education: The Lir Academy
- Occupation: Actress
- Years active: 2020–present
- Relatives: Seán O'Casey (great-grandfather)

Agnes Eustacia Kenig (born 1995/1996), known professionally as Agnes O'Casey, is an English actress. On television, she is known for her roles in the BBC One drama Ridley Road (2021) and the Apple TV series Star City (2026). Her films include The Miracle Club, Lies We Tell (both 2023) and Small Things like These (2024). She was named a 2024 Screen International Star of Tomorrow.

== Early life ==
O'Casey is from Finsbury Park, London, the elder of two daughters of hospitality and retail workers. Through her paternal grandmother Shivaun O'Casey, the Irish playwright Seán O'Casey was her great-grandfather. Her paternal grandfather was the actor Laurence Kenig, who had Lithuanian-Jewish heritage.

O'Casey has dyslexia and attended a Steiner School. Her family moved to Newton Abbot, Devon when she was 11. She studied art history and English literature at Edinburgh University for a year before being accepted to The Lir Academy in Dublin, graduating with a Bachelor of Arts in acting in 2020.

== Career ==
After appearing in the music video for "Holy Show" by the Pillow Queens in 2020 and the Druid Theatre Company production of The Seagull in 2021, O'Casey made her television debut in the 1960s-set BBC One drama Ridley Road, starring as the lead character Vivien Epstein. This was followed by a supporting role as Emilie in the Starz adaptation of Dangerous Liaisons the next year.

In 2023, O'Casey made her feature film debut in Thaddeus O'Sullivan's comedy-drama The Miracle Club and Lisa Mulcahy's period drama Lies We Tell with David Wilmot. O'Casey received IFTA nominations for both performances in the supporting actress and lead actress categories respectively. She was attached to the film Longbourn.

In 2024 she made her British stage debut as she originated the role of Liz Gold in the acclaimed theatrical adaptation of The Spy Who Came in From the Cold by John le Carré, adapted by David Eldridge and directed by Jeremy Herrin. O'Casey played opposite Rory Keenan and John Ramm. The production was performed at the Minerva Theatre at Chichester Festival Theatre as part of the 2024 season. The production went on to move to the West End at @sohoplace in 2025. Theatre critics dubbed Agnes' performance "a striking breath of fresh air".

In 2026, O'Casey is starring in the Apple TV Soviet space race drama Star City as Irina Morozova, a member of the KGB's surveillance department.

She has an upcoming role in the BBC adaptation of John Le Carré's Legacy of Spies.

== Filmography ==
=== Film ===
Year	Title	Role	Notes
2023	The Miracle Club	Dolly	
2023	Lies We Tell	Maud	
2024	Small Things Like These	Sarah Furlong	

=== Television ===
Year	Title	Role	Notes
2021	Ridley Road	Vivien Epstein	Main role, miniseries
2022	Dangerous Liaisons	Emilie	Recurring role, 3 episodes
2024	Wolf Hall: The Mirror and the Light	Meg Douglas	Recurring role, 4 episodes
2024	Black Doves	Dani	Recurring role, 3 episodes
2026	Star City	Irina Morozova	Main role
TBA	Legacy of Spies	Liz Gold	

=== Music videos ===
- "Holy Show" (2020), Pillow Queens

== Stage ==
Year	Title	Role	Notes
2021	The Seagull	Lily	Druid Theatre Company
2024	The Spy Who Came in from The Cold	Liz Gold	Chichester Festival Theatre

== Awards and nominations ==
Year	Award	Category	Work	Result	Ref.
2024	Irish Film & Television Awards	Lead Actress – Film	Lies We Tell	Won	
2024	Irish Film & Television Awards	Supporting Actress – Film	The Miracle Club	Nominated	
