= Hannah McClean =

Northern Irish actress

- Born: Ballymoney, Northern Ireland
- Occupation: Actress
- Television: Blue Lights

Hannah McClean is a Northern Irish actress.

== Early life ==
From Ballymoney in Northern Ireland, she later moved to England in the early 2010s.

== Career ==
She appeared in the 2017 comedy series Sick Note alongside Nick Frost and Lindsay Lohan.

She plays Jen Robinson in the first two series of the BBC One crime drama series Blue Lights, set in Northern Ireland, with her character transitioning from the police force to be a trainee solicitor. For the role she consulted a legal expert on historical cases involving The Troubles. She returned for the fourth series in 2026.

In July 2024, she was cast in the second series of ITV drama Malpractice. She has roles in BBC comedy series Rewarding and ITV true crime series Bad Blood.

== Filmography ==
=== Film ===
Year	Title	Role	Notes
2014	Intervention	Rosie	Short films
2019	Hamsbury Book Club	Verity	Short films
2024	The Awakening	(unknown)	Short films
2025	The Running Man	Charlotte	
2026	Our House	Patricia	

=== Television ===
Year	Title	Role	Notes
2013	6Degrees	Sarah	Series 2; episode 6
2017	Sick Note	Chemo Nurse	Series 1; episode 4: "The Golden Grain"
2017	Josh	Siobhan	Series 3; episode 4: "The Old Lady & The Swan"
2023–2026	Blue Lights	Jen Robinson	Main role; series 1, 2 and 4
2025	Malpractice	Rosie Newman	Series 2; episode 1
2026	Rewarding	Sinead	Main cast
