= Blue Lights (2023 TV series) =

Northern Irish police drama television series

- Title card
- Genre: Police procedural Crime drama
- Created by: Declan Lawn; Adam Patterson
- Written by: Declan Lawn; Adam Patterson; Fran Harris; Bronágh Taggart; Noel McCann; Morna Regan
- Directed by: Gilles Bannier (series 1); Declan Lawn and Adam Patterson (series 2); Jack Casey (series 2 and 3); Angela Griffin (series 3 and 4); Sam O’Mahony (series 4)
- Starring: Siân Brooke; Katherine Devlin; Nathan Braniff; Martin McCann; Richard Dormer
- Theme music composer: Eoin O'Callaghan; Elma Orkestra
- Country of origin: United Kingdom
- Original language: English
- No. of series: 4
- No. of episodes: 24

Production
- Executive producers: Stephen Wright; Louise Gallagher; Tommy Bulfin; Declan Lawn; Adam Patterson; Gilles Bannier
- Producer: Carol Moorhead
- Production location: Northern Ireland
- Cinematography: Stephen Murphy; Angus Mitchell
- Running time: 60 minutes
- Production companies: Two Cities Television; Gallagher Films; HotSauce Pictures (series 2); BBC Studios

Original release
- Network: BBC One
- Release: 27 March 2023 – present

Blue Lights is a Northern Irish police procedural television drama series set in the present day and based at the fictional Blackthorn police station in Belfast, Northern Ireland. Created and written by Declan Lawn and Adam Patterson, it is filmed in Belfast and its environs. The first series was directed by Gilles Bannier and began broadcasting on BBC One on 27 March 2023.

The first series followed three probationary police officers of the Police Service of Northern Ireland (PSNI) and the experienced officers who train, mentor, and work with them. The second series, directed by Lawn, Patterson, and Jack Casey, followed the same characters a year later as they tried to quell a Loyalist feud in the city. Both series received critical praise and high viewership. A third series, directed by Casey and Angela Griffin, aired on 29 September 2025. The fourth series, directed by Griffin and Sam O’Mahony, was set six months after the end of the third series, and released on 29 September 2026. Lawn and Patterson announced their departure from the series after the final episode on 3 November, but there has been no announcement of cancellation.

== Cast and characters ==
=== Main ===
- Siân Brooke as Constable Grace Ellis, a former social worker and probationer originally from England
- Katherine Devlin as Constable Annie Conlon, a Catholic probationer
- Nathan Braniff as Constable Thomas "Tommy" Foster, a former fast-track graduate and probationer
- Richard Dormer as Constable Gerry Cliff (Series 1, guest star series 4), an experienced response officer and former Detective Constable in the RUC Special Branch
- Dearbháile McKinney as Constable Aisling Byrne, a probationer originally from Derry
- Frank Blake as Constable Shane Bradley (Series 2–)
- Martin McCann as Constable (Series 1–2) and Acting Sergeant (Series 3–) Steven "Stevie" Neil
- Jonathan Harden as Inspector David "Jonty" Johnson (Series 1–2, guest star Series 4)
- Andi Osho as Sergeant Sandra Cliff, Gerry's English-born wife and originally a custody sergeant, later a response sergeant
- Joanne Crawford as Sergeant (Series 1), Inspector (Series 2–3) and Chief Inspector (Series 4–) Helen McNally
- Andrea Irvine as Chief Superintendent Nicola Robinson
- Hannah McClean as Constable Jennifer Robinson (Series 1–2, recurring Series 4), later a solicitor, Nicola Robinson's daughter
- Desmond Eastwood as Detective Sergeant Murray Canning (Series 1–2), a detective within CID, later the Paramilitary Crime Task Force
- Michael Smiley as Detective Chief Inspector Paul "Colly" Collins (Series 3–4), a C3 Intelligence officer

=== Recurring ===
- Julian Moore-Cook as DCI Damien Marshall, C1 Organised Crime, previously C2 MIT
- Neil Keery as Sergeant Lawrence McCloskey
- Charlie Maher as Donal Fogerty (Series 1–3), an enforcer working for the Ginley family
- Matthew Forsythe as Aodhan McAllister, a criminal defence solicitor
- John Lynch as James McIntyre (Series 1), a Republican gangster
- Abigail McGibbon as Tina McIntyre, James McIntyre's wife who takes over his Republican criminal enterprise
- Michael Shea as Mo McIntyre (Series 1, 3 & 4), James and Tina's son
- Matthew Carver as Cal Ellis (Series 1), Grace's teenage son
- Valene Kane as Angela Mackle (Series 1), Gordy's mother and the widow of a McIntyre gangster
- Dane Whyte O'Hara as Gordon "Gordy" Mackle (Series 1), a teenager who works for the McIntyres
- Nabil Elouahabi as Joseph (Series 1), a senior MI5 operative
- Paddy Jenkins as Alan "Happy" Kelly (Series 1, 2 & 4), a childhood friend of Constable Gerry Cliff
- Seamus O'Hara as Lee Thompson (Series 2–4), an ambitious former soldier and driver working for Loyalist gang leader Jim Dixon
- Seána Kerslake as Mags Thompson (Series 2), Lee's sister and landlady of The Loyal pub
- Craig McGinlay as Craig McQuarrie (Series 2), a former British Army soldier working for the Thompsons
- Dan Gordon as Robert "Rab" McKendry (Series 2 & 4), Lee's uncle and a Loyalist released under the Good Friday Agreement
- Derek Thompson as Robin Graham (Series 2), a retired police officer
- Cathy Tyson as Dana Morgan (Series 3 & 4), the owner of The Deanery private members' club in Belfast
- Leem Lubany as migrant Amira Saeed (Series 4)
- Tabitha Smyth as influencer Katie Close (Series 4)

== Episodes ==
Series	Episodes	Originally released		Average viewership (millions)
Series	Episodes	First released	Last released	Average viewership (millions)
1	6	27 March 2023	1 May 2023	4.35
2	6	15 April 2024	20 May 2024	4.48
3	6	29 September 2025	3 November 2025	4.33
4	6	29 September 2026	3 November 2026	TBA

=== Series 1 (2023) ===
No. overall	No. in season	Title	Directed by	Written by	Original release date	UK viewers (millions)
1	1	"The Code"	Gilles Bannier	Declan Lawn & Adam Patterson	27 March 2023	4.68
New constables Grace, Annie and Tommy struggle with the demands of police work. The police clash with MI5 agents and associates of Republican gangster James McIntyre.
2	2	"Bad Batch"	Gilles Bannier	Declan Lawn & Adam Patterson	3 April 2023	4.25
A poisonous batch of drugs turns up across Belfast. Annie wonders whom she can trust.
3	3	"The Fear"	Gilles Bannier	Fran Harris	10 April 2023	4.17
A paramilitary-style assault case has Grace determined to bring the McIntyres to their knees. Meanwhile, Angela becomes increasingly desperate.
4	4	"Full Moon Fever"	Gilles Bannier	Fran Harris	17 April 2023	4.34
The team attempt to cover for each other during a busy night shift.
5	5	"The Q Word"	Gilles Bannier	Declan Lawn & Adam Patterson	24 April 2023	4.23
Mo risks his relationship with his father, and Tommy is put to the test.
6	6	"Love the One You're With"	Gilles Bannier	Declan Lawn & Adam Patterson	1 May 2023	4.44
Truths are revealed as the team works together in the aftermath of the arms deal.

=== Series 2 (2024) ===
No. overall	No. in season	Title	Directed by	Written by	Original release date	UK viewers (millions)
7	1	"This Too Shall Pass"	Declan Lawn & Adam Patterson	Declan Lawn & Adam Patterson	15 April 2024	4.82
A year into the job, the team are faced with a drug-fuelled crime wave that leads them into a Loyalist estate. A violent clash puts Stevie and Grace's working relationship at risk.
8	2	"Iceberg"	Declan Lawn & Adam Patterson	Declan Lawn & Adam Patterson	22 April 2024	4.41
A loyalist gangland feud turns up the pressure on the section. Annie makes an impetuous decision on a night out.
9	3	"Love Knows"	Declan Lawn & Adam Patterson	Bronágh Taggart	29 April 2024	4.48
As tensions grow in Mount Eden, a response call forces Stevie to confront his past. Annie deals with the consequences of an impulsive decision.
10	4	"The Stamp of Nature"	Jack Casey	Noel McCann	6 May 2024	4.19
Lee is the new boss in Mount Eden. Under pressure from Canning to get results, Shane leads Tommy into danger.
11	5	"Where I Want To Be"	Jack Casey	Declan Lawn & Adam Patterson	13 May 2024	4.33
Annie's job is on the line. As Lee consolidates power, Stevie and Grace are thrown back together on a response call, with terrible consequences.
12	6	"The Loyal"	Jack Casey	Declan Lawn & Adam Patterson	20 May 2024	4.62
Mount Eden descends into chaos as Grace tries to get Henry out from under Lee's control. Happy finally learns the truth.

=== Series 3 (2025) ===
No. overall	No. in season	Title	Directed by	Written by	Original release date	UK viewers (millions)
13	1	"The Party"	Jack Casey	Declan Lawn & Adam Patterson	29 September 2025	4.07
14	2	"Skipper"	Jack Casey	Declan Lawn & Adam Patterson	6 October 2025	3.83
15	3	"The Bird"	Jack Casey	Declan Lawn & Adam Patterson	13 October 2025	4.36
16	4	"The Parting Glass"	Angela Griffin	Declan Lawn & Adam Patterson	20 October 2025	4.30
17	5	"Ordo Ab Chao"	Angela Griffin	Declan Lawn & Adam Patterson	27 October 2025	4.59
18	6	"World of Our Own"	Angela Griffin	Declan Lawn & Adam Patterson	3 November 2025	4.85

=== Series 4 (2026) ===
No. overall	No. in season	Title	Directed by	Written by	Original release date	UK viewers (millions)
19	1	"Eyes"	Angela Griffin	Declan Lawn & Adam Patterson	29 September 2026	N/A
20	2	"Numbers"	Angela Griffin	Noel McCann	6 October 2026	N/A
21	3	"Everybody Knows"	Sam O'Mahony	Morna Regan	13 October 2026	N/A
22	4	"So Far"	Angela Griffin	Declan Lawn & Adam Patterson	20 October 2026	TBD
23	5	"Ghosts"	Sam O'Mahony	Bronágh Taggart	27 October 2026	TBD
24	6	"The Line"	Sam O'Mahony	Declan Lawn & Adam Patterson	3 November 2026	TBD

== Production ==
=== Development of Series 1 ===
On 14 February 2022, the BBC announced that filming for an upcoming police procedural called Blue Lights had begun in Belfast, Northern Ireland, and its surrounding areas. It was set to contain six episodes and air on BBC One and BBC iPlayer. The series was co-created and written by Declan Lawn and Adam Patterson, and produced by Two Cities Television and Northern Ireland Screen.

Lawn and Patterson said that the BBC commissioned a pilot and the first writers' room for the show in 2019. By the time the show was greenlit, the development of the series was affected by the COVID-19 pandemic, as writers' rooms had to be moved online. The show was commissioned by Piers Wenger and Charlotte Moore, and is distributed internationally by BBC Studios.

The proposed series was described as "an authentic, gripping and darkly funny drama about ordinary people doing an extraordinary job in a society that could spiral out of control at any moment". The series follows three rookie police officers working in Belfast, described as "a uniquely dangerous place to be a police officer", and the "unique set of pressures and dangers they face as frontline cops". The three were described as being in their probation period, with the odds of all three passing stacked against them. Director Gilles Brannier called the procedural context "quite challenging" to her own vision for this show, as she intended it to be mainly character-driven.

Lawn and Patterson suggested the appeal of the series was the "great universality" of its themes, coupled with its "slice of life" view of Belfast. The writers further added that due to being set in modern-day Belfast, the officers would face "a very specific set of policing problems from the legacy of sectarian violence". Patterson even likened the job of being a police officer in Belfast to "trench warfare", saying that the series would reflect the "lingering threat" to police officers in Belfast.

Lawn and Patterson aimed to represent Belfast with the series, as they both grew up there, explaining: "Every writer wants to explore their own place, and their own society as authentically and as honestly as they can. We feel enormously grateful to BBC drama for letting us do that with Blue Lights". Brannier wanted to portray Belfast differently to the usual way, to "step away from the black and white representation of Belfast", calling it a fantastic challenge. Many crew members described the city itself as another character in the show. Lawn said: "We've always dreamed of making a show in Belfast and Blue Lights is a distillation of everything we've learned from living here and being journalists here. We think it shows the city in a way that's never been shown before in terms of the bad and the good, the kind of vibrancy of it and the problems of it". They noted that some of their "more established stars", who grew up in Belfast, understood the dangers of the jobs. Lawn said: "They could explain the context to the others".

Lawn described his own experiences growing up in the city, where he would feel at "constant risk" and never knew if his parents would return home from work at the end of a weekday. Lawn said that some of the actors, especially the younger ones, were surprised to learn about the treatment of police officers in Northern Ireland. According to Patterson, when writing Blue Lights, he and Lawn aimed to challenge people's mindsets, saying: "I think if you think about the world like that, then you can actually move forward as a society. But if you lock yourself away and put yourself in a binary mindset then you can't. So our objective always in writing is to push past that and make people challenge themselves."

Blue Lights began airing in early 2023. It was released after the attempted murder of DCI John Caldwell in February 2023, an off-duty police officer who received serious injuries after being shot in front of his son at a sports complex in Omagh, County Tyrone. Patterson paid tribute to Caldwell. He said that the attack was "a reminder as to why the show is so important". He continued: "We can't just ignore the fact that there is still a lingering threat for these people that literally lay themselves on the line to uphold our civic duty. That's amazing, and we just love the police for that. Of course, they’re a flawed machine; like many machines, they have their issues".

=== Series 2–4 ===
Before the first series ended its run, a second series was commissioned, with filming beginning in August 2023. Lawn and Patterson expressed excitement for the second series, saying that: "Blue Lights is a very personal project for us, set in the city where we live, so for us making [a second series] is a special kind of privilege". The second series cast consists of most of the first one, as well as new characters. Stephen Wright, executive producer, enthused that he was "proud" of the reception to Series 1 and was "looking forward to bringing [the] characters and the city of Belfast back for series two as well as introducing some exciting new characters and storylines to the fans".

The BBC announced that the first episode of Series 2 would air at 9 pm on 15 April 2024 on BBC One. All episodes of Series 2 would become available to watch on BBC iPlayer at 6am on the same day while the remainder of the series would air weekly. The characters set to be "facing a whole new set of professional and personal challenges".

During the run of Series 2, in May 2024, the show confirmed that it would return for a third and fourth series. Series 3 began filming in Belfast in February 2025.

The storylines of series 3 and 4 were planned at the same time. After the fourth season ended on 3 November 2026, it was announced that Lawn and Patterson would be leaving the show, and have started working on a new series called D-Notice. However, there has been no formal notice of cancelling the show.

=== Casting ===
Lawn and Patterson met almost 30 Northern Irish police officers to help inform their characters and flesh out the fictional workplace. The cast was described by them as a mix of new and established talent. Siân Brooke plays Grace Ellis, a mother of a teenager who made the decision in her 40s to leave her job as a social worker to join the Police Service of Northern Ireland. This decision was dubbed "the biggest gamble of her life" as she straddles a fine line between the personal and professional. Her fellow rookies are Annie Conlon, played by Katherine Devlin, who is described as someone who "struggles with the fact that her chosen path may mean having to leave everything she's ever known behind", and Tommy Foster, played by newcomer Nathan Braniff, described as a young man who is incompetent at policing, but "desperate to prove himself". Both were inspired by real people Lawn and Patterson met when writing the characters for the series. The three rookie characters were written with an element of innocence and naivety.

Martin McCann received the part of Stevie Neil, a police officer who is partnered with Grace, whom McCann described as an "introverted extrovert" and a "lone wolf". Richard Dormer was cast as veteran police officer Gerry Cliff, described by Lawn and Patterson as "always there with the one liner" and "a natural born rebel", adding that the character was essential for the show's "mixture of darkness and humour". Andi Osho was cast as Gerry's wife Sandra, the main custody sergeant of the station. Joanne Crawford joined as Helen McNally, a sergeant who is "tough" on the probationers because she "knows what the job entails and the type of person who suits it". Hannah McClean was cast as Jen Robinson, a policewoman who is a few years into the job, but who is "work-shy" and dislikes being on patrol. John Lynch portrayed James McIntyre, the main antagonist and head of a terrorist dynasty, whom Lynch describes as a "conundrum" and someone who "takes pleasure in exercising his power and isn’t shy about intimidating people or putting his foot through a door". Jonathan Harden was cast as David "Jonty" Johnson, and the actor was excited to play a role in a Belfast-set TV series. The role of Grace's 17-year-old son was given to newcomer Matthew Carver, who described Cal and Grace's relationship as "close". Director Gilles Bannier described the casting process for the ten main characters as an "absolute joy".

In the second series, every main cast member returned, except Dormer as his character died on-screen, and Lynch as his character was arrested. Frank Blake was cast as Shane Bradley, a constable who was "drafted in to help", but whose true motivations were "unclear". Seamus O'Hara and Seána Kerslake joined the cast as siblings Lee and Mags Thompson. Lee was billed as a military veteran and "a protestant from east Belfast" who begins "feeling exploited by the gangs who run the estate, as well as the people who have let it happen", causing him to become "caught up in a loyalist feud", while Mags was billed as the family pub's owner. Craig McGinlay was cast as Lee's "right-hand man", Craig McQuarrie. Dan Gordon received the role of Mags and Lee's uncle, Rab Thompson.

== Broadcast ==
Series 1 premiered on BBC One in 2023; Series 2 followed in 2024.

The third series aired on 29 September 2025, and a fourth series, set six months after the end of the third series, was released on 29 September 2026. The last episode aired on 3 November 2026.

== Reception ==
=== Critical response ===
Series 1 of Blue Lights received generally positive reviews. On review aggregator website Rotten Tomatoes, it has an approval rating of 91% based on 11 reviews. The website's critical consensus reads, "Intelligently plotted and well-acted, this gruff low-budget procedural gets the green light for an addictive binge watch". Hugo Rifkind of The Times wrote of series one: "The overall arc is subtle, with none of your Line of Duty or Happy Valley-style cliffhangers ... In place and tone, it’s excellent". Carol Midgley of The Times commented that it was "a complicated, cleverly observed, funny and (at times) horrific drama that is a cut above your average police procedural". Anita Singh of The Daily Telegraph gave the series 5 out of 5 stars, writing: "There isn’t a duff line or an overcooked scene to be found here. The various storylines knit together into one satisfying conclusion". Dan Einav of Financial Times wrote: "The series revolves around three new recruits who offer a fresh perspective on a profession that we’ve grown accustomed to seeing through the jaundiced filter of a cynical old-timer." Eilis O'Hanlon of Irish Independent wrote "[Series 1 of] Blue Lights is an unexpectedly tense and engaging addition to the increasingly long list of police dramas on TV". Sean O'Grady of The Independent gave the series 3 out of 5 stars, writing: "There are flashes of gallows humour, almost literally, but the gloom is otherwise unrelieved, and frankly is a bit tiresome to watch".

Rebecca Nicholson of The Guardian called Series 1 "much more than just another cop show". She gave the series 5 out of 5, writing that she was "engrossed", describing it as "well-crafted, fantastically tense, thrilling stuff", and "one of the best shows of the year". Alison Rowat of The Herald wrote that: "Though made for relative pennies compared to the glossy offerings of the streaming channels, this Belfast-set police procedural was a class act, one that made a virtue of its location without straying into cliche or settling for neat answers". Alberto Carlos of Espinof called the series "an excellent police series: it is intense, intelligent and absolutely essential". Ian Acheson in The Spectator called it a "near perfect cop drama" that "manages to humanise the lives of the men and women in the Police Service of Northern Ireland without mawkishness" that despite "some procedural howlers that have clearly been let loose in the service of the storylines", leaves viewers "in for a rare treat". Ángel S. Harguindey of El Pais wrote that "The premise is nothing new, but it has one virtue: its narrative style is uncomplicated and has no need to resort to heroic gestures".

Series 2 also received mostly positive reviews. On Rotten Tomatoes, it has an approval rating of 93% based on 14 reviews. The website's critical consensus reads, "A procedural done precisely by the book, Blue Lights' sophomore season adheres to formula but does so with the utmost efficiency and panache". Jack Seale of The Guardian gave the series 4 out of 5, writing: "Its gift for plain speaking is one thing that makes Blue Lights such rewarding drama, but the difficult political truths are softened by a weakness for that staple of escapist emergency-services soaps, the workplace romance". Nick Hilton of The Independent gave the series 3 out of 5, writing "As generic fare goes, Blue Lights is of the highest order. The acting and writing is first rate, and Brooke, particularly, is a terrific leading lady". Chris Wasser of Irish Independent wrote "Just like last time, it’s all building towards something big, something explosive, even. And, just like last time, Blue Lights remembers the importance of a nail-biting set-piece". Benji Wilson of The Daily Telegraph gave the series 5 out of 5 stars, writing "It doesn’t take long, however, for series two to catch light, and once it does it is irresistible". Dan Einav of Financial Times gave the second series 4 out of 5, writing: "Declan Lawn and Adam Patterson take time to contextualise their fiction within the very real tragedies of Belfast’s past and present. But Blue Lights is neither insistently political nor wearingly downbeat". Carol Midgley of The Times wrote that "The story is still warming up at this stage, but this is dense, rich soil and these are the perfect writers to till it". Hugo Rifkind of The Times wrote that "You do occasionally get the feeling that Belfast only has in it about eight police, who all have to do far too many jobs, like Mrs Rabbit. Still, it’s heavy with mood and has a streak of outraged social politics at its core". Camilla Long of The Times criticised the second series, writing: "The writers saw this, caught our sense of paranoia, creating a horribly plausible show. But the new series doesn’t feel like that any more. It mostly feels like a police sitcom with all the jokes taken out". Helen Hawkins of The Arts Desk gave the series 4 out of 5, saying: "The first season of Blue Lights was so close to police procedural perfection, it would be hard for season two to reach the same heights. Overall, it doesn’t, though there are still special moments". Aidan Smith of The Scotsman wrote that "We could be watching The Wire; Blue Lights is that gritty and aspires to be that great". Alison Rowat of The Herald wrote that "The blending of hard-edged and soft is one of the reasons for the show's success. We want a police procedural set in today's Belfast to keep it real, but not too real".

Series 3 continued to attract good reviews, with Michael Hogan's review in The Guardian headlined "'The best cop show': Blue Lights just gets better with every single episode", and writing "What The Wire did for Baltimore, Blue Lights is doing for Belfast". Forbes reviewer Erik Kain, while holding that the first series was the best, wrote: "Season 3 continues with everything I loved about this show in its first two seasons". He compared the show to Happy Valley and Line of Duty as "a genuinely top-notch police drama".

Jack Seale, writing about series 4 in The Guardian, gave the series 4 out of 5 stars, calling it "TV's most thrilling cop show". The Telegraph called series 4 "as compelling, frightening and chaotic as ever", awarding it 5 out of 5, while the Radio Times gave 3 out of 5, saying that the early episodes "felt a little baggy and loose".

=== Awards and nominations ===
Year	Award	Category	Nominee(s)	Result	Ref.
2023	28th National Television Awards	Best New Drama	Blue Lights	Nominated	
2023	TV Choice Awards	Best New Drama Series	Blue Lights	Nominated	
2023	Royal Television Society Craft & Design Awards	Best Editing – Scripted	Peggy Koretzky	Nominated	
2024	IFTA Film & Drama Awards	Best Drama	Blue Lights	Nominated	
2024	IFTA Film & Drama Awards	Best Script	Blue Lights	Nominated	
2024	IFTA Film & Drama Awards	Best Actor	Martin McCann	Nominated	
2024	IFTA Film & Drama Awards	Best Supporting Actor	Richard Dormer	Won	
2025	Broadcast Awards	Best Drama Series or Serial	Blue Lights	Won	
2025	British Academy Television Awards	Best Drama Series	Blue Lights	Won	
2026	Royal Television Society Programme Awards	Best Drama Series	Blue Lights	Won	
2026	British Academy Television Awards	Best Drama Series	Blue Lights	Nominated	
2026	British Academy Television Awards	Best Actress	Siân Brooke	Nominated	
2026	British Academy Television Awards	Memorable Moment	"The police are warned of an ambush to plot to silence a key witness"	Nominated	
