= Lies We Tell (2023 film) =

2023 Irish film

- Theatrical film poster
- Directed by: Lisa Mulcahy
- Written by: Elisabeth Gooch
- Story by: Sheridan Le Fanu
- Produced by: Ruth Carter
- Starring: Agnes O'Casey; David Wilmot; Chris Walley; Holly Sturton
- Cinematography: Eleanor Bowman
- Edited by: Weronika Kaminska
- Music by: Aza Hand
- Release dates: July 15, 2023 (Galway); October 13, 2023 (Ireland)
- Running time: 89 mins.
- Country: Ireland
- Language: English

Lies We Tell is a 2023 Irish gothic thriller film, directed by Lisa Mulcahy and written by Elisabeth Gooch, based on the novel by Sheridan Le Fanu. It stars Agnes O'Casey, David Wilmot, Chris Walley, and Holly Sturton. It premiered at the Galway Film Fleadh in 2023, before being released throughout Ireland later that year.

== Synopsis ==
An orphaned heiress finds upon her father's death that he has named her uncle, a sinister character, as her guardian, who swiftly moves into her mansion, bringing his son, daughter, and a mysterious French governess with him. He, however, is focused on getting his hands on her money, willing to use anything, including his own son, to influence her into a situation where he will be able to access it. There are extremely dark themes, including rape, blackmail, and threats of torture.

== Cast ==
- Agnes O'Casey as Maud Ruthyn
- David Wilmot as Silas Ruthyn
- Chris Walley as Edward
- Holly Sturton as Emily
- Gráinne Keenan as Madame
- Mark Doherty as Dr. Bryerly
- Elaine O'Dwyer as Mary Quince
- Kieran Roche as Capt. Ilbury
- Eleanor Methven as Mrs. Rusk
- John Olohan as Mr. Rusk
- Heather Leonard as Maud's Daughter

== Reception ==
On the review aggregator website Rotten Tomatoes, 100% of 15 critics' reviews are positive, with an average rating of 7.30/10.

Leslie Felperin of The Guardian gave the film 4/5 stars, and praised the acting, particularly Agnes O'Casey whose "delivery was as sharp as a steak knife". Fionnuala Halligan of Screen Daily agreed, stating O'Casey's performance "gives this pretty period piece a serrated edge". Kevin Harley of Radio Times calls her performance "a compelling take on the Victorian heroine".

June Butler of Film Ireland said writer Elisabeth Gooch adapted Sheridan Le Fanu's novel (Uncle Silas) with "panache and confidence". Julian Roman of MovieWeb said director Lisa Mulcahy did "a banner job" helming the film. Graeme Tuckett of The Post also praised the "acerbic writing" and lauded actor David Wilmot for "walking the line between 'boo-hiss' villainy and something more nuanced/human" in his acclaimed performance.

Donald Clarke of The Irish Times had one bit of criticism, in that he felt the film was "brighter and bolder than would best suit the material. Paul Whitington of the Irish Independent critiqued the film's ending as "a little rushed and not entirely coherent, but…Mulcahy nicely sustains the gothic tension".
