= Malpractice (TV series) =

British television drama

- Genre: Medical drama
- Created by: Grace Ofori-Attah
- Written by: Grace Ofori-Attah
- Directed by: Philip Barantini (Series 1); Anthony Philipson / Jennifer Sheridan (Series 2)
- Starring: Niamh Algar (Series 1); James Purefoy (Series 1); Tom Hughes (Series 2); Selin Hizli (Series 2); Zoe Telford (Series 2)
- Composers: Aaron May; David Ridley
- Country of origin: United Kingdom
- Original language: English
- No. of series: 2
- No. of episodes: 10

Production
- Executive producers: Philip Barantini; Grace Ofori-Attah; Simon Heath
- Producer: Sophie Reynolds
- Cinematography: Matthew Lewis
- Running time: 50 mins. approx
- Production company: World Productions

Original release
- Network: ITV
- Release: 23 April 2023 – 12 May 2025

Malpractice is a British medical drama television series, created and written by Grace Ofori-Attah. Series 1 stars Niamh Algar as a doctor embroiled in a medical scandal, and began airing on 23 April 2023 on ITV and ITVX. The second series stars Tom Hughes, and began on ITV1 on Sunday 4 May 2025.

== Plot ==
=== Series 1 ===
While the respected Dr Lucinda Edwards was treating an opioid-overdose patient, an alarm is sounded, prompting the hospital's staff rush to reception where a man is waving a gun around. Dr Edwards tries to calm him and offers to help the person on the floor with a gunshot wound. The gunshot patient is moved to A&E but to locate a bed, someone else must be moved. Dr Edwards nominates the overdose patient and sends a young doctor with her to continue her care.

Meantime Dr Edwards returns to the gunshot patient who is being prepped for surgery. Then Dr Harris arrives and takes over. The gunshot patient survives but the overdose patient does not. The young doctor had misheard or misinterpreted the instructions Dr Edwards gave, but when the overdose patient's influential barrister father makes a complaint and the General Medical Council decide to take the case to court, it is Dr Edwards whose job appears under most threat. Though she wins the lawsuit, her job remains in jeopardy since the hospital board becomes determined to destroy her to maintain their public image, and her personal problems come to light and her position and life are both on the line as a major pharmaceutical conspiracy starts to unravel.

=== Series 2 ===
Psychiatric registrar Dr James Ford struggles to give a postnatal checkup for a patient in hospital, while on his way to section another patient at their home. Tragedy ensues, leading to an investigation into the events. Dr Ford has to defend himself against the impression he's made a series of poor decisions. Dr Hernandez, the hospital's obstetrics registrar, seeks to deflect any blame onto Dr Ford. Dr Norma Callahan and Dr George Adjei (along with their colleague Kathy Miller) return from Series 1, leading the investigation as they uncover a hospital in conflict with itself.

== Main cast ==
=== Series 1 ===
- Niamh Algar as Dr Lucinda Edwards
- Helen Behan as Dr Norma Callahan
- Jordan Kouamé as Dr George Adjei
- James Purefoy as Dr Leo Harris
- Hannah Walters as Matron Beth Relph
- Adei Bundy as Kathy Miller
- Lorne MacFadyen as Tom Edwards
- Scott Chambers as Dr Oscar Beattie
- Tristan Sturrock as Dr Mike Willett
- Priyanka Patel as Dr Ramya Morgan
- Shelley Leitch as Nurse
- Georgina Rich as Dr Eva Tait
- Ash Tandon as Dr Jubair Singh
- Liberty Miller as Abi Edwards
- Daniel Larkai as Dr Sam Henry

=== Series 2 ===
- Tom Hughes as Dr James Ford
- Helen Behan as Dr Norma Callahan
- Jordan Kouamé as Dr George Adjei
- Selin Hizli as Dr Sophia Hernandez
- Zoe Telford as Dr Kate McCallister
- Ace Bhatti as Mr Arun Mansoor
- Adei Bundy as Kathy Miller
- Rick Warden as Dr Eric Sawers
- Jessica Layde as Dr Bernadette Asamoah
- Hannah McClean as Rosie Newman
- Alex Price as Ed Newman

== Production ==
Malpractice was created and written by Grace Ofori-Attah. Prior to writing, Ofori-Attah had worked as a doctor in the NHS. The first series was filmed in West Yorkshire.

== Episodes ==
=== Series 1 ===
No.	Title	Directed by	Written by	Original release date	UK viewers (millions)
1	"Episode 1"	Philip Barantini	Grace Ofori-Attah	23 April 2023	5.31
2	"Episode 2"	Philip Barantini	Grace Ofori-Attah	30 April 2023	4.54
3	"Episode 3"	Philip Barantini	Grace Ofori-Attah	7 May 2023	3.60
4	"Episode 4"	Philip Barantini	Grace Ofori-Attah	14 May 2023	3.70
5	"Episode 5"	Philip Barantini	Grace Ofori-Attah	21 May 2023	3.78

=== Series 2 ===
No.	Title	Directed by	Written by	Original release date	U.K. viewers (millions)
1	"Episode 1"	Anthony Philipson	Grace Ofori-Attah	4 May 2025	N/A
2	"Episode 2"	Anthony Philipson	Grace Ofori-Attah	5 May 2025	N/A
3	"Episode 3"	Anthony Philipson	Grace Ofori-Attah & Hannah K. Richards	6 May 2025	N/A
4	"Episode 4"	Jennifer Sheridan	Grace Ofori-Attah	11 May 2025	N/A
5	"Episode 5"	Jennifer Sheridan	Grace Ofori-Attah	12 May 2025	N/A

== Broadcast ==
Series 1 began airing on 23 April 2023 on ITV and ITVX. The second series began on ITV1 on Sunday 4 May 2025.

== Reception ==
Series 1: Lucy Mangan of The Guardian awarded the first episode four stars out of five, praising the writing and topicality of the series. Anita Singh in The Telegraph also gave it four stars out of five, highlighting the quality of the acting. Sean O'Grady from The Independent gave the first episode three out of five stars, commending the fusion of hospital drama with a style of police procedurals, but found Lucinda Edwards unengaging as a protagonist.
