= The Miracle Club =

2023 film by Thaddeus O'Sullivan

- Theatrical release poster
- Directed by: Thaddeus O'Sullivan
- Screenplay by: Jimmy Smallhorne; Timothy Prager; Joshua D. Maurer
- Story by: Jimmy Smallhorne
- Produced by: Chris Curling; Joshua D. Maurer; Alixandre Witlin
- Starring: Laura Linney; Kathy Bates; Maggie Smith; Stephen Rea
- Cinematography: John Conroy
- Edited by: Alex Mackie
- Music by: Edmund Butt
- Production companies: Zephyr Films; City Films Entertainment
- Distributed by: Lionsgate UK
- Release dates: 9 June 2023 (Tribeca); 13 October 2023 (UK and Ireland)
- Running time: 90 minutes
- Countries: Ireland; United Kingdom
- Language: English
- Box office: $8 million

The Miracle Club is a 2023 British drama film directed by Thaddeus O'Sullivan, based on a story by Jimmy Smallhorne. The film stars Laura Linney, Kathy Bates, Maggie Smith, and Stephen Rea. Its plot follows a group of working-class women from Dublin on a pilgrimage to Lourdes in France.

The Miracle Club premiered at the Tribeca Festival on 9 June 2023 and was released in the United Kingdom and Ireland by Lionsgate UK on 13 October 2023. It was Maggie Smith's final acting role before her death in September 2024.

== Plot ==
In 1967 Ireland, two elderly women, Lily and Eileen, along with a younger woman, Dolly, form a singing group called the Miracles for a talent show organised by the local Catholic priest and win tickets to go on a pilgrimage to Lourdes for various reasons. Lily wants to go as part of a life-long dream, Eileen hopes the pilgrimage will cure a lump in her breast, while Dolly hopes it will help her mute son Daniel speak. Each of their husbands is vehemently opposed to their going, but the women persist.

At the last minute, they are joined by Chrissie, the estranged daughter of their recently deceased friend Maureen, and cousin to Eileen, who has returned from Boston after 40 years to attend her mother's funeral. She is initially reluctant to join the pilgrimage as her pregnancy with Lily's now-deceased son Declan had been openly revealed by Eileen, resulting in her being banished by the community. However, Chrissie changes her mind after learning that Maureen had bought her a ticket to go, hoping she could reconcile with those she left behind.

Arriving in Lourdes, Lily and Eileen express their enduring hostility to Chrissie, who gets along with Dolly, Daniel and the parish priest, Father Dermot. However, Lily gradually softens her heart after Chrissie easily tends to her deformed leg. At the site's baths, Eileen loses her faith after being told by staff that there are fewer miracles that have happened than what she expected. While Daniel remains mute despite coming into contact with the water and hides in the grotto, where he is comforted by Chrissie. Lily backs out after hearing the screams of those bathing in its frigid waters.

That evening, a drunk Eileen lashes out in the hotel at Chrissie for her past and accuses her of flirting with Father Dermot, whom she also calls a charlatan due to her religious disenchantment. She also reveals that Declan, who was believed to have drowned, had actually committed suicide out of despair when Lily objected to his relationship with Chrissie.

Daniel comes to Chrissie and signals that his mother is in distress. As the women gather around her bedside, Dolly confesses that she had tried to abort Daniel while she was pregnant with him, and expresses her belief that his muteness is a sign of punishment from God. As she is comforted by her companions, Chrissie also confesses to having aborted her unborn child with Declan while she was in Boston.

The next morning, Lily asks Chrissie to accompany her to the baths. While waiting, Lily admits to her that she had lied to Declan about the circumstances of her departure, saying she was leaving for a better life in America and did not want to be with him, which drove Declan to suicide. Lily then asks and receives forgiveness from her before they both take the waters.

As they head home, Eileen apologizes to Father Dermot over her drunken behavior. To this he replies that the real purpose of the pilgrimage is to sustain one's faith even in the absence of miracles. Eileen then reconciles with Chrissie, who reassures her that her lump may not be as serious as she had feared due to the lack of major symptoms.

Arriving at home, the women are greeted by their husbands, who appreciate them more after having had to do household chores in their absence. Daniel utters his first word – "home" –though no one is near to hear him. In an act of reconciliation, Lily invites Chrissie to accompany her and pay respects to Declan at the site where he died.

== Cast ==
- Maggie Smith as Lily Fox
- Laura Linney as Chrissie Ahearn
- Kathy Bates as Eileen Dunne
- Agnes O'Casey as Dolly Hennessy
- Stephen Rea as Frank Dunne
- Mark O'Halloran as Father Dermot Byrne
- Mark McKenna as George Hennessy
- Niall Buggy as Tommy Fox
- Hazel Doupe as Cathy Dunne
- Brenda Fricker as the voice of Maureen
- Lesley Conroy as a nun

== Production ==
In December 2021, the film was in pre-production, having just received additional funding from the U.K. Global Screen Fund. The film was later shot in Dublin in 2022. This was Maggie Smith's final role before her death.

== Release ==
The Miracle Club premiered at the 2023 Tribeca Festival on 9 June 2023. It was released in the United Kingdom by Lionsgate UK on 13 October 2023. Sony Pictures Classics acquired the rights to the film in the United States, Latin America and select territories in Southeast Asia and Eastern Europe. The film was released in the United States on 14 July 2023.

== Reception ==
On the review aggregator website Rotten Tomatoes, 68% of 116 critics' reviews are positive, with an average rating of 5.7/10. Metacritic, which uses a weighted average, assigned the film a score of 51 out of 100, based on 23 critics, indicating "mixed or average" reviews.
