= The Lir Academy =

Irish drama academy

The Lir
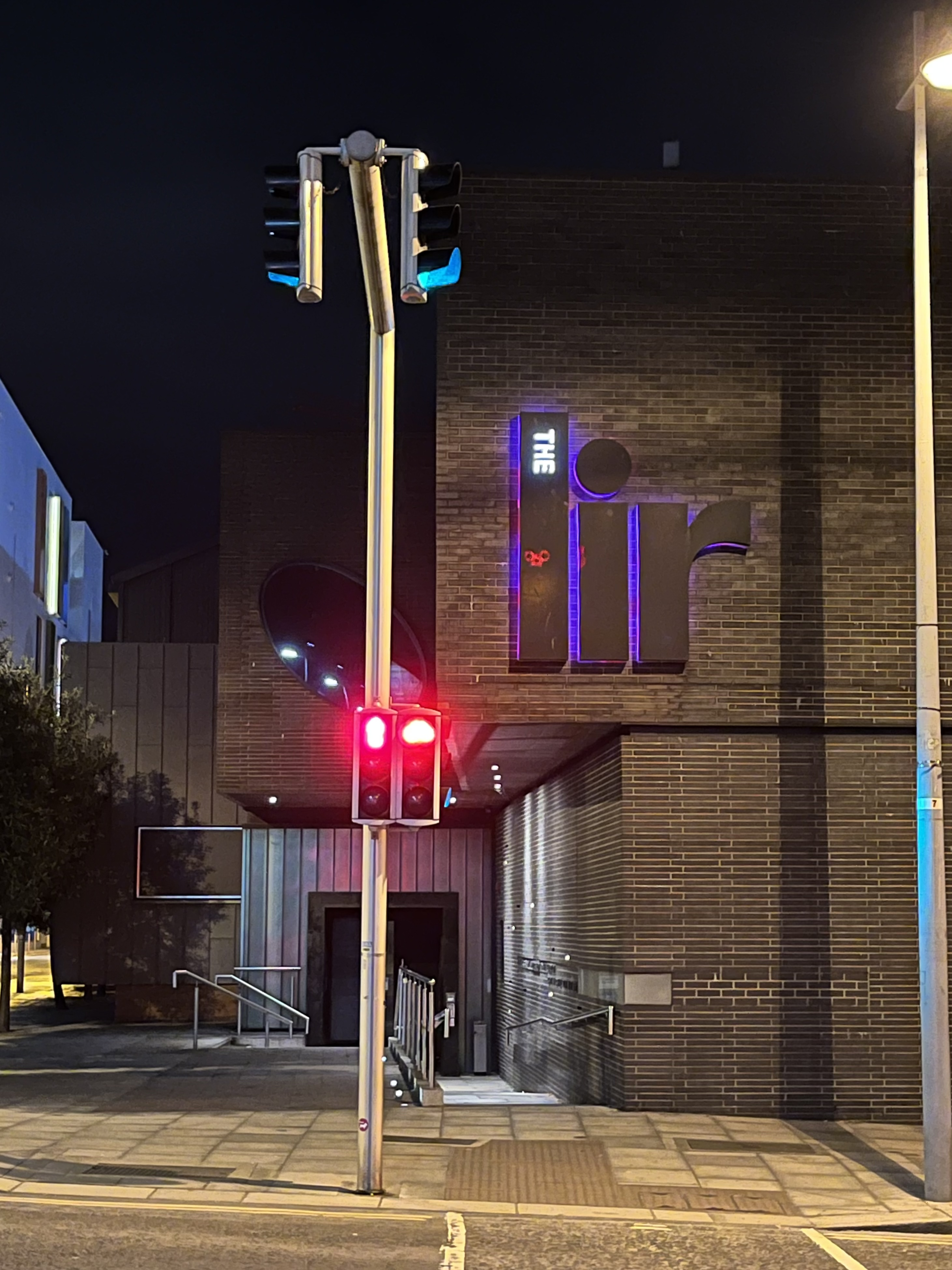
- Type: Drama school
- Established: 2011
- Parent institution: Trinity College Dublin
- Affiliations: Royal Academy of Dramatic Art
- Location: Trinity College Dublin, Pearse Street; Grand Canal Quay, Dublin, Ireland; 53°20′30″N 6°14′21″W
- Website: The Lir

The Lir – National Academy of Dramatic Art is an Irish drama school that offers conservatory training for theatre, film and television from industry professionals. The Lir is located in Dublin, Ireland, and is a part of Trinity College Dublin. It is associated with the Royal Academy of Dramatic Art in London.

== History ==
The Lir was founded by Danielle Ryan in 2011 in collaboration with Trinity College in response to its parent, Trinity College, discontinuing its acting course in 2007. In May 2008, a recommendation was made from the Forum on Actor Training recommending the creation of a national academy of dramatic art to provide university accredited education. The Cathal Ryan Trust funded a purpose-built premises for the Lir, located in Grand Canal Dock in Dublin.

In 2017, The Lir had an annual income of €2.1 million and staged 10 theatre shows, an opera production, two short films, a design exhibition and an industry showcase.

== Courses ==
The Lir provides conservatoire training with degrees in acting, stage management and technical theatre, along with Masters in Fine Art for playwriting, theatre directing and stage design. The school also offers short courses and diploma programs in a range of performing arts disciplines. The Bachelor In Acting, is a three-year degree course for approximately sixteen students per year, has auditions in Ireland and abroad. The academy offers practical training for actors based in part on the acting technique of Konstantine Stanislavski, in combination with training in voice and movement.

== Notable people ==
- Danielle Ryan, co-founder

=== Alumni ===
- Frank Blake
- Cameron Cuffe
- Zara Devlin
- Vanessa Emme
- Kwaku Fortune
- Danielle Galligan
- Éanna Hardwicke
- Ella Lily Hyland
- Lauren-Shannon Jones
- Patrick Martins
- Paul Mescal
- Alex Murphy
- Agnes O'Casey
- Ruairi O'Connor
- Alison Oliver
- John Reardon
