= Vittorio Angelone =

Irish comedian

- Born: 26 May 1996 (age 30); Belfast, Northern Ireland
- Education: Guildhall School of Music and Drama
- Occupations: Comedian, writer, podcaster, actor
- Years active: 2018–present
- Known for: Translations; Mike & Vittorio's Guide to Parenting
- Website: Official website

Vittorio Angelone is an Irish comedian, actor and writer from Belfast. He is known for exploring cultural identity through his work.

== Early life ==
Angelone was born in Belfast to an Italian-Irish family. He relocated to London at the age of 18 to train as a classical percussionist at the Guildhall School of Music and Drama.

== Career ==
Angelone began performing stand-up comedy in 2018. During the COVID‑19 pandemic, he built a significant online following—amassing hundreds of thousands of followers across social media platforms, including 200,000 followers on Instagram. In 2020, having moved back to his home in Belfast at the beginning of the pandemic, Angelone hosted a comedy club in his back garden, with the audience limited to 30 people due to social distancing regulations.

In 2021–22, he debuted his hour-long stand-up show Translations, which explored his experiences as an Italian-Irish person in London. The show, whose structure was loosely based on the play of the same name by Irish playwright Brian Friel, was nominated for Best Newcomer at the Edinburgh Comedy Awards in 2022. Angelone went on to perform the show in a run at the Soho Theatre in early 2023 and, after another run at the Edinburgh Fringe, released the show on YouTube in September of that year.

Angelone's comedic voice centres on identity and belonging. He describes himself as "always Irish, sometimes Northern Irish, but never British", and highlights the nuances of performing jokes that "ruffle a few feathers, but with warmth and kindness".

Since 2023, Angelone has co-hosted the podcast Mike and Vittorio's Guide to Parenting, alongside fellow Irish comedian Mike Rice. Neither host has children, and the content of the podcast is unrelated to parenting.

In 2024, Angelone began touring his second solo show, Who Do You Think You Are? I am! The show explores themes of identity, and is inspired by ten-pin bowler Pete Weber; the title is derived from Weber's viral celebration of his victory at the 2012 U.S. Open. Angelone has linked the show's exploration of identity and "external perception" to his experience of learning that he may be autistic, he received this diagnosis after his tour ended; he also frequently discusses this topic on his podcast.

Angelone's third show, You Can't Say Nothing Any More, toured throughout 2026.

=== Acting ===
In 2025, he made his acting debut in the short film Rewarding, starring alongside Seána Kerslake.

=== Television appearances ===
In January 2019, Angelone appeared as a contestant on the Channel 4 game show Countdown. In November 2025, he competed on Richard Osman's House of Games and became the third contestant in the show's history to win all five episodes of his week. In March 2026, his appearance on The Last Leg alongside former Conservative minister Penny Mordaunt made headlines when he joked that she was "very supportive of the prosthetics industry" because she had been "promoting on Twitter an arms fair in Saudi Arabia". In August 2026, he appeared as a panelist on Unacceptable.

== Personal life ==
Angelone has been diagnosed with autism and ADHD.

== Critical reception ==
In October 2026, Angelone received public backlash after a rape and incest joke targeted towards English OnlyFans creator and influencer Rebecca Goodwin on the Have a Word podcast, amidst her ongoing sexual assault trial. After the segment gained significant traction on social media platform TikTok, Rape Crisis Northern Ireland and Dublin Rape Crisis Centre both made public statements criticising the remarks, explaining that his comments 'contribute to a culture in which rape and sexual violence can be trivialised' and that 'anyone with a public platform has a responsibility to consider the harm this kind of material can do, to treat sexual violence as a joke betrays a deep lack of understanding of what survivors have lived through'. In response to the controversy, a BBC spokesperson commented ahead of Angelone's appearance on Rewarding, 'we are aware of the concerns that have been raised and are actively considering them'.

Angelone thereafter issued an apology on social media, stating he shouldn’t have made the joke and let his 'need for validation supersede [his] own standards and morals', and he was 'grateful' for people calling him out and 'making me realise where I should’ve done better'. Goodwin stated Angelone’s apology was 'acknowledged but not quite accepted due to the timelines of everything happening', although she appreciated 'the accountability and the lack of an excuse'.

== Filmography ==
=== Television ===
Year	Title	Role	Notes
2026	Rewarding	Francis Cullen	Lead role

=== Stand-up comedy specials ===
Year	Title	Platform
2023	Translations	YouTube
2025	Who Do You Think You Are? I Am!	YouTube
