= IFTA Award for Best Lead Actress – TV Drama =

Irish television industry award

IFTA Award for Lead Actress – Drama
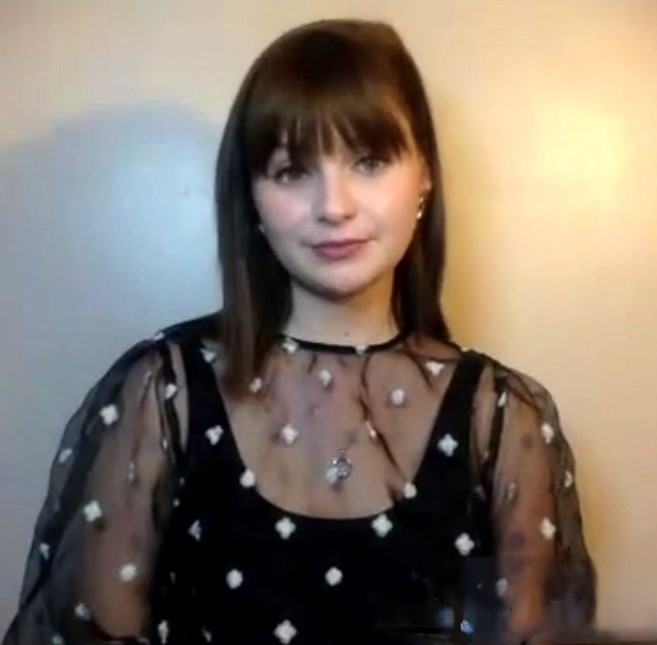
- The 2024 & 2025 recipient: Lola Petticrew
- Awarded for: Best Performance by an Actress in a Leading Role
- Country: Ireland
- Presented by: Irish Film & Television Academy (IFTA)
- First award: 2003
- Most recent winner: Lola Petticrew, Trespasses (2026)
- Website: ifta.ie

The IFTA Award for Lead Actress – Drama is an award presented annually by the Irish Film & Television Academy (IFTA). It has been presented since the 1st Irish Film & Television Awards ceremony in 2003 to an Irish actress who has delivered an outstanding performance in a leading role on television.

The record for most wins is two, held by Clare Dunne, Charlie Murphy and Lola Petticrew. The record for most nominations is eight, held by Caitríona Balfe, who has won the award once. Petticrew is the award's most recent winner, winning the award for the second time for their performance in Trespasses (2025).

== Eligibility ==
The award is exclusively open to Irish actresses. The rules define an Irish person as follows:

- Born in Ireland (32 counties) or
- Have Irish Citizenship or
- Be full-time resident in Ireland (minimum of 3 years)

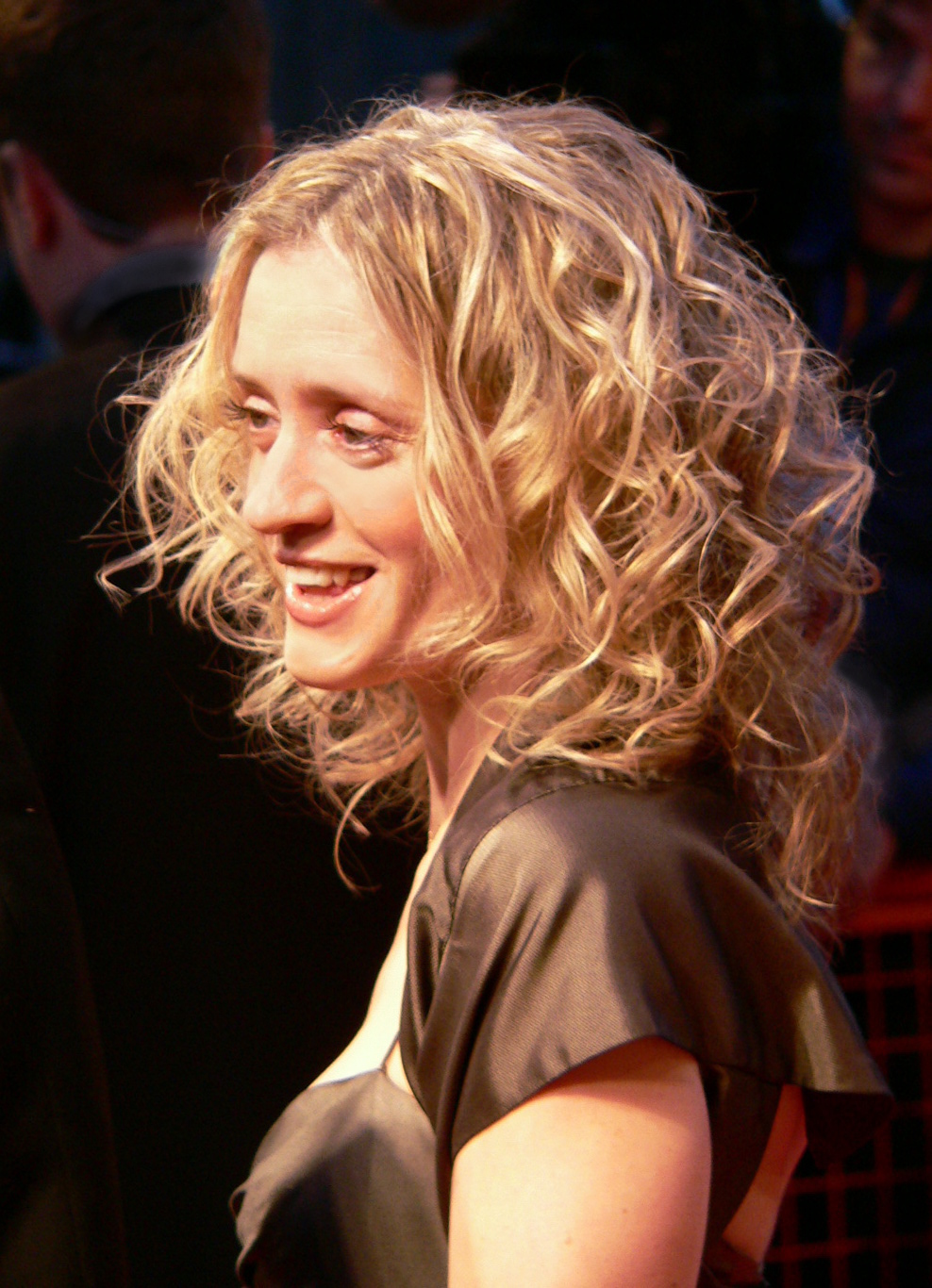
Anne-Marie Duff won for Shameless.

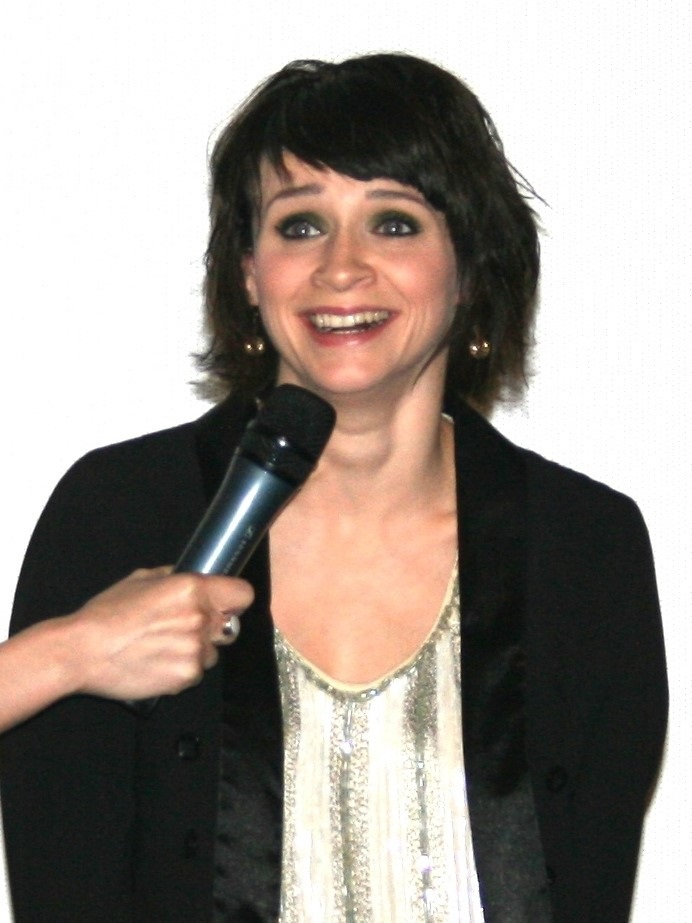
Charlene McKenna won for Raw.

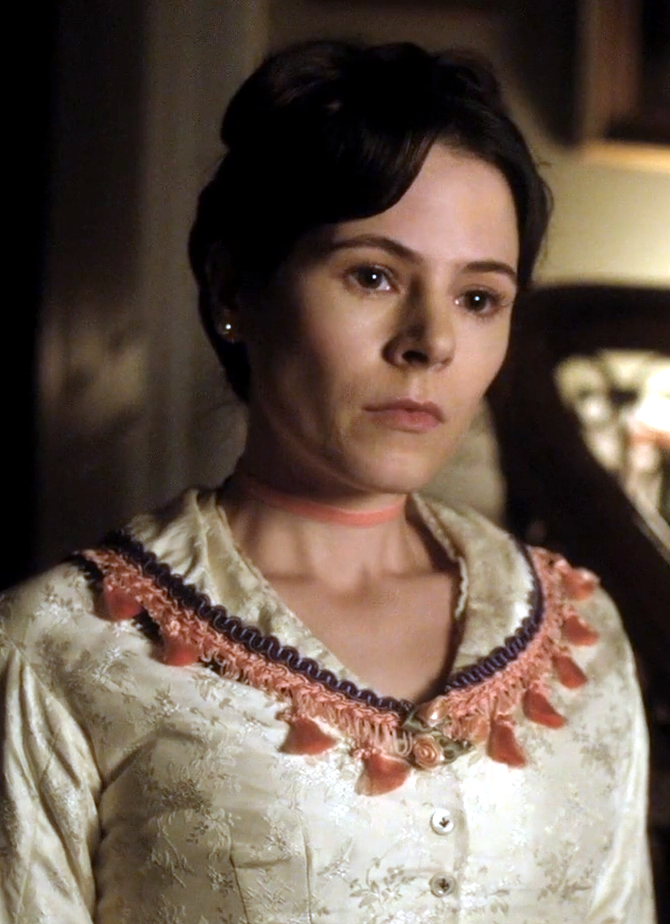
Elaine Cassidy won for Harper's Island (2009).

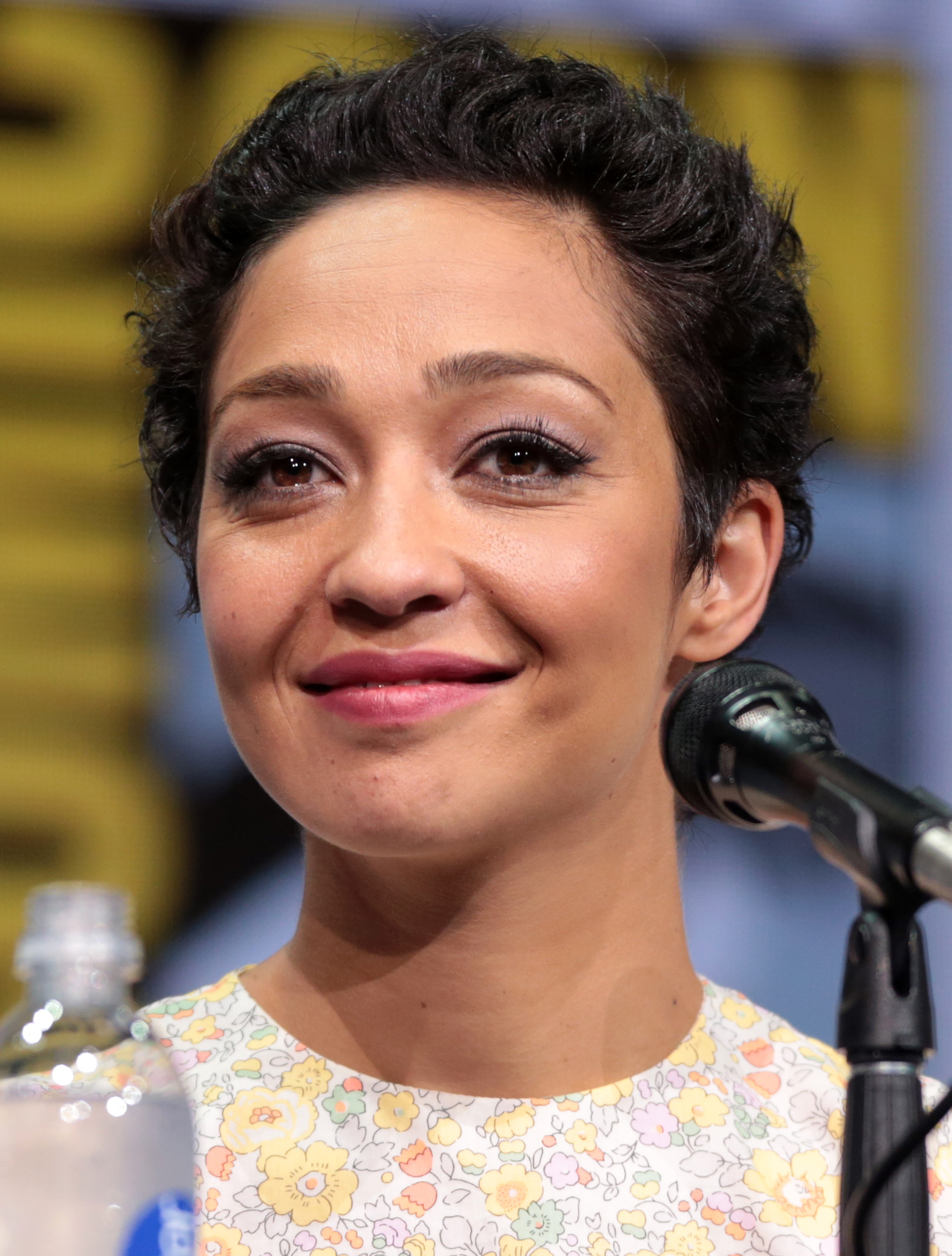
Ruth Negga won for Shirley (2011).

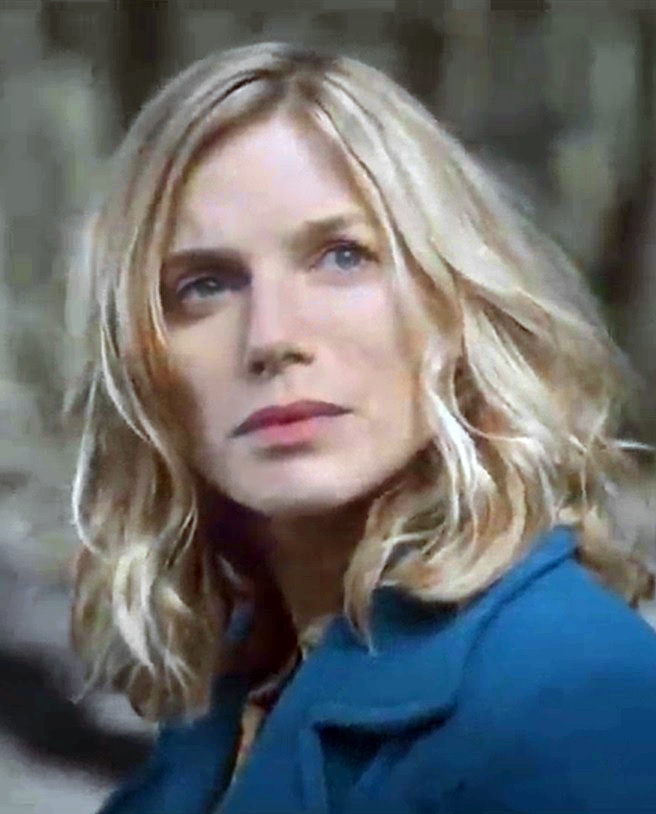
Eva Birthistle won for Amber (2014).

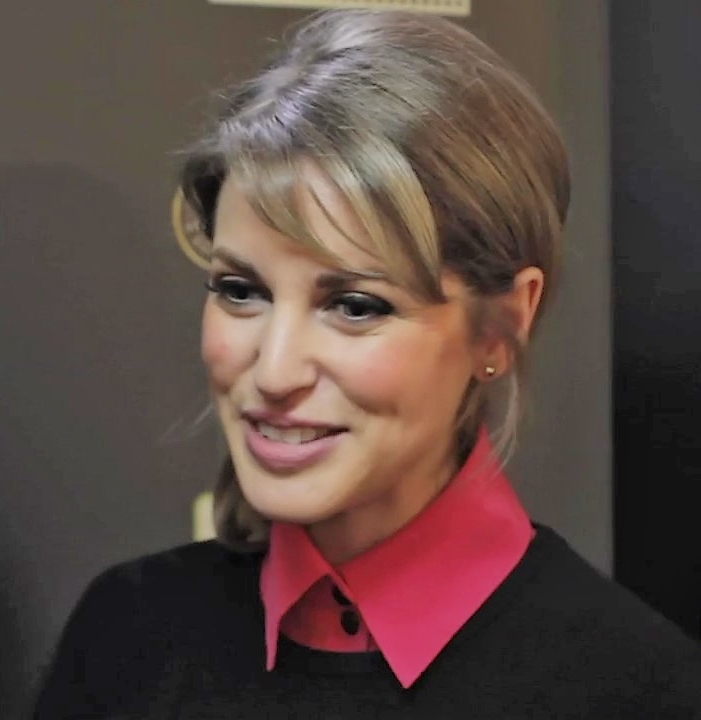
Amy Huberman won for Striking Out.

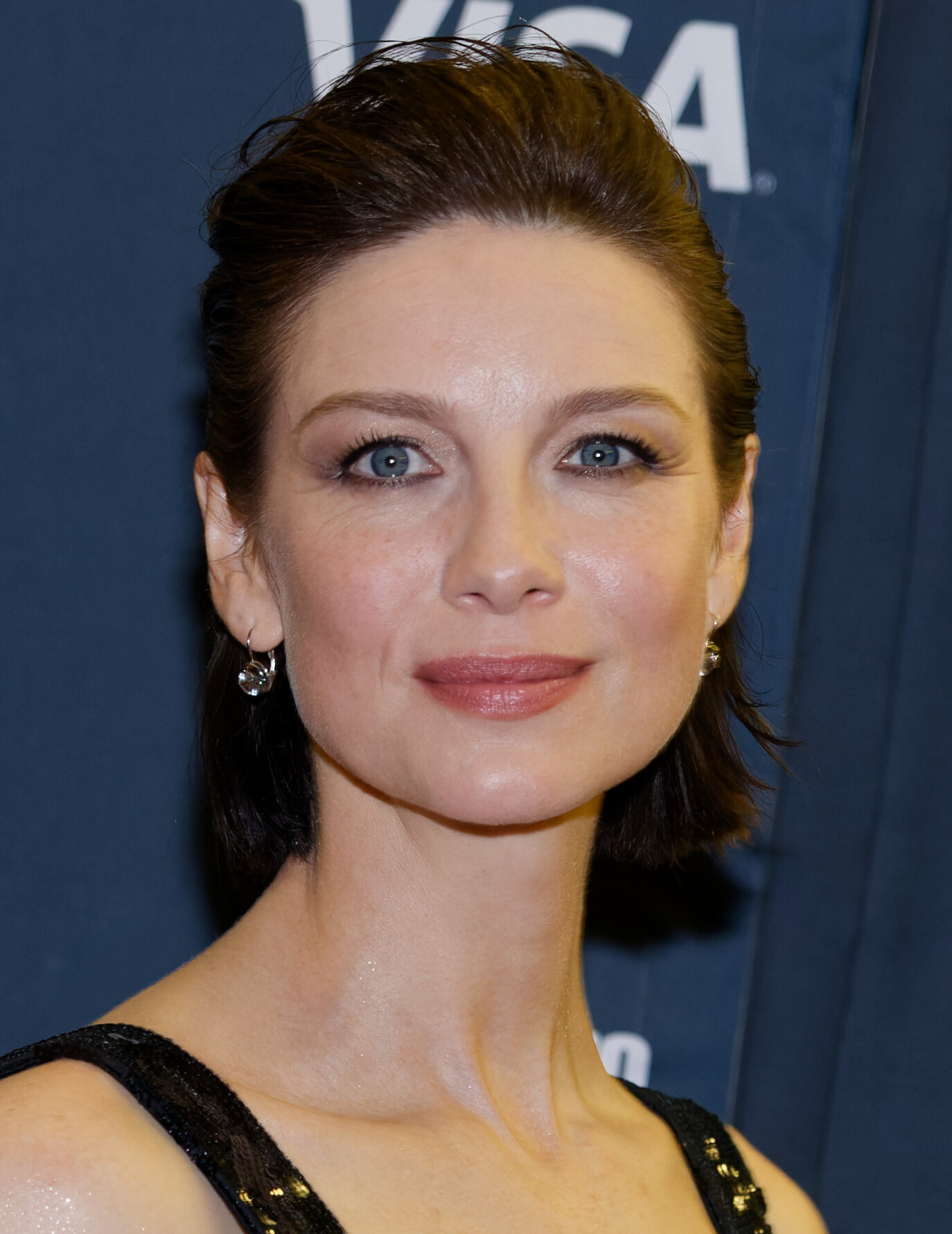
Caitríona Balfe won for Outlander.

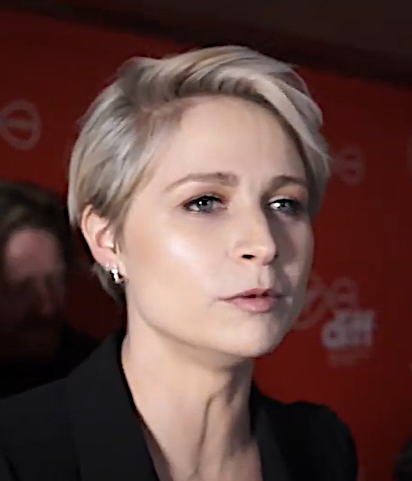
Niamh Algar won for The Virtues (2019).

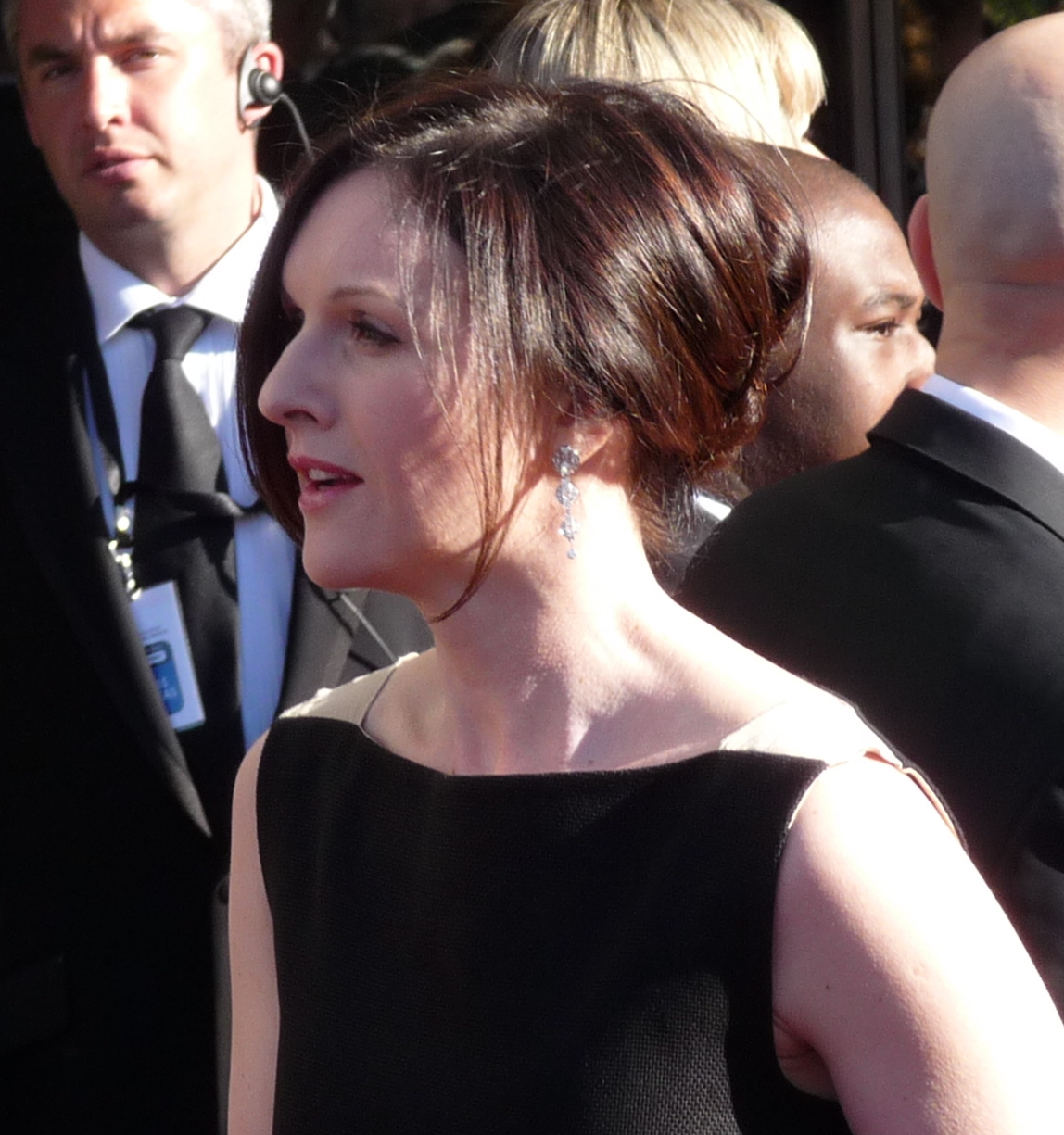
Dervla Kirwan won for Smother.

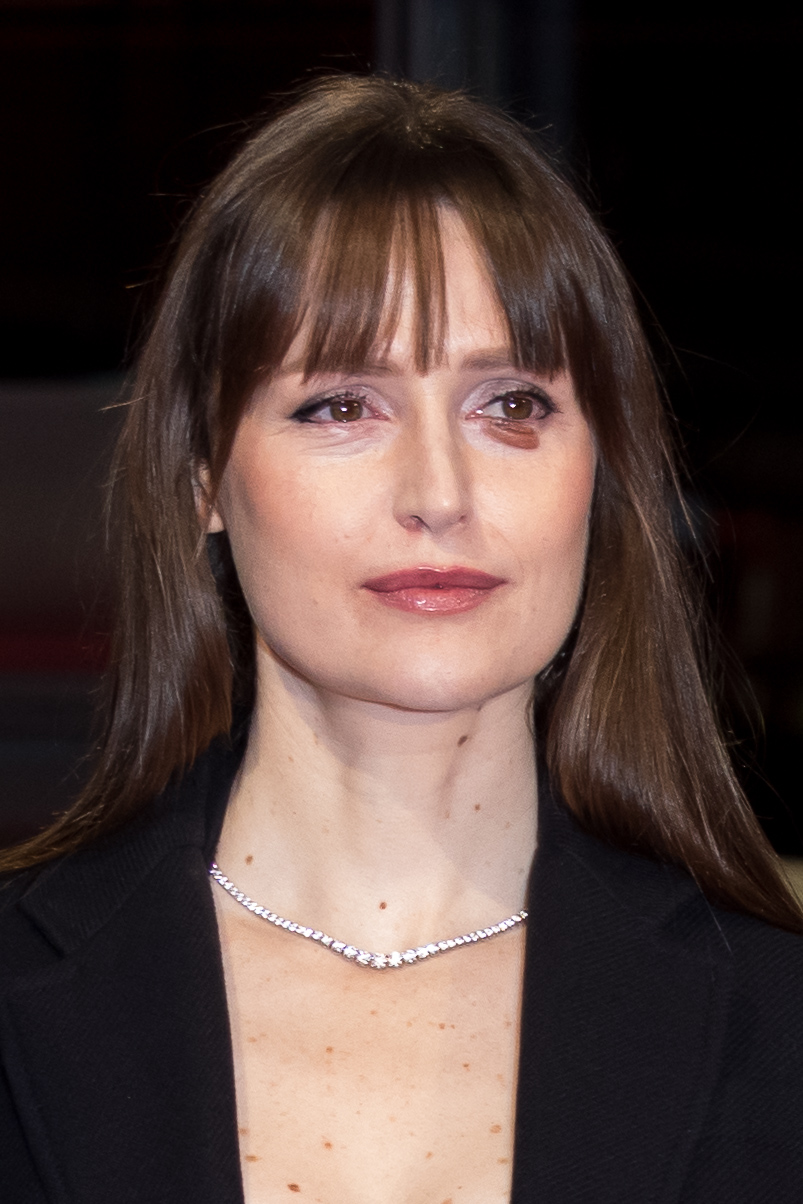
Clare Dunne won twice for Kin.

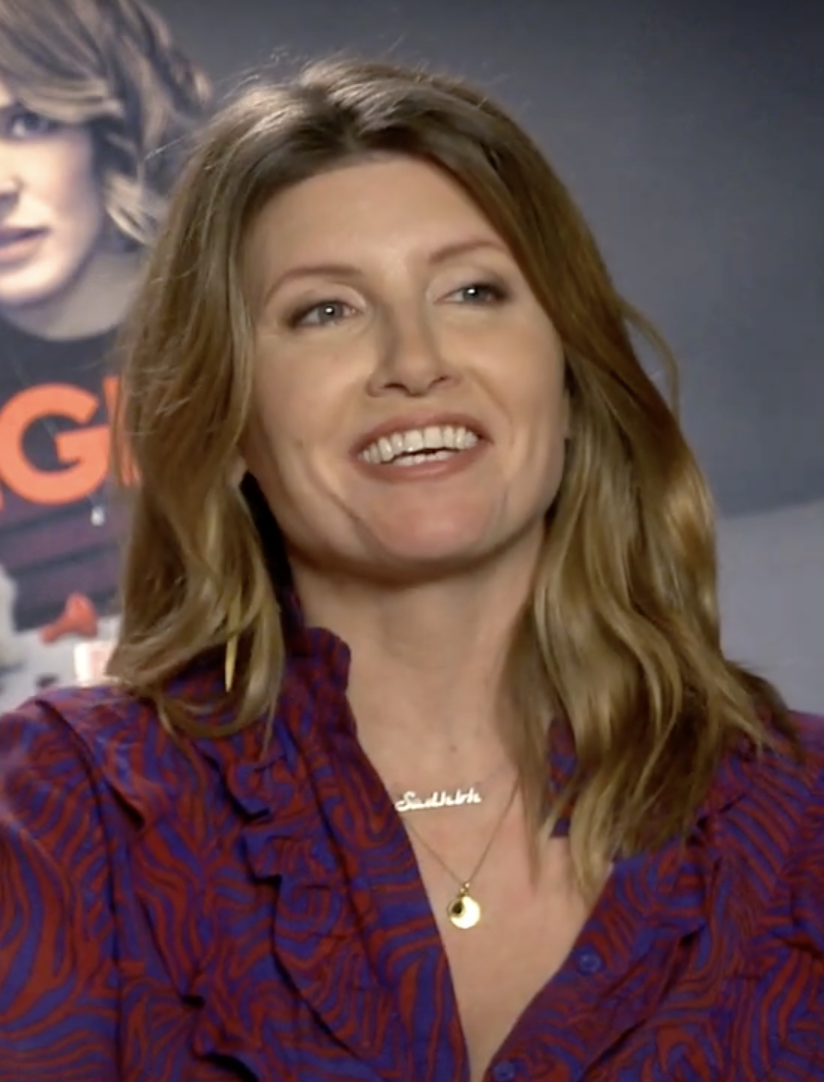
Sharon Horgan won for Bad Sisters.

== Winners and nominees ==
In the following table, the years are listed as the year of television. The first three ceremonies were held at the end of the year, but since the 4th Irish Film & Television Awards the ceremonies have generally been held the following year. As there was no ceremony in 2019, the 16th Irish Film & Television Awards covered a period of two years.

Table key
‡	Indicates the winner

=== 2000s ===
Year	Actress	Programme	Ref.
2003 (1st)	Angeline Ball ‡	Any Time Now	
2003 (1st)	Dearbhla Molloy	Home for Christmas	
2003 (1st)	Joan Sheehy	Ros na Rún	
2004 (2nd)	Anne-Marie Duff ‡	Shameless	
2004 (2nd)	Orla Brady	Proof	
2004 (2nd)	Orla Brady	Servants	
2004 (2nd)	Amanda Burton	Silent Witness	
2004 (2nd)	Niamh Cusack	Too Good to Be True	
2005 (3rd)	Dawn Bradfield ‡	Pure Mule	
2005 (3rd)	Elaine Cassidy	Fingersmith	
2005 (3rd)	Anne-Marie Duff	Shameless	
2005 (3rd)	Aisling O'Sullivan	The Clinic	
2006 (4th)	Ger Ryan ‡	Stardust	
2006 (4th)	Ruth Bradley	Legend	
2006 (4th)	Anne-Marie Duff	The Virgin Queen	
2006 (4th)	Aisling O'Sullivan	The Clinic	
2007 (Note: The Lead Actress Film and TV awards were combined this year. Only nominees from TV are shown on this list.) (5th)	Aisling O'Sullivan ‡	The Clinic	
2007 (5th)	Clíona Ní Chiosáin	Aifric	
2007 (5th)	Fionnula Flanagan	Brotherhood	
2007 (5th)	Siobhan Shanahan	Prosperity	
2008 (6th)	Charlene McKenna ‡	Raw	
2008 (6th)	Elaine Cassidy	Little White Lie	
2008 (6th)	Charlene McKenna	Whistleblower	
2008 (6th)	Deirdre O'Kane	BitterSweet	
2009 (7th)	Elaine Cassidy ‡	Harper's Island	
2009 (7th)	Ruth Bradley	Rásaí na Gaillimhe	
2009 (7th)	Michelle Fairley	Best: His Mother's Son	
2009 (7th)	Charlene McKenna	Pure Mule: The Last Weekend	

=== 2010s ===
Year	Actress	Programme	Ref.
2010 (Note: The Lead Actress Film and TV awards were combined this year as IFTA had “not received sufficient submissions” to have separate awards. Only nominees from TV are shown on this list.) (8th)	Ruth Bradley	Love/Hate	
2010 (8th)	Orla Brady	Mistresses	
2010 (8th)	Sarah Flood	Fair City	
2010 (8th)	Charlene McKenna	Raw	
2011 (9th)	Ruth Negga ‡	Shirley	
2011 (9th)	Maria Doyle Kennedy	Corp + Anam	
2011 (9th)	Michelle Fairley	Game of Thrones	
2011 (9th)	Aisling O'Sullivan	Raw	
2012 (10th)	Charlie Murphy ‡	Love/Hate	
2012 (10th)	Orla Brady	Sinbad	
2012 (10th)	Carrie Crowley	Rásaí na Gaillimhe	
2012 (10th)	Amy Huberman	Threesome	
2013 (11th)	Eva Birthistle ‡	Amber	
2013 (11th)	Charlie Murphy	Love/Hate	
2013 (11th)	Mary Murray	Love/Hate	
2013 (11th)	Deirdre O'Kane	Moone Boy	
2014 (12th)	Charlie Murphy ‡	Love/Hate	
2014 (12th)	Caitríona Balfe	Outlander	
2014 (12th)	Michelle Beamish	An Bronntanas	
2014 (12th)	Maria Doyle Kennedy	Corp + Anam	
2015 (13th)	Ruth Bradley ‡	Rebellion	
2015 (13th)	Caitríona Balfe	Outlander	
2015 (13th)	Elaine Cassidy	No Offence	
2015 (13th)	Sarah Greene	Rebellion	
2015 (13th)	Catherine Walker	Critical	
2016 (14th)	Amy Huberman ‡	Striking Out	
2016 (14th)	Caitríona Balfe	Outlander	
2016 (14th)	Elaine Cassidy	No Offence	
2016 (14th)	Anne-Marie Duff	Murder: The Lost Weekend	
2016 (14th)	Ruth Negga	Preacher	
2017 (15th)	Caitríona Balfe ‡	Outlander	
2017 (15th)	Elaine Cassidy	Acceptable Risk	
2017 (15th)	Denise Gough	Paula	
2017 (15th)	Amy Huberman	Striking Out	
2017 (15th)	Ruth Negga	Preacher	
2018/19 (16th)	Niamh Algar ‡	The Virtues	
2018/19 (16th)	Caitríona Balfe	Outlander	
2018/19 (16th)	Jessie Buckley	The Woman in White	
2018/19 (16th)	Sarah Greene	Dublin Murders	
2018/19 (16th)	Ruth Negga	Preacher	
2018/19 (16th)	Ann Skelly	Death and Nightingales	

=== 2020s ===
Year	Actress	Programme	Ref.
2020/21 (17th)	Dervla Kirwan ‡	Smother	
2020/21 (17th)	Niamh Algar	Raised by Wolves	
2020/21 (17th)	Aisling Franciosi	Black Narcissus	
2020/21 (17th)	Eve Hewson	Behind Her Eyes	
2020/21 (17th)	Catherine Walker	The Deceived	
2021/22 (18th)	Clare Dunne ‡	Kin	
2021/22 (18th)	Niamh Algar	Deceit	
2021/22 (18th)	Angeline Ball	Hidden Assets	
2021/22 (18th)	Sinéad Keenan	Three Families	
2021/22 (18th)	Dervla Kirwan	Smother	
2022/23 (19th)	Sharon Horgan ‡	Bad Sisters	
2022/23 (19th)	Caitríona Balfe	Outlander	
2022/23 (19th)	Roisin Gallagher	The Dry	
2022/23 (19th)	Dervla Kirwan	Smother	
2022/23 (19th)	Siobhán McSweeney	Holding	
2022/23 (19th)	Alison Oliver	Conversations with Friends	
2023 (20th)	Clare Dunne ‡	Kin	
2023 (20th)	Niamh Algar	Malpractice	
2023 (20th)	Caitríona Balfe	Outlander	
2023 (20th)	Siobhán Cullen	Obituary	
2023 (20th)	Sharon Horgan	Best Interests	
2023 (20th)	Elva Trill	Northern Lights	
2024 (21st)	Lola Petticrew ‡	Say Nothing	
2024 (21st)	Elaine Cassidy	Sanctuary: A Witch's Tale	
2024 (21st)	Nicola Coughlan	Bridgerton	
2024 (21st)	Siobhán Cullen	Bodkin	
2024 (21st)	Roisin Gallagher	The Dry	
2024 (21st)	Sharon Horgan	Bad Sisters	
2025 (22d)	Lola Petticrew ‡	Trespasses	
2025 (22d)	Niamh Algar	The Iris Affair	
2025 (22d)	Caitríona Balfe	Outlander	
2025 (22d)	Siobhán Cullen	Obituary	
2025 (22d)	Louisa Harland	The Walsh Sisters	
2025 (22d)	Nora-Jane Noone	Hidden Assets	

== Multiple awards and nominations ==
The following individuals have received two or more Lead Actress awards:

Wins	Actress	Nominations
2	Charlie Murphy	3
2	Clare Dunne	2
2	Lola Petticrew	2

The following individuals have received two or more Lead Actress nominations:

Nominations	Actress
8	Caitríona Balfe
7	Elaine Cassidy
5	Niamh Algar
4	Ruth Bradley
4	Orla Brady
4	Anne-Marie Duff
4	Charlene McKenna
4	Ruth Negga
4	Aisling O'Sullivan
3	Siobhán Cullen
3	Sharon Horgan
3	Amy Huberman
3	Dervla Kirwan
3	Charlie Murphy
2	Angeline Ball
2	Maria Doyle Kennedy
2	Clare Dunne
2	Michelle Fairley
2	Roisin Gallagher
2	Sarah Greene
2	Deirdre O'Kane
2	Lola Petticrew
2	Catherine Walker
