= IFTA Award for Best Supporting Actress – TV Drama =

Irish television industry award

IFTA Award for Supporting Actress – Drama
- Awarded for: Best Performance by an Actress in a Supporting Role
- Country: Ireland
- Presented by: Irish Film & Television Academy (IFTA)
- First award: 2003
- Most recent winner: Alison Oliver, Task (2026)
- Website: ifta.ie

The IFTA Award for Supporting Actress – Drama is an award presented annually by the Irish Film & Television Academy (IFTA). It has been presented since the 3rd Irish Film & Television Awards ceremony in 2005 to an Irish actress who has delivered an outstanding performance in a supporting role on television. For the first and second ceremonies, supporting performances for film and television were combined into one category.

The record for most wins is four, held by Maria Doyle Kennedy. The record for most nominations is five, held by Ruth Negga. Alison Oliver is the award's most recent winner, for her role in Task.

== Eligibility ==
The award is exclusively open to Irish actresses. The rules define an Irish person as follows:

- Born in Ireland (32 counties) or
- Have Irish Citizenship or
- Be full-time resident in Ireland (minimum of 3 years)

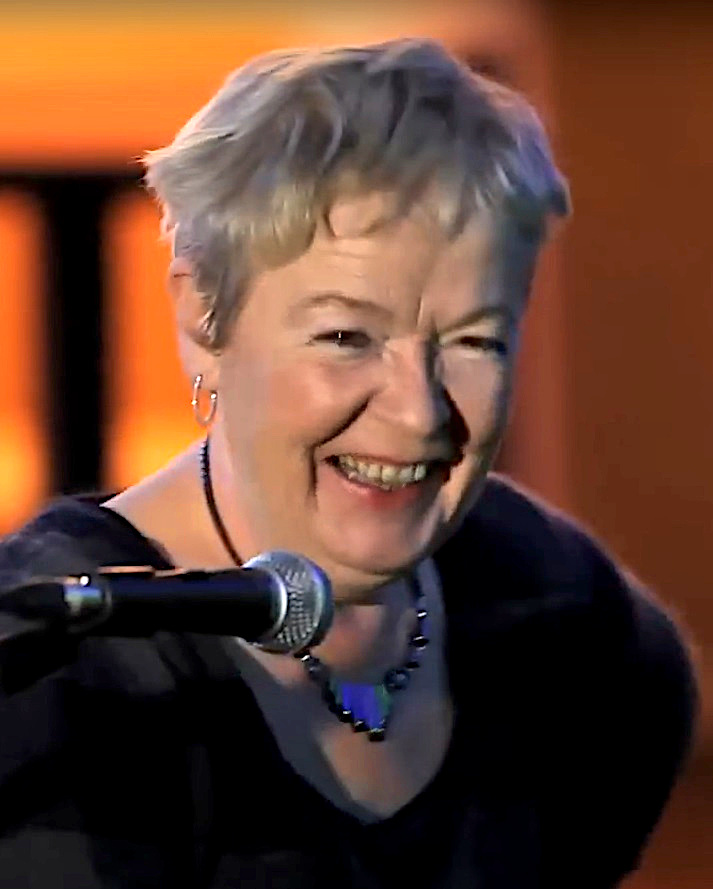
Ruth McCabe won twice, for Any Time Now and Single-Handed.

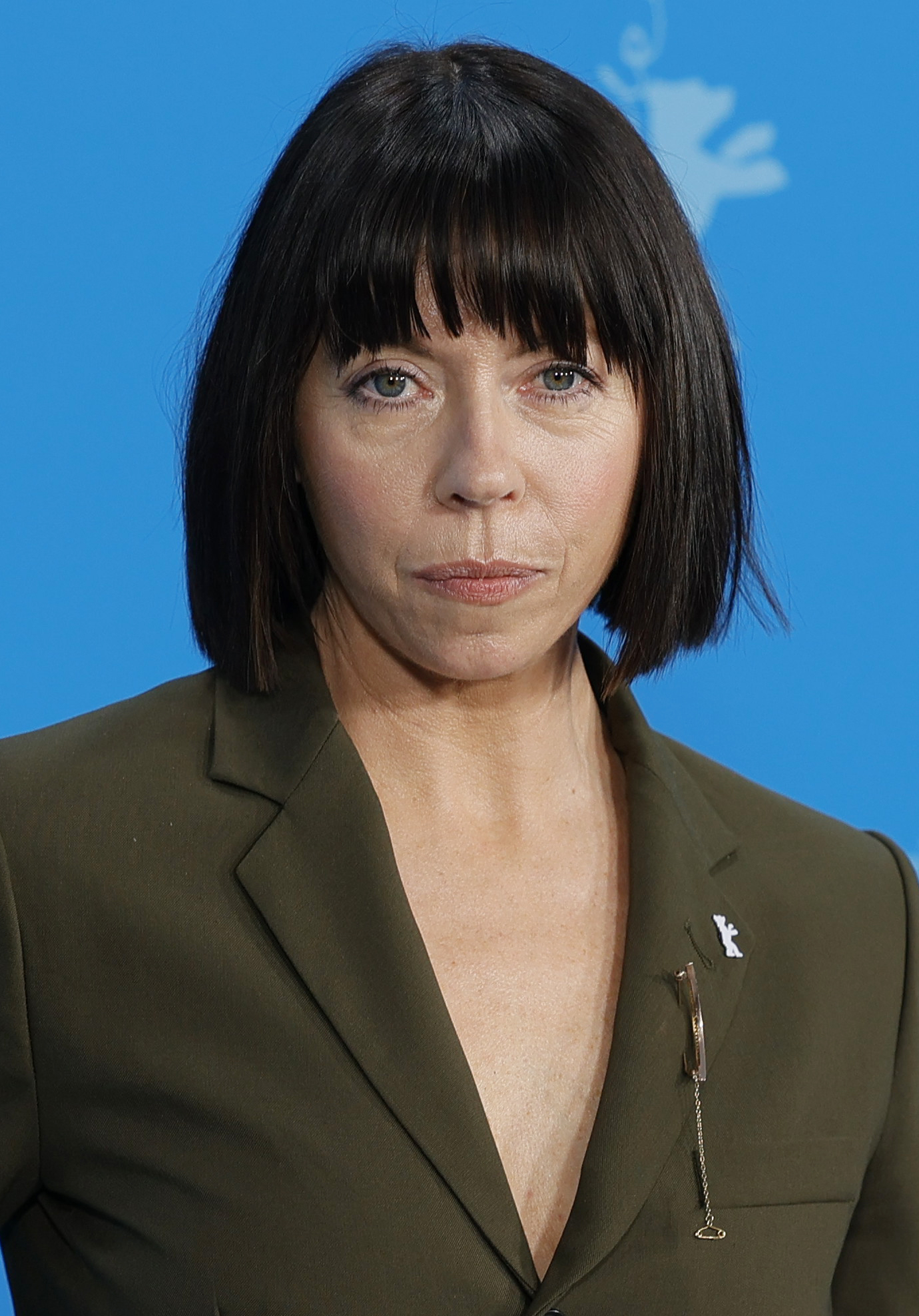
Eileen Walsh won for Pure Mule.

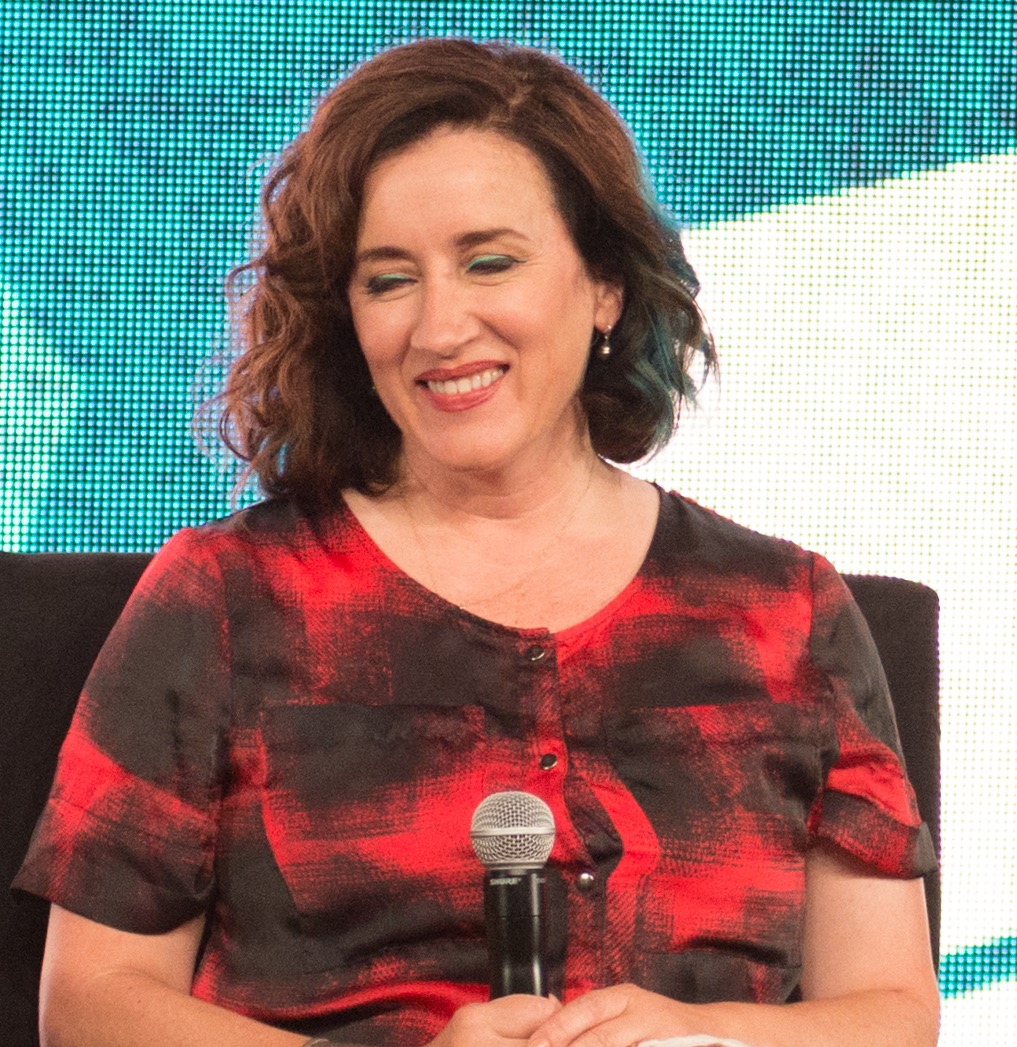
Maria Doyle Kennedy won four times; twice for The Tudors and twice for Kin.

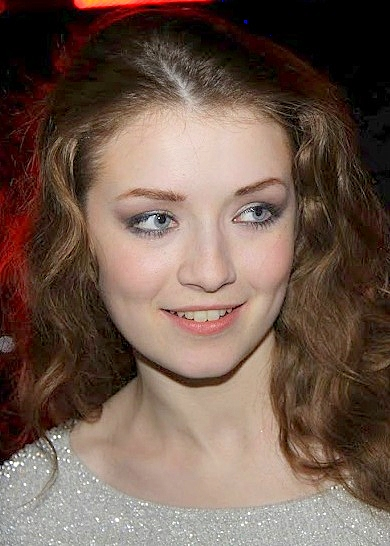
Sarah Bolger won for The Tudors.

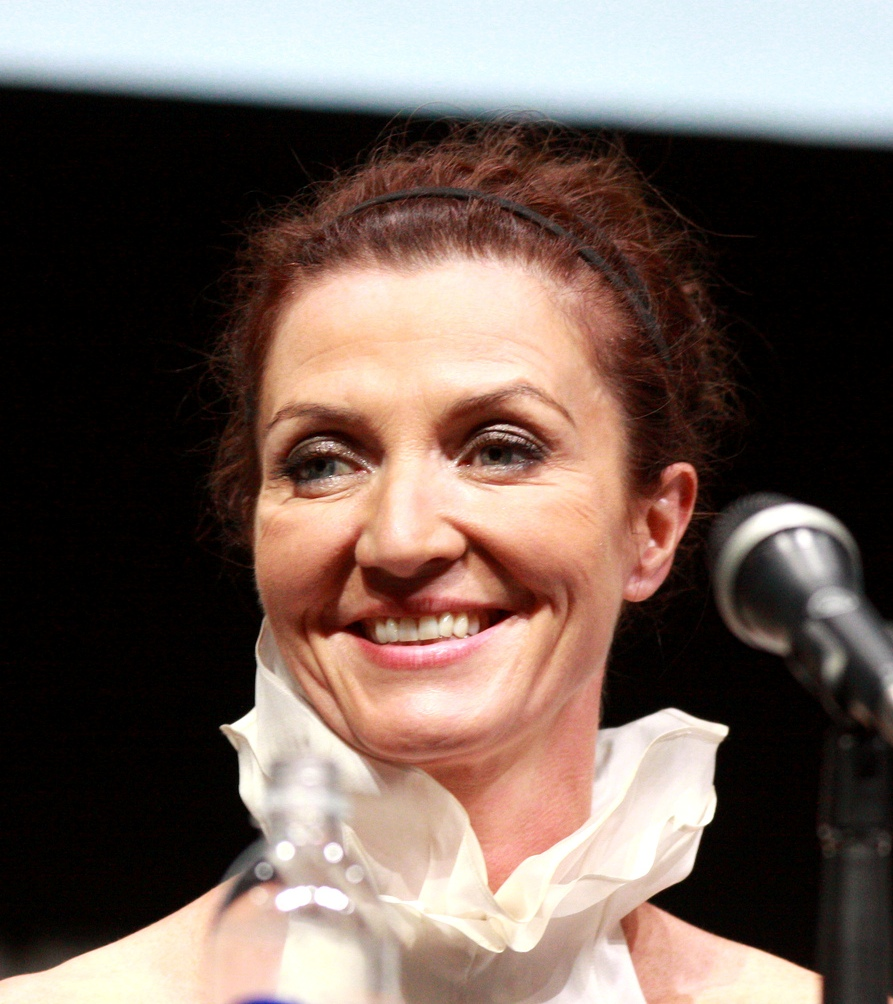
Michelle Fairley won for Game of Thrones.

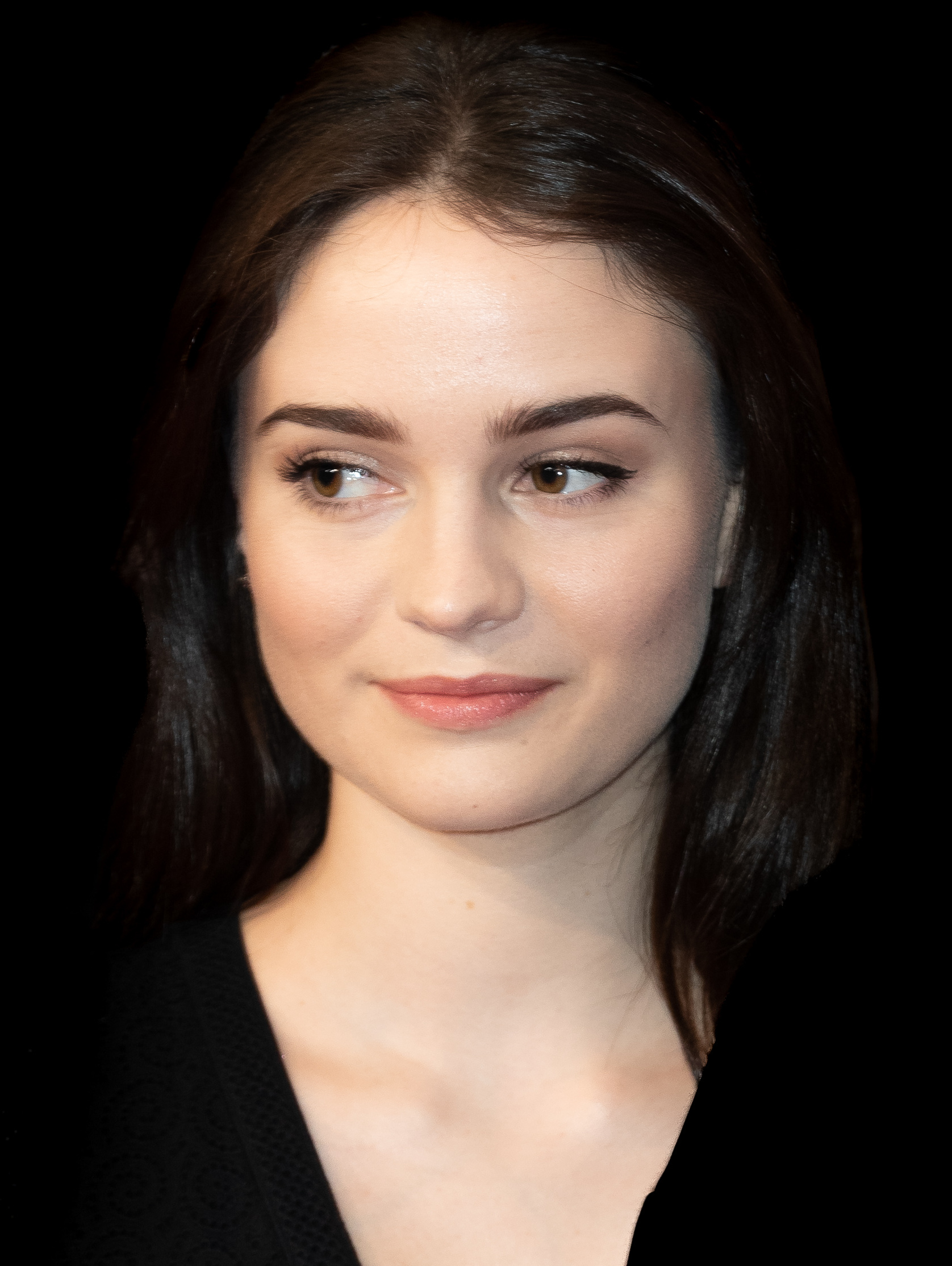
Aisling Franciosi won for The Fall.

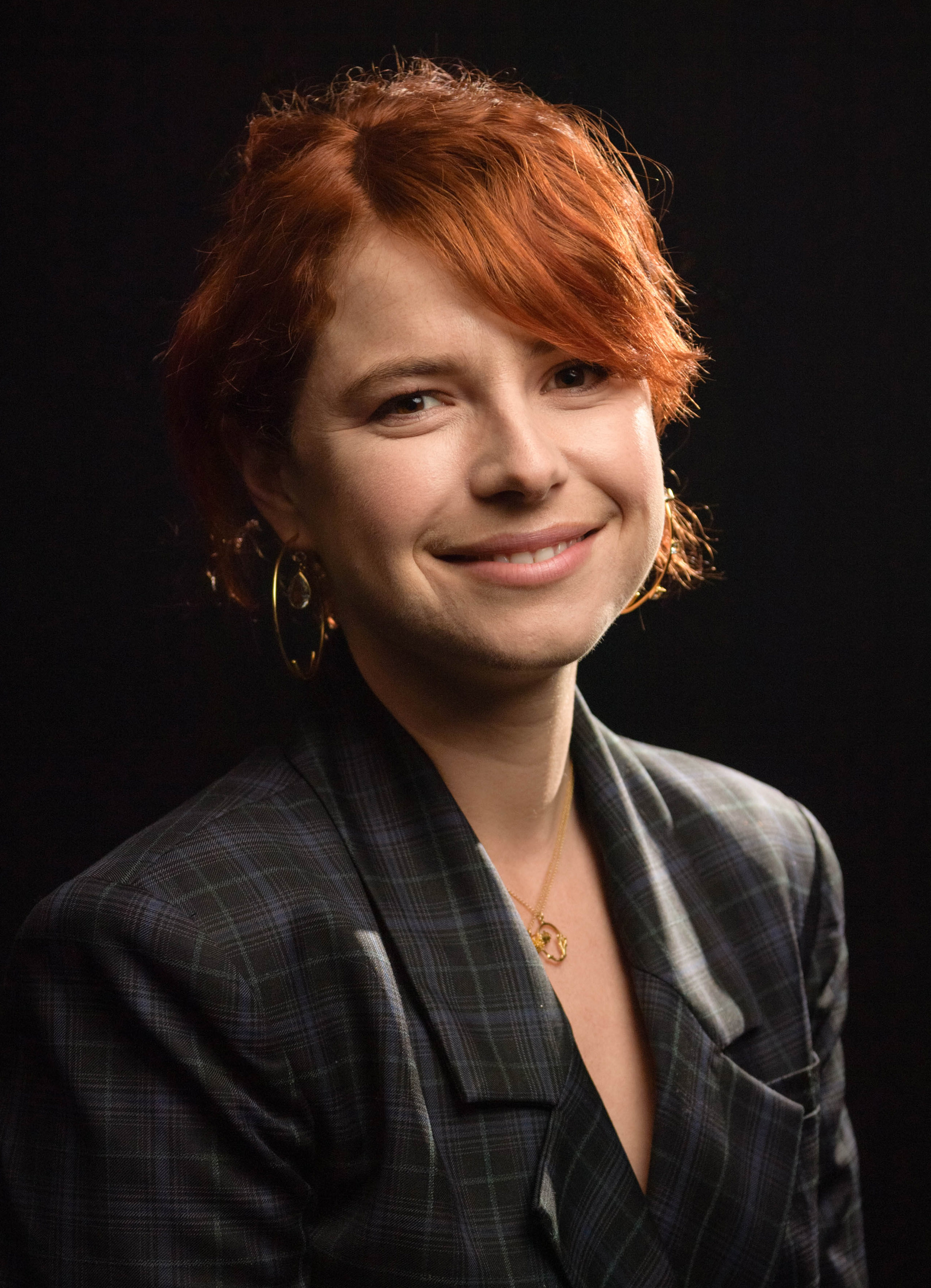
Jessie Buckley won for Chernobyl (2019).

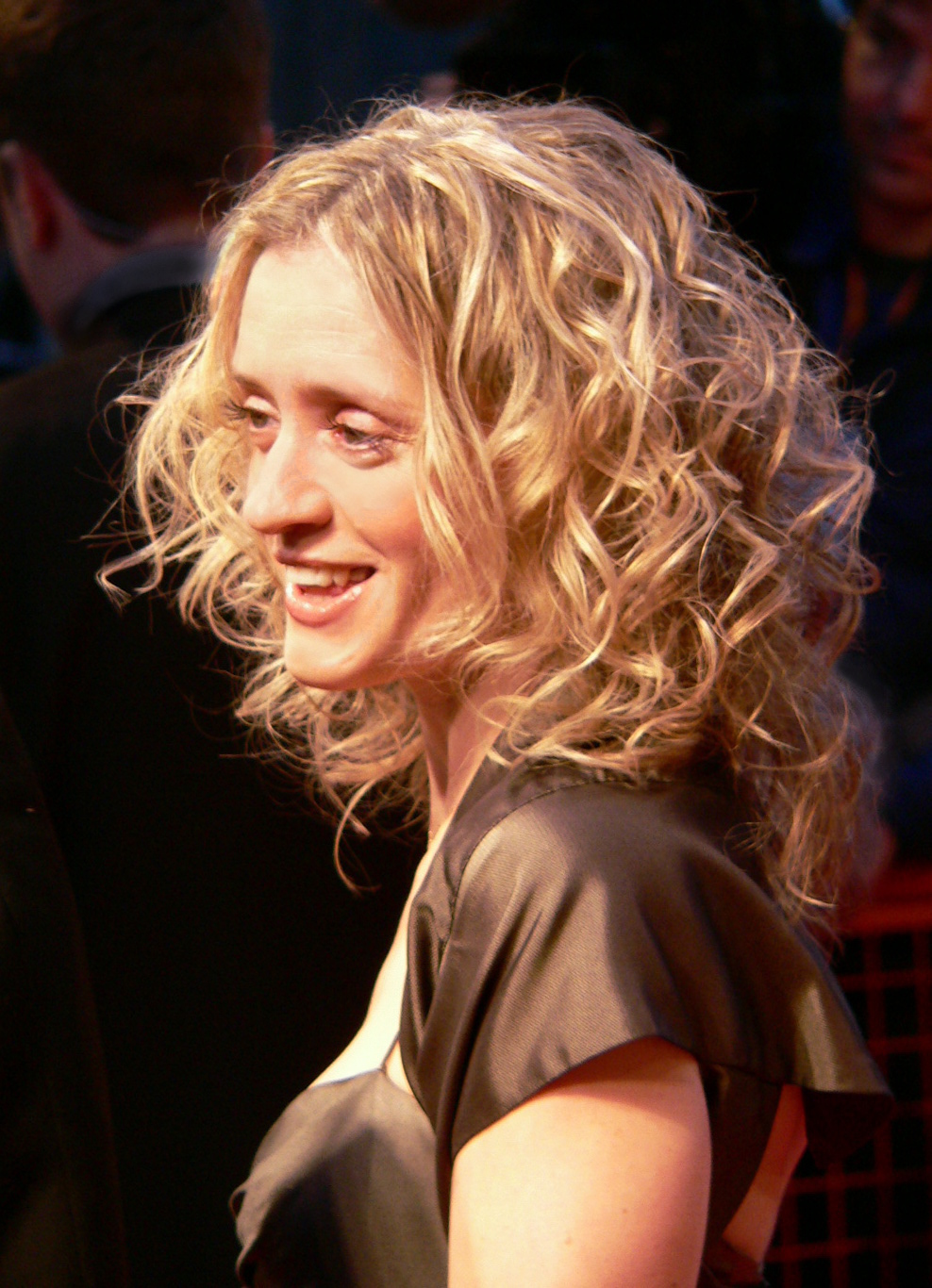
Anne-Marie Duff won for Bad Sisters.

== Winners and nominees ==
In the following table, the years are listed as the year of television. The first three ceremonies were held at the end of the year, but since the 4th Irish Film & Television Awards the ceremonies have generally been held the following year. As there was no ceremony in 2019, the 16th Irish Film & Television Awards covered a period of two years.

Table key
‡	Indicates the winner

=== 2000s ===
Year	Actress	Programme	Ref.
2003 (Note: For the first two ceremonies, supporting performances for film and television were combined into one category. Only nominees from television are included in this list.) (1st)	Ruth McCabe ‡	Any Time Now	
2004 (2nd)	Susan Lynch	Bodies	
2004 (2nd)	Rachel Pilkington	The Clinic	
2005 (3rd)	Eileen Walsh ‡	Pure Mule	
2005 (3rd)	Eva Birthistle	The Baby War	
2005 (3rd)	Tina Kellegher	Showbands	
2005 (3rd)	Eleanor Methven	Love is the Drug	
2006 (4th)	Ruth Bradley ‡	Stardust	
2006 (4th)	Leigh Arnold	The Clinic	
2006 (4th)	Gemma Craven	The Clinic	
2006 (4th)	Tina Kellegher	Showbands	
2007 (5th)	Maria Doyle Kennedy ‡	The Tudors	
2007 (5th)	Dawn Bradfield	The Clinic	
2007 (5th)	Fionnula Flanagan	Paddywhackery	
2007 (5th)	Amy Huberman	The Clinic	
2008 (6th)	Maria Doyle Kennedy ‡	The Tudors	
2008 (6th)	Orla Brady	Mistresses	
2008 (6th)	Hilda Fay	Whistleblower	
2008 (6th)	Amy Huberman	The Clinic	
2009 (7th)	Sarah Bolger ‡	The Tudors	
2009 (7th)	Dawn Bradfield	Pure Mule: The Last Weekend	
2009 (7th)	Amy Huberman	The Clinic	
2009 (7th)	Tatiana Ouliankina	Belonging to Laura	

=== 2010s ===
Year	Actress	Programme	Ref.
2010 (8th)	Ruth McCabe ‡	Single-Handed	
2010 (8th)	Sarah Bolger	The Tudors	
2010 (8th)	Dervla Kirwan	The Silence	
2010 (8th)	Ruth Negga	Love/Hate	
2011 (9th)	Denise McCormack ‡	Love/Hate	
2011 (9th)	Eva Birthistle	Strike Back	
2011 (9th)	Bronagh Gallagher	The Field of Blood	
2011 (9th)	Ruth Negga	Misfits	
2012 (10th)	Susan Loughnane ‡	Love/Hate	
2012 (10th)	Cathy Belton	Roy	
2012 (10th)	Deirdre O'Kane	Moone Boy	
2012 (10th)	Ruth Negga	Secret State	
2013 (11th)	Michelle Fairley ‡	Game of Thrones	
2013 (11th)	Elaine Cassidy	The Paradise	
2013 (11th)	Caoilfhionn Dunne	Love/Hate	
2013 (11th)	Victoria Smurfit	Dracula	
2014 (12th)	Aisling Franciosi ‡	The Fall	
2014 (12th)	Charlotte Bradley	An Bronntanas	
2014 (12th)	Charlie Murphy	The Village	
2014 (12th)	Mary Murray	Love/Hate	
2015 (13th)	Sarah Greene ‡	Penny Dreadful	
2015 (13th)	Michelle Fairley	Rebellion	
2015 (13th)	Paula Malcomson	Ray Donovan	
2015 (13th)	Ruth Negga	Marvel's Agents of S.H.I.E.L.D.	
2015 (13th)	Victoria Smurfit	Once Upon a Time	
2016 (14th)	Charlie Murphy ‡	Happy Valley	
2016 (14th)	Ruth Bradley	Humans	
2016 (14th)	Sinéad Cusack	Call the Midwife	
2016 (14th)	Dominique McElligott	House of Cards	
2016 (14th)	Charlene McKenna	Ripper Street	
2017 (15th)	Charlie Murphy ‡	Peaky Blinders	
2017 (15th)	Angeline Ball	Acceptable Risk	
2017 (15th)	Eva Birthistle	The Last Kingdom	
2017 (15th)	Jessie Buckley	Taboo	
2017 (15th)	Genevieve O'Reilly	Tin Star	
2018/19 (16th)	Jessie Buckley ‡	Chernobyl	
2018/19 (16th)	Niamh Algar	Pure	
2018/19 (16th)	Helen Behan	The Virtues	
2018/19 (16th)	Ruth Bradley	Guilt	
2018/19 (16th)	Ingrid Craigie	Blood	
2018/19 (16th)	Fiona Shaw	Killing Eve	

=== 2020s ===
Year	Actress	Programme	Ref.
2020/21 (17th)	Sarah Greene ‡	Normal People	
2020/21 (17th)	Fiona Shaw	Killing Eve	
2020/21 (17th)	Gemma-Leah Devereux	Smother	
2020/21 (17th)	Nicola Coughlan	Bridgerton	
2020/21 (17th)	Seána Kerslake	Smother	
2021/22 (18th)	Maria Doyle Kennedy ‡	Kin	
2021/22 (18th)	Cathy Belton	Hidden Assets	
2021/22 (18th)	Justine Mitchell	Smother	
2021/22 (18th)	Lola Petticrew	Three Families	
2021/22 (18th)	Simone Kirby	Hidden Assets	
2022/23 (19th)	Anne-Marie Duff ‡	Bad Sisters	
2022/23 (19th)	Eva Birthistle	Bad Sisters	
2022/23 (19th)	Brenda Fricker	The Dry	
2022/23 (19th)	Sarah Greene	Bad Sisters	
2022/23 (19th)	Eve Hewson	Bad Sisters	
2022/23 (19th)	Genevieve O'Reilly	Andor	
2023 (20th)	Maria Doyle Kennedy ‡	Kin	
2023 (20th)	Niamh Algar	Culprits	
2023 (20th)	Cathy Belton	Hidden Assets	
2023 (20th)	Hilda Fay	The Woman in the Wall	
2023 (20th)	Fionnula Flanagan	Sisters	
2023 (20th)	Danielle Galligan	Obituary	
2024 (21st)	Hazel Doupe ‡	Say Nothing	
2024 (21st)	Siobhán Cullen	The Dry	
2024 (21st)	Eve Hewson	Bad Sisters	
2024 (21st)	Ruth Negga	Presumed Innocent	
2024 (21st)	Fiona Shaw	Bad Sisters	
2024 (21st)	Victoria Smurfit	Rivals	
2025 (22d)	Alison Oliver ‡	Task	
2025 (22d)	Ruth Bradley	Slow Horses	
2025 (22d)	Katherine Devlin	Blue Lights	
2025 (22d)	Danielle Galligan	House of Guinness	
2025 (22d)	Cathy Belton	Hidden Assets	
2025 (22d)	Genevieve O'Reilly	Andor	

== Multiple awards and nominations ==
The following individuals have received two or more Supporting Actress awards:

Wins	Actress	Nominations
4	Maria Doyle Kennedy	4
2	Sarah Greene	3
2	Charlie Murphy	3
2	Ruth McCabe	2

The following individuals have received two or more Supporting Actress nominations:

Nominations	Actress
5	Ruth Negga
4	Cathy Belton
4	Eva Birthistle
4	Ruth Bradley
4	Maria Doyle Kennedy
3	Sarah Greene
3	Amy Huberman
3	Charlie Murphy
3	Genevieve O'Reilly
3	Fiona Shaw
3	Victoria Smurfit
2	Niamh Algar
2	Sarah Bolger
2	Dawn Bradfield
2	Jessie Buckley
2	Michelle Fairley
2	Hilda Fay
2	Fionnula Flanagan
2	Danielle Galligan
2	Eve Hewson
2	Tina Kellegher
2	Ruth McCabe
