= Danielle Galligan =

Irish actress and theatre maker (born 1992)

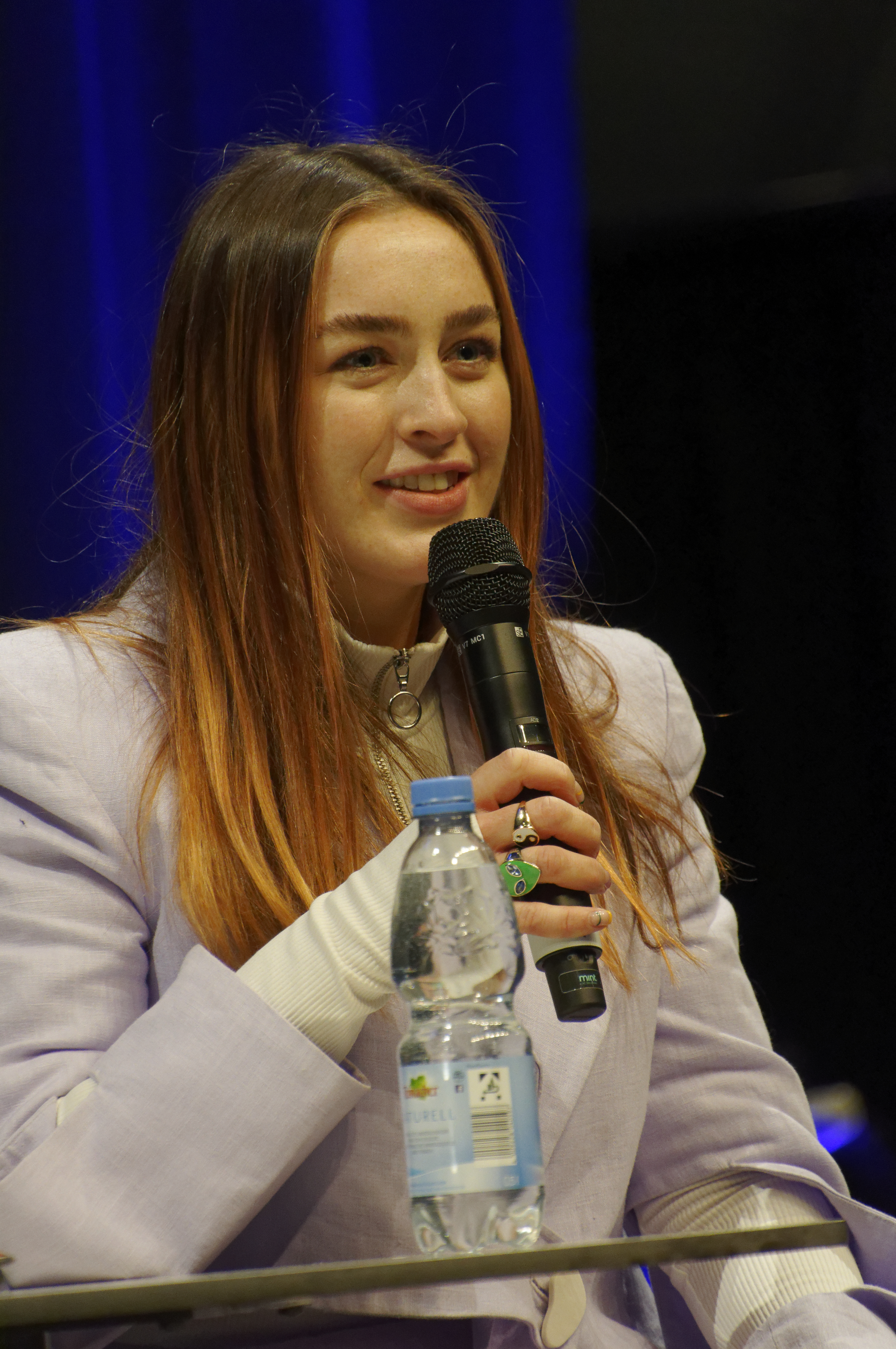
- Galligan at the 2021 Comic-Con Germany
- Born: 1 December 1992 (age 33); Dublin, Ireland
- Education: The Lir Academy
- Occupations: Actress, theatre maker
- Years active: 2015–present

Danielle Galligan (born 1 December 1992) is an Irish actress and theatre maker. On television, she is known for her roles in the Netflix series Shadow and Bone (2021–2023) and House of Guinness (2025), and the RTÉ series Obituary (2023) and The Walsh Sisters (2025). Her films include Lakelands (2022).

== Early life and education ==
Galligan is from Rathfarnham, a suburb in South Dublin. Her mother Lorraine is a beauty therapist who runs a salon and beauty school.

Galligan attended Loreto High School Beaufort. She was a member of Ann Kavanagh's Young People's Theatre from 2005 to 2011 and was awarded the Ena Burke bursary for the Betty Ann Norton Theatre School. She then studied Drama and Theatre studies at Trinity College Dublin and trained in Acting at The Lir Academy, graduating with a bachelor's degree in 2015.

== Career ==
=== Theatre ===
After graduating from The Lir, Galligan began her career in stage productions such as The Train with Rough Magic. In 2017, she was in All Honey and played the titular role in The Grimm Tale of Cinderella.

In 2018, Galligan played the lead opposite Tom Moran in his play Lyrics and Cinnamon in We Can't Have Monkeys in the House at the New Theatre. She reprised the latter role at the 2019 Young Curators Festival. She featured as the singer in Gavin Kostick's 12 Christmas Poems that December.

==== Theatre making ====
Galligan had a FUEL theatre making residency and workshop alongside Fionnuala Gygax and Ailish Leavy for Hostel 16 at the Druid Theatre.

In 2018, she co-founded Chaos Factory, an experimental theatre company alongside Gygax, Venetia Bowe, and Rachel Bergin. They debuted with a production titled Kiss Kiss Slap, which featured in the 2018 Dublin Fringe Festival. Their second project, MorphMe, premiered in April 2019.

That same year, Galligan began working as an actor-deviser for Murmuration, which debuted with Summertime starring her and Finbarr Doyle. The show featured at the 2018 Dublin Fringe Festival, where the pair were shortlisted for Best Duo, as well as the 2019 Drogheda Arts Festival and Abbey Theatre Young Curators Festival.

She was the dramaturg for Aisling O'Mara's Nothing But A Toerag in January 2019.

Galligan participated in a podcast with RISE Productions in which she, Gavin Kostick, Éanna Hardwicke, and Janet Moran performed Kostick's modern version of Homer's Odyssey. Galligan and Kostick, having worked on the project since 2017, co-created and performed in Gym Swim Party, a choreography production inspired by his take on the epic in association with O'Reilly Theatre. The production featured in the 2019 Dublin Fringe Festival.

=== Television and film ===
In her early career, Galligan featured in short films such as Strangers in the Park, Pernicio, Beautiful Youth, and Break Us. She won best actress at the Short+Sweet Film Festival and best duo alongside Mark Lawrence at the 6 on Nebraska Film Festival for Strangers in the Park, which she co-wrote. She received nominations from the Richard Harris Film Festival and the Underground Cinema Festival for her role in Pernicio.

Galligan made her television debut in 2019 with guest roles in Game of Thrones and Krypton. She landed her first major television role as Nina Zenik in the Netflix series Shadow and Bone, an adaptation of fantasy book series The Grisha Trilogy and the Six of Crows Duology by Leigh Bardugo, which premiered in 2021. A recurring character in season 1, Galligan was promoted to series regular for season 2, Galligan made her feature film debut as Naomi in Who We Love, a remake of the 2016 short film Lily.

Galligan would then reunite with Éanna Hardwicke for the film Lakelands; they jointly won the Bingham Ray New Talent Award at the Galway Film Fleadh and both received IFTA nominations. Galligan also appeared in the RTÉ crime drama Kin as Molly and the television film Every Five Miles. In 2023, she had a main role as Mallory Markum in the dark comedy series Obituary with Siobhán Cullen, which was released on RTÉ in Ireland and Hulu in the US. For her performance, Galligan received an IFTA nomination for Best Actress in a Supporting Role.

=== Other media ===
Galligan has participated in RTÉ radio dramas such as The Playboy of the Western World and Hecuba by Marina Carr. She also stars in the audible original vampire-apocalypse audio drama Impact Winter: Season 2 by Travis Beacham alongside a full cast.

== Acting credits ==
=== Film ===
Year	Title	Role	Notes
2021	Who We Love	Naomi	
2022	Lakelands	Grace	
2024	Split Milk	Maura O'Brien	
TBA	A Rare Breed	Erin	
TBA	Landlines	TBA	Filming

=== Television ===
Year	Title	Role	Notes
2015	Tinderface	Caitlyn	Episode: "Killian & Caitlyn"
2019	Game of Thrones	Sarra	Episode: "The Last of the Starks"
2019	Krypton	Enaj	2 episodes
2020	Cold Courage	Daiga Mednis	3 episodes
2021	The Great	Yula	3 episodes
2021–2023	Shadow and Bone	Nina Zenik	Recurring role (Season 1); Main role (Season 2)
2021–2023	Kin	Molly (Pharmacist)	Recurring role (Season 1); Main role (Season 2)
2022	Every Five Miles	Saoirse Kennedy	Television film
2023	Obituary	Mallory Markum	6 episodes
2025	House of Guinness	Lady Olivia Hedges	
2025	The Walsh Sisters	Claire Walsh	

=== Stage ===
Year	Title	Role	Notes
2015	The Train	Bella	Lime Tree Theatre; Dublin Theatre Festival, Project Arts Centre; Abbey Theatre
2016	Hostel 16	Danielle	Druid Theatre; Smock Alley Theatre
2016	Cascando	Auditor	Samuel Beckett Theatre
2016	Beyond Barricades	Helena / Christina / Nora / Julia	Anu Productions; 1916 Bus Tour, Dublin
2017	The Heiress	Maria	Gate Theatre
2017	All Honey	Ru	New Theatre; Dublin Fringe Festival, Bewley's
2017	The Grimm Tale of Cinderella	Ella / The Old Woman	Smock Alley Theatre
2018	Lyrics	Her	Theatre Upstairs, Eden Quay
2018	Kiss Kiss Slap		Dublin Fringe Festival, Smock Alley Theatre; Mermaid Arts Centre; Co-created
2018	12 Christmas Poems	The Songstress	Peacock Theatre
2018–2019	Summertime	Stash	Dublin Fringe Festival, Peacock Theatre; Drogheda Arts Festival; Co-created
2018–2019	We Can’t Have Monkeys in the House	Cinnamon	New Theatre; Young Curators Festival
2019	Nothing But A Toerag	—N/a	Dramaturg
2019	The Playboy Riot!	Molly Allgood	24 Hour Plays, Abbey Theatre
2019	MorphMe		Co-created
2019	Gym Swim Party	Clem	Dublin Fringe Festival, O'Reilly Theatre; Co-created
2020	Will I See You There	—N/a	Dublin Fringe Festival; Co-deviser
2022	Good Sex		Dublin Theatre Festival
2023	Somewhere Out There You	Cynthia	Dublin Theatre Festival; Abbey Theatre

=== Audio ===
Year	Title	Role	Notes
2016	The Playboy of the Western World	Susan Brady	RTÉ Drama
2018	Hecuba	Polyxena	RTÉ Drama
2019	The Odyssey: A New Version	Various roles	Irish Theatre Podcast
2023	Impact Winter: Season 2		Audible Original

=== Music video appearances ===
Song	Year	Artist	Notes
"You and Me"	2017	DAVIIS	
"Can You Feel It"	2018	Yellow Season	
"Last to Leave"	2023	Ailbhe Reddy	

== Awards and nominations ==
Year	Award	Category	Work	Result	Ref.
2018	Richard Harris Film Festival	Best Actress	Pernicio	Nominated	
2018	Underground Cinema Festival	Best Actress	Pernicio	Nominated	
2018	Dublin Fringe Festival	Judge's Choice: Best Duo	Summertime	Nominated	(Note: Shared with Finbarr Doyle.)
2019	Short+Sweet Film Festival	Best Actress	Strangers in the Park	Won	
2019	6 on Nebraska Film Festival	Best Acting Duo	Strangers in the Park	Won	(Note: Shared with Mark Lawrence.)
2022	Galway Film Fleadh	Bingham Ray New Talent Award	Lakelands	Won	(Note: Shared with Éanna Hardwicke.)
2023	Irish Film & Television Awards	Lead Actress – Film	Lakelands	Nominated	
2024	Irish Film & Television Awards	Supporting Actress – Drama	Obituary	Nominated	
