= Siobhán Cullen =

Irish actress (born 1990)

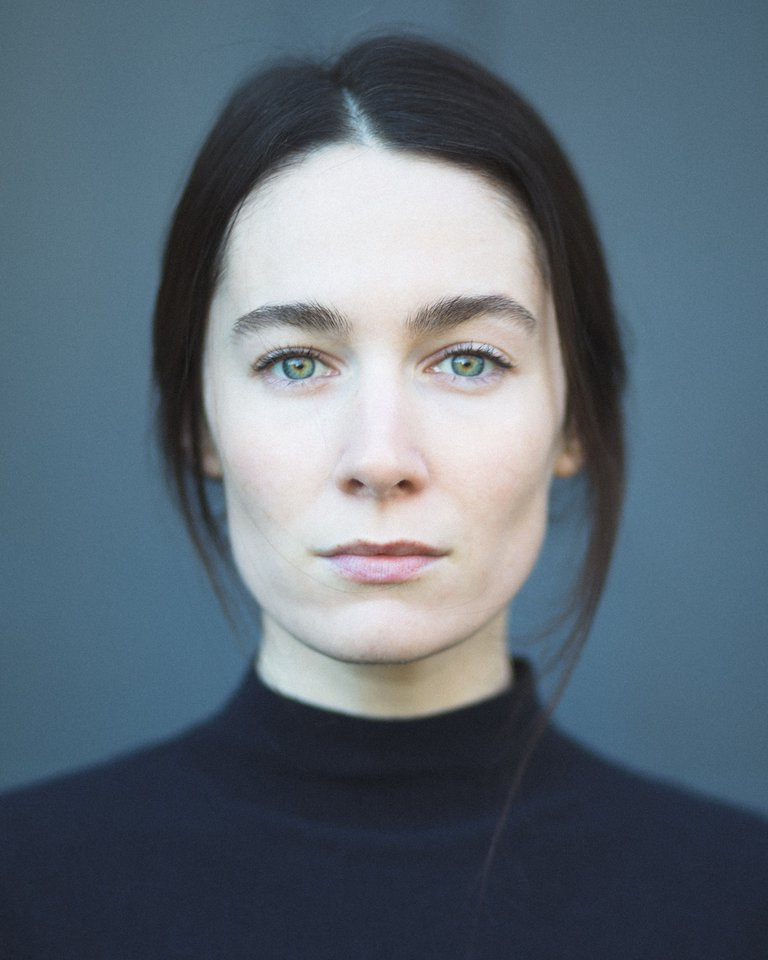
- Cullen in 2021
- Born: Siobhán Kate Cullen; 31 January 1990 (age 36); Dublin, Ireland
- Education: Trinity College Dublin
- Occupation: Actress
- Years active: 1998–present

Siobhán Kate Cullen (born 31 January 1990) is an Irish actress. She began her career as a child actress, making her debut in Marina Carr's By the Bog of Cats (1998) at the Abbey Theatre. She landed her first major screen role in Eoin Macken's horror film The Inside (2012).

Cullen had roles in the RTÉ1 and BBC Two miniseries Paula (2017), the ITV adaptation of The Long Call (2021), the BritBox series The Dry (2022–2026), the RTÉ series Obituary (2023–present), the Netflix series Bodkin (2024), and the BBC One series Babies (2026). She was named a 2022 Screen International Star of Tomorrow.

== Early life ==
Cullen grew up in Rathfarnham, a Southside suburb of Dublin. She attended Loreto High School Beaufort, an expensive private school, and took classes at Ann Kavanagh's Young People's Theatre. She graduated with a Bachelor of Arts degree in Drama and Theatre Studies from Trinity College Dublin.

== Career ==
Cullen was about eight when she was cast in her first professional play as Josie Kilbride in Marina Carr's By the Bog of Cats at the Abbey Theatre. This was followed in 2001 by her feature film debut in The Crooked Mile and another Abbey Theatre role in Ariel, and in 2003, she played young Jane Eyre at the Gate Theatre. She made her television debut as Kristen in the fifth season of the RTÉ One medical drama The Clinic, which aired in 2007.

Cullen returned to the Gate Theatre in the 2011 production of A Woman of No Importance, the 2012 production of An Enemy of the People, and the 2014 production of An Ideal Husband. Also in 2012, she starred in Eoin Macken's horror film The Inside and made her New York stage debut in The Life and Sort of Death of Eric Argyle at 59E59 Theater. She appeared in the 2013 biopic Jimi: All Is by My Side.

In 2016, Cullen appeared in the films The Randomer and The Limehouse Golem, and made her London stage debut with a small role in The Plough and the Stars at the National Theatre in 2016. She returned to television the following year as Morgan in the RTÉ1 and BBC One miniseries Paula. She starred in the YouTube Premium science fiction web series Origin.

For her lead performance in The Cherry Orchard in Galway, Cullen was nominated for an Irish Theatre Award. She starred opposite Gemma-Leah Devereux in the film The Bright Side, had a main role in the ITV crime drama The Long Call as Caroline Reasley, and made a guest appearance in an episode of Dalgliesh on Channel 5.

In 2022, Cullen starred as Caroline Sheridan in the RTÉ One and BritBox comedy-drama The Dry. She originated the role of Finnuala Connell in the Straight Line Crazy at London's Bridge Theatre and appeared in Good Sex at the Dublin Theatre Festival. Cullen appeared in the Netflix series Bodkin (or On Record) and the RTÉ series Obituary.

== Filmography ==
=== Film ===
Year	Title	Role	Notes
2001	The Crooked Mile	Jenny	
2012	The Inside	Corina	
2013	Jimi: All Is by My Side	Jenny	
2016	The Randomer	Roberta	
2016	The Limehouse Golem	Sister Mary	
2016	Glen of the Downs		Short film
2020	The Bright Side	Tracy	
TBA	Highlander †	TBA	Filming

=== Television ===
Year	Title	Role	Notes
2007	The Clinic	Kristen	3 episodes (season 5)
2017	Paula	Morgan	Miniseries
2020	The Split	Carrie Scanlon	2 episodes (season 2)
2021	The Long Call	Caroline Reasley	Main role
2021	Dalgliesh	Josephine Fallon	"Shroud for a Nightingale"
2022–present	The Dry	Caroline Sheridan	Main role
2023–present	Obituary	Elvira Clancy	Lead role
2024	Bodkin	Dubheasa "Dove" Maloney	Main role
2026	Babies	Lisa	Main role

=== Web ===
Year	Title	Role	Notes
2018	Origin	Katie Devlin	Main role

== Stage ==
Year	Title	Role	Notes
1998	By the Bog of Cats	Josie Kilbride	Abbey Theatre, Dublin
2001	Ariel	Young Elaine	Abbey Theatre, Dublin
2003	Jane Eyre	Young Jane	Gate Theatre, Dublin
2011	A Woman of No Importance	Maid	Gate Theatre, Dublin
2011	Monster/Clock	Toby	Smock Alley Theatre, Dublin
2012	The Life and Sort of Death of Eric Argyle	Gillian	59E59 Theater, New York
2012	An Enemy of the People	Randine	Gate Theatre
2012	Assassins	Emma Goldman	Rough Magic
2014	An Ideal Husband	Mabel Chiltern	Gate Theatre
2016	The Plough and the Stars	Nora Cover / Ensemble	Royal National Theatre, London
2017	The Effect	Connie	Project Arts Centre, Dublin
2017	Crestfall	Alison	The Mick Lally Theatre, Galway (as part of Galway International Arts Festival); Abbey Theatre, Dublin
2018	Richard III	Lady Anne	Lincoln Center White Light Festival, New York
2020	The Cherry Orchard	Varya	Black Box Theatre, Galway (recorded)
2021	Once Upon a Bridge	A Woman	The Mick Lally Theatre, Galway (livestreamed)
2022	Straight Line Crazy	Fionnuala Connell	Bridge Theatre, London
2022	Good Sex		Samuel Beckett Centre, Trinity College Dublin (as part of Dublin Theatre Festival)

== Awards and nominations ==
Year	Award	Category	Work	Result	Ref.
2022	Irish Theatre Awards	Best Supporting Actress	The Cherry Orchard	Nominated	
2024	Irish Film & Television Awards	Lead Actress – TV Drama	Obituary	Nominated	
2024	Irish Film & Television Awards	Rising Star		Won	
2024	Gotham Awards	Outstanding Performance in a Comedy Series	Bodkin	Nominated	
2025	Irish Film & Television Awards	Lead Actress – TV Drama	Bodkin	Nominated	
2025	Irish Film & Television Awards	Supporting Actress – TV Drama	The Dry	Nominated	
2026	Irish Film & Television Awards	Lead Actress – TV Drama	Obituary	Nominated	
