= Babies (British TV series) =

British television drama series

- Genre: Drama
- Created by: Stefan Golaszewski
- Screenplay by: Stefan Golaszewski
- Directed by: Stefan Golaszewski
- Starring: Paapa Essiedu; Siobhán Cullen; Charlotte Riley; Jack Bannon
- Opening theme: "Volcano" by Stefan Golaszewski
- Country of origin: United Kingdom
- Original language: English

Production
- Executive producers: Stefan Golaszewski; Ruth Kenley-Letts; Neil Blair; Richard Laxton; Danielle Scott-Haughton
- Producers: Lyndsay Robinson; Kelly Duffell
- Production companies: Snowed-In Productions; The Money Men Studios

Original release
- Network: BBC One
- Release: 30 March – 14 April 2026

Babies is a British television drama series created by Stefan Golaszewski for BBC One. The six-part series stars Paapa Essiedu, Siobhán Cullen, Charlotte Riley, and Jack Bannon and revolves around a young couple suffering pregnancy loss.

== Cast and characters ==
- Paapa Essiedu as Stephen
- Siobhán Cullen as Lisa
- Charlotte Riley as Amanda
- Jack Bannon as Dave
- Gary Beadle as Kevin
- Nadine Marshall as Patty

== Production ==
=== Development ===
The six-part series, written and directed by Stefan Golaszewski, was commissioned by the BBC in November 2024. with Paapa Essiedu, Siobhán Cullen, Charlotte Riley, and Jack Bannon joining the main cast. It is produced by Snowed-In Productions and The Money Men Studios, while executive producers include Golaszewski, Ruth Kenley-Letts for Snowed-In Productions, Neil Blair and Richard Laxton, and Danielle Scott-Haughton for the BBC. Producers include Lyndsay Robinson and Kelly Duffell.

Filming took place in Abbots Langley in Hertfordshire, as well as Watford, in February 2025.

== Broadcast ==
The series premiered on 30 March 2026 on BBC One, with all episodes made available to stream on BBC iPlayer.

== Reception ==
Reviewing the show for The Guardian, Sarah Dempster gave Babies five stars out of five and described it as "an unsettling, funny, moving and emotionally devastating TV triumph." The same newspaper's Rachel Aroesti called the show "beautiful", and gave particular acclaim to its theme song, "Volcano", calling it "a sweet, disenchantment-steeped Billy Bragg-meets-Kate Nash indie ballad performed by the writer-director himself."

Barbara Ellen of The Observer and James Hibbs of the Radio Times were more measured: Ellen described the programme as "far too long and intense", but also called it "powerful" and "beautifully acted", in particular Siobhán Cullen's performance "as a woman atomising before our very eyes." Hibbs awarded it four stars out of five, and praised the relatibility of the writing and the central performances, but observed that Babies "starts to fall apart somewhat in its final two instalments."
