= Loreto High School Beaufort =

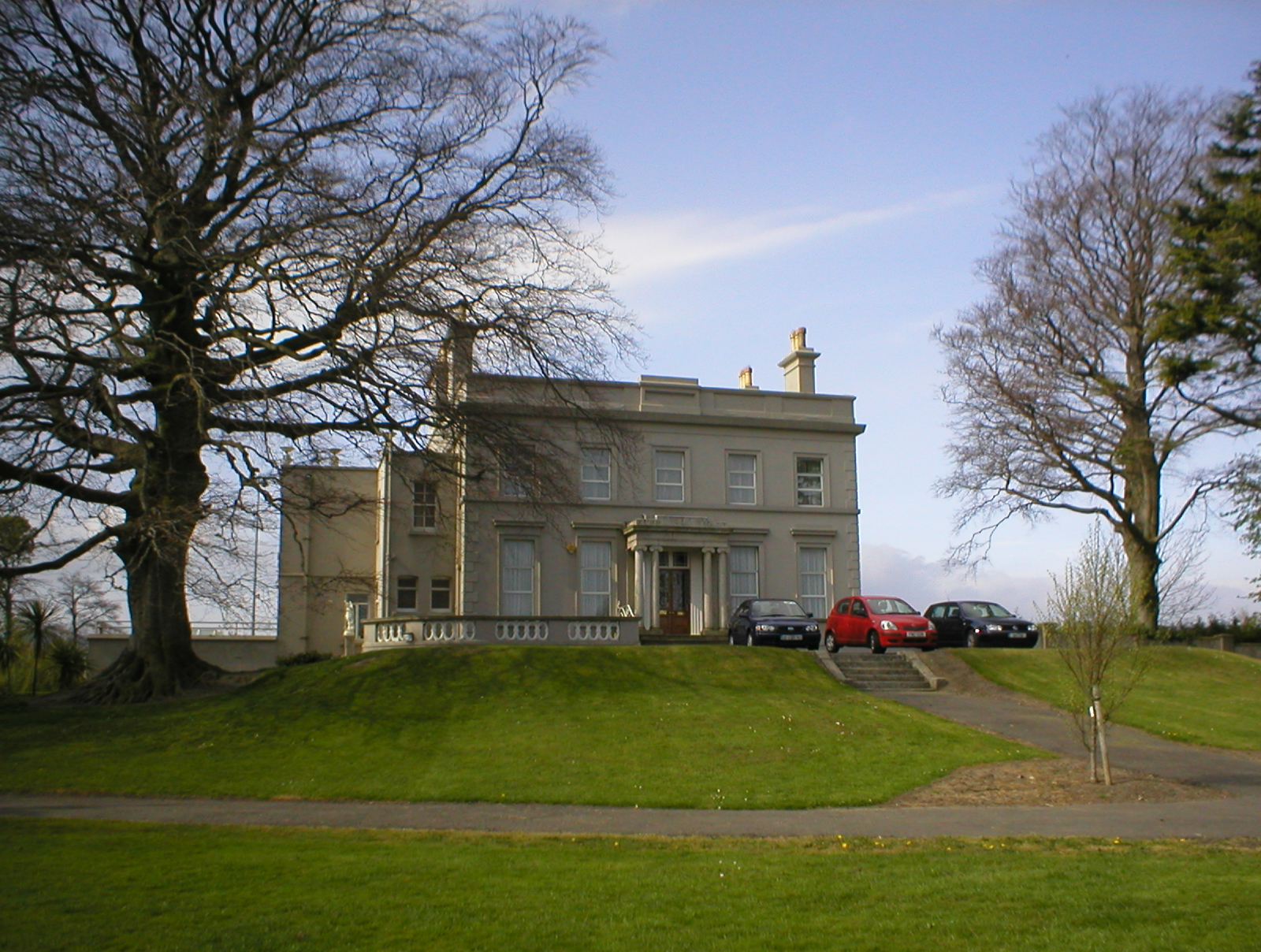
- Beaufort House

Location
- Rathfarnham, Dublin 14; Ireland; 53.2923°N 6.2833°W

Information
- Type: Secondary School
- Religious affiliation: Roman Catholic
- Established: 1925
- Principal: Aoife Kavanagh
- Gender: girls
- Enrolment: 650
- Affiliation: Sisters of Loreto
- Website: www.loretohighschool.com

Loreto High School Beaufort is a fee-paying Roman Catholic secondary school for girls located on the grounds of Beaufort House on Grange Road in the suburb of Rathfarnham in Dublin, Ireland. It is across the street from Loreto Abbey.

== History ==
Mother Frances Deasey bought Beaufort House in 1925. It became Beaufort Domestic Science College, with the ancillary buildings forming a kindergarten and junior school. A senior school building was added in 1952, and an extension including an assembly hall in 1975. The kindergarten and junior school were phased out in the 1990s.

South Dublin County Council greenlit a two-storey extension in 2017.

== Sports ==
Loreto High School Beaufort offers a variety of sports including Hockey, Basketball and Camogie, with successful Leinster wins throughout the years. The school has a strong hockey tradition with 2 hockey pitches, the main pitch is water-based grade, whilst the second pitch is half-size. In the 2024/25 school year, the Senior 1 hockey won the Leinster Cup, bringing them to the All-Irelands in which they finished third in.

== BT Young Scientist ==
Students participate in the BT Young Scientist Competition

== Notable alumni ==
- Sarah Bolger (born 1991), actress
- Siobhán Cullen (born 1990), actress
- Danielle Galligan (born 1992), actress
- Helen Keogh (born 1951), politician
- Dervla Kirwan (born 1971), actress
- Hannah Matthews (born 1991), field hockey player
- Janet Mullarney (1952–2020), sculptor
- Deirdre O'Kane (born 1968), comedian and actress
- Claire Hennessy (born 1987), author
- Olivia Tracey (born 1960), model and actress
- Rosemary Smith (born 1937), rally driver
- Sinéad Keenan (born 1977), actress
