= Paula (TV series) =

British-Irish television drama series

- DVD cover
- Genre: Crime drama; Thriller
- Created by: Conor McPherson
- Written by: Conor McPherson
- Directed by: Alex Holmes
- Starring: Denise Gough; Tom Hughes; Owen McDonnell; Edward MacLiam; Sean McGinley; Jane Brennan; Siobhán Cullen; Aoibhinn McGinnity; Emily Taaffe; Jonny Holden
- Composer: Samuel Sim
- Country of origin: United Kingdom
- Original language: English
- No. of series: 1
- No. of episodes: 3

Production
- Executive producer: Stephen Wright
- Producer: Peter Norris
- Cinematography: Stephan Pehrsson
- Editor: Philip Kloss
- Running time: 60 minutes
- Production company: Cuba Pictures

Original release
- Network: RTÉ One (Ireland); BBC Two (United Kingdom)
- Release: 25 May – 8 June 2017

Paula is a three-part British-Irish television drama series, created by screenwriter Conor McPherson, that was first broadcast on RTÉ One on 24 May 2017 in Ireland and BBC Two on 25 May 2017 in the UK. The series focuses on schoolteacher Paula Denny (Denise Gough), who after a chance encounter with handyman James Moorcroft (Tom Hughes), finds her life turned upside down and the safety of everyone she cares about in danger. Filmed in Dublin and Belfast and produced by Cuba Pictures, the series immediately drew comparisons from viewers and critics alike with fellow Northern Irish thriller The Fall. The series was commissioned in September 2016 by former controller of BBC drama, Polly Hill.

Alongside Gough and Hughes, the series also stars Owen McDonnell as police officer Mac, and Edward MacLiam as Paula's love interest, fellow teacher Philip Byrden. The series was directed by Alex Holmes and produced by Peter Norris, known for his work on former BBC2 stablemate Line of Duty. Gough said of her character: "This woman is acting out in this way that so many of us do and not apologising for it. Also I love the connection to her family. She has a weird lack of intimacy with her family and that informed why she chose unavailable men. What is also interesting is people say ‘she is not very likeable’ and that is such a funny thing we say about women in this position."

The series was released on DVD on 12 June 2017.

== Cast ==
- Denise Gough as Paula Denny
- Tom Hughes as James Moorcroft
- Owen McDonnell as DI "Mac" McArthur
- Edward MacLiam as Philip Byrden
- Sean McGinley as Terry
- Jane Brennan as Gemma
- Siobhán Cullen as Morgan
- Aoibhinn McGinnity as Crystal
- Emily Taaffe as Ruth Laurence
- Jonny Holden as Callum Denny
- Amelie Metcalfe as Mary
- Ciarán McMenamin as Ch. Supt. McGlynn
- David Herlihy as Hogan
- Aislín McGuckin as Diane

== Episodes ==
No.	Title	Directed by	Written by	Original release date	UK viewers (millions)
1	"Episode 1"	Alex Holmes	Conor McPherson	25 May 2017	3.08
Science teacher Paula Denny finds her affair with married colleague Philip Byrden spiralling out of control, and decides to put an end to their relationship. Concurrently, Paula discovers that she has a rat infestation in her basement caused by poor damp proofing fitted by the previous owners. She hires handyman James in to get rid of the rats, but James soon becomes interested in more than just Paula's rat problem. They are attracted to each other and have sex once. When Paula rebuffs the idea of a second romantic tryst, James becomes jealous and begins to act out a callous act of revenge which sets to tear her world apart.
2	"Episode 2"	Alex Holmes	Conor McPherson	1 June 2017	2.16
Following Philip's death, Paula's suspicions about James continue to grow, and when she discovers that Philip's secret note to her has disappeared, James immediately becomes prime suspect. However, as Paula's own fears begin to take over her mental wellbeing, her brother, Callum, is the victim of a serious arson attack which leaves him fighting for his life. As policeman Mac ups the ante and investigates James's strange living arrangements, he finds a woman bound and gagged in his flat. As Paula and Mac begin to allow the pressure of the case to turn into a fling, James begins to plan out the next stage of his revenge campaign.
3	"Episode 3"	Alex Holmes	Conor McPherson	8 June 2017	2.33
With James in custody, Paula tries to rebuild her life, but with news of her ordeal having made the national newspapers, she finds that her downward spiral hasn't finished yet. After losing her job, Paula decides to end Callum's life after receiving the devastating news that he may never wake up. Mac is thrown off the case by his superiors, but begins to make private connections to the disappearance of James's sister when she was just five years old. After an initial trial hearing, James is granted bail: and when the news reaches Paula, she turns to drastic measures to trap her torturer in an attempt to finally put an end to her ongoing nightmare.
