= Marina Carr =

Irish playwright (born 1964)

- Born: 1964 (age 61–62); Dublin, Ireland
- Education: University College Dublin (graduated in 1987)
- Occupation: Playwright
- Years active: 1989–present
- Notable work: By the Bog of Cats
- Children: 4
- Parents: Hugh Carr; Maura Eibhlín Breathneach
- Awards: Hennessy Award (1994); Susan Smith Blackburn (1997); Irish Times Playwright (1998); E. M. Forster Award (2001); Macaulay Fellowship; Puterbaugh Fellowship (2012); Windham-Campbell Prize (2017)

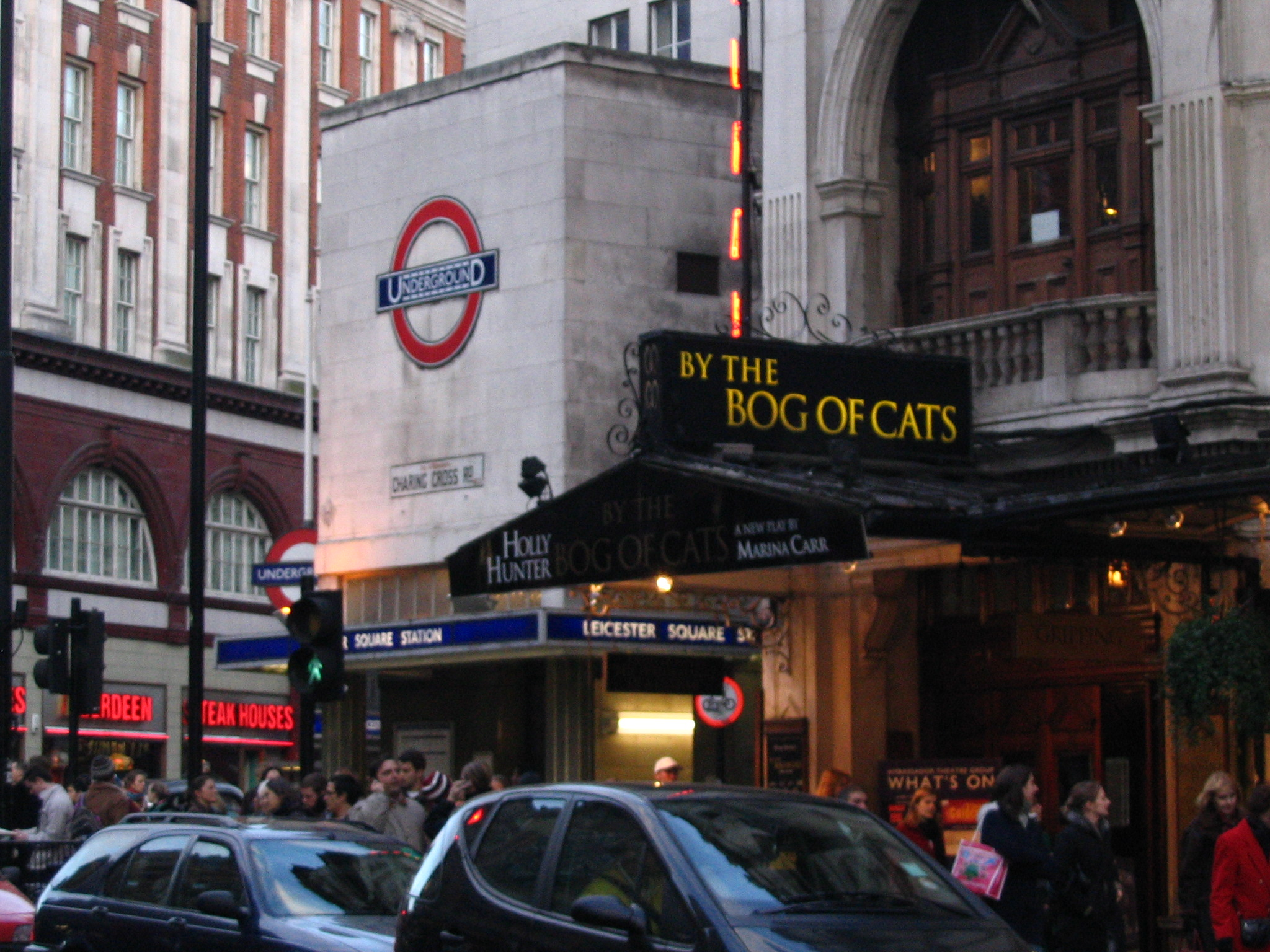
By the Bog of Cats at Wyndhams Theatre, London in 2005

Marina Carr is an Irish playwright, known for By the Bog of Cats (1998).

== Early life and education ==
Carr was born in Dublin, Ireland in 1964, but spent most of her childhood in Pallas Lake, County Offaly, adjacent to the town of Tullamore. Carr's father, Hugh Carr, was a playwright and her mother, Maura Eibhlín Breathnach, was an Irish poet. As a child, Carr and her siblings, John and Deirdre, built a theatre in their shed.

Carr attended University College Dublin, studying English and philosophy. In 2011, she received an honorary Doctorate of Literature from her alma mater.

== Career ==
Carr has held posts as writer-in-residence at the Abbey Theatre and has lectured at Trinity College Dublin, Princeton University, and Villanova University. She lectured in the English department at Dublin City University in 2016. Carr is a member of Aosdána.

== Awards ==
The Mai won the Dublin Theatre Festival's Best New Irish Play award (1994–1995), and Portia Coughlan won the nineteenth Susan Smith Blackburn Prize (1996–1997). Other awards include The Irish Times Playwright award 1998, the E. M. Forster Award from the American Academy of Arts and Letters and The American Ireland Fund Award, the Macaulay Fellowship, and The Hennessy Award. Carr was named a recipient of the Windham-Campbell Literature Award in September 2017, administered by the Beinecke Rare Book & Manuscript Library at Yale University. She was the second Irish author to receive the prize, following playwright Abbie Spallen in 2016.

== Works ==
Original Plays

- Ullaloo (1989)
- The Deer's Surrender (1990)
- This Love Thing (1991)
- Low in the Dark (1991)
- The Mai (1994)
- Portia Coughlan (1996)
- By the Bog of Cats (1998)
- Ariel (2000)
- On Raftery's Hill (2000)
- Meat and Salt (2003)
- Woman and Scarecrow (2004)
- The Cordelia Dream (2006)
- The Giant Blue Hand (2007)
- Marble (2007)
- 16 Possible Glimpses (2009)
- Hecuba (2015)
- iGirl (2021)
- Girl on an Altar (2022)
- The Map of Argentina
- Phaedra Backwards
- Audrey or Sorrow (2024)
- The Boy/The God and His Daughter (2025)
- Mirandolina (2026)

Adaptations

- Blood Wedding
- Anna Karenina

=== By the Bog of Cats ===
The original production of By the Bog of Cats took place at the Abbey Theatre in Dublin. The play opened on 7 October 1998 and ran until 14 November 1998. The production, totalling 45 performances, was directed by Patrick Mason and designed by Monica Frawley. Other members of the production team included lighting designer Nick Chelton, with sound by Dave Nolan. The lead roles were played by Siobhán Cullen (Josie Kilbride), Olwen Fouéré (Hester Swane), and Conor McDermottroe (Carthage Kilbride). Other characters were played by Joan O’Hara (Catwoman), Fionnuala Murphy (Carline Cassidy), and Tom Hickey (Xavier Cassidy).

Irish writer Frank McGuinness wrote the programme note for the Abbey production of By the Bog of Cats in 1998. His description of the play analyses Carr's style of writing, which he likens to Greek writing:

By the Bog of Cats... is a play about sorrow. Therefore it must be funny. A play about death, so a wedding shall be at the centre of it. A play about saying the things that need to be said, so there will be silence at the end of it. A play about hatred, so love is at its heart. A play whose philosophy is that Carthage must be destroyed, but what happens to the destroyers? This is what By the Bog of Cats... tells us.

— Frank McGuinness, By the Bog of Cats... Programme Note, 1998.

=== Woman and Scarecrow ===
Woman and Scarecrow centres on a dying woman's last stretch of time on earth, reflecting on her life. We are told very little of the setting, but presume she resides in a domestic space, as the stage directions in the first act indicate she is lying in bed 'gaunt and ill'. Apart from the bed, the only furniture indicated is a wardrobe, which has an ominous presence in the play. The mysterious thing that lurks inside the wardrobe signifies death and its imminent approach. For a good part of the play, the only other character present is Scarecrow. It is unclear what Scarecrow represents, perhaps the woman's subconscious. It is significant to note that all of the characters in the play "are referred to by either pronouns or titles - Woman, Him, Scarecrow, Auntie Ah, placing a universal slant on who they are and what they represent." The woman is largely defined in her role as mother and wife throughout the play. She is the mother of eight children, with a ninth having died. As the play progresses, we learn that her husband has been unfaithful. Despite being aware of this, a Woman at times is still dependent on Him, 'I've missed you in bed beside me. On other occasions she redeems herself, asserting her independence by insisting she will not wear her wedding ring to the grave and places value on herself, 'save you were not worthy of my love'. Her independence is consolidated by the fact that she dies when he is absent from the room. The play runs for approximately 2 hours 20 minutes.

Woman and Scarecrow was staged for the first time at the Royal Court Jerwood Theatre in London in 2006, directed by Ramin Gray and starring Fiona Shaw and Bríd Brennan as Woman and Scarecrow, respectively. Lizzie Clachan designed the set for this production, alongside lighting designer, Mischa Twitchin, and sound designer, Emma Laxton. Later, it was produced in the Peacock Theatre, where it was directed by Selina Cartmell and starred Olwen Fouéré (Woman) and Barbara Brennan (Scarecrow).

The play opened at the Irish Repertory Theatre in New York in May 2018. Directed by Ciarán O'Reilly, the cast included Stephanie Roth Haberle (the woman), Pamela Gray (Scarecrow), Aidan Redmond (the husband), and Dale Soules (the aunt).

=== The Mai ===
The Mai is about a woman in her late 30s, whose husband (and absentee father to their children) returns from having abandoned them, and wants to give their relationship another chance. The play is divided into two acts. The setting for act one is the summer of 1979 (Robert's return from a long time away) and the setting for act two is a year later, as we check in on the state of the precarious relationships established in the first half of the play. Throughout the play, the eponymous The Mai grapples with struggling to keep her marriage alive despite Robert's frequent cheating and conceding to the opinions of her family and leaving him. In the end, she confesses to her daughter Millie, who has served as the narrator of this piece, that she cannot imagine a life without Robert where she would be happy nor a life with him where they could co-exist peaceably together.

The original production of The Mai took place at and was produced by, the Abbey Theatre on 5 October 1994. It was directed by Brian Brady and designed by Kathy Strachan. The lead roles were played by Olwen Fouere (The Mai), Derbhle Crotty (Millie), Joan O'Hara (Grandma Fraochlan) Owen Roe (Robert), Brid Ni Neachtain (Beck), Stella McCusker (Julie), and Maire Hastings (Agnes)

The Mai is thematically in keeping with the main themes of Carr's other work. These characters are all grappling with their roles as mothers and their roles as wives. It is clear that most of them prioritize their husbands over their children and if they didn't, they end up regretting it like Beck, who after pouring herself into her marriage still had to watch it dissolve. Even Grandmother Froachlan, the matriarch of the family says that she would have gladly thrown all of her children into "the slopes of hell" to be reunited with the nine-fingered fisherman. Throughout the play, Carr weaves these characters' relationships in and out of each other to the rhythm of nearby ecology. Millie takes particular interest in the folklore of Owl Lake. In discussing the marital failures alongside the professional triumphs of these women, Carr uses them as vessels to discuss the role of marriage in capitalism and its discriminating patriarchal practices towards unmarried women and single mothers. The Mai is said to have built a sturdy home for her and her children in the years that Robert was gone. This kind of upward mobility is revered by most around her apart from Robert who dismissed her success as having come directly from his generosity. The Mai immediately corrects him reminding him that she was a cellist in the college orchestra and that after he left her to raise their kids alone, she was also teaching full-time. Discourse on marriage and its link to capital is apparent here as the characters talk about how when they lost their husbands, they lost everything, referring to their current socioeconomic status as spinsters.

=== Marble ===
Marble opened in Dublin in 2009 at The Abbey Theatre. The four characters are husband and wife Ben and Catherine and a second couple Anne and Art. The play runs for approximately 1 hour 40 minutes.

Translated into Spanish as Mármol the play opened in Madrid in November 2016 at the Teatro Valle-Inclán, home to the National Drama Centre. It was directed by Antonio C. Guijosa and translated into Spanish by Antonio C. Guijosa and Marta I. Moreno. The cast included José Luis Alcobendas (Ben), Elena González (Catherine), Susana Hernández (Anne) and Pepe Viyuela (Art).

=== Mirandolina ===
The Mirandolina project began with the Teatro Stabile del Veneto, which asked Marina Carr to rewrite a classic by Carlo Goldoni. Among Goldoni's comedies, Carr chose La locandiera (The Mistress of the Inn) as inspiration for a rewrite that addresses the issue of gender violence and the fear of women who attempt to resist male oppression.

The play is set in an Italian restaurant in Dublin (the original story was set in Florence, not in Venice, Goldoni's hometown), where Mirandolina works alongside men who desire her and would do anything to subjugate her to their will. The young woman's intelligence allows her to stand up to all her suitors. Mirandolina mocks them, but unfulfilled male desire soon proves capable of terrible acts, turning into cruel violence.

Mirandolina is an international co-production of the Teatro Stabile del Veneto – National Theatre, with the Abbey Theatre – National Theatre of Ireland and the Croatian National Theatre Rijeka. It premiered on February 5, 2026, in Treviso, Italy, directed by Caitriona McLaughlin.

== Publications ==
- The Mai. London: Dufour Editions, 1995.
- By the Bog of Cats. The Abbey, Dublin, and Wyndham's Theater, London. 1998
- Plays One. London: Faber and Faber, 1999.
- On Raftery's Hill. London: Faber and Faber, 2000.
- Ariel. Oldcastle, Co. Meath: Gallery Books, 2002.
- Woman and Scarecrow. London: Faber and Faber, 2006
- Marble. Oldcastle, Co. Meath: Gallery Books, 2009
- Plays Two. London: Faber and Faber, 2009
- 16 Possible Glimpses. The Abbey Theatre, 2011
- Plays Three. London: Faber and Faber, 2015
- 1 in 5. Roe Valley Hospital, 2011
- Girl on an Altar. London: Faber and Faber, 2022.
