= By the Bog of Cats =

Play by Marina Carr

- Written by: Marina Carr
- Based on: Medea by Greek myth
- Characters: Hester Swane; Carthage Kilbride; Josie Kilbride; Mrs. Kilbride; Monica Murray; The Catwoman; Xavier Cassidy; Caroline Cassidy; The Ghost Fancier; The Ghost of Joseph Swane; Father Willow; Young Dunne
- Original language: English
- Subject: Land ownership, Motherhood, Betrayal/Abandonment, Ethnic prejudice
- Genre: Tragedy, Dark Comedy
- Setting: The Irish Midlands in an unspecified period of the Modern Era.

Premiere
- Date premiered: October 1998
- Place premiered: Abbey Theatre, Dublin

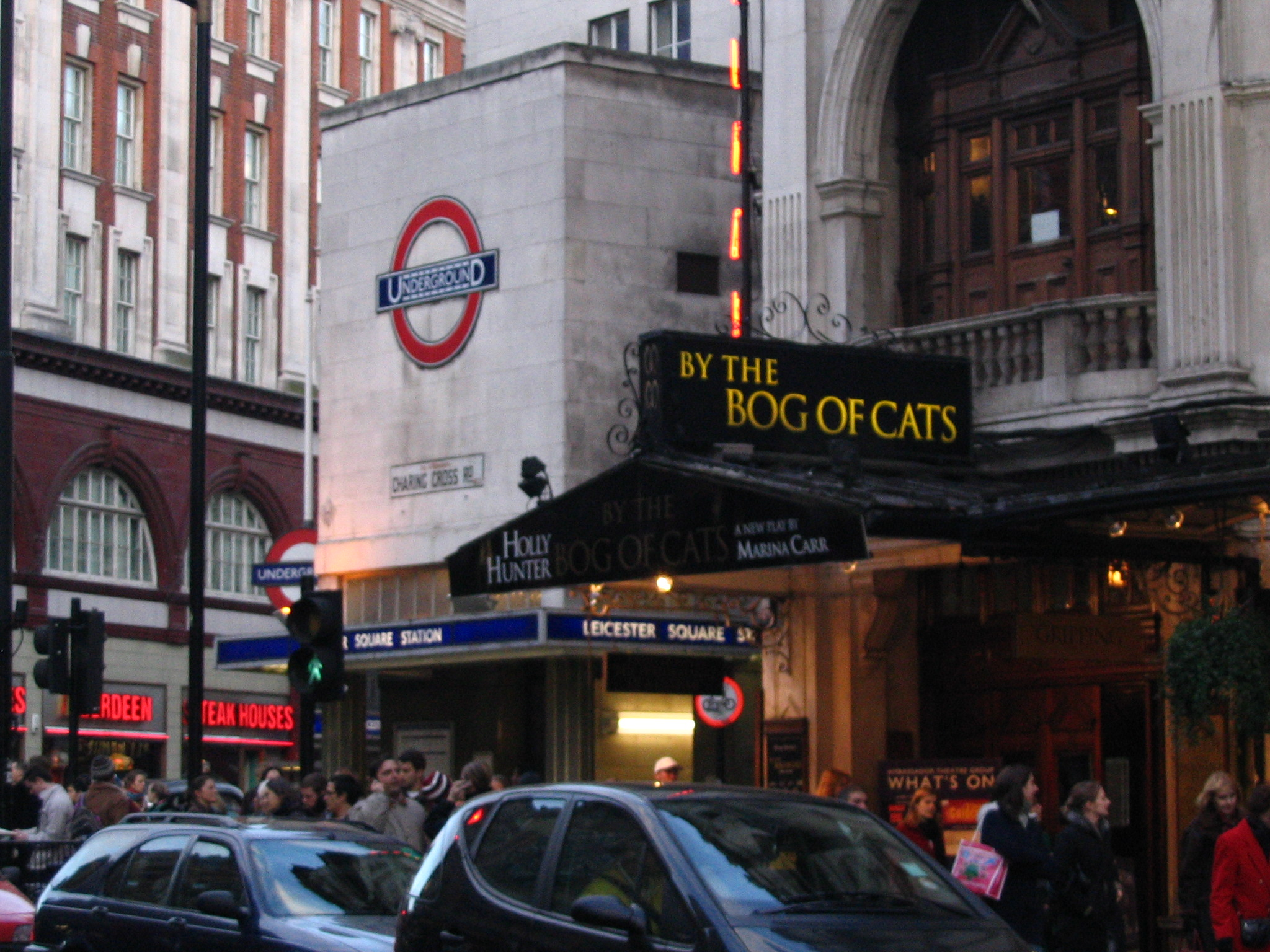
Advertising for the 2005 London production.

By the Bog of Cats is a play by Marina Carr. By the Bog of Cats premiered at Dublin’s Abbey Theatre in October 1998. A 2004 revival of the play in London's West End starred American actress Holly Hunter in the role of protagonist Hester Swane. The play takes place in the Irish Midlands in an unspecified time in the modern era. It is loosely based on the Greek myth Medea. In this myth, the sorceress Medea marries the hero Jason and has two children with him. When Jason leaves her for another woman, Medea kills their children, Jason’s new bride, and the bride’s father. By the Bog of Cats contains many mystical and mythical elements, including ghosts, curses, and references to witchcraft. It includes themes of land ownership, motherhood, betrayal/abandonment, and ethnic prejudice.

== Plot summary ==
=== Act One ===
At the beginning of the play, Hester Swane is dragging a dead black swan across the snow and ice on the Bog of Cats. The Ghost Fancier has come to collect her but realizes that he is early as Hester is still alive. The Ghost Fancier exits and says that he will return at a later time. Hester’s neighbour, Monica Murray, enters and attempts to convince Hester to accept the impending marriage between Hester’s former lover, Carthage, and his much younger bride, Caroline Cassidy. Upon this marriage, Carthage will inherit Cassidy’s father’s farm. While digging a grave for the swan, Hester talks with the Catwoman about how her mother, Josie Swane, left her in the swan’s lair as an infant and claimed: “that child…will live as long as this black swan, not a day more, not a day less." During this conversation, the audience learns that Hester has been waiting on the Bog of Cats for her mother, Josie, since she was abandoned at age 7. The Catwoman urges Hester not to wait any longer for her mother, but Hester refuses to leave the Bog. In the next scene, Hester and Carthage's 7-year-old daughter Josie plays cards and discusses Carthage's upcoming wedding with her grandmother, Mrs Kilbride. Mrs Kilbride cheats her granddaughter at cards and talks disparagingly of Hester because of Hester's lack of fortune and inferior “tinker” blood. Meanwhile, Caroline Cassidy visits Hester in her wedding dress and attempts to convince Hester to allow her to marry Carthage without disruption and to leave the house on the bog, which Hester has previously signed over to Carthage. Hester scorns Caroline and reminds her that Hester was once her babysitter. Hester challenges Caroline about Carthage and claims: “Carthage Kilbride is mine and only mine. He’s been mine since he was sixteen. You think ya can take him from me? Wrong. All wrong. Now get out of me sight." Following Caroline's visit, Carthage also visits Hester in his wedding clothes and also attempts to convince her to leave the house. Hester reminds him that it was with her money that he bought his first land and accuses him of “sellin’ me and Josie down the river for a few lumpy auld acres and notions of respectability." Xavier Cassidy, Caroline’s father, also visits Hester to urge her to leave. Hester refuses to listen to any of the visitors and insists that she is staying on the Bog of Cats until her mother returns for her.

=== Act Two ===
This act depicts the marriage of Caroline Cassidy and Carthage Kilbride, which is disrupted by various individuals, both real persons and ghosts. The ghost of Joseph Swane, Hester’s murdered brother, returns and talks to the Catwoman and Hester to find out why Hester killed him. Father Willow and the Catwoman talk of going on a holiday together. Mrs. Kilbride, Carthage’s mother, wears a white dress to the wedding and poses in pictures with her son like a bride and groom. She also interrupts the bride’s father’s toast in order to make her own speech about her son. To scorn Caroline and Carthage’s insult of coming to her house in their wedding clothes, Hester appears at the wedding in a wedding dress that Carthage had bought for her nine years ago, along with promises to marry her. Mrs. Kilbride and Xavier Cassidy attempt to violently eject Hester from the wedding, while Hester’s neighbour Monica chides them for being too hard on Hester. Hester lashes out in anger against the wedding guests and pleads with them, insisting: “I can’t lave till me mother comes. I’d hope she’d have come before now and it wouldn’t come to this. Don’t make me lave this place or somethin’ terrible’ll happen." When she is finally forced to leave the wedding, Hester swears revenge and yells: “You’re lavin’ me no choice but a vicious war against ya."

=== Act Three ===
The final act is characterized by death and destruction. As her house blazes behind her, Hester talks with the ghost of her brother, Joseph Swane, and explains that she did not kill him for money; rather, she envied his relationship with their mother. Hester informs him that Carthage took Joseph’s money, used it to buy land for himself, and left Hester for another woman. Hester’s neighbour, Monica, interrupts this conversation to tell Hester that her house is on fire. Hester, having set the fire herself, is completely indifferent. Monica begs Hester to leave, and Hester insists that she is still waiting for her mother. Xavier Cassidy comes to chide Hester for ruining the wedding. Shortly after Xavier, Carthage arrives and is outraged to see the fire destroying the home and the livestock. Hester angrily accosts Carthage for his role in her brother’s death. Carthage swears that he will take Josie away from Hester by having her declared an unfit mother. Due to the Ghost Fancier’s visit, Hester knows that she is fated to die. When Josie begs Hester not to leave her, Hester slits her throat in order to spare her the same fate of living without her mother. The Ghost Fancier performs a slow death dance with Hester before plunging a blade into her chest, killing her.

== Characters ==
=== Characters ===
Hester Swane: Swane is a forty-year-old “tinker” woman who has lived on the Bog of Cats her entire life. When she was seven years old, her mother, Josie Swane (not pictured in the play), abandoned her on the Bog. She has been waiting there for her mother ever since. Hester has a daughter, Josie, with Carthage Kilbride. She is very resentful that Carthage has left her to marry Caroline Cassidy, the daughter of wealthy landowner Xavier Cassidy so that he can inherit the Cassidy farm. Before the action of the play, Hester, with the help of Carthage, murdered her half-brother Joseph Swane, out of jealousy for his life with their mother.

Carthage Kilbride: Carthage is Hester's former lover with whom she shares a daughter, Josie Kilbride. He leaves Hester due to his greed for land and social ambitions. At thirty years old, he is ten years Hester's junior. He began a relationship with her at sixteen years old. During their relationship, Hester encouraged Carthage to have ambitions beyond his social class as a labourer's son, even giving Carthage the money to buy his first land. The conflict between Hester and Carthage centres around his attempts to force Hester to leave her home on the bog and give him sole custody of their daughter.

Josie Kilbride: Josie is Hester's and Carthage's seven-year-old daughter. She is the same age that Hester was when her mother left her and the Bog of Cats. She is a generous, loving little girl who enjoys spending time with both her mother, father and mean-spirited, greedy grandmother. Josie sings several songs throughout the course of the play which foreshadow her death on the Bog of Cats.

Mrs. Kilbride: She is Carthage's mother, aged in her sixties. She looks down on Hester because Hester belongs to the “tinkers” and tries to hide the fact that her own grandfather was a tinker. Mrs. Kilbride calls her granddaughter a “little bastard” because she was born out of wedlock. She is very greedy and constantly focuses on issues of social class and money. She even cheats her granddaughter for money while they are playing cards. Mrs. Kilbride also has an inappropriate attachment to her son, Carthage. She appears in a white dress at Carthage's wedding and interrupts the bride's father's speech to make her own toast dedicated to her son.

=== Minor characters ===
Monica Murray: She is Hester Swane's sixty-year-old neighbour on the Bog of Cats. While she does at times seem sympathetic to Hester, she attempts to carry out the community's wishes and convince Hester to leave her house on the bog so that Carthage and his new bride can move in there. She also tries to convince Hester to accept the marriage between Caroline and Carthage. Despite this, Hester begs Monica to tell her stories about her mother.

The Catwoman: The Catwoman is a strange mystical figure who most closely echoes the blind prophet Tiresias from Greek myth. She eats mice and drinks milk from a saucer. She has magical powers that include prophecy and talking to spirits. It is hinted that she may have some kind of intimate relationship with the eighty-year-old parish priest, Father Willow. Even though the community sees the Catwoman as eccentric, they still invite her to all of their functions and consider it bad luck not to do so.

Xavier Cassidy: Xavier is a farmer who schemes to marry his daughter to someone he can easily control since his daughter cannot inherit his land. He convinces Carthage to marry Caroline and promises to sign over the farm to him. Hester believes that Xavier was in love with her mother and attempted to woo her before she left the Bog.

Caroline Cassidy: Caroline is the twenty-year-old daughter of Xavier Cassidy who marries Carthage Kilbride. To add insult to injury, Hester often babysat Caroline as a child. Caroline is very meek and follows orders from both Xavier and Carthage. However, she does express guilt about the marriage to Xavier because she feels that they are being unfair to Hester.

The Ghost Fancier: This ghostly figure appears at the beginning of the play to collect the spirit of Hester. However, Hester is still alive, so the Ghost Fancier realises he is too early. He comes back at the end of the play after Hester kills Josie, and Hester kills herself.

The Ghost of Joseph Swane: The ghost of Hester's brother returns to the Bog of Cats to find out why Hester killed him. He believes that Hester was just trying to steal money from him. However, in their conversation, Hester reveals that she was jealous of his relationship with their mother.

Father Willow: The Catholic parish priest who officiates Caroline and Carthage's wedding. He is hinted to be inappropriately close with the Catwoman. He is about eighty years old, is confused and forgetful, and muddles his prayers and liturgy.

Young Dunne: The waiter, who serves the guests at the wedding of Carthage and Caroline.

== Productions and reception ==
According to theater scholar and critic Melissa Sihra, Carr's plays have appeared in award-winning productions at the Abbey, Peacock, Gate, and Project Theatres in Dublin as well as the San Jose Repertory Theatre, Irish Repertory of Chicago, the Pittsburgh Irish and Classical Theatre, and the MacArthur Theatre at Princeton in the United States.

=== Original production ===
By the Bog of Cats premiered at Dublin's Abbey Theatre on Wednesday, 7 October 1998, and ran for 45 performances until Saturday, 14 November 1998. Actress Olwen Fouéré created the role of Hester Swane.

=== Selected revivals ===
The American premiere was staged by Irish Repertory of Chicago, opening 31 May 2001. Carr made several script changes for this production, mostly having to do with the Joseph Swane scene in Act III. The production was directed by Kay Martinovich, and featured Tracy Michelle Arnold as Hester, along with Mark Montgomery, Mary Ann Thebus, and David Darlow in the principal roles. Critical reception was strongly positive, with Chicago Sun-Times critic Hedy Weiss writing "... the play is now receiving a riveting, brilliantly acted American premiere by Irish Repertory, in a production superbly directed-with chilling inevitability and unexpected humour-by Kay Martinovich."

The 2004 West End revival of By the Bog of Cats starred Holly Hunter. Reviews of this production were mixed. While most reviewers praised Hunter's performance, many found issues with the play itself. Matt Wolf, in a review for Variety, decries the "blarney in which 'Bog' is bogged down." Charles Spencer, in a scathing article for the Telegraph, states that Marina Carr "delivers little more than a ludicrously rich stew of over-heated tosh" in By the Bog of Cats. Alan Bird, writing for London Theatre, differs in calling By the Bog of Cats "an outstanding dark psychological drama" and a "hilarious dark comedy.". Hunter had prepared for the West End revival by starring in a 2001 production at the San Jose Repertory Theatre.

By the Bog of Cats returned to Dublin's Abbey Theatre from August–September 2015. Elements of this production were slightly satirical. For example, the Ghost Fancier was depicted as a "singing cowboy" who is "trailed by country and western music." Additionally, reviewer Peter Crawley connects the Kilbride family to the newly rich Irish at "the crude beginnings of the Celtic Tiger years." Crawley had several criticisms for the play, including finding Hester a less than interesting character and calling the second act "structurally unwieldy."

A recent production of By the Bog of Cats premiered at Chicago's Artistic Home Theater on February 15 and ran through April 15. The production received a rating of 3 stars from reviewer Kerry Reid. Reid noted that Carr's plays are produced "stateside far less" than other Irish playwrights, despite a "long-running relationship with Dublin's celebrated Abbey Theatre, which has served as a pipeline for Irish dramatists to American stages for decades." Reid contends that the play has not been produced locally since the defunct Irish Repertory of Chicago produced it in 2001.

== Parallels with Medea ==
Marina Carr, the author of the play, has acknowledged that By the Bog of Cats was inspired by the myth of Medea. In Euripides's theatrical adaptation, as in the ancient Greek myth, Medea is a sorceress and wife to the hero Jason. When her husband decides to marry another, she kills his new lover and their two children in revenge.

The main parallel between Medea and By the Bog of Cats is the way Hester Swane, the heroine, enacts her revenge on her disloyal husband, Carthage Kilbride. Her retaliation consists of setting fire to Carthage and his new wife's home and killing her own daughter, Josie, just as Medea punished Jason in the Greek myth. The significant difference between these two stories is the setting: while Medea is set in ancient Greece, By the Bog of Cats is transported to the bogs of Ireland.

A reviewer of the 2017 revival in Chicago noted that what makes the play distinct from Euripides's adaptation, and what makes it distinctly Irish, is the themes of displacement and disposition. However, the heightened emotions and broad, existential themes of “love and hate, hope and despair, [and] grief and revenge” justify the comparisons of these two tragedies.

== Supernatural elements ==
By the Bog of Cats is characterized by supernatural elements, such as ghosts, curses, and prophecies. Some of the characters manifest as ghosts, like the Ghost Fancier and Joseph Swane, Hester's murdered brother. Furthermore, Hester has been cursed by her mother to live as long as the black swan residing in the bog, “not a day more, not a day less.” This curse is fulfilled by Hester's death at the end of the play. Finally, the Catwoman is acknowledged by the characters as a psychic: she speaks of the many visions she has had that came true, and during his wedding Carthage asks her for a prediction.

One scholar notes the presence of the Irish tradition of combining both Pagan and Christian elements and practicing them side by side, which is characteristic of Irish folktales.

=== Witchcraft ===
The character of Hester has been interpreted as a witch by scholars and critics alike, though she does not explicitly practice witchcraft in the play. Even her daughter calls her a “Jezebel witch,” and the rest of the community uses it as a derogatory term in reference to her. Though she says she doesn't know any “black art things,” her connection to the spiritual world is real, specifically marked by her ability to speak to ghosts. For this reason, the Catwoman can also be interpreted as a witch on the basis of her conversations with spirits and her psychic abilities.

Hester's characterisation as a witch also stems from her deep connection to the bog, as she claims to know “where the best bog rosemary grows and the sweetest wild bog rue.” This points to a knowledge of herbs and herbal medicine, which one scholar says indicates a connection with folk tradition and the mystical.
