= The Dry (TV series) =

2022 Irish comedy-drama series

- Title card
- Genre: Comedy-drama
- Created by: Nancy Harris
- Written by: Nancy Harris
- Directed by: Paddy Breathnach
- Starring: Roisin Gallagher; Siobhán Cullen; Pom Boyd; Moe Dunford; Adam John Richardson; Eoin Duffy; Ciarán Hinds; Sam Keeley
- Composer: Sarah Lynch
- Country of origin: Ireland
- Original language: English
- No. of series: 3
- No. of episodes: 24

Production
- Executive producers: Emma Norton; Michael Dawson; Ed Guiney; Andrew Lowe; Nancy Harris; Sarah Cloke; Niamh Cowley; Dermot Horan; Paddy Breathnach; Andrew Byrne; Nana Hughes
- Production companies: Element Pictures; Screen Ireland; ITV Studios

Original release
- Network: BritBox (United Kingdom; series 1); RTÉ One (Ireland); ITVX (United Kingdom; series 2)
- Release: 5 May 2022 – April 23, 2026

The Dry is an Irish comedy-drama television series created by Nancy Harris and produced by Element Pictures for RTÉ. It stars Roisin Gallagher, Siobhán Cullen, Moe Dunford and Ciarán Hinds. The series premiered as a BritBox original on 5 May 2022.

A second series was released on ITVX on 14 March 2024. On 8 January 2025, it was renewed for a third and final series. It premiered on RTÉ One on 23 April 2026.

== Synopsis ==
Shiv Sheridan (Gallagher), a woman recovering from alcoholism, returns home to Dublin to face a family who are not terribly supportive of her sobriety. She is 35, and has spent the last ten years in London trying to make it as an artist, but has nothing to show for it. Having lost her job at a gallery and fallen out with flat mates who were always partying, she returns home for her Granny's funeral and asks her mother if she can stay. It is clear that the family all drink, sometimes to excess, and her brother does coke – so staying won't be easy.

== Cast ==
=== Main ===
- Roisin Gallagher as Shiv Sheridan
- Siobhán Cullen as Caroline Sheridan
- Pom Boyd as Bernie Sheridan
- Moe Dunford as Jack
- Adam John Richardson as Ant Sheridan
- Eoin Duffy as Rory
- Ciarán Hinds as Tom Sheridan
- Sam Keeley as Alex (series 2)
- Rick Donald as Daryl (series 3)

=== Recurring ===
- Emmanuel Okoye as Max
- Janet Moran as Karen
- Hélène Patarot as Mina
- Dagmar Döring as Kristen
- Stephen Hogan as Dan
- Barry Barnes as Simon
- Bryan Quinn as Eddie
- Marion O'Dwyer as Aunty Ag
- Charlotte Bradley as Aunty Rita
- Michael McElhatton as Finbar (series 2)
- Anthony Morris as Mickey
- Des Nealon as Uncle Joe
- Barry Barnes as Simon (series 1)
- Thommas Kane Byrne as Billy (series 2)
- Seán Doyle as Shane (series 2)
- Helen Norton as Dearbhla (series 2)
- Paula Lafayette as Marie-Luisa (series 2)
- Ruth Codd as Bibi (series 2)
- Justine Mitchell as Áine Harrington (series 2-3)
- Imogen Doel as Anna (series 3)

== Episodes ==
=== Series 1 ===
No. overall	No. in series	Title	Directed by	Written by	Original release date
1	1	"Episode 1"	Paddy Breathnach	Nancy Harris	5 May 2022
2	2	"Episode 2"	Paddy Breathnach	Nancy Harris	5 May 2022
3	3	"Episode 3"	Paddy Breathnach	Nancy Harris	5 May 2022
4	4	"Episode 4"	Paddy Breathnach	Nancy Harris	5 May 2022
5	5	"Episode 5"	Paddy Breathnach	Nancy Harris	5 May 2022
6	6	"Episode 6"	Paddy Breathnach	Nancy Harris	5 May 2022
7	7	"Episode 7"	Paddy Breathnach	Nancy Harris	5 May 2022
8	8	"Episode 8"	Paddy Breathnach	Nancy Harris	5 May 2022

=== Series 2 ===
No. overall	No. in series	Title	Directed by	Written by	Original release date
9	1	"Birthday"	Paddy Breathnach	Nancy Harris	14 March 2024
10	2	"Life Drawing"	Paddy Breathnach	Nancy Harris	14 March 2024
11	3	"Meetings"	Paddy Breathnach	Nancy Harris	14 March 2024
12	4	"Alternative Therapies"	Paddy Breathnach	Nancy Harris	14 March 2024
13	5	"Interview"	Paddy Breathnach	Nancy Harris	14 March 2024
14	6	"Kissing"	Paddy Breathnach	Nancy Harris	14 March 2024
15	7	"Camping"	Paddy Breathnach	Nancy Harris	14 March 2024
16	8	"Auction"	Paddy Breathnach	Nancy Harris	14 March 2024

=== Series 3 ===
No. overall	No. in series	Title	Directed by	Written by	Original release date
17	1	"Skeletons"	Paddy Breathnach	Nancy Harris	23 April 2026
18	2	"Latching"	Paddy Breathnach	Nancy Harris	23 April 2026
19	3	"The Missing"	Paddy Breathnach	Nancy Harris	23 April 2026
20	4	"Visiting Hour"	Paddy Breathnach	Nancy Harris	23 April 2026
21	5	"Proposals"	Paddy Breathnach	Nancy Harris	23 April 2026
22	6	"Cracks"	Paddy Breathnach	Nancy Harris	23 April 2026
23	7	"Family Meeting Part Three"	Paddy Breathnach	Nancy Harris	23 April 2026
24	8	"Home"	Paddy Breathnach	Nancy Harris	23 April 2026

== Production ==
Harris was inspired to develop the series in 2016, given her sense of being estranged from her Irish identity. The series was in development from Element for RTÉ One in 2020, and it was confirmed that December that the project would receive funding from the Broadcasting Authority of Ireland. In August 2021, it was announced BritBox had commissioned The Dry from Element in association with Screen Ireland, ITV Studios and RTÉ. Harris is executive producing the series alongside Emma Norton, Michael Dawson, Ed Guiney and Andrew Lowe.

Alongside the commission came the casting announcement; Roisin Gallagher would lead the series along with Ciarán Hinds, Siobhán Cullen, Moe Dunford, Adam J. Richardson and Pom Boyd.

Principal photography for the first series began in August 2021.
