= Obituary (TV series) =

Irish TV series

- Genre: Black comedy
- Created by: Ray Lawlor
- Written by: Ray Lawlor
- Directed by: John Hayes; Oonagh Kearney
- Starring: Siobhán Cullen; Michael Smiley; Ronan Raftery; Danielle Galligan; David Ganly
- Composer: Steve Lynch
- Country of origin: Ireland
- Original language: English
- No. of series: 2
- No. of episodes: 12

Production
- Executive producers: David Crean; Dermot Horan; Laurent Boissel; Paddy Hayes
- Producer: Nell Green
- Cinematography: James Mather
- Editor: Tony Kearns
- Camera setup: Multi-camera
- Running time: 52 minutes
- Production companies: APC Studios; Magamedia

Original release
- Network: RTÉ One
- Release: 26 September 2023 – present

Obituary is a 2023 Irish black comedy television series created by Ray Lawlor for RTÉ and starring Siobhán Cullen. Its first series originally aired in September and October 2023, and its second series aired between October and November 2025.

It showed in the United States on Hulu. A second series aired in 2025. It also airs on AMC Networks International Southern Europe (Spain and Portugal), Netflix (UK), BritBox (Australia), TVNZ (New Zealand), One (Germany), Proximus Pickx (Belgium), Radio Télévision Suisse (Switzerland), Rádio e Televisão de Portugal, BluTV/Max (Turkey and Cyprus), Tet (Latvia), and CTV Drama (Canada).

== Background ==
Filming took place in Ballyshannon and Bundoran in the south of County Donegal in Ulster, even though the series is set somewhere "down south" in Ireland.

== Plot ==
In a small Irish town, a young woman obsessed with death becomes an obituarist for the local newspaper. Seeking more interesting deaths to write about, she begins to murder local people.

In the second season, Elvira deals with her father's death by beginning to kill again, but there is another serial killer in town, and local Gardaí begin to suspect Elvira.

== Cast ==
- Siobhán Cullen as Elvira Clancy, a small-town obituarist
- Michael Smiley as Ward Clancy, her father (series 1)
- Ronan Raftery as Emerson Stafford, a journalist investigating a cold-case murder in the town. He later becomes Elvira's boyfriend.
- Danielle Galligan as Mallory Markum, Elvira's best friend (series 1)
- David Ganly as Hughie Burns
- Máiréad Tyers as Vivienne Birch, the new editor of the paper (series 2)
- Noni Stapleton as Detective Rose (series 1–2, recurring)

== Episodes ==
Series	Episodes	Originally released
1	6	26 September 2023
2	6	14 October 2025

=== Series 1 (2023) ===
No. overall	No. in series	Title	Original release date
1	1	"Death Becomes Her"	26 September 2023
2	2	"Hiccups"	26 September 2023
3	3	"Stay of Execution"	26 September 2023
4	4	"Weapons of Minor Destruction"	26 September 2023
5	5	"Wild Goose Chase"	26 September 2023
6	6	"Body Count"	26 September 2023

=== Series 2 (2025) ===
No. overall	No. in series	Title	Original release date
7	1	"The Bad Sleep Well"	14 October 2025
8	2	"A Brain Full of Razor Blades"	14 October 2025
9	3	"It Doesn't Count as a Crime if You Had Fun"	14 October 2025
10	4	"The Principle of Two Weaknesses"	14 October 2025
11	5	"The Wrongful Prolongation of Life"	14 October 2025
12	6	"WRH?"	14 October 2025

== Reception ==
Obituary received positive reviews. It received 100% on Rotten Tomatoes, based on six reviews. In The Irish Times, Ed Power praised Siobhán Cullen's and Danielle Galligan's performances, but said "it's a shame the script isn't funnier. Obituary is a dark comedy that often forgets the laughs."

At the 20th Irish Film & Television Awards, Obituary was nominated for Best Drama, Best Director (John Hayes), Best Script (Peter McKenna), Best Actress in a Lead Role (Siobhán Cullen), Best Actor in a Lead Role (Michael Smiley) and Best Actress in a Supporting Role (Danielle Galligan), but did not win any. Siobhán Cullen won a Rising Star award, in part for her work on Obituary.
