= 6th Irish Film & Television Awards =

Annual Irish film and television awards ceremony

- Date: 14 February 2009
- Site: Burlington Hotel, Dublin
- Hosted by: Ryan Tubridy

Highlights
- Best Film: Hunger
- Best Actor: Michael Fassbender; Hunger
- Best Actress: Eileen Walsh; Eden
- Most awards: Hunger (6); The Tudors (6)
- Most nominations: Hunger (8); The Tudors (8)

The 6th Irish Film & Television Awards took place on 14 February 2009 at the Burlington Hotel in Dublin, and was hosted by Ryan Tubridy. It honoured Irish film and television released in 2008.

== Awards in Film ==
Film

- Hunger (Winner)
  - 32A
  - A Film with Me in It
  - The Escapist
  - Kisses

Director Film

- Lance Daly – Kisses (Winner)
  - Ian Fitzgibbon – A Film with Me in It
  - Martin McDonagh – In Bruges
  - Declan Recks – Eden

Script Film

- Martin McDonagh – In Bruges (Winner)
  - Lance Daly – Kisses
  - Mark Doherty – A Film with Me in It
  - Enda Walsh – Hunger

Actor in a Lead Role Film

- Michael Fassbender – Hunger (Winner)
  - Colin Farrell – In Bruges
  - Brendan Gleeson – In Bruges
  - Dylan Moran – A Film with Me in It

Actress in a Lead Role Film

- Eileen Walsh – Eden (Winner)
  - Jenn Murray – Dorothy
  - Kelly O'Neill – Kisses
  - Saoirse Ronan – City of Ember

Actor in a Supporting Role Film

- Liam Cunningham – Hunger (Winner)
  - Stuart Graham – Hunger
  - Gerard McSorley – Anton
  - Peter O'Toole – Dean Spanley

Actress in a Supporting Role Film

- Saoirse Ronan – Death Defying Acts (Winner)
  - Sarah Bolger – The Spiderwick Chronicles
  - Lesley Conroy – Eden
  - Ger Ryan – Dorothy

George Morrison Feature Documentary Award

- Waveriders (Winner)
  - Gabriel Byrne: Stories From Home
  - Saviours
  - Seaview

International Film

- In Bruges (Winner)
  - The Boy in the Striped Pyjamas
  - Man on Wire
  - WALL-E

International Actor

- Robert Downey Jr. – Iron Man (Winner)
  - Casey Affleck – Gone Baby Gone
  - Josh Brolin – W.
  - Ralph Fiennes – The Duchess

Pantene Best International Actress Award – People's Choice

- Meryl Streep – Mamma Mia! (Winner)
  - Angelina Jolie – Changeling
  - Kristin Scott Thomas – I've Loved You So Long
  - Emma Thompson – Brideshead Revisited

== Awards in Television Drama ==
Single Drama/Drama Serial

- Whistleblower (Winner)
  - George Gently
  - The Last Confession of Alexander Pearce
  - Little White Lie
  - School Run

Drama Series / Soap

- The Tudors (Winner)
  - The Clinic
  - Fair City
  - Raw
  - Ros na Rún

Director Television

- Ciaran Donnelly – The Tudors (Winner)
  - Dermot Boyd – Whistleblower
  - Dearbhla Walsh – Little Dorrit
  - Kieron J. Walsh – Raw

Script Television

- Graham Linehan – The I.T. Crowd (Winner)
  - Stuart Carolan & Barry Murphy – Little White Lie
  - Rob Heyland – Whistleblower
  - Peter McKenna – The Clinic

Actor in a Lead Role Television

- Aidan Gillen – The Wire (Winner)
  - Dominic Mafham – The Clinic
  - Jonathan Rhys Meyers – The Tudors
  - Stanley Townsend – Whistleblower

Actress in a Lead Role Television

- Charlene McKenna – Raw (Winner)
  - Elaine Cassidy – Little White Lie
  - Charlene McKenna – Whistleblower
  - Deirdre O'Kane – Bitter Sweet

Actor in a Supporting Role Television

- Peter O'Toole – The Tudors (Winner)
  - Michael Fassbender – The Devil's Whore
  - David Herlihy – The Clinic
  - John Kavanagh – George Gently

Actress in a Supporting Role Television

- Maria Doyle Kennedy – The Tudors (Winner)
  - Orla Brady – Mistresses
  - Hilda Fay – Whistleblower
  - Amy Huberman – The Clinic

== Craft / Technical Awards ==
Costume Design

- Joan Bergin – The Tudors (Winner)
  - Driscoll Calder – 32A
  - Eimer Ní Mhaoldomhnaigh – Brideshead Revisited
  - Leonie Prendergast – Kisses

Director of Photography

- PJ Dillon – 32A (Winner)
  - Seamus Deasy – A Film with Me in It
  - Owen McPolin – Little Dorrit
  - Fergal O'Hanlon – Anton

Editing

- J. Patrick Duffner – Kisses (Winner)
  - Shane Sutton – Fight or Flight
  - Ben Yeates – Raw
  - Gareth Young – Eden

Make Up & Hair – sponsored by M·A·C

- Sharon Doyle & Dee Corcoran – The Tudors (Winner)
  - Eileen Buggy & Morna Ferguson – George Gently
  - Joni Galvin & Muriel Bell – Dorothy
  - Liz Byrne – Kisses

Original Score

- David Holmes – Hunger (Winner)
  - David Holmes – Cherrybomb
  - Stephen McKeon – Niko and the Way to the Stars
  - Anna Rice – Anton

Production Design

- Tom McCullagh – Hunger (Winner)
  - Tom Conroy – The Tudors
  - John Paul Kelly – The Other Boleyn Girl
  - David Wilson – Dorothy

Sound

- Ronan Hill & Mervyn Moore – Hunger (Winner)
  - Brendan Deasy – A Film with Me in It
  - John Fitzgerald, Patrick Drummond & Caoimhe Doyle – Niko and the Way to the Stars
  - Paul Maynes, Niall Brady & Garret Farrel – Waveriders

== Awards in Television ==
Children's / Youth Programme

- Aifric (Winner)
  - Aisling's Diary
  - Funky Fables
  - Quizone

Current Affairs

- Cocaine (Prime Time Investigates) (Winner)
  - A Lost Boy (Spotlight)
  - Slave Labour Ireland (Prime Time Investigates)
  - Teen Bullying (Prime Time Investigates)

Documentary Series

- Bertie (Winner)
  - Death or Canada
  - How the Irish Have Sex
  - Mobs Mhericeá

Single Documentary

- Cromwell in Ireland (Winner)
  - Brian Keenan: Back to Beirut
  - Patrick McCabe: Blood Relations
  - Pimpernel sa Vatican

Entertainment Programme

- The Apprentice (Winner)
  - The Panel
  - The Podge and Rodge Show
  - Tubridy Tonight

Factual Programme

- In the Name of the Fada (Winner)
  - Ballet Chancers
  - Celebrity Bainisteoir
  - Who Do You Think You Are?

Sport

- Troid Fhuilteach (A Bloody Canvas) (Winner)
  - Brief Encounters of the Sporting Mind
  - Euro 2008
  - Road to Croker... With Bertie Ahern

== Others ==
Animation

- Granny O'Grimm's Sleeping Beauty (Winner)
  - Days Like This
  - Niko and the Way to the Stars
  - On The Air: Hypnotised Hen

Short Film

- The Door (Winner)
  - An Ranger
  - Martin
  - Of Best Intentions

Special Irish Language

- In the Name of the Fada (Winner)
  - Aifric
  - Fairytale of Kathmandu
  - Seacht

Rising Star Award, sponsored by Bord Scannán na hÉireann/the Irish Film Board

- Michael Fassbender – Actor (Winner)
  - Sarah Bolger – Actor
  - Lance Daly – Writer/Director
  - Enda Walsh – Writer

Industry Lifetime Contribution Award

- George Morrison
