= Charlene McKenna =

Irish actress

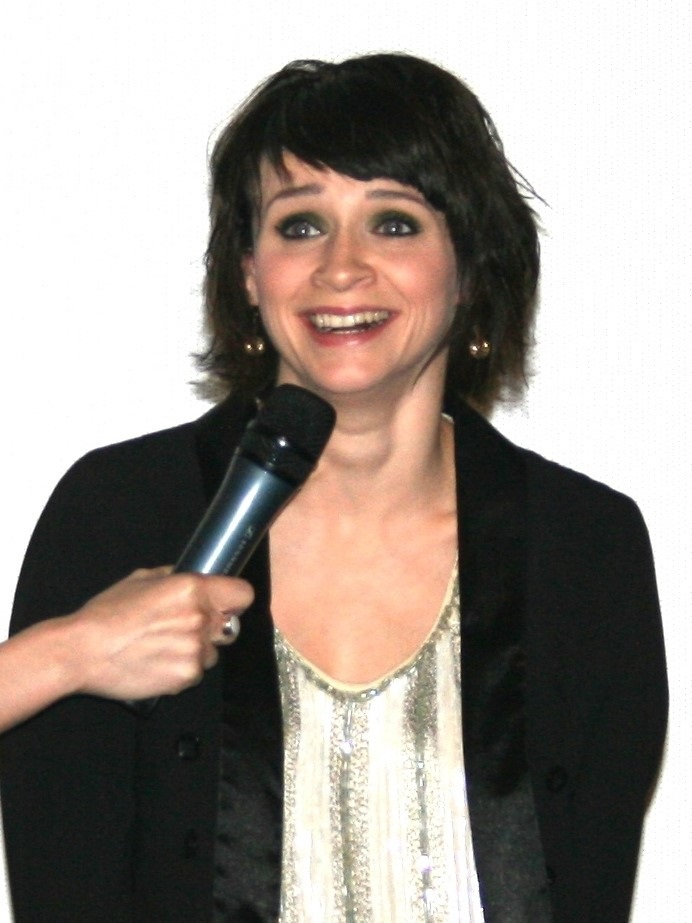
- McKenna in 2008
- Born: Charlene Lee McKenna; 26 March 1984 (age 42); Glaslough, County Monaghan, Ireland
- Occupation: Actress
- Years active: 2005–present
- Spouse: Adam Rothenberg (m. 2021)
- Children: 2

Charlene Lee McKenna (Irish: Searlaoin Nic Chionaoith; born 26 March 1984) is an Irish actress. She became a household name in Ireland after starring as Jennifer Jackson in the miniseries Pure Mule (2005). She appeared on Irish television in Single-Handed 2 (2008), Whistleblower (2008), and Raw (2008–2013). For Raw, she won Best Actress (Television) at the Irish Film & Television Awards, and for Whistleblower, she won Outstanding Actress in a Mini-Series at the Monte Carlo Television Festival.

Since 2009, McKenna has appeared on British television as Rose Erskine in the BBC mystery drama Ripper Street (2012–2016), Leah Liebermann in the BBC psychological thriller Vienna Blood (2019–present), Laura McKee in series five and six of Peaky Blinders (2019–2022), and DS Niamh McGovern in the BBC police procedural Bloodlands (2021–2022)..

== Early life and education ==
McKenna grew up in Glaslough, County Monaghan where her parents owned a mushroom farm and later The Pillar House pub. She has five older brothers. She attended St Louis Secondary School in Monaghan before going on to study Classical Music and Religious Education at Mater Dei Institute of Education in Dublin. However, she deferred her third year to make time for her career before withdrawing from the course altogether.

== Career ==
McKenna first appeared on stage at the age of eleven, playing a small role in Oklahoma! with the Monaghan Youth Theatre. Her first large-scale production was Pure Mule which launched her career. She played Jennifer Jackson, a racy character, in the series. She also appeared in The Old Curiosity Shop, a 2007 ITV adaptation of the Charles Dickens novel of the same name starring Derek Jacobi, Toby Jones, Bradley Walsh, Zoë Wanamaker, Martin Freeman, Steve Pemberton, Anna Madeley and Gina McKee.

In 2007, she appeared in the short Danger High Voltage at the Electric Picnic music festival in Stradbally, County Laois. The film, which also starred Barry Ward and was directed by Luke McManus, went on to win awards at both the Galway Film Fleadh and the Cork Film Festival in 2008. McKenna also appeared as Mary McMahon in Dorothy Mills.

She appeared in the second episode of Single-Handed 2, broadcast on 1 January 2008, in which Garda Sergeant Jack Driscoll investigated the case of the missing two-year-old son of her character, Eilish. Eilish also had to endure several resentful in-laws. This performance was described as "outstanding".

Whistleblower, a two-part fact-based drama broadcast in August 2008, was based on the late 1970s scandal at Our Lady of Lourdes Hospital in Drogheda, County Louth, involving gynaecologist Michael Neary. McKenna played Karen, a young mother who has an unnecessary hysterectomy performed on her after giving birth. Emma Stansfield played the nurse who blew the whistle. McKenna won the Outstanding Actress in a Mini-Series award for her role in Whistleblower at the Monte Carlo Television Festival in June 2009.

McKenna starred in the RTÉ series Raw. Scenes involving restaurant staff tampering with their guests' food failed to attract much complaint. McKenna's character in the series is Jojo, a young chef, working under Tanya, a stressed manager, and a head chef. In the second episode, Jojo organises a party but the alcohol runs out and tensions rise. Raw, a six-part series set in a fictitious restaurant in Dublin, saw McKenna interact with Bachelors Walk actor Keith McErlean and Mistresses actress Shelley Conn. McKenna won the Best Actress (Television) award for her role in Raw at the Irish Film & Television Awards in February 2009. McKenna departed Raw following the Season 5 finale on 10 February 2013.

In 2009, McKenna played the role of Paula Abbot in the second series of The Fixer. In 2010, McKenna portrayed the young version of Josie, the love interest of vampire John Mitchell (Aidan Turner) in BBC supernatural comedy-drama Being Human. In 2011, McKenna appeared in an episode of Channel 4 comedy-drama Sirens. She played the eponymous antagonist "Lamia" (/lɑːmiːə/) in the eighth episode of the fourth season of Merlin. She starred as Seth's dead girlfriend Shannon in Misfits. In 2013, she appeared on Skins Pure as Maddie. Between 2012 and 2016, McKenna appeared as Rose Erskine in BBC mystery drama Ripper Street. In 2015, McKenna played Eva in A.D. The Bible Continues.

In 2019, McKenna appeared in the role of Leah Liebermann in BBC crime drama Vienna Blood. In February 2021, McKenna played a lead role as Detective Sergeant Niamh McGovern in the BBC police procedural drama series, Bloodlands.

== Personal life ==
McKenna announced her engagement to American actor Adam Rothenberg in 2019. They were married in January 2021 at Castle Leslie adjacent to McKenna's hometown. They have 2 children. McKenna splits her time between Monaghan, New York, and London.

== Filmography ==
=== Film ===
Year	Title	Role	Notes
2005	Breakfast on Pluto	Caroline Braden	
2006	Middletown	Adele	
2006	The 18th Electricity Plan	Mia	Short film
2006	The Tiger's Tail	Samantha	
2006	Small Engine Repair	Melanie	
2007	Kitchen	Kirsty Dunne	TV movie
2007	The Old Curiosity Shop	The Marchioness	TV movie
2008	Danger High Voltage	Sarah	Short film
2008	Dorothy Mills	Mary McMahon	
2009	A Boy Called Dad	Nia	
2010	Inn Mates	Maisie	TV movie
2012	Henry	Claire	Short film
2012	Jump	Marie	
2012	The Nightclub Days	Drew	
2014	Ghosts	Regina Engstrand	Live recording of stage production at Trafalgar Studios
2014	Boogaloo and Graham	Mother	Short film
2015	Clan of the Cave Bear	Iza	TV movie
2017	The Date	Sinead	Short film
2023	A Greyhound of a Girl	Tansey	Voice

=== Television ===
Year	Title	Role	Notes
2005	Pure Mule	Jennifer Jackson	Miniseries
2006	Stew	Various characters	1 episode
2007	Prosperity	Natasha	Episode: "Gavin's Story"
2007	Coming Up	Aisling	Episode: "99, 100"
2008	Single-Handed 2	Eilish	2-part series
2008	Whistleblower	Karen	
2008–2013	Raw	Jojo Harte	
2009	The Fixer	Paula	1 episode
2009	Pure Mule: The Last Weekend	Jennifer Jackson	
2010	Being Human	Josie	1 Episode
2011	Sirens	Angie	Episode: "Two Man Race"
2011	Merlin	Lamia	Episode: "Lamia"
2011	Misfits	Shannon Speers	1 episode
2012–2016	Ripper Street	Rose Erskine	Main role
2013	Skins Pure	Maddie	Special episode
2015	A.D. The Bible Continues	Eva	Supporting role; 6 episodes
2017	Stan Lee's Lucky Man	Clare Cartmell	Episode: "What Lies Beneath"
2018	Death and Nightingales	Mercy Boyle	Miniseries
2019	Bump	Liz	Pilot
2019–present	Peaky Blinders	Captain Swing	Guest, series 5 Main, series 6
2019–present	Vienna Blood	Leah Liebermann	Supporting role; 6 episodes
2021–2022	Bloodlands	Detective Sergeant Niamh McGovern	Main role
2022	Holding	Evelyn Ross	4 episodes
2023	Clean Sweep	Shelly Mohan	6 episodes

== Awards and nominations ==
Year	Association	Category	Nominated work	Result	Ref.
2009	Monte Carlo Television Festival	Outstanding Actress in a Drama Series	Raw	Nominated	
2009	Monte Carlo Television Festival	Outstanding Actress in a Mini-Series	Whistleblower	Won	
2009	Irish Film & Television Awards	Best Actress in a leading Role - Television	Whistleblower	Nominated	
2009	Irish Film & Television Awards	Best Actress in a leading Role - Television	Raw	Won	
2010	Irish Film & Television Awards	Best Actress in a leading Role - Television	Pure Mule: The Last Weekend	Nominated	
2011	Irish Film & Television Awards	Best Actress in a leading Role - Television	Raw	Nominated	
2013	Irish Film & Television Awards	Irish Film & Television Award for Best Supporting Actress – Film	Jump	Nominated	
2017	Irish Film & Television Awards	Best Actress in a leading Role - Drama	Ripper Street	Nominated	
