= Kathy Rose O'Brien =

Irish actress

- Born: Ireland
- Occupation: Actress
- Years active: 2006–present

Kathy Rose O'Brien is an actress from Dublin, Ireland, who has appeared in the Irish television drama Whistleblower, which dealt with the controversial events at Our Lady of Lourdes Hospital in Drogheda relating to obstetrician/gynecologist Michael Neary, and in theatre productions including Leaves, The Burial at Thebes, The Birthday Party, The Fall of Herodias Hattigan and The Plough and the Stars. She holds a BA (Hons) in Drama and Theatre Studies from The Samuel Beckett Centre, Trinity College Dublin and graduated from the Royal Academy of Dramatic Art in 2006.

== Biography ==
Kathy Rose is an Irish actress who trained at The Royal Academy of Dramatic Art (RADA) in London. She is also a graduate of The Samuel Beckett Centre, Trinity College Dublin.

Upon graduating RADA she played Cockney girl-next-door, Lulu, in Harold Pinter's The Birthday Party at the Bristol Old Vic Theatre.

Working next with The Druid Theatre Company, playing Lori in Lucy Caldwell's Leaves directed by Tony-award winning director Garry Hynes at The Royal Court Theatre in London, she was nominated for an Irish Times Irish Theatre Award for Best Supporting Actress.

She is a founding member of Women in Film and Television Ireland.

RTE Television received record viewing figures for its two-part drama Whistleblower. Kathy Rose played Marie, one of the whistleblowing nurses suspicious of a doctor's (Stanley Townsend) medical practice in this hard-hitting show.

Kathy Rose has worked extensively at The Abbey Theatre, the National Theatre of Ireland, amongst many roles she played Rosie Redmond in Sean O'Casey's The Plough and The Stars and Ismene in Seamus Heaney's The Burial at Thebes. She had the title role in Ellamenope Jones: The Musical written and directed by Wayne Jordan and workshopped and performed in ThisIsPopBaby's hit musical Alice in Funderland which took over The Abbey Theatre in 2012. She sang, danced and puppeteered in ANGLO: The Musical at The Bord Gais Energy Theatre.

One of her favourite roles was lifting Molly Allgood, the heroine of best-selling author Joseph O'Connor's novel Ghost Light, off the page in numerous performances to celebrate the Dublin UNESCO event One City One Book.

Television credits include Chasing Shadows (ITV), George Gently (BBC) and The Legend of Longwood which screened at the Irish Film Festival in Boston, USA. The RTE/Filmbase short film "Leave", which she stars in alongside Moe Dunford, premiered at the 2015 Galway Film Festival.

Kathy Rose is a voice-over and audiobook artist and a regular performer on both RTE Radio's Drama On One and The Book on One.

She has spoken at events including the World Actors Forum in Dublin in 2013, where she was a panellist alongside Penelope Wilton and Kirsten Sheridan.

Recent London theatre work includes Cinders in Baddies: The Musical by Marc Teitler and Nancy Harris at The Unicorn Theatre and the title role of Kate in The Taming of The Shrew at Shakespeare's Globe directed by Caroline Byrne.

Kathy Rose is an accomplished voice-over and audiobook artist and a regular performer on both RTE Radio's Drama On One and The Book on One. She won the New York Festivals Gold Radio Award for Narration of "The Little Pen Pal" in 2018.

Kathy Rose worked with Olivier award-winning director Rachel O'Riordan in "Come On Home" by Phillip McMahon at The Abbey Theatre in Summer 2018. She is one of 6 actors performing in "Theatre For One" produced by Landmark Productions (in a co-production with Octopus Theatricals) at the Cork Midsummer Festival 2019.

Kathy Rose has just devised and curated one of the first exhibitions at the new Museum of Literature Ireland (MoLI) in Dublin, on 20th century Irish novelist Kate O'Brien. "Kate O'Brien: Arrow To The Heart" will run until early 2020.

== Theatre ==
In 2007, O'Brien appeared in the Druid Theatre Company production of Leaves, written by the Belfast playwright and novelist Lucy Caldwell and directed by Garry Hynes. For this performance, she received a nomination for Best Supporting Actress in the Irish Times Irish Theatre Awards in 2007.

She played Rosie Redmond in the Seán O'Casey play, The Plough and the Stars at Dublin's historic Abbey Theatre in 2010

=== Selected stage credits ===
- Lulu; The Birthday Party(Bristol Old Vic).
- Mr Kolpert, Platonov; The Rep Experiment: Dublin Fringe Festival, (Once-Off Productions).
- Herodias; The Fall of Herodias Hattigan (Dublin Fringe Festival).
- Ismene; The Burial at Thebes (Abbey Theatre).
- Nurse Bryant; Captain Oates' Left Sock (the Finborough Theatre).
- Margerie Powers; Handel's Crossing (Fishamble Theatre).
- Ellamenope Jones; (Randolf SD The Company)

== Television ==
In 2008, O'Brien played Marie, a nurse, in the award-winning television drama, Whistleblower, based on actual events at Our Lady of Lourdes Hospital in Drogheda, County Louth in the 1990s, where Michael Neary, an Irish consultant obstetrician/gynecologist, was struck off the Register of Medical Practitioners for professional misconduct relating to the performance of caesarian hysterectomies.

O'Brien also appeared in the BBC's detective series, George Gently in an episode entitled "Bomber's Moon".

In 2014, she portrayed Sara Shah in the ITV mini-series, Chasing Shadows.

== Film ==
O'Brien's film credits include the short films The Orange (2006) and Daughter of the Brotherhood (2007).
