= Black '47 (film) =

2018 period drama film

- Theatrical release poster
- Directed by: Lance Daly
- Screenplay by: PJ Dillon; Pierce Ryan; Eugene O'Brien; Lance Daly
- Story by: PJ Dillon; Pierce Ryan
- Produced by: Macdara Kelleher; Tim O'Hair; Arcadiy Golubovich; Jonathan Loughran; Jani Thiltges; Martin Metz
- Starring: Hugo Weaving; James Frecheville; Stephen Rea; Freddie Fox; Barry Keoghan; Moe Dunford; Sarah Greene; Jim Broadbent
- Cinematography: Declan Quinn
- Edited by: John Walters; Julian Ulrichs
- Music by: Brian Byrne
- Production companies: Wildcard Distribution; Fasnet Films; Primierdian Entertainment; Irish Film Board; Premiere Picture; Samsa Film; Umedia; Sea Around Us; Film Fund Luxembourg; BAI
- Distributed by: Element Pictures
- Release dates: 16 February 2018 (Berlin Film Festival); 7 September 2018 (Ireland)
- Running time: 100 minutes
- Countries: Ireland; Luxembourg
- Languages: English; Irish
- Box office: $2 million

Black '47 is a 2018 period drama film directed by Lance Daly. The screenplay is by PJ Dillon, Pierce Ryan, Eugene O'Brien and Lance Daly, based on the Irish-language short film An Ranger, written and directed by Dillon and Ryan. The film stars Hugo Weaving, James Frecheville, Jim Broadbent, Stephen Rea, Freddie Fox, Barry Keoghan, Moe Dunford, and Sarah Greene. Set in Connemara during the Great Irish Famine, the film follows an Irish Catholic soldier who has been fighting for the British Army abroad, as he deserts his regiment to reunite with his family. The title is taken from the most devastating year of the famine, 1847, which is referred to as "Black '47".

Black '47 held its world premiere on 2 March 2018 at the Berlin Film Festival, before being released on 7 September 2018 in Ireland by Element Pictures. The film received generally positive reviews from a number of critics, and was a box-office success in Ireland.

== Plot ==
Hannah (Weaving) is a veteran of the British army who is working as an investigator for the Royal Irish Constabulary (RIC). While drunkenly interrogating a member of the Young Ireland movement, Hannah loses his temper over the prisoner's refusal to identify his accomplices and strangles him. He is subsequently arrested and sentenced to hang.

Martin Feeney (Frecheville) is a former Connaught Ranger who served in Afghanistan and India and who is returning to Connemara, in the west of Ireland, in 1847. On his arrival home, the country is experiencing the worst year of the Great Famine. Feeney finds his mother has died of starvation and his brother has been hanged, having stabbed a bailiff during his family's eviction. Feeney stays with Ellie (Greene), his brother's widow, who is squatting with her three children in one of the few houses still standing, and makes plans to emigrate to America and take his brother's family with him. Before they can leave, agents of the local Anglo-Irish landlord and members of the RIC arrive to remove them from the cottage. During the eviction, the house roof is destroyed, Feeney is arrested and his nephew is killed. Feeney is brought for interrogation by the RIC but manages to kill his captors and burns down their barracks. He returns to the house to find his sister-in-law and her daughter have died of exposure following a snowfall.

The destruction of the barracks draws the attention of British authorities, who suspect Feeney is responsible. Feeney is revealed to have deserted the Rangers in Calcutta and Captain Pope (Fox), an arrogant British officer of the 68th Regiment, is assigned to apprehend him with the aid of Hannah, who served with Feeney in Afghanistan. Hannah is compelled to assist in the hunt with the promise he shall be spared the noose, although his feelings are conflicted as Feeney saved his life during the war. They are joined by the young idealistic English Private Hobson (Keoghan), and later hire Conneely (Rea), a knowledgeable local, to act as an Irish translator. They track Feeney as he hunts down those he blames for the deaths of his family: a local rent collector, the judge who sentenced his brother, and a Protestant preacher who is inflicting Souperism by offering soup to the starving on condition they convert.

Pope's group catch up with Feeney at the home of Cronin (McArdle), the land agent who oversaw his family's eviction, but he escapes after Hobson fails to shoot him when he has the chance. Reasoning that Feeney's next target is the landlord, Lord Kilmichael (Broadbent), the group travels to the estate house to warn him. Putting a large bounty on Feeney's head and surrounding himself with armed police, led by the violent Sergeant Fitzgibbon (Dunford), Kilmichael vows to accompany his grain harvest to the railway station, where it will be shipped abroad. Outraged by the sight of people starving outside the gates, Hobson threatens a policeman's life to allow the starving people crowded outside the guarded gates to enter for food. Although Hannah and Pope try to reason with him, Hobson is shot dead by Fitzgibbon and the police. Kilmichael, accompanied by the armed police and the remainder of Pope's posse, stays at an inn en route to Dublin. Feeney attacks in the night but falls for a trap set by Pope, who is sleeping in Kilmichael's bed. When Hannah cannot bring himself to shoot him, Feeney is able to again escape. As he flees, Feeney takes Lord Kilmichael as a hostage and Hannah is arrested by Fitzgibbon.

The following morning, after he refuses to speak under interrogation, Hannah is brought out to the yard to be summarily executed by firing squad but is saved when Feeney attacks. After the soldiers shoot him from his horse, they are stunned to find that they have instead killed Lord Kilmichael, who had been dressed in Feeney's clothes and mounted on his horse. In the chaos, the starvelings storm the yard and take the grain, a number of local bounty hunters turn against Kilmichael's men, and Hannah is freed by Conneely. Fitzgibbon shoots Feeney but is choked unconscious in a brawl. Hannah steals a horse and attempts to get the wounded Feeney to safety, but Feeney is fatally shot by Pope and dies shortly after their escape. As he is dying, he laments the fate of his family and his country and implores Hannah not to continue the fight, but to instead go to America as Feeney had once intended to do. Seeking vengeance, Hannah follows the badly wounded Pope as he returns to Dublin but stops at a fork in the road, where a group of people bound for America have gathered. Among them is Feeney's last remaining relative, his young niece. Pope rides down one path, as the emigrants start down the other. The film ends without showing which path Hannah takes.

== Cast ==
- Hugo Weaving as Hannah - An inspector with the Royal Irish Constabulary and former British Soldier.
- James Frecheville as Martin Feeney - An Irishman and former Corporal of the Connaught Rangers, who deserts his regiment and returns home.
- Jim Broadbent as Lord Kilmichael - Anglo-Irish landlord in Connemara.
- Stephen Rea as Conneely
- Freddie Fox as Captain Pope - A British Army officer of the 68th Regiment of Foot stationed in Ireland.
- Moe Dunford as Fitzgibbon
- Barry Keoghan as Private Hobson, 68th Foot.
- Sarah Greene as Ellie
- Andrew Bennett as Beartla
- Colm Seoighe as Swineherd
- Ronan O'Connor as Red McCormack
- Ciaran Grace as Ó Sé
- Dermot Crowley as Judge Bolton
- Sheila Moylette as The Registrar
- Aidan McArdle as Cronin
- Michael Reed as Peasant (uncredited)

== Production ==
Black '47 received funding from many private and public production companies, including the Irish Film Board, alongside Film Fund Luxembourg, and the Council of Europe's Eurimages.

The film is an adaptation from the 2008 Irish language short film An Ranger, starring Owen McDonnell and written and directed by PJ Dillon and Pierce Ryan, who co-wrote the screenplay.

"Black '47" refers to the year 1847, when death and emigration resulting from starvation, plague and disease lead to the most dramatic population decrease in the entire period of the Great Hunger in Ireland.

In an interview, Daly highlighted that no film on the Great Hunger had been made for the big screen previously, despite its significance to Irish history, stating, "Given the singular importance of the Great Hunger in Irish history, and that it has never been seen on our cinema screens before, our cast and crew felt a huge responsibility to make a film that was not only historically accurate and emotionally true..." Later, at the Berlin Film Festival press conference, he added that he was compelled to make a film about "the most important period of Irish history but it was difficult to find a way in, to address the horrors of that time, hard to do it justice".

=== Casting ===
On 29 November 2016, the ensemble cast was announced, including Hugo Weaving, Jim Broadbent and James Frecheville among others.

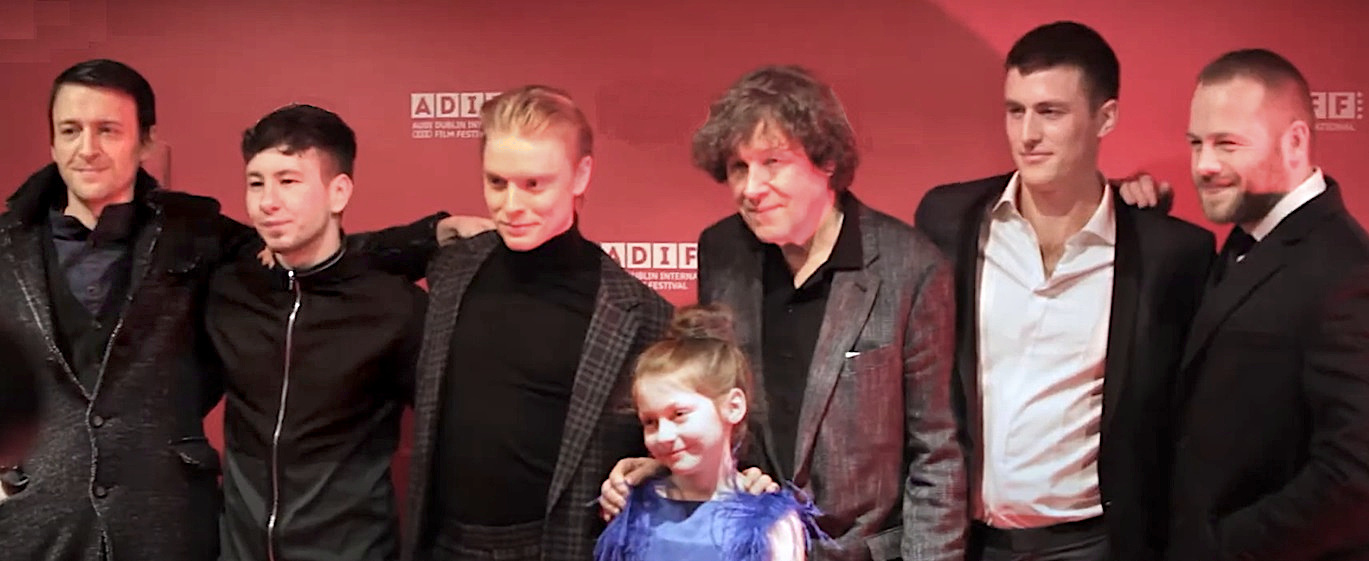
Black '47 cast at ADIFF 2018

Auditions for background extras were held on 23 November 2016 in Temple Bar Dublin. However, on 11 January 2017, casting for background extras renewed.

In preparation for the role, Frecheville, an Australian actor, had to learn Irish. In an interview, he discussed the challenges of playing Irish, stating "It's hard to say where the challenge was because it was all challenging. It was all very cold. I'm not so good at learning languages so to pick up a language that not a great number of people speak was pretty tough, but apparently, I passed a few tests but I still have to see what the public thinks." Keoghan also prepared for his role, revealing he had limited his eating of solid foods and survived on glucose drinks to lose weight for the role.

=== Filming ===
Filming took place between 28 November and 22 December 2016 and from 6 to 28 January 2017 in Connemara and counties Wicklow and Kildare. The "expansive" driveway which leads up to Harristown House in County Kildare, as well as the private estate bridge, appeared in the film.

=== Music ===
The film's score was composed by Brian Byrne. Byrne has previously collaborated with Daly, composing the score for The Good Doctor. Stephen Rea performed the traditional song Little Jimmy Murphy, arranged by Lance Daly and Peadar Cox.

== Release ==
Black '47 held its world premiere at the Berlin Film Festival on 16 February 2018. On 9 May 2018, the film was presented at the Cannes Film Festival. On 21 February 2018, the film was screened at the Dublin International Film Festival. It was also screened at several festivals across Ireland, including the Dingle International Film Festival on 24 March 2018, the Belfast Film Festival on 12 April 2018, and the Galway Film Fleadh on 15 July 2018. The film premiered in North America at the Toronto International Film Festival on 6 September 2018. The film also had a screening at a special event at the Irish Film Institute as part of the art and film exhibition on the Famine in Ireland.

The film's first trailer was released on 27 July 2018.

The film was released in Ireland on 7 September 2018 by Wildcard Distribution. It was released on 28 September 2018 in the United Kingdom by Altitude Film Distribution and StudioCanal and in the United States by IFC Films.

== Reception ==
=== Box office ===
As of 28 September 2018, Black '47 has grossed over €1 million in Ireland. In its opening weekend in Ireland, the film grossed €444,000. It had the highest-grossing opening weekend for a film since the 2015 film Brooklyn. It also became the highest-grossing Irish film in Ireland.

=== Critical response ===
Black '47 received generally positive reviews from critics with many praising its depiction of a difficult subject in the Irish Famine, along with its extensive use of the Irish language, gritty visual style, and the performances of Frecheville, Weaving and Rea. However, some British critics were less positive, including criticism for bias. On review aggregation website Rotten Tomatoes, the film holds an approval rating of 78% based on 55 reviews, and an average rating of 6.8/10. The site's critical consensus reads, "Black '47 anchors its grim and gritty action in deceptively deep genre storytelling, although its epic ambitions arguably exceed its grasp." Another aggregation site, Metacritic, reported a score of 65, representing 'generally favorable reviews'.

Donald Clarke of The Irish Times gave the film 4 out of 5 stars. Paul Whitington of the Irish Independent gave the film 4 out of 5 stars. Glenn Kenny of The New York Times described Black '47 as: "handsomely staged and shot, us[ing] the Irish famine of 1847 as the setting for a fast-paced, well acted and occasionally exhilarating tale of revenge." Peter Bradshaw of The Guardian gave the film 4 out of 5 stars, praising Frecheville's "coldly terrifying performance" as "a Ned Kelly figure of insurgent justice", and though the film is "a viscerally tough and uncompromisingly violent picture" it is also "a gripping piece of storytelling". Niall O'Dowd called the film "essential viewing for Irish-Americans": "It is a must-see movie for those who value their heritage and history. In that dreadful genocide was the seed of the Irish nation that would spread worldwide."

Simon Abrams of RogerEbert.com was much less positive, describing the film as 'The paint-by-numbers Irish revenge thriller "Black 47" is essentially "First Blood" in period dress.' He also noted the 'cringe-worthy expository dialogue' and described Martin as a 'character whose only sympathetic qualities are his unrestrained anger and proficiency at murdering people. It's entirely possible that Martin makes more sense to Irish viewers, since they can presumably relate with Martin's anti-British sentiments better than this reviewer did. Unfortunately, in the film, Martin often comes across like any other crazed, but ostensibly relatable antihero who wracks (sic) up kills and then slumps over in pseudo-tragic exhaustion.' Simran Hans of The Guardian described the film as 'weak', and rated it 2 out of 5. Alistair Harness of The Scotsman was also critical, noting 'Black 47 on the other hand wants to be the Irish Braveheart. Set against the backdrop of the Great Famine and featuring Australian leads and an unashamedly biased view of history, the film manages to turn human tragedy into a gnarly action film.' Kevin Maher of The Times concluded 'Black 47 is a deeply silly action film'. Robbie Collin of The Daily Telegraph summarised the film as 'an overbaked, über-glum Irish famine thriller', along with a rating of 2 out of 5.

== Historical inaccuracies ==
While Black 47 is a fictional film set during factual historical events, there are some historical inaccuracies purported in the film. These include:

- The motives behind Hannah murdering a captive Young Irelander during interrogation is questionable considering the violence from the Young Ireland rebellion did not take place until a year later in 1848 as opposed to what is suggested in the film.
- The film states that Feeney had served in Afghanistan with the Connaught Rangers and later deserted from India. The 88th Regiment of Foot (Connaught Rangers) were garrisoned in the West Indies in 1847 and had been in Malta for 7 years before that, the regiment had not served in India since 1800.
