= Steve McDonald (Coronation Street) =

Fictional character from Coronation Street

- Coronation Street character
- Portrayed by: Simon Gregson
- Duration: 1989–present
- First appearance: 6 December 1989
- Introduced by: Mervyn Watson
- Spin-off appearances: Text Santa (2013); Streetcar Stories (2014); First Dates for Children in Need (2021)
- Crossover appearances: Corriedale (2026)
In-universe information
- Occupation: Taxi driver Businessman; Barman; Pub landlord
- Father: Jim McDonald
- Mother: Liz McDonald
- Stepfather: Vernon Tomlin (2007–2009)
- Brothers: Andy McDonald
- Sisters: Katie McDonald
- Half-brothers: Ben Driscoll
- Wife: Vicky Arden (1995–1996); Karen Phillips (2001–2003, 2004–2006); Becky Granger (2009–2011); Tracy Barlow (2012–2013, 2018–2026); Michelle Connor (2015–2017)
- Sons: Ruairi McDonald; Oliver Battersby
- Daughters: Emma Brooker; Amy Barlow
- Stepsons: Ali Neeson; Ryan Connor (adoptive)
- Grandfathers: Edward McDonald; George Greenwood
- Grandmothers: Maisie McDonald; Nancy Greenwood
- Aunts: Eileen McDonald
- Nephews: Ollie Driscoll; Will Driscoll

Steve McDonald is a fictional character from the British ITV soap opera Coronation Street, played by Simon Gregson. The character first appeared on-screen during an episode airing on 6 December 1989. He arrived as part of the McDonald family, introduced by producer Mervyn Watson along with his twin brother Andy (Nicholas Cochrane) and parents Liz (Beverley Callard) and Jim McDonald (Charles Lawson). For the first year on the Street, the character was credited by the actor's real surname Gregory, before changing to Gregson from early 1991 onwards. Steve is Coronation Street's most married character, having been married seven times to five women: Vicky Arden (Chloe Newsome), Karen McDonald (twice) (Suranne Jones), Becky McDonald (Katherine Kelly), Michelle Connor (Kym Marsh), and Tracy Barlow (twice) (Kate Ford). In September 2015, Gregson announced a break for personal reasons, and Steve was off-screen from November 2015 to 22 April 2016.

Steve's other storylines include his many failed relationships: with Fiona Middleton (Angela Griffin), Ronnie Clayton (Emma Stansfield), and Leanne Battersby (Jane Danson), as well as Tracy giving birth to his daughter Amy (Elle Mulvaney) and his depression. He also has a son, Oliver, with Leanne, whom he impregnated whilst his wife Michelle was pregnant with Ruairi. However, Ruairi was stillborn. In 2019, Steve and Tracy struggled to cope when their then 14-year-old daughter, Amy, fell pregnant by gang member Tyler Jefferies (Will Barnett). Steve later discovered that hairdresser Emma Brooker (played by Alexandra Mardell) is his biological daughter from his relationship with Fiona, 20 years before Emma arrives in Weatherfield. In 2020, Steve and Leanne discovered that their 3-year-old son Oliver had mitochondrial disease, which later claimed his life.

== Casting ==
Gregson began his time in Coronation Street at the age of fifteen in 1989, when he and Nicholas Cochrane were selected to play the teenage twin sons of a new family in The Street.

Gregson makes a cameo appearance as himself in Red Dwarf: Back to Earth, in which the main characters track down Craig Charles (who plays Dave Lister in Red Dwarf and Steve's Street Cars colleague Lloyd Mullaney in Coronation Street) on the set of the soap.

In September 2015, it was announced that Gregson had taken an extended break from the show for "personal reasons" and that Steve would be off-screen for several months. He would also not appear in the upcoming live episode, but would feature in the episodes on either side of it. Steve departed in November 2015 and returned in April 2016. In a 2023 interview, Gregson revealed his break was due to panic attacks.

In October 2022, Gregson broke his leg in six places while at his home. He said, "I've broken my leg. I literally just went over and rolled my ankle, outside the back of the house. It was done in six places." When Gregson did return, the storyline had to be adjusted to his injury.

== Development ==
=== Relationships ===
==== Fiona Middleton ====
After Steve's relationship with Vicky Arden (Chloe Newsome) ends, he decides to pursue Fiona Middleton (Angela Griffin). Gregson reckoned she was a good match for his character, as he needed someone he could have a good time with and who shared his interests. He also wanted someone who was not looking for a serious relationship. Gregson described Fiona as a female version of Steve, and said, "She's a real woman of the Nineties who knows what she wants. She's also pretty streetwise, which Steve loves." Steve and Fiona's relationship is strained when Fiona becomes fed up with playing hard to get and then shows him up at a party. Griffin said Fiona is giving Steve "a run for his money" and that he is not sure how to react, as he has never met someone like her before. The actress also said that Steve treated Vicky badly, and Fiona will not put up with the same behaviour, which is why she was angry that he treated her as "an unpaid skivvy" at his party.

When Fiona meets Steve's ex-girlfriend Vicky, she immediately sees her as a threat to her relationship. Steve carries on gambling, and it becomes clear that Vicky still has feelings for Steve. Vicky discovers that Fiona and Steve's relationship has been difficult despite them deciding to move in together. Steve promises to stop gambling, but when he learns that Vicky has inherited £240,000, he gets back with her. Griffin believed that Fiona was actually more annoyed at Steve for flaunting his relationship with Vicky in her presence than losing him. She concluded, "I reckon she's had a pretty lucky escape."

==== Karen McDonald ====
Steve began a relationship with Karen McDonald, played by Suranne Jones. Rick Fulton of the Daily Record noted that Karen vows to be more "wily" with her romantic interests after seeing her friend Bobbi "wrapping boyfriend Vikram Desai (Chris Bisson) around her little finger". Her friend and colleague Janice Battersby (Vicky Entwistle) makes a series of bets with Karen regarding how new boyfriend Steve treats her: this culminates in Janice betting Karen that she can get Steve to propose to her. Of the storyline, Jones stated that: "Karen can't believe she's on the verge of getting married for a bet". She characterises Karen as "not the type of girl to back out of a tricky situation" and states that she and Steve find themselves "in a game of bluff" with each "waiting for the other to pull out. Gregson felt the marriage was "quite fitting" and that his character "thinks it's a bit of a laugh". The wedding scenes were filmed on 6 May 2001 and screened on 30 May 2001. Billy Sloan of the Sunday Mail stated that the scenes were "guaranteed to provide a bit of light relief" after serious storylines such as Toyah Battersby's (Georgia Taylor) rape and Alma Baldwin's (Amanda Barrie) cervical cancer diagnosis. Jones felt that Steve was "definitely the man for Karen" as the two characters had "similar personalities". She stated that Karen had dumped her previous boyfriend, Vikram, because he "wasn't racy enough and doesn't have the edge Steve has".

In September 2001, Jones stated that she "[feels] sorry for Steve sometimes" in regard to Karen's negative characteristics. She indicated that she'd "love to see Steve and Karen having the same impact on viewers as Dirty Den and Angie did". In November 2001, the two characters fall out because Karen insults Steve's mother Liz, though they later end up back together. Discussing the success of the pairing, Gregson compared Steve and Karen to "a mini Jack and Vera" with "the shouting and the arguments" and "the feistiness of the characters". He added that Steve and Karen "can't live with each other and can't live without each other". Gregson also remarked that the relationship was "going back to what Coronation Street set out to be" which he felt to be "hen-pecked husbands and very strong women".

==== Becky McDonald ====
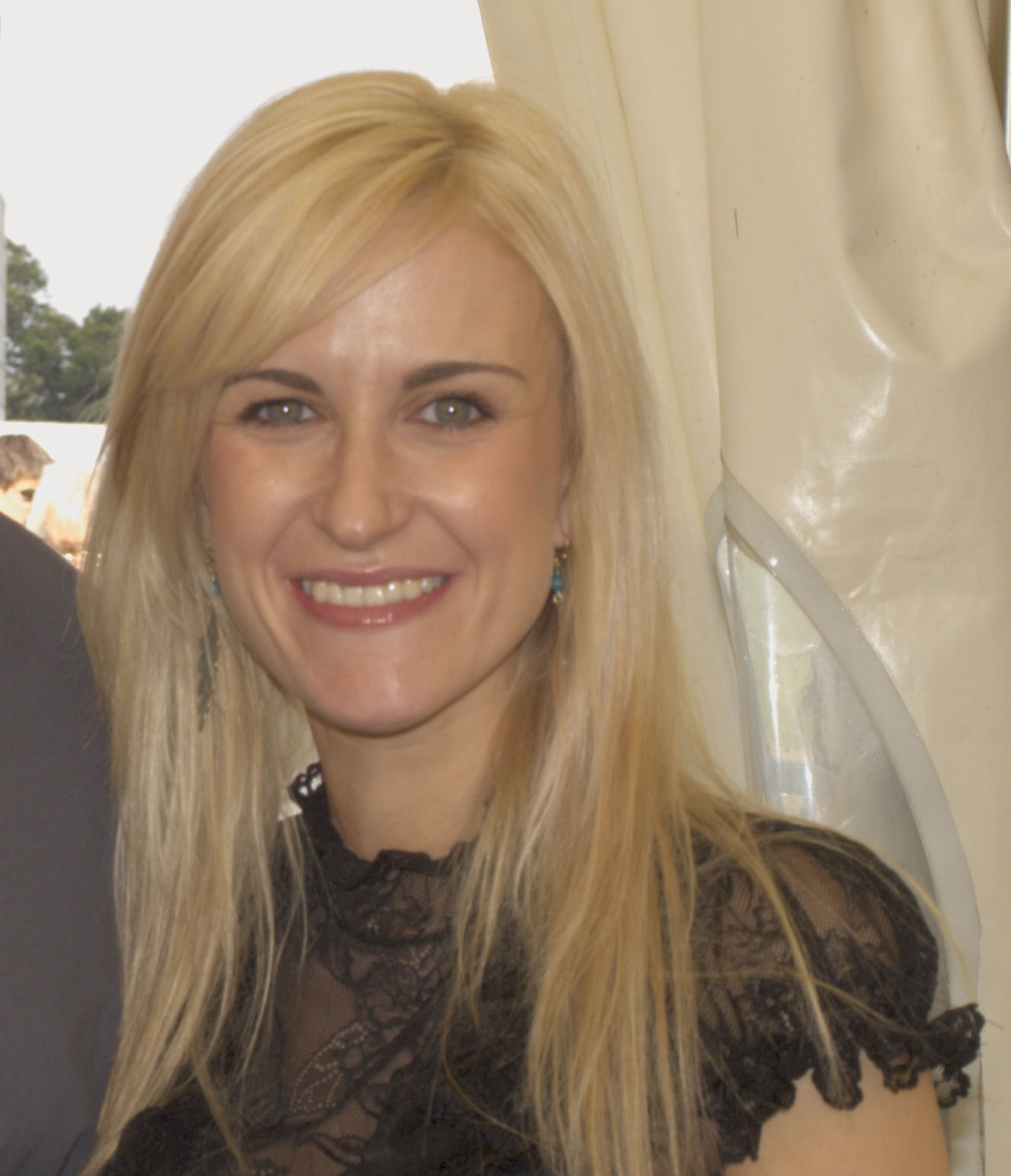
Kelly at the Stoneleigh Park Country Festival in 2008

Steve embarks on an affair with fellow resident Becky McDonald, portrayed by Katherine Kelly. Kelly revealed that she felt Steve was the best man for Becky over her previous lover Jason Grimshaw (Ryan Thomas), stating: "Both boys bring out different things in Becky. With Jason, they liked going clubbing, and it was no strings attached, I think Becky needs more than that, even though she wouldn't admit it. I think, long-term, Steve's better for her." When Gregson was interviewed by entertainment website Digital Spy, he was asked if he thought that Steve has had a positive impact on Becky's life. In reply he stated: "I think he's turned it around. She was all over the place getting into trouble all the time but he's made her grow up. And having a little girl there in Amy, that's made her grow a bit, too. She's got responsibilities now. She's besotted with him. She's still a total pisshead, though!" Steve and Becky attempted to marry twice in 2009, their first wedding was given a promotional push from ITV who aired adverts for the first wedding episodes. Their relationship was featured in a series of romantic plots which ITV dubbed the "Summer of Love" season of the soap, with advertisements airing.

=== Depression and reunion with Michelle Connor ===
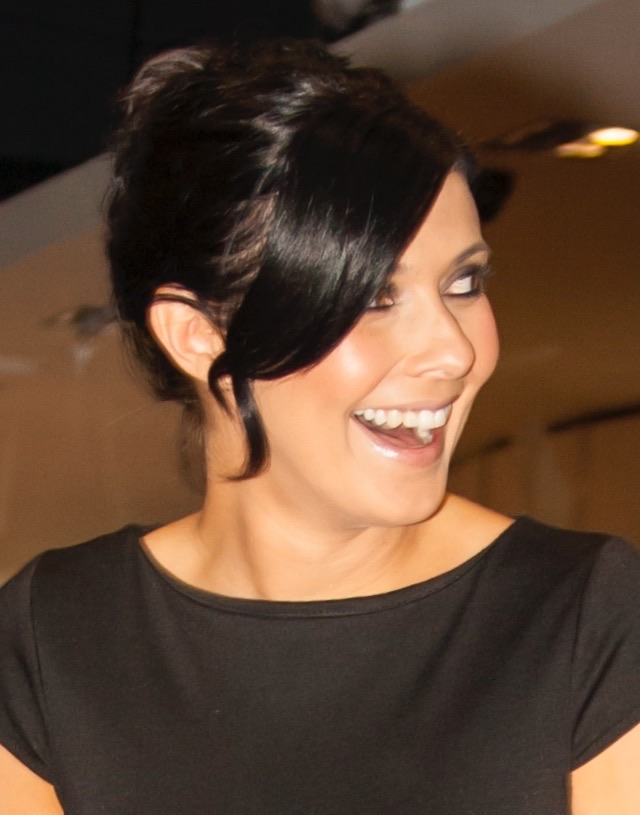
Steve's depression storyline saw him reunite with ex Michelle Connor played by Kym Marsh (pictured)

In 2014, Producer Stuart Blackburn revealed that Steve's depression storyline was going to be a big storyline, stating: "It's going to run through the autumn and build up from there. On Christmas Day and beyond, we'll see a real challenge to Steve and Michelle's relationship. I absolutely know that Simon Gregson and Kym Marsh are very good actors. I hope that the great comedy that Steve brings will absolutely be on screen for the next decade and onwards, but I also wanted to explore a story where Steve looked in the mirror on his 40th birthday and started to wonder whether he was really good enough for Michelle. He also blamed himself for Lloyd's heart attack and he feels guilty for his role in what happened to Tina. Steve is taking a long, hard look at himself and he's not liking what he sees. It's going to run from there, and there will still be comedy in the lead-up as Steve tries to hide away from the demons in his head. Fundamentally what I wanted to do is tell what will hopefully be a really positive, uplifting love story between Michelle and Steve."

In January 2015, it was revealed that Steve would reunite Michelle Connor (Kym Marsh) in the aftermath of the upcoming mini bus crash storyline. It was also confirmed that Steve and Michelle would be the next Weatherfield couple to tie the knot. Speaking of this Marsh said; "I'm delighted, absolutely delighted. It'll be weird after being Michelle Connor for nearly nine years, but it totally makes sense for us as characters. Simon and I love working together, and nobody likes to see us broken up." It was also revealed that Michelle would get "feisty" again when her Steve is blamed for the mini-bus crash.

Marsh also revealed that Michelle and Steve's mother, Liz, would clash over the best course of action for Steve. With Michelle now focused solely on helping Steve to get better with his depression following their reconciliation, she faces opposition from his mother Liz as it becomes apparent that they have very different approaches. While Liz adopts a "tough love" approach with her son, Michelle thinks they should tread more carefully around him, worried about his vulnerable state. Marsh said: "They both obviously want to help Steve but because both of them are so worried about him and love him so much - they both want to help him in their own way. Understandably they clash as they're both so concerned about him. They both have different approaches - Liz is more of the tough love approach and tries to get Steve up and doing things, whereas Michelle is much more trying the softly-softly approach." Marsh added: "Liz doesn't think it's the best way because Michelle is so protective of Steve and doesn't want to hurt or upset him. After everything that's happened with the crash, Michelle thinks they should go easy on him." Despite the disagreement, Marsh believed that the pair would be able to put their differences aside eventually in order to work together to help Steve.

=== Michelle and Leanne Battersby's pregnancies ===
In June 2016, it was announced Leanne Battersby (Jane Danson) would fall pregnant following a one-night stand. The father was revealed as Steve. Gregson said that his character may have gone "a step too far" and that "he has to keep Michelle". Marsh added that her character would "make Steve's life hell" if she found out. Danson said Leanne and Michelle will also be "forced" to be friends after Michelle finds out she is pregnant with Steve's child, and that "it's just really awkward". Danson also stated that Leanne wants to forget the McDonalds and raise the child with Nick. Liz also finds out, and Gail is "thrilled when she finds out" and that the situation, "It's like a little pressure cooker, it's all waiting to blow". Danson also says the storyline "provokes a lot of stories for a lot of other characters and it's how they will deal with the repercussions". Steve being the father will have implications on Leanne and Nick's relationship and a spark a rivalry between Steve and Nick. Producer Kate Oates said "Nick is persistent and Nick adores her" and the storyline will see if they can overcome Leanne being pregnant with another man's child.

== Storylines ==
In December 1989, Steve arrives in Coronation Street at the age of 15, alongside his twin brother, Andy McDonald (Nicholas Cochrane) and parents, Jim (Charles Lawson) and Liz (Beverley Callard).

From the start, the lads are high-energy tearaways, initially causing aggravation for Alf Roberts (Bryan Mosley). Steve and Andy get up to a lot of mischief, including a joyride in an industrial earth mover, which breaks Alf's shop window.

Liz primarily brings the twins up, relatively in the absence of their father, as he works in the army. The boys are generally afraid of their father, as when he is home, he often drinks whiskey and beer and is very hot tempered. Steve grows up showing little respect for his father, but a great deal for his mother. It does not stop him from getting into scrapes, no matter how much it worries his mother.

Schoolboy pranks turn into illegal activities, when Steve is sure he could pull off a scam or two, only to find out that the long arm of the law was only a few steps away. Steve is caught selling stolen car radios, and falls into a bad lot which got his brother, Andy, beat up. Steve runs away with a teenage love to the Lake District, and has to be retrieved and defended against Jim by his mother. The McDonalds do not have a lot of money and this seems to fuel Steve's ambitions, as he is always looking for a way to make money. Steve starts working with Jim in a building business, but Jim is drinking a lot, and during an argument and scuffle on scaffolding, Jim falls into a skip and becomes temporarily paralysed. Jim's recovers, and things start to improve between him and Steve.

In 2000, he has dealings with local gangster Jez Quigley (Lee Boardman). After learning that Jez killed Tony Horrocks (Lee Warburton) and Des Barnes (Philip Middlemiss), Steve decides to testify against him in court. After Jez is found not guilty, Jez soon plans his revenge against Steve. He lures Steve into a car park where he is savagely beaten by several of Jez's henchmen. After being found by Jim and taken to hospital, Jim takes revenge by beating Jez. Jez later dies from his injuries after making another attempt on killing Steve. Jim is sentenced to eight years for manslaughter. After this, Steve mends his ways.

Steve marries Karen Phillips (Suranne Jones) twice. During his separation from Karen in 2003, he has a one-night stand with Tracy Barlow (Kate Ford), consequently making her pregnant. Tracy gives birth to their daughter Amy (Holly Bowyer and Rebecca Pike), although she initially is named Patience by Roy Cropper (David Neilson) when he is deceived into believing Amy is his daughter. Tracy later decides she wants to bring up her daughter herself, and reveals that Steve is the baby's father, on Steve and Karen's second wedding day. Karen is horrified but later forgives him. Tracy is persistent in causing disruption for Steve and Karen, which continues throughout 2004, until Steve ends his relationship with Karen on Christmas Day, admitting it is getting too much for him.

In March 2005, he briefly dates single mother, Louise Hazel, but the dalliance soon fizzles out partly due to Tracy's presence. For a brief period, he dates Tracy, intending to get parental responsibility for Amy, rather than having feelings for Tracy. Tracy becomes aware of Steve's scheme and attempts to prevent him from being able to see Amy. The case went to court where Steve is granted legal rights to see his daughter.

Steve starts dating former StreetCars employee Ronnie Clayton (Emma Stansfield), a local gangster's estranged wife. Ronnie tries to frame him and Les Battersby-Brown (Bruce Jones) when she accidentally runs down a pensioner in her taxi, but she is eventually caught. Steve's alibi for the crime is that he was spending the night with his new business partner Lloyd's girlfriend, Kelly Crabtree (Tupele Dorgu). This leads to the temporary closure of StreetCars when Lloyd refuses to work with Steve. Lloyd eventually forgives Steve for his deception, and they reopen the business. Later that year, Steve buys The Rovers Return pub from Fred Elliott (John Savident), and installs Liz as landlady, and stepfather Vernon Tomlin (Ian Reddington), as cellarman. Steve takes Amy (now played by Amber Chadwick) after Tracy is sentenced to 15 years in prison for the murder of her boyfriend Charlie Stubbs (Bill Ward).

After proposing to Becky Granger (Katherine Kelly), he organises a quick wedding. Many people disapprove of them marrying because Becky had been engaged to Jason Grimshaw (Ryan Thomas) just before she accepted Steve's proposal. Steve bans Liz and Lloyd Mullaney (Craig Charles) from the wedding after they bet on whether the ceremony would go ahead. In the end, Becky turns up late for the ceremony drunk, rendering her unable to carry out the nuptials. Steve then brings her home in disgrace. The following day, Becky wakes up and, believing that she has been married, hunts for her ring; however, Michelle reveals all in the pub. She later leaves Steve after admitting that it would never work. They later reconcile and begin plans for another wedding.

Steve and Becky have their second wedding. The ceremony goes off without a hitch. However, their happiness is short lived when The Rovers is searched for drugs, which are found in Becky's bag, having been planted by Becky's ex Slug (Marshall Lancaster). She is arrested and taken to jail, however, the charges are later dropped. Steve reveals that he wants another child with Becky, however, she does not want any children of her own, which they consistently begin arguing about. Becky later falls pregnant, leaving the couple without much choice in the matter, however she later suffers a miscarriage. After a second miscarriage, Steve and Becky discover that Becky cannot have children and later decide to adopt. Becky and Tracy, fight at Blanche Hunt's (Maggie Jones) funeral because Becky has become very close to Amy (now played by Elle Mulvaney).

At an adoption panel meeting, Steve and Becky are told that they have been unsuccessful in their bid to adopt, following a bad reference from Becky's half-sister, Kylie Turner (Paula Lane). Steve is not impressed when Becky moves Kylie into the pub to live with them as she is homeless. On Christmas Eve, Steve and Becky are not happy when Tracy returns. When she enters The Rovers, she manages to insult people and Steve has to reprimand and restrain Gail McIntyre (Helen Worth), after Gail starts a fight with her.

On Christmas Day, Amy reveals to Tracy, that Steve and Becky had bought Max (Harry McDermott), Kylie's son. This gave Tracy cause to literally pick Amy up and take her back to No.1 where she says that she was going to ring social services for buying Max. Steve hires a new manager for the pub, Stella Price (Michelle Collins) who moves in with her daughter Eva (Catherine Tyldesley) and her boyfriend Karl Munro (John Michie). Becky discovers this and is annoyed and goes round the pub to take charge and plays loud music and a fight breaks out resulting in the pub window being smashed. Steve returns and is furious to discover what Becky has done and tells her that she does not own the pub any more.

Steve and Becky divorce, and he begins a relationship with Tracy, after she announces that she is pregnant with his child, who later turn out to be twins. After Lloyd leaves the area, Steve and Becky go into business and decide to extend the business when they meet hotel manager Danny Stratton (Jeremy Sheffield). Tracy assumes that they were having an affair and while searching the hotel for them, she collapses at the hotel and miscarries the babies. However, Steve is told that Becky pushed her down the stairs and caused the miscarriage. Steve is very bitter towards Becky and repeatedly accuses her of killing his unborn children, which she strongly denies. He proposes to Tracy on Christmas Day and he buys No. 13 from Lloyd and they move in and he and Becky get divorced. Steve and Tracy marry but, at the wedding reception in The Rovers, Becky gives Steve a copy of Tracy's medical records, proving that she lied about Becky causing her miscarriage. Steve is disgusted with Tracy and tries to stop Becky leaving with Danny for Barbados, but fails and he watches as they board the plane. Steve angrily tells Tracy he wants their marriage annulled and that he loves Becky, not her. Steve's attempts to get the annulment fail as he needs her co-operation and cannot file for divorce for a year. Worse still, he finds himself unable to kick her out of No. 13 as the deeds are in joint names. Unwilling to move out of his own house, Steve remains and tries to persuade Tracy to move out but she won't either so Steve has the house converted into two flats but Tracy threatens to call the council as he didn't apply for planning permission so that is reversed. However, Steve then allows Beth Tinker (Lisa George) and her son, Craig (Colson Smith), to move in with Tracy and Amy. He thought this would make Tracy move out but she ends up becoming friends with Beth, so he sells the house to Kevin Webster (Michael Le Vell), who is looking for somewhere for him and his son after splitting from his wife a few months before. When Steve mentions he needs the house cleaned, Kevin's daughter Sophie (Brooke Vincent) offers and Steve accepts her offer. While Sophie is cleaning, her old friend Ryan Connor (Sol Heras) helps her and while having a cigarette, Steve's curtains are set on fire. Steve and Ryan's mother, Michelle, catch them trying to put out the fire. Afterwards, Kevin tells Steve he isn't interested in buying the house as Steve refused to pay for them.

Steve begins to develop feelings for Michelle Connor (Kym Marsh) and does not believe Tracy when she complains that she is ill until she is hospitalised, after collapsing from kidney failure. She tells Steve she still loves him and begs him to stay by her bedside until she wakes up from her sleep. Steve reluctantly does but after helping Michelle deal with Ryan, they share a kiss, unaware that Amy has seen them. Michelle urges Steve to tell Tracy the truth, but he only tells her that he wants to live life on his own. Deirdre came out and furiously told Tracy everything: the kiss and making Amy promise not to say anything, and Tracy is heartbroken. The next day, Steve explains everything to Tracy, saying that nothing has changed between them and he loves Michelle. Tracy tells Steve he's being a fool, but all she got back was an apology for not being honest with her earlier. Steve and Michelle move into 4b Victoria Court. In September 2013, Stella puts The Rovers up for sale, and Steve decides to put an offer down to cheer up Michelle, who is down in the dumps at the moment. Although she is angry that he kept it a secret, she eventually comes round to the idea of being the landlady, and is given a 50% share of the place. When Liz returns, she is given the role of assistant manager and is seen behind the bar more often than Steve and Michelle. The reason for this is that Steve still has his taxi-firm business, StreetCars and is struggling to cope with running two businesses. Michelle advise Steve to sell his share of the taxi-firm to his friend and current business partner, Lloyd, which he agrees to.

In December 2013, when Michelle's friend, Carla Connor (Alison King), marries Steve's friend, Peter Barlow (Chris Gascoyne), Steve and Michelle help plan the wedding, which prompts them to begin a party planning business together. However, a few months later, Steve is shocked to discover that Peter is having an affair with Tina McIntyre (Michelle Keegan). When the truth is revealed, Carla says that she is going to kill Tina and is prime suspect in her murder investigation when she is found lying dead on the pavement. When Michelle discovers that Steve knew about Tina and Peter's affair, she dumps him, packs her bags and moves in with Carla. However, they get back together within a week and begin to save up for a holiday home in Spain.

In January 2015, Steve is diagnosed with clinical depression. Not wanting Michelle to have to cope with him, he decides to end their relationship without giving her any explanation. This leads Michelle to believe that he does not love her anymore. Whilst driving the Underworld staff to an awards' ceremony for Carla to accept an award, Steve is chased by some boy racers who eventually cut him up and cause him to swerve. Steve crashes the minibus, leaving the staff trapped in the wreckage. Steve is the first person to awaken from unconsciousness, and wanders off to leave the others to deal with the traumatic situation. Whilst at the hospital, Steve tells Michelle that he has depression and that this is the reason why he ended their relationship. Michelle promises to help him recover.

In March 2015, Michelle discovers that Steve owes £10,000 in tax which he had been ignoring for the past few months. Liz's boyfriend, Tony Stewart (Terence Maynard) offers to lend him the money to clear his debt, but after starting an affair with Tracy, the couple plan to take the Rovers from the McDonald's. Tony lies to Steve and tells him that he needs his money back to pay off some loan sharks. Subsequently, Steve proposes to Michelle in the back room of The Rovers. However, Steve is convinced that Michelle does not really want to marry him, and only said yes out of pity, so he calls off the engagement. Later, Steve finds a candlelight dinner prepared in the back of The Rovers, and he assumes that Tony has prepared the meal for Liz, and calls Tony out in front of a busy pub at the Butler Auction. Michelle then confesses that it was actually her who had prepared it for both of them, and calls Steve up onto the stage to explain that she had said yes to him because she loves him. Michelle then proposes to Steve, getting the engagement back on track.

In May 2015, after some persuasion from Liz, a reluctant Steve agrees to sell his share of the Rovers to a company called "Travis Limited", who, unbeknownst to everyone, is actually Tony. Tony then persuades Liz into selling her share of the pub to Travis Ltd, in order to start a new life in Spain. However, Michelle's best friend Carla steps in and offers to buy Liz's share of the pub, which not only settles Michelle's worries about being kicked out of their home, but Liz accepts asking Tony why it would be better to sell to a stranger rather to someone that they know and trust. Carla then promises to keep Steve and Michelle as pub managers. On 26 May 2015, after seven years in an on-and-off relationship, Steve and Michelle finally marry.

Steve leaves to stay with Andy for a while in Spain. He later returns for Michelle's birthday. Steve is furious with Michelle when he learns that she kissed an ex-boyfriend, Will Chatterton (Leon Ockenden). Michelle plans to leave for a job on a cruise ship when her attempts to get Steve to forgive her fail. Steve and Michelle later reconcile. Steve has sex with Leanne Battersby (Jane Danson) and she becomes pregnant. Steve tells Liz that he got Leanne pregnant and explains it was one night stand that he thought Michelle had gone to cruise ship. Leanne informs Steve of her intention to keep the unborn child. Steve decides to keep his involvement a secret and having nothing to do with the unborn child. Michelle then expresses an interest of having children of their own. Steve agrees to have a baby after speaking to Dev Alahan (Jimmi Harkishin). Michelle then also falls pregnant, but unfortunately delivers their baby boy, Ruairi, at 23 weeks. The baby does not survive, leaving both Michelle and Steve devastated. Michelle then finds out that Leanne's baby, Oliver, is Steve's, after their one-night stand, Michelle then leaves and divorces Steve for good, unable to forgive him. Steve finds out that Michelle is now in a relationship with Tracy's ex-husband, Robert Preston (Tristan Gemmill) to his dismay. Michelle then begins a relationship with Robert and divorces Steve. He then tries to make a go of things with Leanne, so they can be a family, due to them having Oliver. Steve proposes and Leanne accepts. They both later realise their relationship won't work as they don't love one another, but agree to be friends. Steve then starts dating Tracy again, despite the disapproval of Liz and Amy. Steve and Tracy eventually remarry. After the New Year, Amy tells both Steve and Tracy that she is pregnant at 14 years old which horrifies Steve, leading him to accuse Aadi Alahan (Zennon Ditchett) and Amy's cousin Simon Barlow (Alex Bain) of impregnating her. However, it was shortly revealed that Simon's arch enemy Tyler Jefferies (Will Barnett) is the biological father. After learning Tyler is 17 years old, Steve realises Tyler could legally go to prison for having sex with a minor. However, Steve respects Amy's wishes by not taking legal proceedings.

A few months later Steve is done with Tracy and gets romantically involved with Cassie Plummer (Tyrone's mum) Tracy and Amy walk into the kitchen and see Cassie and Steve as he kisses Cassie grossing out Tracy and Amy. It heats up when the two make love in the kitchen only to be caught by Cassie's son Tyrone.

== Other appearances ==
A four-part spin-off series entitled Street Car Stories was released in February 2014 and featured comic scenes between Steve and Lloyd Mullaney (Craig Charles) in the Street Cars cab office.

In November 2021, Steve appeared in a non canon sketch of Channel 4 show First Dates with EastEnders’ character Janine Butcher in aid of Children in Need.

== Reception ==
Steve McDonald has proven to be one of the most popular characters on the Street in recent years due to high-profile storylines, such as his dodgy dealings with Jez Quigley and his explosive relationships with Karen McDonald and Tracy Barlow. At the 2004 Inside Soap Awards, the Tracy/Steve baby secret won the 'Best Storyline' gong. The presence of the McDonald family on Coronation Street and Steve in particular have been singled out for praise. Critic Tony Stewart praised the episodes in which Steve discovered that Lloyd and Liz were having a fling, calling it "pure comedy gold, full of wicked laugh-out-loud one-liners..." Ian Wylie has been very impressed with Simon Gregson's performance as Steve saying, "his on screen performance remains as fresh as the day he started".

Over the years, storylines involving Steve McDonald have received some negative backlash. In 2002, the Broadcasting Standards Commission criticised Coronation Street for being "unacceptably menacing" in regard to the hospital scene where Steve was threatened by Jez Quigley, broadcast two years previously. A spokeswoman for the soap defended the controversial storyline saying; "We are a realistic drama and we did flag up the fact there was going to be violence in the Steve McDonald episode. We are mindful that Coronation Street has a large family audience and endeavour to appeal to young and old at all times."

In February 2009, Steve McDonald was voted the nation's favourite soap character in a poll conducted by The People newspaper. Talking about the victory Gregson stated; "Oh my God, I am chuffed. I'm delighted people enjoy watching Steve and the scrapes he gets into. And I'm pleased people like to watch him as much as I love playing him."

Gregson was nominated in the category of "Best Actor" at The British Soap Awards 2011. He won the "Funniest Male" award at the 2013 Inside Soap Awards. He also won "Best Comedy Performance" at The British Soap Awards 2014. In August 2017, Gregson was longlisted for Best Actor and Funniest Male at the Inside Soap Awards, while the death of Steve and Michelle's son was longlisted for Best Show-Stopper and Steve revealing himself as Oliver's father was longlisted for Best Shock Twist. While Steve revealing himself as Oliver's father did not make the shortlist, Gregson's three other nominations did. Gregson did not win any awards at the ceremony.
