= Sheila Hodgers =

- Born: 1956 or 1957
- Died: 19 March 1983
- Occupation: Housewife
- Spouse: Brendan Hodgers
- Children: 3

Sheila Hodgers (1956/57 (Note: The Irish Independent states she died aged 26, though misstating her year of death as 1980.) – 19 March 1983) was an Irish woman from Dundalk, County Louth, who died of multiple cancers two days after giving birth to her third child. She was denied treatments for her cancer while pregnant because the Catholic ethos of the hospital did not wish to harm the foetus. Her case was publicised in an article in The Irish Times the week before a September 1983 referendum which enshrined the right to life of the foetus in the Constitution of Ireland. The case has been recounted in subsequent pro-choice commentary on abortion in Ireland.

In August 1981, Hodgers detected a breast lump and was referred to Our Lady of Lourdes Hospital, then run by the Medical Missionaries of Mary, a Catholic order of nuns. Some time after a lumpectomy there, her husband Brendan was told by the surgeon that a second tumour had been found which would be fatal if a mastectomy wasn't performed. Even with the operation, there was a strong chance of secondary tumours appearing. The operation was carried out and considered a success. Hodgers was prescribed a course of anti-cancer drugs and advised not to use the contraceptive pill as this could cause her cancer to return. According to journalist Padraig Yeates, Brendan Hodgers claimed a consultant told him that "as Sheila had a clean bill of health, (pregnancy) shouldn't be a problem". The consultant himself denied this. According to Yeates, every medical expert he spoke to said that following a mastectomy, it was standard advice to tell a woman to wait at least two years before becoming pregnant.

One year after the operation, Sheila Hodgers became pregnant. Since the anti-cancer drugs she was taking could harm the foetus, she was stopped from taking them. Hodgers began experiencing severe back pains and could hardly stand. Her husband urged the hospital to induce her pregnancy or perform a Caesarian section but they refused as it would damage the foetus. They also refused painkillers. The hospital had to abide by an alleged "Bishop's Contract", a code of ethics drawn up with the Catholic Church. During her time at Our Lady of Lourdes Hospital, Hodgers was attended to by at least seven doctors. Her husband said the only doctor there he trusted was Michael Neary.

According to Brendan Hodgers: "I went to see Sheila one night and she was in absolute agony. She was literally screaming at this stage. I could hear her from the front door of the hospital and she was in a ward on the fourth floor. I saw the sister and she produced a doctor who said nothing that made any sense."

Sheila Hodgers was subsequently moved to the maternity unit and given painkillers. According to Brendan, he at this point asked if an abortion could be performed but was given no answer. The couple again asked if an induction or Caesarian could be performed, and were again told the baby would not survive.

On 17 March 1983, Hodgers gave premature birth in extreme agony to a baby girl, Gemma, who immediately died. Hodgers died two days later from cancer in her neck, spine, legs, liver and ribs.
