= Hereford Sixth Form College =

Location
- Folly Lane; Hereford, Herefordshire, HR1 1LU; England; 52°03′47″N 2°41′56″W

Information
- Type: Sixth form college
- Established: 1973
- Local authority: West Midlands LSC
- Department for Education URN: 130718 Tables
- Ofsted: Reports
- Principal: Catherine Brearey
- Staff: 170 (approx.)
- Gender: Co-educational
- Age: 16 to 19
- Enrolment: 2,000 (approx.)
- Website: www.hereford.ac.uk

Hereford Sixth Form College is a co-educational state funded sixth form college in Hereford, England.

It offers over 40 subjects at A-Level and 10 at GCSE. It is on the A465 in Aylestone Hill, in the east of Hereford, opposite Wye Valley Nuffield Hospital and next to Hereford College of Arts and Herefordshire and Ludlow College. Aylestone School, (Formerly Aylestone Business and Enterprise College) the former boys' and girls' grammar schools, is adjacent to the east. The college was founded in 1973 as the main provider of sixth form education in Hereford and the surrounding area and also attracts students from Abergavenny to Worcester and Brecon. The college moved into new, purpose-built facilities in 1974 which have since been extended. The School won "Sixth Form College of the Year" in the 2016 TES FE Awards.

Former principal Jonathan Godfrey was appointed an OBE for services to education in the 2013 New Year's Honours list.

== Activities ==
- Drama - the college has its theatre group; Upstage Production Company (recent productions include Prometheus Bound and Anastasia: The Musical, both in 2021.)
- Duke of Edinburgh Award group
- SRC - Student Representative Council
- Music - Academia Musica choral and instrumental programmes for the students, including regular concerts alongside the English Symphony Orchestra and international and national tours
- Sports - Rugby Academy, Football Academy as well as competitive teams in netball and hockey, and programme of sports, including badminton, basketball, five-a-side football, table tennis, trampolining and volleyball which take place during lunch times.
- A purpose-built and fully staffed fitness centre (Sixth Sense Fitness)
- The Student Voice - an online newspaper written by the students
- The Rant - a political newsletter written and produced by students
- Debate Society - regular debates held by the students on topical subjects
- Earthquake Monitoring Service
- Model United Nations
- An annual mock election

== Notable alumni ==
- Ellie Goulding, musician
- Paul Keetch, Liberal Democrat Member of Parliament from 1997 to 2010 for Hereford
- Lucy Letby, serial killer
- Warwick Murray, professor of geography, Distinguished New Zealand Geographer medal holder, musician
- Stafford Murray, sports scientist, professor, head of Team GB Olympics analysis, director of insights at English Cricket Board, world #1 squash player (junior)
- Mary Rhodes, BBC television presenter
- Ruth Sherlock, journalist
- Emma Stansfield, actress, played Veronica 'Ronnie' Clayton in the soap opera Coronation Street
- Alex Price, Danny Swailes Football Academy CEO
- Rachel Whitear, drug overdose victim, known for a mass drug awareness campaign in UK schools.
- Greg Tannahill, core member of Mischief Theatre.
