= Whistleblower (Irish TV series) =

- Louise, as portrayed by Emma Stansfield
- Genre: Thriller
- Written by: Rob Heyland
- Directed by: Dermot Boyd
- Starring: Emma Stansfield; Stanley Townsend; Adrian Dunbar; Charlene McKenna; Patrick Ryan; Paul Meade; Ingrid Craigie
- Composer: Ray Harman
- Country of origin: Ireland
- Original language: English
- No. of series: 1
- No. of episodes: 2

Production
- Executive producers: Kathryn Lennon; Lesley McKimm
- Producers: Siobhan Bourke; Peter Norris
- Cinematography: Ciarán Tanham
- Editor: Ray Roantree
- Running time: 90 minutes
- Production company: Saffron Pictures

Original release
- Network: RTÉ One
- Release: 31 August – 1 September 2008

Whistleblower is a two-part Irish television IFTA-winning fact-based drama, broadcast on RTÉ One for two consecutive nights in 2008, which focuses on the Michael Neary scandal that first erupted in the 1990s. Neary, a retired Irish consultant obstetrician and gynaecologist, gained notoriety when it was discovered that he had performed what was considered an inordinate number of caesarian hysterectomies during his time at Our Lady of Lourdes Hospital in Drogheda, County Louth.

Whistleblower follows the obstacles encountered by a midwife Louise (Emma Stansfield) as she blows the whistle on Neary (Stanley Townsend)'s irregular obstetric practices. The series was written by Rob Heyland, directed by Dermot Boyd, produced by Siobhán Bourke and Peter Norris and researched by Sheila Ahern. The first episode, broadcast at 21:30 on 31 August 2008, drew in a third of the available audience across all platforms.

== Production ==
The series was based upon the activities of Dr. Michael Neary, a former consultant obstetrician and gynaecologist, who was considered to have performed an inordinate number of caesarian hysterectomies during his time at Our Lady of Lourdes Hospital in Drogheda, County Louth. A subsequent inquiry found that Neary had carried out 188 peripartum over a period of 25 years, some on very young women of low parity. The average consultant obstetrician carries out five or six of these operations in their entire career.

== Reception ==
The series' broadcast prompted the support group Patient Focus to renew its call on the Irish government for every woman affected by Neary's actions to be included in the Lourdes hospital redress scheme.

RTÉ were also criticised for airing the series too soon after the conclusion of Neary inquiry, and for making the in-depth script too "upsetting for" all those involved. The commissioning editor of drama with the national broadcaster, Jane Gogan, attempted to justify the broadcast, commenting that; "RTÉ hopes to convey to a wider audience the human cost of the injustices which were exposed, and to illustrate the power of the individual in affecting change".

== Cast ==
- Emma Stansfield as Louise
- Stanley Townsend as Dr. Michael Neary
- Adrian Dunbar as Florence Wycherley
- Charlene McKenna as Karen
- Patrick Ryan as Sean
- Paul Meade as Dr. Muriston
- Ingrid Craigie as Shelagh Hodnett
- Sandra Ni Bhroin as Elaine
- Janice Byrne as Jacinta
- Michèle Forbes as Nuala
- Simon Keogh as Brian
- Catriona Lynch as Lauren
- Michael McElhatton as Miller
- Lise Ann McLaughlin as Frances
- Kathy Rose O'Brien as Marie
- Owen Roe as Dillon

== Episodes ==
No.	Title	Directed by	Written by	Airdate
1	"Episode 1"	Dermot Boyd	Rob Heyland	31 August 2008
Midwife Louise discovers a high number of hysterectomies being carried out at the hospital where she works by renowned surgeon Dr. Michael Neary, and subsequently decides upon reporting her suspicions.
2	"Episode 2"	Dermot Boyd	Rob Heyland	1 September 2008
The aftermath of the revelations continues as Louise receives threatening notes and phone calls. As more cases come to light, one victim of malpractice takes her case against Dr. Neary to the High Court.

== Awards ==
Year	Nominee / work	Award	Result
2009	Whistleblower	Best Single or Serial Drama	Won
