= Quizone =

Irish TV show

- Quizone logo
- Directed by: Lisa McGrath
- Country of origin: Ireland
- Original language: English
- No. of seasons: 5
- No. of episodes: 61 (list of episodes)

Production
- Running time: 2006-2011
- Production company: Vision Independent Productions

Original release
- Network: RTÉ
- Release: 2006 – 2011

Quizone is an Irish TV series that aired on RTÉ2 it was shown in the afternoon on The Den from 2006 to 2011. The show was directed by Lisa McGrath and produced by Vision Independent Productions. Quizone was nominated for an award at the 6th Irish Film & Television Awards for "Best Children's/Youth Programme".

== Plot ==
Three teams (a red team, a blue team and a yellow team) of five children were all asked the same question. Four people were challenged to find the answer to it and tell the fifth person. Four team members on each team were placed in their respective "searchroom" and were tasked with finding the answer by searching on a computer or looking through books they were supplied with while the fifth member of the team made their way through an obstacle course called "The Zone". Before they started the Zone they would need to check in with their team via a pair of headphones to find out the answer and make it to the finish line. The first person to make it to the finish line and correctly answer won that round and earned points for their team, the team with the most points at the end of the episode won. The winner of each episode won an Mp3 player and the winner of the league won a laptop.

Every computer was given access to the internet and the quizone.tv safe search engine. Different routes to the finish line awarded different points. Once a route was chosen, it was sealed off from the other runners. Another way to earn points was by finding the "bonus ball" which was hidden in one of three pouches located in the Zone; the point value of the bonus ball varied from round to round. The first person to make it to the finish line answered first, if they got it wrong the second person to get to the finish line answered, and if they also got it wrong the third person answered. If no one got the answer correct they would have to go back to their searchrooms and a new runner would be selected.

Every episode was narrated by Jon Slattery, while Jamie Darling acted as a referee for the show and also announced the questions. Slattery introduced every episode with the line "Enter the Quizone: the game played on many levels, but there can be only one winning team" before then saying from which part of Ireland the contestants of that episode originated. After that, Darling announced the question that had to be answered. After every runner made it to the finish line, Jamie asked the contestants if they had the answer to the question.

== Production ==
Filming was conducted at The Playbarn in Naas, County Kildare. Kids could apply to join Quizone by filling out a form on The Den's website.

== Reception ==
The Irish Independent described Quizone as "a tough physical and mental challenge for the contestants." Rudi Kinsella of Joe.ie described Quizone as "Saturday morning television at its very best." and stated that "if you were in primary in the 2010s you definitely watched it and probably dreamed of being a contestant on it". Shauna Bannon Ward of RSVP Live claimed that "Every Irish child who watched RTE in the early 2010s remembers Quizone." A writer for The Daily Edge said that Quizone would "forever outrank" The Cube, The Crystal Maze and Jungle Run. In an interview with RTÉ, Craig Fitzgerald from the band The Academic said that "Stephen (Murtagh)'s first brush of fame was on Quizone".
