= Trad (film) =

2025 Irish film

- Theatrical film poster
- Directed by: Lance Daly
- Written by: Lance Daly
- Produced by: Lance Daly
- Starring: Megan Nic Fhionnghaile; Aidan Gillen; Sarah Greene; Peter Coonan; Ann Skelly; Henrique Zaga
- Edited by: John Walters
- Music by: Declan Quinn; Eugene Quinn
- Release dates: July 11, 2025 (Galway); May 8, 2026 (Ireland)
- Running time: 90 mins.
- Country: Ireland
- Languages: English; Irish Gaelic

Trad (stylized as TRAD) is a 2025 Irish comedy music film, written, directed, and produced by Lance Daly. It stars newcomer Megan Nic Fhionnghaile, Aidan Gillen, Sarah Greene, Peter Coonan, Ann Skelly, and Henrique Zaga. It premiered at the Galway Film Fleadh in 2025, before being released in Ireland in 2026.

== Synopsis ==
A gifted young fiddle player runs away with a group of traveling musicians.

== Cast ==
- Megan Nic Fhionnghaile as Shóna McAnally
- Aidan Gillen as Harky
- Sarah Greene as Valerie McAnally
- Peter Coonan as Des McAnally
- Ann Skelly as Nugget
- Henrique Zaga as Frode
- Dallán Woods as Mickey McAnally
- Cathal Coade Palmer as Ray
- Frances O'Mahony as Ash
- Sonny Daly as Cliff
- Siobhán Matshazi as Melly
- Geraldine McAlinden as Trumbella
- Carl Shaaban as Tromboli
- Ruairí Heading as Garda Heading

== Reception ==
Donald Clarke of The Irish Times praised filmmaker Lance Daly for his take on the Irish road movie trope, stating he "attacks the genre with a baggy, crowd-pleasing beast". Stephen Porzio of JOE praised the newcomers Megan Nic Fhionnghaile, Cathal Coade Palmer, and Dallán Woods for their "star-making performances". Irish Central commended the film for having "a clear identity, turning a coming-of-age story into something that feels both intimate and communal".

Peter Bodie of Film Ireland lauded the "fine, naturalistic performances" from the established stars Aidan Gillen, Sarah Greene, Peter Coonan, Ann Skelly, and Henrique Zaga. Rebecca C. of Film Carnage applauded every aspect of the film, awarding it a perfect score of 10/10 or 5/5 stars, stating "It's as if you blended Once with Moonrise Kingdom then filled it with such lively, enrapturing music, to create something unique yet relatable and grounded."

Adrian Scahill of The Journal of Music appreciated that the film "showcased realistic musical interpretation". Chris Wasser of the Irish Independent stated the genre of "teenagers finding their voice through song will never get old". And Sarah Manvel of Movies We Texted About calls the film "an enormous achievement".
