= Jump (2012 film) =

- Directed by: Kieron J. Walsh
- Screenplay by: Steve Brookes; Kieron J. Walsh
- Based on: Jump by Lisa McGee
- Produced by: Brendan J. Byrne; Katie Holly
- Starring: Nichola Burley; Martin McCann; Charlene McKenna; Ciarán McMenamin; Valene Kane
- Cinematography: David Rom
- Edited by: Emer Reynolds
- Production companies: Blinder Films; Cyprus Avenue Films
- Distributed by: Breaking Glass Pictures (USA)
- Release date: 8 June 2012 (Belfast Film Festival)
- Running time: 81 minutes
- Countries: United Kingdom; Ireland
- Language: English
- Budget: £1,300,000 (estimated)

Jump is a 2012 British-Irish mystery drama film set in Derry. The film stars an ensemble cast, including Nichola Burley and Martin McCann. It is based on the stage play of the same name by Lisa McGee.

== Plot ==
The plot revolves around Greta Feeney (Burley), who intends to commit suicide on New Year's Eve, and the interplay of her friends, and her gangster father. The story is framed by a voice-over narrative by Greta.

== Cast ==
- Nichola Burley as Greta Feeney
- Martin McCann as Pearse Kelly
- Richard Dormer as Johnny Moyes
- Ciarán McMenamin as Ross
- Charlene McKenna as Marie
- Valene Kane as Dara
- Lalor Roddy as Frank Feeney
- Packy Lee as Jack
- Kelly Gough as Lucy
- Jonathan Harden as Richie

== Awards ==
- Best Feature at Irish Film New York 2012
- Bridging the Borders Award at the Palm Springs International Film Festival 2013
