= The Halo Effect (film) =

2004 Irish film

- Theatrical film poster
- Directed by: Lance Daly
- Written by: Lance Daly
- Produced by: Macdara Kelleher; Hughie Kelly
- Starring: Stephen Rea; Kerry Condon; Grattan Smith; Simon Delaney
- Cinematography: Ivan McCullough
- Edited by: Flora Agar; Lance Daly
- Music by: GoBlimpsGo
- Release dates: February 22, 2004 (Dublin); November 19, 2004 (Ireland)
- Running time: 97 mins.
- Country: Ireland
- Language: English

The Halo Effect is a 2004 Irish dramedy film, written and directed by Lance Daly. It stars Stephen Rea, Kerry Condon, Simon Delaney, and Grattan Smith. It premiered at the Dublin International Film Festival in 2004, before being released throughout Ireland later that year.

== Synopsis ==
Fatso is the kind-hearted owner of a rather bad take-away place in Dublin. His employees are a bunch of incompetent people, whom he keeps on mostly to help them survive. Also, he has a serious gambling problem resulting in mounting debts, and loan sharks are starting to make his life miserable.

== Cast ==
- Stephen Rea as Fatso
- Kerry Condon as Jean
- Grattan Smith as Mick
- Simon Delaney as Eddie
- John Kavanagh as Stan
- Fiona O’Shaughnessy as Suzie
- Gerard McSorley as O'Grady
- Neilí Conroy as Jackie
- Laurence Kinlan as Thief
- Eanna MacLiam as Crony

== Reception ==
Linda McGee of RTÉ lauded Stephen Rea's performance as being "as ever, convincing and authentic" as Fatso. Oakleigh Irish of Letterboxd praised Kerry Condon's "angelic presence" as Jean.
