= Ronnie Clayton (Coronation Street) =

Fictional character from Coronation Street

- Coronation Street character
- Portrayed by: Emma Stansfield
- Duration: 2005–06
- First appearance: 3 October 2005
- Last appearance: 11 June 2006
- Introduced by: Tony Wood
In-universe information
- Occupation: Taxicab driver
- Husband: Jimmy Clayton (backstory)
- Stepsons: Nick Clayton

Ronnie Clayton is a fictional character from the British soap opera Coronation Street, played by Emma Stansfield. She made her first appearance on 3 October 2005. Stansfield cried when she found out that she received the role as she believed that her life would change forever. Ronnie was introduced as an applicant of Steve McDonald's (Simon Gregson) taxi firm. Steve is instantly smitten by Ronnie and he gives her the job, and they soon begin a romance. The romance is threatened by Ronnie's ex-husband Jimmy Clayton (David Crellin), who ends up nearly killing Ronnie and Steve out of rage. After Jimmy is arrested, Ronnie uses his money to treat Steve, which creates further fear. Ronnie later runs over an elderly man when she is texting whilst driving, which was similar to a 2001 real-life case. After she runs off and the man dies, Ronnie frames Steve for the crime, but she is soon caught and arrested, leading to her departure on 11 June 2006. Stansfield said that she received nice comments from people after she began playing Ronnie. Stansfield enjoyed her time on the soap and believed that it was good experience for her acting career. Stansfield later returned to the soap portraying a different character, Penny Finton, in a 2021 episode.

== Casting ==
The role was played by Emma Stansfield from 2005 to 2006. When Stansfield found that she received the role, she called her parents and burst into tears. She found it "overwhelming" as she knew that her life was going to change. Stansfield was performing in a play when she received the news and this made it difficult for her to remember her lines when she went onstage after hearing the news. Stansfield said in an interview that her favourite soap opera character was Dot Cotton (June Brown) from rival soap EastEnders, but she loved Coronation Street's Betty Turpin (Betty Driver), calling her a "national treasure". Talking about the differences between her and Ronnie, Stansfield believed that they were both "lively and bubbly" and added that Ronnie likes to have a "good time" and is "fun-loving". However, Stansfield commented that she was not as moody as Ronnie and that she was not manipulative like the character. Stansfield commented that her parents were very proud of her and she later brought them to the set, which led to them appearing as extras in the Rovers Return pub. Stansfield appeared in 56 episodes as Ronnie. Stansfield had worked in theatre prior to being cast on the soap and this was the first time that she found her career being featured in the news. Stansfield found the recognition of being in the soap difficult to get used to at first and initially believed that she would not get recognised due to looking "completely different" from her character, but she called the recognition "lovely" and noted that she had received letters from students who wanted to follow a career in acting and that she had since returned to her old comprehensive school to talk to students interested in going into the industry. Stansfield also had to get used to people taking pictures of her in the street, commenting, "At first I was a bit like a rabbit in the headlights, but you have to accept they're just trying to do their job. You sign up for that treatment when you get your contract from Corrie. That's the way it is". In 2021, Stansfield returned to Coronation Street for one episode as a different character, Penny Finton.

== Development ==
=== Introduction and relationship with Steve ===
Ronnie's first appearance aired on 3 October 2005. In her introduction storyline, Ronnie goes to a job interview to work for Steve McDonald's (Simon Gregson) cab firm, Streetcars, and she takes a shine to him. Steve hires Ronnie to work for his cab firm due to her looks rather than her ability instead of hiring a more qualified candidate. Stanfield believed that there was an "instant attraction" between the pair, and revealed that Ronnie is confident and tries to look pretty for the interview to beat out "stiff competition". She also teased that hiring Ronnie could land Steve in "hot water". Stansfield revealed in an interview that taxi drivers would often talk to her about her role and tell her how they believed that Streetcars was run badly and that Steve should be working much harder, with Stansfield commenting that she got the urge to point out that it was not real. It is then revealed that Ronnie has not been honest about her background as her "hard man" ex-husband Jimmy Clayton (David Crellin) announces that he is telling all taxi firms to not hire Ronnie, which leaves the workers "shaken". Ronnie offers to leave but Steve does not let her as he is too interested in her. Stanfield explained that Ronnie just wants a fresh start away from her "miserable" life with Jimmy. Steve and Ronnie cannot control themselves and "throw caution to the wind" and end up kissing and having sex. Stanfield believed that the pair would not regret their actions as they are both quite keen, but she teased that it would not be easy to keep Jimmy "at bay" and making it work.

Gregson explained that Steve is completely "doe-eyed" over Ronnie and that Steve believes that she cannot do anything wrong, and added that Steve is having the "best sex" that he has had in a long time. Gregson enjoyed the storyline as it featured "comedy" and light-hearted content in comparison to his previous emotional storylines, with Gregson commenting that he had to be taught how to smile again. Even though Ronnie tells Steve that keeping her in the business is dangerous, Steve does not take it seriously, with Gregson believing that Steve keeps pushing the issue of Jimmy "aside". Gregson believed that whilst Jimmy is not a "big man", he has a lot of people in his underworld who could be dangerous to Steve. Eileen Grimshaw (Sue Cleaver) advises Steve to tell his colleague Lloyd Mullaney (Craig Charles) about being Ronnie's boyfriend, but Steve decides to keep it a secret so that he can enjoy being with Ronnie and avoid Lloyd's reaction. Gregson opined that Steve was "too busy getting his oats to be bothered!" When Lloyd finds out, he "hits the roof" as he is worried about his safety and the safety of everyone at Streetcars as he has heard about Jimmy's reputation, but Steve "won't have any of it". Jimmy later comes and threatens Lloyd, but Steve does not take it seriously when he hears about it later as he believes that it will eventually "blow over". Stansfield has commented that she and Gregson have the same humour and that he would often make her laugh when they were filming.

=== Trouble with Jimmy ===
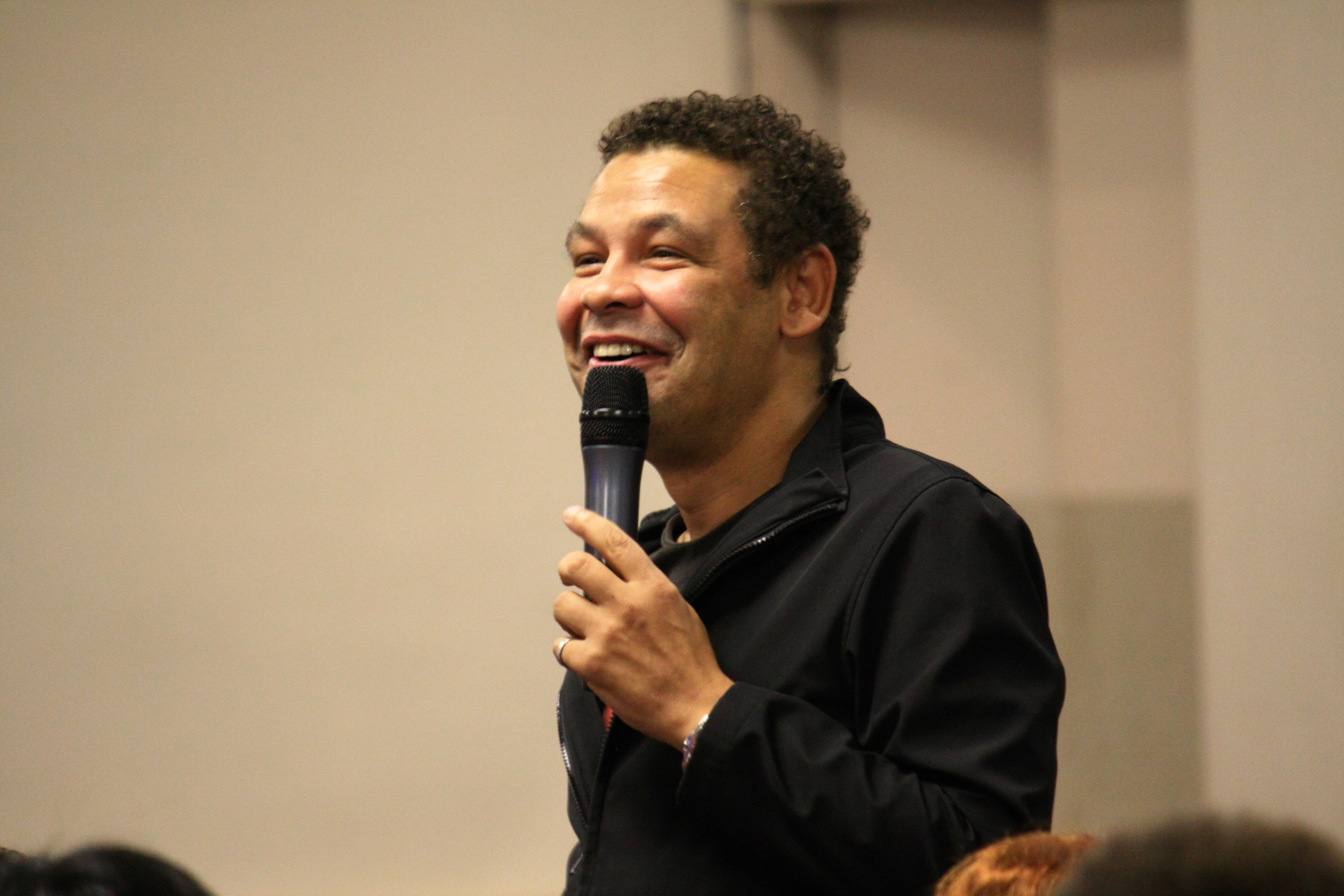
Craig Charles portrays Lloyd, who saves Ronnie and Steve.

Steve and Ronnie's fling ends in trouble when Jimmy takes revenge. It was reported that Jimmy would start a hate campaign against the taxi firm and that Steve would get kidnapped at gunpoint by gang boss Jimmy after confronting him in the Rovers. A Coronation Street insider teased, "This will be some of the most dramatic stuff for years and fans will be on the edge of their seats wondering how Steve will get out this sticky situation". In the storyline, Jimmy makes a hoax call to Streetcars and is able to lure Ronnie to an abandoned farm. He and his son Nick Clayton (Paul Simpson) then trap a petrified Ronnie by shooting the tires of her car and although she is able to radio Streetcars, this only drags Steve into the "tense showdown", who rushes to save Ronnie. Gregson explained that when Steve arrives, he crashes his car due to Jimmy shooting his tires and he then steps out of the car with Jimmy holding a shotgun to his face, which finally makes Steve realise how serious the situation is after being in denial until that point and that Jimmy is an insane "genuine hard man". Gregson explained that Jimmy is "unhinged" because he loves Ronnie. When Jimmy gets angrier and smashes Steve's windscreen, Ronnie takes desperate measures and tells Jimmy that she will go back to him, which buys the pair time and calms Jimmy, but he remains angry at Steve and loses it with him for having sex with Ronnie. Lloyd then arrives and distracts Jimmy, which leads to Steve getting hold of the shotgun and they make a "quick getaway" in Lloyd's car, which Gregson called "dramatic". Jimmy chases the three and unsuccessfully tries to run them off the road, which Gregson called a "terrifying ordeal". Gregson was unwell with a throat and chest infection when they were filming the car chase scenes and was taking medication to get rid of it, though he called filming the scenes "a laugh". The actor believed that this experience was a "shock" and a "wake-up call" for Steve and has finally made him realise what he is risking by being with Ronnie, but added that this was not enough to stop Steve being with Ronnie as he is "truly smitten" with her.

"There's so much for Ronnie to lose. She's only just got to the stage in her life where she's happy, and she's scared about throwing all that away. She's got a lovely boyfriend and now that her ex-husband is behind bars, she feels part of the Street. For the first time she's living in a safe place, and she's going to do everything she can to protect that."

— Stansfield on Ronnie (2006)

Ronnie becomes determined that her first Christmas with Steve will be "one to remember" after spending many years trapped in an unhappy marriage; however, it was teased by Inside Soap that her "over-generous" Christmas gift for Steve could make it memorable for the wrong reasons. Stansfield explained that Jimmy bullied and controlled Ronnie, but also spoilt her financially, and that Ronnie wants to do something special for Steve's Christmas as he makes her happy. Coronation Street producer Tony Wood had teased that it would be clear at Christmas that Ronnie is up to something. He revealed there would be a big present from Jimmy on the table on Christmas Day, showing that he can somehow still get to them from prison. Wood also revealed that it would become clear that there is more to Ronnie than "meets the eye" when she goes to visit Jimmy in prison. Having taken £5000 from Jimmy's secret fund, Steve cannot believe his eyes when he opens the money on Christmas Day and becomes speechless, and he then tells Ronnie that he cannot take the "tainted" money as he believes that it will put in danger of Jimmy. Ronnie initially believes that Steve is overreacting, but when then receives a "stunning necklace" and a visiting order from Jimmy, it becomes clear that her ex knows that he took the money. Stansfield explained that Ronnie is "unnerved" as the necklace is purple, which means bad luck in criminal circles and thus is a message from Jimmy, but she is determined to stand up to him and will not let him ruin her "new-found stability". At the prison, Ronnie tries to "put up a front" and give Jimmy what for, but he threatens her and Steve, with Stansfield revealing that Ronnie is scared despite trying to tell Jimmy that she will no longer put up with his bullying. Despite Jimmy's death threats, Ronnie tells Steve that they will spend the money on a holiday, which puzzles Steve but he accepts that she is telling the truth due to having "blind faith" in her. Stansfield believed that there was "no doubt" that Ronnie loves playing games and that Ronnie loves that two men "adore" her, though the actress hinted that Ronnie was "playing with fire" and that her overconfidence might come back to haunt her.

=== Framing Steve and departure ===
In April 2006, it was reported that Ronnie would face jail after running over an elderly man whilst sending a text message while driving after a fight with Steve. Meanwhile, Steve cheats on Ronnie with Kelly Crabtree (Tupele Dorgu). It had previously been reported that Steve would go back to his "womanising ways" after his relationship with Ronnie "sours". It was also hinted that the end of Steve's relationship with Ronnie could cause trouble for him due to Ronnie's dangerous connections. After hitting the pensioner, Ronnie checks on him and drives off, with the victim still motionless. She then gives Eileen a fake location to avoid being caught, and she later finds out via the news that the pensioner died. A writer from the Daily Mirror noted the similarities between the storyline and a real life case in 2001 when a lorry driver killed someone that he ran over when he was texting his girlfriend whilst driving.

Ronnie does her best to ensure that Steve is framed for the crime. When the Streetcar car that she used gets a speeding ticket, Ronnie asks Steve to say that he was driving the car by lying that she has too many points on her driver's license; Steve is not happy by this but agrees to "take the rap" for her as she has his wrapped around her finger. Gregson explained that Steve is also taking the blame as he feels guilty for having sex with Kelly and is hoping that this will ensure that Ronnie and Lloyd, Kelly's boyfriend, do not find out. When the police turn up, Steve is not worried as he has done nothing wrong, but he panics when he realises that they have evidence against him, and he begins to wonder whether Ronnie has set him up. Despite the police finding a dent in his car, Steve remains "desperate" to find an explanation that shows that Ronnie is not a "cold-hearted killer", with Gregson explaining that Steve does not want to believe that Ronnie would do such a "terrible thing". Steve quizzes Ronnie, who looks him in the eye and tells him and swears that the accident has nothing to do with her; Gregson opined that Ronnie is "too clever" and that Steve is "easily blinded" to the truth and hearing what he wants to hear. When Steve is arrested, Steve frames him further by telling the police that Steve tried to convince her to take the blame for the speeding and shows her clean license as proof, which Gregson believed revealed Ronnie as an "evil woman". Steve later is able to clear his name after confessing to having sex with Kelly on the night of the accident and Ronnie is eventually arrested for the crime.

The storyline led to Ronnie's departure from the soap. Ronnie's last episode aired on 11 June 2006. Ronnie's departure had previously been reported. Ronnie was one of the characters written off by new producer Steve Frost that did not have "any connection with other characters", which was described as a "cast cull". Stansfield was sad to leave, but she was "really pleased" with her exit storyline, saying, "It's a lovely thing to have such a great storyline to go out on. There's so many ways a character could leave, and to go out with a bang is great". Her departure from the soap was featured in the news, which Stansfield believed was a good thing as it showed people that she was available for work. Stansfield also praised her experience in the soap for helping her as an actress with her confidence and recording scenes so quickly, commenting, "The speed they work at is just unbelievable. You have to learn to get it right and know exactly what you're doing when you come in every day. There's never time to go back and do it again, and that experience has been invaluable, really".

== Storylines ==
Steve McDonald (Simon Gregson) interviews Ronnie for a driving job at his taxi firm Street Cars. Steve is smitten with her and offers her a job immediately and takes her out for a drink. Ronnie's former husband, gangster Jimmy Clayton (David Crellin), warns Steve's colleagues Lloyd Mullaney (Craig Charles) and Eileen Grimshaw (Sue Cleaver) that they must not employ Ronnie. Steve knows that he must fire Ronnie but they end up having sex instead. Ronnie threatens to have Lloyd beaten up if Ronnie is not fired, but Steve refuses to let her go. Jimmy begins making hoax calls to Street Cars, which sends drivers on false call-outs. After Jimmy sees Ronnie and Steve kissing, he threatens her into returning home to him but Ronnie makes it clear that their marriage is over, and Steve also tells him to leave her alone. Jimmy's son Nick Clayton (Paul Simpson) threatens Street Cars employee Claire Peacock (Julia Haworth) and a brick is thrown through Lloyd's windscreen. Jimmy then lures Ronnie to Wildclough Farm and Nick shoots the tyres on her cab. Steve arrives to save Ronnie but Nick also shoots his tyres and Jimmy tries to kill Steve, but Lloyd pushes Jimmy out of the way. Steve, Ronnie and Lloyd all escape, but Ronnie becomes distant from Steve after the ordeal and moves out of his house to live back in her own flat to assert her independence, though she assures Steve that they are not over.

Ronnie gives Steve £5000 of Jimmy's money as a Christmas present when he admits that he is having money trouble, but he angrily rejects it. Ronnie visits Jimmy in prison and tells him that she is keeping the money and threatens to expose his dodgy dealings if he protests. Months later, Steve and Ronnie have a row, which leads to Steve having sex with Kelly Crabtree (Tupele Dorgu). Whilst driving, Ronnie tries to phone Steve and leaves him a voice message telling him that she wants to try again. Not concentrating on the road, Ronnie runs over an elderly man and is unsure whether he is dead or alive. Checking that no one saw her, Ronnie drives off and tells Lloyd that she is at a different location. Steve and Ronnie makeup, but Ronnie is shaken when she finds out via the news that the man she ran over died. As Street Cars received a speeding fine from that night, Steve agrees to cover for Ronnie and say that he was driving, unaware of what happened. The police then tell Steve about the hit and run and Steve questions Ronnie about framing him but denies knowledge of the incident. Steve has to admit to the police that he was with Kelly the night of the accident in order to prove his innocence. Ronnie is then arrested and later sentenced to 25 years in prison.

== Reception ==
Stansfield commented that she received "really nice comments" from people in letters and on the street after she began appearing in the soap. Helen Crossley from Inside Soap wrote that Ronnie made the "most of her charms" during her interview with Steve. A writer from RTÉ.ie called Ronnie "sexy". Kate Woodward from Inside Soap called Ronnie "sexy" and noted that Steve had been "smitten" with her from the moment he saw her. She also opined that it was an issue that "blissfully unaware" Steve was having too much fun with Ronnie to fire her as it was putting him and his taxi firm in danger. Woodward also questioned whether Ronnie was worth the risk. Woodward's colleague Helen Crossley called the moment that Jimmy cornered Ronnie "horrifying". Gary Gillatt from the same magazine called Ronnie "unpredictable" and joked about how Ronnie was part of Steve's unsuccessful lovelife. Caroline Westbrook from Metro opined that Ronnie's "biggest storyline" was killing someone in a "shocking hit-and-run".

A writer from the Daily Mirror noted how Ronnie "callously" after hitting the elderly man with her car. Charlotte Richards from Inside Soap called Ronnie framing Steve "shocking" and called Ronnie "cunning" and "devious". from OK! called Ronnie one of Stansfield's "standout roles" and opined that Ronnie initially had a "idyllic and blossoming romance" with Steve and a "horrific ordeal" with Jimmy. Following Stansfield's appearance on the soap in 2021, James Rodger from Birmingham Mail reported how viewers were "speechless" as they recognised Stansfield from playing Ronnie. Charlotte Tutton from the Daily Mirror noted how viewers still recognised Stansfield from her role as Ronnie 15 years later. Jessica Sansome from Manchester Evening News also reported how viewers in recognised Stansfield as having played Ronnie and opined that that Ronnie was involved in a "dramatic storyline" at the taxi firm.
