= Fight or Flight (2007 film) =

- Directed by: Peter J McCarthy; Shane Sutton
- Produced by: Peter J McCarthy
- Release date: 2007
- Running time: 78 minutes
- Country: Ireland

Fight or Flight is a 2007 documentary film produced by Peter J McCarthy and directed by McCarthy and Shane Sutton. The film won "Best Foreign Documentary" at the Long Island Film Festival as well as "Best Documentary" at festivals in Hamburg, Toronto and California. The film took over five years to make and was first premiered at the DocNz International film festival in Auckland, New Zealand in October 2007. It is based on a man's journey into the heart of Thai boxing (Muay Thai boxing) in Thailand. The film was funded by the Irish Film Board. The production involved two years of travelling throughout Thailand's ring fighting scene. Fight or Flight was in production at the same time Ong-Bak: Muay Thai Warrior was released. Fight or Flight is being broadcast in 2010 on Halogen TV (USA), Viasat (Scandinavia & Eastern Europe) and Filmmaster (Italy).

== Description ==
Not for the faint hearted, Fight or Flight is a feature film based on an epic journey of one man's experience in Thailand’s notorious ring-fighting scene, an adventure which saw a production time of over five years. Two of which were spent travelling throughout Thailand’s most remote locations where we followed this man's plight and journey to understand the underlying cause of conflict within himself and mankind. Fight or Flight premiered at the DOCNZ International Documentary Film Festival, New Zealand in September 2007. Fight or Flight can be looked at as a psychological study, a martial arts film and an Odyssey of modern-day man.

== Awards ==
- Best Foreign Documentary: Long Island Film Festival 2009
- Best Documentary: Radar Hamburg International Film Festival 2008
- Best Documentary for Artistic Expression: Temecula Film Festival in California 2008
- Best Documentary "Making a Difference Award" : Commffest Toronto 2008
- Best Feature Films Showcase: Moving Image Film Festival 2008
- Nominated for MAMA Awards: MAMA Awards Ireland 2008
- Nominated for Best Documentary: BIFF Wisconsin 2008
- Nominated for Best Editing at the IFTA Awards - Shane Sutton 2009
- Winning: The Beloit International Film Festival Fund for Emerging Filmmakers 2009

== Production ==
Production took place in the following gyms: Lanna Muay Thai, Fairtex in Bangkok, world muay thai camp on Samui and KRS gym in Ubon Ratchatani. The subject of the documentary trained with Ole Baguio Laursen in Krs Gym prior to Ole setting up the Legacy Gym.

The producers ventured to Cannes Film Festival and also Mipcom where they met with distributors and broadcasters with the intention of getting a contract signed. It was then decided at a later stage to self distribute on the http://www.fightorflight.tv website.

== Press ==
The Irish Times wrote a feature article on the project in February 2009 giving extensive coverage to the project.
