= Emma Stansfield =

British actress (b.1978)

- Born: 16 December 1978 (age 47)
- Education: Royal Central School of Speech and Drama
- Occupation: Actress
- Television: Coronation street,Jamie Johnson,The Crown,The Salisbury Poisonings.

Emma Stansfield (born Emma Thompson in 1978) is an actor and filmmaker.

== Life ==
Stansfield was born Emma Thompson to Colin and Gill Thompson, who trained at the Central School of Speech and Drama in London, and run an amateur dramatics society in Monmouth, Wales. She was brought up in Much Birch, England, and wanted to act from the age of three. Aged 12, she took the lead role of Oliver Twist in Monmouth Comprehensive School's production of Oliver! At Hereford Sixth Form College she continued her acting career by taking on the role of Cherry Barnum in their production of "Barnum."

In the week after herself graduating from the Central School of Speech and Drama, she took the name Emma Stansfield under Equity rules (as actress Emma Thompson had already registered the name), and landed a role in the teenage play Sparkleshark. Stansfield had her first TV roles in the television series Holby City and The Royal, and then made her West End Theatre debut in Andrew Lloyd Webber's production of Daisy Pulls It Off.

Although having extensive theatre credits, Stansfield is most well known for her role of Veronica 'Ronnie' Clayton in the soap opera Coronation Street from 2005 until she left in 2006.

In 2007 she played prostitute Esther Davies in the BBC's adaptation of Fanny Hill, and in April 2008 she portrayed Elaine Yates, wife of Jess Yates and mother of Paula Yates, in the BBC "Curse of Comedy" series episode, Hughie Green, Most Sincerely.

In 2008 she starred as an English nurse called Louise in the Irish drama Whistleblower, documenting the exposure and disbarring of Michael Neary, screened in August. In 2010 she played Belinda in the BBC television pilot Reunited. She also guest starred in the fourth season of Showtime's show The Tudors as the Protestant martyr Anne Askew.

In 2011, she appeared in a small role in Series 5 of Skins. In 2013 she played Audrey Gulliver in Privates.

In 2020, Stansfield and Kate Dickie appeared in the music video for Sleaford Mods' previously unreleased song "Second".

== TV work ==
- Coronation Street (2005–2006) as Ronnie Clayton
- Fanny Hill (2007) as Esther Davies
- Hughie Green, Most Sincerely (2008) as Elaine Yates
- Tess of the D'Urbevilles (2008) as Mary
- Heartbeat (2008) as Kim
- The Bill (2009) as Rebecca Reed
- Midsomer Murders "Small Mercies" (2009) as Rebecca Rix
- Reunited (2010) as Belinda
- The Tudors (2010) as Anne Askew
- Accused (2010) as Michelle Fensom
- Skins (2011) as Pamela
- Best Laid Plans (2012) as Lisa
- Endeavour (2012) as Sharon Veelie
- Privates (2013) as Audrey Gulliver
- Father Brown (2014) as Violet Fernsley
- Jamie Johnson (2016–20) as Karen Johnson
- The Coroner (2016) as Ruby Hamilton, episode 2.9 "Pieces of Eight"
- EastEnders (2019) as Olivia
- The Salisbury Poisonings (2020) as Nurse Emma
- Doctors (2021) as Rosie Statham
- Emmerdale (2023) as Julie Sawyer
- True Love and Wormholes (2026) as Maggie
