= The Good Doctor (2011 film) =

- Directed by: Lance Daly
- Written by: John Enbom
- Produced by: Orlando Bloom; Dan Etheridge; Jonathan King
- Starring: Orlando Bloom; Riley Keough; Taraji P. Henson; Rob Morrow; Michael Peña
- Cinematography: Yaron Orbach
- Edited by: Emer Reynolds
- Music by: Brian Byrne
- Production company: Fastnet Films
- Distributed by: Magnolia Pictures
- Release dates: April 23, 2011 (Tribeca); August 31, 2012
- Running time: 91 minutes
- Country: United States
- Languages: English; Spanish
- Budget: $6 million
- Box office: $5,206

The Good Doctor is a 2011 American thriller film directed by Lance Daly, and starring Orlando Bloom as the eponymous "good doctor".

== Plot ==
British medical student Martin E. Blake transfers to a Southern California hospital to start his residency. Outwardly charming, Martin is in reality a narcissist who longs to wield power over others. This attitude quickly alienates him from the nurses, whom he perceives as not respecting him to the extent he deserves. After Martin fails to endear himself to his first few patients and ends up on thin ice with his superiors, 18-year-old Diane Nixon comes in suffering from a kidney infection, which Martin treats. Diane and her family hail Martin as a hero, inflating his self-esteem. As Diane's health begins to improve, Martin begins tampering with her medications and intentionally botching her treatment while maintaining the illusion that he is doing everything within his power to nurse her back to health. Ultimately, he goes too far and accidentally kills Diane when he falls asleep during the night while watching her, after she becomes in critical condition.

An orderly, Jimmy, discovers a diary in which Diane has recorded sexual fantasies about Martin. Recognizing that even the implication of an improper doctor-patient relationship could potentially damage Martin's career, Jimmy uses the diary to blackmail Martin into providing him with narcotics. When Jimmy reveals that he intends to never hand over the diary, Martin laces the drugs with potassium cyanide and kills Jimmy, then breaks into his locker and steals the diary.

During the course of the criminal investigation in Jimmy's death, Martin is questioned by a police detective who comes to visit him at his home. Martin panics during the questioning, eventually locking himself in the bathroom and attempting to flush the diary down the toilet. When the toilet clogs, Martin climbs out the window and goes to the ocean, where he contemplates suicide. Instead, he sneaks back into his apartment and puts the diary in the garbage. With no evidence to implicate Martin in Jimmy's death, the detective leaves.

An unspecified amount of time later, Martin returns to his duties at the hospital, assuring a young patient, "I'm getting better all the time."

== Cast ==
- Orlando Bloom as Dr. Martin E. Blake
- Riley Keough as Diane Nixon
- Taraji P. Henson as Nurse Theresa
- Rob Morrow as Dr. Waylans
- Michael Peña as Jimmy
- Troy Garity as Dan
- Molly Price as Mrs. Nixon
- Wade Williams as Mr. Nixon
- Sorel Carradine as Valerie Nixon
- Evan Peters as Donny Nixon
- Nathan Keyes as Rich
- David Clennon as Dr. Harbison
- J.K. Simmons as Detective Krauss
- Noël Thurman as Mandy Claypool

== Release ==
The Good Doctor premiered at the 2011 Tribeca Film Festival and was released on DVD and Blu-ray on December 18, 2012.

== Reception ==
Rotten Tomatoes reports that 66% of 29 surveyed critics gave the film a positive review; the average rating was 6.2/10. On Metacritic, the film has a 52/100 rating based on ten reviews, indicating "mixed or average reviews". Ronnie Scheib of Variety wrote, "Black comedy lurks just below the suspenseful surface, with more than a hint of Lolita-esque absurdity." Sura Wood of The Hollywood Reporter called it "a tense, psychosexual film" with a script that takes too few risks and does not explore Blake's origins satisfactorily.
