= A Film with Me in It =

A Film With Me in It
- Theatrical release poster
- Directed by: Ian Fitzgibbon
- Written by: Mark Doherty
- Produced by: Alan Moloney; Susan Mullen
- Starring: Dylan Moran; Mark Doherty; Amy Huberman; Keith Allen
- Cinematography: Seamus Deasy
- Edited by: Tony Cranstoun
- Music by: Denis Woods
- Production company: Parallel Films
- Distributed by: Element Pictures
- Release dates: 12 July 2008 (Galway Film Fleadh); 17 October 2008 (Ireland)
- Running time: 83 minutes
- Country: Ireland
- Language: English

A Film With Me in It is a 2008 Irish black comedy film directed by Ian Fitzgibbon and written by Mark Doherty. It follows Mark (Doherty), an unsuccessful actor and Pierce (Dylan Moran), a failing writer, who find themselves trying to cope after a string of accidents surrounds them in corpses. The film generally received a positive response, and was released on DVD in October 2011.

== Plot ==
Mark is an actor living in a basement flat below his writer friend Pierce. Residing with his girlfriend Sally, Mark struggles to find work whilst caring for his paralysed brother, David. Desperate to avoid paying overdue rent, Mark continually eludes landlord Jack, meaning he is also unable to inform Jack of the flat's dilapidated state.

Discovering that Mark wasted money meant for the overdue rent, Sally finally decides to end her strained relationship with Mark, informs Jack of the repairs needed, and arranges to move out. The damaged state of the flat reaching its peak, Mark witnesses two consecutive freak accidents; a bookshelf falls and kills his dog, and the living room chandelier collapses and crushes David. Reeling in horror from the events, Mark looks on as Jack appears to repair a high lightbulb atop a wobbly stool, only to fall and pierce his throat with his screwdriver. Pierce then arrives and discovers the corpses, causing him to panic.

Hiding in the bathroom, Mark and Pierce plot to control the situation, only for Sally to return. Discovering David's body, Sally faints and impales herself on Mark's clarinet stand, killing her too. Realizing the absurdity of four consecutive, fatal accidents occurring in one place, Pierce concocts a plan to move Jack's body to an alternative location, as they both had a strong motive to murder him. Shooing Sally's father when he arrives, a police officer then arrives due to an unrelated noise complaint, causing Pierce to panic and take her hostage.

Unable to kill the officer, the duo ties her up and attempts to reason with her. Left unattended, she attempts to escape through a faulty window, only for it to close and crush her head. Now surrounded by several corpses, Pierce finally formulates a plan; placing David, Sally, Jack, and the dog in his car, they drive it to a secluded area and cause it to explode, leaving minimal forensic evidence. Additionally, since three immediate deaths of Mark's acquaintances can place suspicion on him, Mark places his jewellery and clarinet on David's corpse, faking his own death.

Finally moving the officer to the neighbour's garden, Pierce fakes her death as caused by a falling plant pot. Cutting Mark's hair and dressing him as David, the two attempt to pass Mark as his disabled brother, and give Pierce an alibi as his carer in Mark's absence. In the closing scenes Mark's agent rings with an attractive role to offer Mark which, in his new persona as David, he cannot accept. And Pierce directs a film to a script he wrote based on the tragic events.

== Cast ==
- Mark Doherty as Mark, a struggling actor.
- Dylan Moran as Pierce, an aspiring screenwriter and Mark's best friend.
- Amy Huberman as Sally, Mark's long suffering girlfriend.
- Keith Allen as Jack the landlord. Allen previously played a tenant who died unexpectedly in the film Shallow Grave.
- Aisling O'Sullivan as a policewoman.
- David O'Doherty as David, Mark's brother who was paralysed following a rugby accident. David and Mark are brothers in real life despite the different stage surnames.
- Ronan Wilmot as Sally's father.

The film also features cameos from Irish director Neil Jordan and actor Jonathan Rhys Meyers.

== Production ==
The film was shot in the Dublin 4 area.

== Reception ==
Michael Dwyer of The Irish Times gave the film 4 stars out of 5 and described it as "Withnail & I reworked by Joe Orton".

It was nominated for six Irish Film and Television Awards including Best Film, Best Actor (Dylan Moran) and Best Screenplay (Mark Doherty), but did not win, with the film Hunger winning in six of eight categories in which it was nominated.

It won the Special Jury Prize at the 28th International Istanbul Film Festival in Turkey.
