= Lance Daly =

Irish film director, screenwriter and producer

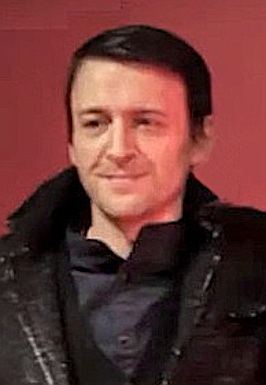
- Daly at ADIFF 2018
- Born: Dublin, Ireland
- Occupations: film director, screenwriter, film producer
- Years active: 2001–present
- Notable work: Kisses, Black '47

Lance Daly is an Irish film director, screenwriter and producer.

== Biography ==
Daly was born and raised in Dublin. He acted occasionally in his youth, including a role as a harmonica-playing extra in The Commitments (1991). He studied communications studies at Dublin City University.

Daly won an IFTA for his first major film, Kisses. According to Paul Whitington (Irish Independent), "Daly was one of a new generation of filmmakers who emerged in the mid-2000s determined to move beyond the stodgy, word-heavy traditions of Irish cinema. In films like Kisses (2008), he used visual lyricism and cinematic storytelling to great effect."

In 2013, together with Kirsten Sheridan and John Carney, he established The Factory, a multi-purpose space focusing on film production, in Dublin's docklands.

Black '47, a 2018 revenge film set during Ireland's Great Famine, was a commercial and critical success.

== Filmography ==
Year	Title	Director	Writer	Producer	Notes
2001	Last Days in Dublin	Yes	Yes	Yes	Directorial debut
2004	The Halo Effect	Yes	Yes	No	
2008	Kisses	Yes	Yes	Yes	Won IFTA for Best Director
2009	The Pagan Queen	No	Yes	No	Czech historical drama
2011	The Good Doctor	Yes	No	No	
2013	Life's a Breeze	Yes	Yes	Yes	
2018	Black '47	Yes	Yes	No	
2025	Trad	Yes	Yes	Yes	
