= Kisses (2008 film) =

2008 Irish drama film by Lance Daly

- Theatrical release poster
- Directed by: Lance Daly
- Written by: Lance Daly
- Produced by: Lance Daly; Macdara Kelleher; Peter Garde; Les Kelly
- Starring: Kelly O'Neill; Shane Curry
- Cinematography: Lance Daly
- Edited by: J. Patrick Duffner
- Production company: Fastnet Films
- Distributed by: Focus Features International; Element Pictures
- Release date: 21 November 2008
- Running time: 72 minutes
- Country: Ireland
- Language: English
- Box office: $30,738

Kisses is a 2008 Irish drama film directed by Lance Daly. The film is a coming of age drama about two ragamuffin preadolescents, next door neighbours from dysfunctional families living on the outskirts of Dublin, Ireland, who run away together one Christmas holiday.

== Plot ==
Dylan is kicked out of the house to go play by his father, Dylan talks to his neighbour, Kylie, about what a "prick" his father is, and his brother's decision to run away two years ago. Kylie tells him about the Sack Man, who kills kids, but Dylan says that it is just a story used by adults to control kids.

Kylie is sent to walk her infant sibling in a stroller. When she returns, there is a motorcycle parked in the driveway. She is cajoled by her mother to give her uncle a kiss. When he is leaving and comes to Kylie's bedroom to say goodbye, Kylie hides under her bed, where she has cash in a shoe.

Dylan's father screams at Dylan's mother and punches her, Dylan slams his handheld videogame into his father's face leaving leaves a plastic shard in his father's forehead. Dylan is chased by his father into an upstairs bathroom. Kylie comes to the rescue, manoeuvring a ladder near the window from Dylan's yard which allows him to escape his father. The pair run to a river, where a dredger is passing. They climb aboard over the protests of the captain, who gives them a ride to the end of the line, near Dublin and tells them about Bob Dylan—Dylan's namesake.

Kylie and Dylan want to find Dylan's brother, but all they know is that he was living in a squat on Gardiner Street. They start knocking on random doors and asking passers-by if they know him and a woman informs them that he was kicked out for fighting six months earlier. Dylan argues that they have to go home, but Kylie opposes this and runs off.

The two are reunited when Dylan observes Kylie running into an alley, pursued by a worker where she stole food from. She says that she never wants to go home. Kylie reveals that her uncle sexually assaulted her, forcing her to go along with it and gaining her terrified silence by telling her that no one would believe her. Together they find some boxes to sleep on, but a man drives by and tries to convince Kylie to ride with him. She refuses, and the car drives away, only for the man to return and kidnap her.

Dylan gives chase, grabbing the car's bumper and his Heelys allow him to roll along behind the car. As the men in the car try to get rid of him, Kylie breaks free of the car, and they both manage to lose their assailants. Kylie and Dylan share a passionate kiss, they find boxes to sleep on and spend the night on the street.

In the morning, Kylie awakens to a cold hand beside her. She stumbles away, wakes Dylan and they find a recently dead man. The two are returned to their homes by the police and their families are waiting for them. Kylie blows Dylan a kiss before their parents yank them away.

== Cast ==
- Kelly O'Neill as Kylie
- Shane Curry as Dylan
- Paul Roe as Dylan's father (Da)
- Neilí Conroy as Dylan's mother (Ma)
- Cathy Malone as Kylie's mother (Ma)
- Stephanie Kelly as Kylie's sister
- David Bendito as the Dredger captain
- Elizabeth Fuh as Gardiner Street tenant
- Stephen Rea as Bob Dylan tribute band singer

== Critical reception ==
On Rotten Tomatoes the film has an approval rating of 85% based on reviews from 53 critics. On Metacritic the film has a score of 68% based on reviews from 17 critics.

Rex Reed of The New York Observer called it a "poignant little film" and "a serendipitous journey worth taking". Stephen Holden of The New York Times opined that Kisses was a "small slice of Irish kitchen sink realism embellished with fairy-tale fantasy, "Kisses" may strike you as either ingeniously magical or insufferably cute, depending on your taste. But more than the story, which circles back on itself, the natural performances of its young stars, Shane Curry and especially Kelly O'Neill, nonprofessional actors, lend the movie a core of integrity."

Kevin Maher of The Times gave the film a mixed review and wrote that the film was "[u]ndeniably artful but wildly disingenuous... Like arthouse Roddy Doyle it's ambitious and phoney in equal measure."

== Accolades ==
Kisses was nominated for and won multiple awards from various film organizations and festivals. It took the Festival Prize for Best Feature Film at the Foyle Film Festival in 2008; won Best Irish Feature Film at the Galway Film Fleadh in 2008; the IFTA Award at the Irish Film and Television Awards for Best Director for Film and for Best Editing in 2009 and was also nominated there in categories for Best Actress in a Lead Role in a Film, Best Costume Design, Best Film, Best Hair & Make-Up and for Best Script for Film; and director Lance Daly received the Audience Award for the film at the Miami International Film Festival. Kisses was also an official selection at the Toronto International Film Festival, the Telluride Film Festival, the Locarno Film Festival and at the London Film Festival.

== Music ==
The music for Kisses was written and performed by Go Blimps Go.
