= Our Lady of Lourdes Hospital, Drogheda =

Our Lady of Lourdes Hospital
- Health Service Executive
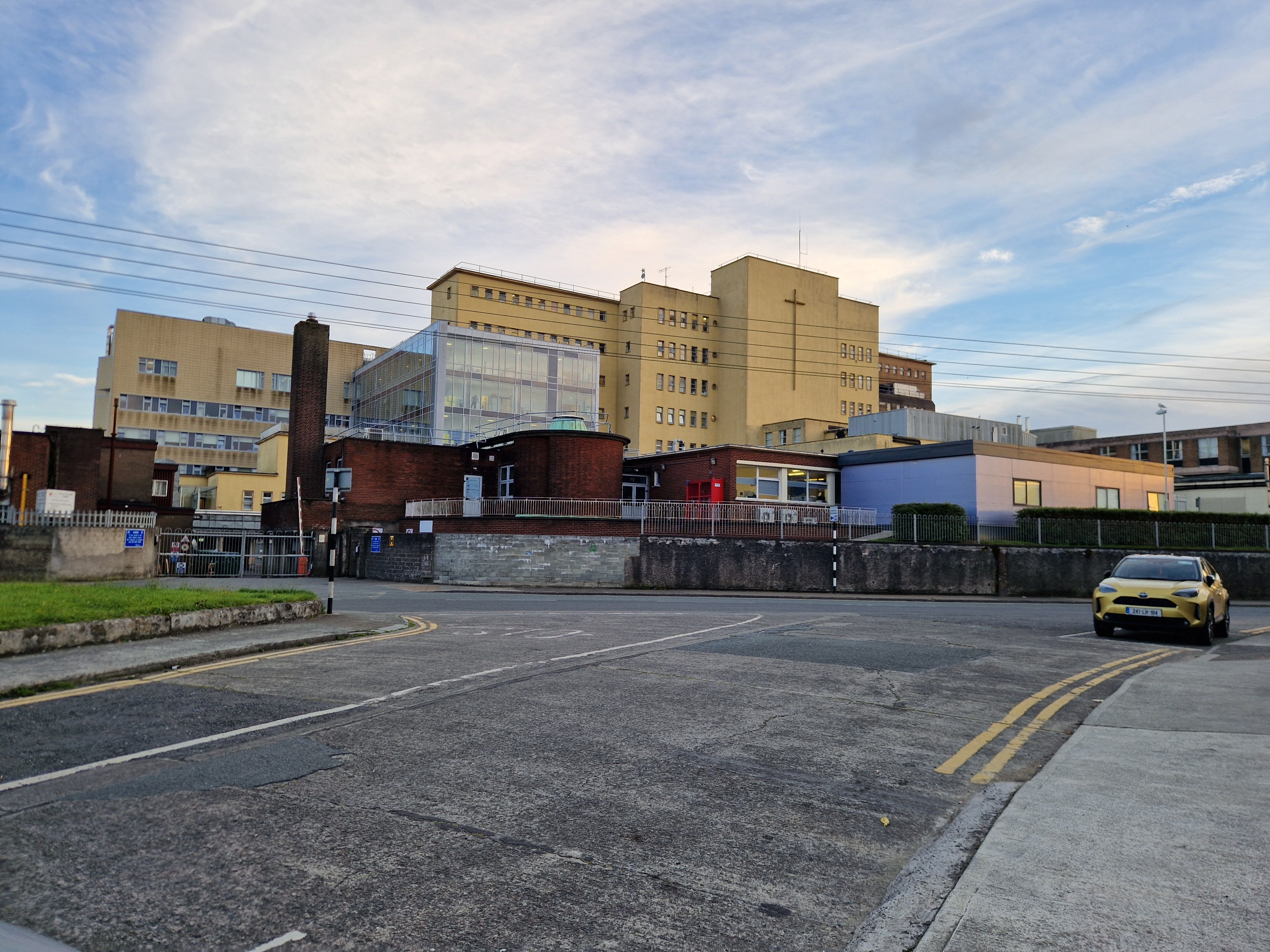
- Our Lady of Lourdes Hospital

- Shown in Ireland

Geography
- Location: Drogheda, County Louth, Ireland
- Coordinates: 53.7224°N 6.3540°W

Organisation
- Care system: HSE
- Type: Regional
- Affiliated university: Royal College of Surgeons in Ireland

Services
- Emergency department: Yes Accident & Emergency
- Beds: 340

History
- Founded: 1955

Links
- Website: www.hse.ie/eng/services/list/3/acutehospitals/hospitals/lourdes/
- Lists: Hospitals in the Republic of Ireland

Our Lady of Lourdes Hospital (Irish: Ospidéal Mhuire Lourdes) is a public hospital located in Drogheda, County Louth, Ireland. It is managed by RCSI Hospitals.

== History ==
The hospital, which was commissioned on the initiative of Mother Mary Martin of the Medical Missionaries of Mary, was opened as Our Lady of Lourdes International Missionary Training Hospital in 1955.

Obstetrician Michael Neary was found to have performed an excessive number of hysterectomies during Caesarean sections in hospital during the late 1970s.

The Catholic ethos of the Medical Missionaries of Mary has been blamed for some controversial practices in relation to abortion and contraception. In 1983, after Sheila Hodgers died of cancer days after giving birth, an article in The Irish Times alleged that anti-cancer medication and painkillers were withheld to protect her foetus. The hospital was the last in Ireland which performed symphysiotomy (widening of the pelvis during childbirth) and did not cease the practice until 1983.

The building was remodelled in the early 21st century. Stage 1 of the works, which involved a new extension, was carried out by P. J. Hegarty & Sons at a cost of €18 million and completed in 2010. Stage 2 of the works, which involved new accident and emergency facilities and new operating theatres, was carried out by a joint venture of GEM Construction and Elliott Construction at a cost of €40 million and completed in 2016.

== Services ==
The hospital provides 340 beds, of which 30 are reserved for acute day cases.
