= Michael Neary (surgeon) =

Irish surgeon

Michael Neary is a former Irish consultant obstetrician/gynaecologist who carried out unnecessary surgical removal of the wombs of 129 women, many immediately following delivery of a baby. This happened while he worked at Our Lady of Lourdes Hospital in Drogheda, County Louth. He was placed on administrative leave in 1998 and suspended by the Irish Medical Council in 1999 pending investigation. In 2003 he was found guilty of professional misconduct by the Irish Medical Council and struck off the Irish Register of Medical Practitioners.

The national scandal eventually led to state compensation for some of the victims. On 18 April 2007, Minister of Health Mary Harney announced a 45 million Euro compensation scheme, to cover up to 172 of the patients who had surgery between 1974 and 1998.

== Initial Enquiry ==
in 1998, three consultant obstetrician and gynaecologists from Dublin were asked by the Irish Hospital Consultants Association to review a number of cesarean hysterectomies carried out by Michael Neary. After examining nine case files presented by Dr Neary they found that he should continue working in the Lourdes Hospital, without sanction, pending any further inquiry. The three were subsequently named by the Irish Times as Professor Walter Prendiville and Dr Bernard Stewart of the Coombe Women's Hospital, and Dr John Murphy of the National Maternity Hospital in Holles St.

== Harding-Clarke inquiry ==
A judicial inquiry was set up in April 2004 by the then Minister for Health and Children, Micheál Martin to investigate the matter. The Lourdes Hospital Inquiry was led by Judge Maureen Harding-Clarke, a prominent Irish judge, and began hearing evidence and examining 30 years of medical records in June 2004. She and her team interviewed Neary himself, hospital staff in Drogheda and various action groups and patients.

After an almost two-year investigation, the 250-page report was completed in January 2006 and made public by the Tánaiste, and Minister for Health Mary Harney in February 2006. Harding-Clarke's report repeated many findings of the Medical Council's investigation (which she criticised for taking too long). The Inquiry found that Neary carried out 129 of 188 peripartum hysterectomies carried out in the hospital over a 25-year period, some on very young women of low parity. The average consultant obstetrician would carry out 5 or 6 of these operations in their entire career.

The report criticises the 'Catholic ethos' of the hospital at the time. Sterilisation was forbidden, contraception was unavailable, but 'secondary' sterilisations were commonly and sympathetically carried out on women who did not want more children but were forbidden to use contraception by the Church.

The report states that there was a "culture of respect and fear" in the unit so that even when questions were raised, people did not have the opportunity or the courage to speak out. The Inquiry came to the conclusion that Neary had a "heightened sense of danger" and that his fear of losing a patient approached "phobic dimensions" and led him to practice defensive medicine and carry out hysterectomies when he feared losing a patient. Judge Harding-Clarke wrote that questions should have been asked in the hospital long before 1998, when things first came to light. "The unplanned sterilisation of a young woman, as some of Dr. Neary's patients were, is too high a price to pay for a surgeon's phobias," states the inquiry report. One anaesthetist appointed to Lourdes in the 90s told the Inquiry that while people who worked with Neary come out and criticise him now, they "all thought he was wonderful" in 1996. Neary was seen as a hard-working consultant and was much respected in the area.

The Inquiry found how a senior consultant colleague of Mr. Neary's in the 70s and 80s, now deceased, told a Matron who was questioning the high number of hysterectomies that Neary was "afraid of haemorrhage". A junior consultant pathologist at the hospital in the early 80s asked his senior colleague why a perinatal uterus specimen he received seemed to have nothing wrong with it. The senior consultant replied "that's Michael Neary for you". Neary himself told the inquiry that he would have welcomed the opportunity to retrain and to observe other obstetricians at work. During the inquiry, he was asked about the frequent media claims that he hated women, and he replied that this was untrue, that "women were intuitive" and knew when men did not like them.

Judge Harding-Clarke notes in the report "It was difficult not to have some sympathy for Neary...his health is no longer strong. He is pilloried in the media and referred to as a 'monster' and a 'mutilator of women'. The effect on his life is profound. He will never practice medicine again, and he will never be given the opportunity to see how and where he got it wrong".

The Lourdes Hospital Inquiry Report uses the pseudonyms 'Ann' and 'Bridget' to refer to the two midwives who raised their concerns about Neary and notes on page 289 that "when the Health Board solicitor acted immediately on concerns expressed to him by two midwives on the 22nd day of October 1998, instead of general relief that finally these concerns had been aired, there was resentment towards the whistleblowers. We heard of comments to the effect that the whistle blowers would "never get a job in Ireland", that they would be sued for defamation and would generally come to a bad end. It would be difficult to say that there was general support for their criticisms of some of Dr. Neary's practices."

During the inquiry, Judge Harding-Clarke said that her offices were subject to three criminal forced entries. The judge also disclosed that 44 patient charts, 41 corresponding birth registers listing their babies' details, and a maternity theatre register, were stolen. Another theatre register was tampered with. Only the gynaecological register turned up - inexplicably - months after it was reported missing. They were "deliberately and unlawfully" removed, she wrote, "with a view to concealing the details of the operation performed and the treatment given. "Despite exhaustive research, judge Hardin-Clark never exposed the "miscreant/s" but she did suggest the involvement of women - at least two, one of whom wore nail varnish - and a possible motive of "misplaced loyalty" to Dr Neary. The bulk of the sabotage of patient files and medical records began in October 1998 when Dr Neary's alarming rate of hysterectomies first came to light. The Gardaí launched an investigation into the missing files and in August 2005, the Director of Public Prosecutions directed that no prosecutions would be made.

On 9 March 2006 Tom O'Malley, The Minister of State at the Department of Health and Children, launched the report in the Seanad and said 'I want to express my deepest regret and to apologise to these women and their families for what happened. I assure the women involved that many lessons will be learned from this report, and I equally assure them that the Government will respond fully to the report's findings.

== Aftermath ==
Michael Neary's actions caused national outrage. The idea that a well-known and liked (as he was at the time) consultant obstetrician could needlessly remove women's wombs, and get away with it for so long, was shocking in itself, but the delay in discovery and investigation, and numerous other incidents that emerged following the publication of the Lourdes Inquiry, created a media storm and resulted in pages of coverage in newspapers.The hospital's 25 year culture of silence was noted.

The women harmed by Neary came forward and spoke of their distress and how they still wonder why he did it. Represented by the group Patient Focus, some patients - though not all - received compensation for what happened to them at the Lourdes Hospital Drogheda. As a result of the outcry following the publication of the report, the Irish Medical Council pressed to introduce new legislation that would allow them more power to find and stop any doctor who is performing poorly. They also introduced stricter Competence Assurance rules for doctors.

The three Dublin obstetricians who wrote the two initial reports appearing to clear Neary of any wrongdoing and defending his treatment of nine women whose wombs he removed later expressed serious regrets. Dr John Murphy resigned in Feb 2007 as President of the Royal College of Physicians in Ireland following Medical Council criticism of his role in the case. All three were found guilty of professional misconduct by the Irish Medical Council in 2007 Subsequently, Professor Prendiville and Dr Murphy took a High Court case seeking to have the council's decision overturned. On 14 December 2007 the court found in favour of the two men and the Irish Medical council decided not to appeal the ruling.

Whistleblower was a two-part Irish television IFTA-winning fact-based drama, broadcast on RTÉ One for two consecutive nights in 2008. The story followed a young midwife who became concerned over the high number of caesarean hysterectomies carried out by consultant surgeon Dr. Neary at the Lourdes Hospital, Drogheda. Her blowing the whistle on Dr Neary sets in train a series of events which resulted in a full investigation which attracted high media coverage throughout the country. The true identity of the whistleblower remains shrouded in mystery, with Sheila O'Connor from Patient Focus collecting awards on their behalf.

In May 2008, the Director of Public Prosecutions (DPP) directed that there was insufficient evidence to bring a case against Neary, which angered the affected women. At the time, it was reported that Neary was living in his 500,000 Euro villa in the grounds of Isla Canela golf club in Southern Spain and that Neary had transferred ownership of his property in Spain as well as his five-bedroomed house in Monasterboice to his three children. The Irish Hospital Consultants Association were involved in his negotiations to retire on a full pension. Since then, he has returned to live in Ireland.
