= IFTA Award for Best Supporting Actor – TV Drama =

Irish television industry award

IFTA Award for Supporting Actor – Drama
- Awarded for: Best Performance by an Actor in a Supporting Role
- Country: Ireland
- Presented by: Irish Film & Television Academy (IFTA)
- First award: 2003
- Most recent winner: Chris Walley, The Young Offenders (2026)
- Website: ifta.ie

The IFTA Award for Supporting Actor – Drama is an award presented annually by the Irish Film & Television Academy (IFTA). It has been presented since the 3rd Irish Film & Television Awards ceremony in 2005 to an Irish actor who has delivered an outstanding performance in a supporting role in television. For the first and second ceremonies, supporting performances for film and television were combined into one category.

The record for most wins is three, held by Stephen Rea. The record for most nominations is nine, held by Liam Cunningham, who has won the award once. Chris Walley is the award's most recent winner, for The Young Offenders (2025).

== Eligibility ==
The award is exclusively open to Irish actors. The rules define an Irish person as follows:

- Born in Ireland (32 counties) or
- Have Irish Citizenship or
- Be full-time resident in Ireland (minimum of 3 years)

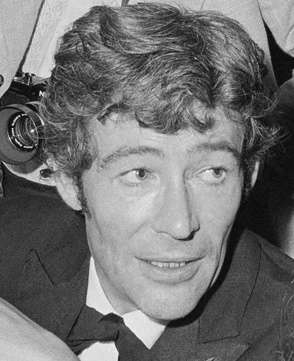
Peter O'Toole won for The Tudors.

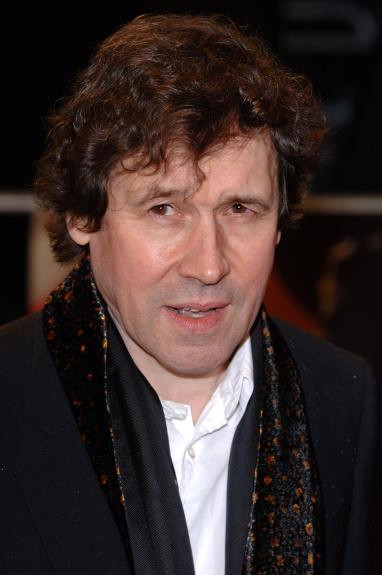
Stephen Rea won three times, for Father & Son (2009), Single-Handed and The Honourable Woman (2014).

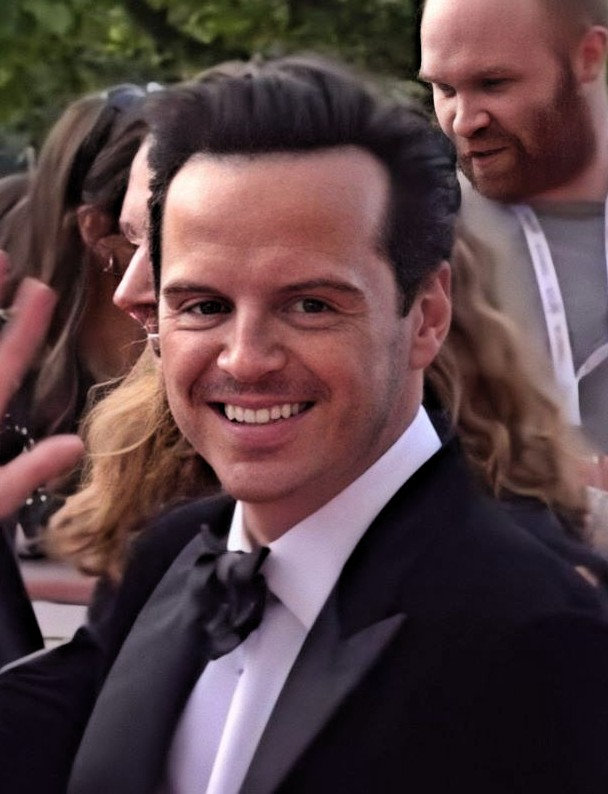
Andrew Scott won for Sherlock.

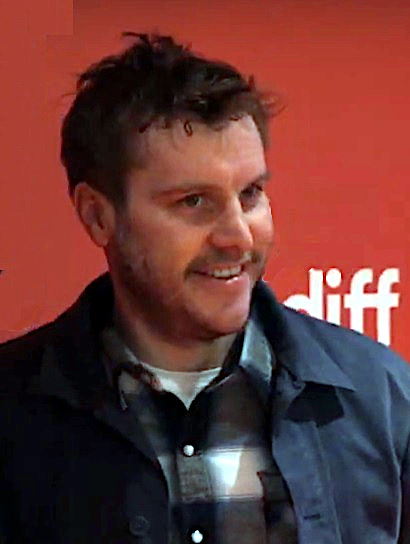
Peter Coonan won for Love/Hate.

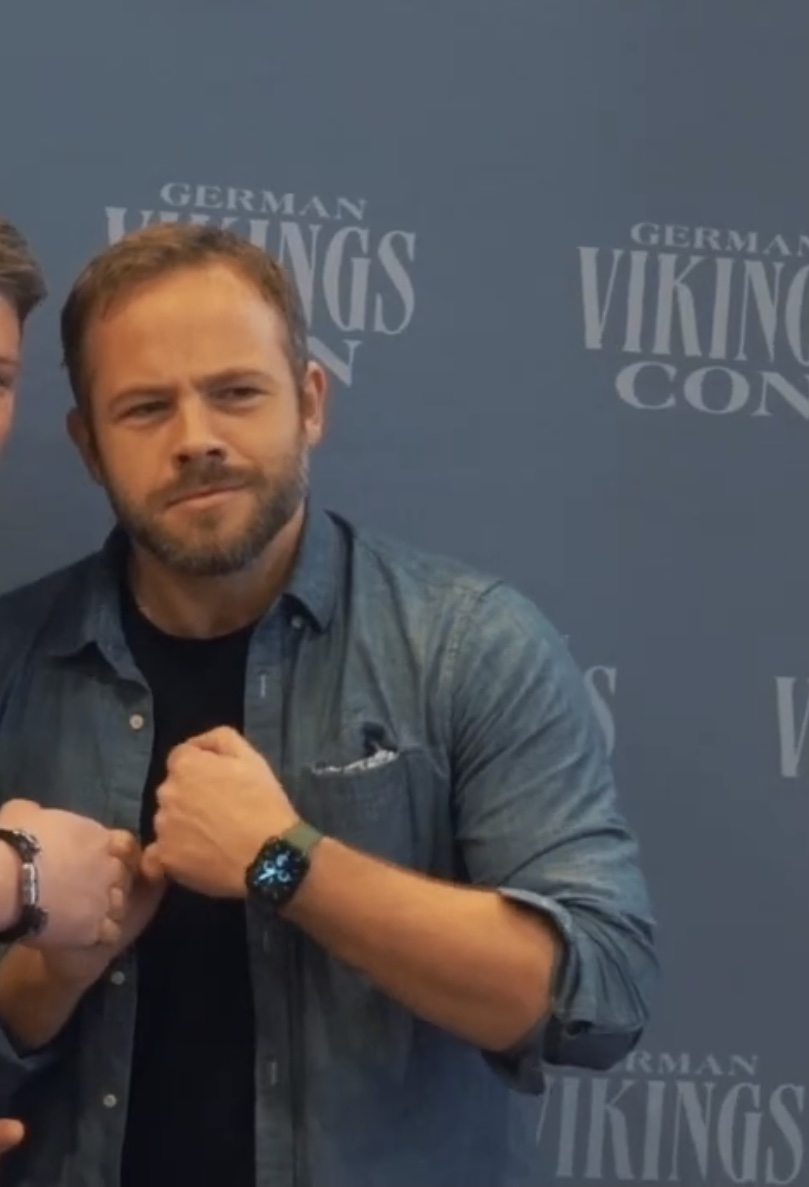
Moe Dunford won for Vikings.

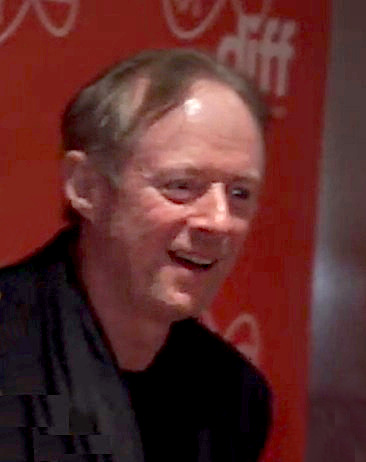
Ned Dennehy won for An Klondike.

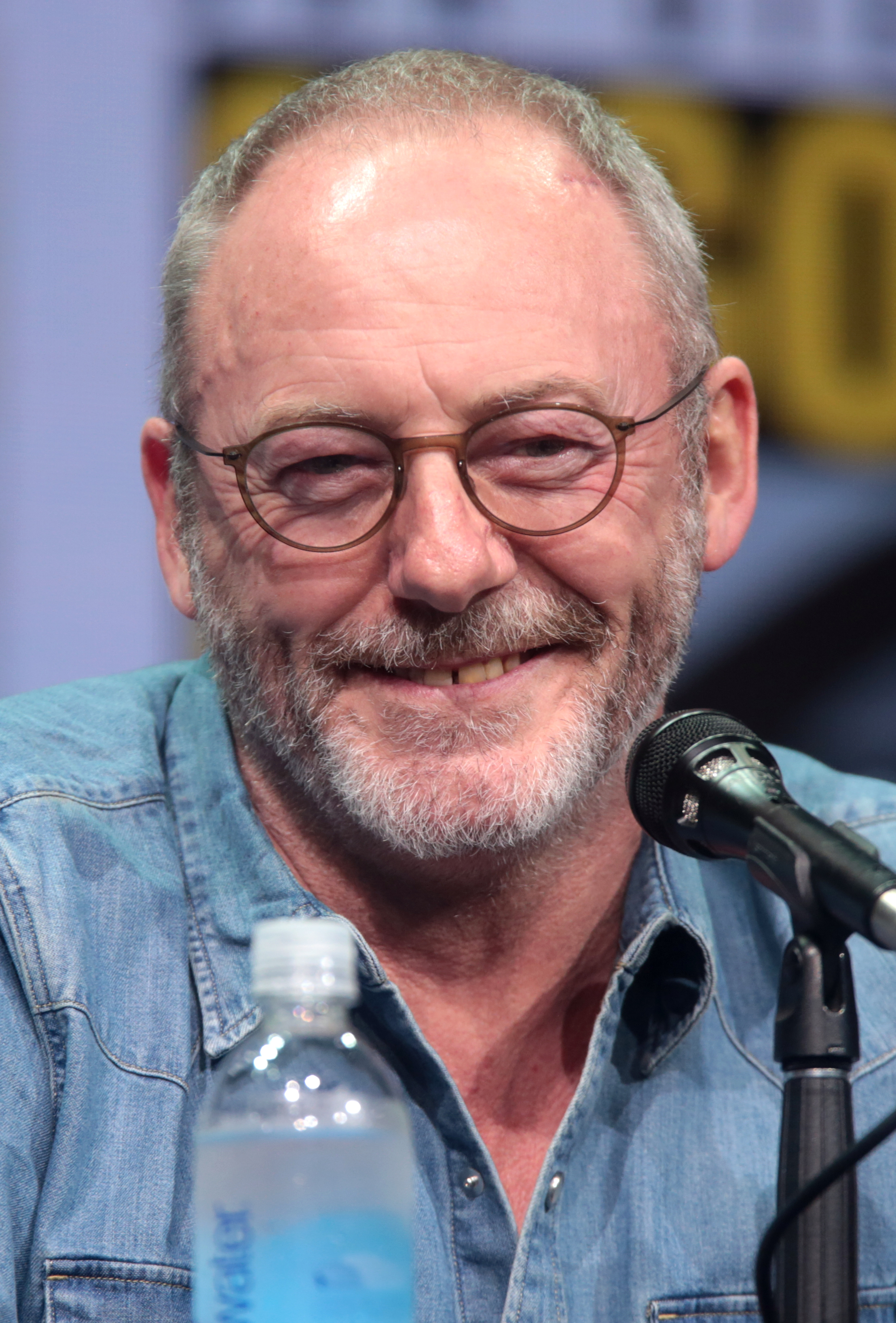
Liam Cunningham won for Game of Thrones.

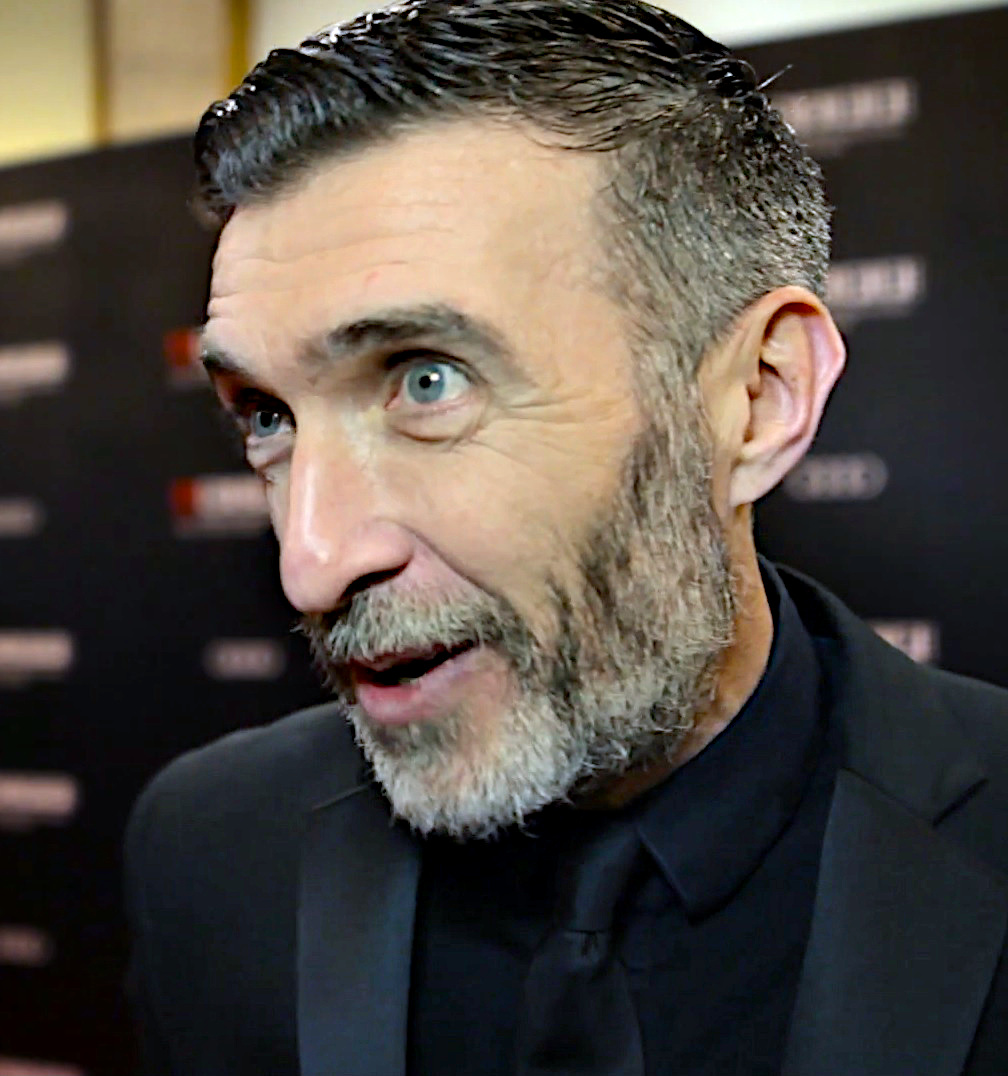
Mark O'Halloran won for The Virtues (2019).

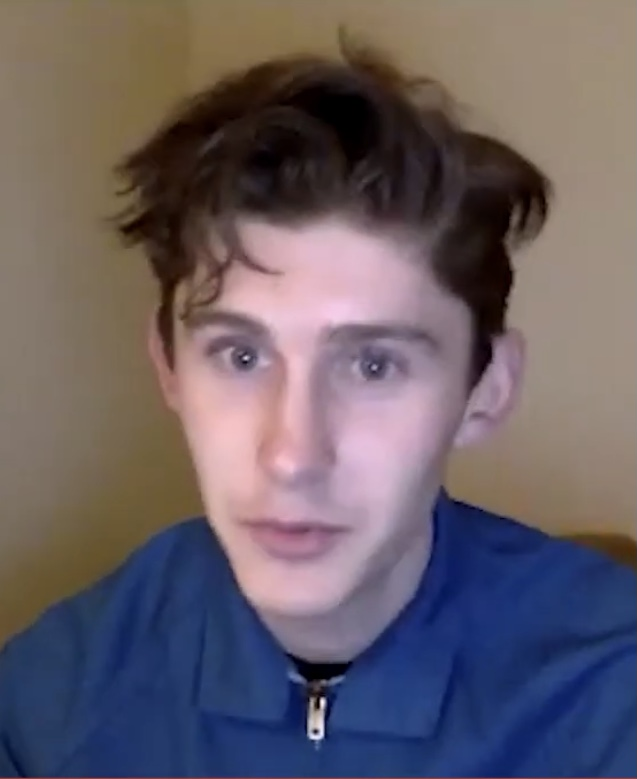
Fionn O'Shea won for Normal People (2020).

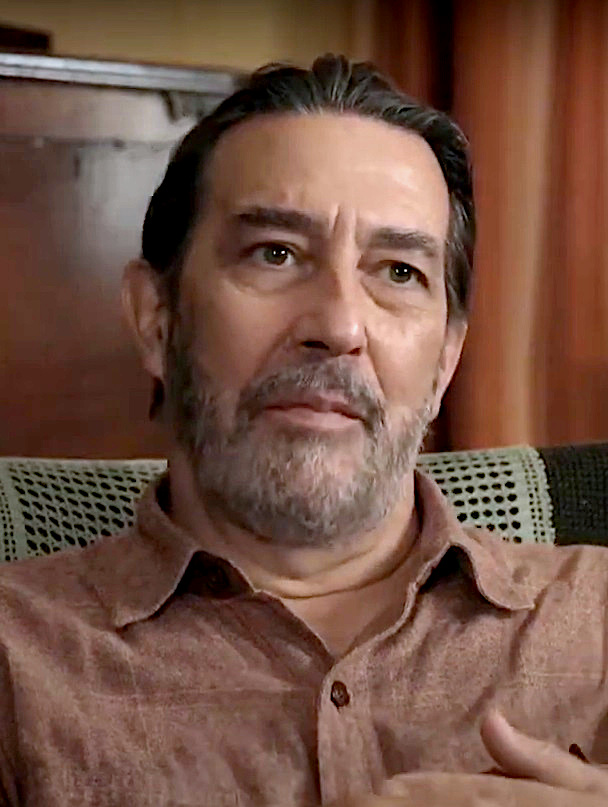
Ciarán Hinds won twice, for Kin and The Dry.

== Winners and nominees ==
In the following table, the years are listed as the year of television. The first three ceremonies were held at the end of the year, but since the 4th Irish Film & Television Awards the ceremonies have generally been held the following year. As there was no ceremony in 2019, the 16th Irish Film & Television Awards covered a period of two years.

Table key
‡	Indicates the winner

=== 2000s ===
Year	Actor	Programme	Ref.
2003 (Note: For the first two ceremonies, supporting performances for film and television were combined into one category. Only nominees from television are included in this list.) (1st)	Owen Roe	Murphy's Law	
2004 (2nd)	Colum Convey	Holy Cross	
2004 (2nd)	Gary Lydon	The Clinic	
2004 (2nd)	Jim Norton	Proof	
2005 (3rd)	Garrett Lombard ‡	Pure Mule	
2005 (3rd)	Gary Lydon	The Clinic	
2005 (3rd)	John Lynch	The Baby War	
2005 (3rd)	Chris O'Dowd	The Clinic	
2006 (4th)	Gary Lydon ‡	The Clinic	
2006 (4th)	Liam Cunningham	Murphy's Law	
2006 (4th)	Allen Leech	Legend	
2006 (4th)	Chris O'Dowd	Showbands	
2007 (5th)	Nick Dunning ‡	The Tudors	
2007 (5th)	Denis Conway	Prosperity	
2007 (5th)	Eamonn Hunt	The Running Mate	
2007 (5th)	Gary Lydon	The Clinic	
2008 (6th)	Peter O'Toole ‡	The Tudors	
2008 (6th)	Michael Fassbender	The Devil's Whore	
2008 (6th)	David Herlihy	The Clinic	
2008 (6th)	John Kavanagh	George Gently	
2009 (7th)	Stephen Rea ‡	Father & Son	
2009 (7th)	Declan Conlon	Fair City	
2009 (7th)	Diarmuid Noyes	Pure Mule: The Last Weekend	
2009 (7th)	Owen Roe	Val Falvey, TD	

=== 2010s ===
Year	Actor	Programme	Ref.
2010 (8th)	Stephen Rea ‡	Single-Handed	
2010 (8th)	Brian Gleeson	Love/Hate	
2010 (8th)	Seán McGinley	Wild Decembers	
2010 (8th)	Eamon Morrissey	Fair City	
2011 (9th)	Tom Vaughan-Lawlor ‡	Love/Hate	
2011 (9th)	Brendan Coyle	Downton Abbey	
2011 (9th)	Aidan Gillen	Game of Thrones	
2011 (9th)	Robert Sheehan	Misfits	
2012 (10th)	Andrew Scott ‡	Sherlock	
2012 (10th)	Peter Coonan	Love/Hate	
2012 (10th)	Allen Leech	Downton Abbey	
2012 (10th)	Chris O'Dowd	Moone Boy	
2013 (11th)	Peter Coonan ‡	Love/Hate	
2013 (11th)	Liam Cunningham	Game of Thrones	
2013 (11th)	Aidan Gillen	Game of Thrones	
2013 (11th)	Allen Leech	Downton Abbey	
2014 (12th)	Stephen Rea ‡	The Honourable Woman	
2014 (12th)	John Connors	Love/Hate	
2014 (12th)	Liam Cunningham	Game of Thrones	
2014 (12th)	Andrew Scott	Sherlock	
2015 (13th)	Moe Dunford ‡	Vikings	
2015 (13th)	Liam Cunningham	Game of Thrones	
2015 (13th)	Ned Dennehy	Dickensian	
2015 (13th)	Robert O'Mahoney	An Klondike	
2015 (13th)	Stephen Rea	War & Peace	
2016 (14th)	Ned Dennehy ‡	An Klondike	
2016 (14th)	Liam Cunningham	Game of Thrones	
2016 (14th)	Moe Dunford	Vikings	
2016 (14th)	Andrew Scott	The Hollow Crown	
2016 (14th)	Robert Sheehan	Fortitude	
2017 (15th)	Liam Cunningham ‡	Game of Thrones	
2017 (15th)	Moe Dunford	Vikings	
2017 (15th)	Aidan Gillen	Game of Thrones	
2017 (15th)	Owen McDonnell	Paula	
2017 (15th)	Jason O'Mara	Marvel's Agents of S.H.I.E.L.D.	
2018/19 (16th)	Mark O'Halloran ‡	The Virtues	
2018/19 (16th)	Liam Cunningham	Game of Thrones	
2018/19 (16th)	Barry Keoghan	Chernobyl	
2018/19 (16th)	Owen McDonnell	Killing Eve	
2018/19 (16th)	Cillian Ó Gairbhí	Blood	
2018/19 (16th)	Tom Vaughan-Lawlor	Dublin Murders	

=== 2020s ===
Year	Actor	Programme	Ref.
2020/21 (17th)	Fionn O'Shea ‡	Normal People	
2020/21 (17th)	Desmond Eastwood	Normal People	
2020/21 (17th)	Éanna Hardwicke	Smother	
2020/21 (17th)	Colm Meaney	Gangs of London	
2020/21 (17th)	Andrew Scott	His Dark Materials	
2021/22 (18th)	Ciarán Hinds ‡	Kin	
2021/22 (18th)	Liam Cunningham	Domina	
2021/22 (18th)	Aidan Gillen	Kin	
2021/22 (18th)	James Nesbitt	Stay Close	
2022/23 (19th)	Ciarán Hinds ‡	The Dry	
2022/23 (19th)	Moe Dunford	The Dry	
2022/23 (19th)	Brian Gleeson	Bad Sisters	
2022/23 (19th)	Daryl McCormack	Bad Sisters	
2022/23 (19th)	Michael Smiley	Bad Sisters	
2022/23 (19th)	Tommy Tiernan	Conversations with Friends	
2023 (20th)	Richard Dormer ‡	Blue Lights	
2023 (20th)	Simon Delaney	The Woman in the Wall	
2023 (20th)	Aidan Gillen	Kin	
2023 (20th)	Jared Harris	Foundation	
2023 (20th)	Aaron Monaghan	Hidden Assets	
2023 (20th)	Emmett J. Scanlan	Kin	
2024 (21st)	Tom Vaughan-Lawlor ‡	Say Nothing	
2024 (21st)	Anthony Boyle	Masters of the Air	
2024 (21st)	Liam Cunningham	3 Body Problem	
2024 (21st)	Michael Smiley	Bad Sisters	
2024 (21st)	Chris Walley	Bodkin	
2024 (21st)	David Wilmot	Bodkin	
2025 (22d)	Chris Walley ‡	The Young Offenders	
2025 (22d)	Jack Gleeson	House of Guinness	
2025 (22d)	Cal O'Driscoll	Video Nasty	
2025 (22d)	Dónall Ó Héalai	Hidden Assets	
2025 (22d)	Fionn O'Shea	House of Guinness	
2025 (22d)	Aidan Quinn	The Walsh Sisters	

== Multiple awards and nominations ==
The following individuals have received two or more Supporting Actor awards:

Wins	Actor	Nominations
3	Stephen Rea	4
2	Tom Vaughan-Lawlor	3
2	Ciarán Hinds	2

The following individuals have received two or more Supporting Actor nominations:

Nominations	Actor
9	Liam Cunningham
5	Aidan Gillen
4	Moe Dunford
4	Stephen Rea
4	Gary Lydon
4	Andrew Scott
3	Allen Leech
3	Chris O'Dowd
3	Tom Vaughan-Lawlor
2	Peter Coonan
2	Ned Dennehy
2	Brian Gleeson
2	Ciarán Hinds
2	Owen McDonnell
2	Fionn O'Shea
2	Owen Roe
2	Robert Sheehan
2	Michael Smiley
2	Chris Walley
