= IFTA Award for Best International Actress =

Irish film industry award

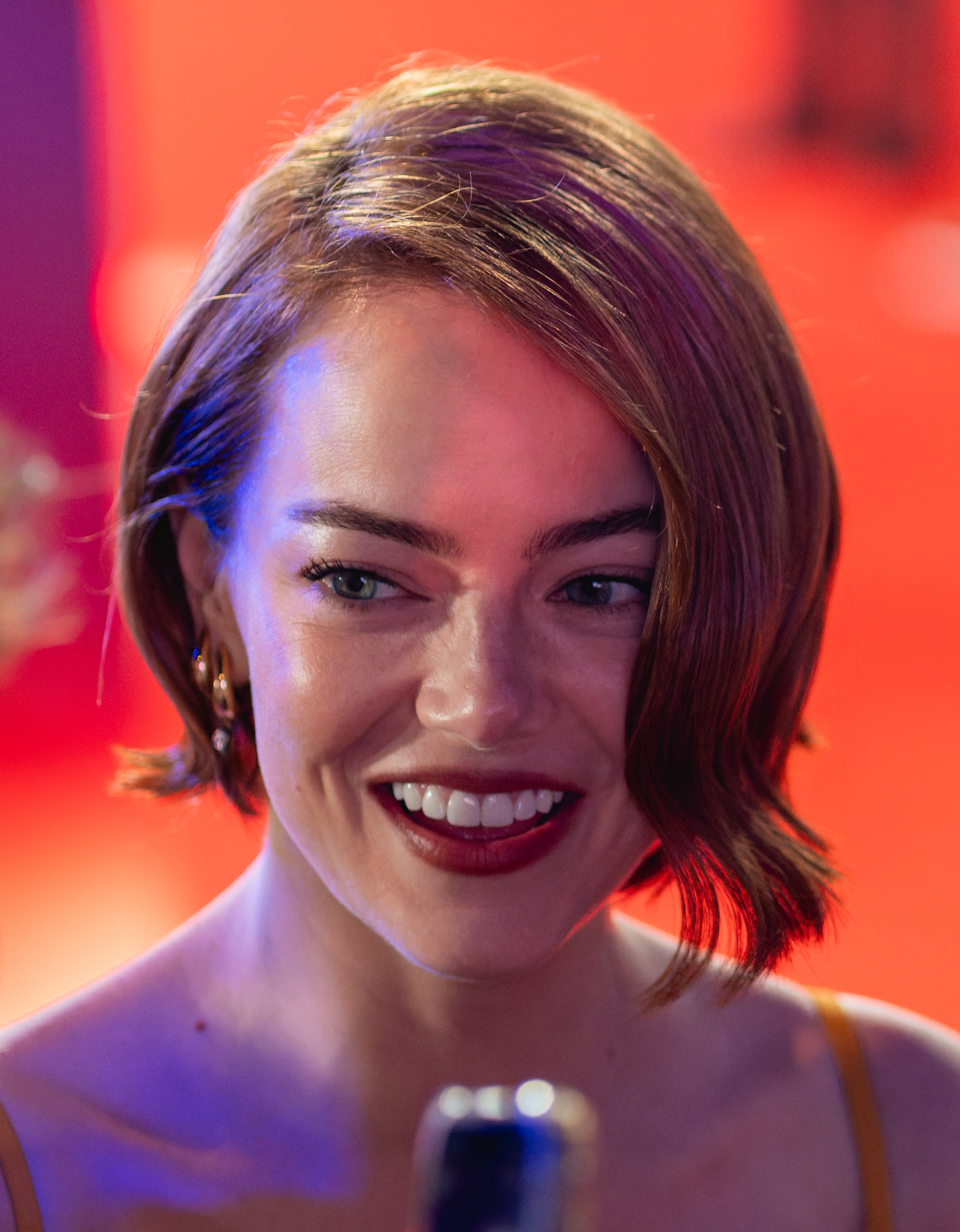
- The 2025 recipient: Emma Stone
- Awarded for: Best Performance by an Actress
- Country: Ireland
- Presented by: Irish Film & Television Academy (IFTA)
- First award: 2004
- Most recent winner: Emma Stone, Bugonia (2026)
- Website: ifta.ie

The IFTA Award for Best International Actress is an award presented annually by the Irish Film & Television Academy (IFTA). It was first presented at the 2nd Irish Film & Television Awards ceremony in 2004 to a non-Irish actress who has delivered an outstanding performance in a feature film.

The record for most wins is three, held by Emma Stone. The record for most nominations is four, held by Cate Blanchett. Stone is the award's most recent winner, for Bugonia (2025).

== Winners and nominees ==
In the following table, the years are listed as the year of film. The first three ceremonies were held at the end of the year, but since the 4th Irish Film & Television Awards the ceremonies have generally been held the following year. The award wasn't presented between the 16th and the 18th ceremonies, returning at the 19th ceremony in 2023.

Table key
‡	Indicates the winner

=== 2000s ===
Year	Actor	Film	Ref.
2004 (2nd)	Keira Knightley ‡	King Arthur	
2004 (2nd)	Keira Knightley ‡	Pirates of the Caribbean: The Curse of the Black Pearl	
2004 (2nd)	Cameron Diaz	Shrek 2	
2004 (2nd)	Scarlett Johansson	Lost in Translation	
2004 (2nd)	Charlize Theron	Monster	
2004 (2nd)	Uma Thurman	Kill Bill: Volume 2	
2005 (3rd)	Gillian Anderson ‡	The Mighty Celt	
2005 (3rd)	Drew Barrymore	The Perfect Catch	
2005 (3rd)	Dakota Fanning	War of the Worlds	
2005 (3rd)	Natalie Portman	Garden State	
2006 (4th)	Helen Mirren ‡	The Queen	
2006 (4th)	Penélope Cruz	Volver	
2006 (4th)	Eva Green	Casino Royale	
2006 (4th)	Kate Winslet	The Holiday	
2007 (5th)	Hilary Swank ‡	P.S. I Love You	
2007 (5th)	Cate Blanchett	Elizabeth: The Golden Age	
2007 (5th)	Jodie Foster	The Brave One	
2007 (5th)	Keira Knightley	Atonement	
2008 (6th)	Meryl Streep ‡	Mamma Mia!	
2008 (6th)	Angelina Jolie	Changeling	
2008 (6th)	Kristin Scott Thomas	I've Loved You So Long	
2008 (6th)	Emma Thompson	Brideshead Revisited	
2009 (7th)	Meryl Streep ‡	It's Complicated	
2009 (7th)	Marion Cotillard	Nine	
2009 (7th)	Penélope Cruz	Broken Embraces	
2009 (7th)	Anna Kendrick	Up in the Air	

=== 2010s ===
Year	Actor	Film	Ref.
2010 (8th)	Annette Bening ‡	The Kids Are All Right	
2010 (8th)	Helena Bonham Carter	The King's Speech	
2010 (8th)	Jennifer Lawrence	Winter's Bone	
2010 (8th)	Nataša Petrović	As If I Am Not There	
2011 (9th)	Glenn Close ‡	Albert Nobbs	
2011 (9th)	Meryl Streep	The Iron Lady	
2011 (9th)	Tilda Swinton	We Need to Talk About Kevin	
2011 (9th)	Kristen Wiig	Bridesmaids	
2012 (10th)	Marion Cotillard ‡	Rust and Bone	
2012 (10th)	Jennifer Lawrence	Silver Linings Playbook	
2012 (10th)	Andrea Riseborough	Shadow Dancer	
2012 (10th)	Emmanuelle Riva	Amour	
2013 (11th)	Judi Dench ‡	Philomena	
2013 (11th)	Amy Adams	American Hustle	
2013 (11th)	Cate Blanchett	Blue Jasmine	
2013 (11th)	Sandra Bullock	Gravity	
2014 (12th)	Julianne Moore ‡	Still Alice	
2014 (12th)	Patricia Arquette	Boyhood	
2014 (12th)	Jessica Chastain	Miss Julie	
2014 (12th)	Toni Collette	Glassland	
2015 (13th)	Brie Larson ‡	Room	
2015 (13th)	Cate Blanchett	Carol	
2015 (13th)	Rachel Griffiths	Mammal	
2015 (13th)	Charlotte Rampling	45 Years	
2016 (14th)	Emma Stone ‡	La La Land	
2016 (14th)	Amy Adams	Arrival	
2016 (14th)	Viola Davis	Fences	
2016 (14th)	Natalie Portman	Jackie	
2017 (15th)	Frances McDormand ‡	Three Billboards Outside Ebbing, Missouri	
2017 (15th)	Sally Hawkins	Maudie	
2017 (15th)	Sally Hawkins	The Shape of Water	
2017 (15th)	Nicole Kidman	The Killing of a Sacred Deer	

=== 2020s ===
Year	Actor	Film	Ref.
2022/23 (19th)	Cate Blanchett ‡	Tár	
2022/23 (19th)	Viola Davis	The Woman King	
2022/23 (19th)	Florence Pugh	The Wonder	
2022/23 (19th)	Emily Watson	God's Creatures	
2022/23 (19th)	Michelle Williams	The Fabelmans	
2022/23 (19th)	Letitia Wright	Aisha	
2023 (20th)	Emma Stone ‡	Poor Things	
2023 (20th)	Annette Bening	Nyad	
2023 (20th)	Lily Gladstone	Killers of the Flower Moon	
2023 (20th)	Greta Lee	Past Lives	
2023 (20th)	Carey Mulligan	Maestro	
2023 (20th)	Margot Robbie	Barbie	
2024 (21st)	Demi Moore ‡	The Substance	
2024 (21st)	Cynthia Erivo	Wicked	
2024 (21st)	Angelina Jolie	Maria	
2024 (21st)	Mikey Madison	Anora	
2024 (21st)	Florence Pugh	We Live in Time	
2024 (21st)	Emily Watson	Small Things Like These	
2025 (22nd)	Emma Stone ‡	Bugonia	
2025 (22nd)	Chase Infiniti	One Battle After Another	
2025 (22nd)	Jennifer Lawrence	Die My Love	
2025 (22nd)	Margaret Qualley	Blue Moon	
2025 (22nd)	Renate Reinsve	Sentimental Value	
2025 (22nd)	Teyana Taylor	One Battle After Another	

== Multiple awards and nominations ==
The following individuals have received two or more Best International Actress awards:

Wins	Actor	Nominations
3	Emma Stone	3
2	Meryl Streep	3

The following individuals have received two or more Best International Actress nominations:

Nominations	Actor
4	Cate Blanchett
3	Jennifer Lawrence
3	Emma Stone
3	Meryl Streep
2	Amy Adams
2	Annette Bening
2	Marion Cotillard
2	Penélope Cruz
2	Viola Davis
2	Sally Hawkins
2	Angelina Jolie
2	Keira Knightley
2	Natalie Portman
2	Florence Pugh
2	Emily Watson

== See also ==
- Academy Award for Best Actress
- BAFTA Award for Best Actress in a Leading Role
- Critics' Choice Movie Award for Best Actress
