= Laurence Kinlan =

Irish film and television actor (born 1983)

- Born: 3 February 1983 (age 42); Dublin, Ireland
- Occupations: Film, television and stage actor
- Years active: 1998–present

Laurence Kinlan (born 3 February 1983) is an Irish actor in films, television series and on theatre stage. He is best known for playing the role of Elmo in RTÉ's crime drama Love/Hate.

== Career ==
=== Film and television ===
Kinlan's debut was a lead role, his film debut at age 14 as David in Soft Sand, Blue Sea directed by Pip Broughton. It tells the story of kids living in a children's home. They are not orphans, but are children of disinterested parents and, as such, carry the scars of being unloved and rejected. He got the role in an open audition at the Belvedere club and despite having no previous acting experience he got the part.

His biggest role was as Elmo Creed in the long-running Irish TV series Love/Hate, a gritty crime drama based on Dublin's criminal underworld written by Stuart Carolan and directed by David Caffrey. The cult series that is broadcast on RTÉ but followed worldwide stars actor Tom Vaughan-Lawlor (as Nidge Delaney) and co-stars Peter Coonan (as Fran Cooney), Laurence Kinlan (as Elmo Creed), Aidan Gillen (as John Boy Power) and Robert Sheehan (as Darren Treacy). Kinlan's character Elmo has become so popular the Irish FM104 launched a song titled "Elmo's A Headcase!" sampling portions of Kinlan's voice and sampling of "Sexy and I Know It" as "Elmo and I Know It".

Another major screen role for Kinlan was his portrayal of Dan Kelly in the 2003 Gregor Jordan film Ned Kelly, with the title character of the Kelly Gang played by Heath Ledger. Other roles were in this film directed by included Orlando Bloom, Geoffrey Rush and Naomi Watts.

Kinlan has appeared in various roles in a number of films and TV series, including notably Veronica Guerin, The Halo Effect, Intermission, Boy Eats Girl, The Guard and many others. He played the Irish independent politician Tony Gregory in the biopic of ex-Taoiseach (Prime Minister of Ireland) Charles Haughey titled Charlie which aired in 2015 on RTÉ.

=== Theatre ===
He also landed roles on stage, particularly on the stages of Abbey Theatre and Peacock Theatre, Dublin as well as appearing in tours elsewhere on stages in London, New York etc. His theatre appearances include the role of Leonard in On Such As We, directed by Wilson Milam, in A Month in the Country, directed by Jason Byrne, Poor Beast in the Rain directed by Conor McPherson playing the role of Georgie for which he was nominated for the "Irish Times Best Supporting Actor Award" in 2006. Laurence appeared in Saved directed by Jimmy Fay The Playboy of the Western World directed by Jimmy Fay. Kinlan also played Bartley in a major production of Martin McDonagh's The Cripple of Inishmaan directed by Garry Hynes, at Dublin Theatre Festival and the Atlantic Theater Company, Manhattan, New York. He portrayed the character Mossey Lannigan in Christ Deliver Us!, a new play by Tom Kilroy directed by Wayne Jordan at the Abbey Theatre, again receiving "Irish Times Best Supporting Actor Award" in 2011. Another role he landed was The Covey, in Wayne Jordan's The Plough and the Stars.

== Awards ==
- 2006: "Best Supporting Actor Award" at the Irish Times Theatre Awards for his role as Georgie in the play Poor Beast in the Rain staged in The Gate theatre in Dublin
- 2011: "Best Supporting Actor Award" at the Irish Times Theatre Awards for his role as Mossey Lannigan in the play Christ Deliver Us!, staged at the Abbey Theatre

2016: Best Supporting Actor Award" at the Irish Times Theatre Awards for his role as Doc in the play "The Night Alive" staged at the Gaiety Theatre

== Personal life ==
Born into a family of four boys, with three brothers, Kinlan is the son of Larry and Mary Kinlan. They lived in inner city Dublin. His father died after a long heroin addiction. Laurence was just 10 when his father died.

Laurence reportedly left school at 16 to pursue an acting career. He has 2 sons.

== Filmography ==
- 1998: Soft Sand, Blue Sea as David
- 1999: The Bill (TV Series, 1 episode – "Out and About" as Liam Ryan)
- 1999: Angela's Ashes as Older Paddy Clohessy
- 2000: Country as Michael
- 2000: Saltwater as Joe
- 2000: An Everlasting Piece as Mickey
- 2001: On the Nose as Kiaran Delaney
- 2001: Last Days in Dublin
- 2001: On Home Ground (1 episode – "John King" in lead role John King)
- 2003: Ned Kelly as Dan Kelly
- 2003: Veronica Guerin as Timmy, a young junky Timmy
- 2003: Intermission as a Drug Dealer
- 2004: The Halo Effect as a Thief
- 2005: Boy Eats Girl as Henry
- 2005: Breakfast on Pluto as Irwin
- 2006: Johnny Was as Michael
- 2006: Small Engine Repair as Tony
- 2007: My Boy Jack as Guardsman Doyle (TV film)
- 2011: The Guard as Photographer
- 2012: Vexed (TV Series – 1 episode – "Ian" as lead Ian)
- 2012: Immaturity for Charity (TV film)
- 2013: All Is by My Side as John
- 2013: Love/Hate (TV Series – Season 4 – 11 episodes))
- 2014: The Game (TV mini-series – 1 episode – "IRA Monkey")
- 2014: Charlie (TV mini-series – 1 episode "Tony Gregory" as lead act Tony Gregory)
- 2024: The Clean Up Crew as Danny

== Theatre ==
- On Such As We (2001) – role of Leonard
  - By Billy Roche directed by Wilson Milam, Peacock Theatre, Dublin
- Defender of the Faith (2004) – role of Thomas, an active volunteer
  - Play by Stuart Carolan, Peacock Theatre, Dublin
- Poor Beast in the Rain (2005) as Georgie
  - By Billy Roche directed by Conor McPherson, Gate Theatre, Dublin
- A Month in the Country (2006) – role of Aleksey Nikolayevich Belyayev
  - By Ivan Turgenev, adapted by Brian Friel, directed by Jason Byrne, Abbey Theatre, Dublin
- Saved (2007) – role of Sean
  - By Edward Bond, directed by Jimmy Fay, Peacock Theatre, Dublin
- The Playboy of the Western World – A New Version (2007) – role of Sean
  - by John Millington Synge. Adaptation by Bisi Adigun and Roddy Doyle. Directed by Jimmy Fay [Abbey Theatre]
- Christ Deliver Us! (2010) – role of Mossey Lannigan
  - By Tom Kilroy, directed by Wayne Jordan, [Abbey Theatre]
- The Plough and the Stars (2010) – role of The Young Covey
  - By Seán O'Casey, directed By Wayne Jordan [Abbey Theatre and international tour]
- The Cripple of Inishmaan (2011) – role of Bartley
  - Written by Martin McDonagh in Druid Theatre Company production. Play directed by Garry Hynes, [Dublin Theatre Festival and UK and Irish tour, Atlantic Theater Company, New York]
- Curse of the Starving Class (2011) – role of Emerson
  - By Sam Shepard [Abbey Theatre]
