= List of Love/Hate episodes =

The following is a list of episodes of the Irish television crime drama series Love/Hate, first broadcast on RTÉ One in 2010, and running for a total of twenty-eight episodes across five series. Proving to be one of the most popular series on Irish television since the millennium, the final two episodes of the second series first drew notoriety after attracting more than 600,000 viewers each. Following this, the series continued to attract a high level of viewing figures, with the final episode of the fifth series attracting more than a million viewers. In November 2015, RTÉ stated that there were no plans to make a sixth series, thus bringing the show to a close.

== Series overview ==
Series	Episodes	Originally broadcast	
Series	Episodes	Season premiere	Season finale
1	4	3 October 2010	24 October 2010
2	6	6 November 2011	11 December 2011
3	6	11 November 2012	16 December 2012
4	6	6 October 2013	10 November 2013
5	6	5 October 2014	9 November 2014

== Episodes ==
=== Series 1 (2010) ===
No. overall	No. in season	Title	Directed by	Written by	Original release date
1	1	"Episode 1"	David Caffrey	Stuart Carolan	3 October 2010
Darren Treacy (Robert Sheehan) returns to Dublin from Spain, having spent time there while trying to avoid the Gardai in Ireland for gun possession. Darren's brother Robbie (Chris Newman) is released from Wheatfield prison (called "Sarsfield" in the episode). While waiting to be collected by Tommy, Robbie is shot outside a newsagents in a drive by shooting. Darren rings Tommy to see what his delay is, which he covers up since he is sleeping with Darren and Robbie's sister Mary at the time. He is too late to meet with Robbie and on his arrival Robbie is dead. Nidge (Tom Vaughan-Lawlor) is Robbie's closest friend who has just purchased a gun and is currently learning how to use the weapon via a "YouTube" video. Darren is soon re-arrested but gang boss John Boy Power (Aidan Gillen) pays for a solicitor to bail Darren out of his gun charges, which are thrown out of court on a technicality. Darren's ex-girlfriend, Rosie (Ruth Negga), is now pregnant with Stumpy's baby.
2	2	"Episode 2"	David Caffrey	Stuart Carolan	10 October 2010
Mary Treacy gets advice from a psychic who tells her that Robbie is trying to get free from his past, which he insists is often the case with deaths involving violence. Darren isn't impressed by his sister's belief in what the psychic is telling her and is quick to confront the psychic, telling him that if he doesn't tell her that Robbie has moved on that he will be around again. John Boy is up in court and has organised the collection of drugs from Dublin Port by the rest of the gang. Tommy and Darren check out the warehouse where they are to sort out the drugs. Darren is quick to realize that the Gardaí are watching the warehouse. He calls John Boy to inform him that changes have to be made. Nidge has gone to collect the shipment. He is told to continue driving until a new place is found. Tommy finds a place from an old friend (JP) whose father has a car dealership; he asks him for the use of the garage for a half an hour. There the gang sort out all of the drugs into other bags to be distributed to other drug dealers around the city. Darren and Rosie plan to meet up in secret to discuss their relationship, while the rest of the gang are at John Boy's party at his apartment. John Boy tries to convince JP to use his father's dealership again. Nidge proposes to Trish. Darren stalks Jimmy Byrne whom he believes killed his brother Robbie.
3	3	"Episode 3"	David Caffrey	Stuart Carolan	17 October 2010
Nidge and the lads return from Nidge's stag weekend in Prague, Jimmy Byrne has returned from London. Nidge, Darren and Tommy attack Jimmy Byrne on his way home from the pub and drag him into the back of a Van to interrogate him about the murder of Darren's Brother. Jimmy insists he did not kill Robbie, Darren believes him and lets him go, both Nidge and Tommy are not happy. Hughie suggests to John Boy that he is going to kill Jimmy and gets a favor returned by Martin to help him with the murder. Hughie and Martin kill Jimmy in front of his wife and child. After a heavy night of drugs Hughie discovers that Eric, Nidge, Tommy and Darren have been taken in for questioning, while John Boy is arrested on his return from Amsterdam. Hughie begins to get paranoid as the newspaper suggest that he is a loose cannon and someone who John Boy will want dead. Hughie returns to Martin's caravan and kills him in a frenzied attack in which he thinks Martin talked to somebody. Hughie admits to John Boy - who is his half brother - that he killed Robbie over €300 he was owed. Stumpy's jealousy of Darren and Rosie reaches boiling point when he beats her and puts her in hospital. The Gardaí go to arrest Stumpy only to find he has left Rosie on her own. Stumpy asks John Boy for help, John Boy gives him a place to hide out. Darren calls John Boy after hearing of Jimmy's death, pointing out that it was Hughie who originally blamed him for Robbie's death and implying that Hughie is therefore the likely assassin. Clear divides have been made with John Boy, Hughie, Elmo and Stumpy on one side and Darren, Nidge and Tommy on the other.
4	4	"Episode 4"	David Caffrey	Stuart Carolan	24 October 2010
Rosie loses her baby and explains her pain to Darren. She doesn't want Darren to kill Stumpy but she wants him to feel pain. As Stumpy leaves his house Darren attacks him. Nidge goes to tell John Boy that he can go to the wedding but then John Boy backs out since Mary is Trish's bridesmaid. Hughie and Elmo attack Tommy and Darren. Elmo is shot during the shoot out. Hughie returns to John Boy and suggests revenge at the wedding. John Boy on the other hand decides to go to the wedding. Hughie makes a scene at the wedding, showing up Nidge's and Tommy's indiscretions in front of Trish and Mary. John Boy wants to leave the country with Hughie until everything dies down. Hughie decides to hunt down Tommy, with Elmo and his cousin Potsy. However, Hughie accidentally shoots himself while showing his gun off to Potsy. As he lies dying, Elmo decides to leave him rather than calling the emergency services. Darren leaves to join Rosie in London. Nidge and Tommy carry Hughie's coffin with John Boy. Darren meets with John Boy to shake hands and to put an end to the problems. After leaving with John Boy, Darren is fired upon by Stumpy in a drive-by shooting and is left for dead.

=== Series 2 (2011) ===
No. overall	No. in season	Title	Directed by	Written by	Original release date
5	1	"Episode 1"	David Caffrey	Stuart Carolan	6 November 2011
A year has passed since Darren's quest to uncover the identity of his brother's killer ended in him being shot by Stumpy. Now, almost fully recovered but tortured by PTSD, he is working as a gofer for newcomer Fran, a mid-level cannabis dealer, loan shark, and hooky cigarette smuggler. John Boy is also spiralling. He is haunted by a mysterious ghostly figure he keeps seeing on his apartment CCTV system. Profits are down in the ailing Irish economy, the police are closing in, the forensic accountants of C.A.B. are seizing his assets and business is generally being made impossible. John Boy plans to get his money out of the country and to retire to Spain, but his increasing cocaine use is making him more and more unpredictable. Meanwhile, all is not happy families with Nidge and Trish.
6	2	"Episode 2"	David Caffrey	Stuart Carolan	13 November 2011
Disaster strikes the gang when their drug mixing operation in a local hotel is busted by the Gardaí after Tommy and Aido are struck down by a bad batch of Cocaine. John Boy blames Stumpy, who he believes sold them out. Darren, desperate to get out of the game, plans an ATM robbery with Luke's help, and with the money recovered, makes a down payment to John Boy against the debt he owes. John Boy, however, wants Stumpy taken care of and he wants Darren to be the one to deal with it. Torn between killing his sworn enemy and concealing his sin from Rosie, Darren decides to take the opportunity to leave his old life behind. Meanwhile, Mary shows Luke some unexpected affection, but the troubled youngster misreads the signals, leading to the start of an unhealthy obsession.
7	3	"Episode 3"	David Caffrey	Stuart Carolan	20 November 2011
In an attempt to double-cross Fran, John Boy tips off the Gardaí warning them of an impending drugs shipment due in at the local docks. Not only does this secure his enemy is out of pocket, it also throws suspicion away from his real shipment, which enters the country undetected. Debbie continues to pursue Aido to supply her with Heroin. Fran retaliates against John Boy, who is left furious, and orders Nidge to pipe bomb his house, with Linda still inside. Torn between his feelings for Linda and betraying John Boy, Nidge decides to go ahead with the plan. Although Linda survives the attack, she is left badly scarred and is told that she will have to lose both of her breast implants. A furious Fran swears revenge on John Boy, forcing Nidge and the gang to go into hiding until the situation can be resolved.
8	4	"Episode 4"	Anthony Byrne	Stuart Carolan	27 November 2011
The gang are in festive spirits as Trish gives birth on Christmas Day. Rosie comes home to Dublin, and promises to give her relationship with Darren another try. Meanwhile, Mary is freaked to see a masked figure lurking in her garden in the dead of night, unaware that the creepy stalker is none other than Luke. With the gang war between John Boy and Fran still raging, John Boy orders Tommy — who is already torn between his friendship with Debbie and John Boy's increasing hold over Siobhan — to kill Fran. Although Tommy makes watertight plans to attack Fran in a council estate bookies, the hit goes badly wrong and he manages to escape scot-free. However, his day goes from bad to worse when he arrives home to find Linda slumped over in the bath, with both of her wrists cut.
9	5	"Episode 5"	Anthony Byrne	Stuart Carolan	4 December 2011
As tensions come to a head, the gang threatens to implode. Luke's obsession with Mary is becoming more dangerous, while Siobhan has a panic attack at the airport, unaware that her actions could place Tommy in grave danger. A paranoid John Boy finally tips over the edge when he finds Debbie taking heroin and interrogates her, forcing her to admit it that Aido is her supplier. Giving him one last job to square his debt, John Boy orders Darren to kill Aido, but Darren is conflicted as to whether he can kill again and discusses his concerns with Nidge. With Luke as his accomplice, a masked Darren prepares to carry out his orders, but in an unexpected turn of events, turns his gun on John Boy and executes him, revealing a double-cross that he and Nidge had secretly been planning.
10	6	"Episode 6"	Anthony Byrne	Stuart Carolan	11 December 2011
Nidge swiftly fills the power vacuum and ensures the gang that it's business as usual. Emotions run high at John Boy's funeral when solicitor Dave promises the remainder of his fortune to Kayleigh, although Nidge has other ideas. Rosie, who is unable to shift the thought that Darren was responsible for Stumpy's death, decides to end their relationship, unable to come to terms with the person her former lover has become. Darren is devastated, and tries to win her back, but has a much bigger problem to deal with. Mary has finally realised the extent of Luke's psychosis when she finds him lurking in her bedroom at night, and unable to sustain her paranoia any longer, orders Darren to take care of him. With Nidge's help, Darren lures Luke to an isolated forest where they execute and bury him.

=== Series 3 (2012) ===
No. overall	No. in season	Title	Directed by	Written by	Original release date
11	1	"Episode 1"	David Caffrey	Stuart Carolan	11 November 2012
After successfully removing John Boy, Nidge is determined not to make the same mistakes as his predecessor, but is blinded to the cracks appearing in his gang. When Aido is mistakenly shot by the CIRA, headed by renowned thug Christopher "Git" Loughman, Nidge plays the diplomat and tries to smooth things over. Darren, however, isn't prepared to let the matter lie and decides to throw a pipe bomb at Git's car. Although Nidge denies all knowledge of the attack, as a way of calming the situation, he persuades Git to join him and the gang for St. Patrick's day celebrations. The evening goes off without a hitch until Tommy catches a drunken Git trying to rape Siobhan, and beats him up. When Darren is forced to intervene, he kills Git.
12	2	"Episode 2"	David Caffrey	Stuart Carolan	18 November 2012
Fran assists Nidge with burying Git's body deep underground, but when Git's son Dano becomes suspicious of his father's disappearance, he confronts Nidge, determined to find out the truth. Knowing that Dano will continue to search for answers, Darren and Nidge concoct a plan to make Elmo the scapegoat, but their actions ultimately result in Darren being forced to carry out a hit on Elmo's cousin Gary and his wife. Tommy continues his illicit affair with Debbie, Darren finds himself an admirer in Dano's cousin Lizzie (who helps the hit on Gary along with her brothers Ray and Paddy), while Nidge finds his attraction to Dano's wife Georgina becoming increasingly uncontrollable. Meanwhile, as Siobhan struggles to come to terms with what happened, Tommy tries to persuade her to keep quiet and to not attend a sexual health clinic.
13	3	"Episode 3"	David Caffrey	Stuart Carolan	25 November 2012
Nidge struggles to remain on good terms with Dano, as his web of lies and excuses threatens to unravel. Siobhan confides in her friend Donna.
14	4	"Episode 4"	David Caffrey	Stuart Carolan	2 December 2012
Pressure builds on Nidge as the leaders of Dano's organisation send an inquisitor, Tony, down from the north to thwart him. Matters only get worse as his lies start to catch up with him, culminating in him beating up Tommy after he admits having an affair with Georgina. Donna is convinced by a friend to rat to the police about the rape of Siobhan.
15	5	"Episode 5"	David Caffrey	Stuart Carolan	9 December 2012
Darren rages at Nidge for beating up Tommy. Based on the information provided by Donna, the police eventually connect the dots around the disappearance of Git, and brings everyone in the gang in for questioning (including Siobhan and Trish, but not Darren or Fran), but they all refuse to talk. Meanwhile Dano is informed of this and, realising that Nidge and the lads were responsible for Git's death, plots to have him killed - against the wishes of Tony. Janet initially kicks Debbie out of the brothel for using drugs, but accepts part of Debbie's payments instead. She looks to move back into her mother's house, but steals her purse instead. Lizzie discovers Ray has died in his sleep. Fran shaves Donna's hair for speaking to the police.
16	6	"Episode 6"	David Caffrey	Stuart Carolan	16 December 2012
Ahead of a move to Spain, Nidge decides to return to his house to collect money and passports. While there he meets Darren and gives him some of the money he owes him to help finance his move to London. As he leaves, Nidge's car is ambushed by Dano and Paddy, with Nidge loaded into the boot of Dano's car. Darren rescues him, killing Paddy in the process. Nidge decides he will have to confront the situation, and goes to Dundalk to meet with Tony and arrange a deal, which involves betraying Darren. Darren escapes, but is shot and killed by Lizzie. This episode was watched by 970,600 people on its first air date.

=== Series 4 (2013) ===
No. overall	No. in season	Title	Directed by	Written by	Original release date
17	1	"Episode 1"	David Caffrey	Stuart Carolan	6 October 2013
Months after Darren was shot, Nidge is planning a tiger kidnapping. Tommy is out of hospital, but is clearly still showing the effects of the attack - still unaware it was Nidge who attacked him. Dano is still plotting to kill Nidge. Lizzie has recruited Wayne to hold on to a gun for her. The tiger kidnapping goes wrong, leaving Nidge having to improvise. A client, Andrew, has fallen behind on his tab at the brothel, with Nidge seeing an opportunity to extort him. Tommy is arrested after returning to the kidnap victim's house. Detective Inspector Moynihan talks to Siobhan about helping Tommy.
18	2	"Episode 2"	David Caffrey	Stuart Carolan	13 October 2013
Moynihan offers to help Tommy who refuses, however he later admits to Fran being a part of the operation, leading to the arrest of him, Elmo, and Ado. Nidge extorts Andrew into helping him import a large consignment of drugs through his dental surgery. Moynihan has set up a complex undercover operation (involving Ciaran, Terry, and Gavin) to track Nidge and ultimately bring him down. Ciaran release Elmo without charge to make it look like he's helping them, and later Gavin spray paints outside his apartment saying he's a rat. Nidge's mother is hospitalised with a stroke. Debbie is bringing in drugs as a foot passenger on the ferry. At Dano's request, Lizzie is about to shoot Nidge, but backs out at the last minute. Fran is beaten up in the pub by Noely Hughes for having an affair with his partner, who then attacks him again in his van leading to Fran being re-arrested.
19	3	"Episode 3"	David Caffrey	Stuart Carolan	20 October 2013
Tommy is hospitalised with complications from his head injury, and later released on bail. Fran plots revenge on Tommy after naming him to the Gardai. Elmo is paranoid that Nidge now thinks he's a rat. Tommy continues to exhibit strange behaviour. Fran convinces him to get into the van, however Siobhan sees him and gets Nidge to stop Tommy from being hurt. Nidge's mother dies. Andrew asks to get involved with Nidge's business. Nadine is pregnant with Ado's baby.
20	4	"Episode 4"	David Caffrey	Stuart Carolan	27 October 2013
Nidge has the flu. Fran organises a dummy run to bring supplies in to Andrew's warehouse. Fran's friend Deano discovers that Noely's mother had died three months ago. Lizzie and Wayne break into Nidge's house looking to shoot him, but he successfully hides from them. On their way back, they crash into another car and Lizzie beats up the other driver, subsequently getting arrested. Elmo kidnaps Wayne and brings him to Nidge. The Gardai arrive, but Wayne covers for Nidge. Moynihan has a bug planted in both Nidge's car and the warehouse. Fran digs up Noely's mother's body, urinating on it. For disobeying Tony's orders not to attack Nidge, Dano is shot by the Continuity IRA and dies.
21	5	"Episode 5"	David Caffrey	Stuart Carolan	3 November 2013
Nidge has been staying and sleeping with Janet, but is getting paranoid that Fran is going to find out it was him that pipe bombed his house after a conversation with Patrick. Siobhan tells Moynihan that she is worried about Tommy, and that she knows it was Nidge that attacked him. Moynihan tells Andrew he knows about the delivery, and that he needs to cooperate with him. Debbie dies following a drug overdose. Nidge and Wayne attack Patrick, but he escapes. Following the botched attack, Nidge returns to his house.
22	6	"Episode 6"	David Caffrey	Stuart Carolan	10 November 2013
Patrick and his family escape on the ferry. Nidge has enlisted the security van driver to handle transporting the delivery. Wayne is murdered on Nidge’s order. Fran is unhappy that Nidge isn’t giving him all the details on the delivery. He goes to question Andrew, killing him when he realises he’s been speaking to the police. Nadine tells Ado she had an abortion. Tommy is enlisted by Nidge, who collapses before the delivery arrives. Seeing this, Moynihan chooses to save Tommy rather than proceed with the operation. Despite losing the consignment Nidge celebrates, knowing the Gardai have no case against him. Siobhan tells Moynihan she’ll help him get Nidge.

=== Series 5 (2014) ===
No. overall	No. in season	Title	Directed by	Written by	Original release date
23	1	"Episode 1"	David Caffrey	Stuart Carolan	5 October 2014
After almost losing everything to DI Moynihan's sting operation, Nidge travels to Spain to negotiate with wholesale supplier Terence May for a new drugs shipment. In a flashback, Fran reveals he has a bone from Git’s body. Andrew’s remains are discovered, leading to Fran being questioned. Nidge threatens Fran. Patrick has returned looking to kill Nidge. Lizzie is released from prison, however is murdered by Glen. Nidge is beaten up by Patrick’s gang. Back in Spain, Terence agrees to loan Nidge the money on condition his nephew Paulie supervises him. Siobhan overheard Fran talking about the bone. Tommy is still in a coma. Nidge and Patrick meet to sort things out on Terence’s order, but Patrick refuses the peace offering.
24	2	"Episode 2"	David Caffrey	Stuart Carolan	12 October 2014
Siobhan and Paulie start seeing each other, as do Nadine and Ado’s friend Scotty. Paulie offers to have Patrick killed. Moynihan is struggling to get more resources to sustain the operation. Patrick is shot at by Paulie, but survives due to his bullet proof vest. Fran goes to speak to Patrick against Nidge’s orders, but Patrick tells him it was Nidge that attacked Linda. Fran is devastated, and vows to kill Nidge. He gets a gun from Patrick, but is seen by Ciaran and intercepted. Nidge visits him in prison but Fran attacks him.
25	3	"Episode 3"	David Caffrey	Stuart Carolan	19 October 2014
Fran remains in prison alongside Noely. Nidge tells Ado to get Potsy to kill him. Nidge wants Elmo to be more hands on. Siobhan gets high in the pub, and contemplates jumping off the roof. The drugs shipment arrives, concealed in garden gnomes, which Elmo buries. Janet’s son Aran has fallen in with the wrong crowd. She asks Nidge to speak to him. Ado monitors Deano’s movements after he visits Fran in prison. Potsy attacks Fran, but loses an eye. Terry is getting frustrated with Moynihan’s handling of the operation. Ado and Elmo kidnap Deano, who tells Nidge what Fran did to Noely’s mother.
26	4	"Episode 4"	David Caffrey	Stuart Carolan	26 October 2014
Nidge tells Deano he’s working for him now while still helping Fran, and orders Ado to kill Patrick. Tommy briefly wakes up from his coma. Ado enlists Packie to help with the hit. Nidge visits Noely in prison, and tells him about Fran and his mother’s body. Siobhan tells Moynihan that the gang is meeting at the zoo, and gets information from Deano about Git’s bone. Nidge wants to use Scotty as a driver. Paulie spots the Gardai at the zoo, and tells Nidge they have a rat. Noely tells Fran that Nidge had an affair with Linda. Packie shoots at Patrick but misses, hitting his son Brandon instead, however Brandon survives. Patrick captures Packie as he escapes. Nidge moves his family out, in the knowledge that they will also now be a target. Moynihan reveals to Ciaran that Scotty is working for him. Paulie realises Siobhan is the rat, however she pushes him off the balcony of her apartment, killing him. Packie pleads for his life, but Patrick executes him.
27	5	"Episode 5"	David Caffrey	Stuart Carolan	2 November 2014
Moynihan questions Siobhan about what happened to Paulie. Nidge is becoming more paranoid. Terence flies in for the funeral and warns Nidge that he will kill Siobhan if he finds out she’s responsible. Siobhan demands to know from Deano where the bone is. Aran is arrested again. Terence meets with Siobhan, who accepts her story about the circumstances of Paulie’s death. Scotty angers Moynihan about his affair with Nadine, knowing that his evidence would now be inadmissible. Elmo is arrested with drugs from the consignment in the car with him. Fran injures himself in prison, then escapes from the hospital. Siobhan goes to Fran’s caravan and steals the bone, however she has to hide when Fran and Deano arrives. Fran tells Deano he knows about his work with Nidge, and kills him, witnessed by Siobhan. Nidge sees a Gardai community officer phoning Janet, and wonders if she’s the rat.
28	6	"Episode 6"	David Caffrey	Stuart Carolan	9 November 2014
Nidge flies out to Spain, where Terence tells him he wants Janet murdered as an example to find the rat - she is tortured and killed by Terence’s gang. Siobhan tells Moynihan that Nidge has Git’s bone, and that Nidge killed him. Fran gets a gun to kill Nidge. Nadine and Ado split up, and she takes over running the brothel. Moynihan stops Nidge’s car, and beats Nidge up. Nadine sees Fran, and warns Nidge. Fran is rearrested and returned to prison, where he is later sexually assaulted by Noely and his gang with a pool cue. Siobhan tells Nidge she knows he beat Tommy, that the Gardai think he killed Git, and that she has planted Git’s bone in his house. Patrick arrives and opens fire, shooting Siobhan. In front of both Trish and Warren, Patrick shoots Nidge multiple times.
