= On the Nose =

On the Nose may refer to:

- On the Nose (film), a 2001 film by David Caffrey
- "On the Nose", a pricing game on The Price Is Right
- "On the Nose", an Australian and New Zealand punting horse race wager
