= 11th Irish Film & Television Awards =

Annual Irish media awards ceremony

- Date: 5 April 2014
- Site: DoubleTree by Hilton, Burlington Road, Dublin
- Hosted by: Simon Delaney and Laura Whitmore

Highlights
- Best Film: Calvary
- Best Direction: Neil Jordan; Byzantium
- Best Actor: Brendan Gleeson; Calvary
- Best Actress: Saoirse Ronan; Byzantium
- Most awards: Byzantium (3); Calvary (3); Philomena (3)
- Most nominations: Love/Hate (8)

Television coverage
- Channel: RTÉ One

The 11th Irish Film & Television Awards took place on Saturday 5 April 2014 in Dublin, honouring Irish film and television released in 2013. The nominations were announced on 27 February 2014. The Awards Ceremony took place at the DoubleTree by Hilton Burlington Road Dublin, and was broadcast on RTÉ One at 9.45pm. The Annual Irish Film & Television Awards are the highlight of Ireland’s entertainment and cultural calendar celebrating the very best of Irish screen talent across film and television. Guests in attendance included Michael Fassbender, Colin Farrell, Jamie Dornan, Steve Coogan, Will Forte, Jeremy Irons, Fionnula Flanagan, Brendan Gleeson, Neil Jordan, Amy Huberman, Colm Meaney, Jack Reynor, Killian Scott, Eva Birthistle, Victoria Smurfit and Outstanding Contribution Honorary Award Winner President Michael D Higgins.

Simon Delaney and Laura Whitmore co-hosted the event.

The President of Ireland, Michael D. Higgins, received an honorary award in recognition of his outstanding contribution to the Irish film and television industry.

The big winners on the night were the films Calvary, Byzantium, and Philomena, which all picked up three awards each. Calvary took the highest accolade, Best Film, along with Best Actor for Brendan Gleeson and Best Script for its writer-director John Michael McDonagh. The touching true story Philomena won the award for Best International Film and Actress (for Judi Dench), along with Costume Design for Consolata Boyle. Philomena Lee, whose true life story inspired the film, was in attendance at the Ceremony. Vampire horror film Byzantium’s awards included the prestigious Best Director for Neil Jordan, Best Actress for Saoirse Ronan, and Makeup & Hair.

== Awards ==
Awards were presented in 42 categories.

=== Film categories ===
Film

- Byzantium- Alan Moloney, Stephen Woolley, Parallel Films, Number 9 Films
- Calvary - James Flynn, Chris Clark, Flora Fernandez Marengo, Octagon Films, Reprisal Films
- Run & Jump - Tamara Angie, David Collins, Martina Niland, Samson Films
- The Sea - David Collins, Samson Films
- The Stag - Robert Walpole, Rebecca O'Flanagan, Treasure Entertainment

Director in Film

- The Stag - John Butler
- Byzantium - Neil Jordan
- Calvary - John Michael McDonagh
- The Last Days on Mars - Ruairi Robinson

Script Film

- John Banville - The Sea
- Ailbhe Keogan - Run & Jump
- John Michael McDonagh - Calvary
- John Butler and Peter McDonald - The Stag

Actor in a Lead Role in a Feature Film

- Brendan Gleeson - Calvary
- Domhnall Gleeson - About Time
- Ciarán Hinds - The Sea
- Andrew Scott - The Stag

Actress in a Lead Role in a Feature Film

- Antonia Campbell-Hughes - 3096 Days
- Jane McGrath - Black Ice
- Saoirse Ronan - Byzantium
- Kelly Thornton - Life's A Breeze

Actress in a Supporting Role in a Feature Film

- Sinéad Cusack - The Sea
- Fionnula Flanagan - Life's A Breeze
- Amy Huberman - The Stag
- Orla O'Rourke - Calvary

Actor in a Supporting Role in a Feature Film

- Colin Farrell - Saving Mr. Banks
- Michael Fassbender - 12 Years a Slave
- Edward MacLiam - Run & Jump
- Peter McDonald - The Stag

George Morrison Feature Documentary Award

- Broken Song - Zucca Films
- Here Was Cuba - Crossing the Line Films
- Natan - Screenworks
- The Summit - Image Now Films

Special Irish Language Award

- 1916: Seachtar Dearmadta
- An Ceoldráma
- Scúp
- Páidí Ó Sé – Rí an Pharóiste

Animation

- Doc McStuffins - Brown Bag
- Henry Hugglemonster - Brown Bag
- The Octonauts - Brown Bag
- Tilly & Friends - Jam Media

Philips Short Film Award

- The Last Days Of Peter Bergmann - Fastnet Films
- The Missing Scarf - Belly Creative
- Rubaí - Magamedia
- SLR - Stigma Films

=== International categories ===
International Film sponsored by American Airlines

- 12 Years a Slave
- Gravity
- Philomena
- The Wolf of Wall Street

International Actor

- Leonardo DiCaprio — The Wolf of Wall Street
- Michael Douglas — Behind the Candelabra
- Chiwetel Ejiofor — 12 Years a Slave
- Matthew McConaughey — Dallas Buyers Club

International Actress

- Amy Adams — American Hustle
- Cate Blanchett — Blue Jasmine
- Sandra Bullock — Gravity
- Judi Dench — Philomena

=== Television Drama categories ===
Best Drama – In Association with the BAI

- The Fall
- Game of Thrones
- Love/Hate
- Quirke - "Elegy For April"
- Vikings

Writer – Television Drama

- Stuart Carolan - Love/Hate
- Neil Jordan - The Borgias
- Nick Vincent Murphy & Chris O'Dowd - Moone Boy
- Conor McPherson - Quirke ("Elegy For April")

Director – Television Drama

- David Caffrey - Love/Hate
- Ciaran Donnelly - Vikings
- Ian Fitzgibbon - Moone Boy
- Thaddeus O'Sullivan - Amber

Actor in a Lead Role – Television

- Gabriel Byrne - Quirke ("Elegy For April")
- Jamie Dornan - The Fall
- Chris O'Dowd - Moone Boy
- Tom Vaughan-Lawlor - Love/Hate

Actress in a Lead Role – Television

- Eva Birthistle - Amber
- Charlie Murphy - Love/Hate
- Mary Murray - Love/Hate
- Deirdre O'Kane - Moone Boy

Actor in a Supporting Role – Television

- Peter Coonan - Love/Hate
- Liam Cunningham - Game of Thrones
- Aidan Gillen - Game of Thrones
- Allen Leech - Downton Abbey

Actress in a Supporting Role – Television

- Elaine Cassidy - The Paradise
- Caoilfhionn Dunne - Love/Hate
- Michelle Fairley - Game of Thrones
- Victoria Smurfit - Dracula

=== Craft/Technical categories (Film/TV Drama) ===
Costume Design

- Joan Bergin - Vikings
- Consolata Boyle - Philomena
- Lorna Marie Mugan - Ripper Street
- Leonie Prendergast - Moone Boy

Director of Photography

- PJ Dillon - Ripper Street
- Kate McCullough - Here Was Cuba
- Ruairi O'Brien - The Fall
- Robbie Ryan - Philomena

Editing

- Úna Ní Dhonghaíle - Ripper Street
- Nathan Nugent - Run & Jump
- Emer Reynolds - Here Was Cuba
- Nick Emerson, Jake Roberts - Starred Up

Make-up & Hair Sponsored by M·A·C

- Byzantium
- Ripper Street
- The Fall
- Vikings

Original Score

- Liam Bates - Earthbound
- Patrick Cassidy - Calvary
- David Holmes - The Fall
- Nick Seymour - The Summit

Production Design

- Tom Conroy - Vikings
- Mark Geraghty - Ripper Street
- Tom McCullough - The Fall
- Donal Woods - Downton Abbey

Sound

- Ronan Hill - Game of Thrones
- Here Was Cuba
- Last Days on Mars
- Ripper Street

=== Craft/Technical categories (Television) ===
Director – Television

- Colm Bairéad - An Ceoldráma
- Tom Johnson - Áine Lawlor: Facing Cancer
- Anna Rodgers - Somebody to Love
- Maurice Sweeney - John Sheahan: A Dubliner

Director of Photography — Television

- Barry Donnellan - Secrets of the Irish Landscape
- Ronan Fox - John Sheahan: A Dubliner
- Richard Kendrick - In Good Hands The Power of Metal
- John Murray - The Secret Life of the Shannon

Editing – Television

- Mick Mahon - John Sheahan: A Dubliner
- Mick Mahon - We Got Game
- Emer Reynolds - The Secret Life of the Shannon
- Ray Roantree - Looking After No. 1

Sound – Television

- 1916: Seachtar Dearmadta
- John Sheahan: A Dubliner
- R.O.G.
- The Secret Life of the Shannon

=== Television categories ===
Children's/Youth Programme

- An Ceoldráma
- Doc McStuffins
- Octonauts
- Punky

Current Affairs/News

- Breach of Trust (RTÉ)
- Inside Irish Nationwide (Animo for RTÉ)
- Spotlight - Housing: Whatever It Takes (BBC NI)
- Tonight with Vincent Browne (TV3)

Documentary

- Danny Boy: The Ballad that Bewitched the World
- Donal Walsh - My Story
- The Disappeared
- The Scholarship - Class of 2018

Documentary Series

- 1916: Seachtar Dearmadta
- Bliain in Árainn Mhór
- The Estate
- John Lonergan's Circus

Entertainment Programme

- Irish Pictorial Weekly
- The Late Late Show
- Moone Boy
- Mrs. Brown's Boys

Factual Programme

- John Sheahan: A Dubliner
- Nationwide
- Seamus Heaney - Postscript - Iarscríbhinn
- The Zoo

Reality Programme

- Dúshlán 1881 - Living the Eviction
- The Great Irish Bake Off
- Jockey Eile
- Operation Transformation

Sports

- Batmen
- Páidí Ó Sé - Rí an Pharóiste
- R.O.G: The Ronan O'Gara Documentary
- We Got Game

== Special ==
=== Rising Star Award ===
- Jamie Dornan (Actor — The Fall, New Worlds, Once Upon a Time, Racing Hearts)
  - John Butler (Director/Writer — Immaturity for Charity, The Stag, Your Bad Self)
  - Peter Coonan (Actor — Get Up & Go, King of the Travellers Love/Hate, Stalker)
  - Steph Green (Director/Writer — New Boy, Run & Jump)

=== Honorary Award ===
IFTA Outstanding Contribution to the Film and TV Industry Award

- Michael D. Higgins
