= Charlie (TV series) =

- Genre: Drama
- Based on: Charlie Haughey
- Written by: Colin Teevan
- Directed by: Kenneth Glenaan
- Starring: Aidan Gillen; Tom Vaughan-Lawlor; Peter O'Meara; Lucy Cohu; Risteard Cooper; Gavin O'Connor Fíonna Hewitt Twamley
- Country of origin: Ireland
- Original language: English
- No. of seasons: 1
- No. of episodes: 3

Production
- Cinematography: Peter Robertson
- Editor: Nathan Nugent
- Running time: 72 minutes
- Production companies: Touchpaper Television; Element Pictures

Original release
- Network: RTÉ
- Release: January 4 – January 18, 2015

Charlie is a historical drama mini-series broadcast on RTÉ Television. The show premiered on 4 January 2015 at 21:30 on RTÉ One and on RTÉ Player. The show depicts the central figure of Irish politics in the 1980s, Charles Haughey. This drama is based on real events, exploring the emergence of modern Ireland through the rise and fall of Charles Haughey.

== Plot ==
The drama is set in democratic Ireland in the late 1970s. Charlie Haughey is the Taoiseach of Ireland, (portrayed by Aidan Gillen) and his loyal servant, P.J Mara (portrayed by Tom Vaughan-Lawlor). The main focus of the drama is on Haughey and his circle, and the drama largely remains true to life while capturing the excitement and menace that was in the air.

== Cast ==
- Aidan Gillen as Charles Haughey
- Tom Vaughan-Lawlor as P. J. Mara
- Lucy Cohu as Terry Keane
- Peter O'Meara as Brian Lenihan Snr
- Risteárd Cooper as Dermot Nally
- Gavin O'Connor as Seán Doherty
- Marcus Lamb as Des O'Malley
- Edward MacLiam as Ray McSharry
- Peter Gowen as George Colley
- Frankie McCafferty as Des Traynor
- Fergal McElherron as Albert Reynolds
- John Connors as Jimmy
- Jody O'Neill as Geraldine Kennedy
- Rory Nolan as Charlie McCreevy
- Gus McDonagh as Bertie Ahern
- Sinead Watters as Jacinta
- Frances Tomelty as Sarah Haughey
- Laurence Kinlan as Tony Gregory
- Andrew Stanley as Gallagher
- David Herlihy as Ray Burke
- Fíonna Hewitt Twamley as Philomena

== Episodes ==
No.	Title	Directed by	Written by	Original release date
1	"Rise"	Kenneth Glenaan	Colin Teevan	January 4, 2015
Charlie looks to get approval within the Fianna Fáil party as he goes up against party leader Jack Lynch for leadership.
2	"GUBU"	Kenneth Glenaan	Colin Teevan	January 11, 2015
3	"Fall"	Charlie McCarthy	Colin Teevan	January 18, 2015
