= Seán Ó Cualáin =

- Spouse(s): DEIRDRE UÍ CHUALÁIN. A native of Cill Chiarán. Daughter of poet and writer JACKIE MAC DONNCHA

Seán Ó Cualáin is an IFTA-award-winning Irish documentary and feature film film director. He directed Dara Beag — File Pobail in 2004, Rí an Fhocail in 2007, Lón sa Spéir/Men at Lunch in 2012, Mise Raiftearaí an Fíodóir Focal/I am Raftery, The Weaver of Words, written by Tadhg Mac Dhonnagáin in 2013, Crash and Burn (about racing driver Tommy Byrne) in 2016.

He is a native of Loch Con Aortha, Cill Chiaráin.

== Accolades ==
- Special Irish Language Award - Lón sa Spéir -10th Irish Film & Television Awards
- Official selection - Dara Beag — File Pobail - WorldFest Houston 2004
