= 10th Irish Film & Television Awards =

Annual Irish film and television awards ceremony

- Date: 9 February 2013
- Site: Convention Centre Dublin
- Hosted by: Simon Delaney

Highlights
- Best Film: What Richard Did
- Best Actor: Jack Reynor, What Richard Did
- Best Actress: Ruth Bradley; Grabbers
- Most awards: Love/Hate (6)
- Most nominations: Love/Hate (9)

Television coverage
- Channel: RTÉ One
- Duration: 135 mins
- Viewership: 1.24 million viewers

The 10th Irish Film & Television Awards took place on Saturday 9 February 2013 at the Convention Centre Dublin (CCD) honouring Irish film and television released in 2012. It was hosted by Irish actor Simon Delaney and attracted an audience of 1.24 million viewers. The Show was broadcast on RTÉ One Television on the night.

Big winners on the night included RTÉ crime-drama Love/Hate which took home six awards, including awards for Best Drama, Best Director David Caffrey, and Writer TV Stuart Carolan. Actors Tom Vaughan-Lawlor, Charlie Murphy, and Susan Loughnane won awards for Actor Lead TV Drama, Actress Lead TV, and Actress Support TV Drama respectively.

What Richard Did picked up five awards including the award for Best Film. Jack Reynor won for Actor Lead Film whilst Lenny Abrahamson and Malcolm Campbell picked up awards for Best Director and Script with Nathan Nugent winning for Editing — Film.

Internationally, Argo and Daniel Day-Lewis in Lincoln matched their respective Academy Award wins, while Marion Cotillard won Best Actress for Rust and Bone.

Rising Star Award nominees were announced prior to the ceremony on 30 January 2013. The winner was writer/director Gerard Barrett, whose film Pilgrim Hill would later premiere on 12 April 2013.

== Winners and nominees ==
- Technical categories are combined for both film and television.

=== Film ===
Best Film	Best Director
What Richard Did (producers: Ed Guiney, Andrew Lowe); Death of a Superhero (producers: Andrew Eaton, Chris Martin); Good Vibrations (producers: Michael Garland, Astrid Kahmke); Grabbers (producers: David Collins, Martina Niland); Shadow Dancer (producers: Ed Guiney, Andrew Lowe)	Lenny Abrahamson – What Richard Did; Pat Collins – Silence; Ian Fitzgibbon – Death of a Superhero; Martin McDonagh – Seven Psychopaths
Best Lead Actor	Best Lead Actress
Jack Reynor – What Richard Did as Richard Karlsen; Richard Dormer – Good Vibrations as Terri Hooley; Colin Farrell – Seven Psychopaths as Marty Faranan; Martin McCann – Jump as Pearse Kelly	Ruth Bradley – Grabbers as Garda Lisa Nolan; Anne-Marie Duff – Sanctuary as Maire; Seána Kerslake – Dollhouse as Jeannie; Róisín Murphy – What Richard Did as Lara Hogan
Best Supporting Actor	Best Supporting Actress
Domhnall Gleeson – Anna Karenina as Konstantin "Kostya" Dmitrievich Levin; Ciarán Hinds – The Woman in Black as Sam Daily; Michael McElhatton – Death of a Superhero as James Clarke; David Wilmot – Shadow Dancer as Kevin Mulville	Bríd Brennan – Shadow Dancer as Ma; Bronagh Gallagher – Grabbers as Una Maher; Charlene McKenna – Jump as Marie; Gabrielle Reidy – What Richard Did as Eileen Harris
Best Script	Best International Film
What Richard Did – Malcolm Campbell; Grabbers – Kevin Lehane; Jump – Steve Brookes, Kieron J Walsh (based on play by Lisa McGee); Seven Psychopaths – Martin McDonagh	Argo; Amour; Life of Pi; Lincoln
Best International Actor	Best International Actress
Daniel Day-Lewis – Lincoln as President Abraham Lincoln; Ben Affleck – Argo as CIA Officer Tony Mendez; Bradley Cooper – Silver Linings Playbook as Patrizio Solitano Jr.; Joaquin Phoenix – The Master as Freddie Quell	Marion Cotillard – Rust and Bone as Stéphanie; Jennifer Lawrence – Silver Linings Playbook as Tiffany Maxwell; Andrea Riseborough – Shadow Dancer as Collette McVeigh; Emmanuelle Riva – Amour as Anne Laurent
Best Live Action Short Film	Best Animated Short Film
Morning – Cathy Brady; Fear of Flying – Andrew Legge; The Girl with the Mechanical Maiden – Conor Finnegan; Rhinos – Shimmy Marcus	Macropolis – Joel Simon; After You – Damien O'Connor; Fear of Flying – Conor Finnegan; Peter Rabbit's Christmas Tale – David McCamley
George Morrison Feature Documentary	Best Special – Irish Language
Lón sa Spéir — Seán Ó Cualáin; Bernard Dunne's 'Bród Club' — Bernard Dunne; Congo 1961: An Irish Affair — Brendan Culleton & Irina Maldea; Rásaí na Gaillimhe — Robert Quinn	Mea Maxima Culpa: Silence in the House of God – Alex Gibney; Barbaric Genius – Paul Duane; John Ford: Dreaming the Quiet Man – Sé Merry Doyle; Skin in the Game – Donald Taylor Black
Screen Ireland Rising Star Award
Gerard Barrett (Director/Editor/Producer/Writer — Pilgrim Hill, The Valley of Knockanure); Lisa Barros D'Sa & Glenn Leyburn (Directors/Producers — Cherrybomb, The Good Man, Good Vibrations); Ciarán Foy (Director/Writer — Citadel, The Faeries of Blackheath Woods); Jack Reynor (Actor — Dollhouse, Leopard, What Richard Did)

=== Television ===
Best Television Series	Best Entertainment Programme
Love/Hate; The Borgias; Game of Thrones; Titanic: Blood & Steel	Moone Boy; Mrs. Brown's Boys; The Savage Eye; The Voice of Ireland
Best Lead Actor	Best Lead Actress
Tom Vaughan-Lawlor – Love/Hate as Nigel "Nidge" Delaney; Gabriel Byrne – Secret State as Prime Minister Tom Dawkins; Colm Meaney – Hell on Wheels as Thomas "Doc" Durant; Robert Sheehan – Love/Hate as Darren Treacy	Charlie Murphy – Love/Hate as Siobhán Delaney; Orla Brady – Sinbad as Taryn; Carrie Crowley – Rásaí na Gaillimhe as Superintendent Siobhán Harte; Amy Huberman – threesome as Alice Heston
Best Supporting Actor	Best Supporting Actress
Andrew Scott – Sherlock as Professor James Moriarty; Peter Coonan – Love/Hate as Fran Cooney; Allen Leech – Downton Abbey as Tom Branson; Chris O'Dowd – Moone Boy as Seán Caution Murphy	Susan Loughnane – Love/Hate as Debbie; Cathy Belton – Roy as Maura O'Brien; Deirdre O'Kane – Moone Boy as Debra Moone; Ruth Negga — Secret State as GCHQ Analyst Agnes Evans
Best Direction – Series	Best Script
David Caffrey – Love/Hate; Ciarán Donnelly – Titanic: Blood & Steel; Declan Lowney – Moone Boy; Aisling Walsh – Loving Miss Hatto	Love/Hate – Stuart Carolan; The Borgias – Neil Jordan; Moone Boy – Nick Vincent Murphy & Chris O'Dowd; Saving the Titanic – Colin Heber-Percy & Lyall Watson
Best Direction – Reality or Non-Fiction	Best Reality Series
Maurice Sweeney — WB Yeats – No Country for Old Men; Lynda McQuaid — MasterChef Ireland; Alison Millar — This World: "The Shame of the Catholic Church"; Damien O'Donnell — The Savage Eye	Jockey Eile; Come Dine with Me Ireland; ICA Bootcamp; MasterChef Ireland
Best Current Affairs/News Programme	Best Factual Programme
Spotlight: "Seán Quinn's Missing Millions"; Midweek: "Rural Ireland Fights Back"; Prime Time: "Profiting from Prostitution"; Tonight with Vincent Browne: "Vincent Browne vs. the Troika"	The Radharc Squad; Dead Money; Room to Improve; The Zoo
Best Children's/Youth Programme	Best Sports Programme
Roy; Octonauts; OMG! Jedward's Dream Factory; ÓTholg go Tolg	When Ali Came to Ireland; Jump Boys; London 2012 Summer Olympics; London 2012 Summer Paralympics
Best Documentary Series	Best Documentary Programme
#bullyPROOF; 24 Hours to Kill; The New Irish – After the Bust; Ray D'Arcy: How to Beat Depression	Congo 1961: An Irish Affair; MND: The Inside Track; A Time to Die?; WB Yeats – No Country for Old Men

=== Craft & Technical (Film and Television) ===
Best Cinematography (Film/TV)	Best Cinematography (Programme)
Anna Karenina – Seamus McGarvey; Citadel – Tim Fleming; Game of Thrones – PJ Dillon; What Richard Did – David Grennan	Gaeil Nua-Eabhrac – Michael O'Donovan; Lorg na gCos: Súil Siar ar Mise Éire – Feargal O'Hanlon; My Civil War – Kieran Slyne; WB Yeats – No Country for Old Men – Ronan Fox & Mick O'Rourke
Best Editing (Film/TV)	Best Editing (Programme)
What Richard Did – Nathan Nugent; Love/Hate – Dermot Diskin; Ripper Street – Helen Chapman; Saving the Titanic – Mick Mahon	Inside the Department – Brenda Morrissey; Chaplin: The Waterville Picture – Mick Mahon; Gaeil Nua-Eabhrac – Mick Mahon; The West's Awake – Zaini Darragh
Best Production Design (Film/TV)	Best Costume Design (Film/TV)
Ripper Street – Mark Geraghty; Love/Hate – Stephen Daly; Saving the Titanic – Ray Ball; Titanic: Blood & Steel – Tom Conroy	Good Vibrations – Maggie Donnelly; King of the Travellers – Joan O'Cleary; Love/Hate – Alison Byrne; Ripper Street – Lorna Marie Mugan
Best Original Score (Film/TV)	Best Hair & Makeup (Film/TV)
Loving Miss Hatto – Niall Byrne; Love/Hate – Ray Harman; Saving the Titanic – Steve Lynch; What Richard Did – Stephen Rennicks	Ripper Street – Eileen Buggy & Sharon Doyle; Loving Miss Hatto – Dee Corcoran & Morna Ferguson; Shadow Dancer – Eileen Buggy & Lynn Johnston; Titanic: Blood & Steel – Dee Corcoran & Tom McInerney
Best Sound (Film/TV)	Best Sound (Programme)
Citadel – Steve Fanagan, Garret Farrell, Hugh Fox; Game of Thrones – Ronan Hill, Mervyn Moore; Titanic: Blood & Steel – Dan Birch, Garret Farrell, Jon Stevenson; What Richard Did – Niall Brady, Steve Fanagan, Paddy Hanlon	Am an Ghátair – John Brennan, Conall de Cléir, Mark Henry; Scéal na Gaeilge – Niall O'Sullivan, Paul Rowland; WB Yeats – No Country for Old Men – Killian Fitzgerald, Flachra O'Hanlon; The West's Awake – Zaini Darragh, Killian Fitzgerald, David O'Regan
