= 8th Irish Film & Television Awards =

2011 Irish film and television awards

- Date: 12 February 2011
- Site: Convention Centre Dublin
- Hosted by: Simon Delaney

Highlights
- Best Film: As If I Am Not There
- Best Actor: Martin McCann; Swansong: Story of Occi Byrne
- Best Actress: Amy Huberman; Rewind
- Most awards: As If I Am Not There (3); The Tudors (3)
- Most nominations: Love/Hate (10)

The 8th Irish Film & Television Awards were held on 12 February 2011 in the Convention Centre, Dublin.

It was hosted by actor Simon Delaney and honoured Irish film and television released in 2010. The Awards show was broadcast live on RTÉ One television in Ireland.

Irish producer Morgan O'Sullivan was presented with the Outstanding Contribution to Industry Award. The Bosnian war drama As If I Am Not There won the best film, script and director awards. Martin McCann scooped the lead actor award for his performance in Swansong – Story of Occi Byrne while Amy Huberman received the lead actress award for Rewind. Pierce Brosnan and Saoirse Ronan both won awards for their supporting roles in the international features The Ghost and The Way Back respectively, while Stephen Rea and Ruth McCabe received IFTAs for their performances in the television drama Single Handed. In television drama, the fourth and final season of The Tudors was named best drama series/soap which followed awards for the series' craft team in costume design Joan Bergin and make-up and Hair. Live Aid biopic When Harvey Met Bob received the IFTA for single drama/ drama serial and its star Domhnall Gleeson was announced the winner of the rising star award and lead actor television awards. In the international categories, David Fincher's The Social Network won the IFTA for international film with its star Jesse Eisenberg winning for best international actor. Annette Bening received the international actress award for her performance in The Kids Are All Right. The Republic of Telly's premiere of the Rubberbandits' Horse Outside took the people's choice award for best TV moment of the year. The late Gerry Ryan was honoured when his daughter accepted an award on his behalf for Operation Transformation, which won Best Factual Programme.

== Awards ==
=== Awards in Film ===
Best Film

- As If I Am Not There (Winner)
  - Perrier's Bounty
  - Sensation
  - Swansong
  - The Runway

Director in Film

- Juanita Wilson – As If I Am Not There (Winner)
  - PJ Dillon – Rewind
  - Tom Hall – Sensation
  - Ian Power – The Runway

Script Film

- Juanita Wilson- As If I Am Not There (Winner)
  - Will Collins – My Brothers
  - Conor McDermottroe – Swansong – Story of Occi Byrne
  - Mark O'Rowe – Perrier's Bounty

Actor in a lead role – Film

- Martin McCann – Swansong – Story of Occi Byrne (Winner)
  - Colm Meaney – Parked
  - Cillian Murphy – Perrier's Bounty
  - Liam Neeson – Chloe

Actor in a Supporting Role – Film

- Pierce Brosnan – The Ghost Writer (Winner)
  - Colin Farrell – The Way Back
  - Brendan Gleeson – Perrier's Bounty
  - Cillian Murphy – Inception

Actress in a Supporting Role – Film

- Saoirse Ronan – The Way Back (Winner)
  - Kerry Condon – The Runway
  - Marcella Plunkett – Swansong – Story of Occi Byrne
  - Eileen Walsh – Snap

Feature Documentary

- The Pipe (Winner)
  - Burma Soldier
  - Pyjama Girls
  - What We Leave in Our Wake

=== International Categories ===
Best International Film

- The Social Network (Winner)
  - A Prophet
  - Inception
  - Toy Story 3

International Actor

- Jesse Eisenberg- The Social Network (Winner)
  - Russell Crowe – The Next Three Days
  - Leonardo DiCaprio – Inception
  - Tahar Rahim – A Prophet

International Actress

- Annette Bening – The Kids are Alright (Winner)
  - Helena Bonham Carter – The King's Speech
  - Jennifer Lawrence – Winter's Bone
  - Natasha Petrovic – As If I Am Not There

=== Television Drama Categories ===
Single Drama / Drama Serial

- When Harvey Met Bob (Winner)
  - MO
  - Na Cloigne
  - The Silence
  - Wild Decembers

Drama Series / Soap

- The Tudors (Winner)
  - Love/Hate
  - RAW
  - Ros na Rún
  - Single-Handed

Director Television

- Dearbhla Walsh – The Silence (Winner)
  - David Caffrey – Love/Hate
  - Thaddeus O'Sullivan – Single-Handed
  - Robert Quinn – Na Cloigne

Writer Television

- Stuart Carolan- Love/Hate (Winner)
  - Darach Ó Scolaí & Lauren Mackenzie – Na Cloigne
  - Lisa McGee – RAW
  - Hilary Reynolds – Fair City

Actor in a Lead Role – Television

- Domhnall Gleeson – When Harvey Met Bob (Winner)
  - Owen McDonnell – Single-Handed
  - Jonathan Rhys Meyers – The Tudors
  - Robert Sheehan – Love/Hate

Actor in a Supporting Role – Television

- Stephen Rea – Single Handed (Winner)
  - Brian Gleeson – Love/Hate
  - Seán McGinley – Wild Decembers
  - Eamon Morrissy – Fair City

Actress in a Supporting Role – Television

- Ruth McCabe – Single-Handed (Winner)
  - Sarah Bolger – The Tudors
  - Dervla Kirwan – The Silence
  - Ruth Negga – Love/Hate

=== Craft / Technical Categories ===
Costume Design

- Joan Bergin – The Tudors (Winner)
  - Consolata Boyle – Tamara Drewe
  - Joan O'Cleary – Swansong – Story of Occi Byrne
  - Susan Scott – Cup Cake

Director of Photography

- PJ Dillon – The Runway (Winner)
  - Tim Fleming – As If I Am Not There
  - Donal Gilligan – Love/Hate
  - Owen McPolin – The Silence

Editing

- Emer Reynolds – My Brothers (Winner)
  - Dermot Diskin – Love/Hate
  - Guy Montgomery – Parked
  - Nathan Nugent – As If I Am Not There

Make Up & Hair

- Tom McInerney, Dee Corcoran – The Tudors (Winner)
  - Gill Brennan – Swansong – Story of Occi Byrne
  - Caroline McCurdy – Na Cloigne
  - Louise Myler – Parked

Original Score

- Ray Harman – Na Cloigne (Winner)
  - Niall Byrne – Parked
  - Lance Hogan – Lapland Odyssey
  - Gary Lightbody & Jacknife Lee – My Brothers

Production Design

- Ray Ball – The Runway
  - Tamara Conboy – Sensation
  - Tom Conroy – The Tudors
  - Susie Cullen – The Silence

Sound

- Karl Merren, Ken Galvin, Peter Blayney – The Silence
  - Daniel Birch, Robert Flanagan – Circus Fantasticus
  - Robert Flanagan, Michelle Cunniffe, Fiadhnait McCann – Essential Killing
  - Patrick Hanlon, Ken Galvin, Niall Brady – Rewind

=== Television Categories ===
Children's / Youth Programme

- Big City Park (Winner)
  - The Octonauts
  - Primary School Musical
  - Seacht

Current Affairs

- Spotlight: The Iris Robinson Investigation (Winner)
  - Prime Time Investigates – Forgotten Lives
  - The Frontline
  - Tonight with Vincent Browne

Documentary Series

- Freefall: The Night The Banks Failed (Winner)
  - 1916 Seachtar na Cásca
  - Ireland's Greatest
  - The Truth about Travellers

Documentary

- Voices From The Grave (Winner)
  - Children in Charge: Ireland's Young Carers
  - TK Whitaker – Seirbhíseach an Stait
  - Vanished in the Mountains: Ireland's Missing Women

Entertainment Programme

- Your Bad Self (Winner)
  - The Apprentice
  - Feirm Factor
  - The Model Scouts

Factual Programme

- Operation Transformation (Winner)
  - Ireland AM
  - Reeling in the Years
  - The Eagles Return

Sports Programme

- In Sunshine Or in Shadow
  - Graeme McDowell's Major Moment
  - Gualainn le Gualainn
  - World Cup Live

=== Other Categories ===
There was a single award for lead actress; the Irish Film and Television Academy claimed that they had "not received sufficient submissions" to have separate awards.

Actress in a lead role – Film/TV

- Amy Huberman- Rewind (Winner)
  - Ruth Bradley – Love/Hate
  - Orla Brady – Mistresses
  - Sarah Flood – Fair City
  - Charlene McKenna – RAW

Short Film

- Small Change (Winner)
  - Deep End Dance
  - Noreen
  - Pentecos

Rising Star Award

- Domhnall Gleeson
  - Antonia Campbell Hughes
  - Ian Power
  - Juanita Wilson

Special Irish Language Award

- 1916 Seachtar na Cásca
  - An Crisis
  - Na Cloigne
  - Ros na Rún

Animation

- The External World
  - Anam an Amhráin
  - Head Space
  - The Octonauts

=== Outstanding Contribution to Industry ===
- Morgan O'Sullivan
