= Caoilfhionn Dunne =

Irish actress

- Born: 1984 (age 41–42); Dublin, Ireland
- Education: Gaiety School of Acting
- Occupation: Actor
- Years active: 2008-present
- Television: Love/Hate; Industry

Caoilfhionn Dunne (b. 1984) (/ˈkiːlɪn/ KEE-lin or /ˈkwiːlɪn/ KWEE-lin) is an Irish stage, television, and film actress. On stage, she was nominated for the Evening Standard Theatre Awards for Outstanding Newcomer in 2013. In 2014, she was nominated for Best Supporting Actress in a Television Series at the 11th Irish Film & Television Awards. Her film roles include Saint Maud (2019).

== Early and personal life ==
From Dublin, she was born in Finglas. She attended the Gaiety School of Acting.

Dunne is a member of the LGBTQ+ community.

== Career ==
Dunne's first screen role was in Little White Lie, a 2008 romantic comedy for RTÉ Television. Her theatre work included Conor McPherson's The Veil at London's Royal National Theatre. She also appeared in Mike Bartlett's play Wild, Laurence Boswell's Forever Yours Mary Lou, Lyndsey Turner's Fathers and Sons at the Donmar Warehouse as well as Conor McPherson's plays The Nest which he translated from the German writer Franz Xaver Kroetz and The Night Alive, for which she was nominated for the Evening Standard Award for Outstanding Newcomer in 2013.

She played Lizzie from the third series of RTÉ Television drama Love/Hate. In 2014, she was nominated for Best Supporting Actress in a Television Series at the 11th Irish Film & Television Awards.

She appeared in Suzy Storck from the book by Magali Mougel at the Gate Theatre, London in 2017. In 2017, she was nominated for Best Actress at the 14th Irish Film & Television Awards for her role in the film In View.

She appeared in the 2019 horror film Saint Maud. She plays Jackie Walsh in the BBC television series Industry and as Brearn in the historical fantasy series, Britannia. In July 2024, she was cast in a lead role in Lisa McGee series How to Get to Heaven from Belfast. She has a role in Steven Knight historical drama A Thousand Blows (2025).

== Partial filmography ==
Year	Title	Role	Notes
2008	Little White Lie	Charlotte	Television film
2012–2014	Love/Hate	Lizzie	10 episodes
2016	In View	Ruth	Film
2019	Ghosts	Director Petra O'Keefe	1 episode
2019	Chernobyl	Yenina	1 episode
2019	Saint Maud	Nurse	Film
2019	Britannia	Brearn	9 episodes
2020–2022	Industry	Jackie Walsh	15 episodes
2025	A Thousand Blows	Anne Glover	Series Regular
2025	Doctor Who	Shaya Costallion	1 episode; "The Well"
2025	Andor	Lepori	2 episodes
2026	How to Get to Heaven from Belfast	Dara	8 episodes
