= Saltwater (2000 film) =

- Directed by: Conor McPherson
- Written by: Conor McPherson
- Produced by: Robert Walpole
- Starring: Peter McDonald; Brian Cox; Conor Mullen; Laurence Kinlan; Brendan Gleeson; Eva Birthistle
- Cinematography: Oliver Curtis
- Edited by: Emer Reynolds
- Music by: The Plague Monkeys
- Production companies: Alta Films; BBC Films; Bórd Scannán na hÉireann; Radio Telefís Éireann; Treasure Entertainment
- Distributed by: Buena Vista International
- Release date: 29 September 2000
- Running time: 97 minutes
- Country: Ireland
- Language: English

Saltwater is a 2000 Irish drama film written and directed by Conor McPherson. The film stars Peter McDonald, Brian Cox, Conor Mullen, Laurence Kinlan, Brendan Gleeson, and Eva Birthistle. The film was released on 29 September 2000, by Buena Vista International.

== Cast ==
- Peter McDonald as Frank Beneventi
- Brian Cox as George Beneventi
- Conor Mullen as Ray Sullivan
- Laurence Kinlan as Joe Beneventi
- Brendan Gleeson as Simple Simon
- Eva Birthistle as Deborah McCeever
- Valerie Spelman as Carmel Beneventi
- David O'Rourke as Damien Fitzgibbon
- Caroline O'Boyle as Tara
- Gina Moxley as Sgt. Duggan
- Garrett Keogh as Tony Regan
- Michael McElhatton as John Traynor
- Pat Shortt as Mr Fanning
- Carl Duering as Konigsberg
- Olwen Fouéré as Trish Meehan
- Maria McDermottroe as Headmistress
- Alan King as Charlie
- Mark Dunne as Junior
- Billy Roche as Larry
- Anto Nolan as Bouncer One Tony
- Simon Delaney as Bouncer Two Darren
- Deirdre O'Kane as Maria Beneventi
- Lisa Tierney Keogh as Orla
- Hilda Fay as Cloakroom Att.
- Nuala O'Neill as Michelle
- Kevin Hely as Barman Teddy
- Andrew Bennett as Garda
- Sean Flanagan as Lawless
- Simon Jewell as Duignan
- Peter Coonan as Rooney
- Ciaran Delaney as Hennessy
- Michael Coonan as Logan
- Lesley Conroy as Lisa
