= Men at Lunch =

2012 Irish documentary film

- Film poster
- Irish: Lón sa Spéir
- Directed by: Seán Ó Cualáin
- Produced by: Éamonn Ó Cualáin
- Narrated by: Fionnula Flanagan
- Production company: Sónta Films
- Release dates: 13 July 2012 (Galway); 1 February 2013 (general)
- Running time: 58 minutes
- Country: Ireland
- Language: Irish/English

Men at Lunch (Irish: Lón sa Spéir [ˈl̪ˠoːn̪ˠ sˠə ˈsˠpʲeːɾʲ], lit. 'Lunch in the Sky') is a 2012 Irish English/Irish language documentary on the history behind the 1932 Lunch atop a Skyscraper photograph, its Irish connections, and the story of immigration in New York at the turn of the century. It was directed by Seán Ó Cualáin, produced by his brother, Éamonn Ó Cualáin, and narrated by Fionnula Flanagan. It premiered at the Galway Film Fleadh film festival in 2012.

== Accolades ==
- Special Irish Language Award - 10th Irish Film & Television Awards
