= 9th Irish Film & Television Awards =

Annual Irish film and television awards ceremony

- Date: 11 February 2012
- Site: Convention Centre Dublin
- Hosted by: Simon Delaney

Highlights
- Best Film: The Guard
- Best Actor: Michael Fassbender; Shame
- Best Actress: Saoirse Ronan; Hanna
- Most awards: Love/Hate (7)
- Most nominations: Love/Hate (10)

Television coverage
- Channel: RTÉ One
- Ratings: 1,143,000

The 9th Irish Film & Television Awards took place on Saturday 11 February 2012 at the Convention Centre Dublin (CCD), honouring Irish film and television released in 2011.

It was hosted by Irish actor Simon Delaney. The Show was broadcast on RTÉ One Television on the night.

The ceremony, hosted by the Academy on Saturday 11 February reached a record audience of 1.143 Million viewers* on RTÉ One, clocking up the highest number of Irish viewers to watch the Awards show.

Among the winners at the Irish Film & Television Awards was Michael Fassbender, who picked up the Best Actor IFTA for his stark performance in Steve McQueen's drama Shame. Speaking after receiving his IFTA, Michel said he was "humbled" and "honoured" to accept the accolade from the Irish Academy.

The Guard, Ireland's most successful independent Irish feature film, won four film Awards on the night; Best Film, Director, Screenwriter and Supporting Actress Fionnula Flanagan.

Irish Actress Fionnula Flanagan received the IFTA Lifetime Achievement award.

The TV series Love/Hate won seven awards including Best Drama and Best Director.

== Awards ==
=== Film categories ===
Film

The Guard — Ed Guiney, Andrew Lowe, Chris Cark, Flora Fernandez Marengo

- Albert Nobbs — Alan Moloney, Bonnie Curtis, Julie Lynn, Glenn Close
- Charlie Casanova — Terry McMahon
- Stella Days — Jackie Larkin, Leslie McKimm

Director in Film

John Michael McDonagh — The Guard

- Rebecca Daly — The Other Side of Sleep
- Terry McMahon — Charlie Casanova
- Thaddeus O'Sullivan — Stella Days

Script Film

John Michael McDonagh — The Guard

- John Banville, Glenn Close — Albert Nobbs
- Terry McMahon — Charlie Casanova
- Antoine O'Flaherta — Stella Days

Actor in a Lead Role in a Feature Film

Michael Fassbender — Shame

- Brendan Gleeson — The Guard
- Ciarán Hinds — Tinker Tailor Soldier Spy
- Martin Sheen — Stella Days

Actress in a Lead Role in a Feature Film

Saoirse Ronan — Hanna

- Aoife Duffin — Behold the Lamb
- Antonia Campbell Hughes — The Other Side of Sleep
- Marcella Plunkett — Stella Days

Actor in a Supporting Role in a Feature Film

Chris O'Dowd — Bridesmaids

- Liam Cunningham — The Guard
- Brendan Gleeson — Albert Nobbs
- Ciarán Hinds — The Debt

Actress in a Supporting Role in a Feature Film

Fionnula Flanagan — The Guard

- Maria Doyle Kennedy — Albert Nobbs
- Brenda Fricker — Albert Nobbs
- Amy Huberman — Stella Days

George Morrison Feature Documentary Award

Bernadette: Notes on a Political Journey — Lelia Doolan

- 'Knuckle' — Ian Palmer
- Men of Arlington — Enda Hughes
- Off the Beaten Track — Dieter Auner

Special Irish Language Award

Corp + Anam – Paddy Hayes

- Mobs Cheanada — Dathai Keane
- Ray McAnally – M'Athair — Brian Reddin
- Seacht — Colin O'Donnell

Animation

The Boy in the Bubble – Kealan O'Rourke

- 23 Degrees 5 Minutes — Darragh O'Connell
- The Last Train — Alex Sherwood
- Origin — James Stacey

Philips Short Film Award

Foxes – Lorcan Finnegan

- The Boy in the Bubble — Kealan O' Rourke
- Cluck — Michael Lavelle
- Downpour — Claire Dix
- The Shore — Terry George

=== International categories ===
International Film

Tinker Tailor Soldier Spy

- Bridesmaids
- Drive
- Senna

International Actor

Ryan Gosling — Drive

- Don Cheadle — The Guard
- Leonardo DiCaprio — J. Edgar
- Gary Oldman — Tinker Tailor Soldier Spy

International Actress

Glenn Close — Albert Nobbs

- Meryl Streep — The Iron Lady
- Tilda Swinton — We Need to Talk About Kevin
- Kristen Wiig — Bridesmaids

=== Television Drama categories ===
Best Drama – In Association with BAI

Love/Hate — Suzanne McAuley, Steve Mattews

- Corp + Anam — Paddy Hayes
- Game of Thrones — Mark Huffam
- The Borgias — Neil Jordan, James Flynn

Director – Television Drama

David Caffrey — Love/Hate

- Neil Jordan — The Borgias
- Brian Kirk — Game of Thrones
- Daniel O'Hara — Being Human

Writer – Television Drama

Stuart Carolan — Love/Hate

- Neil Jordan — The Borgias
- Ronan Bennett — Hidden
- Daire Mac Con Iomaire — Corp + Anam

Actor in a Lead Role – Television

Aidan Gillen — Love/Hate

- Diarmuid de Faoite — Corp + Anam
- Chris O'Dowd — The Crimson Petal and the White (TV miniseries)
- David Pearse — Trivia

Actress in a Lead Role – Television

Ruth Negga — Shirley

- Maria Doyle Kennedy — Corp + Anam
- Michelle Fairley — Game of Thrones
- Aisling O'Sullivan — Raw

Actor in a Supporting Role – Television

Tom Vaughan-Lawlor — Love/Hate

- Brendan Coyle — Downton Abbey
- Aidan Gillen — Game of Thrones
- Robert Sheehan — Misfits

Actress in a Supporting Role – Television

Denise McCormack — Love/Hate

- Eva Birthistle — Strike Back
- Bronagh Gallagher — The Field of Blood
- Ruth Negga — Misfits

=== Craft/Technical categories (Film/TV Drama) ===
Costume Design

Consolata Boyle — The Iron Lady

- Joan Bergin — Camelot
- Eimer Ní Mhaoldomhnaigh — Neverland
- Lorna Marie Mugan — Treasure Island

Director of Photography

Seamus McGarvey — We Need to Talk About Kevin

- Seamus Deasy — Neverland
- Suzie Lavelle — The Other Side of Sleep
- Robbie Ryan — Wuthering Heights

Editing

Isobel Stephenson — Love/Hate

- Dermot Diskin — Stella Days
- Tony Kearns — Charlie Casanova
- Úna Ní Dhonghaíle — Doctor Who

M.A.C Make-up & Hair

Lorraine Glynn/ Lynn Johnson — Albert Nobbs

- Dee Corcoran/Tom Mc Inerney — Camelot
- Ailbhe Lemass/Lorraine Glynn — Neverland
- Joni Galvin/Eileen Buggy — Stella Days

Original Score

Brian Byrne — Albert Nobbs

- Darragh O'Toole — Ballymun Lullaby
- Stephen McKeon — Legends of Valhalla: Thor
- Ray Harman — Love/Hate

Production Design

Anna Rackard – Stella Days

- Tom Conroy — Camelot
- Stephen Daly — Love/Hate
- John Paul Kelly — The Guard

Sound

Albert Nobbs — Brendan Deasy, Niall Brady, Michelle Cunniffe, Steve Fanagan

- Game of Thrones — Ronan Hill, Sound Post Production Team
- Love/Hate — Brendan Deasy, Mark Henry, Fiadhnait McCann
- The Guard — Robert Flanagan, Michelle Cuniffe, Niall Brady

=== Craft/Technical categories (Television) ===
Director – Television

Gary Keane – The Writing in the Sky

- Liz Gill — A Story with Me in It
- Lynda McQuaid — MasterChef Ireland
- Kieron J. Walsh — The Savage Eye

Director of Photography – Television

Peter Robertson – Waterways

- Richard Kendrick — Two for the Road
- Michael O'Donovan — The Writing in the Sky
- Kieron Skyne — Departure Day

Editing – Television

Ray Roantree – The Ashes of 9/11

- Ailbhe Gaffney — MasterChef Ireland
- Mick Mahon — The Writing in the Sky
- Emer Reynolds — Broken Tail

Sound – Television

The Writing in the Sky – Killian Fitzgerald, Aza Hand

- Horslips – Rotha Mór an tSaoil — Sam Horgan
- MasterChef Ireland — Trevor Cunningham
- Punky — Emma Butt

=== Television categories ===
Children's/Youth Programme

The Importance of Being Whatever – Martina Niland, David Collins

- OMG! Jedward's Dream Factory — Noleen Golding
- Punky — Gerard O'Rourke
- The Amazing World of Gumball — Anne Tweedy, Peter Lewis

Current Affairs/News

Prime Time Investigates: The Home Care Scandal — Adrian Lydon

- Prime Time Investigates: Carry on Regardless — Bill Malone
- The Frontline: The Presidential Debate — Michael Hughes
- State Visit to Ireland of Queen Elizabeth II — John O'Regan

Documentary Series

Waterways — Stephen Rooke

- The Meaning of Life with Gay Byrne — Roger Childs
- Mobs Cheanada — Dathai Keane
- The Tenements — Jane Kelly

Documentary

The Blood of the Travellers — Liam McGrath

- Father Ted: Small, Far Away – The World of Father Ted — Faye Hill
- Ray McAnally — Brian Reddin
- The Irish of 9/11 — Maurice Sweeney

Entertainment Programme

Mrs. Brown's Boys — Brendan O'Carroll, Justin Healy

- Hardy Bucks — Mike Cockayne
- MasterChef Ireland — Larry Bass
- The Savage Eye — Sideline Productions

Factual Programme

The Only Viking in the Village – Anne Heffernan, Bernadine Carraher'

- Secret Millionaire — Ronan O. Muirthile
- Story of Ireland — Mike Connolly
- The Belfast Blitz — Andrea McCartney

Reality Programme

ICA Bootcamp – Independent Pictures

- Celebrity Bainisteoir — Fiona Looney
- Head Chef — Billy McGrath
- The Apprentice — Larry Bass

Sports

Eamon Coughlan – Man on a Mission – Motive Television

- Frank O'Farrell – The Shadow of Busby — Sean Doyle
- Pilgrims – The Irish at Cheltenham — Maurice Sweeney
- Rory's Major Breakthrough — Stephen Watson

RTÉ Guide Best TV Moment of the Year

Shamrock Rovers Europa League Qualifying Goal – Setanta Ireland
