= On the Nose (film) =

2001 film by David Caffrey

- DVD Screenshot
- Directed by: David Caffrey
- Written by: Tony Philpott
- Produced by: Scott Kennedy; Tristan Lynch
- Starring: Dan Aykroyd; Robbie Coltrane
- Cinematography: Paul Sarossy
- Edited by: Roger Mattiussi
- Music by: James Jandrisch
- Distributed by: Highwire Entertainment
- Release date: 21 September 2001
- Running time: 104 minutes
- Countries: Ireland; Canada
- Language: English

On the Nose is a 2001 comedy fantasy film. It was written by Tony Philpott and stars Dan Aykroyd and Robbie Coltrane in a magical comedy where a long dead Australian aboriginal's head is used to predict winners in horse races. Principal photography took place in Dublin.

== Summary ==
Robbie Coltrane plays a rehabilitated gambler who is tested beyond all limits when a head stored in the university turns out to accurately predict race horse winners. Robbie Coltrane finds he must hold off a representative from the University of Australia, who has come to reclaim the head and take it back to Australia, and the mob in order to raise money for his daughter's tuition.

== Cast ==
- Dan Aykroyd as Dr. Barry Davis
- Robbie Coltrane as Delaney
- Brenda Blethyn as Mrs. Delaney
- Tony Briggs as Michael Miller
- Jim Norton as Patrick Cassidy
- Sinead Keenan as Sinead Delaney
- Don Baker as Barclay
- Glynis Barber as Anthea Davis
- Francis Burke as Nana
- Mark Anthony Byrne as Anto (Uncredited)
- Simon Delaney as Grogan
- Peadar Flanagan as Race Commentator
- Una Kavanagh as Receptionist
- Laurence Kinlan as Kiaran Delaney
- Alvaro Lucchesi as Foley
- Eanna MacLiam as Seamus Boyle
- Una Minto as Woman
- Cathy Murphy as Dolores
- Owen O'Gorman as Teller
- Sean O'Shaughnessy as Liam
- Peter O'Sullevan as Grand National commentator
- Myles Purcell as Egert
- June Rodgers as Eileen Casey
- Des Scahill as Race Commentator
- Zara Turner as Carol Lenahan

== Awards ==
The film won the Audience Award in 2002 at the Newport Beach Film Festival.

== See also ==
- List of films about horse racing
