= Love/Hate (TV series) =

Irish crime drama television series

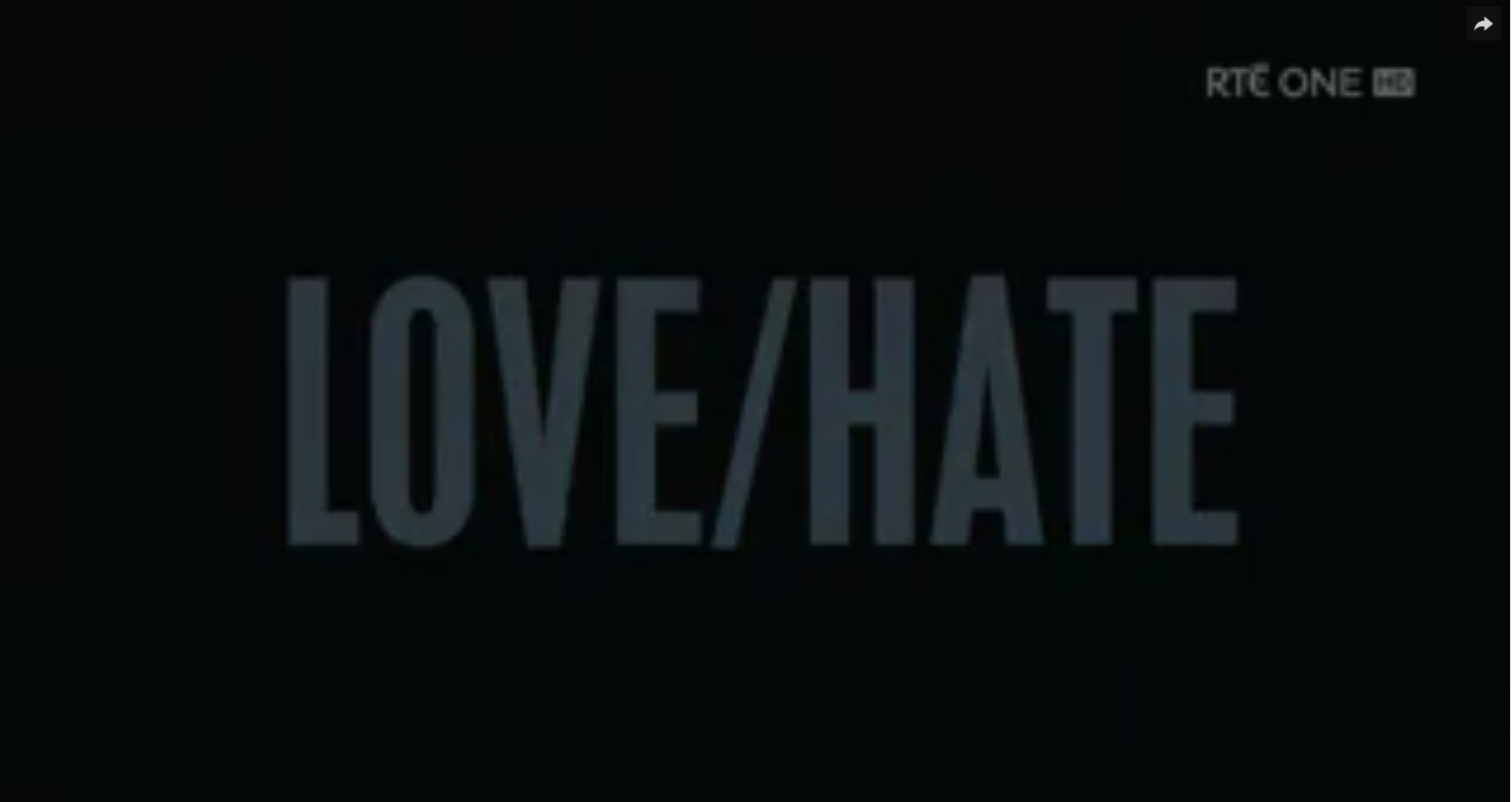
- Genre: Crime drama Serial drama
- Created by: Stuart Carolan
- Starring: Tom Vaughan-Lawlor; Killian Scott; Charlie Murphy; Aoibhinn McGinnity; Peter Coonan; Mark Dunne; Laurence Kinlan; Robert Sheehan; Susan Loughnane; Aidan Gillen; Ruth Bradley; Ruth Negga; Brían F. O'Byrne; Peter Campion; Brian Gleeson
- Music by: Ray Harman
- Country of origin: Ireland
- Original language: English
- No. of seasons: 5
- No. of episodes: 28 (list of episodes)

Production
- Executive producers: Simon Massey; Suzanne McAuley; James Flynn; Jane Gogan
- Production location: Dublin
- Camera setup: Single-camera, RED
- Running time: 60 minutes
- Production company: Octagon Films

Original release
- Network: RTÉ One
- Release: 3 October 2010 – 9 November 2014

Love/Hate is an Irish crime drama television series, commissioned by RTÉ Television and created by Stuart Carolan. Set in Dublin, the show depicts fictional characters in the city's criminal underworld. The show is mostly filmed in Dublin, with some scenes shot in bordering counties. Since its release, it continued to grow in popularity, with series 3 attracting close to one million viewers on several occasions.

The show aired between 2010 and 2014 on RTÉ One and RTÉ Player, spanning five series and twenty-eight episodes. The show was later broadcast on Netflix and dubbed into French and German, and in 2024 the show was released for streaming onto ITVX. In November 2014, RTÉ stated that a sixth series would be made, but the show would be taking a year-long break in 2015. However, in November 2015, RTÉ stated that there were no longer plans to make a sixth series. In 2017, actor John Connors confirmed that production of Love/Hate had ceased and there would be no more seasons aired.

Love/Hate was critically acclaimed, winning nineteen Irish Film & Television Awards, and its twelve-nomination run in 2013 set a national record. The show has become a cult classic in Ireland and is widely regarded as one of the greatest Irish shows ever. In 2015, plans were announced to make an American version of the show, but as of 2024 no such show has been filmed.

== Conception ==
Stuart Carolan had previously written shows for the stage and one episode of RTÉ's Raw in 2008 before Love/Hate. In an interview with The Irish Times, Carolan said that he had the idea for Love/Hate in his head for years. He stated he was influenced by the 1996 murder of crime reporter Veronica Guerin and his mother's experience as an emergency department nurse, treating those who had been shot or stabbed.

== Description ==
The story is set in Dublin's criminal underworld. The first season introduced John Boy, a criminal kingpin, and the four friends Darren, Nidge, Robbie and Tommy as his gang members. The show has also featured Ruth Negga, Ruth Bradley, Killian Scott, and Chris Newman. The story focuses on rivalries within the criminal milieu and the psychological effects of violence on the Darren character. It is directed by David Caffrey and produced by Simon Massey, Suzanne McAuley, and James Flynn.

The fourth season began broadcasting on 6 October 2013. The opening episode of season four attracted 970,600 viewers on RTÉ One.

Each episode cost approximately €600,000 to make.

== Cast ==
During season four, it was revealed that Kieran O'Reilly, who played undercover Garda detective Ciarán Madden, was a real member of the Garda National Drug Unit. Gardaí are not prohibited from acting by the Garda Code, though there was an internal investigation into his appearance on the show.

| Actor | Character | Seasons | | | | | Episode count |
| Actor | Character | 1 | 2 | 3 | 4 | 5 | Episode count |
|---|---|---|---|---|---|---|---|
| Tom Vaughan-Lawlor | Nigel "Nidge" Delaney | Main | Main | Main | Main | Main | 28 |
| Aoibhinn McGinnity | Trish Delaney | Main | Main | Main | Main | Main | 27 |
| Charlie Murphy | Siobhán Delaney | Main | Main | Main | Main | Main | 27 |
| Killian Scott | Thomas "Tommy" Daly | Main | Main | Main | Main | Recurring | 27 |
| Robert Sheehan | Darren Treacy | Main | Main | Main | Guest | | 18 (Note: One appearance in season 4 as a corpse and one in a flashback.) |
| Ruth Bradley | Mary Treacy | Main | Main | | | | 10 |
| Aidan Gillen | John "John Boy" Power | Main | Main | | | | 11 |
| Brian Gleeson | Hugh "Hughie" Power | Main | | | | | 4 |
| Ruth Negga | Rosie Moynihan | Main | Main | | | | 8 |
| Peter Campion | Stephen "Stumpy" Doyle | Main | Main | | | | 6 |
| Chris Newman | Robbie Treacy | Guest | | | | | 1 |
| Laurence Kinlan | Eric "Elmo" Creed | Main | | Main | Main | Main | 19 |
| Peter Coonan | Fran Cooney | | Main | Main | Main | Main | 24 |
| Mark Dunne | Adrian "Ado" Kenny | | Main | Main | Main | Main | 24 |
| Susan Loughnane | Debbie | | Main | Main | Main | | 15 |
| Ian Lloyd Anderson | Dean "Deano" Buckley | | Main | Recurring | Main | Main | 18 |
| Gavin Drea | Luke | | Main | | | | 6 |
| Denise McCormack | Linda Cooney | | Main | | Guest | | 5 (Note: One appearance in season 4 in a flashback.) |
| Jimmy Smallhorne | Christopher "Git" Loughman | | | Guest | | | 1 |
| Jason Barry | Daniel "Dano" Loughman | | | Main | Main | | 9 |
| Seán McGinley | Tony | | | Main | Recurring | | 6 |
| Caoilfhionn Dunne | Lizzie | | | Main | Main | Guest | 10 |
| Mary Murray | Janet Hartigan | | | Recurring | Main | Main | 14 |
| Lynn Rafferty | Nadine | | | Recurring | Main | Main | 13 |
| John Connors | Patrick Ward | | Guest | | Main | Main | 9 (Note: Uncredited appearance in season 2.) |
| Brían F. O'Byrne | D.I. Mick "Cig" Moynihan | | | | Main | Main | 11 |
| Kieran O'Reilly | Detective Ciarán "Heggo" Madden | | | | Main | Main | 11 |
| Aaron Heffernan | Detective Gavin | | | | Main | Guest | 6 |
| Peter O'Meara | Andrew Reddin | | | | Main | | 6 |
| Barry Keoghan | Wayne Cardiff | | | | Main | | 6 |
| Johnny Ward | Pauley Lawless | | | | | Main | 5 |
| Peter Gowen | Pat | Recurring | Recurring | | | | 5 |
| Amy Shiels | Danielle | Guest | | Recurring | | | 7 |
| Dylan Stoeckhardt | Warren Delaney | | Recurring | Recurring | Recurring | Recurring | 15 |
| Ger Carey | Dave | | Recurring | Guest | Recurring | Guest | 9 |
| Mark Butler | Pottsie Kenny | | Recurring | Guest | Recurring | Guest | 7 |
| Patrick Murphy | Karl | | Recurring | Guest | Guest | Recurring | 7 |
| Damien Kearney | Garda Martin Quinn | | Recurring | | Recurring | | 5 |
| Stephen O'Brien | Detective Terry Ryan | | | Recurring | Recurring | Recurring | 14 |
| Paddy Murray | Paddy | | | Recurring | | | 6 |
| Jim Murray | Ray | | | Recurring | | | 5 |
| Siobhan Shanahan | Donna | | | Recurring | | Recurring | 8 |
| Eve Macklin | Georgina Loughman | | | Recurring | | | 5 |
| Stephen Cromwell | Gary Creed | | | Recurring | | | 3 |
| Leroy Harris | Glen "Ginny" O'Donoghoe | | | | Recurring | Guest | 4 |
| Stephen Clinch | Noely Hughes | | | | Recurring | Recurring | 5 (Note: 2 uncredited appearances in season 4.) |
| Paul Brannigan | Scotty | | | | | Recurring | 5 |
| Paudge Behan | Terence "Terence Big Balls" May | | | | | Recurring | 3 |

== Production ==
Commissioned by RTÉ Drama, it is produced by Octagon Films. The producers are Simon Massey, Suzanne McAuley, and James Flynn. Shooting for the first series began on 12 October 2009. The show is written by Stuart Carolan and initially directed by David Caffrey. The director of photography is Donal Gilligan and the show was filmed on the RED camera, a digital cinema camera, now the Arri Alexa. The production designer is Stephen Daly and the costume designer is Aisling Wallace Byrne. The show is edited by Dermot Diskin.

The second series began filming in late March 2011 on location in Dublin.

On 12 December 2011, RTÉ.ie reported that a third series was in development. On 17 January 2012 this was confirmed by RTÉ.

On 18 December 2012, Irish Independent reported that "filming for the fourth series of Love/Hate is expected to get underway early in the New Year". The first episode of the fourth series was broadcast on 6 October 2013. In November 2013, RTÉ released Love/Hate season 4 on DVD.

In September 2014, series 5 began airing on RTÉ One. The show was officially cancelled in 2017 when John Connors confirmed there would be no more episodes produced, despite early reports that the show would return for a sixth series following a year long hiatus. The fifth series was released on DVD the day after the finale episode aired.

In 2015, it was announced that the show would be released onto Netflix and dubbed into French and German.

In 2025, John Connors stated that a new season was due to enter production later in the year, however according to RTÉ there are 'no plans' to return it.

== Broadcasts ==
=== International broadcasts ===
The complete series is available to view in Ireland on the RTÉ Player. In the United Kingdom, seasons one and two aired on Scotland's ITV franchise, STV.

RTÉ International and the programme's producers signed an international broadcasting deal with ITV Studios Global Entertainment. ITV Global will help market and distribute the show internationally.

Also in the United Kingdom season 1 and 2 was purchased by Channel 5, giving the series a UK-wide broadcast. The first season aired on 24 July 2013. Series 2 was shown on UK freeview channel Spike, following a repeat run of the first series. The complete series is available on the subscription service BritBox.

The first three series have also been bought by TV markets in Brazil, Israel and Singapore joining Australia, New Zealand and South Korea.

=== DVD releases ===
| Title | Region 2 | Region 4 |
|---|---|---|
| Love/Hate – Season 1 | 29 October 2010 | 7 March 2012 |
| Love/Hate – Season 2 | 12 December 2011 | —N/a |
| Love/Hate – Season 3 | 17 December 2012 | —N/a |
| Love/Hate – Season 4 | 11 November 2013 | —N/a |
| Love/Hate – Season 5 | 10 November 2014 | —N/a |

== Episodes ==
| Series | Episodes | Originally broadcast | |
| Series | Episodes | Season premiere | Season finale |
|---|---|---|---|
| 1 | 4 | 3 October 2010 | 24 October 2010 |
| 2 | 6 | 6 November 2011 | 11 December 2011 |
| 3 | 6 | 11 November 2012 | 16 December 2012 |
| 4 | 6 | 6 October 2013 | 10 November 2013 |
| 5 | 6 | 5 October 2014 | 9 November 2014 |

== Reception ==
Initial reactions to Love/Hate were mixed; an Irish Times review of the first season described it as "more Westlife than Westies". While Tom Vaughan-Lawlor's portrayal of Nidge was widely praised, particular criticism was levelled at the Dublin accents in the show and the casting of Robert Sheehan as Darren was criticised as he was perceived as being "too pretty" to be cast in a gangster role. Show creator Stuart Carolan hit back at the latter claims, saying it was "hugely patronising" to working-class Dubliners.

As the show continued, it was increasingly well received, and the second series was met with critical acclaim. After the end of the second season, The Irish Times hailed the show as "the best drama RTÉ has produced" and the Irish Independent commented that it would "make [Martin] Scorsese proud", praising the improvement from the "flimsy" first season.

The third season was further well received, with particular praise being given to the pacing, writing and cinematography, as well as Vaughan-Lawlor's portrayal of Nidge. The opening episode saw the show criticised for its graphic portrayal of rape; a large number of complaints were made to RTÉ over the depiction of rape and violence in this episode. The Dublin Rape Crisis Centre reported a large increase in the calls it received in the aftermath of the episode. Following the end of season three, The Guardian praised the show, comparing it to The Wire and The Sopranos, saying "what makes Love/Hate distinctive is the way in which the scripts ... [root] the mobster genre in the trends and tensions of contemporary Irish culture."

The fourth season was not as well received; critics expressed disappointment at the hurried tying up of storylines, pacing of the plot and what was seen as a disappointing final episode. RTÉ received over a hundred complaints over a scene in the opening episode of the season, in which a cat was shot dead.

The fifth season was considered an improvement on the fourth, though reviewers were critical about the storyline and predictable nature of some of the episodes.

Throughout its run, the show was frequently accused of "glamourising" gangland violence; cast member Lynn Rafferty, who played Nadine, rejected these claims due to the frequent deaths of characters involved in the drug trade.

=== Legacy ===
Love/Hate is widely considered to be one of the greatest TV shows Ireland has ever produced; writing for the Irish Times in 2026, Ed Power described the show as a "slick gangland thriller", praising the strength of its cast. Assessment of the show has seen Nidge described as one of the greatest Irish characters in fiction.

=== Viewership ratings ===
| Episode | Date | Time | Viewer Rank (#) | Viewers Demographic (15+) |
|---|---|---|---|---|
| 1 | 3 October 2010 | 21:30 | #4 | 400,000 |
| 2 | 10 October 2010 | 21:30 | #9 | 405,000 |
| 3 | 17 October 2010 | 21:30 | #8 | 434,000 |
| 4 | 24 October 2010 | 21:30 | #24 | 383,000 |

The second series of Love/Hate was the most watched TV show in Ireland in 2011.

970,600 viewers tuned in to watch the series four opener on 6 October 2013. while the Season finale on 10 November 2013 attracted over one million viewers.

The fifth series opened with over 976,400 viewers tuning in on 5 October 2014.

=== Awards and nominations ===
Each series of Love/Hate has been successful in garnering recognition and awards. The first series received the most nominations at the 8th Irish Film & Television Awards (IFTAs) in 2011, with Stuart Carolan winning Best Writer (Television). The series also won "Best TV Show" in the Listeners' End of Year Poll on The Ian Dempsey Breakfast Show in 2011.

The second series received as many nominations at the 9th IFTAs the following year. It won seven awards including Best Drama, Best Director (David Caffrey), and Best Writer (Stuart Carolan). Other major awards went to Aidan Gillen (Actor in a Lead Role – Television), Tom Vaughan-Lawlor (Actor in a Supporting Role – Television), and Denise McCormack (Actress in a Supporting Role – Television).

It was once again a big winner at the 10th IFTAs in 2013 when the third series received twelve nominations for eleven categories, at the time an IFTA record. It took home six awards including Best Drama, Best Director (David Caffrey), and Best Writer (Stuart Carolan). Tom Vaughan-Lawlor won his second successive acting award for his portrayal of gang leader Nigel "Nidge" Delaney. Charlie Murphy and Susan Loughnane won Best Actress (Television) and Best Supporting Actress (Television), respectively.

The fourth series received eight nominations at the 11th IFTAs in 2014, meaning that the franchise had garnered the most nominations at the awards ceremony for the fourth consecutive year. It won awards for Best Writer (Stuart Carolan) and Actor in a Supporting Role Television (Peter Coonan).

The fifth series was nominated for seven awards at the 12th IFTAs in 2015. It won Best Drama for the third time and Stuart Carolan took home Best Writer for the fifth consecutive year. Charlie Murphy won her second award for Best Actress in a Leading Role (Television Drama) for her portrayal of Siobhán Delaney.

==== IFTA Film & Drama Awards ====
| Year | Category | Nominee(s) | Episode | Result |
|---|---|---|---|---|
| 2011 | Drama Series/Soap | Love/Hate (Suzanne McAuley) | Season 1 | Nominated |
| 2011 | Director – Television | David Caffrey | Season 1 | Nominated |
| 2011 | Writer – Television | Stuart Carolan | Season 1 | Won |
| 2011 | Actor in a Lead Role – Television | Robert Sheehan | Season 1 | Nominated |
| 2011 | Actress in a Lead Role – Film/Television | Ruth Bradley | Season 1 | Nominated |
| 2011 | Actor in a Supporting Role – Television | Brian Gleeson | Season 1 | Nominated |
| 2011 | Actress in a Supporting Role – Television | Ruth Negga | Season 1 | Nominated |
| 2011 | Director of Photography | Donal Gilligan | Season 1 | Nominated |
| 2011 | Editing | Dermot Diskin | Season 1 | Nominated |
| 2012 | Best Drama | Love/Hate (Suzanne McAuley & Steve Mattews) | Season 2 | Won |
| 2012 | Director – Television Drama | David Caffrey | Season 2, episodes 1–3 | Won |
| 2012 | Writer – Television Drama | Stuart Carolan | Season 2 | Won |
| 2012 | Actor in a Lead Role – Television | Aidan Gillen | Season 2 | Won |
| 2012 | Actor in a Supporting Role – Television | Tom Vaughan-Lawlor | Season 2 | Won |
| 2012 | Actress in a Supporting Role – Television | Denise McCormack | Season 2 | Won |
| 2012 | Editing – Film/Television Drama | Isobel Stephenson | Season 2 | Won |
| 2012 | Original Score – Film/Television Drama | Ray Harman | Season 2 | Nominated |
| 2012 | Production Design – Film/Television Drama | Stephen Daly | Season 2 | Nominated |
| 2012 | Sound – Film/Television Drama | Brendan Deasy, Mark Henry, Fiadhnait McCann | Season 2 | Nominated |
| 2013 | Best Drama | Love/Hate (Suzanne McAuley & Steve Mattews) | Season 3 | Won |
| 2013 | Director – Television Drama | David Caffrey | Season 3 | Won |
| 2013 | Writer – Television Drama | Stuart Carolan | Season 3 | Won |
| 2013 | Actor – Television | Tom Vaughan-Lawlor | Season 3 | Won |
| 2013 | Actor – Television | Robert Sheehan | Season 3 | Nominated |
| 2013 | Actress – Television | Charlie Murphy | Season 3 | Won |
| 2013 | Supporting Actor – Television | Peter Coonan | Season 3 | Nominated |
| 2013 | Supporting Actress – Television | Susan Loughnane | Season 3 | Won |
| 2013 | Editing – Film/Drama | Dermot Diskin | Season 3 | Nominated |
| 2013 | Production Design | Stephen Daly | Season 3 | Nominated |
| 2013 | Original Score | Ray Harman | Season 3 | Nominated |
| 2014 | Best Drama | Love/Hate | Season 4 | Nominated |
| 2014 | Writer – Television Drama | Stuart Carolan | Season 4 | Won |
| 2014 | Director – Television Drama | David Caffrey | Season 4 | Nominated |
| 2014 | Best Actor – Television | Tom Vaughan-Lawlor | Season 4 | Nominated |
| 2014 | Best Actress – Television | Charlie Murphy | Season 4 | Nominated |
| 2014 | Best Actress – Television | Mary Murray | Season 4 | Nominated |
| 2014 | Supporting Actor – Television | Peter Coonan | Season 4 | Won |
| 2014 | Supporting Actress – Television | Caoilfhionn Dunne | Season 4 | Nominated |
| 2015 | Best Drama – Television | Love/Hate | Season 5 | Won |
| 2015 | Director – Television Drama | David Caffrey | Season 5 | Nominated |
| 2015 | Script – Television Drama | Stuart Carolan | Season 5 | Won |
| 2015 | Actor in a Lead Role – Television Drama | Tom Vaughan-Lawlor | Season 5 | Nominated |
| 2015 | Actress in a Lead Role – Television Drama | Charlie Murphy | Season 5 | Won |
| 2015 | Actor in a Supporting Role – Television Drama | John Connors | Season 5 | Nominated |
| 2015 | Actress in a Supporting Role – Television | Mary Murray | Season 5 | Nominated |
