= Tom Vaughan-Lawlor =

Irish actor (born 1977)

- Born: 4 November 1977 (age 48); Dundrum, County Dublin, Ireland
- Occupation: Actor
- Years active: 2004–present
- Spouse: Claire Cox
- Children: 2

Tom Vaughan-Lawlor (born 4 November 1977) is an Irish actor. He is best known in Ireland for his roles as Nigel 'Nidge' Delaney in the RTÉ One series Love/Hate (2010–2014), and is known internationally for his role as Ebony Maw in Avengers: Infinity War and its sequel Avengers: Endgame.

== Early life and education ==
Vaughan-Lawlor was born in Dundrum, County Dublin, Ireland. His father, also named Tom, was an actor, and played a leading role in Love/Hate as the main character He attended De La Salle College, Churchtown, a Roman Catholic day secondary school for boys, now co-educational since 2023, in Dublin 14. He graduated from Trinity College, Dublin, with a degree in Drama Studies and continued his studies at the Royal Academy of Dramatic Art in London, England. He was the first ever Irish actor to receive the Laurence Olivier Bursary, an award of £7,500 for the actor in the United Kingdom judged to have the greatest potential.

== Career ==
After leaving the RADA Vaughan-Lawlor starred in many plays including The Quare Fellow directed by Kathy Burke, This Lime Tree Bower, for the Young Vic, and as Christy Mahon in The Playboy of the Western World for the Abbey Theatre which toured North America. Also at the Abbey he played Len in Edward Bond's Saved, Solyony in David Leveaux's production of Three Sisters and as Arturo Ui in Bertolt Brecht's The Resistible Rise of Arturo Ui. In 2008 he played Lyngsrand in The Lady from the Sea by Henrik Ibsen directed by Lucy Bailey. At the National Theatre London he played Yolland in Sean Holmes' production of Brian Friel's Translations in 2005.

In 2008, Vaughan-Lawlor played the Dauphin in Henry V at the Royal Exchange Manchester for which he received an Ian Charleson Award commendation. For his performance in The Resistible Rise of Arturo Ui he won the 2009 Irish Times Best Actor Theatre Award. He won the award again in 2014 for Howie the Rookie.

He also had small roles in The Tiger's Tail, which starred fellow Irish actor Brendan Gleeson and Becoming Jane which starred Anne Hathaway and James McAvoy.

From 2010 to 2014, he began playing the lead role of Nigel "Nidge" Delaney in the critically acclaimed Irish television crime drama Love/Hate. For his portrayal of Nidge he has won the Best Actor in a Supporting Role for Television award at the 2012 IFTA Awards, and the Best Actor for Television award at the 2013 IFTA Awards. On playing the role of Nidge he said "One of the joys of playing the part is he's a different man in all four series, he's always changing and he's incredibly difficult to pinpoint, people are drawn to him because of his humour, the moments he has with his children and the moments he has with his own conscience."

During Love/Hate he continued working on stage in production such as the 2010 West End production of All My Sons directed by Howard Davies. The next year he played Jerry Devine in Davies's production of Juno and the Paycock. In 2013 Vaughan-Lawlor played both the Howie Lee and the Rookie Lee in Mark O'Rowe's Howie the Rookie. Originally written for two actors, O'Rowe re-imagined the play for one actor to play both parts, and directed the production himself for Landmark Productions. The production opened in Dublin, then toured to Cork, Galway, and the Edinburgh Festival. In 2014 the production was invited to the Barbican Centre London where it played in The Pit for 2 weeks, and then toured to BAM in New York.

In 2013, he appeared in the role of Byrne in fifth episode of the BBC2 crime drama Peaky Blinders. In October 2013, he began filming in Dublin on a three-part political drama Charlie which is based on the life of the late Taoiseach Charles Haughey. He played political spin doctor P. J. Mara in the drama.

Vaughan-Lawlor played McCabe in Jim Sheridan's movie The Secret Scripture with Rooney Mara and Jack Reynor which filmed in early 2015, and appeared in the 2016 film The Infiltrator with Bryan Cranston and Diane Kruger, directed by Brad Furman.

He appeared in the three-part drama Trial of the Century, where he played Patrick Pearse. In July 2016 Vaughan-Lawlor played Michaelis in the BBC's 3-part television adaptation of Joseph Conrad's 1907 novel The Secret Agent.

In 2023, Vaughan-Lawlor appeared in the National Theatre revival of Brian Friel's memory play Dancing at Lughnasa, playing Michael, the narrator around whose memories the plot rotates. He plays Plummer in the HBO series A Knight of the Seven Kingdoms (2026).

== Personal life ==
Vaughan-Lawlor currently lives in Whitstable, Kent with his wife Claire Cox, who is an actress, and their son, who appeared as Nidge and Trish's second child John in the crime drama.

== Filmography ==
=== Film ===
Year	Title	Role	Notes	Ref.
2006	The Tiger's Tail	Larry Cooney		
2007	Becoming Jane	Robert Fowle		
2011	Foxes	James	Short film	
2016	The Infiltrator	Steve Cook		
2016	The Secret Scripture	McCabe		
2017	Daphne	Joe		
2017	Maze	Larry Marley		
2017	The Cured	Conor		
2018	Citizen Lane	Hugh Lane	Documentary	
2018	Avengers: Infinity War	Ebony Maw	Motion capture	
2019	Avengers: Endgame	Ebony Maw	Motion capture	
2019	Rialto	Colm		
2020	The Bright Side	Andy		
2022	The Nan Movie	Mick		
2022	Weekend Dad	Paul	Short film	
2023	Baltimore	Dominic		
2023	Dead Shot	Keenan		
2023	The Book of Clarence	Antoninus		
2024	The Beautiful Game	Kevin		

=== Television ===
Year	Title	Role	Notes	Ref.
2010–2014	Love/Hate	Nigel 'Nidge' Delaney	28 episodes	
2013	Peaky Blinders	Malacki Byrne	Episode #1.5	
2015	Charlie	P. J. Mara	3 episodes	
2016	Trial of the Century	Padraig Pearse	3 episodes	
2016	The Secret Agent	Michaelis	3 episodes	
2019	Dublin Murders	Frank Mackey	8 episodes	
2021	Frank of Ireland	Peter-Brian	5 episodes	
2021; 2024	What If...?	Ebony Maw (voice)	3 episodes	
2021	Danny Boy	Patrick	Television film	
2022	The Ipcress File	General Cathcart	6 episodes	
2024	Say Nothing	Older Brendan Hughes	8 episodes	
2024–2025	The Agency	Ben	8 episodes	
2026	A Knight of the Seven Kingdoms	Plummer	3 episodes	
2026	These Sacred Vows	Father Vincent	6 episodes	

== Theatre ==
Year	Title	Role	Director	Playwright	Theatre	Ref.
2023	Dancing at Lughnasa	Michael	Josie Rourke	Brian Friel	National Theatre, London	
