= Stuart Carolan =

Irish screenwriter, producer, and playwright

Stuart Carolan (Irish: Stuart Ó Cearbhalláin) is an Irish screenwriter, producer, and playwright. He is best known for creating, executive producing, and writing the crime drama Love/Hate.

== Career ==
=== Theater ===
His 2004 play Defender of the Faith was produced at the Abbey Theatre and won the George Devine award for Best New Play in the UK & Ireland.

His subsequent play The Empress of India was a commission from the Druid Theatre Company and directed by Tony award winner Garry Hynes.

In 2007 Carolan served as Writer-in-Association at Dublin's Abbey Theatre

=== Television ===
Carolan created, executive produced, and wrote the crime drama Love/Hate. The series ran from 2010 to 2015 on RTÉ One and depicted the world of Dublin's gangs and their families. Carolan wrote all 28 episodes of Love/Hate during its entire run, and won the IFTA award for Best Television Screenplay for five consecutive years. The series went on to set Irish television records and became the most-watched Irish drama in history.

In 2018 Carolan executive produced and co-wrote Taken Down for RTÉ, Freemantle, and Arte, a crime series that explored the modern refugee crisis.

In 2020 Carolan was showrunner and executive producer of The Alienist: Angel of Darkness for TNT, Paramount Television, and Anonymous Content. The historical drama series follows up the 2018 limited series The Alienist. In 2024, Carolan wrote episodes of Guy Ritchie's The Gentlemen.

== Filmography ==
Year	Title	Notes	Broadcaster
2003	The Dunphy Show	Producer	TV3
2008	Little White Lie	Writer, TV Movie	RTÉ
2008	Raw	Writer, 1 Episode	RTÉ
2010–2015:	Love/Hate	Creator	RTÉ One
2018	Taken Down	(co-written by)	
2020	The Alienist: Angel of Darkness	Showrunner, writer	TNT
2024	The Gentlemen	Writer, Episodes 5 & 6	Netflix

== Awards ==
- 2005 George Devine Award
- 2009: IFTA award nomination, "Best Script for Television" for Little White Lie
- 2011: IFTA award Won, "Best Writer: Television Drama" for Love/Hate series 1
- 2012: IFTA award Won, "Best Writer: Television Drama" for Love/Hate series 2
- 2013: IFTA award Won, "Best Script Drama" for Love/Hate series 3
- 2014: IFTA award Won, "Best Script Drama" for Love/Hate series 4
- 2015: IFTA award Won, "Best Script Drama" for Love/Hate series 5
