= David Caffrey =

Irish film director

- Born: 1969 (age 56–57); Greystones, County Wicklow, Ireland
- Occupations: Film director, writer, actor, film producer

David Caffrey is an Irish film director.

Caffrey won the Fantasporto Critics' Award in 1998 for the satirical black comedy Divorcing Jack and the Newport Beach Film Festival Audience Award for Best Feature in 2001 for the fantasy comedy On the Nose.

== Filmography ==
Short film

Year	Title	Director	Writer	Producer
1994	The Connivers	Yes	Yes	Yes
1997	Bolt	Yes	Yes	No

Feature film

- Divorcing Jack (1998)
- On the Nose (2001)
- Grand Theft Parsons (2003) (Also writer and actor)

Miniseries

- Aristocrats (1999)
- Fallout (2006)
- Prime Suspect 1973 (2017)

TV series

Year	Title	Notes
2004–2005	Monarch of the Glen	6 episodes
2004	Life Begins	3 episodes
2007	Wild at Heart	2 episodes
2007	The Commander	2 episodes
2008–2010	Raw	4 episodes
2010–2014	Love/Hate	25 episodes
2012	Line of Duty	3 episodes
2016	Stan Lee's Lucky Man	4 episodes
2017	Peaky Blinders	Series 4
2018	Taken Down	
2020	The Alienist	5 episodes
2024	The Gentlemen	2 episodes
