= Fantastic Films (company) =

Irish film production company

Fantastic Films Ltd
- Company type: Production company
- Industry: Film production
- Founded: 2000
- Headquarters: Dublin, Ireland
- Key people: John McDonnell; Brendan McCarthy
- Website: Website

Fantastic Films is an Irish film production company based in Dublin, Ireland It is run by producers John McDonnell & Brendan McCarthy.

== Filmography ==
- Woken (producer, 2024)
- Vivarium (producer, 2019)
- The Last Days on Mars (co-producer, 2012)
- The Summit (executive producer, 2012)
- Stitches (producer, 2012)
- Ek Tha Tiger (executive producer, 2012)
- Wake Wood (producer, 2011)
- Songs For Amy (executive producer, 2011)
- Outcast (producer, 2010)
- Pelican Blood (producer, 2009)
- Zonad (producer, 2008)
- 48 Angels (producer, 2007)
- Tiger's Tail (co-producer, 2006)
- Wilderness (film) (producer, 2005)
- Timbuktu (producer, 2004)
- Song for a Raggy Boy (producer, 2003)
