= John McDonnell (producer) =

Irish film producer

- Occupation: Film producer
- Known for: Wake Wood
- Website: http://www.fantasticfilms.ie/

John McDonnell is a film producer based in Dublin, Ireland. Together with Brendan McCarthy, McDonnell runs the Oscar-winning production company Fantastic Films (Ireland)

McDonnell is one of Ireland most experienced producers. In 2000, he founded Fantastic Films (Ireland) and since the company's inception McDonnell has produced and collaborated on a diverse range of film projects, receiving over 60 international awards, including an Oscar™ in 2006 for Martin McDonagh short film, Six Shooter (film).

Recent films include The Last Days on Mars (2013), the debut feature film from Oscar-nominated Irish director Ruairí Robinson, selected for Directors' Fortnight at the 2013 Cannes Film Festival; the 2012 award-winning comedy-horror Stitches, directed by Conor McMahon and starring Ross Noble and Tommy Knight, the 2012 Bollywood hit Ek Tha Tiger, directed by Kabir Khan (director) and starring Salman Khan and Katrina Kaif, the 2011 critically acclaimed Hammer Horror Wake Wood, directed by David Keating and starring Timothy Spall, Aidan Gillen and Eva Birthistle and Outcast directed by Colm McCarthy (director) and starring James Nesbitt, Kate Dickie and fellow Scottish actress Hannah Stanbridge, who received a Scottish BAFTA for her role in the film.

McDonnell recently executive produced the Sundance Film Festival awarding-winning documentary THE SUMMIT, written by Mark Monroe and directed by Nick Ryan and beActive Media's BEAT GIRL a transmedia series, available on several platforms, including TV, the web, smart phone app, a novel and now a feature film.

Nominated as Irish “Producer on the Move” in Cannes 2006., McDonnell is an active participant in the ACE Producers Network, a founding member of the Irish Film and Television Academy, a regular juror for the Irish Film and Television Awards and a recent participant on the prestigious producer course Inside Pictures.

In 2008, McDonnell received his Hons MA in Screenwriting from Dún Laoghaire Institute of Art, Design and Technology and regularly designs courses for Screen Training Ireland. He has also lectured in Film at Trinity College, Dublin and DLIADT, Dublin.

== Filmography ==
=== Producer ===
- Woken (producer, 2024)
- Vivarium (producer, 2019)
- The Last Days on Mars (co-producer, 2013)
- The Summit (executive producer, 2013)
- Stitches (producer, 2012)
- Ek Tha Tiger (executive producer, 2012)
- Wake Wood (producer, 2011)
- Songs For Amy (executive producer, 2011)
- Outcast (producer, 2010)
- Pelican Blood (producer, 2009)
- Zonad (producer, 2008)
- 48 Angels (producer, 2007)
- Tiger's Tail (co-producer, 2006)
- Wilderness (producer, 2005)
- Timbuktu (producer, 2004)
- Song for a Raggy Boy (producer, 2003)
