= Sea Fever =

2019 Irish feature film directed by Neasa Hardiman

- Promotional poster
- Directed by: Neasa Hardiman
- Written by: Neasa Hardiman
- Produced by: John McDonnell; Brendan McCarthy
- Starring: Hermione Corfield; Dougray Scott; Connie Nielsen
- Cinematography: Ruairí O'Brien
- Edited by: Barry Moen; Julian Ulrichs
- Music by: Christoffer Franzén
- Production companies: Fantastic Films; Bright Moving Pictures; Frakas Productions; Makar Productions; Film i Väst; VOO; BeTV
- Distributed by: Signature Entertainment (United Kingdom); Wildcard Distribution (Ireland)
- Release dates: 5 September 2019 (TIFF); 24 April 2020 (United Kingdom and Ireland)
- Running time: 95 minutes
- Countries: Ireland; Sweden; Belgium; United Kingdom
- Language: English
- Budget: €2.5 million
- Box office: $387,740

Sea Fever is a 2019 science fiction horror thriller film written and directed by Neasa Hardiman, starring Hermione Corfield, Dougray Scott and Connie Nielsen. The film follows the crew of a marooned fishing trawler, who find themselves threatened by a parasitic infection.

The film premiered at the Toronto International Film Festival on 5 September 2019. It was released on video on demand (VOD) in the United States on 10 April 2020 and in the United Kingdom and Ireland on 24 April 2020. It has received generally positive reviews, with several critics comparing the film's plot to the COVID-19 pandemic.

== Plot ==
Siobhan, a PhD student studying deep sea faunal behavioral patterns, purchases a place on the fishing trawler the Niamh Cinn Óir, crewed by a complement of six: Captain Freya and her husband/skipper Gerard, who are grieving for their daughter Niamh, ship engineer Omid, Johnny, Ciara, and Sudi. As they set off, the Irish Coast Guard alerts them that their planned destination, which is rich with fish, is in an exclusion zone. Unbeknownst to the others and despite Freya's orders, Gerard takes them into the zone anyway, as he needs a large haul of fish on this outing to keep the ship.

In the exclusion zone, the boat runs into an unknown, shoal-like object and stops. Omid discovers strange breaches in the hull that exude a blue-green slime. Gerard thinks they are barnacles. As Siobhan has diving gear on board for her research, Gerard sends her armed with a knife to cut the boat free. Underwater, she sees the things stuck to the boat are the tentacles of an enormous bio-luminescent organism below. Hearing this, Gerard thinks it may be a newly discovered form of giant squid. The crew attempt to capture it with the net, but the creature is too heavy. While releasing the net, Johnny's sleeve is caught in the machinery. Although freed, his hand is sliced by the rope, which is contaminated by slime.

Siobhan sees another ship on the horizon. She, Gerard, and Johnny row to it, seeking help. On board, they find the bodies of the crew in the cabin, most of whom appear to have committed suicide and with one man appearing to have had his eyes removed. Gerard says they must have succumbed to "sea fever" and orders Siobhan and Johnny not to tell the others. After rowing back, they discover the creature has released the boat. They lower the nets and bring up a large catch of fish, lifting the crew's spirits. Siobhan and Johnny flirt and discover they are interested in each other. Johnny develops a fever, which Siobhan suspects is caused by an infection, but he refuses to let his hand be checked.

While the group celebrates that night, Johnny declares he is going for a swim and is stopped by Ciara and Siobhan. Seeing him rub his eyes, Siobhan checks Johnny's eyes with a flashlight and sees something moving inside. As he washes his face, Johnny goes blind. His eyeballs burst, releasing tiny organisms that slither down the drain, entering the ship's water system. He dies. Omid realizes Sudi is in the shower and tries to stop him. Thinking Omid is joking, Sudi does not turn off the water until the waterborne creatures bite him. Gerard, Siobhan, and Omid check the water filtration system and find it has been contaminated by the creatures, which have eaten through all the filters. Siobhan realizes the creatures are the larvae of the enormous sea creature, whose eggs fill the slime. Gerard steers the ship toward shore.

Siobhan experiments on a slime sample and fails to kill the larvae with UV light. She then electrifies the trawler with Omid's help, using the arc welder. This apparently sterilizes the water supply. She insists they all must self-quarantine on board for at least 36 hours, the time it took Johnny's infection to develop. She argues if any of them are infected, they risk infecting others. The others disagree, arguing Sudi needs medical attention and that they should be hospitalized if infected. Sudi dies from the infection. Siobhan disables the boat by entangling the propeller.

Everyone checks each other's eyes for parasites. Siobhan, Omid, Freya, and Ciara appear to be clear, but Freya sees parasites in Gerard's eyes. The couple privately shares a heartfelt goodbye before Gerard kills himself. Siobhan suspects Ciara is infected and climbs up the ladder to alert the others. When Ciara tries to stop her, Siobhan knocks her off the ladder. Ciara dies and a larva emerges from one of her eyes, revealing she was in fact infected. Omid stomps on the larva when it hits the floor, killing it.

Freya leaves alone by rowingboat in spite of Omid and Siobhan's protests. Siobhan and Omid check the water tank again and discover the sole remaining larva has grown larger and eaten through the hull to return to the ocean. As the boat begins to sink, Siobhan and Omid use white spirit to set the deck on fire. Siobhan boards an inflatable raft. Omid, who cannot swim, falls into the water and is pulled down by tentacles. Siobhan rescues him, but cuts her wrist on a tentacle. Knowing she is infected, she swims down toward the bioluminescent creature. Alone on the raft, Omid watches as help approaches.

== Cast ==
- Hermione Corfield as Siobhán
- Connie Nielsen as Freya
- Dougray Scott as Gerard
- Olwen Fouéré as Ciara
- Jack Hickey as Johnny
- Ardalan Esmaili as Omid
- Elie Bouakaze as Sudi

== Production ==
Actress Toni Collette was originally chosen for the role of Freya. However, scheduling issues meant she became unavailable, and she was replaced by Connie Nielsen.

== Release ==
Sea Fever had its world premiere at the Toronto International Film Festival on 5 September 2019.

On 9 April 2020, the film was made available for viewing via an online live stream hosted by distributor Gunpowder & Sky's label Dust. The film was intended to receive a theatrical release on 10 April 2020, but instead was released on video on demand (VOD) on that date in the United States. It was released on VOD in the United Kingdom and Ireland on 24 April 2020 by Signature Entertainment and Wildcard Distribution, respectively.

== Reception ==
Sea Fever has received generally positive reviews, with several critics drawing comparisons between the film's plot and the COVID-19 pandemic. On the review aggregator website Rotten Tomatoes, the film has an approval rating of 87% based on 108 reviews, with an average rating of 6.8/10. The site's critical consensus reads: "If Sea Fever never quite heats up as much as it could, it remains an engrossing, well-acted sci-fi thriller with effective horror elements." On Metacritic, the film has a weighted average score of 60 out of 100, based on 21 critics, indicating "mixed or average reviews".

David Fear of Rolling Stone gave the film three-and-a-half out of five stars, writing that, "amid the claustrophobic compositions and shadowy hallways and tick-tick-tick of inevitable sickness, Sea Fever goes from being a monster movie to an eerily timed example of pandemic horror." Noel Murray of the Los Angeles Times noted that, when the film premiered at TIFF, "many viewers read [it] as a metaphor for climate change [...] Nowadays, the lessons in this imaginative and gripping film seem to have multiple applications." Benjamin Lee of The Guardian awarded the film three out of five stars, calling it "a low-budget effort with high ambitions, something that's hard not to admire". Katie Rife of The A.V. Club gave Sea Fever a grade of "B", writing that, "while the film puts its influences way out front, its impressive execution makes it well worth the 89 minutes."

A. A. Dowd of The A.V. Club gave the film a "B−", writing that "Sea Fever tackles [its premise] with almost too much restraint [...] All the same, there's no denying that the movie eventually reaches a confrontation of disturbing relevance." Devika Girish of The New York Times wrote that the film "seems unsure about its own shape, switching indecisively between creature feature, epidemic thriller and environmental drama without articulating any meaty ideas." Tomris Laffly of RogerEbert.com gave the film two out of four stars, concluding: "You'll leave Hardiman's deck wondering why you aren't more rattled, or even seasick, while hoping for another genre flick from the clearly skilled director soon. Perhaps one that anchors into a deeper story this time."
