= Brendan McCarthy (producer) =

Irish film producer and screenwriter

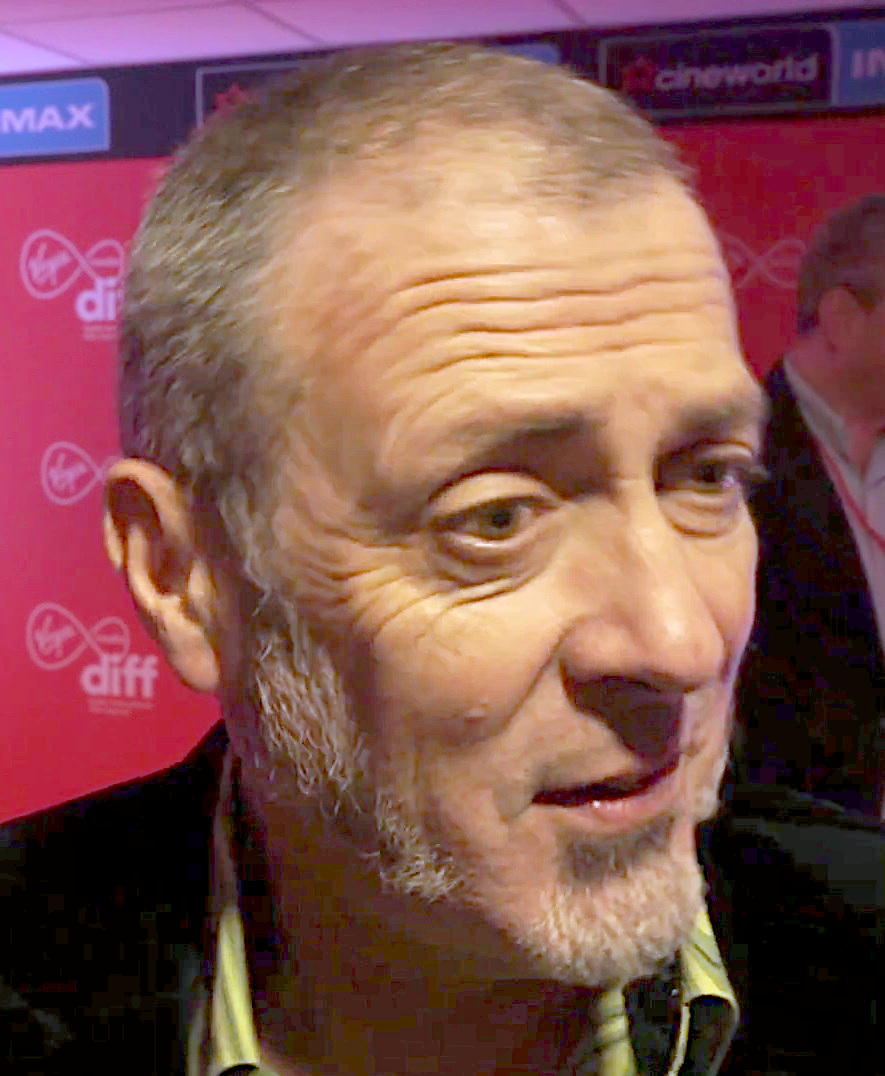
- McCarthy at JDIFF 2020
- Occupations: Film producer; Screenwriter
- Known for: Wake Wood
- Website: http://www.fantasticfilms.ie/

Brendan McCarthy is an Irish film producer and screenwriter based in Dublin, Ireland. Together with John McDonnell, McCarthy runs the Oscar-winning production company Fantastic Films (Ireland).

== Early life ==
Brendan McCarthy is a Film Adviser to Arts Council of Ireland, where he consults on both policy and project related issues. From 2001 to 2012 McCarthy acted as the Irish delegate to Eurimages. Eurimages is the European co-production fund based at the Council of Europe. He was active in the creation of policy and project selection during this time.

From 2001 to 2005, McCarthy was the Head of Production and Development at the Irish Film Board, where he was instrumental in helping to create new production finance initiatives, including the Low Budget Initiative and the Micro Budget Digital/Development Fund. He was also actively involved in the selection and funding of projects for both development and production.

Brendan McCarthy is a graduate of EAVE, ACE, Media Film School and Scale Strategics Marketing. In addition to this McCarthy has also acted as a board member of Media Desk Ireland and previously ran his own production company, Blue Light Productions.

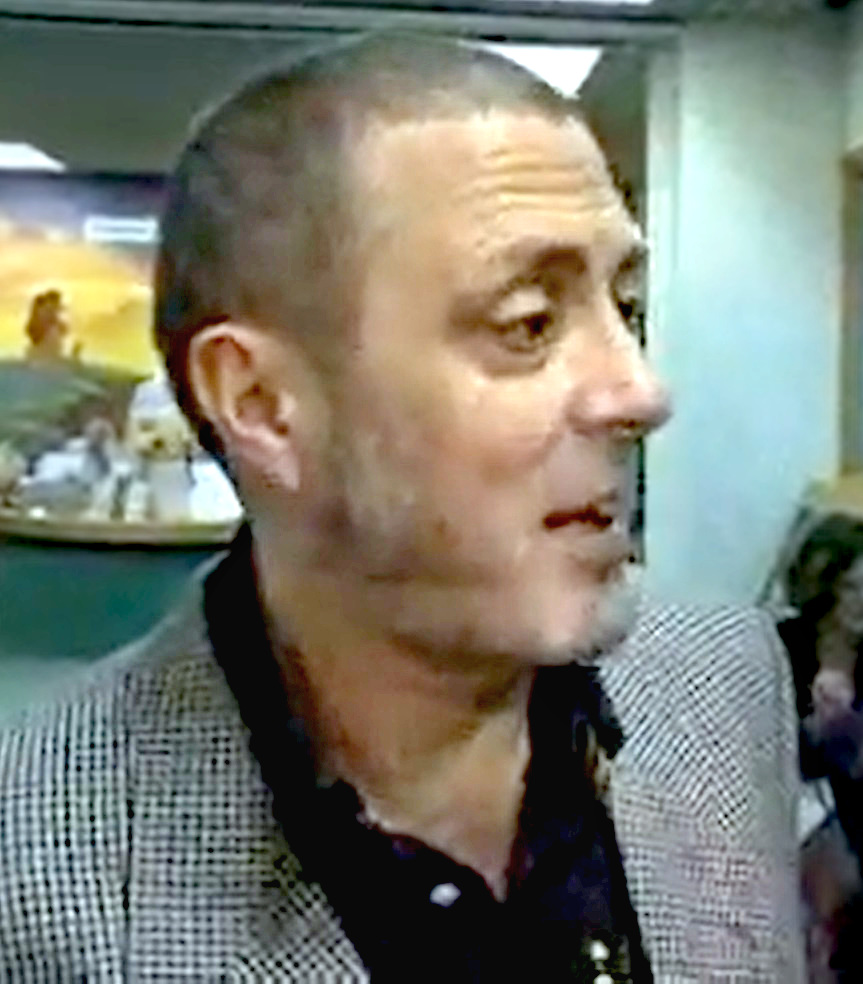
Brendan McCarthy at JDIFF 2011

After receiving 1st Class Hons MA in screenwriting from Dún Laoghaire Institute of Art, Design and Technology, in 2006, McCarthy's screenplay for the horror film Wake Wood was produced by www.fantasticfilms.ie, in partnership with the legendary studio Hammer Films. The movie was released in the U.S. by MPI Media Group in 2011.

== Career ==
He produced Outcast (2010 film) directed by Colm McCarthy (director) and starring James Nesbitt, Kate Dickie and fellow Scottish actress Hannah Stanbridge, who received a Scottish BAFTA for her role in the film.

Other films include The Last Days on Mars (2013), the debut feature film from Oscar-nominated Irish director Ruairí Robinson, selected for Directors' Fortnight at Cannes Film Festival, 2013; the award-winning Stitches (movie) 2012, directed by Conor McMahon and starring Ross Noble and Tommy Knight, the Bollywood hit Ek Tha Tiger 2012, directed by Kabir Khan (director) and starring Salman Khan and Katrina Kaif, the critically acclaimed Hammer Horror Wake Wood 2011, directed by David Keating and starring Timothy Spall, Aidan Gillen and Eva Birthistle.

In 2019, he produced the film Vivarium, which starred Imogen Poots and Jesse Eisenberg.

== Filmography ==
=== Writer ===
- The Cherry Tree (2013)
- Wake Wood (2011)
- The Metal Man (1989)

=== Producer ===
- Dead Meat (executive producer, 2004)
- Man About Dog (executive producer, 2004)
- Breakfast on Pluto (executive producer, 2005)
- 48 Angels (executive producer, 2007)
- Outcast (producer, 2010)
- Wake Wood (producer, 2011)
- Ek Tha Tiger (executive producer, 2012)
- Stitches (producer, 2012)
- The Last Days on Mars (co-producer, 2013)
- Muse (co-producer, 2017)
- Vivarium (producer, 2019)
- Woken (producer, 2024)
