= Anthony Brophy =

Irish actor

- Born: 1969 (age 56–57); Hammersmith, England
- Occupation: Actor
- Years active: 1992–present
- Spouse: Amelia Crowley

Anthony Brophy is an English-born Irish actor. Brophy has had various roles in films, short-films, television programmes, theatre, and in a video game.

Brophy has appeared in In the Name of the Father, The Professor and the Madman, The Tudors as Imperial Ambassador Eustace Chapuys, Vikings as King Svase, and in Red Rock as Liam Reid.

== Career ==
Brophy was born in Hammersmith, London to Irish parents. He started acting at the age of 16, first with the Dublin Youth Theatre, and then with the National Youth Theatre. Brophy moved from there to work at Irish theatres, such as the Abbey Theatre in Dublin and the Druid in Galway. He has also worked in West End theatres in London.

== Filmography ==
=== Film ===
Year	Show	Role	Notes
1992	The Bargain Shop	Locusts	
1993	In the Name of the Father	Danny	
1995	The Run of the Country	Prunty	
1995	Nothing Personal	Malachy	
1996	Some Mother's Son	Prisoner's Leader	
1997	The Informant	Gerard	
1997	Snow White: A Tale of Terror	Rolf	
1997	The Last Bus Home	Billy	
2000	Ordinary Decent Criminal	Liam	
2001	Mapmaker	Kieran Maguire	
2001	Never Say Never Mind: The Swedish Bikini Team	Sean	
2002	The Gathering Storm	Brendan Bracken	TV Film
2003	Benedict Arnold: A Question of Honor	Lord Lauderdale	
2007	Frankie	Frankie's Dad	
2009	Dust	James	Short Film
2011	Boomtown	James	Short Film
2011	The Shore	Hughie	Short Film
2019	The Professor and the Madman	Sergeant Steggles	
2022	Lady Chatterley's Lover	Sir Malcolm Reid	
2023	Haunted Harmony Mysteries: Murder in G Major	Officer Declan	TV Film

=== Television ===
Year	Show	Role	Notes
1995	The Governor	Winchwood	1 episode
1996	Ballykissangel	Edso	1 episode
1997	Desert of Fire	Maggiordomo and Butler Gaston	Miniseries
1999	DDU: District Detective Unit	John Sullivan	1 episode
2001	CSI: Crime Scene Investigation	Hal (Aircraft Mechanic)	1 episode
2001	Rebel Heart	Mulcahy	4 episodes
2005	Pure Mule	Skunk	2 episodes
2006	The Clinic	Simon Andrews	1 episode
2007–2010	The Tudors	Eustace Chapuys	28 episodes
2011	Prime Suspect USA	Mickey Pendergast	1 episode
2013	Vikings	King Svase	4 episodes
2014	Penny Dreadful	Alphonse	1 episode
2015–2016	Red Rock	Laim Reid	65 episodes
2016	The Crown	James Jesus Angleton	1 episode
2016	The Trial of the Century	Eoin MacNeill	2 episodes
2017	Coronation Street	Ross Watson	1 episode
2020	Penance	Ed Grayling	1 episode
2022	Wreck	Steven Cochrane	2 episodes
2024	FBI: International	Commissario Capo Mastroianni	1 episode

=== Video Games ===
Year	Show	Role	Notes
2013	BioShock Infinite	Dock worker, Homeless Man, and Vox Populi	

== Personal life ==
Brophy is married to fellow actor Amelia Crowley. They have two children.
