= List of Tracy Beaker Returns episodes =

Tracy Beaker Returns is a United Kingdom children's television series, broadcast on CBBC and simultaneously aired on BBC HD. Based on the novels by Jacqueline Wilson, the series focuses on older Tracy Beaker, who returns to the Dumping Ground as a care worker. The first series premiered on 8 January 2010 and ended on 26 March 2010, consisting of 13 episodes. Series two premiered on 7 January 2011 and ended on 25 March 2011, also consisting of 13 episodes. Series three premiered on 6 January 2012 and ended on 23 March 2012, again consisting of 13 episodes. A spin-off series was then commissioned by the CBBC, titled The Dumping Ground, which began airing in 2013.

== Series overview ==
Series	Episodes	Originally released	
Series	Episodes	First released	Last released
1	13	8 January 2010	26 March 2010
2	13	7 January 2011	25 March 2011
3	13	6 January 2012	23 March 2012

== Episodes ==
=== Series 1 (2010) ===
No.	Title	Directed by	Written by	Original release date	Prod. code
1	"Tracy Beaker Superstar (Full Circle Part 1)"	Neasa Hardiman	Elly Brewer and Ben Ward	8 January 2010	1.1
2	"New Life's Eve (Full Circle Part 2)"	Neasa Hardiman	Elly Brewer and Ben Ward	8 January 2010	1.2
3	"Bad Luck Boy"	Neasa Hardiman	Jonathan Evans	15 January 2010	1.3
4	"By The Book"	Neasa Hardiman	Steven Turner	22 January 2010	1.4
5	"Family Values"	Craig Lines	James Nicol and Jonathan Wolfman	29 January 2010	1.5
6	"Anarchy In The DG"	Craig Lines	Elly Brewer and Ben Ward	5 February 2010	1.6
7	"Secrets"	Craig Lines	Emma Reeves	12 February 2010	1.7
8	"Sisters"	Craig Lines	Elly Brewer and Ben Ward	19 February 2010	1.8
9	"Good Luck Boy"	Michael Davies	Emma Reeves	26 February 2010	1.9
10	"Viva Carmen"	Michael Davies	Elly Brewer and Ben Ward	5 March 2010	1.10
11	"The Werewolf"	Michael Davies	Steven Turner	12 March 2010	1.11
12	"A Day At The Beach"	Michael Davies	Jonathan Evans	19 March 2010	1.12
13	"Moving On"	Michael Davies	Elly Brewer and Ben Ward	26 March 2010	1.13

=== Series 2 (2011) ===
No.	Title	Directed by	Written by	Original release date	Prod. code
1	"The Burnywood Menace (Fallen Part 1)"	Neasa Hardiman	Elly Brewer and Ben Ward	7 January 2011	2.1
The Dumping Ground in threatened with closure when the Council impose sweeping budget cuts. Meanwhile, Lily is offered to move back in with Matt and Christie along with Poppy and Rosie; however, Lily feels isolated whilst at the Perrys'. Christie takes Lily to the Dumping Ground, where Carmen tells Lily that if she stays with her foster family, the council might reconsider closing Elm Tree House. But Lily wishes to stay at the Dumping Ground, as she feels she doesn't fit in at the Perrys'. Can Tracy save Elm Tree House with a Tracy Beaker Plan? Or will the young people be sent to Burnywood? First Appearance: Mille Redfearn as Rosie Kettle
2	"Drained (Fallen Part 2)"	Neasa Hardiman	Elly Brewer and Ben Ward	7 January 2011	2.2
The Dumping Ground re-opens and Mike is suspended due to investigation about Lily's fall from the roof in the previous episode. Lily successfully recovers the fall and is moved out of hospital when Cam decides to foster Lily. Tracy brings Lily back to the Dumping Ground for a visit. But Carmen and Sapphire now hate her for supposedly causing them to move to Burnywood. Mike is later taken into court for a hearing. Absent: John Bell as Toby Coleman
3	"Crushed"	Neasa Hardiman	Jonathan Evans	14 January 2011	2.3
When Lily moves into Cam's house, Tracy starts to feel jealous as she is used to having just the two of them together and now she feels Lily has all the attention. Tracy decides to get a night job at a cafe to put her mind elsewhere. Meanwhile, everyone at the Dumping Ground starts to have their doubts about Toby returning to the care home so everyone decides to take all of his stuff to keep. Toby starts talking to a girl named Sara at the comic book store and realise that the two have very much in common, but when Toby tells her that his parents are still alive and that he has two sisters, Sara tells Toby that her mother had died. Toby then returns to the Dumping Ground realising everything he owned has gone. Can Tracy be a proper sister and can Toby tell the truth?
4	"Refugees"	Neasa Hardiman	Dawn Harrison	21 January 2011	2.4
Two refugees named Ade and Dayo are left at the Dumping Ground and Gus tries to find out what their story is. Lily decides that she wants some visitors from the Dumping Ground, but not while Cam's absent. However, Tracy decides to bring Tee and Carmen back to her flat to surprise Lily. Ade and Dayo reveal that their parents had been killed by men with guns and they both ran and hid in a rubbish dump. Tracy brings Tee and Carmen back to Cam's house and they all organise a fashion show. Mike receives a word from Immigration Control that they are coming to take the two boys away – or are they?
5	"Money"	Craig Lines	Emma Reeves	28 January 2011	2.5
When a big bag of cash is dumped in the garden, Liam, Frank and Toby decide to hide it in their bedrooms, only to be found by Carmen and the rest who take a share of the money to hide in their rooms. Toby meets his social worker, Seth, and thinks that he is one of the people getting the money back. Liam and Frank decide to spend their share of the money on a new television, but end up running from security. Two police officers arrive at the Dumping Ground to search for the money, but after searching the garden, the police officers find no trace of the money. What will the kids do and are the two cops really what they are? First Appearance: Ashley Taylor-Rhys as Seth Foreman
6	"Elektra"	Craig Lines	Elly Brewer and Ben Ward	4 February 2011	2.6
A new girl called Elektra arrives at the Dumping Ground. But she ends up stealing and threatening to do something to the kids if they tell the adults what she has done. After she becomes the most popular person there, she tries to steal even more money and possessions by starting a gang (SETA). Tracy and Sapphire accidentally use the pasta sauce for the curry, and then go out shopping for food to replace their mistake. They go and have sausages and then they find out that they have enough money for a bus ride home, leading them to be dressed as giant sausages. First Appearance Jessica Revell as Elektra Perkins
7	"What You Don't Know"	Craig Lines	Emma Reeves	11 February 2011	2.7
Johnny and Tee have a chance to be fostered by the Watsons. Things don't work out though, as the Watsons think that Johnny dominates Tee. Mike and Tracy tell Johnny that it wasn't his fault, but he reads his file and finds out it was. He decides that Tee should go and live with the Watsons without him. Johnny tries to phone Tee every day, but stops because Mr. Watson told him so. When Tee discovers what Mr. Watson has done, she is disgusted and returns to the Dumping Ground.
8	"A Day in the Country"	Craig Lines	Jonathan Evans	18 February 2011	2.8
Mike and Gina have planned the weekend in the countryside to perfection. That is, until Gina twists her ankle and can't join in with the activities. While Liam and Elektra tease each other about who is going to win, Tracy is made the new leader of Gina's team, with the other team leader being Mike. Feeling that Tracy and Harry are slowing down the team's chances of winning, Elektra changes the first waymark direction from left to right, so that Tracy ends up leading their team the wrong way. Elektra then sets off with Toby and Carmen, after telling Tracy that she can't lead them anywhere. While the other team is more confident, danger comes in Tracy's team when Carmen falls over a bridge and Jeff is confronted by a poisonous snake.
9	"The Scare Game"	Michael Davies	Elly Brewer	25 February 2011	2.9
Tracy takes Lily out shopping, but unexpectedly Lily's dad, Steve Kettle, shows up to say sorry. Lily wants to get some answers from him, so she and Sapphire follow him to his hotel without telling Tracy. Lily then reveals that she wants to stay with her dad. But is Steve ready yet? Tracy is upset about this, as she loves Lily as her little foster sister, but Cam says that both of them never really had her, and that they are just giving her back. Meanwhile, Liam, Frank, Toby, Carmen and Tee are trying to scare each other to teach Gus about freaking people out, but they always end up scaring someone else – including Mike and Gina. In the end, Mike and Gina give them a fright.
10	"Out of Control"	Michael Davies	Dave Ingham	4 March 2011	2.10
Liam and Frank are out in town and Liam starts 'messing around' on a mobility scooter and gets caught by its owner, Mr. Spooner and the police. Liam is summoned to the court and is given seven days' community service in an old people's home, where Mr. Spooner lives. After a brief confrontation between the duo, Liam and Mr. Spooner bond over their similar characteristic traits. But there is a scooter scammer at the nursery home. Liam is out to find what is going on. Meanwhile, everyone at the Dumping Ground are joking about Gus dating a girl, named Jenny.
11	"Snake Bite"	Michael Davies	Elly Brewer & Ben Ward	11 March 2011	2.11
Elektra's old friend, Kali, turns up, claiming she's changed, and it seems she and Elektra were in a gang, called The Cobras, who weren't very nice. This led to Kali being sent to a detention centre. But when she and Elektra sneak out, Kali seems like she is back to her old tricks with a gang of new Cobra members. Kali persuades Elektra to run away with her and the gang, so Elektra goes to pack her things. Toby tries to stop her, but she goes anyway. But when Toby gets into trouble with the gang, it gets Elektra thinking straight - has Kali really changed? Meanwhile, Gina is preparing for a dance night with her husband, Greg, but finds that her dancing is being mocked by the children so decides not to go. Liam, Frank, Johnny, Carmen and Tee try to force Gina to go dancing.
12	"Grandad"	Michael Davies	Dawn Harrison	18 March 2011	2.12
It's Eric Matthews' 79th birthday today and his grandson, Frank, is ready to go on their annual fishing trip with him at their special lake. But Frank learns, to his distress, that his granddad died nearly a week earlier, and the funeral has already been held yesterday. At his granddad's grave, Frank vows to get him a headstone and, to get extra money, sells his only family heirloom – the antique pocket watch his granddad gave him – to a dodgy antiques dealer, named Xanthe. When Frank returns with the money, he gets more bad news: his grandfather is buried in a multi-occupancy pauper's grave and isn't allowed a headstone. However, Tracy comes up with a cunning plan to make the dealer part with the heirloom.
13	"Chain Reaction"	Michael Davies	Dystin Johnson	25 March 2011	2.13
When Cam goes to New York for four weeks, Tracy is finding it hard to live alone, causing her to work beyond shifts at the Dumping Ground. To make it more difficult for Tracy, Cam is offered a six-month contract over in New York to which she happily accepts thanks to Lily choosing to have her respite care at the Dumping Ground. Meanwhile, a friendship blossoms between Carmen and Elektra, but is soon ruined when Lily returns and that Carmen had asked Elektra to give her necklace back, so she could then give it to Lily as a welcome-home present. Jealous and angry, Elektra begins to bully Carmen. Meanwhile, Gus and the rest of the others try to make the world's longest paper chain for a party. Last Appearance: John Bell as Toby Coleman

=== Series 3 (2012) ===
No.	Title	Directed by	Written by	Original release date	Prod. code
1	"The Visitors (Slow Burn - Part 1)"	Craig Lines	Elly Brewer and Emma Reeves	6 January 2012	3.1
When a fire breaks out in Burnywood, four young children and their mysterious care worker, Dennis Stockle, arrive at the Dumping Ground. Carmen recognises one of the children as a boy, called Tyler Lewis, who nicked all her stuff at Burnywood and the person who bashed her and craves revenge. Since Sapphire has moved out, Rick Barber and Tyler sleep in Sapphire's room and Kitty sleeps in Toby's now that he got fostered. Carmen finds out that someone has used her shampoo and was refilled with glue, while Tracy tries to help Kitty settle in. Later, Johnny's money is stolen and he thinks Lizanne has stolen it because she was the only one who saw it. Dennis searches everywhere, but the money can't be found. But things have gone worse when Tracy falls down the stairs and Dennis sees this as an opportunity to take over the running of the Dumping Ground. Note: This episode and the following instalment, Firestarter (Slow Burn - Part 2), were originally broadcast as one double-length episode. First Appearance: Daniel Pearson as Rick Barber and Miles Butler-Hughton as Tyler Lewis
2	"Firestarter (Slow Burn - Part 2)"	Craig Lines	Elly Brewer and Emma Reeves	6 January 2012	3.2
Dennis Stockle has taken over the Dumping Ground, and there are notices everywhere banning everything allowed before "By Order of Dennis Stockle". A fire breaks out in the attic. Dennis thinks Harry is responsible because he was burning joss sticks. Gus's notebooks have been burnt and Dennis locks the attic. Tracy and Gus start an investigation into the fire and enter the attic, but Gus falls through the floor and lands on Lily's bed. Dennis fires Tracy, and subsequently tries to frame Lizanne for the fire at Burnywood. It is revealed that Dennis started the Dumping Ground fire by smoking in the attic and when found out he is forced to resign his job which made Tracy reinstated, Mike back as Head Careworker and Gina back as a Careworker. Departed: Daniel Pearson as Rick Barber
3	"Shadows"	Craig Lines	Steve Turner	13 January 2012	3.3
It was also mentioned that Rick is fostered. There is a storm and a escaped prisoner. Tracy is left in charge of the kids when Mike goes to get some torches. They all think the prisoner has entered the house when the front door is open and there are muddy footprints on the floor. They take a search, but find nothing. Tee and Lily go to the cellar to try and solve some riddles, but Carmen will not go because she is scared. A figure goes past Carmen's door and she screams. Gus's room also gets wrecked. Later, they found out that it was Johnny. Tee and Lily then found a time capsule which was a video of Tracy when she was young
4	"Big Brother"	Craig Lines	Dave Ingham	20 January 2012	3.4
Liam gets scammed with some pirate DVDs and wrecks the stall where he bought them. Fleeing, he bumps into a woman who thinks he is a mugger. The stallholders leave him to get arrested and Liam is punished with a curfew and electronic tag – if the alarm goes off three times, Liam will be sent to a youth offenders' detention institute. Liam gets a letter from a big brother he didn't even know he had. Liam finds out that his brother (Jack) was actually the guy who sold the pirate DVDs and Jack wants Liam to live with him in Jack's flat. Last Appearance: Richard Wisker as Liam O'Donovan
5	"Belonging"	Michael Davis	Dawn Harrison	27 January 2012	3.5
Hoping to re-unite the family, Lily has coached her dad Steve in all things Poppy and Rosie in readiness for his first meeting with them. But, having no memory of their dad, Poppy and Rosie run out crying. Convinced Steve would do better without official interference, Carmen and Tee help Lily plot a second meeting between Lily and her sisters – without telling anyone her dad will be there too; Tracy is persuaded to take the girls to the park where Steve is waiting with a picnic spread. Meanwhile, Frank secretly adopts a three-legged dog that follows him back to the Dumping Ground while he was posting a letter to Liam, which the kids name Shadow. When Shadow pees in his bedroom and gives him fleas, Frank takes it to Sapphire who refuses to adopt it. Fortunately, Shadow finds a new home with Steve and Lily. Last Appearance: Katie Anderson as Poppy Kettle and Mille Redfearn as Rosie Kettle
6	"Eggs"	Michael Davis	Dystin Johnson	3 February 2012	3.6
The kids want a new computer, but Mike will not get one until they prove they can look after their things. So Tracy sets an 'egg sitting' challenge; the kids team up in pairs to look after an egg without smashing it. Meanwhile, Sapphire tells Harry, who is visiting her at her flat with Carmen and Tracy, that she is not his mum and he has to get used to her not being at the Dumping Ground. Carmen offers to be his mum instead and back at the Dumping Ground they team up for the egg challenge. Harry soon asks why he and Jeff (Harry's toy giraffe, which he takes everywhere) can't go back and live with his real mother, and Tracy explains that his mother used to hurt him. Meanwhile, Rick came home from is foster family Returned: Daniel Pearson as Rick Barber
7	"Justine Littlewood Returns"	Michael Davis	Emma Reeves	10 February 2012	3.7
Justine Littlewood, Tracy's arch-enemy from her time in care, arrives at the Dumping Ground, wanting Mike to give her away at her wedding as she is marrying Charlie, who is actually a sleazy conman. Charlie ends up running into Rick, but bribes him to keep his mouth shut with a new computer, which everyone was trying to get in the previous episode, Eggs. Justine arrives in shock that after years of wanting to leave, Tracy actually works where they both grew up. After asking Mike if he can give Justine away at the wedding and he accepts. All the kids come in, and are judging her by what Tracy said in her book. Guest Appearance: Montanna Thompson as Justine Littlewood
8	"Reward"	Craig Lines	Jonathan Evans	17 February 2012	3.8
It is the annual care home certificate awards, where each child gets given a certificate so the children can feel special about themselves. Normally, Mike would make the certificates, however disaster strikes so Tracy has to do it this year. Tracy made one for everyone but Johnny, as she couldn't think of one to describe him as other than 'Clean and Tidy'. Johnny stands on the other side of the door, overhearing the conversation; seeking revenge he turns to Elektra for help. Meanwhile, Sapphire arrives and finds out she didn't get an award, as the awards are based from last year. Angry at being humiliated, Sapphire storms home where Johnny and Elektra are already at her flat. Johnny wanders off to another person's apartment where there are loads of stolen phones, games etc., but the occupants turn out to be robbers and grab him; they smash a painting of the Dumping Ground made by Sapphire. The bullies aim to carry out a robbery and pick one of the trio to do the work for them. Johnny picks himself. The bullies warn Sapphire and Elektra that if they follow them, Johnny will be hurt...
9	"Summer Holiday"	Michael Davis	Jonathan Evans	24 February 2012	3.9
Everyone’s off to a farmhouse in the country for the start of the annual Dumping Ground holiday. But when Tee accidentally leaves the field gate open and the sheep get into the farmer's house, the farmer throws everyone out. Tensions build as the young people take their anger out on Tee. She tries to make it up to them by looking for another holiday. Meanwhile, Lily is planning to go to Wales where her dad is camping out for the holidays, and persuades Carmen to come with her. Tee finds out when she sees them looking for coach times to Wales, and Lily and Carmen blackmail her into not telling. Tee gets worried with guilt, and she tries to get advice from Gus, without telling him that they've run away.
10	"Going Home"	Neasa Hardiman	Dawn Harrison	2 March 2012	3.10
Elektra's sister Melissa arrives, announcing that she is getting married and wants Elektra to be her bridesmaid. Melissa takes Elektra shopping to get a new dress and says she wants Elektra to visit their mum and dad; she agrees, and takes Tracy with her. However, Elecktra ends up having a huge argument with her mum and dad because they had not told Melissa's soon-to-be husband that she is in care (having told him instead that Elektra was away at boarding school), and goes back to the Dumping Ground. Meanwhile, Sapphire comes back due to a flood at her flat and gets angry very quickly.
11	"Jody Jackson"	Neasa Hardiman	Elly Brewer	9 March 2012	3.11
Jody Jackson arrives like a whirlwind – dirty, smelly and taking no attitude from anyone. With the Dumping Ground full, Jody must share with Carmen, threatening Lily’s respite care. Carmen doesn't like this arrangement and when Jody borrows her cardigan when she feels cold, Elektra locks Jody in the toy cupboard to stop the fighting which is happening in the living room where she is watching TV. Seeing as she doesn't fit in, Jody runs away back to her home – only to find her mum and brothers have abandoned the house. Meanwhile, Mike cancels Lily's respite care, since her dad is coping well, but Tracy feels that Lily is upset about this arrangement. First Appearance: Kia Pegg as Jody Jackson
12	"The Invitation"	Neasa Hardiman	Steve Turner	16 March 2012	3.12
Mike is stunned by the news that he’s been nominated to receive an MBE and everyone is excited about a potential trip to the Palace. But when Mike discovers he can only take three guests along with him, Tracy comes up with a plan to let the young people democratically decide who should go with him. Elektra also bribes her way to go to the palace, as she plans to ruin Mike's big day. She also involves Rick, who hates the Queen (as his parents are in prison), and will do anything to annoy her. Rick calls down Gus to join the kids, and finds out that it was Gus who had recommended Mike for the MBE. The children decide that Harry (along with Jeff, of course), Gus and Tracy should go to the Palace. Note: This episode features a special one-off credit for Connor Byrne on the closing titles, which reads 'Mike MBE'.
13	"Goodbye Tracy Beaker"	Neasa Hardiman	Elly Brewer	23 March 2012	3.13
Tracy is leaving The Dumping Ground and everyone has a party. Mike hires a new girl called Melanie Jay, and she saves Jody's life as Jody goes into anaphylactic shock after eating nuts; Jody is taken to hospital. When Sapphire says she wants to move back into her flat, Tracy and Sapphire make their way to the flat to protest against the council, who have sold the building off. Mike follows them and orders Sapphire to leave. Tracy and Mike argue. When Tracy exits the flat, she slams the door and the ceiling collapses on Mike. Luckily, Tracy saves Mike and she is glad that he is all right. Tracy and Mike say a tearful farewell. How far can Tracy go? Tracy Beaker will always be part of the family. Last Appearance: Dani Harmer as Tracy Beaker, Saffron Coomber as Sapphire Fox, Lisa Coleman as Cam Lawson and Ashley Taylor-Rhys as Seth Foreman

== Spin off media ==
=== Tracy Beaker Survival Files (2011–2012) ===
A thirteen part series entitled "Tracy Beaker Survival Files" was aired and featured clips from Tracy Beaker Returns and The Story of Tracy Beaker.

Episode in series	Title	Original air date
1	"Falling Out"	16 December 2011
2	"Romance"	17 December 2011
3	"Persuasion"	18 December 2011
4	"Anger"	19 December 2011
5	"Fear"	20 December 2011
6	"Rules"	21 December 2011
7	"Doing the Right Thing"	22 December 2011
8	"Siblings"	23 December 2011
9	"Responsibility"	2 January 2012
10	"Lies"	3 January 2012
11	"First Impressions"	4 January 2012
12	"Secrets"	5 January 2012
13	"Goodbyes"	6 January 2012
