= John Travers (actor) =

Northern Irish actor (born 1989)

- Born: 31 January 1989 (age 37); Belfast, Northern Ireland
- Occupation: Actor
- Years active: 2003–present

John Travers (born 31 January 1989) is a Northern Irish actor. He is perhaps best known for his role in the film Song for a Raggy Boy (2003).

== Career ==
He was best known from his role in the Song for a Raggy Boy and 48 Angels. His role as Liam Mercier (lead boy) in Song for a Raggy Boy is probably the most notable achievement so far. This role had won the audience award at Normandy film festival specialising in the best British and Irish recent releases as well as other 17 awards along the way.

In 2007, he starred with Mischa Barton in the World War I film Closing the Ring, the final film directed by Richard Attenborough. His recent role as Young Michel Quinlan (Pete Postlethwaite in older version) in Closing the Ring had brought this young man from Belfast (his hometown) to international eyes.

In 2008, John was in Peacefire. In the movie which was directed by Macdara Vallely, John took the lead role for the first time.

== Filmography ==
- Song for a Raggy Boy (2003) as Liam Mercier 636
- Man About Dog (2004) as Kid Leader
- The Mighty Celt (2005) as Spacer
- 48 Angels (2006) as James McCane
- Wilderness (2006) as Davie
- Closing the Ring (2007) as Young Quinlan
- Peacefire (2008) as Colin McNally
- Five Day Shelter (2010) as Robbie
- Grand Mal (2010 short) as Pawel
- Good Vibrations (2012) as Mutt
- Two Dogs Caged (Short 2013)
- A Belfast Story (2011) as youth 1
- Fishbowl City (Short 2014) as Steven
- The Truth Commissioner (2016)
- Frankie (Aka White Irish Drinkers) (Short 2018) as Frankie

== Theatre ==
- 2012 - Basra Boy by Rosemary Jenkinson, presented by Brassneck Theatre Company
