= Seán McGinley =

Irish actor (born 1 March 1956)

- Born: 1956 (age 69–70); Pettigo, County Donegal, Ireland
- Other name: Sean McGinley
- Education: NUI Galway
- Occupation: Actor
- Spouse: Marie Mullen (m. 1990)
- Children: 2

Seán McGinley (born 1 March 1956) is an Irish actor. He has appeared in about 80 films and television series.

== Early life ==
McGinley was born in Pettigo, County Donegal, where his father was a customs officer, and raised in nearby Ballyshannon. He is a graduate of University College, Galway, and was a member of the Druid Theatre Company from 1977–1989. McGinley later starred in various films.

== Career ==
McGinley has appeared in such films as The General, Braveheart, The Butcher Boy, Gangs of New York, Freeze Frame, and Man About Dog. He has also starred in various television series. He played Malachy on Republic of Doyle from 2010 to 2014. He appeared in an episode of Midsomer Murders as a horse whisperer. In 2023, he played a leading role in Wait For Me.

== Filmography ==
=== Films ===
- Fools of Fortune (1990) - Doyle
- The Field (1990) - Father Chris Doran
- Circle of Friends (1995) - Mr Duggan
- Braveheart (1995) - MacClannough
- Michael Collins (1996) - Smith
- Trojan Eddie (1996) - Raymie
- The Disappearance of Finbar (1996) - Detective Roche
- The Butcher Boy (1997) - Sergeant
- A Further Gesture (1997) - Tommy Breen
- The Informant (1997) - Frankie Conroy
- The Very Stuff (1997, Short) - Sylvie
- Resurrection Man (1998) - Sammy McClure
- The General (1998) - Gary
- Lipservice (1998, Short) - Mairtín Ó Catháin
- Simon Magus (1999) - Maximillian Hase
- The Closer You Get (2000) - Ian O'Donnell
- The Claim (2000) - Sweetley
- Gangs of New York (2002) - Forty Thieves Leader
- Dead Bodies (2003) - Detective Inspector Wheeler
- Conspiracy of Silence (2003) - Rector Cathal
- Freeze Frame (2004) - Detective Louis Emeric
- Man About Dog (2004) - J.P. McCallion
- On a Clear Day (2005) - Eddie
- The Mighty Celt (2005) - I'm A Cripple
- The Wind That Shakes the Barley (2006) - Father Denis
- The Tiger's Tail (2006) - Declan Murray
- Sixty Six (2006) - Mr. O'Connor
- 48 Angels (2007) - Billy
- Shrooms (2007) - Bernie
- Closing the Ring (2007) - Campbell
- Wild Decembers (2009, TV Movie) - O'Dea
- The Truth Commissioner (2016) - Francis Gilroy
- Stalker (2019 Short) - Henry
- The Curse of Audrey Earnshaw (2020) - Seamus Dwyer
- Wait for Me (2023) - Ged
- That They May Face the Rising Sun (2023) - Johnny

=== Television ===
- 4 Play (1991) - Hugh
- Boon (1991) - Michael Roach
- Minder (1993) "Opportunity Knocks and Bruises"- Alexie Nolan
- Family (1994) - Charlo Spencer
- The Hanging Gale (1994) - Ferry
- Dangerous Lady (1995) - D.I. Murphy
- Safe and Sound (1996) - Dougy Flynn
- The Ambassador (1998) - Joseph O'Connor
- DDU: District Detective Unit (1998–1999) - Det. Sgt. Carl McCadden
- Murder Rooms: Mysteries of the Real Sherlock Holmes (2000) - Inspector Beecher
- Cold Feet (2000) - Roy
- Midsomer Murders (2001) - Sean O'Connell
- On Home Ground (2001) - Fergal Collins
- The Vice (2003) - Tommy Bowers
- Pulling Moves (2004) - Bap the Butcher
- Waking the Dead (2004) - Dr. Donald Roper
- Bleak House (2005) - Snagsby
- Taggart (2005) (S22 E3) - Monsignor Tom Jarvis
- Pure Mule (2006) - Billy Farrell
- George Gently (2007) - China Mates
- Lewis (2008) (S2 E4) “The Great and the Good” - Keiran Donnelly
- Single-Handed (2010) - Dennis Costello / Denis Costello
- Republic of Doyle (2010–2014) - Malachy Doyle
- New Tricks (2012, Episode 71 The Girl Who Lived) - Ken Wright
- Love/Hate (2012–2013) - Tony
- The Fall (2014, 1 episode, for which he was credited as a main cast member) - Father Jensen
- Clean Break (2015) - Ben
- Fir Bolg (2016) - Davy Kilbride
- Paula (2017) - Terry
- The Alienist (2018) - Bishop Potter
- Shetland (2018) - Drew McColl
- Butterfly (2018) - Peter Duffy

== Radio ==
- Parrots and Owls (1994) - James O'Shea
