= The Informant (1997 film) =

- Directed by: Jim McBride
- Screenplay by: Nicholas Meyer
- Based on: Field of Blood by Gerald Seymour
- Produced by: Leon Falk; Morgan O'Sullivan; Ted Swanson; Steven-Charles Jaffe(executive); Nicholas Meyer(executive)
- Starring: Anthony Brophy; Cary Elwes; Timothy Dalton
- Cinematography: Affonso Beato
- Music by: Shane MacGowan
- Production companies: RHI Entertainment; Showtime
- Release date: September 5, 1997
- Running time: 105 minutes
- Countries: United States; Ireland
- Language: English

The Informant is a 1997 cable TV movie produced by Showtime, starring Anthony Brophy, Cary Elwes and Timothy Dalton. It was directed by Jim McBride and written by Nicholas Meyer based upon the book Field of Blood by Gerald Seymour.

== Plot ==
The film tells the story of Sean Pius McAnally "Gingy" and the journey he makes on his way to becoming a supergrass. Gingy is reluctantly pulled out of retirement in a caravan in the Republic of Ireland by two IRA men who bring him back to Belfast to perform one last job due to his skill with an RPG. On their way back they are stopped by a British Army patrol led by Lt. David Ferris who introduces himself to Gingy. Gingy initially refuses the job but realises he has no choice after the Chief of the Belfast Brigade briefs him and threatens him. The job entails the killing of a judge using an RPG, during the getaway the gang smash through a roadblock and one of the soldiers from the previous patrol recognises Gingy from the previous checkpoint.

== Cast ==
- Anthony Brophy as Sean Pius "Gingy" McAnally
- Cary Elwes as Lt. David Ferris
- Timothy Dalton as DCI Rennie
- Maria Lennon as Roisin McAnally
- John Kavanagh as IRA Chief
- Seán McGinley as Frankie Conroy
- Frankie McCafferty as Dalton
- Stuart Graham as Det. Astley

== Reception ==
David Stratton of Variety had criticized the affair between Gingy and Roisin McAnally and the film's conclusion, blaming Nicholas Meyer. He did, however, praise Jim McBride, the director of the film, as well as the main cast and Mark Geraghty and Eva Gardos for production and editing respectively. Stratton also praised the opening credits song "Dirty Old Town" and music by The Pogues in general.
