= The Delinquent Season =

- Theatrical release poster
- Directed by: Mark O'Rowe
- Written by: Mark O'Rowe
- Produced by: Alan Moloney; Ruth Coady
- Starring: Cillian Murphy; Catherine Walker; Eva Birthistle; Andrew Scott
- Cinematography: Richard Kendrick
- Edited by: Eoin McGuirk
- Music by: Antony Genn; Martin Slattery
- Production companies: Parallel Films; Cuba Pictures; RTÉ; Head Gear Films; Metrol Technology
- Distributed by: Element Pictures
- Release dates: 8 March 2018 (DIFF); 27 April 2018 (Ireland)
- Running time: 103 minutes
- Country: Ireland
- Language: English
- Box office: $39,194

The Delinquent Season is a 2018 Irish romantic drama film written and directed by Mark O'Rowe in his feature film directorial debut. It follows the story of two married couples in suburban Dublin who begin to experience difficulties in their respective relationships. The film was released theatrically in Ireland on 27 April 2018 by Element Pictures.

== Plot ==
Yvonne is waiting in a restaurant alone for someone. An undisclosed man arrives and greets Yvonne.

Jim and his wife Danielle are hosting a dinner, with Danielle's best friend Yvonne and her husband Chris as guests. A disagreement erupts between Yvonne and Chris during the dinner, and they continue to argue even after getting home.

One day, after locking himself out of his house along with his children and with Danielle at work, Jim visits Yvonne to collect the spare key to his house, and end up having a conversation with her regarding their work, relationships with spouses etc. A few days later, Yvonne and her children turns up at Jim's and Danielle's doorstep in the middle of the night following a physical attack by Chris towards Yvonne. Jim visits Chris to pick up some things and learns that Chris's outbursts and mood swings stem from a terminal brain disease, which he hasn't yet disclosed to his family and he swears Jim to secrecy.

Yvonne wakes up late the next morning and learns from Jim that Danielle took the children to school on her way to work. They begin talking and Yvonne confesses her feelings towards Jim and starts seducing him, who reciprocates and they have sex, thus kindling an extramarital affair. They regularly meet the following weeks in a hotel room to have sex and after some time they decide to walk out of their respective marriages.

One day, Yvonne fails to turn up and Jim falls asleep at the hotel room waiting for her and is late to pick his children up from school. He lies to the headteacher as to why this was, but is caught later by Danielle when he tells her a different lie. Danielle, suspecting Jim to be having an affair, asks for the passcode to his phone. He refuses and confesses that he had an affair for a few weeks with a younger girl and is forced to leave the house.

Jim later turns up at Yvonne's doorstep, wanting to know if Yvonne will return to him upon Chris's death and he confesses his love for her. Yvonne, having learnt of Chris's illness and Jim's prior knowledge of the same, is angry with Jim and rejects the prospect of pursuing a relationship with him. Jim visits Chris at the hospital who reveals that Yvonne had told him about their affair and asked for his permission to be with Jim after his death.

In a bar, a lonely Jim runs into Orla, a waitress with whom he previously had a dispute at a restaurant, which resulted in her being fired. They share drinks and in the morning Jim wakes up next to Orla and receives a call from Danielle informing him of Chris's death. Orla asks to see Jim again, but on his rejection, she hurls abuses at him and bursts into tears. At Chris's funeral, Danielle is present with Robert, her new partner. Upon learning that his kids actually like Robert, an upset Jim fights with him only to get beaten up. He ends up at a hospital with bruises and has an emotional breakdown.

Sometime later, Yvonne is waiting in a restaurant alone, as she was at the beginning of the film. It is revealed that the person she was waiting for was Jim. They catch up and Yvonne suggests rekindling their relationship. Yvonne returns home and cries. Jim returns home to Orla, with whom he is living. Jim assures Orla that he felt nothing for Yvonne upon seeing her again and they dance, saying "I love you" to each other.

== Cast ==
- Cillian Murphy as Jim
- Eva Birthistle as Danielle
- Catherine Walker as Yvonne
- Andrew Scott as Chris
- Lydia McGuinness as Orla

== Production ==
The Delinquent Season was filmed in Dublin.

== Reception ==
Harry Guerin gave the film four stars, remarking, "If this film reminds us of anything, it's not to let go lightly."

Tara Brady of The Irish Times was much more negative, giving it two stars out of five, saying, "The denizens of The Delinquent Season are all ghastly and yet – despite valiant efforts from a talented ensemble cast – not quite horrid enough to be interesting or engaging. [...] O'Rowe's stylised language – an often potent dialect that sets observational banter to Mametian rhythms – sounds off-key on a big screen."
