= Hollywood Trials =

Irish television series

Hollywood Trials is an observational documentary series which ran on RTÉ Two Ireland, in 2008.

The series followed ten Irish actors trying to break into Hollywood. The participants lived together as a group for four weeks as they were groomed and coached by experts in the field, including audition coach Margie Haber, who was also part of the selection panel which included Declan Lowney and Ros Hubbard. The programme concluded with a few of the actors, including Green and Ateh receiving offers from Hollywood agents.

Hollywood Trials was produced for RTÉ by Red Pepper Productions.

== Participants ==
- Annemarie Gaillard
- Audrey McCoy
- Cat Lundy
- Chris Newman
- Emmett J. Scanlan
- George McMahon
- Holly White
- Joe McKinney
- Michael Graham
- Susan Ateh (actor)
