= Ferocious Planet =

- DVD cover
- Written by: Douglas G. Davis
- Directed by: Billy O'Brien

Production
- Producer: Mary Callery
- Editor: Grainne Gavigan
- Running time: 88 minutes

Original release
- Network: Syfy
- Release: April 9, 2011

Ferocious Planet (alternate titles: The Other Side or Alien Gateway) is a 2011 American television film co-produced by Syfy and MNG films. It was filmed on location in Ireland. It is the twenty-fourth film in the Maneater film series.

== Plot ==
At the Federal Institute of Sciences, a device capable of visualizing parallel dimensions was created. Colonel Sam Synn receives Dr. Karen Fast, Josh Burke, Al Icia and Senator Jackson Crenshaw during the presentation. However, the machine ends up failing, transporting the group of observers, Dr. O'Hara and her assistant Brian Murphy to a terrifying dimension populated by alien beasts of prey

Colonel Sam kills an alien creature with two pairs of three eyes. An earthquake strikes at the scene, Lex has a heart attack, but the senator thinks it is all a joke. But when they leave the place, they discover that they really are in a parallel dimension. The senator is cut in half by a mysterious creature that attacks them.

They then decide to explore the site, only to discover that the earthquake was actually the building that slid off a hill. Later they are confronted by the creature that kills soldier Jordan Reid. Sam kills the creature, but the explosion causes the building to collapse.

Soon afterward, they are forced to leave the site due to the presence of more creatures. On the way, they come across a lot of debris brought in by the force of the machine's explosion. O'Hara deduces that to fix the machine, they need water, so they split into two groups. Sam, Josh and Karen in one and O'Hara, Murphy, and Rivers in the other.

Sam and the group find the nest of one of the creatures, but Josh steals one of the eggs and accidentally drops it on a rock and is killed by the creature "mommy." O'Hara and the group find water, but Rivers fails when he tries to blow up one of the creatures in the stream, which soon kills him. Karen decides to check out the smart video on the planet. Murphy is killed by the creature "mommy" Sam distracts her for O'Hara to get the machine from the nest but fails and takes an egg from the nest. The creature soon notices; Sam picks up the egg and lures the creature into an "endless hole;" the creature dropping into it along with the egg. O'Hara fixes the machine. Karen arrives at the scene but discovers that it was just a tower brought with the machine explosion, soon is killed by the creature. Dane O'Hara returns to their dimension, where the place is full of police and ambulances.

== Cast ==
- Joe Flanigan as Colonel Sam Synn
- Sam O'Mahony as Josh Burk
- John Rhys-Davies as Senator Jackson Crenshaw
- Catherine Walker as Dr. Karen Fast
- Yare Jegbefume as Lieutenant Rivers
- Chris Newman as Private Jordan Reid
- Dagmar Döring as Dr. Jillian O'Hara
- Rob Soohan as Brian Murphy
- Kevin Flood as Lex Michaels
- Shashi Rami as Al Icia

== Production ==
Ferocious Planet was filmed in Ireland.

== Home media ==
Ferocious Planet was released on DVD on July 5, 2011. It was also released in the UK under the title Star Gate on September 15, 2014.
