= Patrick Galvin =

Irish poet

- Born: 15 August 1927; Cork, Ireland
- Died: 10 May 2011 (aged 83); Cork, Ireland
- Occupations: Poet, Dramatist
- Writing career
- Notable works: Song for a Raggy Boy (1990), Christ in London (1960), Cry the Believers (1960), We Do It For Love (1975)

Patrick Galvin (15 August 1927 – 10 May 2011) was an Irish poet, singer, playwright, and prose and screenwriter born in Cork's inner city.

== Biography ==
Galvin was born in Cork in 1927 at a time of great political transition in Ireland. His mother was a Republican and his father a Free Stater which gave rise to ongoing political tension within the household and later informed his well-loved poem "My Father Spoke with Swans" and his autobiographical memoir Song For a Poor Boy. An autodidact, he came to know and love literature through the Russian, French and Irish classics. His early poetry shows the influences of Gaelic poetry whilst his later poetry reflects more international rhythms and themes. He had grown up during the time of the Spanish Civil War, influenced by his mother's Republican politics and later discovered a great affinity with the Andalusian poet, Federico García Lorca; these influences are evident in his epic poem about Michael Collins, 'The White Monument'. His childhood ended dramatically when he was sent to Daingean Industrial School, noted for its abuse of young people in its care. This experience had a powerful influence on his earlier poetry which expresses the fear and brutality of that time:

Come fifteen now, the flogging belt, the prison cell,
The cruel days, the friendships hanged and cold,
The dead beat of winter and the hungry bell,
The very young are battered and grow old.
And every day they stand about and watch and stare,
The shaven heads, the broken ribs, the iron rod.
And every night they weep an empty eye
And curse the hand that killed Almighty God.

In his prose memoir Song For a Raggy Boy he contextualises those experiences within the Europe of the Second World War. Irritated by Ireland's neutral stance he joined the Royal Air Force in 1943. His anti-war memoir Song for a Flyboy from 2003 records his war experiences and his play The Devil’s Own People from 1976 denounces Ireland's neutrality in the face of fascism and the Holocaust.

After the breakdown of his first marriage, at the age of 21, he went on to establish himself as a folksinger, songwriter and collector, recording nine volumes of folk songs as well as publishing Irish Songs of Resistance 1798 -1922. He travelled widely during this period going behind the ‘Iron Curtain’ to East Germany as a troubadour. These experiences marked his work and his personal life. He began to publish poetry in many leading English and Irish journals and he co-founded and edited the literary magazine Chanticleer. His first collection of poetry Heart of Grace, 1957 was closely followed by the second Christ in London, 1960. At that time he was also in the process of establishing himself as a playwright in London and Dublin where his work was closely monitored by the Catholic Church hierarchy in Ireland, which found that his play Cry the Believers was not one "to which young, impressionable minds could be exposed without risk to faith". He was given the reputation of being the "Enfant terrible of the Irish Theatre" by one Irish critic. He came back to Ireland in the 1960s but, unable to adapt to the conservatism of that time, he returned to London and spent intervals abroad in Israel.

In 1973 he returned to Ireland, this time to Belfast as Writer in Residence at the Lyric Theatre. It also saw the publication of his third collection of poetry The Woodburners. That period of time with the Lyric Theatre established Galvin firmly as an exciting dramatist. His groundbreaking play We Do It For Love (the first satire about "the Troubles") broke all box office records for an Irish play at the Lyric. Through his work there he was influential in inspiring a new generation of writers in Northern Ireland. His final play at the Lyric, My Silver Bird, was an operetta based on the life and times of Grace O’Malley, dramatically culminating in the battle of Kinsale and the fall of the Gaelic order. The score was composed by Peadar O Riada. The play was first staged the night after Bobby Sands died and due to the prevailing political climate, it was prevented from travelling to and showing at Cork Opera House as scheduled.

Galvin later went to live in Spain where he completed his fourth collection of poetry Folktales for the General. He returned to Cork in the 1980s and he began to work on his memoirs Song for a Poor Boy, Song For a Raggy Boy and Song for a Flyboy. In 1997 he wrote the screenplay for Song For a Raggy Boy which got its world premiere at Cork Film Festival in 2003.

Patrick was Writer in Residence with East Midlands Arts (UK), DunLaoghaire Rathdown Council, Portlaoise Prison and finally with University College Cork where he was awarded a Doctorate of Literature in 2006. Galvin cofounded the 'Poetry Now Festival', which went on to become Ireland's leading poetry festival. With his wife Mary Johnson he co-founded the Munster Literature Centre in Cork which has given birth to the Frank O'Connor Festival and to the 'Frank O'Connor International Short Story Award, one of the largest in the world.

Throughout his life, he adapted his own work and other works for both BBC radio and RTÉ radio. He travelled widely giving readings of both his prose and poetry, much of which is recorded in the Library of Congress in Washington. In 1984 he was elected to Aosdána. Patrick suffered a stroke in 2003. In spite of this, in 2005, the year of the City of Culture Cork, he co-translated the collection of poetry 'Everything But You' from the original poetry of Turkish poet, Yilmaz Odabashi.

Latterly the constraints of his lengthy illness and his inability to give creative expression to his thoughts on the current state of Ireland, with its culture of greed, exploitation and refusal to deal with systematic physical and sexual clerical abuse, contributed greatly to his demise.

== Personal life ==
Galvin was married four times, divorced three times, and had three sons and two daughters. He had one daughter, Christine Bygraves, from his first marriage. He was next married to Stella Jackson, and then for 27 years to Diana Ferrier (divorced 1978), with whom he had two sons, author Patrick Newley (died 2009) and film director Liam Galvin. His last marriage was to Mary Johnson, with whom he had a daughter, Grainne, and a son, Macdara. His widow died a few months after his death.

== Selected works ==
=== Music history ===
- Irish Songs of Resistance, Worker's Music Association 1955

=== Prose and poetry ===
- Heart of Grace, Linden Press 1957
- Christ in London, Linden Press 1960
- Five Cork Poets, Mercier Press 1970
- Letter to a British Soldier on Irish Soil 1972
- The Wood Burners, New Writers Press, Dublin 1973
- The Prisoners of the Tower, Cork University Press 1979
- Man on the Porch, 1979 (Martin Brien & O'Keeffe (ISBN 0-85616-161-6)
- Folk Tales for the General, Raven Arts Press, Dublin, 1989
- Song for a Poor Boy, Raven Arts Press, Dublin 1990,
- Song For a Raggy Boy, Raven Arts Press, Dublin 1991
- The Death of Art O'Leary, 1994
- New and Selected Poems, Cork University Press, 1996
- The Raggy Boy Trilogy, New Island Books, Dublin 2002

=== Plays ===
- And Him Stretched, 1961 Unity Theatre London
- Cry The Believers, 1962 Eblana Theatre, Dublin
- And Him Stretched, 1962 Eblana Theatre, Dublin
- Boy in the Smoke, 1965 BBC Wednesday Play
- Nightfall to Belfast, 1973 Lyric Theatre, Belfast
- The Last Burning, 1974 Lyric Theatre, Belfast
- We Do It For Love, 1975 Lyric Theatre, Belfast
- The Devil's Own People, 1976 Gaiety Theatre, Dublin
- The Class of '39, 1980 BBC Radio 4
- My Silver Bird, 1981 Lyric Theatre, Belfast
- City Child, Come Trailing Home, 1983, RTÉ Radio
- Landscape and Seascape, 1983, RTÉ Radio
- Quartet for Nightown, 1984, RTÉ Radio
- Wolfe, 1984, RTÉ Radio
- The Cage, 2006, Cork Arts Theatre, Cork
