= Vivarium (film) =

2019 film by Lorcan Finnegan

- Release poster
- Directed by: Lorcan Finnegan
- Screenplay by: Garret Shanley
- Story by: Garret Shanley; Lorcan Finnegan
- Produced by: John McDonnell; Brendan McCarthy
- Starring: Imogen Poots; Jesse Eisenberg
- Cinematography: MacGregor
- Edited by: Tony Cranstoun
- Music by: Kristian Eidnes Andersen
- Production companies: XYZ Films; Fantastic Films; Frakas Productions; PingPong Film; VOO; BeTV
- Distributed by: Vertigo Releasing (Ireland); VOOmotion (Belgium); Angel Films (Denmark)
- Release dates: 18 May 2019 (Cannes); 26 March 2020 (Ireland); 10 April 2020 (Belgium); 7 May 2020 (Denmark)
- Running time: 98 minutes
- Countries: Ireland; Belgium; Denmark
- Language: English
- Budget: €4 million
- Box office: $487,625

Vivarium is a 2019 science fiction psychological thriller film directed by Lorcan Finnegan, from a story by Finnegan and Garret Shanley. Shanley also wrote the screenplay. An international co-production of Ireland, Denmark and Belgium, it stars Imogen Poots, Jesse Eisenberg, Jonathan Aris, and Éanna Hardwicke.

The film follows a couple (Eisenberg and Poots) who are forced to care for a mysterious humanoid creature while trapped in a strange, vivarium-like neighbourhood. It had its world premiere at the Cannes Film Festival on 18 May 2019, and was released in Ireland on 27 March 2020 by Vertigo Releasing.

== Plot ==
Primary school teacher Gemma and her boyfriend Tom, a landscaper, visit a housing development called Yonder, where all the homes appear identical. They are shown house number 9 by an unusual real estate agent named Martin, who unsettlingly mimics Gemma's answer after asking if they have children. During a tour of number 9, Martin disappears without explanation. Gemma and Tom attempt to leave the development but inexplicably end up going back to house 9, after which the couple drives through the seemingly endless, identical streets until eventually running out of fuel.

Gemma and Tom sleep in the house and attempt to escape on foot but repeatedly return to the same house. Outside, they find a box containing vacuum-sealed, flavorless food. Tom sets the house on fire and the couple sleeps on the pavement. By morning, however, the fire has left no damage, and a new box appears, this time containing a baby boy and a message instructing them to raise the child in order to be released.

After 98 days, the child has grown rapidly to the size of a ten-year-old, mimicking Tom and Gemma and shrieking when hungry. When it calls Gemma "Mother", she denies the role, while Tom refers to the child as "it". The couple waits in the garden with a pickaxe to ambush whoever is delivering the food and taking away the trash, but no one appears. Tom begins digging a hole in the garden while growing withdrawn. Meanwhile, the boy watches abstract, fractal-like patterns on television.

Tom locks the boy in their car in hopes of luring whoever is responsible. However, Gemma takes pity and releases the boy. Tom continues digging and begins sleeping in the hole. One day, the boy disappears and returns with a strange book filled with symbols and drawings of humanoid figures with throat sacs. When Gemma asks him to mimic the person who gave him the book, he makes rasping sounds and inflates his own throat sacs while his eyes roll back in his head, much to Gemma's disturbance.

The boy matures to resemble a young adult and Tom becomes ill. The boy leaves each day and Gemma tries to follow him but always finds herself back at number 9. Tom continues to dig and finds a corpse in a vacuum bag. The boy locks Gemma and Tom out of the house. Gemma pleads with the boy for medicine for Tom but is denied. Tom dies and the boy zips him into a vacuum bag and throws it into the hole.

At her breaking point, Gemma wounds the boy with the pickaxe. The boy hisses and crawls to the sidewalk, lifts it by the edge, and crawls under it into a labyrinth beneath the sidewalk. Gemma follows and slides down the hallway as if gravity has shifted direction, crashes through a door into what seems like an alternate reality, then into multiple similar realities and rooms in other houses with more boys and several strangers, one of whom is dead.

She lands back in number 9, weak and moaning. The boy is cleaning the house. He carries her to a vacuum bag explaining that mothers die after raising their sons. She dies as he zips her in. The boy buries her with Tom, and the grass reforms over the defect. He drives back to the real estate office, where an aged Martin lies dying. Martin gives the boy his name tag and dies. The boy zips Martin into a vacuum bag and puts him into a garbage chute disguised as a file drawer. When a couple walks in the door, the boy greets them just as Martin did.

== Cast ==
- Imogen Poots as Gemma
- Jesse Eisenberg as Tom
- Jonathan Aris as Martin
- Danielle Ryan as School Mom
- Molly McCann as Molly
- Senan Jennings as Young Boy
- Éanna Hardwicke as Older Boy
- Côme Thiry as Baby

== Production ==
In May 2018, it was announced that Lorcan Finnegan would direct Vivarium from a story he co-wrote with Garret Shanley, and that Jesse Eisenberg and Imogen Poots had joined the cast. It was shot in locations in Belgium and Ireland before moving to Ardmore Studios in Wicklow, Ireland.

== Release ==
Vivarium had its world premiere in the Critics' Week section of the Cannes Film Festival on 18 May 2019. Shortly afterwards, Vertigo Releasing acquired distribution rights to the film in the UK and Ireland, while the US rights were acquired by Saban Capital Group for distribution through its division, Saban Films. It was released simultaneously in select cinemas and on digital platforms in the United Kingdom, Ireland and the United States on 27 March 2020. In Belgium, it was released on premium video on demand on VOOmotion on 10 April 2020. Distributed by Angel Films, the film was released on the streaming service Blockbuster in Denmark on 7 May 2020.

== Reception ==
On the review aggregator website Rotten Tomatoes, Vivarium holds an approval rating of 72% based on 149 reviews, with an average rating of 6.6/10. The website's critics consensus reads, "Vivarium may confound almost as often as it intrigues, but this well-acted sci-fi/horror hybrid has interesting ideas—and explores them with style." On Metacritic, the film has weighted average score of 64 out of 100 based on reviews from 23 critics, indicating "generally favorable" reviews.

Glenn Kenny of The New York Times wrote: "The movie expands upon its echoes of the classic TV series The Prisoner with admirable purposefulness. And its commitment to the inexorable horrors of its story line is actually surprising. (The sci-fi angle of the story is suggested by its title.) There's a consistent inventiveness — and grim humor — to this treatment of a seemingly well-worn theme." Owen Gleiberman of Variety mentioned: "Vivarium isn't a comedy of dehumanization; it's a starkly minimalist sci-fi parable of dehumanization. But the movie leaves the audience every bit as numb as the characters are supposed to be." Simon Abrams of RogerEbert.com added "Every moment in Vivarium is a frustrating synecdoche, since no single metaphor or image convey an idea that you probably couldn't think up with yourself during an especially foul mood... Vivarium is the horror movie equivalent of Andy Warhol's Campbell's soup cans: easy to reproduce, easier to forget." Peter Bradshow of The Guardian stated: "Vivarium is a lab-rat experiment of a film, with flat, facetious humour and a single insidious joke maintained and developed with monomaniacal intensity. In its way, this film is an emblem of postnatal depression and simple loneliness."
