= Chris Newman (actor) =

Irish actor (born 1988)

- Born: 16 December 1987 (age 37); Swords, Dublin, Ireland
- Occupation: Actor
- Years active: 2003–present

Christopher Newman (born 16 December 1987) is an Irish actor with roles in films Song for a Raggy Boy and Perrier's Bounty and TV series The Clinic, Love is the Drug, Stardust, Love/Hate and Red Rock.

== Early life ==
Newman began attending the Billie Barry Stage School at age five. Although the school focused mainly on dance, it introduced him to being on stage. When he was thirteen, he auditioned six times for Aisling Walsh's feature film, Song for a Raggy Boy, before eventually being cast in the role of Patrick Delaney.

== Career ==
In 2003, Newman landed a role in the TV series, The Clinic, alongside a young Saoirse Ronan, who played his sister. For the next few years, he juggled school work with roles in Love is the Drug, Stardust and Aisling's Diary. In 2009, he undertook a role in the crime-drama Love/Hate. In 2010, Newman had a small part in the comedy gangster film, Perrier's Bounty, starring Cillian Murphy, Brendan Gleeson and Jim Broadbent before working with Joe Flanigan and John Rhys-Davies on the sci-fi TV movie, Ferocious Planet. In 2012 he played William Kelly, an assistant electrician in Saving the Titanic alongside Andrew Simpson, his co-star in Song for a Raggy Boy. Chris Newman made his debut in the Abbey Theatre in February with two twenty-minute plays about love, life and relationships called Love in a Glass Jar and Ribbons. In 2013 he appeared in Quirke. Since 2015, Newman has played the corrupt Detective Rory Walsh in Red Rock.

Newman appeared in a documentary for Irish television, Hollywood Trials, in 2008 and appeared in a video for Irish band No Roller's debut single "Ocean". His first taste of theatre was when he took the lead role in Chatroom.

== Filmography ==
- (2002) Incredible Story Studio – Max
- (2003) Song for a Raggy Boy – Patrick Delaney 743
- (2002–2003) Fair City – Michael Glavin (14 episodes)
- (2003) The Clinic – Tommy Geraghty (4 episodes)
- (2004) Love is the Drug – Mark Kirwin
- (2006) Stardust – John Jr.
- (2008–2009) Aisling's Diary – Murphy
- (2009) Perrier's Bounty – Teen Joyrider
- (2010) Mariana – Tony/Young Pavel
- (2010) Love/Hate – Robbie Treacy
- (2011) Ferocious Planet – Pvt. Jordan Reid
- (2012) Saving the Titanic – William Kelly
- (2012) Trivia – Denis
- (2012) Rapture
- (2013) The Food Guide to Love – Waiter
- (2014) Quirke – Rugby fan
- (2014) Jack and Ralph Plan a Murder – Pat
- (2014) Shooting for Socrates – Norman Whiteside
- (2015) Roy – Zach Morgan
- (2015–2020) Red Rock – Detective Garda Rory Walsh
- (2016) Eden – Posh kid
- (2016) A Dangerous Fortune – David Greenbourne
- (2016) A Date for Mad Mary – Guy on train
- (2016) The Legend of Harry and Ambrose – Seáneen
- (2020) Here Are the Young Men – Dwayne Kearney
