= Wake Wood =

2011 film

- Theatrical release poster
- Directed by: David Keating
- Written by: David Keating; Brendan McCarthy
- Produced by: John McDonnell; Brendan McCarthy; Magnus Paulsson
- Starring: Timothy Spall; Aidan Gillen; Eva Birthistle; Ella Connolly; Ruth McCabe; Amelia Crowley
- Cinematography: Chris Maris
- Edited by: Tim Murrell
- Music by: Michael Convertino
- Distributed by: Hammer Film Productions; Spitfire Pictures; Fantastic Films; Vertigo Films
- Release dates: 25 September 2009 (LIFFF); 25 March 2011
- Running time: 90 minutes
- Countries: Ireland; United Kingdom
- Language: English
- Box office: £1,251

Wake Wood (sometimes marketed as The Wake Wood) is a 2009 Irish supernatural horror film directed by David Keating and starring Timothy Spall, Eva Birthistle, Ella Connolly and Aidan Gillen. An international co-production between Ireland and the United Kingdom by Hammer Film Productions, the film is set in Donegal, Ireland. The story revolves around a grieving couple, Patrick and Louise, who move to a rural village after the tragic death of their daughter, Alice. They encounter strange rituals led by Arthur, a veterinary colleague, that can bring the dead back to life for three days.

== Plot ==
The film opens to little Alice Daley celebrating her ninth birthday with her parents Patrick, a veterinarian, and Louise, a pharmacist. Before leaving for school, Patrick presents her a pet hamster, while Louise presents her a necklace. On her way home from school, Alice visits a German Shepherd dog in the yard of her father's veterinary practice. Without warning, the dog mauls Alice. Patrick and Louise find their daughter, but are too late to her as she succumbs to her injuries and dies.

After her death, Patrick and Louise relocate to a rural village called Wakewood, where they struggle to cope with the loss of their only child (Louise cannot have any more children). The couple's car mysteriously breaks down one evening, and they go to the nearby house of Patrick's veterinary colleague, Arthur, to seek help. There Louise witnesses Arthur leading a strange and bloody pagan ritual but refuses to say anything to Patrick. It becomes apparent that something strange is happening in town and that Arthur knows that Louise saw the ritual.

Soon afterwards a farmer, Mick O'Shea, is accidentally killed by his own bull. Horrified, Louise and Patrick witness the accident, and decide to leave town, but Arthur, who needs their skills (and presumably doesn't want Louise telling what she saw), convinces them to stay by explaining that he has a ritual that brings back the dead, but only for three days, only within the boundaries of the townland, and only if the person has been dead for less than a year. This is the ritual that Louise witnessed. The couple agree to remain, excited to see their only child again.

The ritual requires a piece of the person to be resurrected, and the couple go grave-robbing, cutting off one of Alice's fingers and retrieving her necklace (from the opening scene). The ritual also requires a fresh corpse. At Mick's wake, Arthur asks his widow, Peggy, for permission to use his body, but she refuses, claiming there is something not right about the couple. However, Arthur persuades her by tacitly threatening her that if she refuses he will not resurrect Mick either.

The gruesome ritual goes ahead and Alice is reborn. However, Peggy is still not happy and frightens the little girl, who flees across the townland boundary. As soon as she does so, she collapses, with the wounds that killed her appearing on her body. Her parents immediately take her back across the boundary and the wounds disappear. That night Arthur and other villagers come to see them, claiming that something is wrong and Alice must be sent back to her grave immediately. Patrick and Louise persuade them to allow her to stay for the final day.

However, Patrick soon realises that there is something seriously wrong with Alice, who begins killing and mutilating animals. She also tells Louise that she is pregnant, which Louise confirms with a pregnancy test. Alice then murders Peggy and several other villagers before Patrick manages to sedate her. Her parents and the villagers carry her to the woods, where they bury her. Patrick and Louise admit that she has actually been dead for over a year, which has caused her to react in the way she has. As Louise turns to leave, Alice drags her mother down into the grave with her, the penalty for misuse of the ritual.

Sometime later, Arthur resurrects a heavily pregnant Louise. At home, Patrick and Louise talk about the unborn child. Later, in the final scene, Patrick lays out surgical tools.

== Cast ==
- Aidan Gillen as Patrick Daley
- Eva Birthistle as Louise Daley
- Timothy Spall as Arthur
- Ella Connolly as Alice Daley
- Ruth McCabe as Peggy O'Shea
- Amelia Crowley as Mary Brogan
- Brian Gleeson as Martin O'Shea
- Dan Gordon as Mick O'Shea
- Aoife Meagher as Deirdre
- Tommy McArdle as Tommy
- John McArdle as Ben

== Production ==
Wake Wood was filmed in County Donegal, Ireland, and in Österlen, Scania, Sweden. The selection of Sweden as a shooting location was because of David Keating's love for the Swedish horror film Frostbite. Keating wished to work with the people behind the film, and he hired Chris Maris (the cinematographer on Frostbite) to shoot Wake Wood and Magnus Paulsson (Frostbite's producer) as co-producer. It was the first theatrical release from genre production company Hammer Films in thirty years. The film premiered at the 2009 Lund International Fantastic Film Festival in Sweden. It was released theatrically in UK cinemas on 25 March 2011 and it was released three days later on DVD in the UK on 28 March.

== Release ==
The film received a limited domestic release opening at four cinemas grossing £1,251 for the weekend of 25–27 March 2011.

=== Home media ===
Momentum Pictures produced the Region 2 DVD that came out in March 2011. Dark Sky Films released the Region 1 DVD and Blu-ray Disc in June 2011.

== Reception ==
As of June 2020, Wake Wood holds an 80% approval rating on Rotten Tomatoes, based on 25 reviews with an average rating of 6.62/10.

Peter Bradshaw reviewed the film for The Guardian and gave it 4 stars out of five, suggesting the film is "in the tradition of Don't Look Now, The Wicker Man and the communal nightmares of Ira Levin; it's a low-budget film that entertainingly takes its audience to the brink of pure absurdity. But it also riffs nastily and effectively on ideas of taboo, on our perennial yearning for ceremony and ritual to alleviate the sadness of life, and on Larkin's idea that what's truly scary is not dying but being dead."

Tony Vilgotsky of Russian horror webzine Darker gave the film 4.5 stars out of 5. He mentioned that, in his opinion, Wake Wood includes some references to Lucio Fulci's film City of the Living Dead.

== Novelisation ==
A novelisation of the film was written by K. A. John and published by Hammer Books in association with the Random House Group in 2011, ISBN 978-0-09-955618-3.

== See also ==
Pet Sematary, a book by Stephen King, later made into a 1989 film and a 2019 film, which has a similar plot.
