= Woken =

2023 Irish-Italian film

- Directed by: Alan Friel
- Screenplay by: Alan Friel
- Produced by: Brendan McCarthy; John McDonnell; Deirdre Levins; Marina Marzotto; Mattia Oddone
- Starring: Erin Kellyman; Maxine Peake
- Cinematography: Richard Kendrick
- Edited by: Breege Rowley, Chris Gill & Manuel Grieco
- Production companies: Fantastic Films; Propaganda Italia; Rocliffe Ltd.; Bankside Films
- Distributed by: Blue Swan Entertainment (Italy)
- Release dates: 29 October 2023 (Trieste Science+Fiction Festival); 1 March 2024 (DIFF); 4 July 2024 (Italy)
- Running time: 90mins
- Countries: Ireland; Italy
- Languages: English; Italian; Irish

Woken is a 2023 dystopian science fiction thriller film starring Erin Kellyman and Maxine Peake. It is written and directed by Alan Friel in his feature length directorial debut.

== Synopsis ==
Anna is being nursed to health by Helen and Peter on a remote island in the North Sea after waking up with no memory, pregnant, and in the middle of a worldwide pandemic. She is told that James is her husband and that they arrived on the island after travelling from the mainland, although the reason for their trip is not revealed. Anna is shown photographs and videos to help her recall the events and is treated by Doctor Henry but continues to suffer from amnesia. After James kills two visitors from the mainland who were visibly suffering from the virus, Anna is quarantined and visited by the doctor to determine if she and her baby have been infected. Helen and James admit they concealed the truth from her to prevent unnecessary stress. Anna attempts to escape, evading capture from Peter and Helen, but discovers Joshua, a young boy who angrily recognises Anna. Helen claims Joshua is her own son despite a physical resemblance to Anna. Helen appears willing to reveal the truth of the situation but James arrives and drugs Anna, who wakes up in a laboratory. It is revealed that Anna is a clone developed by Peter and Helen, who are scientists working for the military to develop humans immune to the virus. James is a soldier whose role was to aid and assist the clone. Anna escapes the lab but Peter is accidentally killed in the process. Anna returns to the cottage and, holding Helen at gunpoint, has her tie up James and reveal the truth; after 96 attempts, this version of Anna is immune to the virus. Joshua is the son of a previous Anna who Helen adopted. If Anna's baby is also immune, the scientists will have successfully saved the human race although Helen claims the military want to sell the results to the highest bidder. She agrees to help Anna escape to the Northern Islands, which are rumoured to be virus-free, but they are captured by soldiers led by Doctor Henry. After Anna gives birth, Doctor Henry tests the baby's immunity and confirms she is unaffected by the virus. He prepares to leave the island, taking the baby with him while the soldiers kill Joshua after he tries to escape. Distraught at his death, Helen resolves to aid Anna in recovering her baby and they kill the remaining soldiers, including James. Tricked into thinking James and Helen are dead, Doctor Henry captures Anna and prepares to depart the island by boat. However, he is killed by Helen, allowing Anna to board the boat and recover her daughter. She and Helen then set sail in the direction of the Northern Islands to start a new life.

== Cast ==
- Erin Kellyman as Anna
- Maxine Peake as Helen
- Ivanno Jeremiah as James
- Corrado Invernizzi as Peter
- Peter McDonald as Doctor Henry
- Oscar Coleman as Joshua

== Production ==
Friel and Peake previously worked together on his short film Cake. The film is produced by Fantastic Films and Propaganda Italia. Screen Ireland awarded €700,000 funding to the project. Filming took place in April 2022 on Fanore Beach in County Clare. Bankside Films are handling international sales for the project. Filming wrapped in June 2022 after 5 weeks, filming also took place at the University of Limerick. The film has support from the Italian Ministry of Culture. Prosthetics and SFX make-up are overseen by Chiara Bartoli, visual effects by Giuseppe Squillaci, with post-production being handled in Italy. Robbie Ryan is handling the photography and Tony Kearns the editing. The film's production is by Stephen Kelliher on behalf of Bankside Films, and Brendan McCarthy, John McDonnell and Deirdre Levins for Fantastic Films, and by Marina Marzotto and Mattia Oddone for Propaganda Italia. Stephen Kelliher and Sophie Green are Executive Producers for Bankside Films. Phil Hunt and Compton Ross are acting as Executive Producers for Head Gear Films with Niamh Fagan as Executive Producer for Screen Ireland.

== Release ==
Woken had its Italian Premiere in Méliès competition at the Trieste Science+Fiction Festival on 29 October 2023.

The film was screened at the Dublin International Film Festival on 1 March 2024, and was released in Italy on 4 July 2024 by Blue Swan Entertainment.
