= Amelia Crowley =

Irish actress

- Born: Dublin, Ireland
- Occupations: Actor, comedian
- Years active: 1995–present
- Known for: Fair City (Fiona Piggott), Derry Girls (Deirdre Mallon)
- Notable work: I Went Down (1997), Ella Enchanted (2004), Wake Wood (2009), The Man Who Invented Christmas (2017), Fair City (TV series), Derry Girls (TV series)
- Television: Fair City, Derry Girls, Val Falvey, TD, Little Women, Finbar’s Class, Dublin Murders.
- Spouse: Anthony Brophy
- Children: 2

Amelia Crowley is an Irish actress and stand-up comedian from Dublin. She is best known for her television roles, including Fiona Piggott in RTÉ’s soap opera Fair City and Deirdre Mallon in the Channel 4 comedy series Derry Girls. Crowley has also appeared in films such as I Went Down, Ella Enchanted, Wake Wood, and The Man Who Invented Christmas, and has worked extensively in Irish and UK theatre.

== Career ==
Crowley has made film appearances in I Went Down and Ella Enchanted.

In 2001, Crowley played Yvonn in RTÉ Two's sitcom, The Cassidys. In 2007, Crowley joined the cast of Fair City playing husband-murderer, Fiona Piggott, a love interest for Paul Brennan. She left the soap in 2011, but returned in 2020.

== Filmography ==
- I Went Down, 1997
- Ella Enchanted Fairy Administrator, 2004
- Wake Wood, 2009
- The Man Who Invented Christmas, 2017

=== Television ===
- Finbar's Class, Lorraine, 1995
- Val Falvey, TD, 2005
- Dublin Murders, 2019
- Derry Girls, Deirdre Mallon, 2018–2022

== Theatre work ==
- F! Riverbank theatre, Dublin 1993
- Twenty Grand Peacock Theatre 1998
- Car Show, Car Show 2 Meeting House Square 1998-2000
- The Star Trap Bewley's Café 2002
- The Plough and the Stars
- Podge And Rodge Live Vicar Street 2006
- Little Gem Bush Theatre 2010
- The Cavalcaders Druid Theatre 2022

== Personal life ==
Crowley is married to author and fellow actor Anthony Brophy. They have two children.
