= Neasa Hardiman =

Irish director

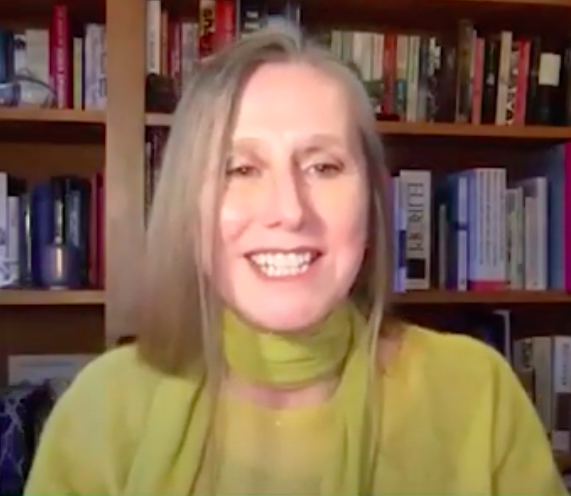
- Neasa Hardiman in 2022
- Born: Ireland
- Occupations: Director; screenwriter
- Years active: 1998–present

Neasa Hardiman is an Irish director of both fiction and nonfiction, predominantly known for her television work.

Hardiman began her career producing a number of shows for the RTÉ network in Ireland and has since worked on both British and American productions. Her television credits include the children's drama series Tracy Beaker Returns (2010–2012), the crime dramas Scott & Bailey (2014) and Happy Valley (2016), the American period drama Z: The Beginning of Everything and the Marvel superhero series Inhumans (both 2017).

== Biography ==
=== Early life ===
Neasa is the youngest of five, including composer Ronan Hardiman. Her parents were Rosaleen (Thornton) and Thomas. Thomas was the Director General of RTÉ between 1968 and 1975. She grew up in Donnybrook, Dublin.

=== Education and early career ===
Hardiman holds a number of degrees including a Double First (First Class Honours and First Place) Bachelor of Design from the National College of Art and Design in Dublin. A fluent German speaker, Hardiman earned a master's degree in visual communications from the Universität der Künste (University of the Arts) in Berlin. Subsequently, Hardiman completed a master's degree in Aesthetics and Politics from the NCAD Dublin and a PhD in Film Studies from Trinity College Dublin.

She was hired as a graphic designer at RTÉ in the early 1990s. In 1995, Hardiman designed the broadcaster's current logo. After winning a contest held inside RTÉ, she was trained to become a producer-director. In 1998 Hardiman became the youngest ever director of the Irish soap opera Fair City, which airs on the RTÉ network in Ireland. Hardiman's early work with RTÉ also included producing and directing more than twenty documentaries and a number of entertainment shows including the Irish broadcast of the Eurovision Song Contest. In 2004, Hardiman was one of the directors of Imagining Ulysses, a documentary film that aimed to explores the themes of James Joyce's seminal novel, whilst remaining accessible to a contemporary audience. Imagining Ulysses was nominated for Best Documentary at the 2nd Irish Film and Television Awards in 2004, won the award for Best Documentary at the Chicago International Film Festival and the award for Best Arts Documentary at the Celtic Film and Television Festival.

=== 2010–present ===
Hardiman worked as a lead director on the BBC's children's drama series Tracy Beaker Returns which was transmitted between 2010 and 2012. The Tracy Beaker Returns production team won the British Academy Children's Awards for Best Drama in 2010 and earned further nominations in both 2011 and 2012. Hardiman was approached to direct the series by producer Gina Cronk — who like Hardiman, had never worked on the production of a children's drama series. In 2010, discussing how the Tracy Beaker Returns team approached "a narrative specifically for children" Hardiman noted that the production team wanted to take on "serious subjects [and] make a kind of "Play for Today" for children, leavened with some humour". Subsequently, Hardiman directed four episodes of the BBC1 hospital drama Holby City which aired between 2012 and 2013, and two episodes of its loosely connected sister show, Casualty which aired in 2013. She felt working on Holby City to be "fantastic" describing the series as "emotional, ethical dilemmas, politics, power struggles, all human life". In December 2013 it was announced that Hardiman would direct In the Club, a new drama series written by Kay Mellor.

After completing work on In The Club, Hardiman was approached to direct the two-part finale (2014) of the ITV1 crime drama Scott & Bailey, also produced by Red Production Company. Hardiman felt the Scott & Bailey differentiated itself from standard police procedurals in so far as it was "noir-ish" "gritty" and possessed "a very consistent and specific voice" which she felt to be close to her own aesthetic approach to storytelling. Hardiman also appreciated working on a show that was female-led, yet not thematically dominated by the gender of its protagonists. She described series leads Lesley Sharp and Suranne Jones as "actors at the top of their game" and appreciated their willingness to experiment with her ideas.

In August 2015 Red Production Company and the BBC announced that Hardiman would direct the second series of Happy Valley (2016) alongside writer, executive producer and series creator Sally Wainwright. Tim Goodman of The Hollywood Reporter praised the direction of both Hardiman and Wainwright, noting that their heavy use of close-ups helped bind viewers to the fate of series protagonist Catherine Cawood (Sarah Lancashire). In 2016 she won the Irish Film and Television Award for Best Director for her work on the 2nd series of Happy Valley. In 2017 Happy Valley was awarded the British Academy Television Award for Best Drama Series, with the accolade attributed to Wainwright, Hardiman, Nicola Shindler (executive producer) and Juliet Charlesworth (producer).

In 2017 Hardiman directed two episodes of Z: The Beginning of Everything, an American period drama series created for Amazon Studios that presents a fictionalized account of the life of American socialite, Zelda Fitzgerald. For her direction on Z: The Beginning of Everything Hardiman earned a nomination for Best Director at the 2017 Irish Film and Television Awards. Subsequently, Hardiman was approached by an executive producer to direct the finale of Peabody winning Marvel superhero series, Jessica Jones which was filmed in New York City New York. In spite of the difference in genre, Hardiman found the experience of filming Jessica Jones similar to her previous work, noting that both Happy Valley and Z: The Theory of Everything were expressed using fully cinematic narrative techniques.

In January 2017 it was announced that Hardiman has received a production loan from the Irish Film Board to make her feature film directorial debut with the self-written script Sea Fever. Sea Fever is described a science-fiction thriller set off the coast of Ireland, and depicts a group of fishermen along with a science student who are threatened by a deadly water-based parasite. The concept had previously earned Hardiman the award for Best First Feature Screenplay prize at the London Film Awards. She described the project as being about "trust", "interdependence" and "belief". In June 2017 Hardiman disclosed that she had also received funding from Creative Europe, and stated that the film was ready to enter production. Sea Fever is the first project Hardiman has directed in her native Ireland in over 10 years.
