= Outcast (2010 film) =

- UK release poster
- Directed by: Colm McCarthy
- Written by: Colm McCarthy; Tom McCarthy
- Produced by: John McDonnell; Brendan McCarthy
- Starring: James Nesbitt; Kate Dickie; James Cosmo; Niall Bruton; Hannah Stanbridge; Karen Gillan
- Music by: Giles Packham
- Distributed by: Vertigo Films
- Release date: 12 March 2010 (SXSW)
- Running time: 98 minutes
- Country: United Kingdom
- Language: English

Outcast is a 2010 British supernatural horror thriller film directed by Colm McCarthy and starring James Nesbitt.

== Plot ==
Cathal (James Nesbitt) is a killer who is pursuing his former lover Mary (Kate Dickie). Mary, a woman who comes from an ancient and magical Celtic race, and her son Fergal (Niall Bruton) hide in an outlying district of Edinburgh and use magic to protect themselves, but Cathal is determined to outsmart them. Local residents begin to die at the hands of an unidentified force, but it is unknown if Cathal is the killer, or if is he trying to destroy the beast.

== Cast ==
- James Nesbitt as Cathal
- Kate Dickie as Mary
- Niall Bruton as Fergal
- Hanna Stanbridge as Petronella
- Ciarán McMenamin as Liam
- James Cosmo as Laird
- Ian Whyte as The Beast
- Karen Gillan as Ally
- Daniel Portman as Paul
- Therese Bradley as Jitta
- Josh Whitelaw as Tomatsk
- Claire Catterson as Susan
- Sean McCarthy as Old Hands
- Christine Tremarco as Housing Officer
- Christopher Downie as Police Officer #1

== Release ==
The film premiered in March 2010 as part of the South by Southwest. It was also screened at the 2010 Cannes Film Festival. The film was released as part of the Bloody Disgusting Selects line.
