= Closing the Ring =

- Theatrical release poster
- Directed by: Richard Attenborough
- Written by: Peter Woodward
- Produced by: Richard Attenborough; Jo Gilbert
- Starring: Shirley MacLaine; Christopher Plummer; Mischa Barton; Stephen Amell; Neve Campbell; Pete Postlethwaite; Brenda Fricker; Gregory Smith; David Alpay; Martin McCann
- Cinematography: Roger Pratt
- Edited by: Lesley Walker
- Music by: Jeff Danna
- Distributed by: The Works Distribution
- Release dates: 14 September 2007 (Toronto International Film Festival); 1 November 2007 (United Kingdom)
- Running time: 113 minutes
- Countries: Canada; United Kingdom; United States
- Language: English

Closing the Ring is a 2007 romantic drama film directed by Richard Attenborough and starring Shirley MacLaine, Christopher Plummer, Mischa Barton, Stephen Amell, Neve Campbell, Pete Postlethwaite, and Brenda Fricker. It was the final film directed by Attenborough. The film was released in both the Republic of Ireland and the United Kingdom on 28 December 2007. Closing the Ring is an international co-production between the United Kingdom, Canada, and United States.

== Plot ==
In rural Michigan in 1991, Marie Harris delivers the eulogy at the funeral of her father Chuck, a U.S. Army Air Force veteran who had fought in World War II. The church is full of veterans who knew and loved him. Her mother Ethel Ann is sitting out on the church porch, smoking and nursing a hangover.

Ethel is indifferent to Chuck's death, which only her friend Jack Etty seems to understand. Marie is furious with her mother and with her implication that she slept with many of the veterans when they were all young, but then Ethel relents and says that she was always faithful. It emerges that there is a lot Marie does not know about her mother's past and the true story of her love life.

A young Ethel was in love with young farmer Teddy Gordon, who builds a house with his best friends Jack and Chuck. Her parents think she is dating "good old reliable" Chuck (all three are in love with her), but within days of the Pearl Harbor attack, she has accepted Teddy's gold ring and unofficially married him – with Jack and Chuck as witnesses. The three young men fly out the next day. Teddy and Jack are stationed at RAF Langford Lodge near Belfast, where Jack plans to eventually propose to Eleanor, an Irish tart.

In 1991 in Belfast Jimmy Riley, Eleanor's young adult grandson, encounters local elder Michael Quinlan, who is digging for wreckage of a crashed B-17 aircraft on nearby Black Mountain. Jimmy finds a ring at the site and determines to return it to the woman from the "Ethel & Teddy" inscription. The United States Department of Veterans Affairs identify an Ethel to whom crash victim Teddy Gordon left his belongings.

Jimmy flees The Troubles for Michigan to give Ethel the ring. She reveals a wall covered in souvenirs of Teddy, which Jack and Chuck boarded up for her shortly after his death in June 1944. Marie is shocked and furious to learn that her mother still mourns for him, finally understanding why Ethel shut out Marie and Chuck. Jack later tells her the full story, including his own three failed marriages, Ethel's refusal to leave the house Teddy built for her, and her taking ten years to marry Chuck. Jack's son, Pete, realizes Jack always loved Ethel.

Ethel travels to Belfast with Jimmy. As she holds the hand of a dying British soldier after an IRA car-bomb attack, Quinlan tells Ethel that he, as a teenager, was on Black Mountain when Teddy died. Teddy had him promise to give Ethel the ring, and tell her she must be free to make her own choice in love. Quinlan tearfully says he should have reached out to her back then, and that he had spent 50 years looking for the ring that was lost in the final blast that killed Teddy, now regretfully thinking she needed it as much as she needed his dying words.

Joining Ethel in Belfast, Jack confesses that he has always loved her. She is finally able to cry and properly grieve for Teddy. She and Jack embrace.

== Main cast ==
- Shirley MacLaine as Ethel Ann Harris
  - Mischa Barton as Young Ethel Ann
- Christopher Plummer as Jack Etty
  - Gregory Smith as Young Jack
- Stephen Amell as Teddy Gordon
- Neve Campbell as Marie Harris
- Pete Postlethwaite as Michael Quinlan
  - John Travers as Young Michael Quinlan
- Brenda Fricker as Eleanor Riley
  - Kirsty Stuart as Young Eleanor
- David Alpay as Chuck Harris
- Allan Hawco as Peter Etty
- Ian McElhinney as Cathal Thomas
- Martin McCann as Jimmy Riley

== Production ==
Closing the Ring was filmed in Toronto and Hamilton, Ontario, Canada, and Belfast, County Antrim, Northern Ireland.

The B-17G used in the movie was Yankee Lady from the Yankee Air Museum (Ypsilanti, Michigan), which was also used in the movie Tora! Tora! Tora!. It was flown by Captain D. Eugene Wedekemper. (Note: A brief sequence showed a CCF Harvard IV from the Canadian Warplane Heritage Museum (Hamilton, Ontario).)

== Festival appearances ==
Closing the Ring had its world premiere at the Toronto International Film Festival on 14 September 2007. The film received its UK premiere at the London Film Festival on 21 October 2007.

== Reception ==
Closing the Ring attracted a mixed critical response. On the review aggregator website Rotten Tomatoes, 32% of 19 critics' reviews are positive, with an average rating of 4.6/10.

According to the Toronto International Film Festival, it "exemplifies the balance between the epic and the intimate that has been the hallmark of Lord Richard Attenborough's venerable career ... Attenborough traces multiple themes with ease and grace, giving his celebrated ensemble cast ample opportunity to shine". It concluded that the film is "a remarkable tale of love, loss and redemption that stands proudly among the films of one of the cinema's living legends. Deftly weaving together different eras and locales, Attenborough has produced another grand canvas about the emotional repercussions of a wartime promise."

Derek Malcolm of the Evening Standard wrote that it "... is well-acted throughout and it has a romantic appeal that is not to be sneered at ..."

Alan Morrison of Empire wrote "After recent disappointments, Sir Dickie Attenborough is back on better, albeit old-fashioned, form."

Philip French of The Observer wrote "Woodward's script is more than a little contrived, as well as over-emphatic. But Attenborough has infused it with warmth and mature insight, and older members of the audience are likely to find it extremely moving."

Laura Bushell of BBCi Films called the film a "... looping tale of love and loss in WWII which is so old fashioned in its aspirations, it's hard to see why new audiences would flock to see it."

Joe Leydon in his Variety review, called the film "... decades-skipping schmaltz" and an "aggressively bittersweet yet oddly uninvolving drama."
