= Eva Birthistle =

Irish actress and writer

- Birthistle in 2026
- Born: 16 April 1974 (age 52); Bray, County Wicklow, Ireland
- Occupation: Actress
- Children: 2

Eva Birthistle (born 16 April 1974) is an Irish actress and writer. She is best known for her roles in Bad Sisters and Ae Fond Kiss..., and for her work on The Last Kingdom between 2015 and 2022. She won the London Film Critics Circle British or Irish Actress of the Year Award in 2004, and has twice won the IFTA Best Actress in a Leading Role (Film) award.

== Early life and education ==
Birthistle was born in Bray, County Wicklow, Republic of Ireland, but moved with her family to Derry, Northern Ireland when she was 14. She was raised Catholic but attended the non-denominational Foyle College. After her GCSEs, she studied acting at The Gaiety School of Acting in Dublin.

== Career ==
In 1995, she got her first TV role as Regina Crosbie in the serial Glenroe. She stayed for three years until 1998. She was offered her first feature film in 1997, All Souls' Day by Alan Gilsenan. She played a variety of roles in Irish films, including Drinking Crude (1997), co-starring Colin Farrell, and TV movie Miracle at Midnight (1998), with Mia Farrow. In 2002, Eva appeared in Sunday, a dramatisation of the events of Bloody Sunday written by Jimmy McGovern.

In 2003, she appeared in the TV series Trust before starring as Roisin Hanlon in the Ken Loach movie Ae Fond Kiss... (2003–04), which won her the 2005 London Critics Circle Film Award as "British Actress of the Year". She appeared in Breakfast on Pluto, Imagine Me & You and Save Angel Hope (by Lukas Erni) in 2005, and in Brian Kirk's Middletown in 2006. She starred as human rights lawyer Jane Lavery in the TV conspiracy drama The State Within, and played Rosaleen in the Taken at the Flood episode of Agatha Christie's Poirot in 2006. In late 2007, she featured as Rembrandt's wife Saskia van Uylenburg in the historical drama, Nightwatching by Peter Greenaway.

She featured in the BBC drama The Last Enemy in early 2008, playing the role of Eleanor Brooke, a junior minister. In 2009, she portrayed Jenette in the last episode of the second season of the BBC hit series Ashes to Ashes. She also appeared in two successful horror films The Children (2008) and Wake Wood (2011). In 2010, she won Best Actress at the Myrtle Beach International Film Festival for her acclaimed performance as a lovelorn paralegal in Curt Truninger's The Rendezvous.

She played "Annette Nicholls" in the 2010 three-part TV series Five Daughters. She appeared as Detective Superintendent Sarah Cavendish in the ninth, and final, series of Waking the Dead. In 2011, Birthistle appeared in the Sky1 TV series Strike Back: Project Dawn as Captain Kate Marshall. In 2013, Birthistle co-starred with Anna Friel in the Sky1 TV production The Psychopath Next Door. In Brooklyn she played Georgina, the cabin-mate of Eilis (Saoirse Ronan), mentoring her in surviving the voyage to New York and dealing with immigration to the US. In 2014, she portrayed Sarah Bailey in the miniseries Amber. Since 2015, she has starred in The Last Kingdom as Hild, a nun turned warrior and friend of Uhtred of Bebbanburg. She appeared in the 2017 Irish film The Delinquent Season opposite Cillian Murphy.

In 2020 she made her directorial debut with the short film Kathleen Was Here, starring Hazel Doupe. In 2024, she expanded it into her feature directorial debut, Kathleen Is Here, also starring Doupe as the title character.

== Personal life ==
Birthistle's husband, Ross Barr, is an acupuncturist. They have a son, Jesse, born in 2013, and a daughter, Joni (named after Joni Mitchell), born in 2017.

== Filmography ==
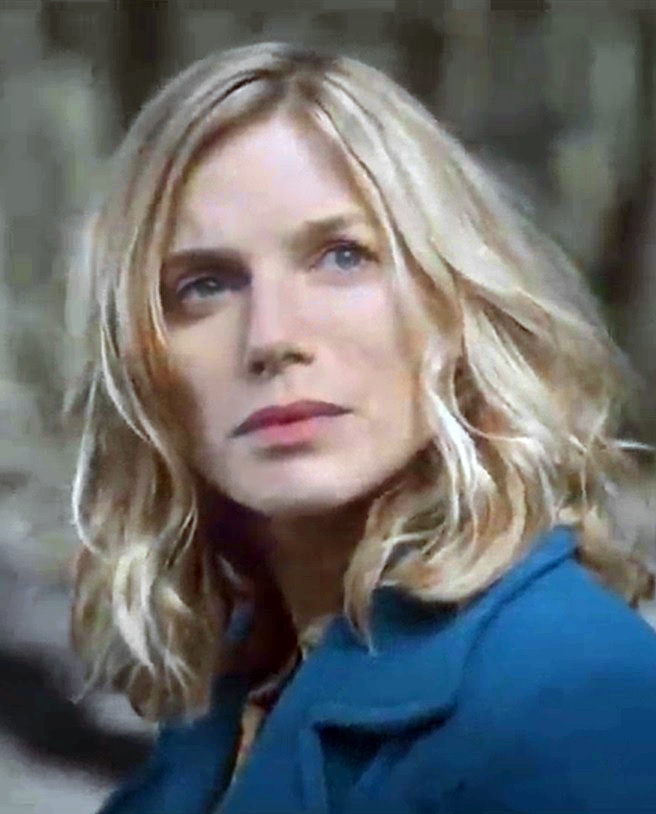
Birthistle in Here With Me (2014)

=== Film ===
Year	Film	Role	Notes	Ref.
1997	All Souls' Day	Nicole		
1997	Drinking Crude			
1998	Miracle at Midnight	Karin	Television film	
1998	The American	Noemie Nioche	Television film	
1998	Getting Close	Jane	Short film	
1999	Making Ends Meet	Kathy		
2000	Saltwater	Deborah McCeever		
2000	Borstal Boy	Liz Joyce		
2000	Coolockland	Bird	Short film	
2002	Sunday	Maura Young	Television film	
2003	Mystics	Samantha		
2004	Timbuktu	Isobel		
2004	Ae Fond Kiss ...	Roisin Hanlon		
2005	The Baby War	Megan	Television film	
2005	Breakfast on Pluto	Eily Bergin		
2005	Imagine Me & You	Edie		
2006	Middletown	Caroline		
2007	The Martyr's Crown	Mrs. Clougherty	Short film	
2007	Nightwatching	Saskia van Uylenburgh		
2007	Save Angel Hope	Renee Frye		
2008	The Daisy Chain	Cat		
2008	Reverb	Maddy		
2008	The Children	Elaine		
2009	Wake Wood	Louise Daley		
2010	The Crossing		Short film	
2010	The Rendezvous	Jackie		
2012	Day of the Flowers	Rosa		
2013	Life's a Breeze	Margaret		
2013	The Psychopath Next Door	Marianne Moran	Television film	
2014	Noble	Sister Laura		
2014	Here with Me	Emily	Short film	
2015	Brooklyn	Georgina		
2015	Swansong	Karen Prince		
2016	The Circuit	Nat	Television film	
2018	The Delinquent Season	Danielle		
2026	No Ordinary Heist	Celine Murray		
2026	Up Against It	Saffron		

=== Television ===
Year	Title	Role	Notes	Ref.
1996–1998	Glenroe	Regina Crosbie	Recurring role	
1999	DDU: District Detective Unit	Mary Kelly	Episode: "Unforgiven"	
2001	In Deep	Tina Shaw	Episode: "Ghost Squad"	
2002	Holby City	Vicky	Episode: "Cruel to Be Kind"	
2003	Trust	Maria Acklam	Miniseries; 6 episodes	
2003	Silent Witness	Lauren Hathaway	Episode: "Fatal Error"	
2006	Agatha Christie's Poirot	Rosaleen	Episode: "Taken at the Flood"	
2006	The State Within	Jane Lavery	Miniseries; 6 episodes	
2008	The Last Enemy	Eleanor Brooke	Miniseries; 5 episodes	
2009	Ashes to Ashes	Jenette	Episode: "Series 2, Episode 8"	
2010	Five Daughters	Annette Nicholls	Miniseries; 3 episodes	
2011	Waking the Dead	DSI Sarah Cavendish	Series regular; 10 episodes	
2011	Strike Back: Project Dawn	Captain Kate Marshall	Recurring role; 6 episodes	
2012	Case Sensitive	Ruth Blacksmith	Episode: "The Other Half Lives"	
2014	Amber	Sarah Bailey	Miniseries; 4 episodes	
2014	Vera	Kate Darrow	Episode: "On Harbour Street"	
2015–2022	The Last Kingdom	Hild	Recurring role; 17 episodes	
2018	The Bisexual	Laura	Miniseries; 5 episodes	
2021	Fate: The Winx Saga	Vanessa Peters	Recurring role; 3 episodes	
2021	Behind Her Eyes	Marianne	Episode: "Behind Her Eyes"	
2022–present	Bad Sisters	Ursula Flynn	Series regular	
