= DDU: District Detective Unit =

- Genre: Crime drama
- Created by: Jim Lusby
- Directed by: A.J. Quinn; Martyn Friend; Alan Grint
- Starring: Sean McGinley; Andrea Irvine; Dermot Martin; Owen Roe; Conor McDermottroe; Ingrid Craigie; Bosco Hogan; Mary O'Driscoll; Gerard McSorley; Jim Norton
- Theme music composer: John Moloney
- Country of origin: Ireland
- Original language: English
- No. of series: 2
- No. of episodes: 5

Production
- Executive producer: Paul Cusack
- Producer: Martin O'Malley
- Production locations: Waterford, Ireland; Dublin, Ireland
- Cinematography: Cedric Culliton
- Running time: 60 minutes

Original release
- Network: RTÉ One
- Release: 1998 – 21 November 1999

DDU: District Detective Unit is an Irish crime drama series, first aired on RTÉ One in 1998, under the title of Making the Cut. The series focuses on a serial crime unit based in Waterford, Ireland, headed by Sergeant Carl McCadden (Sean McGinley), who tackle the murky underworld of crime in Dublin. The series explores the heartbreaking and tragic impact of crime on Irish society and explores the personal impact on the detectives at the centre of the story, whose lives are permanently changing as they are exposed to the harsh underbelly of the Celtic Tiger.

Making the Cut, a single 120-minute pilot, aired in 1998, based on the novel of the same name by writer Jim Lusby. Following strong viewing figures and critical acclaim, a four part follow-up, entitled DDU: District Detective Unit, was commissioned for broadcast in 1999. DDU comprises two two-part stories, "Unforgiven" and "The Gates of Eden". "Unforgiven" explores the desperate realities of prostitution and the devastating effect of child abuse focusing on the effects of retribution by the victim. "The Gates of Eden" deals with the ever-increasing problem of immigration and what happens when a Romanian family forced to leave their homeland, become embroiled in somebody else’s criminal plans.

Despite being heralded as one of the finest original crime dramas to originate from Ireland, DDU was not recommissioned. Notably, the series has never been released on DVD.

== Cast ==
- Sean McGinley as Garda Det. Carl McCadden
- Andrea Irvine as Garda Det. Moya O'Donnell
- Dermot Martin as Garda Det. Brendan Cronin
- Owen Roe as Garda Det. Paul Hyland
- Conor McDermottroe as Garda Det. Frank Duffy
- Gerard McSorley as Garda Det. Mick Casey
- Jim Norton as Garda Det. Tom Regan
- Ingrid Craigie as Dr. Kate Dempsey
- Bosco Hogan as Garda Chief Inspector Cody
- Mary O'Driscoll as Brenda Boyle

== Episodes ==
=== Pilot (1998) ===
| No. | Title | Directed by | Written by | Original release date |
|---|---|---|---|---|
| 1 | "Making the Cut" | John Brown | Martyn Friend | 1998 |
On a Saturday night in October during a dock strike, a wino looking for a place to sleep breaks into a cargo container full of peat moss. But there’s already someone else in residence, wrapped in a bin-bag, head protruding from a tear in one end, a rough X carved on his face. Unshaven, unorthodox and unpopular with his superiors, Detective Inspector Carl McCadden must figure out exactly what Billy Power, keeper of greyhounds, and Jack-the-Lad about Waterford - was involved in, and why he had to die. But straight answers about Power, or anything else for that matter, are hard to come by…

=== Series (1999) ===
| No. | Title | Directed by | Written by | Original release date |
|---|---|---|---|---|
| 1 | "Unforgiven: Part 1" | Alan Grint | Michael Russell | 31 October 1999 |
| 2 | "Unforgiven: Part 2" | Alan Grint | Michael Russell | 7 November 1999 |
| 3 | "The Gates of Eden: Part 1" | A.J. Quinn | Michael Russell | 14 November 1999 |
| 4 | "The Gates of Eden: Part 2" | A.J. Quinn | Michael Russell | 21 November 1999 |
