= Wilderness (2006 film) =

2006 British-Irish horror film

- Film poster
- Directed by: M. J. Bassett
- Written by: Dario Poloni
- Produced by: Robert Bernstein; John McDonnell; Douglas Rae
- Starring: Sean Pertwee; Alex Reid; Toby Kebbell; Karly Greene; Lenora Crichlow
- Cinematography: Peter Robertson
- Edited by: Kate Evans
- Music by: Mark Thomas
- Distributed by: Momentum Pictures
- Release date: 19 March 2006
- Running time: 110 minutes
- Countries: United Kingdom; Ireland
- Language: English

Wilderness is a 2006 slasher film directed by M. J. Bassett and starring Sean Pertwee, Alex Reid, Toby Kebbell, Karly Greene, and Lenora Crichlow.

== Plot ==
The film starts with the arrival of Callum at a small juvenile facility run by Jed, and consisting of Steve, Blue, Jethro, Lindsay, Davie and Lewis. It is implied that the group gives Davie and Lindsay a hard time, and when Davie answers back to Steve's taunts, Steve and Lewis humiliate the two by urinating on them. Callum later discovers Davie has killed himself by slashing his wrists. Davie's dad learns about the suicide and the group, along with Jed, are sent to an island for team building exercises. Once arriving, the group notices something odd about it.

Callum is knocked out by an unseen force and is discovered by the group. They go swimming and afterwards Jed notices a campfire in the distance. Lindsay is captured by an unseen force. They then meet a group of women, consisting of team leader Louise and her charges Jo and Mandy. Jed and Louise come to agreement to keep the groups separate, while Jo and Lewis form a romance.

Steve and Lewis discover a homeless man and chase after him. The man attacks Steve with a stick in defence, prompting Steve to beat him with it and Callum later discovers him dead. Callum is caught by Jed and Louise washing the blood off his hands and is handcuffed to a tree. Jed discovers his emergency phone missing and blames the group for taking it, which angers Steve. Jed and Louise decide to merge the groups for safety.

The next morning Jethro wakes up to go get more water and is then attacked by something. Jed orders Blue and Lindsay to go find him and they discover his dismembered arm in the water. The group is then ambushed and Jed shot with arrows to disable him and then disemboweled & gets mauled by a group of four dogs who act on command via a whistle. One of the dogs chases Louise and Callum but Louise sacrifices herself by leading the dogs away and she is knocked off a cliff.

The group discover Jethro's body hanging from a tree with the letter D carved into his flesh. They find a cabin and take refuge in it. Lindsay reveals everything he knew, including who the killer is, which is Davie's dad. The next morning the group venture outside and Blue attempts to rape Jo enraging Lewis who attacks him and Blue runs away only to step on a bear trap and although Mandy and Callum attempt to free Blue he is killed after he falls face first into another trap. Davie's dad then forces the rest of them out of the cabin with smoke. As they make their escape Steve leaves Lindsay who is struggling to keep up.

The remaining group finds that Louise is alive but badly injured so they decide to put her in a safe, dry area and go and search for a boat but Louise is killed when Davie's dad sneaks up on her in camouflage and slashes her throat. The group split up to search for a boat with Steve teaming up with Lewis and Callum with the girls. Steve finds a boat and plans to leave the others and Lewis agrees to it eventually. They discover the fuel line is cut and Davie's dad shoots at them with a flaming arrow causing the boat to go up in flames. The dogs return and Steve and Lewis climb up the rock face to avoid them and the rest wading into the water. Steve and Lewis discover Lindsay and attack him and eventually use him as bait for the dogs.

The dogs are eventually called back but one stays behind and Callum kills it. The group discovers Louise's head on a stick with Davie's name written in blood on her head, prompting Callum to cut the dog's head off. They then cook the dog and eat it. Callum then walks to the islands highest point and holds the dogs head up trying to distract Davie's dad. Steve and Mandy then fight the next morning over what to do next and Steve attacks her.

Lewis subdues Steve and Steve calms down while Mandy runs away. Jo then tells Steve he is poison and Lewis does not need him any longer, prompting him to kill Lewis. Jo then runs away and is caught in a trap. Steve finds her and she begs him for help. He then declines and she is burned alive.

Steve runs into Lindsay and ties him to a tree. Davie's dad appears and Steve claims Lindsay is the one who bullied Davie but the dad forces Steve to feel his sons pain and cut his wrists. Steve then taunts him and throws a knife in his leg, only to be shot in the head with the crossbow. Davie's dad cuts Lindsay free and tells him to meet him by the boat, which Mandy overhears as she hides in the tree line. Callum appears and calls the dad out on his actions.

The two fight and Callum wounds the dad with an axe and chases after Davie's dad with the crossbow. Mandy confronts Lindsay over his actions and he confesses to asking Davie's dad to come and kill them all, Lindsay smiles as he backs away from her and falls off the cliff to his death. Callum prepares to shoot Davie's dad with the crossbow but the latter succumbs to his wounds on the beach. Mandy and Callum reunite and Callum states that "everyone died on the island". The two then get on the boat and leave the island.

== Cast ==
- Sean Pertwee as Jed
- Alex Reid as Louise
- Toby Kebbell as Callum
- Stephen Wight as Steve
- Luke Neal as Lewis
- Ben McKay as Lindsay
- Lenora Crichlow as Mandy
- Karly Greene as Jo
- Adam Deacon as Blue

== Production ==
The film was produced and distributed by a consortium of independents, and directed by M. J. Bassett, whose previous credits include 2002's Deathwatch. The story was filmed on location in Scotland, Northern Ireland and the Republic of Ireland.

== Release ==
Wilderness premiered at the Brussels International Festival of Fantastic Film on 19 March 2006, and its UK premiere was at the Belfast Film Festival on 1 April 2006.

== Reception ==
Rotten Tomatoes, a review aggregator, reports that Wilderness received positive reviews by 29% of seven reviewers; the average rating was 4.4/10. John Condit of DreadCentral rated it 3/5 stars and stated that it would polarize viewers into two camps: gorehounds and genre snobs. In a mixed review, Philip French of The Guardian compared it to Dog Soldiers and described its sense of justice as "arbitrary". Geoffrey Macnab, also of The Guardian, rated it 3/5 and stated that it is an entertaining B movie. Leslie Felperin of Variety said that the film is "schlocky", but its target demographic of teens will enjoy it. Nigel Floyd of Time Out London rated it 4/5 and described it as "taut and visceral". Jamie Russell of the BBC rated the film 2/5 and states that the film has "atrocious editing and hapless direction". Jeremy Knox of Film Threat rated it 3.5/5 and called it familiar yet "a cut above the rest".
