= The Last Days on Mars =

2013 Irish/UK sci-fi-horror film

- Theatrical release poster
- Directed by: Ruairí Robinson
- Screenplay by: Clive Dawson
- Based on: "The Animators" by Sydney J. Bounds
- Produced by: Michael Kuhn; Andrea Cornwell
- Starring: Liev Schreiber; Elias Koteas; Romola Garai; Goran Kostić; Johnny Harris; Tom Cullen; Yusra Warsama; Olivia Williams
- Cinematography: Robbie Ryan
- Edited by: Peter Lambert
- Music by: Max Richter
- Production companies: BFI; Bord Scannán na hÉirann/The Irish Film Board; Qwerty Films; Fantastic Films; Focus Features International
- Distributed by: Universal Pictures
- Release dates: 20 May 2013 (Cannes); 19 September 2013 (International); 6 December 2013 (United States); 11 April 2014 (United Kingdom)
- Running time: 98 minutes
- Countries: Ireland; United Kingdom
- Language: English
- Budget: $10.6 million
- Box office: $187,191

The Last Days on Mars is a 2013 science fiction horror film directed by Ruairí Robinson with a screenplay by Clive Dawson, based on the short story "The Animators" by Sydney J. Bounds. It stars Liev Schreiber, Elias Koteas, Romola Garai, Goran Kostić, Johnny Harris, Tom Cullen, Yusra Warsama, and Olivia Williams. The film was an international co-production between Ireland and United Kingdom.

The Last Days on Mars was screened in the Directors' Fortnight section at the 2013 Cannes Film Festival. It received a limited release on 6 December 2013 in the United States and 11 April 2014 in the United Kingdom.

== Plot ==
In the 2040s, a Martian research base, Tantalus Base outpost, is established. The eight-person crew, which has been stationed there for six months, is only nineteen hours from the completion of their research mission. The spacecraft Aurora is inbound from Earth and will collect the team by lander.

Mars scientist Marko Petrović has found samples that point to life on the planet. Without revealing his discovery, he devises a ruse for the final EVA on the surface. Crewmate Richard Harrington drives Petrović in a solar-powered rover to the spot where he found the sample. After he obtains soil with the biological agent present, Petrović falls into a sinkhole that suddenly opens.

Captain Charles Brunel and crewmate Lauren Dalby plan to explore the pit to retrieve Petrović's body. Dalby remains at the pit but disappears before the team can return with equipment. Brunel authorizes Vincent Campbell to explore the pit. He finds that a bacterial organism is present in the fissure. Dalby and Petrović reappear at the main outpost, but exposure to the organism has altered them into fast, aggressive, feral zombie-like creatures with blackened skin and no trace of their original personalities. Harrington dies from a power drill attack by one of the zombies and later revives as one himself. The remaining crew hold off the zombies while Brunel and Campbell return. Brunel is also fatally injured and reanimates, which provides the crew with new insight into the symptoms: thirst, memory loss and aggression. It's also discovered that antibiotics delay the infection.

After several fights and escapes from the zombies through the habitat modules, mission psychologist Robert Irwin saves himself by trapping scientist Kim Aldrich in the hydroponics lab with one of the zombies. Rebecca Lane is also stabbed in the leg during the frantic escape to a rover. With their rover's power low, the survivors – Campbell, Irwin, and Lane – decide they must get to the other rover, which is still at the site of the fissure. Under the pretence of a scouting operation, Irwin steals the second rover and fails to persuade Campbell to abandon Lane, whom he states is infected. Irwin meanwhile conceals evidence of his own possible infection.

While Campbell and Lane wait for the sun to rise and the solar-powered batteries to recharge, they discuss the nature of the zombies. Lane questions whether any human consciousness remains trapped in them. Campbell attempts to comfort her and falls asleep. When he awakens alone, Campbell realizes that Lane has fled into the desert, so he chases her. Lane, who knows she is likely to transform, fails to deter Campbell from following her. In desperation, she commits suicide by removing her helmet. After she dies, Lane reanimates and begs Campbell to destroy her. Campbell reluctantly complies.

Campbell and Irwin separately converge on the Aurora lander, where the reanimated Aldrich kills the lander's crew. Petrovic and the other zombies appear desiccated and inert. An infected Irwin initiates a launch, which takes him and Campbell into orbit. Campbell kills Irwin and ejects the body and virulent blood droplets into the vacuum of space. In a message to mission control, Campbell says he does not have enough fuel for a rendezvous but that supplies aboard can last for months if they want to launch a rescue. He tells them that this might not be advisable as he could be infected, having received a cut on his face during his tussle with Irwin; if so he has just enough fuel for re-entry and a fast death. Campbell concludes that it will take 15 minutes for the transmission to be received and will await their reply. He subsequently ends the communication, still floating alone in space.

== Cast ==
- Liev Schreiber as Vincent Campbell
- Elias Koteas as Charles Brunel
- Romola Garai as Rebecca Lane
- Goran Kostić as Marko Petrovic
- Johnny Harris as Robert Irwin
- Tom Cullen as Richard Harrington
- Yusra Warsama as Lauren Dalby
- Olivia Williams as Kim Aldrich

== Production ==
Principal photography went from May to July 2012. Exterior shots took place in Jordan, and then shooting moved to Elstree Studios in England. The Jordanian vegetation was removed digitally.

According to The Last Days on Mars director Ruairí Robinson, Paul Walker was offered the role of Vincent Campbell just before his untimely death, but Paul Walker's father Paul William Walker III refused. Philip Seymour Hoffman (also just before his untimely death) and Nikolaj Coster-Waldau were also considered for the role of Vincent Campbell. When casting began in April 2012, Liev Schreiber took the role of Vincent Campbell.

The visual effects for The Last Days on Mars were done by Screen Scene VFX in Ireland. Influences include Paul Greengrass, Michael Mann, and Sergio Leone; Robinson wanted to make a paranoid thriller reminiscent of Alien.

== Reception ==
Rotten Tomatoes, a review aggregator, gave the film a 18% rating, with a negative site consensus: "Neither intelligent enough to work as thought-provoking sci-fi nor trashy enough to provide B-movie thrills, The Last Days on Mars proves as cinematically barren as the titular planet."

Metacritic rated it 46/100 based on 21 reviews, indicating "Mixed or average reviews".

Justin Chang of Variety called it a "murkily derivative sci-fi-horror entry that basically amounts to Red Planet of the Dead."

Stephen Holden of The New York Times called it "good on atmospherics but unimaginatively plotted".

David Rooney of The Hollywood Reporter called it atmospheric and gripping but "unapologetically derivative".

Tim Robey of The Daily Telegraph gave the film 2/5 stars: "You've never seen the red planet looking quite as humdrum as the one in The Last Days on Mars."

Charlotte O'Sullivan of the Evening Standard also gave the film 2/5 stars: "Even at 98 minutes, the whole thing lasts way too long."

Stephanie Merry of The Washington Post gave the film 1.5/4 stars, writing that it "seems like it could deliver such thought-provoking goods — at least until the plot devolves into Zombies in Outer Space".

Peter Howell of the Toronto Star gave the film 2/4 stars, writing: "The Last Days on Mars doesn’t break any new dramatic ground, but it does a reasonable job of stretching an obviously lean production budget."

Kenneth Turan of the Los Angeles Times wrote: "Lean, muscular and on the money, The Last Days on Mars takes a familiar story and tells it so tautly that we are pleased to be on board."

Peter Bradshaw of The Guardian gave the film 3/5 stars, saying that it was "an elegantly crafted adventure in classical science-fiction".

Kate Muir of The Times wrote: "With The Last Days on Mars, Ruairí Robinson has made a courageous effort to pull off a sci-fi horror on the cheap."

== See also ==
- List of films set on Mars
