= Song for a Raggy Boy =

- DVD Cover for Song for a Raggy Boy
- Directed by: Aisling Walsh
- Written by: Aisling Walsh; Kevin Byron Murphy
- Based on: Song for a Raggy Boy by Patrick Galvin
- Starring: Aidan Quinn; Iain Glen; Marc Warren; Stuart Graham; Alan Devlin; Dudley Sutton
- Music by: Richard Blackford
- Release date: 17 October 2003 (Ireland)
- Running time: 93 minutes
- Countries: Ireland; United Kingdom; Denmark; Spain
- Language: English

Song for a Raggy Boy is a 2003 Irish historical drama film directed by Aisling Walsh who co-wrote the screenplay with Kevin Byron Murphy and based on the 1991 autobiographical book of the same name by Patrick Galvin and heavily inspired by true events. The film stars Aidan Quinn, Iain Glen, Chris Newman, Marc Warren and John Travers.

Set in 1939 Ireland, on the brink of World War II, the film takes place in St. Jude’s Reformatory School, a harsh Catholic institution for troubled and orphaned boys run by the Irish Christian Brothers. The story follows William Franklin (Quinn), the school’s only lay (non-religious) teacher and a veteran of the Spanish Civil War who is haunted by his past, who arrives with progressive teaching ideas and a belief in treating the boys with kindness and respect. After being appalled by the brutal, authoritarian regime of the school, particularly with the cruel Brother John (Glen), who believes in discipline through physical punishment, and the more complex, conflicted Brother Mac (Warren), he fights to liberate the boys from their oppressors.

== Plot ==
In 1939, on the brink of World War II, the St. Judes Reformatory is a ruthless Irish school for boys. Grey, gloomy and ruled by the sadistic Brother John (Iain Glen), the school prefers punishment to rehabilitation. But new lay teacher William Franklin (Aidan Quinn), fresh from the frontline of the Spanish Civil War, fights to liberate the boys from their oppressors.

Patrick Delaney 743 (Chris Newman) arrives at the school aged 13 and a half. He, like all the boys, is allocated a number which the brothers use. Franklin, however, always uses the boys' names. Delaney is an attractive boy and receives the unwelcome attention of Brother Mac (Marc Warren), who rapes the boy in the school toilets. The boy tells of his ordeal to a visiting priest in confession only to be told not to say a word to anyone. Word of Delaney's confession reaches Brother Mac who punishes the boy by forcing him under a cold shower naked, then giving him his clothes so they are also wet.

Liam Mercier 636 (John Travers) is one of the few boys who can read and write, but is otherwise a hard case. Franklin befriends the boy and interests him in poetry, some of it written by communist sympathisers. Mercier and Franklin both challenge the authority of Brother John - Mercier by protesting at the vicious beating of two brothers, (Gerald and Sean Peters) on Christmas Day, (after both brothers cross the dividing wall to be with each other) and Franklin by stepping in and actually stopping the whipping. Brother John bides his time and, having tricked Mercier into coming out of class, beats him continuously in front of Brother Mac in the refectory. Franklin is eventually told by Brother Mac that Mercier is in the refectory, after which Franklin discovers Mercier's dead body. He carries the corpse out of the room.

Livid, Franklin attacks Brother John, calling him a murderer. Brothers John and Mac are taken from the school by the Church authorities. At Mercier's funeral, Franklin tells the other boys that his death was murder, before kissing the coffin. Franklin decides he has to leave the school, but is persuaded to stay at the last minute when he is moved by Delaney reciting Eva Gore-Booth's poem "Comrades" across the playground. Franklin drops his bags and Delaney runs towards Franklin and jumps up to hug him while all the other boys gather round in love and affection for their saviour.

== Production ==
The film took over four years to make because of difficulties getting it started; some were casting problems, others to do with raising financing. One casting problem was finding the ideal boy to play Liam Mercier, who the director felt was vital to cast well. Eventually they auditioned John Travers, a boy from an Irish boxing club with no previous acting experience.

Aidan Quinn had been attached to the script for two and a half years before production. It was filmed on location in County Cork and County Kerry in Ireland. The school scenes were filmed at Coláiste Iosagán, a former De La Salle college in Ballyvourney. It was an Irish/Danish/UK/Spanish co-production, and was produced with the support of investment incentives for the Irish film industry provided by the Government of Ireland.

== Cast ==
=== Main cast ===
- Aidan Quinn – William Franklin
- Iain Glen – Brother John
- Marc Warren – Brother Mac
- Dudley Sutton – Brother Tom
- Alan Devlin – Father Damian
- Stuart Graham – Brother Whelan
- John Travers – Liam Mercier 636
- Chris Newman – Patrick Delaney 743
- Andrew Simpson – Gerard Peters 458

=== The Boys ===
- Robert Sheehan – O'Reilly 58
- Caoimhin 'Tojo' Barra Doherty – Murphy 388
- Samuel Bright – Ryan 126
- Mark Butler – Downey 913
- Bernard Manning – Rodgers 855
- Michael McGee – Lynch 76
- John Collins – O Connor 252
- Michael Scott – Flynn 144
- Robert White – Galvin 544
- Michael Sloan – Sean Peters 568

== Reception ==
On review aggregator Rotten Tomatoes, the film has an approval rating of 67%, based on 6 reviews, with a weighted average rating of 5.80/10.

In The Guardian, Peter Bradshaw rated it 2/5 stars saying, "it's a formula beloved since Nicholas Nickleby and Dotheboys Hall, but here given a new miserabilist anti-clerical spin and imbued with Hollywood-ised cliche of goodies and baddies. And the sugar-rush happy ending is just a joke."

In his review for Variety, David Rooney said that "director Aisling Walsh for the most part brings an admirably even-handed approach to brutal material in Song For a Raggy Boy (...) While the screenplay judiciously avoids blanket accusations by confining the truly sadistic behavior to one priest, the film underlines the moral fragility of the Church."
