= 48 Angels =

- US film poster
- Directed by: Marion Comer
- Written by: Marion Comer; Craig Holland
- Produced by: Marion Comer; John McDonnell; Robert Medema
- Starring: Shane Brolly; John Travers; Ciaran Flynn; Sean McGinley
- Cinematography: Russell Gleeson
- Edited by: J. Patrick Duffner
- Music by: Paul McDonnell
- Release date: November 14, 2007 (St. Louis International Film Festival)
- Running time: 92 minutes
- Country: Ireland
- Language: English

48 Angels is a 2007 drama film directed by Marion Comer and starring Shane Brolly, John Travers, Ciaran Flynn, and Sean McGinley.

== Plot ==
Seamus (Ciaran Flynn) is a 9-year-old boy who has been diagnosed with a serious illness. In search of a miracle, he sets off to find God before God comes for him. Inspired by Saint Columcille and his journey to the island of Iona, Seamus sets out in a small boat without oars or sail. On his quest he encounters James (John Travers) and Darry (Shane Brolly). Despite initial conflict, the trio decides to stay together and enters upon a journey that results in the healing of their hearts and minds.
