= 7th Irish Film & Television Awards =

Annual Irish film and television awards ceremony

- Date: 20 February 2010
- Site: Burlington Hotel, Dublin
- Hosted by: Victoria Smurfit

Highlights
- Best Film: The Eclipse
- Best Actor: Colin Farrell; Ondine
- Best Actress: Saoirse Ronan; The Lovely Bones
- Most awards: Ondine (5)
- Most nominations: The Eclipse (8); Ondine (8)

The 7th Irish Film & Television Awards took place on 20 February 2010 in the Burlington Hotel, Dublin. It was hosted by Victoria Smurfit and honoured Irish film and television released in 2009.

== Awards in film ==
Best Film

- The Eclipse (Winner)
  - Ondine
  - The Secret of Kells
  - Zonad
  - Eamon

Director in Film

- Jim Sheridan – Brothers (Winner)
  - Neil Jordan – Ondine
  - John Carney, Kieran Carney – Zonad
  - Conor McPherson – The Eclipse

Script Film

- Conor McPherson, Billy Roache – The Eclipse (Winner)
  - Neil Jordan – Ondine
  - John Carney, Kieran Carney – Zonad
  - Margaret Corkery – Eamon

Actor in a lead role

- Colin Farrell – Ondine (Winner)
  - Ciarán Hinds – The Eclipse
  - Darren Healy – Savage
  - Stephen Rea – Nothing personal

Actress in a lead role

- Saoirse Ronan – The Lovely Bones (Winner)
  - Janice Byrne – Zonad
  - Amy Kirwan – Eamon
  - Jade Yourell – Happy Ever Afters

Actor in a Supporting Role Film

- Aidan Quinn – The Eclipse (Winner)
  - Simon Delaney – Happy Ever Afters
  - Michael Fassbender – Fish Tank
  - Michael Gambon – Harry Potter and Half Blood Prince

Actress in a Supporting Role Film

- Dervla Kirwan – Ondine (Winner)
  - Anne Marie Duff – Nowhere Boy
  - Nora-Jane Noone – Savage
  - Ger Ryan – Happy Ever Afters

Feature Documentary

- His & Hers (Winner)
  - The Bass Player: A song for dad
  - Colony
  - The Yellow Bittern

=== International film ===
Best International Film

- The Hurt Locker (United States) (Winner)
  - Avatar (United States)
  - Let the Right One In (Sweden)
  - Up (United States)

Best International Actress

- Meryl Streep – It's Complicated
  - Marion Cotillard – Nine
  - Penélope Cruz – Broken Embraces
  - Anna Kendrick – Up in the Air

Best International Actor

- Robert Downey Jr. – Sherlock Holmes
  - Sam Rockwell – Moon
  - Vincent Cassel – Mesrine: Killer Instinct
  - Stanley Tucci – The Lovely Bones

== Craft / technical categories (film and television) ==
Costume Design

- Consolata Boyle – Chéri (Winner)
  - Joan Bergin – The Tudors
  - Allison Byrne – Cracks
  - Eimer Ní Mhaoldomhnaigh – Ondine

Director of Photography

- Suzie Lavelle – One Hundred Mornings (Winner)
  - Tom Comerford – Savage
  - Ivan McCullough – The Eclipse
  - Ruairí O'Brien – Five Minutes of Heaven

Editing

- Mairead McIvor – Savage (Winner)
  - Emer Reynolds – The Eclipse
  - Isobel Stephenson – Pure Mule – The Last Weekend
  - Ken Wardrop – His & Hers

Make Up & Hair

- The Take – Lorraine Glynn, Morna Ferguson
  - Five Minutes of Heaven – Pamela Smyth
  - The Tudors – Sharon Doyle, Dee Corcoran
  - Zonad – Eileen Buggy, Barbara Conway

Original Score

- Brian Byrne – Zonad
  - Neil Hannon – Wide Open Spaces
  - The Henry Girls – A Shine of Rainbows
  - Stephen McKeon – Savage

Production Design

- Anna Rackard – Ondine (Winner)
  - Tom Conroy – The Tudors
  - Susie Cullen – The Take
  - Ashleigh Jeffers – Occupation

Sound

- Ondine – Brendan Deasy, Tom Johnson, Sarah Gaines (Winner)
  - The Eclipse – Ronan Hill, Jon Stevenson, John Fitzgerald
  - Five Minutes of Heaven – Ronan Hill, Jon Stevenson, John Fitzgerald
  - Savage – Patrick Hanlon, John Fitzgerald, Fiadhnait McCann

== Television drama categories ==
Single Drama / Drama Serial

- Five Minutes of Heaven Winner
  - Belonging to Laura
  - Best: His Mother's Son
  - Father & Son
  - Rásaí na Gaillimhe

Drama Series / Soap

- The Clinic Winner
  - Fair City
  - Pure Mule – The Last Weekend
  - Ros na Rún
  - The Tudors

Director Television

- Thaddeus O'Sullivan – Into the Storm (Winner)
  - Ciaran Donnelly – The Tudors
  - Robert Quinn – Rásaí na Gaillimhe
  - Declan Recks – Pure Mule – The Last Weekend

Script Television

- Frank Deasy – Father & Son (Winner)
  - Frank McGuinness – A Short Stay in Switzerland
  - Eugene O'Brien – Pure Mule – The Last Weekend
  - James Phelan – Rásaí na Gaillimhe

Actor in a Lead Role – Television

  - Brendan Gleeson – Into the Storm (Winner)
- Gabriel Byrne – In Treatment
- Liam Neeson – Five Minutes of Heaven
- Jonathan Rhys Meyers – The Tudors

Actress in a Lead Role – Television

- Elaine Cassidy – Harper's Island (Winner)
  - Ruth Bradley – Rásaí na Gaillimhe
  - Michelle Fairley – Best: His Mother's Son
  - Charlene McKenna – Pure Mule – The Last Weekend

Actor in a Supporting Role – Television

- Stephen Rea – Father & Son (Winner)
  - Declan Conlon – Fair City
  - Diarmuid Noyes – Pure Mule – The Last Weekend
  - Owen Roe – Val Falvey, T.D.

Actress in a Supporting Role – Television

- Sarah Bolger – The Tudors (Winner)
  - Dawn Bradfield – Pure Mule – The Last Weekend
  - Amy Huberman – The Clinic
  - Tatiana Ouliankina – Belonging to Laura

== Television categories ==
Children's / Youth Programme

- On The Block – Tory Island (Winner)
  - Aisling's Diary
  - Ballybraddan
  - Seacht

Current Affairs

- The Frontline (Winner)
  - Paul Williams Investigates: The Battle for the Gasfield
  - Prime Time Investigates: Travellers – On the Edge
  - Spotlight: Stem Cell Tourists

Documentary Series

- Blood of the Irish (Winner)
  - Bóthar go dtí an White House
  - I See A Darkness
  - Teorainn

Single Documentary

- Seamus Heaney: Out Of The Marvellous (Winner)
  - Abuse of Trust: Sins of the Fathers
  - The Forgotten Irish
  - The House

Entertainment Programme

- Apprentice (Winner)
  - The All Ireland Talent Show
  - The Savage Eye
  - Xposé – The Stephen Gately Tribute

News Programme

- TV3 News at 5.30 (Winner)
  - BBC Newsline
  - City Channel News

Factual Programme

- Nightly News with Vincent Browne (Winner)
  - Celebrity Bainisteoir
  - Killers – O'Reilly
  - Welcome to my World

Sports

- Grand Slam Journey (Winner)
  - GAA Beo
  - Pride of The Parish
  - Shay Elliot

== Others ==
Special Irish Language Award

- Rásaí na Gaillimhe (Winner)
  - CSÍ
  - Ros na Rún
  - Seacht

Animation

- The Secret of Kells (Winner)
  - Hasan Everywhere
  - The Polish Language
  - Trolley Boy

Short Film

- Runners (Winner)
  - If I Should Fall Behind
  - Moore Street Masala
  - Sunshower

Rising Star Award

- Tomm Moore
  - Margaret Corkery
  - Darren Healy
  - Brendan Muldowney
  - Robert Sheehan
  - Ken Wardrop

Lifetime Achievement Award

- John Boorman
