= 4th Irish Film & Television Awards =

Annual Irish film and television awards ceremony

- Date: 10 February 2007
- Site: Royal Dublin Society
- Hosted by: Ryan Tubridy

Highlights
- Best Film: The Wind That Shakes the Barley
- Best Actor: Cillian Murphy; Breakfast on Pluto
- Best Actress: Eva Birthistle; Middletown
- Most awards: Breakfast on Pluto (4); Stardust (4)
- Most nominations: Breakfast on Pluto (10)

The 4th Irish Film & Television Awards took place on 10 February 2007 and was hosted by Ryan Tubridy at the Royal Dublin Society Main Hall, Dublin, honouring Irish film and television released in 2006.

== Awards in film ==
Best Film

- The Wind That Shakes the Barley (Winner)
  - Breakfast on Pluto
  - The Front Line
  - Middletown
  - Small Engine Repair

Best International Film

- Little Miss Sunshine (Winner)
  - Babel
  - Casino Royale
  - The Departed
  - United 93

Best Director

- Neil Jordan – Breakfast on Pluto (Winner)
  - John Boorman – In My Country
  - David Gleeson – The Front Line
  - Brian Kirk – Middletown

Best Script

- Neil Jordan & Pat McCabe for Breakfast on Pluto (Winner)
  - Daragh Carville for Middletown
  - David Gleeson for The Front Line
  - Niall Heery for Small Engine Repair

Best Cinematography

- Seamus Deasy for The Tiger's Tail (Winner)
  - Seamus McGarvey for World Trade Center
  - Declan Quinn for Breakfast on Pluto
  - Robbie Ryan for Isolation

Best Music

- Stephen McKeon for The Tiger's Tail (Winner)
  - Niall Byrne for Small Engine Repair
  - Patrick Cassidy for The Front Line
  - Glen Hansard for Once

Best Production Design

- Mark Geraghty for Get Rich or Die Tryin' (Winner)
  - Tom Conroy for Breakfast on Pluto
  - Ashleigh Jeffers for Middletown
  - Mark Lowry for Small Engine Repair

Best Costume Design

- Consolata Boyle for The Queen (Winner)
  - Joan Bergin for The Prestige
  - Eimer Ní Mhaoldomhnaigh for Breakfast on Pluto
  - Maeve Patterson for The Tiger's Tail

Best Hair & Makeup

- Lorraine Glynn, Lynn Johnson for Breakfast on Pluto (Winner)
  - Martina McCarthy, Denise Watson for The Tiger's Tail
  - Morna Ferguson, Lorraine Glynn for Middletown

== Awards in acting ==
Best Actor in a Lead Role – Film

- Cillian Murphy for Breakfast on Pluto (Winner)
  - Pierce Brosnan for The Matador
  - Colin Farrell for Miami Vice
  - Brendan Gleeson for Studs
  - Cillian Murphy for The Wind That Shakes the Barley

Best Actress in a Lead Role – Film

- Eva Birthistle for Middletown
  - Gemma Doorly for A Song For Rebecca
  - Pauline McLynn for Gypo
  - Ruth Negga for Isolation

Best Actor in a Supporting Role – Film

- Liam Cunningham for The Wind That Shakes the Barley (Winner)
  - Pádraic Delaney for The Wind That Shakes the Barley
  - Gerard McSorley for Middletown
  - Stephen Rea for Breakfast on Pluto

Best Actress in a Supporting Role – Film

- Fionnula Flanagan for Transamerica (Winner)
  - Sinéad Cusack for The Tiger's Tail
  - Orla Fitzgerald for The Wind That Shakes the Barley
  - Ruth Negga for Breakfast on Pluto

Best Actor in a Lead Role – Television

- Ciarán Hinds for Rome (Winner)
  - Liam Cunningham for Showbands
  - Michael McElhatton for Hide & Seek
  - James Nesbitt for Murphy's Law

Best Actress in a Lead Role – Television

- Ger Ryan for Stardust (Winner)
  - Ruth Bradley for Legend
  - Anne-Marie Duff for The Virgin Queen
  - Aisling O'Sullivan for The Clinic

Best Actor in a Supporting Role – Television

- Gary Lydon for The Clinic (Winner)
  - Liam Cunningham for Murphy's Law
  - Allen Leech for Legend
  - Christopher O'Dowd for Showbands

Best Actress in a Supporting Role – Television

- Ruth Bradley for Stardust (Winner)
  - Leigh Arnold for The Clinic
  - Gemma Craven for The Clinic
  - Tina Kellegher for Showbands

== Awards in television ==
Best Single Drama/Drama Serial

- Stardust (Winner)
  - Fallout
  - Hide & Seek
  - Legend

Best Drama Series/Soap

- The Clinic (Winner)
  - Murphy's Law
  - Ros na Rún
  - Showbands

Best Current Affairs/News Programme

- Prime Time Investigates: "Sex Traffic" (Winner)
  - BBC Newsline Special: "Death of George Best"
  - Prime Time Investigates: "A National Emergency"
  - Prime Time Investigates: "Homelessness"

Best Children's/Youth

- Aifric (Winner)
  - Dustin's Daily News
  - Trí Shúle an Chait
  - The Ugly Duckling & Me

Best Entertainment

- Naked Camera (Winner)
  - Jokerman: Tommy Tiernan in America
  - The Panel
  - The Podge & Rodge Show

Best Factual Entertainment

- In Search of the Pope's Children (Winner)
  - Des Bishop: Joy in the Hood
  - Rip-Off Republic
  - Wild Trials

Best Sports Feature

- Mícheál: The Sound of Sunday (Winner)
  - Brian Kerr's World Cup Story
  - The Dubs: Story of A Season
  - Leagues Apart with Ardal O'Hanlon

Best Single Documentary

- Flann O'Brien: The Lives of Brian (Winner)
  - The Brothers
  - The Ghosts of Duffy's Cut
  - No Go: The Free Derry Story
  - Tails from America

Best Documentary Series

- The Legend of Liam Clancy (Winner)
  - The Family Silver: "Bawnmore"
  - Junior Doctors
  - Made in America (TV series)|Made in America

Best Irish Language

- Maírtín Ó Cadhain: Rí an Fhocail (Winner)
  - Aifric
  - An Gealigoir Nocht
  - Ros na Rún

== Awards across film and television ==
The IFB & NIFTC Breakthrough Talent Award

- Niall Heery (writer/director) for Small Engine Repair (Winner)
  - Pádraic Delaney (actor) for The Wind That Shakes the Barley
  - Orla Fitzgerald (actress) for The Wind That Shakes the Barley
  - Domhnall Gleeson (actor) for Studs
  - Brian Kirk (director) for Middletown
  - Lucy Kennedy (TV presenter) for The Podge and Rodge Show

Best Editing in Film / TV Drama

- Stephen O'Connell for Stardust (Winner)
  - Dermot Diskinfor Showbands
  - Cúán MacConghail for Studs
  - Ray Roantree for Fallout

Best Sound in Film / TV Drama

- Peter Blayney, Patrick Drummond, John Fitzgerald, Mervyn Moore for Lassie (Winner)
  - Michelle Cunniffe, John Fitzgeral, Nikki Moss, Simon Willis for Middletown
  - Sarah Gaines, Peter Blayney, Jon Stevenson & Dan Birch for Stardust
  - Brendan Deasy for The Tiger's Tail

Best Short Film

- Joyriders (Winner)
  - Bongo Bong
  - The Faeries of Blackheath Woods
  - The White Dress

Best Short Animation

- Horn Ok Please (Winner)
  - Badly Drawn Roy
  - The Faeries of Blackheath Woods
  - The White Dress

== People's choice awards ==
AIB Best Irish Film People's Choice

- The Wind That Shakes the Barley (Winner)
  - Breakfast on Pluto
  - Lassie
  - Studs

Pantene Best International Actress People's Choice

- Helen Mirren for The Queen (Winner)
  - Penélope Cruz for Volver
  - Eva Green for Casino Royale
  - Kate Winslet for The Holiday

Best International Actor People's Choice

- Leonardo DiCaprio for The Departed (Winner)
  - Sacha Baron Cohen for Borat
  - Daniel Craig for Casino Royale
  - Ian McKellen for X-Men: The Last Stand

TV Personality of the Year

- Bill O'Herlihy (Winner)
  - Eamonn Holmes
  - Gerry Kelly
  - Taragh Loughrey Grant
  - Daithí O'Sé

== Lifetime achievement award ==
- Awarded to Gay Byrne

== IFTA Industry Contribution Award ==
- Awarded to Nuala Moiselle
