= Eileen Buggy =

Irish hairstylist

- Born: Dublin, Ireland
- Occupation: Hairstylist
- Years active: 1993–present
- Relatives: Niall Buggy (brother)

Eileen Buggy is an Irish hairstylist who has worked in the film industry since 1993. In addition to being nominated for several other Irish Film & Television Academy Awards (IFTAs), she received awards in the Makeup & Hair category for Ripper Street at the 10th IFTAs and for The Green Knight at the 18th IFTAs.

== Career ==
Buggy has worked with actors such as Anne Hathaway and Martin Sheen; Sheen "personally thanked her for giving him a perm" in Thaddeus O'Sullivan's 2011 film Stella Days.

In 2009, Buggy received a nomination for an Irish Film & Television Award, in the Make-up & Hair category, on George Gently. She also received a nomination for the same award in 2010 for Zonad, and a nomination in 2012 for Stella Days. In 2012, she received an Oscar nomination for the 2011 period drama film Albert Nobbs. At the 2013 British Academy Television Craft Awards, she received a nomination in the Best Make-Up & Hair Design category for her work on Ripper Street. In 2020, at the 16th Irish Film & Television Awards, Buggy received a nomination for her work on Vita & Virginia. In 2022, she won the Makeup & Hair category at the 18th IFTA awards for The Green Knight.

== Personal life ==
Eileen Buggy is the sister of actor Niall Buggy. As of 2013 she was living in Drumcondra, Dublin. She is married with four children.

== Filmography ==
=== Film ===
| Year | Title | Role | Notes |
|---|---|---|---|
| 1993 | In the Name of the Father | Trainee hair stylist | Debut |
| 1994 | Widows' Peak | Trainee hair stylist | |
| 1994 | A Man of No Importance | Assistant hair stylist | |
| 1995 | Nothing Personal | Hair assistant | |
| 1995 | The Bench | Hairstylist / Makeup artist | Film short |
| 1997 | The Butcher Boy | Assistant hair stylist | |
| 1997 | The Boxer | Assistant hair stylist | |
| 1998 | The Nephew | Assistant hair stylist | |
| 1999 | Angela's Ashes | Hairdresser | |
| 2000 | Nora | Hair assistant | |
| 2000 | Mad About Mambo | Key hair stylist | |
| 2000 | An Everlasting Piece | Key hair stylist | |
| 2001 | Disco Pigs | Key hair stylist | |
| 2003 | Mystics | Key hair stylist | |
| 2004 | Ella Enchanted | Hair stylist | |
| 2004 | King Arthur | Hair stylist | |
| 2005 | Boy Eats Girl | Chief hairdresser | |
| 2005 | Isolation | Chief hairdresser | |
| 2005 | Lassie | Chief hairdresser | |
| 2007 | Botched | Chief hairdresser | |
| 2009 | Zonad | Hair stylist | |
| 2009 | Happy Ever Afters | Key hair stylist | |
| 2010 | Snap | Key hair stylist | |
| 2011 | This Must Be the Place | Hairdresser | |
| 2011 | Albert Nobbs | Additional hair stylist | |
| 2011 | Stella Days | Hairdresser | |
| 2012 | Shadow Dancer | Hair designer | |
| 2014 | Frank | Hair designer | |
| 2015 | The Lobster | Hair designer | |
| 2016 | Love & Friendship | Key hair stylist | |
| 2018 | Rebellion | Hair stylist | Film short |
| 2018 | Don't Go | Hair designer | |
| 2018 | Vita & Virginia | Hair designer | |
| 2018 | We Have Always Lived in the Castle | Hair designer | |
| 2019 | The Hole in the Ground | Hair designer | |
| 2020 | Wild Mountain Thyme | Hair designer | |
| 2021 | The Green Knight | Hair designer | |
| 2022 | About Joan | Hair designer | |
| 2022 | Mr. Malcolm's List | Hair designer | |

=== Television ===
| Year | Title | Role | Notes |
|---|---|---|---|
| 1995 | Kidnapped | Assistant hair stylist | Television film |
| 1998 | Amongst Women | Assistant hairdresser | Television mini series |
| 2001 | Ballykissangel | Chief hairdresser | |
| 2002 | Prince William | Hair stylist | |
| 2003 | The Return | Key hair stylist | Television film |
| 2004 | Omagh | Hair stylist | Television film |
| 2006 | Legend | Chief hair stylist | |
| 2006 | Bachelors Walk Christmas Special | Chief hairdresser | |
| 2007 | The Old Curiosity Shop | Hair designer | |
| 2007–09 | Inspector George Gently | Hair designer / Hair stylist | |
| 2008–10 | Raw | Chief hairdresser | |
| 2010 | The Silence | Key hair stylist | Television mini series |
| 2010 | When Harvey Met Bob | Key hair stylist | Television film |
| 2012–14 | Moone Boy | Key hair stylist / Hair designer | |
| 2012–16 | Ripper Street | Hair designer | |
| 2014 | Amber | Key hair stylist | |
| 2014 | Undeniable | Hair designer | |
| 2016 | A Dangerous Fortune | Hair designer | |
| 2018 | Can't Cope, Won't Cope | Hair designer | |
| 2018 | Nightflyers | Hair designer | |
| 2019 | Resistance | Hair designer | Television mini series |
| 2020 | Miss Scarlet and the Duke | Hair designer | |
| 2021 | The Drowning | Hair designer | |
| 2022 | Harry Wild | Hair designer | |
