= Bressan =

Bressan is an Italian surname. Notable people with the surname include:

- Alberto Bressan (born 1956), Italian mathematician
- Arthur J. Bressan Jr. (1943–1987), American filmmaker
- Filippo Maria Bressan (born 1957), Italian conductor
- Gonzalo Bressan (born 2001), Argentine basketball player
- Juliet Bressan, Irish novelist and doctor
- Luigi Bressan (born 1940), Italian prelate of the Catholic Church
- Mauro Bressan (born 1971), Italian retired footballer
- Peter Bressan (1663–1731), French woodwind instrument maker
- Roberto Bressan (born 1960), Italian retired racing cyclist
- Walter Bressan (born 1981), Italian retired footballer

Bressan may also refer to:

- Bressan (footballer) (born 1993), Brazilian footballer

== See also ==
- Matheus Simonete Bressaneli
