= Charlie Casanova =

2011 Irish film

- Theatrical film poster
- Directed by: Terry McMahon
- Written by: Terry McMahon
- Produced by: Terry McMahon
- Starring: Emmett J. Scanlan; Damien Hannaway; Leigh Arnold
- Cinematography: Eoin Macken
- Edited by: Tony Kearns
- Music by: Marc-Ivan O'Gorman
- Release dates: March 14, 2011 (SXSW); May 11, 2012 (Ireland)
- Running time: 94 mins.
- Country: Ireland
- Language: English

Charlie Casanova is a 2011 Irish crime drama film, written, directed, and produced by Terry McMahon. It stars Emmett J. Scanlan, Damien Hannaway, and Leigh Arnold. It premiered at South by Southwest in 2011, before a later release in Ireland and the UK in 2012.

== Synopsis ==
After killing a working-class girl in a hit-and-run, a wealthy sociopath uses a deck of playing cards to determine his fate. He subsequently destroys the lives of those around him.

== Cast ==
- Emmett J. Scanlan as Charlie "Casanova" Barnham
- Damien Hannaway as Kevin
- Leigh Arnold as Una
- Thomas T. Williams as Mick
- Ruth McIntyre as Saoirse
- Anthony Murphy as Donald
- Valerie Bandino as Linda
- Johnny Elliott as Jimmy

== Reception ==
On the review aggregator website Rotten Tomatoes, 13% of 8 critics' reviews are positive, with an average rating of 3.40/10. The film received overwhelmingly negative reviews from critics.

Nevertheless, Kevin Matthews of Flick Feast said Emmett J. Scanlan gives "a superb performance". Adam Woodward of Little White Lies rated it 3/5 stars, but cautioned "it's a trip you'll be reluctant to take twice".

Peter Bradshaw of The Guardian rated it 1/5 stars, chastising the titular character as being "unbearably and unintentionally obnoxious", and that instead of "devilish charm…he is just a tiresome prat". Donald Clarke of The Irish Times complained that Terry McMahon's screenplay is "relentlessly one-note and indigestibly overwritten". Allan Hunter of the Daily Express called the lead character "a loathsome psychopath". Andrew Barker of Variety referred to it as "a punishing experience".

Russell Cook of Cinevue, who rated it 2/5 stars, excoriated the flick for a "plot lacking trajectory or an implausibly purposeless narrative". Trevor Johnston of Time Out rated it 1/5 stars, and summarized "Lots of attitude, little accomplishment." Neil Smith of Total Film dubbed it "a hard slog". And Film4 remarked "Sad, shallow, boring people doing unpleasant things".
