= Orla O'Rourke =

Irish actress

- Born: Zambia
- Occupation: Actress
- Years active: 2004–present

Orla O'Rourke is an Irish actress known for her role in the 2014 film Calvary.

== Early life and education ==
O'Rourke was born in Zambia to Irish parents. Her family returned to Ireland when she was five. At 13, she entered drama school. At 16, she acted in public in Adult Child/ Dead Child. Orla earned a degree in film and broadcasting.

== Career ==
While still studying, O'Rourke began her first regular role as Sinéad Kelly in the television show The Clinic. She then worked on Malice Aforethought for director David Blair. She acted in a first feature film The Front Line, directed by David Gleeson.

After graduation, she worked in England on the TV drama Casualty and the film Harry Brown with Michael Caine, Emily Mortimer, and Charlie Creed-Miles.

== Filmography ==
O'Rourke has acted in the following:

=== Film ===
Year	Title	Role	Notes
2006	The Front Line	Detective Susan Clohessey	
2009	Harry Brown	Nurse #2	
2014	Calvary	Veronica Brennan	
2014	Down Dog	Rachel / Harriet / Flora	
2018	Redcon-1	Miranda	
2020	The Postcard Killings	Nancy	
2020	The Witches	Saoirse	

=== Television ===
Year	Title	Role	Notes
2004–2006	The Clinic	Sinéad Kelly	13 episodes
2005	Malice Aforethought	Gwynfryd Rattery	Television film
2005	Fair City	Avril Winter	3 episodes
2005	Whatever Love Means	Sarah Spencer	Television film
2008	Casualty	WPC Caryn Finnegan	2 episodes
2011	Case Histories	Tatiana	2 episodes
2011	The Cabin	Heather	Television film
2011	Strike Back	Neve	2 episodes
2017	No Offence	Dearbhla Kennedy	Episode #2.1
2020	Doctor Who	Meg	Episode: "Ascension of the Cybermen"
