= Gavin O'Connor =

Gavin O'Connor may refer to:

- Gavin O'Connor (actor) (born 1972), Irish actor
- Gavin O'Connor (filmmaker) (born 1964), American film director, screenwriter, producer, playwright and actor
