= Simon Delaney =

Irish actor (born 1970)

- Born: 2 September 1970 (age 55); Raheny, Dublin, Ireland
- Occupations: Actor; director; presenter
- Years active: 1997–present
- Spouse: Lisa Muddiman (m. 2005)
- Children: 4

Simon Delaney (born 2 September 1970) is an Irish actor, director and presenter. He is known for appearances in a range of films and television series such as RTÉ's comedy-drama Bachelors Walk and CBS' legal drama The Good Wife, and in the films Zonad (2009), Delivery Man (2013) and The Conjuring 2 (2016).

== Personal life ==
Delaney was born on 2 September 1970 in his family home in Raheny, Dublin. His father was a printer, who worked for Smurfit's and was also part of the showband scene of the 1960s, where he played the clarinet and the saxophone. Delaney married Lisa Muddiman in 2005. The couple have four children, Cameron, Elliot, Isaac and Lewis.

== Career ==
Delaney's early work includes being a "Ballydung Player" (one of the actors on A Scare at Bedtime). His first high-profile role was for the RTÉ television series Bachelors Walk as one of three bachelors living together in a flat on the quays in Dublin, which ran from 2001 until 2003 to positive reviews as well as a Christmas special in 2006.

He appeared as Grogan in On the Nose in 2001 along with Dan Aykroyd and Robbie Coltrane. Delaney then starred as the title character in the film Zonad by director John Carney. He gained increased prominence due to a high-profile part in the Tesco Mobile Ireland TV advertising campaign. From 2009 to 2013, Delaney played Bill O'Brien in the cartoon mockumentary Roy, the BAFTA-winning, Irish television series about a cartoon boy.

Delaney appeared in the Irish version of genealogy TV series Who Do You Think You Are?, which was broadcast on RTÉ One on 19 October 2009. In October 2011, Delaney played an Anglo-Hiberno lawyer in CBS's The Good Wife. In January 2012, he appeared in the series Touch. In September 2012, he appeared in the comedy series Moone Boy on Sky 1.

He played, Victor, the brother of the lead Vince Vaughn, in the 2013 film Delivery Man. In 2014, he played the role of Tom Crews in Mrs. Brown's Boys D'Movie. He has also made appearances in the fourth and fifth series of Sky 1 sitcom Trollied, playing the role of Brendan O'Connor. He also toured with Mrs. Brown's Boys in July 2015, with their live show How Now Mrs Brown Cow. He played the role of Dermot whilst Paddy Houlihan was on paternity leave.

Delaney was a judge on the RTÉ reality show Fame: The Musical. In February 2011, Delaney hosted the 8th Irish Film and Television Awards. He also hosted the 9th Irish Film and Television Awards in February 2012.

Simon Dleaney co- hosted Ireland AM on Fridays and Weekend AM on Saturdays and Sundays which eventually became Ireland AM too on Virgin Media One alongside Anna Daly, Laura Woods, and Aidan Power from October 2019- September 2022.

Since leaving Virgin Media Television in September 2022 Delaney has presented various shows for RTÉ. He has also continued his work as a writer, director, actor. He is now also a radio presenter. Since March 2024 Simon has hosted his own Sunday afternoon show on RTÉ Lyric FM. His show on the station is called Sunday Afternoon with Simon Delaney airing weekly from 1:00PM–4:00PM on the station.

== Filmography ==
Note: Feature film, unless otherwise noted

Film and Television
Year(s)	Title	Role	Notes
1998	Mystic Knights of Tir Na Nog	Soldier 1	Episode: "Tyrune Returns", uncredited
2000	The Black Suit	Molloy's Barman	Short film
2000	When the Sky Falls	Sparks Bouncer	
2000	Saltwater	Bouncer Two Darren	
2000	Rat	Bookies Manager	
2000	David Copperfield	Tommy Traddles	TV movie
2000	Paths to Freedom	Prison Officer	2 episodes
2000	An Everlasting Piece	Orderly	
2000	Coolockland	Sgt. Barney Measures	Short film
2001	Custer's Last Stand-up	Security Guard	Episode: "Play It Again, Gem"
2001	Ballykissangel	Jonno Jackson	Episode: "Smoke Signals"
2001	On the Edge	Man in Pub	
2001	On the Nose	Grogan	
2001	Disco Pigs	Ticket Cashier	
2001	The Seventh Stream	Reverend	TV movie
2001–2006	Bachelors Walk	Michael Quinn	Main cast
2003	Hornblower	French Midshipman	Episode: "Loyalty"
2003	The Actors	Ronnie	
2003	Mystics	Feargal	
2003	Intermission	Bill	
2004	The Halo Effect	Rock Steady Eddie	
2004	Pulling Moves	Wardrobe	Main cast
2004	Spin the Bottle	Keith	
2005	The Last Furlong	Diogo Bernardo Furlong	Main cast; also creator and co-writer
2006	The Commander	Tony Leighton	Episode: "Blacklight"
2006	What If	Kevin Green	TV movie
2006	Amazing Grace	Young Parliamentary Officer	
2006	Vicious Circle	Gunner Conway	Short film
2007	The Basket Case	Dell Sweeney	Short film
2009	Zonad	Liam Murphy / Zonad	
2009	Father & Son	George	Limited-run series, main cast
2009	Happy Ever Afters	Dessie	
2009–2015	Roy	Bill O'Brien	Main cast
2010	Rewind	Tony	
2011	This Must Be the Place	Jeffery	
2011	The Good Wife	Timothy Ash Brannon	Episode: "The Death Zone"
2012	Touch	Niles Borne	Episode: "Pilot"
2012–2015	Moone Boy	Gerry Bonner	6 episodes
2013	The Fall	Jerry McElroy	Recurring role (series 1)
2013	Alan Partridge: Alpha Papa	Don	
2013	Begin Again	Lawyer	
2013	Father Figure	Roni Broad	Episode: "House Husband of the Year"
2013	Delivery Man	Victor Wozniak	
2014	Mrs. Brown's Boys D'Movie	Tom Crews	
2014	Tales of Irish Castles	Self, Narrator	Documentary series
2014–2018	Trollied	Brendan O'Connor	4 episodes
2015	Spiders Trap	Security Guard	
2016	The Conjuring 2	Vic Nottingham	
2017	Coronation Street	Phil Weeler	2 episodes
2018	Damo & Ivor The Movie	Tricky Dicky	
2018	Don't Go	Father Sean	
2020	Emmerdale	DS Ward	8 episodes
2020	Young Wallander	Nicholas	1 episode
2021	Modern Love	John Flynn	Episode: "On a Serpentine Road, With the Top Down"
2022	FBI: International	Chief Burke	Episode: "Close to the Sun"
2022	That Dirty Black Bag	Frank	4 episodes
2022	Inside Man	Claude Kleiner	1 episode
2023	The Woman in the Wall	Sergeant Aidan Massey	Main cast
2024	Role Play	Toby Berman	
2025	Lockerbie: A Search for Truth	Bert Ammerman	Limited-run series, recurring role
2025	Blue Moon	Oscar Hammerstein II	
2025	Small Town, Big Story	Driver Dan	Episode: "The White Ridge"
2025	Mrs. Brown's Boys	Rodger	Episode: "The Mammy Effect"
2026	Young Sherlock	Detective Fitget	2 episodes
2026	Shedites	Gavin	TV special
