= Deception (Irish TV series) =

2013 Irish drama TV series

- Genre: Drama, Mystery
- Created by: Gert Thomas
- Directed by: Liz Gill; Anna McCabe
- Country of origin: Ireland
- Original language: English
- No. of seasons: 1
- No. of episodes: 6

Production
- Executive producers: Marie Ní Thuathail; Patricia Carroll; Ben Frow; Fintan Maguire
- Running time: 42 minutes

Original release
- Network: TV3
- Release: 7 January 2013 – present

Deception is an Irish prime time television drama airing on TV3. The series, created by Gert Thomas, premiered on Monday 7 January 2013.

== Plot ==
A small housing estate in the suburbs of Galway was built in 2007. The six families that live there have plenty of secrets, with jealousy, betrayal, revenge, and murder behind every door.

== Cast ==
- Vincent Walsh as Andrew Stacey
- Nora-Jane Noone as Aoife Stacey
- Kris Edlund as Ann Baker
- Colm O'Maonlaí as Dara Baker
- Danny McColgan as Troy Baker
- Conor Mullen as Jack French
- Leigh Arnold as Caitríona French
- Imogen Reinhardt as Jade French
- Gavin O'Connor-Duffy as Owen French
- Cora Fenton as Colleen Walsh
- Roisín O'Neill as Emma Walsh
- Eve Mackin as Fiona Woods
- Jim Norton as Larry Joyce
- Sam Smith as Michael Joyce
- Helen Roache as Rose Joyce
- Robbie Walsh as Manga
- Michael Murphy as Zoo
- Jack Harney as Rory
- Meabh Coyne as Molly

== Production ==
Deception is TV3's first original series which they are also producing. The six episode first series was filmed on a semi-ghost estate in Galway that already reflected "life in post-Celtic Tiger Ireland." The series cost €1.2 million with half of the funding coming from the Broadcasting Authority of Ireland's Sound and Vision Fund.

== Episodes ==
No.	Title	Directed by	Written by	Original release date
1	"Looking After Number One"	Liz Gill	Paul Walker	7 January 2013
2	"To Protect and Serve"	Anne McCabe	Ailbhe Nic Giolla Bhrighde	14 January 2013
3	"Hidden"	Liz Gill	Ted Gannon	21 January 2013
4	"Practice to Deceive"	Anne McCabe	Len Colin	28 January 2013
5	"Happy Loving Couples"	Liz Gill	Christian O'Reilly	4 February 2013
6	"The Rising"	Unknown	Unknown	11 February 2013
