= Ger Ryan =

Irish film and television actress

Ger Ryan is an Irish film and television actress, whose credits include Queer as Folk, Family, The War of the Buttons, The Van, Moll Flanders, Intermission and Little Dog.

== Career ==
Ryan has twice been nominated for a Royal Television Society Award for Family and Amongst Women, and received several nominations in the Irish Film and Television Awards, including for Amongst Women, Intermission and The Return. She is also a recipient of a Belfast Telegraph EMA Award in for her work on A Place with the Pigs and Song of the Yellow Bittern. In 2007, she received an IFTA for her work on the two-part docu-drama, Stardust, by RTÉ. She also played Margie McEvoy in the BBC drama series, The Street. She later played the role of Maeve Harte in RTÉ's drama series, Raw, and that of Mary Carroll in the 2013 romantic comedy, The Callback Queen.

== Filmography ==
=== Film ===
Year	Title	Role	Notes
1988	The Courier	Assistant in Jewellers	
1991	The Commitments	Pawnbroker	
1994	War of the Buttons	Fergus' Mum	
1996	The Van	Maggie	
1996	Moll Flanders	Orphanage Woman	
1997	Driftwood	Woman	
1999	A Love Divided	Anna Walsh	
2003	Intermission	Maura	
2005	Frozen	Elsie	
2007	Exodus	Batya Mann	
2008	Dorothy	Eileen McMahon	
2009	Happy Ever Afters	Bridie	
2010	Five Day Shelter	Jackie	
2012	Keys to the City	Jo	
2013	Hummingbird	Mother Superior	
2013	The Callback Queen	Mary Carroll	
2013	The Food Guide to Love	Anna	
2014	Love, Rosie	Alice Dunne	
2017	The Man Who Invented Christmas	Mrs. Dickens	
2019	Rialto	Kathleen	

=== Television ===
Year	Title	Role	Notes
1989	Fair City	Bernie Kelly	Episode #1.1
1994	Family	Paula Spencer	4 episodes
1996	Kavanagh QC	Maggie Warwick	Episode: "A Sense of Loss"
1997	Plotlands	Grainne Mulligan	6 episodes
1998	Amongst Women	Rose	4 episodes
1999	Oliver Twist	Mrs Sowerberry	1 episode
1999, 2000	Queer as Folk	Margaret Jones	2 episodes
2000	Forgive and Forget	Ruth O'Neil	Television film
2000	Deceit	Molly Sinclair	2 episodes
2000–2005	Fat Friends	Aisling Rymer	3 episodes
2001	Shades	Efa Sullivan	Episode #1.2
2001–2002	On Home Ground	Maureen Fitzpatrick	5 episodes
2002	No Tears	Siobhan Cassidy	Miniseries
2002	Clocking Off	Maggie / Shirley	Episode: "Gary's Story"
2002	Sinners	Niamh	Television film
2003	The Clinic	Ann Connell	Episode #1.6
2003	The Return	Maggie Lynch	Television film
2005	Malice Aforethought	Constance Torr	Television film
2006	Stardust	Christine Keegan	2 episodes
2006–2009	The Street	Margie McEvoy	6 episodes
2007	Damage	Liz Maher	Television film
2007	Prosperity	Vera	2 episodes
2010–2013	Raw	Maeve Harte	18 episodes
2011	The Body Farm	Teresa Quinn	Episode #1.6
2012	Hit & Miss	Claire	Episode #1.6
2018–2019	Little Dog	Sylvia Ross	15 episodes
2020	The South Westerlies	Noreen	6 episodes
2021	Three Families	Kathleen Nolan	2 episodes
