= Turning Green =

- Directed by: Michael Aimette; John G. Hofmann
- Written by: Michael Aimette; John G. Hofmann
- Starring: Donal Gallery; Killian Morgan
- Distributed by: New Films International
- Release date: 2005
- Countries: Ireland; United States

Turning Green is a 2005 black comedy film written and directed by Michael Aimette and John G. Hofmann. The script was a runner-up in the original Project Greenlight on HBO. Donal Gallery stars as James Powers, a displaced American teenager living in Ireland in 1979 who discovers girlie magazines on a random trip to London. He illegally imports magazines, changing his fortunes and perspective on life in Ireland. The tagline for the film is "Turning Green. The tale of a boy, a country, and a box of porn."

As one of the first movies to receive a domestic theatrical release by New Films International, it screened in Los Angeles (November 6, 2009), New York City (November 13, 2009) and Chicago (November 20, 2009).

The title Turning Green refers to many themes of the film, both physical (James becoming sick after performing one of his drinking bar tricks, converting Irish pounds to American dollars) and metaphorical (James unwittingly becoming more Irish.)

Turning Green received positive reviews from the Los Angeles Times, The New York Times, Variety, NPR and The Star-Ledger among others.

== Plot ==
Sixteen-year-old, American-born James Powers hates his life in Ireland. Six years prior, after his mother died, his father shipped him and his little brother Pete (Killian Morgan) off to rural Ireland to live with his three aunts. Bored, depressed and xenophobic James drops out of school and spends his days yearning to get back to his idealized United States. For James, getting back to the U.S. is an improbable prospect. He tries to make money, little by little, to return to New York City – making small bar bets and working for the local bookie, Bill the Bookie, played by Alessandro Nivola. When Bill doesn't get the money owed to him, Bill the Breaker, played by Timothy Hutton, is sent instead to get the money with violence. Despite his failure Bill the Bookie prefers James, and takes a shine to the clever and resourceful young man.

James has just two friends. The first is his younger brother Pete, who has assimilated much better into Irish life than his older sibling. James' other friend is Tom (Colm Meaney), the gruff-yet-affectionate fisherman and frequently unsuccessful gambler. He sells his boat to pay his gambling debt, giving James the cash to pay off the debt. James has the ability to read between the lines of Tom's grouchy commentary, and sees the good in him. Tom in turn, is a rather faulty father figure to the directionless James.

James also pines for the cutest girl in town, Fiona, who may or may not know he even exists. Lacking confidence, he keeps his distance. Meanwhile, based on the excessive amount of time James spends locked in the bathroom, his naive aunts fear that he might be ill.

In a fortuitous moment, the aunts send James to London for a few days to see a medical specialist. There, he discovers his possible ticket out of Ireland – pornography. Illegal in Ireland, James strikes a deal with a local London newsagent to import them to his town and, using his connections made working for Bill, sells them to an eager Irish audience. To pay for them, he uses money that Tom gave him to repay his debt to Bill. This sets up conflict as Bill always demands payment on time.

Upon his return to Ireland a few days later, James meets up with the two Bills and they discuss business. In the racetrack toilet, Bill the Bookie asks James repeatedly if he had collected any money before he left. James, fully aware that he used Tom's money to buy the magazines, lies and says no. With that, Bill the Breaker suddenly attacks and beats the unsuspecting James. Bill the Bookie knew very well that Tom's money was supposed to come to him, but somehow hadn't. The beating serves as a warning to James to watch his step.

James immediately runs over to Tom's, who has also been beaten up by Bill. Tom banishes James from his house. Now, James is more alone than ever. James fantasizes that one of the girls in the magazine is talking to him, as she cajoles him to sell the magazines and then sell some more. Determined more than ever to pay back Bill, James finally receives his shipment of magazines and sells them all in one day. This leads him to expand his business – from approaching local merchants to selling them to other local towns. As his business booms. James feels he's actually helping Ireland, he's liberating them, inspiring them. "Like Michael Collins, Éamon de Valera. Or that guy from Thin Lizzy."

As he gets closer to a possible escape from Ireland, his perspective on the country changes. He even seems to be enjoying life for the first time in years. He finally strikes up the nerve to ask Fiona out on a date. He buys Tom a bigger boat. Even the aunts seem more tolerable. Meanwhile, Bill the Bookie has been wondering where this glut of illegal magazines has come from. Learning that the magazines are coming from London, Bill figures out that James is the one who is cutting into his underground business as he the only one smart enough to do it.

And just as James is about to reverse course on his skewed vision of Ireland, Bill steps in. The two Bills take James to the top of the cliff, which leads to an ironic and wistful conclusion.

== Cast ==
- Timothy Hutton as Bill the Breaker
- Alessandro Nivola as Bill the Bookie
- Colm Meaney as Tom
- Deirdre Monaghan as Aunt Maggie
- Frank Kelly as Father O'Hara
- Donagh Deeney as Mickey
- Gavin O'Connor as Postal worker
- Jer O'Leary as Timmy
- Kevin Currid as Barry
- Sinead C. Kavanagh as Bra ad model
- Karl Dawson as Teen buying magazine
- Glenn Gannon as Man in the street (uncredited)
- John Shevlin as Bully (uncredited)

== Themes ==
Like many coming of age stories, Turning Green is about a young man learning about himself. In this case, it's more than a fish out of water story, but a fish out of two waters – Ireland and America. James is teetering on the cusp of adulthood and childhood, between his homeland and his adopted one, and deciding where his future lies. He refers to himself not as "Irish American" but "Irish American Irish." This constant flip-flopping has left him unsure of who he is and where he belongs. As his lot in life changes, James has to decide where home really is – a place or really just a state of mind.

It's also a story about a point of view. James has almost spitefully decided to hate Ireland and idealize America. As he's just 16, he's lived only 10 years in the U.S. and 6 in Ireland, hardly enough time for him to really relate to either. Additionally, in the 6 years there, he's inadvertently developed an Irish accent. It's clear to us that he's much more Irish than he'd like to admit.

He's also plagued by a none-too-healthy imagination, which only skews his perspective further. He has visions of nude women talking to him, urging him to sell the magazines in Ireland. His perspective on the aunts makes them almost cartoonish – they're really only as annoying as he makes them out to be. He's convinced himself that his brother wants to leave Ireland too, although that's obviously not true. And when the two Bills take James up to the cliffs to teach him a final lesson, it's not nearly as climactic as James has led himself to believe.

== Production ==
=== Development ===
Michael Aimette and John G. Hofmann first co-wrote the script and submitted it to the first season of HBO's TV series Project Greenlight, which was created to give first-time writers a chance to direct their own film. The script made the final round of 30 and from that, gave the script greater exposure in Hollywood. After two years of development, the script was optioned by the NY-based independent production company Curbside Productions, and principal photography began in 2005. After completing a rough cut, the film premiered at CineVegas film festival to positive reviews.

However, unhappy with the producer's cut and how the film was being marketed, Aimette and Hofmann created a director's cut which is more comedic and with a different ending. The new version of the film was screened at The Craic Film Festival in 2007 and won the Audience Award.

In 2009, New Films International made their foray into the US domestic distribution market and Turning Green received a limited release in New York, Los Angeles and Chicago in November, 2009. New Films opted for the original cut of the movie, due to the expense of re-finishing the directors' version.

=== Casting ===
Casting the role of James was essential, as he appears in virtually every scene of the movie. After a few weeks of unsuccessfully searching for the perfect balance between adult and child, the 17-year-old Donal Gallery auditioned for the role. He was given the role of James Powers on the spot. Never having acted professionally before, Gallery's performance was subsequently greeted with terrific reviews. The New York Times praised Gallery for his "cheeky charm" while Variety called him "an impressive newcomer."

The American actor Alessandro Nivola is cast as Bill the Bookie, who brought a fey, soft-accented element to what could have been a typical "bad guy" role. Another American, Timothy Hutton, is almost unrecognizable as Bill the Breaker, and he embraced the role of gruff Irish enforcer fully. Colm Meaney, a celebrity throughout Ireland, was cast as James' only friend Tom. The remainder of the cast is 100% Irish, featuring screen and stage actors from Dublin and its environs.

=== Filming ===
The budget of US$400,000 includes all cast and crew, and was shot on the east coast of Ireland, primarily Wicklow, Rathdrum and Ardmore Studios outside of Dublin. The final scene where James is now working at a bar in America was shot in New York, NY.

There was minimal rehearsal, and filming spanned 20 days during the summer. It was shot on a 24p high-definition camera. The opening animated sequence, which tells the story of James and Pete and their metaphorical journey from America to Ireland, was created by Phil Jungmann, an advertising creative director and friend of the directors. Using Jungmann's illustrations and created in Flash, the animated James and Pete take a subway ride in New York. When the doors finally open, they're magically released into the Irish wilderness, left alone on a giant cliff looking out into the endless sea, their old homeland beyond their grasp.

=== Music ===
The movie features indie music artists that, while not from the 1970s period, reflect the mood of the film and James' dour view of the place. Nada Surf, Iron & Wine, the Caesars, Arco and Brian Seymour all contributed, and the commercial music company Pull scored the film. The original script had references to 1970s artists Queen, ELO, Led Zeppelin among others, but due to budgetary constraints, their inclusion was not possible.

== Reception ==
Turning Green received many positive reviews, as well as some mixed reviews. Kevin Thomas from the Los Angeles Times called it "an amusing Irish coming-of-age story...when all those triple-X magazines spread throughout the community, Turning Green takes off in earnest." NPR's Mark Jenkins felt it was "enlivened by witty asides and playful commentary" and praised Aimette and Hofmann that "for a couple of Yanks making their first feature, they've drawn a perceptive sketch of the Old Sod." Stephen Holden's review in The New York Times was largely positive as well, calling it "whimsical" but noting that the story's ending left the movie "stranded in the wilderness." Stephen Whitty of The Star-Ledger said "as the debut film from a couple of new directors, it's an encouraging start" and Variety's Robert Koehler dubbed it "a tart comedy...empowered and alive" before succumbing to "uneven drama." In general, the reviews were positive, and the negatives are primarily based on the very ending of the movie, which Aimette and Hofmann both felt deviated from the tone and humor of the rest of the movie.

The film was released on DVD in early 2010.
