= Gavin O'Connor (actor) =

Irish actor

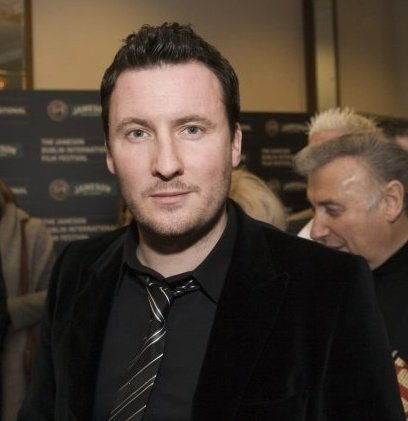
- Born: Cork, Ireland
- Occupations: Actor, Author
- Years active: 1996–present

Gavin O'Connor is an Irish actor who has had roles in TV series such as The Hunt for Raoul Moat, Vikings: Valhalla, The Alienist, Taken Down, Charlie, North Sea Connection, The Tudors, Single Handed and films including Dorothy Mills (2008), The Front Line (2006), Headrush (2003) and This Is My Father (1998), This Must Be The Place (2011) and Fifty Dead Men Walking (2008).

O'Connor's first novel, MOJO, was released on Amazon in 2019.

== Biography ==
Born in Cork, O'Connor trained at the Samuel Beckett Centre in Trinity College Dublin.

=== Career ===
O'Connor made his professional acting debut in Pat McCabe's Loco County Lonesome at Dublin's Olympia Theatre in September 1994. His on-screen debut came in the film The Informant (1997). O'Connor plays a younger version of the Earl of Shrewsbury in the third series of Michael Hirst's hit television series The Tudors, first aired on 5 April 2009 in the United States on Showtime, and August 2009 in the United Kingdom on BBC2.

His first film as writer/actor/producer Blink was nominated in World Competition at the Montreal World Film Festival.

In 2015, he played the former Minister for Justice Seán Doherty in RTÉ's Charlie. In 2016, he played Patrick Pearse in The Bloody Irish for PBS, and in 2018 he played Mackin in RTE's drama Taken Down.

As a voice over-artist, he has voiced several ad campaigns, animated series (such as Galactik Football and The Mad Cows) and computer games like Dreamfall: The Longest Journey. In the latter he voiced one of the lead characters, Kian Alvane.

== Filmography ==
=== Film ===
- Don't Go (2018)
- The Belly Of The Whale (Director Wishes To Thank) (2018)
- While You Were Gone (Writer, Producer)
- Blink (2013)
- This Must Be the Place (2011)
- Fifty Dead Men Walking (2008)
- Dorothy Mills (2008)
- Eden (2008)
- The Front Line (2006)
- Turning Green (2005)
- RoseBud (2004)
- Headrush (2003)
- This Time Round (2001)
- Mad About Mambo (2000)
- When the Sky Falls (2000)
- The Black Suit (2000)
- Boat Racing (1999)
- This Is My Father (1998)
- The Informant (1997)
- Fanatic (1997)
- Bloodlines: Legacy of a Lord (1997)
- The Boys of Barr na Sráide (1996)

=== Television ===
- Irish Blood Sergeant Claude
- The Hunt for Raoul Moat Steve Neill
- Vikings: Valhalla Earl of East Anglia
- North Sea Connection Bryan
- The Alienist Murphy
- Taken Down (2018) Mackin
- The Bloody Irish (2016) Patrick Pearse
- Charlie (2015)
- Titanic: Blood & Steel (2012)
- Rasaí na Gaillimhe 2 (2012)
- The Mad Cows (2011)
- Single Handed (2010)
- The Tudors (2009)
- Rasaí na Gaillimhe (2009)
- Showbands II (2007)
- Teenage Cics (2006)
- Stardust (2006)
- Galactik Football (2006)
- Showbands (2005)
- The Blizzard of Odd (2001)
- Rí Rá (2001)
- The Ambassador (1998)

=== Theatre ===
- The Bloody Irish, (Patrick Pearse), The Helix
- Borstal Boy, (Joe da Vinci), Gaiety Theatre, Dublin
- A Woman of No Importance, Abbey Theatre, Dublin
- Loco Country Lonesome (Packo), Olympia Theatre, Dublin
- Hamlet (Laertes), Riverbank Theatre, Dublin
- The Crucible (Danforth), Beckett Centre, Ireland
- Picnic (Hal), Focus Theatre, Ireland
- I Like Armadillos (Sean), Andrews Lane, Dublin
