= Alana Henderson =

Musician, singer and songwriter from Northern Ireland

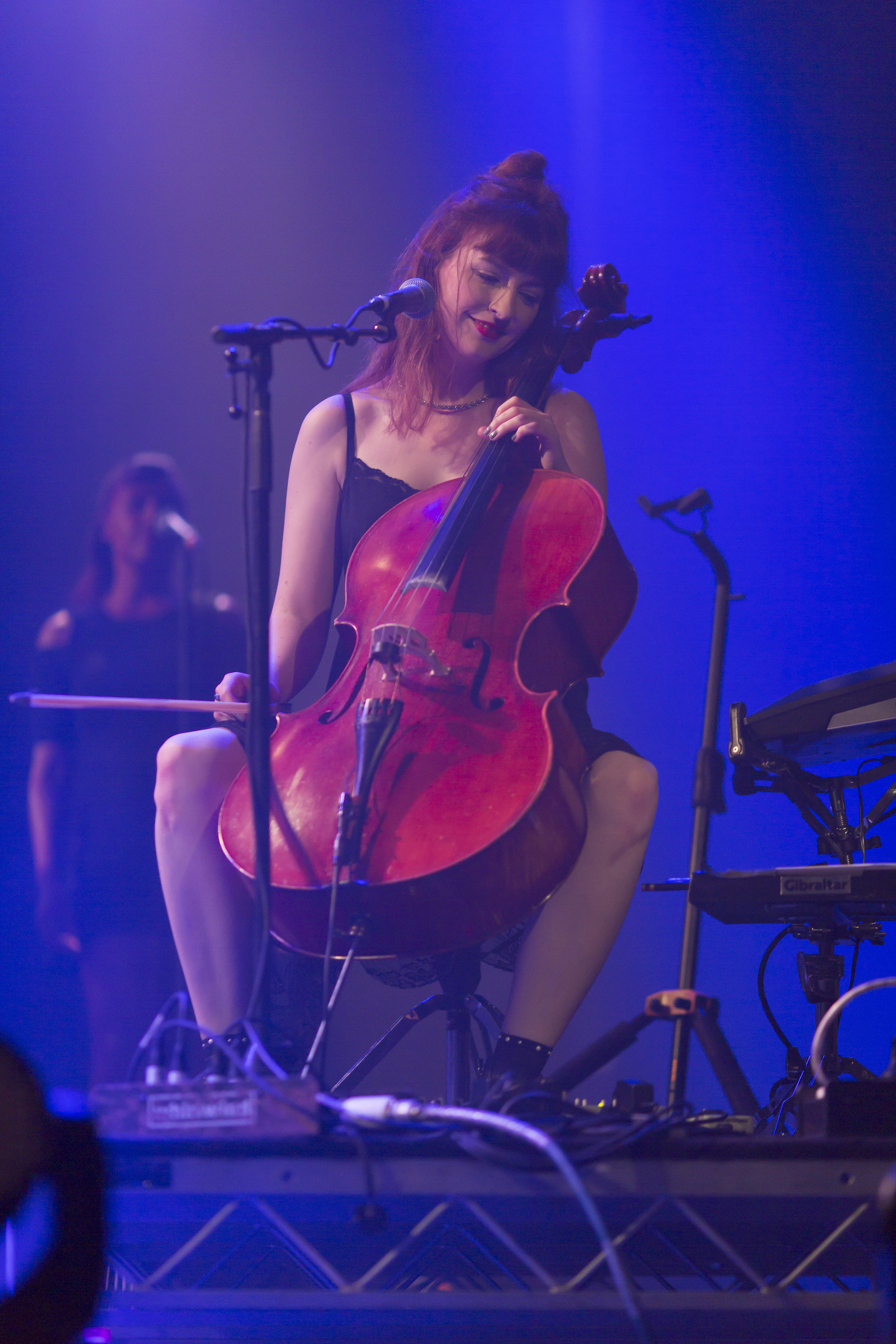
- Alana at Byron Bay Bluesfest in 2015

Background information
- Born: Alana Henderson; 6 October 1988 (age 38); Dungannon, County Tyrone, Northern Ireland
- Genres: Indie folk; folk; Irish folk; Irish Traditional Music
- Occupations: Musician; singer; songwriter; cellist
- Instruments: Vocals; cello; ukulele
- Years active: 2013–present
- Website: alanahenderson.com

Alana Henderson (born 6 October 1988), is a Northern Irish musician, cellist, singer and songwriter from Dungannon. She released her debut EP, Wax & Wane in 2013, and her single, Let This Remain, in 2017. She is now living in Belfast.

== Early life ==
Alana Henderson was born in Dungannon, Northern Ireland. With her family from County Armagh, Alana grew up in a very music-friendly environment, and started singing and dancing from a very young age. Alana attended St Patrick's Academy, Dungannon and picked up cello there. Alana studied Law at Queen's University, Belfast, determined to become a lawyer, but in her words, "Law was incredibly dry, quite boring and I really began to feel frustrated and so I started songwriting." After completing the degree, she eventually left to become a singer-songwriter, just before her solicitor apprenticeship started.

== Music career ==
=== 2013: Wax & Wane ===
On 11 March 2013, Alana released her debut EP Wax & Wane, which also included "Song about a Song", "The Tower", and "Two Turtle Doves". The EP got generally positive views, including Lee Gorman of The Thin Air Magazine saying "an immensely promising first effort, which marks Alana Henderson out as one to watch".

In 2013, Alana joined The Jepettos, a Northern Irish alternative band, in their single, "Water".

=== 2014-2016: Windfall, Touring with Hozier ===
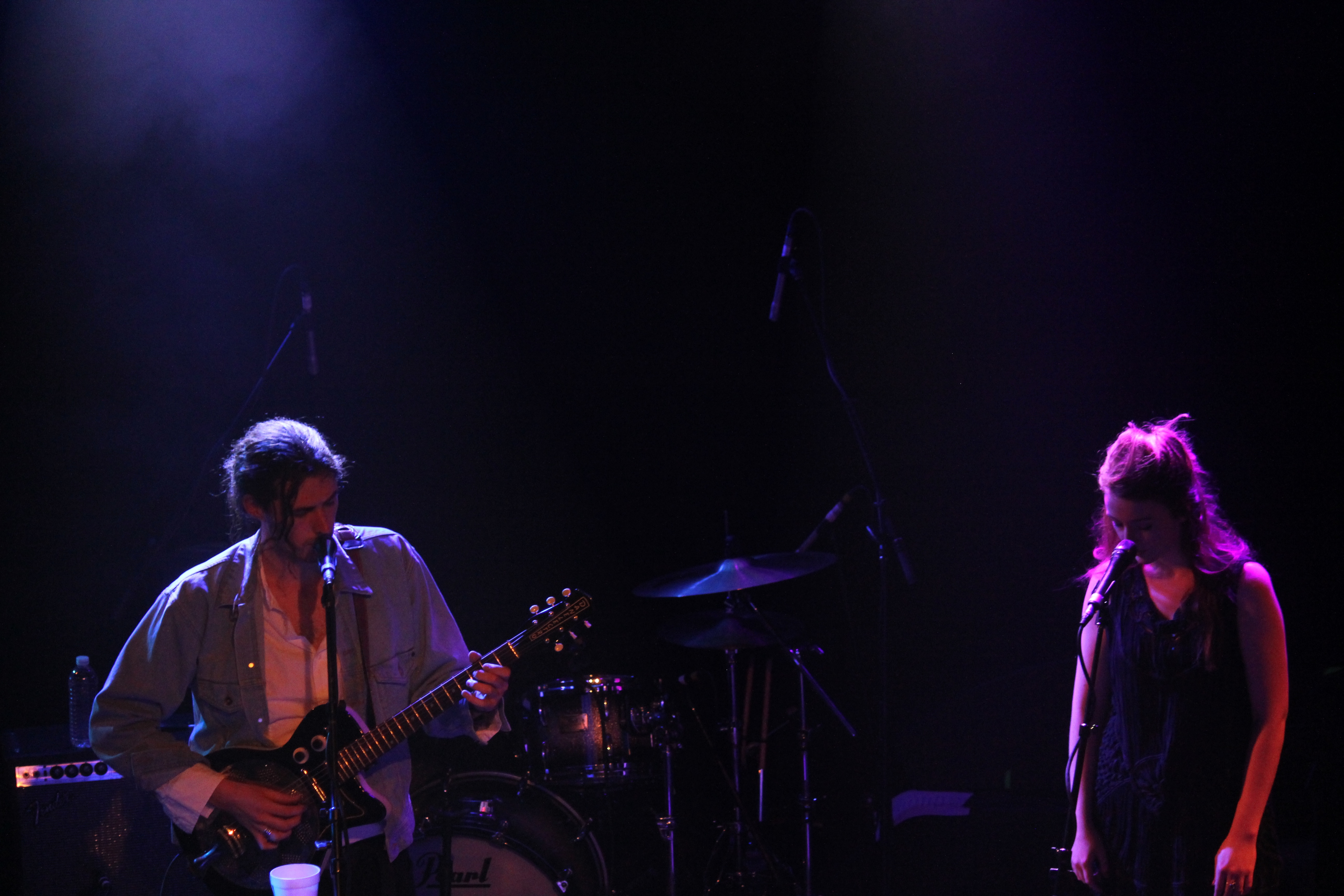
Hozier and Alana Henderson at the Troubadour in West Hollywood

On 20 February 2014, Alana released an album called Windfall, which is "a side–project, separate from my own contemporary writing, in which I recorded an album of re–worked, contemporary arrangements of traditional songs from the North of Ireland", according to her own words. The album was shortlisted for the Northern Ireland Music Prize in 2014. Windfall is currently not available on iTunes.

Alana accompanied Hozier, an Irish singer-songwriter, on cello and vocals from late 2014 to early 2016. Together with Hozier, she played at over 300 shows, including Glastonbury, Saturday Night Live, Jools Holland, and a Grammy performance joined by Annie Lennox. Apart from cello, Alana joined the duet with Hozier for his song "In a Week" on tour, when Karen Cowley, the original singer of the song, was not present. During the tour, Alana occasionally performed her original songs as an opening act for Hozier. In July 2015, Alana played a stripped back folk set with Hozier in Newport Folk Festival, which was "a highlight of the tour" for her.

=== 2017: Let This Remain ===
On 27 October 2017, Alana released her single "Let This Remain", which was her first musical release after 2 years of touring. In 2017, Alana recorded a duet song "Holllllogram" with Joshua Burnside, a Belfast-based singer-songwriter. The song was tracked in his debut album, EPHRATA.

== Acting career ==
In 2007, Alana starred in Seacht, which was an Irish language television soap opera, and was broadcast by TG4 and BBC Two Northern Ireland. She starred as Caroline, a singing cello player.

== Discography ==
Alana Henderson discography
- Studio albums: 1
- EPs: 1
- Singles: 1
- Music videos: 2

=== Studios ===
Year	EP details	Peak chart positions
Year	EP details	UK
2013	Windfall: Released: 20 February 2014; Label: N/A; Format: CD, Download	—

=== Extended plays ===
Year	EP details	Peak chart positions
Year	EP details	UK
2013	Wax & Wane: Released: 11 March 2013; Label: N/A; Format: CD, Download	—
2019	Museum Released: 18 October 2019	

=== Singles ===
Year	Title	Chart Positions			Album
Year	Title	UK	IRL	UK Indie	Album
2017	"Let This Remain"	—	—	—	-
"—" denotes that a title did not chart.

=== Music videos ===
Year	Title	Director
2014	"Wax & Wane"	Angus Mitchell
2017	"Let This Remain"	Aislínn Clarke
