= Emmett J. Scanlan =

Irish actor (born 1979)

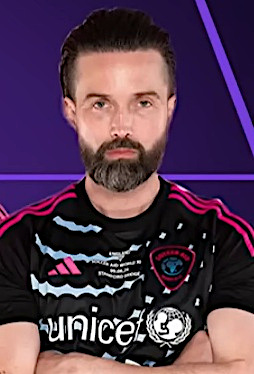
- Scanlan Soccer Aid for UNICEF 2024
- Born: Emmett John Scanlan; 31 January 1979 (age 47); Clontarf, Dublin, Ireland
- Occupation: Actor
- Years active: 2004–present
- Spouse: Claire Cooper (m. 2015)
- Children: 3

Emmett John Scanlan (born 31 January 1979) is an Irish actor, known for playing villainous, bad boy characters. His credits include Hollyoaks (2011–2013), The Fall (2013–2014), Peaky Blinders (2019–2022), Breakdown (2016), In The Flesh (2014), Guardians of the Galaxy (2014), The Tower (2021), Ten Percent (2022), Kin (2021–2023), Fool Me Once (2024), MobLand (2025), and How to Get to Heaven from Belfast (2026).

== Early life ==
Scanlan was born on 31 January 1979, in Dublin. His family are natives of Clontarf, Dublin.

== Career ==
He played the lovable rogue and bad boy Brendan Brady in Hollyoaks from 2010 to 2013, for which he was nominated and won many soap awards. He appeared alongside Gillian Anderson and Jamie Dornan in the BBC Two drama The Fall (2013–2014).

From 2013–2016, he starred alongside Cillian Murphy in Peaky Blinders, Series 5 and Series 6, and worked alongside Craig Fairbrass, James Cosmo, Bruce Payne, Olivia Grant and Tamer Hassan in Breakdown (2016),.

Scanlan has acted in BBC Three's In The Flesh series 2, and Guardians of the Galaxy (2014). In 2021, he starred as Inspector Kieran Shaw in ITV's The Tower.

In 2022, Scanlan appeared as Marcus MacLeod in the British remake of Call My Agent!: Ten Percent. He played a main role as Jimmy Kinsella in the RTÉ family gangster drama Kin.

In 2024, he starred alongside Michelle Keegan and Adeel Akhtar in the Netflix series Fool Me Once (2024), and worked alongside Pierce Brosnan, Helen Mirren, Tom Hardy, Paddy Considine and Joanne Froggatt, playing a heavy for the Harrigan family in the British Gangster series MobLand (2025).

== Personal life ==
Scanlan has a daughter from an early relationship, born in September 2002. He married girlfriend Claire Cooper on 31 December 2015 in New York City. In July 2020, she gave birth to a boy. In October 2020, Cooper disclosed that she had suffered a miscarriage of their baby the previous year. On 12 November 2022, Cooper gave birth to their daughter.

For a period of time whilst filming Hollyoaks, Scanlan lived with friend and then-co star Joe Tracini. Tracini has credited Scanlan with helping him through his addiction issues, and addressed Scanlan's support during his 2026 comedy tour 10 Things I Hate About Me.

Scanlan is a vegan and supports PETA. He is a supporter of Manchester United. He chose to support Manchester United due to his father's admiration for Irish footballer Kevin Moran.

== Filmography ==
=== Film ===
Year	Title	Role	Notes
2006	Triple Bill	Jack	Short
2006	Studs	Jake	
2006	Mebollix	Copier man	Short
2007	Shattered	Matt Connolly	
2008	Christian Blake	Floyd	
2008	Anton	Prison Officer McMahon	
2008	Freakdog	Stranger	
2008	Colour From The Dark	Luigi	
2008	The Bet	Anthony	
2008	Pass Them On	James Collins	Short
2009	Savage	Gym changing room guy 1	
2009	The Rise of the Bricks	Ste	
2009	3 Crosses	Jonnie Linski	
2010	Lapse	Guy	Post-Production
2010	BLOOD	Guy	
2010	Imperfect Couple	Him	Short
2010	Glassjaw	Christian Connolly	Short
2011	Charlie Casanova	Charlie Barnum	
2011	Legends of Valhalla: Thor	Sindri	Voice
2011	Analogue Love	Guy	Short
2012	Black Coffee	Him	Short
2012	The Inside	Hughie	
2012	Big Top	Lead role	Short
2013	Personal Appearance	Lead role	Short Film
2014	Patrick's Day	Concierge	Post-Production
2014	Guardians of the Galaxy	Head Riot Guard	
2016	Breakdown	Connor Moran	
2018	In the Cloud	Alfie	
2020	Here Are the Young Men	Homeless man	
2021	Lapwing	David	
2024	Argylle	Handsome man	
2025	A Working Man	Viper	
2026	In the Grey	Mick dunne	

=== Television ===
Year	Title	Role	Notes
2004	The Big Bow Wow	Robert	3 episodes
2007	Paddywhackery	Stephen	2 episodes
2008	The Roaring Twenties	Pierre Leguin	3 episodes
2008–2009	The Clinic	Jimmy Rice	2 episodes
2009	Marú	John Cousins	Episode: "The Murder of John Cousins"
2009	The Phone	The Operator	6 episodes
2009	Mattie	Paul	Episode: "The Pilot"
2010	The Guards	Diarmuid O'Briain	2 episodes
2010	Mariana	Leonard Dalton	2 episodes
2010	Hollyoaks: King of Hearts	Brendan Brady	1 episode
2010–2013	Hollyoaks	Brendan Brady	Regular role; 340 episodes
2012	Hollyoaks Later	Brendan Brady	5 episodes
2013–2016	The Fall	D.C. Glenn Martin	Series 1 (4 episodes; recurring); Series 2 (5 episodes; main); Series 3 (main)
2014	In the Flesh	Simon	6 episodes
2014	Atlantis	Delmos	3 episodes
2014–2015	Constantine	Jim Corrigan	2 episodes
2015	A.D. The Bible Continues	Saul of Tarsus	6 episodes
2015	No Offence	Andrew Curtis	8 Part series
2016	Beowulf: Return to the Shieldlands	Skellen	13 Part series
2017	My daughter is missing	Alek	TV movie
2018	Safe	Josh	7 episodes
2018	Butterfly	Stephen Duffy	3 episodes
2019	Krypton	Lobo	4 episodes
2019–2022	Peaky Blinders	Billy Grade	5 episodes
2019	Treadstone	Spencer	3 episodes
2020; 2025	Gangs of London	Jack O'Doherty	5 episodes
2020	The Deceived	Michael Callaghan	4 episodes
2021–2023	Kin	Jimmy Kinsella	Main Cast; 16 episodes
2021	The Tower	Inspector Kieran Shaw	Main Cast
2022	Ten Percent	Marcus MacLeod	3 episodes
2022	Derry Girls	Mad Stab	1 episode
2024	Fool Me Once	Shane Tessier	Main Cast
2024	The Teacher	Tim Oxley	4 episodes
2025–present	MobLand	Paul O'Donnell	Recurring role season 1; main cast season 2 (10 episodes)
2026	How to Get to Heaven from Belfast	Owen	8 episodes
2026	A Woman of Substance	Adam Fairley	8 episodes

== Awards and nominations ==
Year	Result	Award	Category	Film or series	Character
2011	Won	British Soap Awards	Villain of the Year	Hollyoaks	Brendan Brady
2011	Won	British Soap Awards	Best Newcomer	Hollyoaks	Brendan Brady
2011	Shortlisted*	British Soap Awards	Best Actor	Hollyoaks	Brendan Brady
2011	Nominated	British Soap Awards	Best Onscreen Partnership (with Kieron Richardson)	Hollyoaks	Brendan Brady (with Ste Hay)
2011	Shortlisted*	TV Choice Awards	Best Soap Actor	Hollyoaks	Brendan Brady
2011	Shortlisted*	TV Choice Awards	Best Soap Newcomer	Hollyoaks	Brendan Brady
2011	Won	Melbourne Underground Film Festival	Best Actor	Charlie Casanova	Charlie Barnum
2012	Shortlisted*	TV Choice Awards	Best Soap Actor	Hollyoaks	Brendan Brady
2012	Shortlisted*	British Soap Awards	Best Actor	Hollyoaks	Brendan Brady
2012	Won	Inside Soap Awards	Best Actor	Hollyoaks	Brendan Brady
2012	Won	Inside Soap Awards	Best Bad Boy	Hollyoaks	Brendan Brady
2012	Nominated*	National Television Awards	Outstanding Serial Drama Performance	Hollyoaks	Brendan Brady
2012	Nominated	Irish Film & Television Awards	Rising Star Award		
2013	Won	British Soap Awards	Best Onscreen Partnership (with Kieron Richardson)	Hollyoaks	Brendan Brady (with Ste Hay)
2013	Shortlisted*	British Soap Awards	Best Actor	Hollyoaks	Brendan Brady
2013	Shortlisted*	British Soap Awards	Villain of the Year	Hollyoaks	Brendan Brady
2013	Nominated	British Soap Awards	Best Exit	Hollyoaks	Brendan Brady
2013	Nominated	National Television Awards	Most Popular Serial Drama Performance	Hollyoaks	Brendan Brady
2013	Won	All About Soap Awards	Forbidden Romance (with Kieron Richardson)	Hollyoaks	Brendan Brady (with Ste Hay)

- (*) means there were two main rounds of nominations for that category. Shortlisted means he made it to the second and final round of voting.
