= Juliet Bressan =

Irish novelist and doctor

Juliet Bressan is an Irish novelist and doctor who began her writing career as a medical journalist and then became an author.

Her debut novel, Snow White Turtle Doves, is a love story set against the background of the anti-war movement and the 2003 Iraq war. Her second novel Entanglement was published in August 2009 and in August 2010 her third novel Dead Wicked was published. She co-wrote What Women Know which was released in September 2010.

Bressan acted in the TV-series The Clinic. In 2008 and 2009, in 17 episodes she played the role of health professional advisor.

In 2019 Bressan was appointed Managing Partner at Temple Bar Medical Center in Dublin.
