= Ailbhe Nic Giolla Bhrighde =

Irish screenwriter and author

Ailbhe Nic Giolla Bhrighde is an Irish screenwriter and author.

From County Donegal, Nic Giolla Bhrighde resides in County Galway. She completed a degree in Celtic Studies and an MA in Modern Irish at National University of Ireland, Galway. She was a scriptwriter on Ros na Rún and Seacht (TV series) with the likes of Anne Learmont, Sean de Gallaí and Edel Ní Dhrisceoi. Her books include Cáca don Rí and Cócó an Colgán Cairdiúil.
