= John Carney (director) =

Irish film director and screenwriter

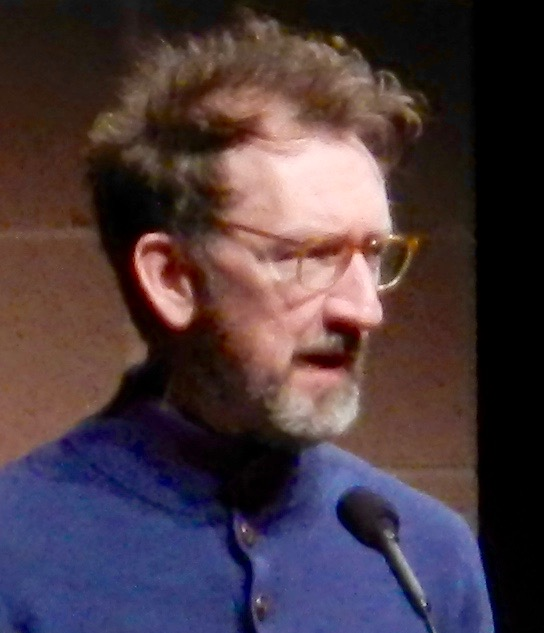
- Carney at the 2016 Sundance Film Festival
- Born: 1972 (age 53–54); Dublin, Ireland
- Occupations: Film director, film producer, screenwriter, composer, musician

John Carney (born 1972) is an Irish film director, producer, screenwriter, composer, and musician who specialises in musical films. He is best known as the showrunner and executive producer of Modern Love on Amazon Prime Video, for his films Once, Begin Again, and Sing Street. He is also a co-creator of the Irish TV drama series Bachelors Walk.

== Life and career ==
Carney was born in Dublin and was educated at De La Salle College Churchtown and at Synge Street CBS.

He was bassist for the Irish rock band The Frames between 1991 and 1993 and also directed some of their music videos.

In addition to shooting music videos, Carney also wrote and directed two award-winning short films (Shining Star and Hotel) before making his first feature. With fellow film-maker Tom Hall, Carney wrote and directed November Afternoon, his first feature film, in 1996. Despite a limited release, it was acclaimed as the "Film of the Year" by the Irish Times. The low-budget drama, shot in black and white, tells the story of two couples whose relationships begin to crumble over an eventful weekend. Carney himself provided a jazz score for the soundtrack.

After making a one-hour TV companion piece for the film entitled Just in Time, Carney's next film was the edgy drama Park, which premiered at the Dublin Film Festival. Written and co-directed by Carney and Tom Hall once again, the drama about a girl who is abused by a pedophile was released in 1999. It did not secure a wide release.

Two years later, in 2001, he co-wrote and directed On the Edge. The film starred Cillian Murphy and Stephen Rea and was released through Universal Studios. He was awarded the Silver Hitchcock Award for On the Edge at the 2001 Dinard Festival of British Cinema. The film, which was co-written by Daniel James, was released in the US with the title Catch the Sun.

Carney returned to TV writing and directing during the same year. He co-wrote and co-directed (with his brother Kieran Carney and Tom Hall) the successful RTÉ TV series Bachelors Walk. The independently produced TV series was successfully exported to a number of markets. The series ran for three seasons. He also directs The Modest Adventures of David O Doherty for RTÉ, starring Irish comedian O'Doherty and performed on the single "Orange", released by O'Doherty during the making of one of the series' episodes.

In 2003, he co-directed and co-wrote Zonad with Kieran Carney and Tom Hall. A story about an escaped convict who fools a whole Irish village into thinking he's a visitor from outer space, the film starred Simon Delaney and Cillian Murphy, Zonad was extremely low-budget and was never released.

In 2006, Carney directed the feature movie Once. A music drama, the movie stars The Frames frontman Glen Hansard and Czech musician Markéta Irglová. First released at the Galway Film Fleadh, Once had its official world release at the Sundance Film Festival in January 2007 and won the World Cinema Audience Award in the category Dramatic. A low-budget affair shot for only $160,000, Once was hugely successful, grossing $7 million worldwide in its first 3 months of release. Steven Spielberg is quoted as saying, "Once gave me enough inspiration to last the rest of the year." When told of this during an interview with Sky News, Carney replied, "In the end of the day, he's just a man with a beard." Carney was wearing a beard at the time. As writer and director of Once, Carney won the Most Promising Newcomer award in the Evening Standard British Film Awards 2007.

On the heels of Once's success, Carney was able to work on a full-fledged version of Zonad, which was released in March 2010.

In 2016, he wrote and directed the musical film Sing Street, which was released to critical acclaim.

Carney attracted criticism in 2016 when he referred to Keira Knightley in an interview with the UK's independent newspaper, stating "I'll never make a film with supermodels again." Knightley, who has amassed multiple accolades throughout her career, including Oscar, Golden Globe, BAFTA and SAG Award nominations, worked with Carney on the film Begin Again, alongside Mark Ruffalo and Adam Levine. While Carney praised Ruffalo as a "fantastic" actor and Levine for not being "a bit scared of exposing himself on camera," he said "Keira's thing is to hide who you are and I don't think you can be an actor and do that." "I don't want to rubbish Keira, but you know it's hard being a film actor and it requires a certain level of honesty and self-analysis that I don't think she's ready for yet and I certainly don't think she was ready for on that film," Carney said. The director later issued an apology, which included the following 'I'm ashamed of myself that I could say such things and I've been trying to account for what they say about me. In trying to pick holes in my own work, I ended up blaming someone else. That's not only bad directing, that's shoddy behaviour, that I am not in any way proud of. It's arrogant and disrespectful'.

Carney developed the 2019 romantic comedy anthology series Modern Love, also writing and directing several episodes.

In March 2022, it was announced that Carney would replace Kenneth Branagh as the director of an untitled Bee Gees biopic for Paramount Pictures. The film was removed from its scheduled date on the same day. However, in December it was announced that Lorene Scafaria would be replacing Carney as the project's director.

== Filmography ==
=== Film ===
Year	Title	Director	Writer	Producer	Composer	Notes
1996	November Afternoon	Yes	Yes	No	Yes	Co-directed with Tom Hall
1999	Park	Yes	Yes	No	Yes	Co-directed with Tom Hall
2001	On the Edge	Yes	Yes	No	Yes	
2007	Once	Yes	Yes	No	No	
2009	Zonad	Yes	Yes	No	No	Co-directed with Kieran Carney
2013	Begin Again	Yes	Yes	No	No	
2016	Sing Street	Yes	Yes	Yes	Yes	
2023	Flora and Son	Yes	Yes	Yes	Yes	
2026	Power Ballad	Yes	Yes	Yes	Yes	

=== Television ===
Year	Title	Director	Writer	Executive Producer	Creator	Notes
2001–2006	Bachelors Walk	Yes	Yes	No	Yes	Directed 18 episodes
2007	The Modest Adventures of David O'Doherty	Yes	No	No	No	6 episodes
2019–2021	Modern Love	Yes	Yes	Yes	Developer	Directed 7 episodes
2022	Modern Love Mumbai	No	No	Yes	No	
2022	Modern Love Hyderabad	No	No	Yes	No	
2022	Modern Love Amsterdam	No	No	Yes	No	
2024	Modern Marvels	Yes	No	No	No	Episode "Amazing Aluminum"

== Awards and nominations ==
Year	Award	Category	Title	Result
2007	Academy Awards	Best Original Song	Once	Won
2013	Academy Awards	Best Original Song	Begin Again	Nominated
2016	Golden Globes	Best Motion Picture – Musical or Comedy	Sing Street	Nominated
