= Seacht (TV series) =

- Created by: Orla King; Anne Learmont
- Countries of origin: Northern Ireland; Ireland
- Original language: Irish
- No. of series: 4
- No. of episodes: 34

Production
- Executive producer: Ferdia MacAnna
- Camera setup: Multi-Camera
- Running time: 25–26 minutes

Original release
- Network: TG4; BBC Northern Ireland
- Release: 7 January 2008 – 21 February 2011

Seacht (pronounced [ʃaxt̪ˠ]; Irish for "seven") is a college drama series following the lives of seven college students (Brian, Caroline, Pete, Joanne, Eithne, Linda, Decko, Paddy, and Marcas) at the Arts Department of Queen's University in Belfast.

The drama was broadcast on Irish language broadcaster TG4 and on BBC Two Northern Ireland. The show attracted an audience of around 40,000. It aired on Mondays 22:55 on TG4, repeated Saturdays at 22:05, and on BBC Two NI on Tuesdays at 22:00.

== Awards and critical acclaim ==
The first series of Seacht was nominated for IFTA and won the Young People category at the 2009 Celtic Media Festival Awards.

== Production ==
Seacht was a creation of Orla King and writer Anne Learmont.

The series was produced by Stirling Film & Television Productions Ltd., Tyrone Productions, and Eo Fis Teoranta and financed by IFB, Northern Ireland Screen, BCI and TG4.

The first series was shot on location in Queen's University, Belfast, in July and August 2007, the second series during the Summer of 2009.

- Writers: Anne Learmont, Louise Ní Fhiannachta, Gemma Breathnach, Colleen Ní Bhraonáin, Ailbhe Nic Giolla Bhrighde, Sean de Gallaí and Edel Ní Dhrisceoil
- Script development executive: Dearbhla Regan
- Storylines: Anne and Ailbhe Nic Giolla Bhrighde
- Director (1st series): Robert Quinn
- Producer: Ferdia MacAnna
- Photography: Tim Fleming
- Music: Ian Smyth

== Cast and characters ==
- Linda Bhreathnach (Eithne)
- Eoghan McDermott (DJ Pete)
- Neasa Ní Chuanaigh (Joanne)
- Aoife Nic Ardghail (Linda)
- Andrew Kavanagh (Decko)
- Alana Henderson (musician) (Caroline)
- Diarmaid Murtagh (Brian) (series 1)
- Cillian O' Donnachadha (Brian) (series 2–4)

Each of the seven lead roles were played by young actors who were selected following extensive nationwide auditions. For the second series three roles had to be cast (replacement for Diarmuid Murtagh as Brian, Paddy and Marcus).

Further cast:

- Charlotte Bradley
- Tom Ó Súilleabháin
- Bríd Ní Neachtain
- Brendan Murray
- Dairíne Ní Dhonnchú

== See also ==
- List of programmes broadcast by TG4
