= Blood of the Irish =

- Genre: Documentary
- Starring: Diarmuid Gavin
- Country of origin: Ireland
- Original language: English
- No. of series: 1
- No. of episodes: 2

Production
- Running time: 2 X 60 minutes

Original release
- Network: RTÉ One
- Release: 5 January – 12 January 2009

This is an article about a television documentary, not about the Irish Blood Transfusion Service. For the similarly titled song by Morrissey, see "Irish Blood, English Heart". The non-fiction book by Colm Tóibín is Bad Blood: A Walk Along the Irish Border.

Blood of the Irish is a two-part documentary miniseries broadcast on RTÉ One and presented by the professional gardener Diarmuid Gavin. It commenced airing on 5 January 2009 and completed broadcasting seven days later. Gavin sought 'the truth' about Irish genealogy.

The programme examined the previously claimed notion that one fifth of the modern male population living in the north-west counties are direct descendants of Niall of the Nine Hostages, the legendary high king who allegedly kidnapped the young Saint Patrick and led him to Ireland. This was found to be particularly the case in County Donegal where it was discovered that five inter-county footballers out of the entire panel of thirty carried the relevant gene. Daniel O'Donnell, an internationally renowned Irish singer and entertainer, submitted himself to for testing and it was discovered that he too was one of these descendants.

Gavin also explored a cave in Northern Spain while trying to link Ireland with migrants from the Basque region. He was surprised at similarities between Irish and people in Bermeo. He later extracted saliva samples containing DNA from people living in the West of Ireland and sent them for analysis. Bear DNA from old bones in an Irish cave was also found to be closely related to DNA from Spanish bears leading to the conclusion that the human immigrants must have carried the bears to Ireland in their skin-covered currach-type craft as domesticated animals. No other possibility was offered for this unusual finding.

Trinity College Dublin and EthnoAncestry undertook research. An attempt was made to extract ancient DNA from some of the oldest human remains found within the boundaries of Ireland. The Basques-to-Ireland theory was based on an earlier paper, "Y-chromosome variation and Irish origins" published in 2000, which examined 5 markers per sample. By 2009, further research in greater detail had suggested a much more complicated and layered origin for Irish male lineages, with private tests typically examining over 60 markers, which the programme makers ignored.

== Award ==
In 2010, Blood of the Irish won Best Documentary Series at the 7th Annual Irish Film and Television Awards (IFTA).
