= The Front Line (2006 film) =

- Directed by: David Gleeson
- Screenplay by: David Gleeson
- Produced by: Nathalie Lichtenthaeler
- Starring: Eriq Ebouaney; Gerard McSorley; James Frain; Fatou N'Diaye; Hakeem Kae-Kazim
- Cinematography: Volker Tittel
- Edited by: Stuart Gazzard
- Music by: Patrick Cassidy
- Production companies: Wide Eye Films; Philipp Homberg Filmproduktion; Sandrew Metronome Distribution Sverige AB; Picture Farm
- Distributed by: Buena Vista
- Release dates: July 16, 2006 (Ireland); February 12, 2006 (United States)
- Running time: 93 minutes
- Country: Ireland
- Language: English

The Front Line is a 2006 Irish crime drama film directed and written by David Gleeson.

== Plot ==
An African immigrant from the DR Congo working in a bank in Dublin city whose family is kidnapped by a gang of criminals who force him to be the inside man on their robbery of the bank.

== Cast ==
- Eriq Ebouaney as Joe Yumba
- Gerard McSorley as Detective Insp. Harbison
- James Frain as Eddie Gilroy
- Fatou N'Diaye as Kala
- Hakeem Kae-Kazim as Erasmus
- Brian Eli Ssebunya as Daniel
- Ian McElhinney as Mikey
- Orla O'Rourke as Detective Susan Clohessey
- Gavin O'Connor as Detective Duffy
- Garrett Lombard as Anton
- Maclean Burke as Plank
- Feidlim Cannon as Robbo
- Walter McMonagle as Mr. Sullivan
- David Herlihy as Mr. Burke
- Laura Jane Laughlin as Valerie
- Gina Costigan as Garda
