= The Tiger's Tail =

2006 film directed by John Boorman

- Theatrical release poster
- Directed by: John Boorman
- Written by: John Boorman
- Produced by: John Boorman; John Buchanan; Kieran Corrigan
- Starring: Brendan Gleeson; Kim Cattrall; Sinéad Cusack; Sean McGinley; Ciarán Hinds
- Cinematography: Seamus Deasy
- Edited by: Ron Davis
- Music by: Stephen McKeon
- Distributed by: Buena Vista International
- Release date: September 26, 2006 (San Sebastián)
- Running time: 107 minutes
- Countries: Ireland; United Kingdom
- Language: English

The Tiger's Tail is a 2006 Irish film written and directed by John Boorman and starring Brendan Gleeson and Kim Cattrall. The story focuses on the modern Celtic Tiger Irish economy of the late 20th century. The film premiered at the 2006 San Sebastián Film Festival.

== Plot ==
Liam O'Leary (Gleeson) is a successful real estate developer in Dublin. He lives in a magnificent house with his unhappy wife (Cattrall) and rebellious son. One day, his pleasant life takes a dramatic downturn. The city council turns down his request to build a stadium, toward which he has taken out cripplingly large bank loans, and a doppelgänger, with his identical body and facial features, begins appearing around town, ordering suits and automobiles on Liam's credit account and behaving in a scandalous manner. Liam desperately attempts to pull his life out of its tailspin, but he must return to his dirtpoor roots and the old friends he has long abandoned to find the answers.

== Characters ==
- Brendan Gleeson as Liam O'Leary
- Kim Cattrall as Jane O'Leary
- Ciarán Hinds as Father Andy
- Sinéad Cusack as Oona O'Leary
- Sean McGinley as Declan Murray
- Angeline Ball as Ursula
- Cathy Belton as Sally
