= Leigh Arnold =

Irish actress

- Born: Megan Leigh Arnold; Dublin, Ireland
- Occupation: Actress

Leigh Arnold (born Megan Leigh Arnold) was an Irish actress. A native of Foxrock, County Dublin, Arnold was known for her role of Dr Clodagh Delaney in the Irish TV series The Clinic.

== Early life ==
Arnold was a pupil of St Andrew's College in Dublin and took a degree in psychology and psychoanalysis at LSB College Dublin. In 2001, she was accepted to the American Academy of Dramatic Arts in New York.

== Career ==
=== Film and TV ===
Arnold landed the role of Dr Clodagh Delaney on the Irish TV series The Clinic, a multi award-winning drama for RTÉ. There were seven series from 2003 to 2009. She starred as Una in Terry McMahons Charlie Casanova in 2010, and played Catriona in TV3's Deception in 2012.

In 2010, she appeared on Celebrity Salon on TV3. After spending time raising her children, in 2023 Arnold went back to work by starring as Margaret in The Spin, directed by Michael Head.

=== Theatre ===
Arnold's theatre experience in Ireland includes Gerry Stenbridges' he Grown Up's, at the Peacock Theatre, Helen of Troy in Michael Scotts Trojan Women, The Vagina Monologues, My First Time and, in 2010, the role of Mina in Michael Scotts Dracula at the Tivoli Theatre.

== Philanthropy ==
Arnold combined her acting work with charity work and from 2009 to 2011 was an Ambassador for UNICEF Ireland. She was also a patron of FirstLight, a charity supporting families experiencing death of young children.

== Personal life ==
Arnold has had two sons with Steve Davies. Their wedding was postponed from 2013 to 2014 after Flynn's sudden infant death aged 2 weeks. Arnold went on become a patron of the First Light charity.

In 2015 she had a daughter. The family moved to Ibiza where Arnold had a second daughter, in 2019. Arnold and Davies divorced in 2022.

== Filmography ==
Film and television
| Year | Title | Role | Production company/TV station | Notes |
|---|---|---|---|---|
| 2003–2009 | The Clinic | Dr. Cloadagh Delaney | RTÉ | 7 series |
| 2010 | Charlie Casanova | Una | | |
| 2013 | Deception | Caitríona French | TV3 | |

| Year | Show | Role | TV Station | Episodes |
|---|---|---|---|---|
| 2010 | The Daily Show | Herself | RTÉ | 1 episode |
