= Mystics (film) =

- Directed by: David Blair
- Screenplay by: Wesley Burrowes; Mark O'Sullivan (story)
- Starring: Milo O'Shea; David Kelly; Maria Doyle Kennedy; Liam Cunningham; Stanley Townsend; Ronnie Drew
- Cinematography: Donal Gilligan
- Edited by: Mark Day; Sean Barton
- Music by: Stephen Warbeck
- Release date: 12 December 2003
- Running time: 90 minutes
- Countries: United Kingdom; Ireland
- Language: English

Mystics is a 2003 film starring Milo O'Shea and David Kelly, and directed by David Blair.
