= David Gleeson =

Irish film director and screenwriter

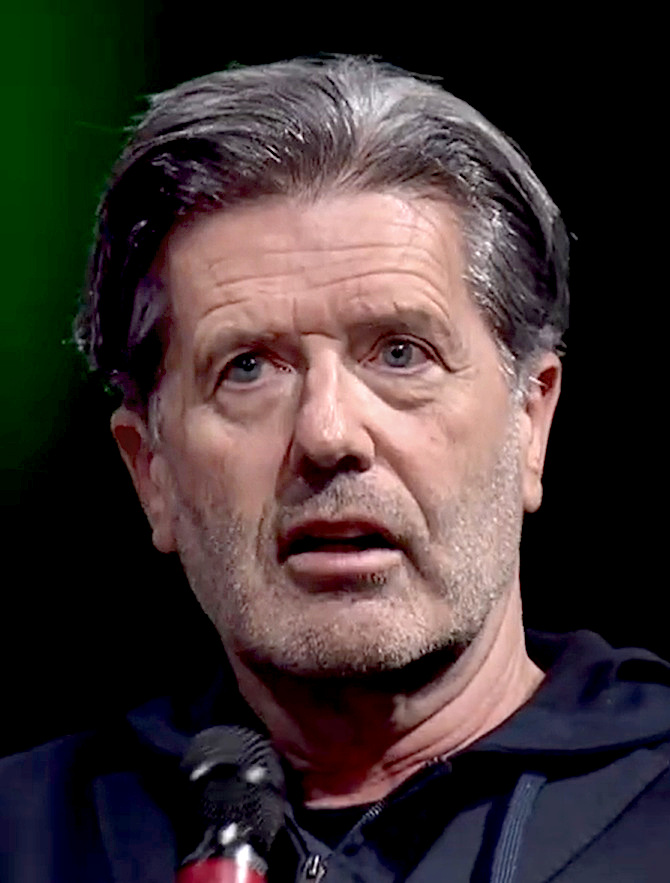
- Gleeson at DIFF 2026
- Born: Cappamore, Limerick, Ireland
- Occupations: Film director and writer

David Gleeson is an Irish film director and writer.

== Early life ==
A native of Cappamore, County Limerick, David Gleeson is the third generation of his family to enter the film business. His grandfather opened up the Regal Cinema, Cappamore, in the early 1940s, and his father, Eddie Gleeson, took over the business, opening up several more screens across the south west of Ireland, including the Curzon Cinema, Kilmallock, and the Ormond Cineplex, Nenagh, County Tipperary.

Gleeson began his career at the age of 19, writing and directing amateur theatre in the city of Limerick with the one-act drama Class Control.

A few years later he entered the North Sea oil industry, where he worked for five years, chiefly in the Forties Field on the Forties Charlie platform, followed by two years in the Arctic Circle off the coast of Norway on board the Ocean Alliance.

Gleeson met his producing partner and future wife, Nathalie Lichtenthaler, in New York City while attending a film course at the New York Film Academy, where she produced his first short film as a writer/director Feels Like Home.

== Career ==
Gleeson wrote and directed one other short film, Hunted, prior to writing and directing his feature debut, Cowboys & Angels.

Cowboys & Angels, a youth comedy/drama set in his native Limerick, was released in cinemas across Ireland by Buena Vista Int. The film won eight international film awards including Best Screenplay at Newport Beach (U.S.) and two Gold Medal Awards at Giffoni (Italy). The New York Times commented, [the film] 'offers a fresh mix of open-minded intelligence and a heartfelt point of view,' while the Chicago Tribune commented, 'Stack "Cowboys" against most of the fare American studios offer young adults and it's meatier by far'.

Gleeson's next film which he also wrote and directed, the crime dramaThe Front Line, was released in cinemas in 2006 also through Buena Vista Int. Variety called it; 'A satisfying blend of crime drama and geopolitical think piece about a Congolese refugee in Dublin, [The Front Line] sustains high levels of suspense while delivering an emotional wallop.' The Sunday Independent (Ireland) commented; 'Gleeson has delivered a terrific film that reminds us what big screens were made for, and it deserves to be a smash.'

In 2008, Gleeson signed with Creative Artists Agency and sold his time travel sci-fi spec screenplay 'The End of History' to Sony Pictures and Original Film. He followed this up with several more spec sales and commissions to studios including Focus Features, Fox Filmed Entertainment, Mattel Films and Paramount Pictures.

In July 2017, Gleeson began principal photography on his third film as writer and director, Don't Go, starring Stephen Dorff and Melissa George. The film is based on a screenplay by Ronan Blaney who shares a writing credit with Gleeson. Don't Go was released in the US through IFC Films on 28 October 2018.

In 2013, Fox Searchlight Pictures commissioned Gleeson to write Tolkien, based on his original pitch, about the English writer and author of The Hobbit and The Lord of the Rings, J. R. R. Tolkien. Fox Searchlight and Chernin Entertainment produced the biographical film, which stars Nicholas Hoult and was released in 2019.

In January 2019, Gleeson was commissioned by Disney+ to write The Grimm Legacy, the first in a potential franchise based on the book series by Polly Shulman.

== Filmography ==
=== Feature films ===
- Cowboys & Angels (2003)
- The Front Line (2006)
- Don't Go (2018)
- Tolkien (2019)
- Once Upon a Time in a Cinema (2026)
