= Stardust (miniseries) =

- Genre: True Story
- Starring: Ger Ryan, Allen Leech
- Country of origin: Ireland
- Original language: English
- No. of episodes: 2

Production
- Producer: Brackside Merlin Films
- Running time: 52 minutes

Original release
- Network: RTÉ One
- Release: 13 February – 14 February 2006

Stardust is a 2006 miniseries produced for RTÉ by Brackside Merlin Films. The first episode surrounds the night a fire broke out at the Stardust Disco in North Dublin on 14 February 1981, in which 48 people died. The second episode depicts the search for answers and justice by families and survivors. It was screened over two nights on the 25th anniversary of the incident in 2006. It was shortlisted for best miniseries at the 2006 Monte-Carlo Television Festival. The relatives of some victims were against its production.
