= Zonad =

- Theatrical release poster
- Directed by: John Carney; Kieran Carney
- Written by: John Carney; Kieran Carney
- Produced by: Ed Guiney; Andrew Lowe; John McDonnell
- Cinematography: Peter Robertson
- Edited by: Paul Mullen
- Music by: Brian Byrne
- Distributed by: Element Pictures
- Release dates: July 2009 (premiere); March 19, 2010 (general release)
- Running time: 75 minutes
- Country: Ireland
- Language: English

Zonad is an Irish comedy film by John and Kieran Carney that premiered in July 2009 at the Galway Film Fleadh. The film went to general release in Ireland March 19, 2010.

== Premise ==
An escaped convict fools a whole Irish village into thinking he's a visitor from outer space. Zonad, a strange visitor comes to the town of Ballymoran, is taken in by the Cassidy family and accepted by the locals as an extraterrestrial. His comfortable existence is spoiled when Bonad arrives to replace him.

== Unreleased short film version ==
In 2003, John Carney co-wrote and co-directed an earlier version of Zonad, a short film, with Kieran Carney and Tom Hall. Starring Simon Delaney and Cillian Murphy, Zonad was low-budget and was never released. Murphy played the role of Guy Hendrickson, later played by Rory Keenan.

== Cast ==
- Simon Delaney as Zonad, Liam Murphy.
- David Pearse as Bonad, Francis O'Connor. Bonad is Zonad's superior officer.
- Geoff Minogue as Dick Cassidy
- Donna Dent as Mary Cassidy
- Janice Byrne as Jenny Cassidy
- Kevin Maher as Jimmy Cassidy
- Rory Keenan as Guy Hendrickson
- David Murray as Benson, Guy Hendrickson's loyal manservant.
- Don Wycherley as a police sergeant

== Production ==
It was filmed in Avoca, County Wicklow, with many of the outdoor scenes filmed in the garden of Kilqueeny House in the village. The interior bar scenes were filmed in The Harbour Bar in Bray, County Wicklow, which was also used in Neil Jordan's Breakfast on Pluto.

== Reception ==
=== Critical response ===
The Irish Times wrote "We laughed like the proverbial drain". Variety writer John Anderson describe it as a "nutroll of a comedy" made from equal parts Pleasantville, The Quiet Man and the old Carry On films.

The Evening Herald wrote "Awful, and with a disturbingly sleazy undercurrent to boot".

=== Awards and recognition ===
Shortlisted for an Irish Film and Television Award (ITFA) with Brian Byrne winning for Best Original Score.
