= Don't Go (2018 film) =

Psychological thriller by David Gleeson

- Film poster
- Directed by: David Gleeson
- Written by: David Gleeson; Ronan Blaney
- Produced by: Nathalie Lichtenthaeler
- Starring: Stephen Dorff; Melissa George
- Cinematography: James Mather
- Edited by: Isobel Stephenson
- Music by: Ferry Corsten
- Release date: 2018
- Country: Ireland
- Language: English

Don't Go (also titled Don't Let Go) is a 2018 psychological thriller film from Irish writer/director David Gleeson, starring Stephen Dorff and Melissa George. The music was produced by Ferry Corsten.

== Following the tragic loss of Molly – their only child – Ben and Hazel Slater resolve to build a new life for themselves, renovating an idyllic hotel by the sea on Ireland's rugged west coast. But there is no escape, for the place is full of memories. ==
Haunted by the words 'Seas the day' which he sees everywhere and a recurring memory of a summer's day on the nearby beach when the family built sand castles topped with little red flags, Ben begins to realize that there are forces at work far beyond his understanding.

But what do those words mean? Could it be a childish misspelling of 'Seize the day'? Could this be a message from the other side? When Ben wakes from one of the dreams with a tiny red flag in his hand, he becomes convinced that just as he seized the flag, he can also seize his little girl from the dream. But nothing is ever so simple and when his wife's damaged best friend Serena arrives, Ben becomes terrified that the truth will be revealed ... The truth of how his daughter really died.

And as his grasp on reality begins to slip – as those around him begin to question his sanity – Ben becomes more determined than ever to solve this mystery and finally bring Molly home.

A determination which pays off as the pieces of the puzzle slot into place, giving Ben everything he ever wanted, but at a terrible price.

In his final dream, Ben realized what he had to do to bring Molly back. He finally remembered where he got his scar from. A boat named “Seas the Day” had hit him while he was swimming that day in the ocean, but he survived the accident. In an alternate universe version, he let himself get killed. That way, he would never have cheated on Hazel, Molly would not have walked into him and Serena and had the accident, and Serena would not have killed herself from guilt.

In the final scene, after Ben's funeral, Hazel is seen selling the house, and with the help of Serena, she and Molly are packing their things into the car. Her dog, however, ran back into the house and went upstairs. Hazel followed him into one of the rooms upstairs, where she found a tiny red flag on the windowsill.

== Cast ==
- Stephen Dorff as Ben Slater
- Melissa George as Hazel Slater
- Simon Delaney as Father Sean
- Aoibhinn McGinnity as Serena
- Grace Farrell as Molly
- Gavin O'Connor as Mr. Norton
- Lalor Roddy as Removal Man
- Des Cave as Uncle Frank
- Luke Griffin as Kieran
- Charlotte Bradley as Siobhan
- Sean Mahon as Dave Pearse
- Laurence O'Fuarain as Kevin Gunne

== Filming ==
The film began shooting in An Spidéal, the west of Ireland on July 10, 2017, and wrapped after 22 days on August 4, 2017.

== Release ==
Don't Go was acquired for theatrical distribution in the U.S. by IFC Films and opened in theaters on October 26, 2018. Don't Go opened in theaters across Ireland on April 12, 2019.

== Reception ==
The film received generally negative reviews. On Rotten Tomatoes, it has an approval rating of 39% based on reviews from 23 critics. The New York Times labelled the film a "middling thriller", but called Dorff's performance "Strikingly enigmatic." The Los Angeles Times found the film "dry and dour", saying, "This picture needs less moping and more spooking." Rex Reed panned the film, saying the script was "too slow for its own good."
