= Happy Ever Afters =

- Theatrical release poster
- Directed by: Stephen Burke
- Written by: Stephen Burke
- Produced by: Leslie McKimm
- Starring: Sally Hawkins; Tom Riley; Sinead Maguire; Jade Yourell; Ariyon Bakare
- Cinematography: Jonathan Kovel
- Production companies: Newgrange Pictures Ltd; Irish Film Board; Filmstiftung NRW; Films Distributions
- Distributed by: Buena Vista International
- Release dates: 10 October 2009 (Pusan); 25 December 2009 (Ireland)
- Running time: 101 minutes
- Country: Ireland
- Language: English
- Box office: €63,847

Happy Ever Afters is an Irish film written and directed by Stephen Burke and starring Sally Hawkins and Tom Riley. The film was first shown at the Pusan International Film Festival in South Korea on 10 October and released on 21 October 2009 in France. It tells the story of two weddings that collide when both receptions are held at one hotel.

Happy Ever Afters is produced by Newgrange Pictures Ltd, Irish Film Board, Filmstiftung NRW and Films Distributions and distributed in Ireland by Buena Vista International.

== Plot ==
Maura (Sally Hawkins) is a down on her luck single mother who's facing eviction from her house, which lead her to the rash decision to marry an illegal immigrant, Wilson, in exchange of €9,000. Maura's daughter Molly believes that her mother truly loves Wilson and that she's getting a new father. Meanwhile, Freddie (Tom Riley), a nice guy with OCD-esque habits, is remarrying the selfish and very image-conscious Sophie after a recent divorce. The receptions for both weddings are being held in the same hotel.

Freddie and Maura's paths keep crossing, leading to Sophie wrongly assuming that the two are involved in an illicit affair. To complicate matters, two immigration officers arrive at the wedding reception to investigate Wilson and Maura. Eventually Molly learns that her mother is involved in a scam and has no feelings for Wilson.

Believing her suspicions of an affair to be true, Sophie flees the wedding. Presuming Freddie responsible, Sophie's aggressive father loses his cool and attempts to assault Freddie. Meanwhile, Sophie has gone to a pub in Dublin with some working-class girls who support her decision to run away as they believe Freddie to be a lecherous cheater. Sophie gets drunk with her new friends while Freddie is frantically trying to find her to keep his marriage afloat.

It is revealed that one of the reasons for their original breakup wasn't Sophie's mental state, as insinuated, but Freddie's nervous breakdown for his inability to deal with Sophie. Facing ruin and a new divorce, Freddie tries to take his own life by throwing himself off the top floor of the hotel. However, just as he is about to jump, Maura steps in and talks him down from the ledge. When he returns to the wedding, they find both parties have joined and a drunken Sophie has come back.

Freddie and Sophie finally have an honest conversation, realise that their marriage is over and agree to part amicably. Freddie realises he has feelings for Maura, who has left the hotel with Wilson and Molly. Freddie chases after her. Maura believes that Freddie has reunited with Sophie, when he appears and convinces her otherwise. They unite and kiss. Maura then manages to convince the immigration officers that her marriage to Wilson is real. Wilson gives Maura the money he promised her and then leaves with his African girlfriend. In the end, Sophie's bully father is taken away in a straight jacket for trying to kill Freddie with an axe, and Freddie and Maura decide to take the honeymoon trip Freddie had planned for Sophie, with Molly in tow.

== Cast ==
- Sally Hawkins as Maura
- Tom Riley as Freddie
- Sinead Maguire - Molly
- Jade Yourell - Sophie
- Ariyon Bakare - Wilson
- Tina Kellegher - Karen
- Deirdre Molloy - Niamh
- Jill Murphy - Geraldine
- Simon Delaney - Dessie
- Michael McElhatton - Norman Ginty
- Peter Byrne - Repo Man

== Box office ==
This film grossed €63,847 as announced on 17 January 2010.
