= The Clinic (TV series) =

Irish television medical drama series

- Genre: Medical drama
- Created by: Orla Bleahen-Melvin; Lilie Ferrari
- Country of origin: Ireland
- Original language: English
- No. of series: 7
- No. of episodes: 66

Production
- Running time: 52 mins. approx.

Original release
- Network: RTÉ One
- Release: 12 October 2003 – 15 November 2009

The Clinic is an Irish primetime television medical drama series produced by Parallel Film Productions for RTÉ. It debuted on RTÉ One in 2003 to positive reviews and proved to be one of the network's most popular shows. The drama ran for seven seasons between September 2003 and November 2009. The last episode aired on RTÉ One on Sunday 15 November 2009 and on YLE1 in Finland on Wednesday 25 November 2009.

== Premise ==
The drama centred on the staff of the Clarence Street Clinic in the affluent Dublin 4 area of Dublin, Ireland. Clarence Street Clinic is a multi-disciplinary health centre which allows for an equally diverse cast. The last season, season 7 began airing on Irish television from on 27 September 2009.

== Story ==
The first two seasons consist of eight episodes; all subsequent seasons run for ten episodes.

=== Seasons 1 and 2 ===
In a Clinic where the healers often need healing more than the patients themselves. resident owners Cathy and Ed Costello try to patch up their troubled marriage while working side by side. Dan Woodhouse, the slick plastic surgeon with a shadowy past, struggles with his addictions to women and drugs. Physiotherapist Keelin Geraghty is tormented by her one-night stand with a married man. Long serving receptionist Fiona develops an obsession with her boss that seems to be leading her to ruination. Resident counsellor, Patrick, is struggling to stay off the booze as his interests in Cathy extend beyond the professional.

As tensions run high, can Cathy and Ed's marriage survive the pressures of running the Clinic? And will the professional and personal frailties of their staff endanger their happiness and their success?

=== Season 3 ===
Tensions between Cathy and Ed culminated at the end of series 2 when Cathy discovered Ed's infidelity with Physiotherapist Keelin. When Ed found out that Cathy was thinking of doing business with Plastic Surgeon, Dan Woodhouse behind his back, he decided their marriage was over and left.

Dan is delighted that Ed is now gone and the way is clear for him to move in on the Clinic. Cathy is heart broken but picks herself back up starting a burgeoning relationship with Dan. It takes a personal tragedy and a discovery that Dan is back to his old ways to make Cathy wake up and fight for control of the Clinic. Brendan decides to pursue his dreams of travelling leaving Clodagh who is shocked to discover her life is a lie. Richard the new GP finds it difficult to cope with his tragic personal life as Daisy's partying finally catches up with her. To top it all off the Clinic is put in peril when they discover that Alex isn't really who he said he was.

Cathy and Dan are at a standoff at the end of the series with Cathy hoping to push Dan out of the Clinic. Will Dan resort to anything to keep hold of his addiction, the Clinic, even if it means blackmailing Cathy?

=== Season 4 ===
Cathy and Dan are still at loggerheads at the start of series 4 waiting for Cathy's father, Paul O’Callaghan's will to be read. Cathy is convinced that her father's share of the Clinic will be left to her and with majority power she will finally be able to oust Dan. However, the late Paul O’Callaghan had other ideas and leaves his remaining share to his longtime lover, Julia Brady. Cathy and Julia are immediately pitted against each another as Cathy tries to come to terms with the legacy her father left behind. Julia's arrival also gives Dan a second lease of life – who was close to leaving the Clinic for good. With equal power however, Dan decides he's not going anywhere.

The Clinic also follows the lives and loves of a recently qualified GP and Acupuncturist, Clodagh Delaney, who is about to take up the new GP role, a Physiotherapist, Keelin Geraghty and a Counsellor, Patrick Murray. Our new Practice Nurse, Liam Smith, is introduced in episode 3. Other staff include Practice Manager, Aine Flanagan, as well as two receptionists Daisy O’Callaghan (Cathy's cousin) and the new addition to the front desk, Cara Madigan.

=== Season 5 ===
A new year brings further developments for the practitioners at Dublin's Clarence Street Clinic. Following a serious operation that left Dan fighting for his life, he returns with an opportunity for a fresh start. However, his circumstances become more complicated when he discovers that Cathy is pregnant.

It is a tumultuous start for the couple, but they eventually come together as one, looking forward to their future at the Clinic. However, their happiness is short-lived with the arrival of an old friend of Cathy and Ed’s, who has bought half the building right out from under them.

Dr. Lorcan O’Brien shakes up the Clinic by introducing a night methadone program that brings him into conflict with the other partners, especially Dan. But despite appearances, Lorcan is hiding a devastating secret of his own that threatens to bring him undone.

Keelin returns from New York as a married woman but struggles with finding a balance between her work and personal life while Cara causes tension at the front desk with her ambitious drive that threatens her relationship with Aine who is trying to juggle the demands of being a working mother.

Julia and Cathy are now monitoring Clodagh's every step after her potentially life-threatening diagnosis and this causes tension for Clodagh. However, the experience forces Clodagh to evaluate her priorities as a Doctor.

=== Season 6 ===
Daisy returns from her trip abroad with Conor to be by her stricken cousin's side and to provide some comfort to Dan, who has been keeping a constant vigil by Cathy's bedside since the accident, willing her to live. New receptionist Ruairi is introduced to us as he balances working in the Clinic with his other life as a DJ in a trendy Dublin nightclub, while Practice Manager Cara bumps up her status by overseeing the building of her new office.

Liam's son Ian is in trouble yet again. This time he's caught joyriding in his friend's car and is asked to leave his school after too many warnings of bad behaviour. Liam is beside himself and now must somehow find the money to send Ian to a private school, putting a severe financial strain on the family.

Lorcan and Clodagh continue to enjoy their growing closeness as they work together to keep the Clinic afloat in the absence of two of their doctors. Everyone is under immense pressure as a result of this staff shortage, and Julia eventually agrees with Lorcan and Cara to bring in a locum to help relieve the workload.

=== Season 7 ===
In the seventh and last season of the Clinic it introduced new characters and which were played by some of Ireland's leading female actors this included Victoria Smurfit who played the role of a new doctor and a new love interest for Dan. Alison Doody also joined the cast, playing a middle-class woman with a seedy past.

In episode 1, Dan is released by the Gardaí after questioning for the suspected murder of Niall Boylan but returns to the Clinic only to find Daisy still angry that he ripped off the Clinic by supplying cosmetic surgery supplies at inflated price. Dan secures Lorcan's (Mark Dymond) backing against Daisy by reminding him of the trump card he now holds – Lorcan's secret HIV status. But Dan is not out of the woods yet – Boylan's brother is convinced of the doctor's guilt and is determined to make him suffer. Daisy is left smarting by Lorcan's inexplicable backing of Dan and questions his decision to allow Dave McGinn (Thomas Farrell) back into the Clinic despite the stabbing of his partner Annie Ward (Suzy Lawlor).

Meanwhile, Lorcan's daughter Madison (Sophie Jo Wasson) has come to live with him, and when Clodagh (Leigh Arnold) also agrees to move in, Lorcan feels a new family coalescing around him.

Towards the end of the season Lorcan's HIV positive status became public knowledge, initially staff at the Clinic believed that Dan exposed the truth. During this time Lorcan disappears and Clodagh tries to explain his disappearance to his daughter Madison. Meanwhile, Edel, Cara and Ruairi support Daisy and Dan is under pressure from Diarmaid and Lucille. Dan becomes involved with a Lucille played by Alison Doody and loses a game of cards that he plays with her. Dan losses his share in the clinic as Alison Doody' character bet him for his share of the Clinic during the game of cards. It later becomes exposed that Lucille and her husband are involved in human trafficking and the drug trade in Dublin.

By the end of the season Dan begins to pack up as he finishing up in Clarence Street. But he hasn't seen the back of Lucille (Alison Doody) and Diarmuid just yet. A scene of drama unfolds where Lucille becomes injured and is rushed to the Clinic by Diarmuid. Diarmuid holds the staff of the Clinic hostage. Ruairi becomes injured and the counsellor has a heart-attack. The season ends with great uncertainty about key characters including will Dan return to the Clinic and will Ruairi survive his injury. The season ends abruptly resulting in a cliffhanger. It was expected that the show would return for the Autumn/Winter Season in 2010, but it was later confirmed by RTÉ that the show has now been cancelled.

== Cast and characters ==
Actor	Character	Season(s)
Dominic Mafham	Mr. Dan Woodhouse	all
Gary Lydon	Mr. Patrick Murray	all
Amy Huberman	Daisy O'Callaghan	all
Colin O'Donoghue	Conor Elliott	4–6
Gertrude Montgomery	Aine Flanagan	1–5
Lorraine Pilkington	Sussie Cassidy	1
Rachel Pilkington	Keelin Geraghty	all
Geraldine Plunkett	Mrs. Fleming	1–3
Gemma Craven	Dr. Julia Brady	4–6
Leigh Arnold	Dr. Clodagh Delaney	2–7
Aidan Turner	Ruairí McGowan	6 & 7
Tanya Moodie	Dr. Grace Sefate	6 & 7
Mark Dymond	Lorcan O'Brien	5–7
Victoria Smurfit	Dr. Edel Swift	7
Aisling O'Sullivan	Dr. Cathy Costello	1–6
David Wilmot	Dr. Ed Costello	1 & 2
Tomas O'Suilleabhain	Detective Ronan Donaghue	2–6
Dawn Bradfield	Cara Madigan	4–7
Sam Corry	Alex Walsh	1–3
Sophie Jo Wasson	Madison	7
Chris O'Dowd	Brendan Davenport	1–3
David Herlihy	Nurse Liam Smith	4–6
Norma Shehan	Fiona McColgan	1–4, 6
Tommy Fitzgerald	Fergus Mitchell	6 & 7
Panashe Mc Guckin	Guycell	1 Episode, Season 7
Emmett Scanlan	Jimmy Rice	6 & 7
Sabina Brennan	Nervy woman	1
Catherine Walker	Alice O'Brien	5–7
Simon O'Gorman	Billy Flanagan	1, 3–5
Orla O'Rourke	Sinéad Kelly	2–4
Juliet Bressan	Health professional advisor	6 & 7
June Rodgers	Nurse	7

== Cancellation ==
On 23 November 2009 it was reported amongst some media outlets that RTÉ had axed The Clinic. This was later confirmed by RTÉ Television on 24 November 2009. Media reports speculated that the cancellation was due to the high costs producing the series. Such claims were later denied by RTÉ, instead blame was placed on low viewing figures. It was claimed that the show lost 70,000 viewers in the Season 7, though the show still received over 400,000 viewers per episode and rated in the top 10 most watched shows on RTÉ One.

Season 7 ended with a cliffhanger, leaving many plot-lines open and the opportunity for further development of key characters. This left some viewers to speculate as to what future direction the show would take as it ended abruptly. RTÉ's then Director of Programmes, Steve Carson, stated that RTÉ were committed to producing further Irish dramas, and that a new show was in development to air in the same timeslot as The Clinic from September 2010. In 2010 the series was replaced by Raw which originally started on RTÉ Two.

== International broadcast ==
The show also airs on a number of television channels in other countries:

Country	Date of premiere	Channel
Finland	2003	YLE 1
Iceland	2003	RUV
Hungary	2010	M2
Serbia	2010	TV Košava
New Zealand	2010	TVNZ 6
Australia	2010	ABC1
United States	2015	Acorn TV

== DVD release ==
The complete series (seasons 1–7) of The Clinic was released on DVD in November 2010 by RTÉ.

== Reception ==
=== Ratings ===
Season	Season premiere	Season finale	TV Season	Viewer Rank (#)	Viewers (in '000)
Season 1	October 2003	December 2003	2003–2004	#18	339
Season 2	October 2004	5 December 2004	2004–2005	#14	402
Season 3	October 2005	November 2005	2005–2006	#11	450
Season 4	October 2006	3 December 2006	2006–2007	#4	500
Season 5	30 September 2007	2 December 2007	2007–2008	#4	500
Season 6	October 2008	November 2008	2008–2009	#4	497
Season 7	October 2009	November 2009	2009–2010	#7	405

=== Awards and nominations ===
==== Wins ====
- IFTA Awards 2007 – Best Drama Series
- IFTA Awards 2007 – Best Actor in a Supporting Role in TV – Gary Lydon
- IFTA Awards 2008 – Best Actress – Aisling O'Sullivan
- IFTA Awards 2010 – Best Drama Series

==== Nominations ====
- IFTA Awards 2008 – Actress in a Supporting Role Television – Amy Huberman
- IFTA Awards 2008 – Actor in a Supporting Role Television – Gary Lydon
- IFTA Awards 2009 – Actor in a Leading Role Television – Dominic Mafham
- IFTA Awards 2009 – Best Drama Series
- IFTA Awards 2010 – Best Drama Series
- IFTA Awards 2010 – Actress in a Supporting Role Television – Amy Huberman
