= Michael McElhatton =

Irish actor and writer

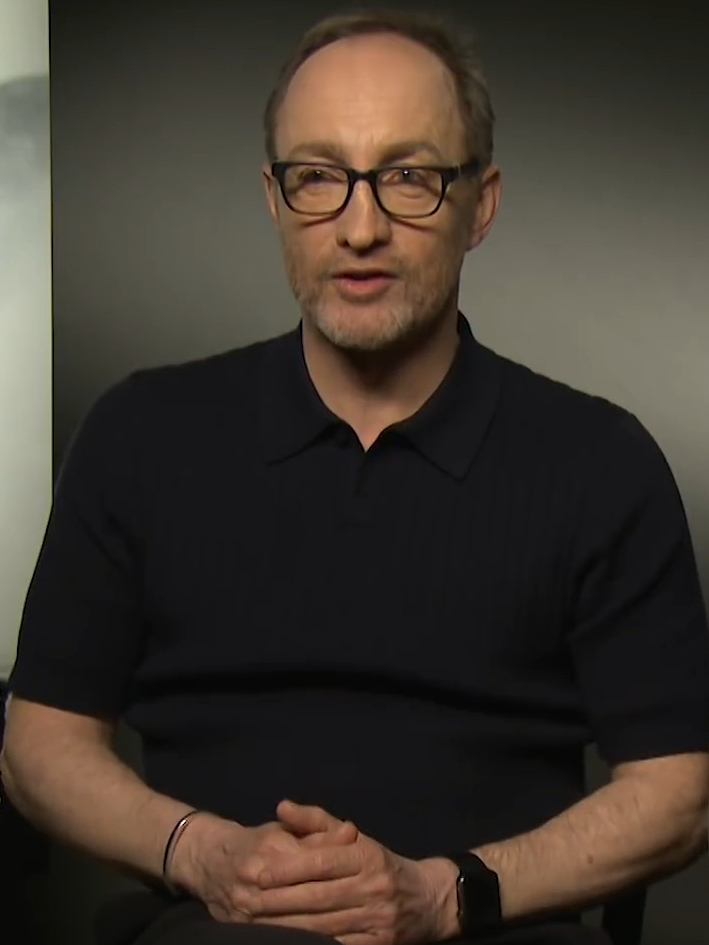
- McElhatton in 2018
- Born: 12 September 1963 (age 62); Dublin, Ireland
- Education: Royal Academy of Dramatic Art
- Occupations: Actor, writer
- Years active: 1987–present
- Children: 1

Michael McElhatton (born 12 September 1963) is an Irish actor and writer. He is best known for playing the role of Roose Bolton in the HBO series Game of Thrones from the second to the sixth season (2012–2016). Other credits include I Went Down (1997), Paths to Freedom (2000), Saltwater (2000), Blow Dry (2001), The Actors (2003), Spin the Bottle (2003), Perrier's Bounty (2009), Albert Nobbs (2011), Death of a Superhero (2011), Pentecost (2012), The Fall (2013), The Hallow (2015), The Zookeeper's Wife (2017), Chernobyl (2019), Das Boot (2020), The Alienist: Angel of Darkness (2020), The Wheel of Time (2021), Jack Ryan (2022) and The Long Shadow (2023).

== Early life ==
McElhatton was born on 12 September 1963 in Terenure, a suburb in the south of Dublin. He began studying acting at Terenure College, and afterward spent eight years in London where he graduated from the Royal Academy of Dramatic Art in 1987. McElhatton returned to Ireland in the early nineties, where he began his acting career mainly in theatre and television.

== Career ==
He appeared in a short film titled The Loser in 1990. In 1996, he was directed by John Carney in the film November Afternoon, in which he plays the main character. In the late nineties and early 2000s, McElhatton appeared in I Went Down (1997), Saltwater (2000), Blow Dry (2001), and The Actors (2003). Between 2000 and 2002, McElhatton gained fame from appearing in the situation comedies Paths to Freedom and Fergus's Wedding. In addition to acting, he also took on the role of screenwriter, writing the screenplay for all of the episodes. The character of Rats in Paths to Freedom (2000), which he wrote and starred in, became popular with the public and allowed it to be adapted into an entire feature film Spin the Bottle (2003). As his career went on, McElhatton continued playing minor characters in films by directors such as Lenny Abrahamson, John Boorman, and Kari Skogland. McElhatton also appeared in Perrier's Bounty (2009), and Death of a Superhero (2011).

He returned to his role as writer in 2010, writing six episodes of the sitcom Your Bad Self. Over the next decade, McElhatton began appearing in much larger roles. In 2011, he had a role in the film Albert Nobbs , directed by Rodrigo García, and Death of a Superhero (2011). The following year the short Pentecost, which received a nomination for Best Short Film at the 2012 Academy Awards. That same year he took part in the James Marsh directed film Shadow Dancer.

In 2012, McElhatton joined the cast of the HBO television series Game of Thrones, beginning in the second season, playing the character of warlord Roose Bolton. From the fifth season on he was promoted to series regular.

In 2013, he appeared in The Fall, alongside Gillian Anderson and Jamie Dornan. In 2015, he played one of the protagonists in the horror film The Hallow, which was presented at the 2015 Sundance Film Festival. He appeared in the screen adaptation of the true story of World War II drama The Zookeeper's Wife in 2017.

In 2019, he starred as Andrei Stepashin in Chernobyl (2019). In 2020, he was Deputy Inspector Thomas O'Leary in Das Boot (2020), and starred in the series The Alienist: Angel of Darkness (2020).

In 2021, McElhatton appeared as Tam al'Thor in the adaptation of The Wheel of Time (2021) on Amazon Prime Video. His casting was announced on 6 November 2019 through Twitter.

In 2025, he played the butler's role of John Potter in the Netflix series House of Guinness based on the Dublin brewing family.

== Filmography ==
=== Film ===
Year	Title	Role	Director	Notes
1990	The Loser	Eddie	Keith Boak	Short film
1996	November Afternoon	John	John Carney, Tom Hall	
1997	Ballyseedy	Comdt. Ed. Breslin	Frank Hand	Television film
1997	I Went Down	Johnner Doyle	Paddy Breathnach	
1997	All Souls' Day		Alan Gilsenan	
1998	To the Mountain		Jean Pasley	Short film
1998	Crush Proof	Detective Sergeant Hogan	Paul Tickell	
1999	Between Dreams	Mr. Fitzsimons	Ian Fitzgibbon	Short film
1999	Vicious Circle	Garrett	David Blair	Television film
1999	Underworld	Jimmy	Ronan Gallagher	Short film
2000	Saltwater	John Traynor	Conor McPherson	
2001	Blow Dry	Robert	Paddy Breathnach	
2001	Zulu 9	Garda Dispatcher	Alan Gilsenan	Short film
2002	Ape	Dandy Dance	Rory Bresnihan	Short film, voice only
2003	The Actors	Jock	Conor McPherson	
2003	Intermission	Sam	John Crowley	
2003	Spin the Bottle	Rats	Ian Fitzgibbon	
2004	Waterloo Dentures	Captain	Rachael Moriarty, Peter Murphy	Short film
2004	Mickybo and Me	Mechanic	Terry Loane	
2004	Adam & Paul	Martin	Lenny Abrahamson	Voice only
2004	God's Early Work	God	Rory Bresnihan	Short film, voice only
2005	George		Rory Bresnihan, John Butler	Short film
2005	English		Rory Bresnihan	Short film
2006	The Tiger's Tail	Dr. Alex Loden	John Boorman	
2007	The Martyr's Crown	Officer	Rory Bresnihan	Short film
2007	My Boy Jack	Leo Amery MP	Brian Kirk	Television film
2008	Spacemen Three	Dr. Yuri Semyonov	Hugh O'Conor	Short film
2008	Fifty Dead Men Walking	Robbie	Kari Skogland	
2008	The Man Inside	Locksmith	Rory Bresnihan	Short film
2009	Perrier's Bounty	Ivan	Ian Fitzgibbon	
2009	Happy Ever Afters	Detective Norman Ginty	Stephen Burke	
2010	Parked	Frank	Darragh Byrne	
2010	The Santa Incident	Ross	Yelena Lansyaka	Television film
2011	Pentecost	Pat Lynch	Peter McDonald	Short film
2011	Albert Nobbs	Mr. Moore	Rodrigo García	
2011	Death of a Superhero	James Clarke	Ian Fitzgibbon	
2012	Shadow Dancer	Liam Hughes	James Marsh	
2013	The Food Guide to Love	Famine narrator	Dominic Harari, Teresa Pelegri	Voice only
2014	The Legend of Longwood	The Black Knight	Lisa Mulcahy	Voice only
2015	The Hallow	Colm Donnelly	Corin Hardy	
2016	Norm of the North	Laurence	Trevor Wall	Voice only
2016	Mammal	Matt	Rebecca Daly	
2016	The Autopsy of Jane Doe	Sheriff Sheldon	André Øvredal	
2016	Handsome Devil	Walter Curly	John Butler	
2016	The Siege of Jadotville	McEntee	Richie Smyth	
2017	The Zookeeper's Wife	Jerzyk	Niki Caro	
2017	King Arthur: Legend of the Sword	Jack's Eye	Guy Ritchie	
2017	The Foreigner	Jim Kavanagh	Martin Campbell	
2017	Justice League	Terrorist Leader	Zack Snyder, Joss Whedon	
2018	Agatha and the Truth of Murder	Sir Arthur Conan Doyle	Terry Loane	Television film
2019	The Last Right	Frank Delaney	Aoife Crehan	
2019	Arracht	Lieutenant	Tomás Ó Súilleabháin	Irish language
2019	Togo	Jafet Lindeberg	Ericson Core	
2020	The Winter Lake	Ward	Phil Sheerin	
2021	Zack Snyder's Justice League	Black Clad Alpha	Zack Snyder	Director's cut of Justice League
2021	The Last Duel	Bernard Latour	Ridley Scott	
TBA	White	Magus Magnusson	Steven Waddington	In production

=== Television ===
Year	Title	Role	Notes	Ref.
1999	The Ambassador	Commander 2	Episode: "Vacant Possession"	
2000	Paths to Freedom	Raymond 'Rats' Doyle	6 episodes	
2001	Rebel Heart	Cathal Brugha	Mini-series; 3 episodes	
2002	Fergus's Wedding	Fergus Walsh	4 episodes	
2006	Hide & Seek	Paul Holden	4 episodes	
2010	Your Bad Self		6 episodes	
2011	Zen	Ernesto Heuber	Mini-series; Episode: "Ratking"	
2012–2016	Game of Thrones	Roose Bolton	19 episodes	
2013	The Fall	Rob Breedlove	4 episodes	
2013	Ripper Street	Commissioner James Monro	2 episodes	
2013	The Ice Cream Girls	Brian	Mini-series; 3 episodes	
2014	New Worlds	John Hawkins	3 episodes	
2015	Strike Back: Legacy	Oppenheimer	2 episodes	
2016	Mammon	Melanie Holly, CIA Agent	2 episodes	
2017–2018	Genius	Dr. Philipp Lenard / Jonas Salk	4 episodes	
2019	The Rook	Lorik	4 episodes	
2019	Chernobyl	Andrei Stepashin	Episode: "Vichnaya Pamyat"	
2019	Ant & Dec's DNA Journey	Voiceover	Television documentary	
2020	Das Boot	Deputy Inspector Thomas O'Leary	4 episodes	
2020	The Alienist: Angel of Darkness	Dr. Markoe	6 episodes	
2021	The Wheel of Time	Tam al'Thor		
2023	Jack Ryan	Bill Tuttle	6 episodes	
2023	The Long Shadow	Chief Constable Ronald Gregory		
2025	House of Guinness	John Potter		

=== Video games ===
Year	Title	Voice role	Ref.
2013	Assassin's Creed IV: Black Flag	Vance Travers	
2019	Final Fantasy XIV: Stormblood	Gaius Baelsar	
2019	Final Fantasy XIV: Shadowbringers	Gaius Baelsar	

== Writing credits ==
- Paths to Freedom
- Fergus's Wedding
- Spin the Bottle
- Your Bad Self

== Selected stage career ==
- The Night Alive, as Doc, Donmar Warehouse, London, and the Atlantic Theater, New York City
- The Seafarer, as Nicky Giblin, National Theatre, London
- Shining City, Royal Court Theatre, London
- The Wexford Trilogy, Tricycle Theatre
- An Ideal Husband, Gate Theatre
- The White Devil, Project at The Mint
- Car Show, Corn Exchange
- Twenty Grand, Abbey Theatre
- Greatest Hits, Project Arts Centre
- The Way of the World, Project Arts Centre
- A Decision Pure and Simple, Riverside Studios
- An Enemy of the People, for Young Vic
- As You Like It, Rose Theatre
- Midnight Court, Project Theatre
- Wind in the Willows, Sheffield Crucible
- Little Malcolm and His Struggle Against the Eunuchs, BAC
- Water Music, Cockpit Theatre

== Awards and nominations ==
- 2003 IFTA Award nomination, Best Actor – Film for "Spin the Bottle"
- 2003 IFTA Award nomination, Best Script for "Spin the Bottle" – Ian Fitzgibbon/Michael McElhatton/Grand Pictures
- 2007 IFTA Award nomination, Best Actor – Television for "Hide & Seek"
- 2013 IFTA Award nomination, Best Supporting Actor – Film for "Death of a Superhero"
- 20th Screen Actors Guild Awards nomination, Outstanding Performance by an Ensemble in a Drama Series
