= Papi Chulo (film) =

2019 film by John Butler

- Theatrical release poster
- Directed by: John Butler
- Written by: John Butler
- Produced by: Rebecca O'Flanagan; Robert Walpole
- Starring: Matt Bomer; Alejandro Patiño; Elena Campbell-Martinez; Wendi McLendon-Covey; Tommie Earl Jenkins; Shaughn Buchholz
- Cinematography: Cathal Watters
- Edited by: John O'Connor
- Music by: John McPhillips
- Production companies: Treasure Entertainment; Perfect World Pictures; Light Switch Productions; Fortification Media
- Distributed by: Blue Fox Entertainment (United States); Eclipse Pictures (Ireland)
- Release dates: September 8, 2018 (TIFF); June 7, 2019 (United States and Ireland)
- Running time: 99 minutes
- Countries: United States; Ireland
- Language: English

Papi Chulo is a 2018 comedy-drama film written and directed by John Butler, starring Matt Bomer and Alejandro Patiño. It premiered at the 2018 Toronto International Film Festival.

== Plot ==
Sean, a solitary and alienated television weatherman, drives past a middle-aged Hispanic migrant worker standing outside a hardware store looking for work. He decides to hire this kind-looking man, to paint his deck and for someone to talk to, in this darkly comedic reflection on class, ethnicity, and companionship in contemporary Los Angeles. Sean is young, gay and white; Ernesto, portly, straight and married. Despite having nothing in common and a language barrier, they build a sort of friendship, until Sean becomes consumed with a deeper obsessive need.

== Cast ==
- Matt Bomer as Sean
- Alejandro Patiño as Ernesto
- Elena Campbell-Martinez as Linda
- Wendi McLendon-Covey as Ash
- Michael Shepperd as Stan
- Tommie Earl Jenkins as Tom
- Edgar Arreola as Elisio
- Ryan Guzman as Rodrigo
- Shaughn Buchholz as Mike
- D'Arcy Carden as Susan

== Release ==
Papi Chulo had its world premiere at the Toronto International Film Festival on September 8, 2018. The film also screened at BFI London Film Festival; the Torino Film Festival on November 23, 2018; the Palm Springs International Film Festival on January 6, 2019; and the Dublin International Film Festival on February 20, 2019. It then released in select theaters on June 7, 2019.

== Reception ==
=== Critical response ===
Review aggregation website Rotten Tomatoes gives the film a 75% rating, based on 51 reviews, with an average rating of 6.5/10. The site's consensus reads: "Papi Chulo is a cross-cultural comedy that mostly avoids the pitfalls of its premise, largely thanks to the chemistry between its well-matched leads." Another aggregator, Metacritic, gave the film a score of 42 out of 100, based on 11 critics, indicating "mixed or average reviews".

=== Accolades ===
Award	Year of ceremony	Category	Recipient(s)	Result	Ref.
Guadalajara International Film Festival	2019	Best Feature Film	John Butler	Nominated	
Newport Beach Film Festival	2019	Feature Film	Papi Chulo	Won	
Toronto International Film Festival	2018	Grolsch People's Choice Award	Papi Chulo	Nominated	
