= Medusa (The X-Files) =

- The X-Files episode
- Officer Philbrick's body, after being exposed to the medusas.
- Episode no.: Season 8 Episode 12
- Directed by: Richard Compton
- Written by: Frank Spotnitz
- Production code: 8ABX13
- Original air date: February 11, 2001
- Running time: 44 minutes

Guest appearances
- Ken Jenkins as Deputy Chief Karras; Penny Johnson as Dr. Hellura Lyle; Adam Lieberman as Officer Philbrick; Vyto Ruginis as Lt. Bianco; Judith Scott as Dr. Kai Bowe; Brent Sexton as Steven Melnick; Bill Jacobson as Thug; Mary Kathleen Gordon as Woman; Christopher Graves as Kid; Kevin Graves as Kid

Episode chronology
← Previous "The Gift"	Next → "Per Manum"
- The X-Files season 8

"Medusa" is the twelfth episode of the eighth season of the American science fiction television series The X-Files. It premiered on the Fox network on February 11, 2001. The episode was written by Frank Spotnitz and directed by Richard Compton. "Medusa" is a "Monster-of-the-Week" story, unconnected to the series' wider mythology. The episode received a Nielsen rating of 8.2 and was viewed by 13.8 million viewers. Overall, the episode received mixed reviews from critics.

The series centers on FBI special agents Dana Scully (Gillian Anderson) and her new partner John Doggett (Robert Patrick)—following the alien abduction of her former partner, Fox Mulder (David Duchovny)—who work on cases linked to the paranormal, called X-Files. In this episode, a string of bizarre deaths in the tunnels of the Boston subway system sees Doggett join a team of professionals underground to investigate. Meanwhile, Scully has to defy the train authorities above ground, who are determined to get the trains up and running within hours.

"Medusa" was allotted a "huge budget", due mostly to the fact that a replica of the Boston subway had to be recreated. Robert Patrick later called the eventual set "the biggest damned thing I'd seen in my life." Cheri Montesanto-Medcalf and Matthew Mungle, the show's make-up effect producers, used several unorthodox ingredients to create the effect of melted flesh; in addition to the use of normal prosthetic make-up, the two also used a combination of figs and Fruit Roll-Ups.

== Plot ==
In Boston, an undercover cop, Officer Philbirck, follows a suspected robber onto a subway. The train suddenly loses power, and when the lights flicker back on, Philbirck is found dead with much of his flesh stripped to the bone. In the aftermath, Agents Dana Scully (Gillian Anderson) and John Doggett (Robert Patrick) are called into investigate, but Deputy Chief Karras and Lieutenant Bianco of the transit police pressure them to finish quickly so the system can reopen in time for rush hour.

When neither autopsy results or CDC tests can identify the biological or chemical agent that caused Philbirck's death, Doggett and Bianco decide to enter the tunnels with a team that also includes structural engineer Steven Melnick and CDC specialist Dr. Hellura Lyle. Scully, meanwhile, is tasked with monitoring the group from the surface. During the investigation, Melnick suffers a mysterious burn. Though the group suspects the burn was caused by chemicals, nearby water proves to be harmless salt water.

The team eventually discovers the robber Philbirck had been pursuing, his flesh eaten away like the officer's, along with three similarly disfigured bodies wrapped in plastic. Doggett and the group begin to suspect that someone has been covering up the problem in the subway. Near where the train lost power, electrical flashes begin destroying the skin on Melnick's arm. Lyle takes Melnick to the surface while Doggett continues with Bianco. Meanwhile, Scully discovers that Karras is attempting to remove the bodies through a non-CDC hazmat crew and accuses him of a cover-up. Later, Karras reopens the subway despite the danger.

Back in the tunnels, Doggett notices a green glow on Bianco and prevents him from leaving. Meanwhile, on the surface, marine biologist Dr. Kai Bowe identifies the water samples as containing microscopic, bioluminescent medusas made of calcium. When Doggett and the worsening Bianco encounter an unaffected boy, Scully realizes that when the medusas interact with sweat, an electrical reaction occurs because sweat conducts calcium ions. However, because the boy's sweat glands have not fully developed, he has not been affected. Following the boy, Doggett finds a major leak from the harbor, with the green glow covering the walls. Realizing that the glow indicates the presence of the medusas, Doggett uses Bianco's gun as an electrical conductor between the third rail and the water, which kills the creatures for good.

== Production ==
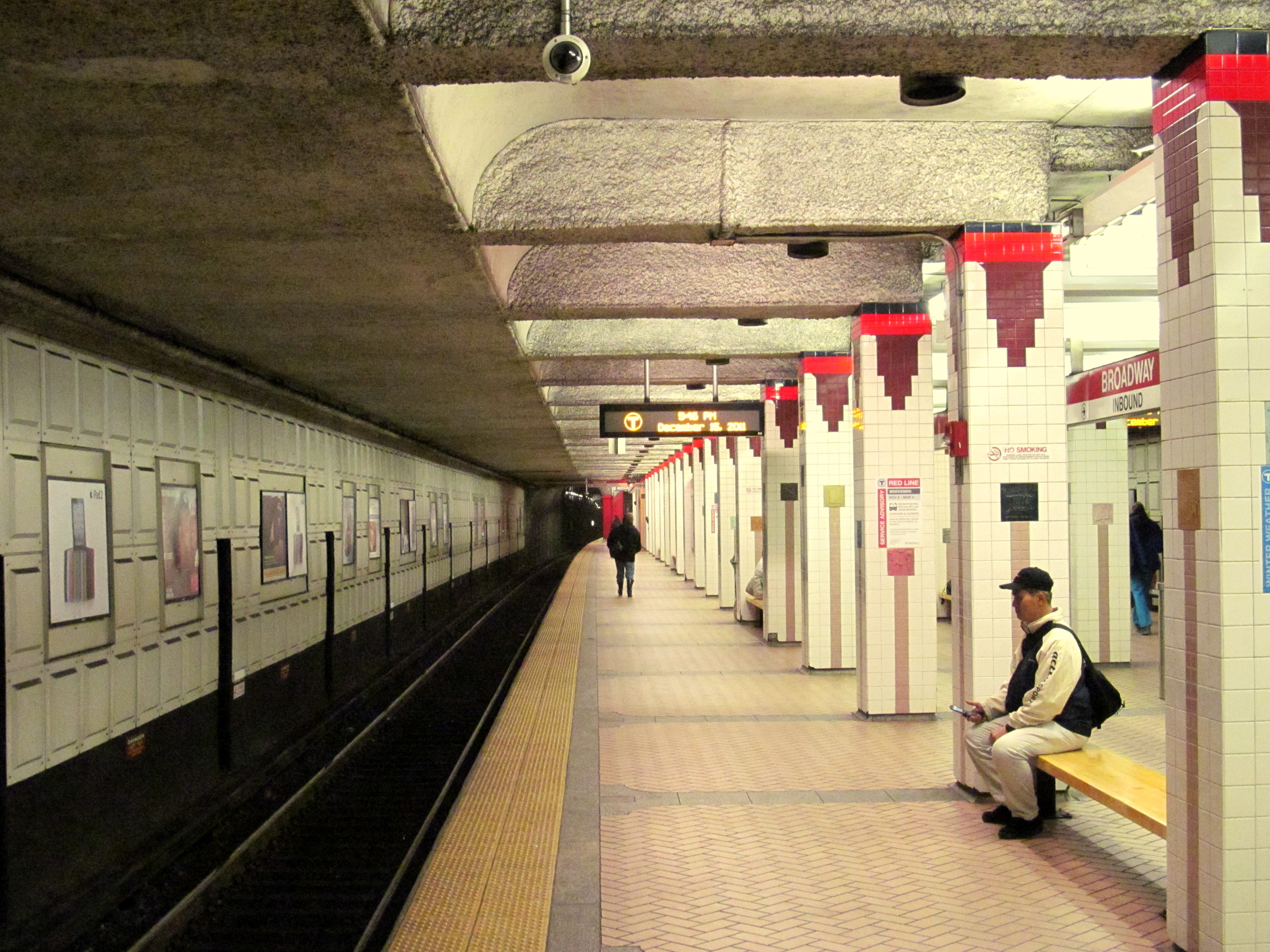
A replica of a Boston subway track, similar to that shown here at Broadway station, was created on a soundstage specifically for this episode.

"Medusa" was written by executive producer Frank Spotnitz and directed by Richard Compton. Reportedly, because of the scope of the episode, a "huge budget" was allotted for the entry. The subway set created for this episode was designed to mirror the actual Boston subway. According to co-star Robert Patrick, "They got us in there, and we did it, and they built a huge subway tunnel set on a soundstage." Patrick later described the set as "the biggest damned thing I'd ever seen in my life." In real life, the Boston subway system is "fondly" called the T, short for the Massachusetts Bay Transportation Authority. In "Medusa", the "T", was changed to an "M" "for fictional purposes".

Cheri Montesanto-Medcalf and Matthew Mungle, the show's make-up effect producers, used several unorthodox ingredients to create the effect of melted flesh; in addition to the use of normal prosthetic make-up, the two also used a combination of figs and Fruit Roll-Ups. Several of the characters in the episode were named after real-life individuals: First, the characters of Hellura Lyle and Kai Bowe were named after two Writers Guild trainees who served in The X-Files writing room. Second, the character Steven Melnick is named after the Vice President of Media Relations for 20th Century Fox Television. Melnick had formerly served as the publicist for the series.

== Broadcast and reception ==
"Medusa" first aired on Fox on February 11, 2001. The episode earned a Nielsen household rating of 8.2, meaning that it was seen by 8.2% of the nation's estimated households. The episode was seen by 13.8 million viewers. The episode ranked as the 41st most-watched episode for the week ending February 11. The episode subsequently debuted in the United Kingdom on the BBC Two on May 26, 2002.

Critical reception to the episode was mostly mixed. Robert Shearman, in his book Wanting to Believe: A Critical Guide to The X-Files, Millennium & The Lone Gunmen gave the episode a mixed review and rated it two-and-a-half stars out of five. Despite writing that "on paper ['Medusa' is] the right episode at the right time", the author criticized the episode, noting that "the teaser never really makes sense in light of the relations offered, the appearance of the mute boy is a messy contrivance, and the ending is too abrupt." Zack Handlen of The A.V. Club rated the episode a "B−". While noting that the episode possessed "a few decent ideas, and a wasted setting", the "story never sparks". He largely blamed the episode's antagonistic organism, noting that they are not "all that memorable" and "not even all that monster-y". Despite this, he wrote positively of the show's use of Scully, arguing that, "the fun of the episode is watching Scully watch Doggett and his team … slowly work through the closed off subway tunnels, finding bodies wrapped in plastic and other mysteries beside."

Paula Vitaris from Cinefantastique gave the episode a slightly negative review and rated it one-and-a-half stars out of four. Despite noting, "after episodes about butt-crawling and vomiting, it's a relief to have one in which people die when their skin and muscles are fried away by microscopic sea creatures called medusas", Vitaris was critical of the plot, likening it to "cliche[d]" 1970's movies that featured the "obstreperous official insisting the plane must fly or the skyscraper is fire-proof, even when the potential for catastrophe is staring him in the face." Spotnitz later admitted during a Reddit IAmA that the episode was his least-favorite that he had written because "the concept just wasn't clear or compelling enough to sustain the hour."

== Bibliography ==
- Hurwitz, Matt; Knowles, Chris (2008). The Complete X-Files. Insight Editions. ISBN 978-1933784809.
- Shearman, Robert (2009). Wanting to Believe: A Critical Guide to The X-Files, Millennium & The Lone Gunmen. Mad Norwegian Press. ISBN 978-0975944691.

This article incorporates material derived from the "Medusa" article on the X-Files wiki at Fandom (formerly Wikia) and is licensed under the Creative Commons Attribution-Share Alike 3.0 License (April 26, 2012).
