= Betrayal (British TV series) =

British television series

- Screenplay by: David Eldridge
- Directed by: Julian Jarrold
- Starring: Shaun Evans; Romola Garai; Gamba Cole; Zahra Ahmadi; Nikki Amuka-Bird; Omid Djalili; Paddy Rowan
- Composer: Adrian Johnston
- Country of origin: United Kingdom
- Original language: English
- No. of series: 1
- No. of episodes: 4

Production
- Executive producers: Damien Timmer; Shaun Evans; David Eldridge; Julian Jarrold; Tom Leggett
- Producer: Irma Inniss
- Running time: 46 minutes
- Production company: Mammoth Screen

Original release
- Network: ITVX
- Release: 8 February 2026

Betrayal is a 2026 British television drama series set in the world of espionage. It was directed by Julian Jarrold and stars Shaun Evans, Romola Garai, Gamba Cole, Zahra Ahmadi, Nikki Amuka-Bird and Omid Djalili. It was written by David Eldridge and produced by Mammoth Screen for ITV.

== Premise ==
A British agent working for MI5 detects a threat to national security.

== Cast ==
- Shaun Evans as John Hughes, an MI5 officer in the State Threats Division
- Romola Garai as Dr. Claire Wardly, a general practitioner and John's wife
- Gamba Cole as Rudy Kember, an MI5 analyst in the State Threats Division
- Zahra Ahmadi as Mehreen Askari-Evans, an MI6 officer on secondment to MI5
- Nikki Amuka-Bird as Simone Grant, an MI5 official and Hughes' superior in the State Threats Division
- Omid Djalili as Qasem Asadi, a Major General in the Islamic Revolutionary Guard Corps
- Emma Cunniffe as Eve Hardy, John and Claire's marriage counsellor
- Anthony Flanagan as Craig Beeston, a heroin dealer in Greater Manchester
- Hayley Tamaddon as Fatemah Feyzi, an Iranian dissident who runs Persia Live UK
- Georgina Rylance as Penelope Thomas, one of Johns contacts in MI6

== Episodes ==
No.	Title	Directed by	Written by	Original release date
1	"Piles"	Julian Jarrold	David Eldridge	8 February 2026
MI5 officer John Hughes meets with Iranian criminal Ehsan Taremi, who offers intel on an upcoming mass casualty event. However, Ehsan is executed by a man who John fights and kills. At his debrief, John's superiors dismiss Ehsan’s death as a gangland hit, as he stole from heroin dealer Craig Beeston who he worked for as a Farsi translator. John is criticised and offered redundancy, which his estranged wife Claire urges him to take. John plans to hand over the case to Mehreen Askari-Evans, on secondment from MI6. He pays Jordan, a runner for Beeston, for details on Ehsan’s wife, Mona. When looking for her in an Iranian dissident meetup, Mehreen and John are kidnapped by Beeston, who says he didn’t kill Ehsan and is looking for Mona too. Beeston believes their cover, Guardian journalists writing about the drug trade, and releases them. After locating Mona, she says Ehsan talked to someone about ‘The General’ before he died and gives John a laptop. John and MI5 analyst Rudy Kember determine Ehsan was stalking vocal social media dissident Fatemah Feyzi, theorising her upcoming talk in Liverpool could be the potential target.
2	"Ordinary Milk"	Julian Jarrold	David Eldridge	8 February 2026
John theorises the IRGC have hired Beeston’s gang to attack Feyzi’s talk, to oppose the UK's involvement in denuclearisation talks. MI5 official Simone Grant allows John and Mehreen to speak with Feyzi, who refuses to cancel her talk without evidence and denies knowing the Taremi’s. John finds heroin in Ehsan’s storage unit, but Mona denies his complicity. John tells Simone he thinks the drugs were planted by Beeston to distract them, but as he refused redundancy he is to be demoted. He also discovers Claire is considering divorce. John meets with Jordan, who says Beeston told Ehsan to watch Feyzi and ‘The General’ is Iranian. John bugs Beeston’s lieutenant Karlson, and hears ‘The General’ is arriving the following day. John meets his old contact Penelope, who confirms ‘The General’ will arrive in the UK and the Iranians may use sarin on UK soil. Grant reassigns John to Protection Command. Jordan is killed by Beeston. Tracking Karlson, John determines ‘The General’ is landing in Epping, Essex. Identifying him as Qasem Asadi, his bodyguards open fire on the two as he lands. Mehreen discreetly warns Asadi he is being tracked.
3	"A Thing, Thing"	Julian Jarrold	David Eldridge	8 February 2026
John and Mehreen follow Asadi to a hotel. However, Mehreen places her earwig in tin foil and meets with Asadi, warning him MI5 have bugged his hotel room and she will continue with the ploy. Unaware of her plans, Kember and Grant monitor their feed, blaming the four minute break on tech issues. John has Kember check Mehreen’s kit. John finds Claire having an affair with her boss and she leaves him. John and Mehreen get drunk and sleep together. In her apartment, he finds a drawer with rials and a pistol. Penelope tells John that Mehreen was kidnapped on the Iranian border and was MIA for two months, but was repatriated with no security concerns. MI5 watches recordings from Asadi’s hotel, but deems the threat low enough to pass to the police only. Rudy shows John Mehreen’s decoded audio, and he confronts her. She claims Asadi has been MI6's hardliner mole for twenty years. He has been forced to authorise the Feyzi attack to maintain his cover, but she says the device will be sabotaged. John tracks the last location of Jordans phone, finding his dead body and a sarin lab before being knocked out by Beeston's lieutenant Wesley.
4	"Soup to Nuts"	Julian Jarrold	David Eldridge	8 February 2026
John escapes Beeston’s custody after disarming Wesley, and tells Grant about the sarin, but is told that MI6 have taken over the operation. He warns Feyzi, but she proceeds with the talk, which goes ahead without incident. Undeterred, John theorises Asadi’s family is being threatened to force him to arrange a real attack, and Mehreen has either lost control of him or is colluding. Asadi kidnaps Claire, John and their nanny Marta. John determines Asadi’s bodyguard Hossein is actually his handler. Mehreen discovers Asadi’s family is missing in Tehran and confronts them. Asadi kills Hossein and admonishes MI6 for not extracting his family sooner, saying the upcoming attack is on their heads. He says Mehreen arranged Ehsan’s death and framed him for drug theft to distract MI5, but she kills him when he threatens Claire. Kember and John convince Grant that another dissident event in Stockport is being targeted. She goes against MI6 and deploys CTSFO and hazmat who evacuate civilians, kill Beeston and Wesley and deactivate the device. Afterwards, Grant permits John to stay at MI5. Mehreen confirms she had Ehsan framed and killed to protect MI6’s reputation, and that the assassin John killed was an MI6 agent. She questions if he has the stomach to remain in intelligence work.

== Production ==
The four-part series was announced by ITVX in September 2024. It was produced by Irma Inniss, with executive producers including Damien Timmer, Eldridge, Jarrold, Tom Leggett, and Shaun Evans.

Filming took place in 2025, with locations including Chester, Liverpool, Manchester and Stockport.

== Broadcast ==
The series aired on ITV1 and ITVX on 8 February 2026.

== Reception ==
The Guardian gave the series 3 out of 5 stars, writing: "When your drama’s protagonist has an extraordinary job where lives are on the line, how gritty and believable can their personal woes plausibly be? Betrayal’s selling point is that it commits as fully to the portrait of a relationship in distress as it does to the spy adventures, but it’s not an easy marriage. ... Betrayal tries to square the circle by making the thriller part of the show dour as well, locating the action in dirty car parks, flat-roofed pubs, musty B&Bs and high streets littered with crap takeaway joints. Oblique, Ipcress File camera angles accentuate the malaise. It’s all as bilious and knackered as John, whose time in the office is a series of tetchy face-offs marked by him railing against sissy modernity ... Like his co-star Garai, Shaun Evans succeeds more in spite of the material he’s given than because of it, bringing a bewildered vulnerability to John’s struggle to be better. John doesn’t like who he is; Betrayal isn’t sure what it is."

The Radio Times wrote: "An impressive Evans isn't enough to save this ITV spy series that's full of tired tropes. ... Perhaps the biggest shame of all is that the series wastes the talents of its actors, particularly Shaun Evans who puts in a really rather astounding performance. Raw, emotional, funny, it hits all the beats, and you can tell how much dedication he has brought to this project. Romola Garai is also far better than the material she's been given, while Zahra Ahmadi is perhaps the one person who is given her due, with her character Mehreen's storyline being by far the most engaging element of the series."
