= Justine Mitchell =

Irish actress

- Born: 1973 (age 52–53); Dublin, Ireland
- Occupation: Actress
- Years active: 1997–present

Justine Mitchell is an Irish actress. She is best known for playing Elaine Lynch in the Irish thriller series Smother.

== Early life ==
Mitchell was born in Dublin in 1973 to Denis Mitchell, a barrister, and later a judge in Bermuda; he was formerly an RTE journalist who was a major inspiration for her career and helped her with her first sketch. When she was 12, her family moved to Hong Kong where she was bullied for her Irish accent. She said theatre helped her stay calm during tough times, and developed a posh English accent. After returning to Ireland she studied drama at Trinity College Dublin. She moved to London where she worked various jobs aside from acting including working for Brentford F.C.

== Career ==
Prior to becoming a television star, Mitchell had a very successful theatre career. She was the winner of the Irish Times Best Supporting Actress in 2002 and of the UK Theatre Award for Best Supporting Actor in 2015. Her first big role came playing Elaine Lynch in the thriller series Smother. She made a one off appearance in the sitcom Derry Girls where portrayed the adult version of Janette. She is currently playing Sandra in the Irish thriller series These Sacred Vows.

== Personal life ==
Her favourite shows as a child were Anything Goes, Wanderly Wagon, and Mister Ed. She was heavily influenced by Linda Carter of Wonder Woman while her favourite ever show is I Love Lucy. In February 2026 she stated her current favourite show is Barry starring Bill Hader.

== Filmography ==
=== Film ===
Year	Title	Role	Notes
1997	Painted Lady	Nurse	
2003	Goldfish Memory	Kate	
2003	Conspiracy of Silence	Assistant Floor Manager	
2003	Citizen Verdict	Jessica Landers	
2003	The Honeymooners	Fiona	
2004	Inside I'm Dancing	Doctor	
2005	A Cock and Bull Story	Tony's Director	
2005	Song of Songs	Laura	
2005	Imagine Me & You	Laura	
2007	I Want Candy	Wailing Daughter	
2009	Sleep With Me	Catrin	
2011	Siberia	Kelly	Short
2011	National Theatre Live: King Lear	Regan	
2013	The Stag	Linda	
2021	The Mauritanian	Cathy Taylor	
2022	Maryland	PC Eddowes	
2025	Hamnet	Joan	

=== Television ===
Year	Title	Role	Notes
2002	Doctor Who: The Monthly Adventures	Lucy Martin	Episode; Seasons of Fear
2005	New Tricks	Scarlet	Episode; Old and Cold
2006	Afterlife	Claire	Episode; Your Hand in Mine
2006	Doctors	Clare Wharton	Episode; One Part TLC, Two Parts Shoe Leather
2008	Waking the Dead	Una Doyle	2 episodes
2009	Psych Ward	Valerie Johnson	2 episodes
2010	Wild at Heart	Julie Kagona	Episode; #5.2
2010	Your Bad Self	Woman	6 episodes
2012	Harry & Paul	Various	Episode; #4.2
2013	The Suspicions of Mr Whicher	Sister Anne	Episode; The Murder of Mr Whicher
2014	Amber	Maeve Flynn-Dunne	4 episodes
2019	Pure	Connie	2 episodes
2019	Cheat	DI Bould	4 episodes
2020	Finding Joy	Maeve Morris	2 episodes
2020-2021	Trying	Lizzie	3 episodes
2022	Derry Girls	Adult Janette	Episode; The Reunion
2022	Conversations with Friends	Paula	5 episodes
2022	A Spy Among Friends	Eleanor Philby	Episode; No Man's Land
2021-2023	Smother	Elaine Lynch	18 episodes
2023	The Crown	Sarah McCorquodale	Episode; Aftermath
2024	The Dry	Aine Harrington	Episode; Camping
2024	Industry	Rose Winter	2 episodes
2024	Storyland	Ruth's Mother on Phone	Episode; Shush
2024	Bad Sisters	Eileen Ryan	3 episodes
2024	Black Doves	Emma Yarrick	2 episodes
2025	Lynley	Beth Larwood	Episode; Careless in Red
2026	How to Get to Heaven from Belfast	Rossa	2 episodes
2026	These Sacred Vows	Sandra	3 episodes
