= Peter McDonald (actor) =

Irish actor and director

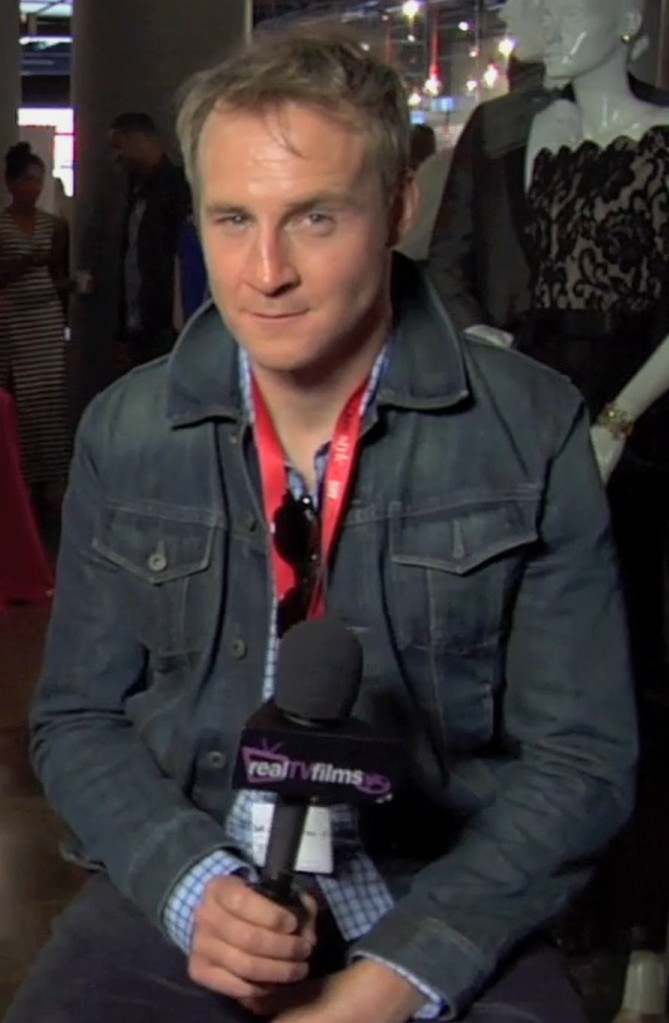
- McDonald in 2013
- Born: 28 January 1972 (age 54); Dublin, Ireland
- Occupation: Actor
- Years active: 1997–present

Peter McDonald (born 28 January 1972) is an Irish stage and screen actor and director. He was nominated for an Academy Award for Best Live Action Short Film for his short film Pentecost. He is also known for his appearances as William Kenzie in The Batman and The Penguin.

== Early life and education ==
McDonald grew up in Mount Merrion, County Dublin. He was educated at St. Michael's College, Dublin and graduated from University College Dublin with a Bachelor of Arts, English and a Master of Fine Arts, English in 1994. He got his start in theatre as part of UCD's Drama Society and was a member of the Fly by Night Theatre Company.

== Career ==
=== Acting ===
McDonald has appeared in films including Felicia's Journey (written and directed by Atom Egoyan, 1999) and When Brendan Met Trudy (written by Roddy Doyle and directed by Kieron J. Walsh, 2000); television series (the BBC's Sea of Souls and Channel 4's Green Wing); and theatre productions both in Dublin and London, including The Lieutenant of Inishmore and Days of Wine and Roses.

He made his debut in 1997 as the character Git Hynes in the Irish comedy I Went Down, co-starring with Brendan Gleeson. He co-starred with Jonathan Pryce and Aidan Gillen in Glengarry Glen Ross at the Apollo Theatre in 2007. He features prominently in RTÉ's 2010 comedy show Your Bad Self which he also co-wrote.

In 2014, he starred in the BBC Drama This Town. In March 2026, he played DI Craig Stanhope, the husband of DS Annie Cassidy (played by Eve Myles) in ITV's Gone. He appears in Power Ballad (2026), which he co-wrote with John Carney.

=== Writing ===
McDonald wrote and directed Pentecost, a live action short film which was nominated for the 2012 Academy Award for Best Live Action Short Film. He co-wrote and acted in the full-length movie, The Stag, which was nominated for six Irish Film and Television Academy (IFTA) awards in 2014. he co-wrote Power Ballad with John Carney.

== Filmography ==
=== Film ===
- I Went Down (1997) as Git Hynes
- Felicia's Journey (1999) as Johnny Lysaght
- Captain Jack (1999) as Andy Watts
- The Opportunists (1999) as Michael 'Mikey' Lawler, aka Michael Kelly
- Saltwater (2000) as Frank Beneventi
- Nora (2000) as Stanislaus Joyce
- Some Voices (2000) as Dave
- When Brendan Met Trudy (2000) as Brendan
- Blow Dry (2001) as Vincent
- Don't Tempt Me (2001) as Henry
- Spin the Bottle (2003) as Tommo
- God's Early Work (short film, 2004) as Satan (voice)
- Festival (2005) as Architect
- The Headsman (2005) as Georg
- Spacemen Three (short film, 2008) as Dr. Neil Giffords
- The Damned United (2009) as Johnny Giles
- Wreckers (2011) as Gary
- Anthropopopometry (short film, 2013) as Steve
- The Stag (2013) as The Machine, also co-writer with John Butler
- Holy Spirit (short film, 2016) as Preacher
- England is Mine (2017) as Peter Morrissey
- Fanny Lye Deliver'd (2019) as The High Sheriff for the Council of State
- The Dig (2021) as Guy Maynard
- The Batman (2022) as William Kenzie
- Woken (2024) as Doctor Henry
- Bagman (2024) as Jake McKee Sr.
- Heart (short film, 2025)
- Saipan (2025) as Mick Byrne
- Power Ballad (2026) as Sandy

=== Television ===
- Kings in Grass Castles (mini-series, 1998) as Gamekeeper
- Paths to Freedom (2000) as Tomo
- Fergus's Wedding (2002) as Tony
- Killing Hitler (TV film, 2003) as MI Staff Officer L / BX
- Spooks (2003) as Tim Prachett (uncredited)
- Sea of Souls (2004) as Dr. Andrew Gemmill
- The Family Man (TV film, 2006) as Steve
- Green Wing (2006) as Director
- City of Vice (mini-series, 2008) as Tom Jones
- Your Bad Self (2010) as various characters; also co-writer
- Titanic (mini-series, 2012) as Jim Maloney
- Moone Boy (2012–2015) as Liam Moone
- Mayday (mini-series, 2013) as Alan Hill
- Ripper Street (2014) as Dr. Anthony Rolle
- No Offence (2015) as Patrick Llewellyn
- Murder (mini-series, 2016) as Leo Durridge
- Thirteen (mini-series, 2016) as Mark White
- The Last Kingdom (2017) as Brother Trew
- Finding Joy (2018–2020) as Canine Aidan (voice)
- Dublin Murders (2019) as Jonathan Devlin
- A Discovery of Witches (2019–2022) as Baldwin Montclair
- Hollington Drive (2021) as David
- Mandy (2022) as Dr. Gould
- This Town (2024) as Eamonn Quinn
- The Penguin (mini-series, 2024) as William Kenzie
- Gone (2026) as DI Craig Stanhope

== Theatre ==
- The Weir (Donmar Theatre, London, 2013)
- The Caretaker (Trafalgar Studios 2010)
- Glengarry Glen Ross (Apollo Theatre 2007)
- Exiles (National Theatre: Cottesloe Theatre 2006)
- Resurrection Blues (Old Vic 2006)
- Aristocrats (National Theatre: Lyttelton Theatre 2005)
- Days of Wine and Roses (Donmar 2005)
- The Lieutenant of Inishmore (Garrick Theatre 2002)
- White Horses (Gate Theatre, Dublin 2001)
- A Lie of the Mind (Donmar 2001)
- The Wexford Trilogy (Oxford Stage Company tour 2001)
- Inventing Fortune's Wheel (Firkin Crane Theatre, Cork)
- Van Gogh's Ear, The Stars Lose Their Glory, The Brother (International Bar, Dublin)
- The Stranger (Players' Theatre, Dublin)

== Awards and nominations ==
Year	Award	Category	Result	Work
2000	Irish Film and Television Awards	Best Actor	Won	Saltwater
2011	Tribeca Film Festival	Best Narrative Short	Nominated	Pentecost
2012	Academy Awards	Best Short Film, Live Action shared with: Eimear O'Kane	Nominated	Pentecost
2014	Irish Film and Television Awards	Best Supporting Actor – Film	Nominated	The Stag
