= Paths to Freedom =

Irish television series

- Written by: Michael McElhatton & Ian Fitzgibbon
- Starring: Michael McElhatton; Brendan Coyle
- Country of origin: Ireland
- Original language: English
- No. of seasons: 1
- No. of episodes: 6

Production
- Running time: 24 minutes (avg)

Original release
- Network: Raidió Teilifís Éireann (RTÉ)
- Release: 13 November – 18 December 2000

Paths to Freedom is a satirical comedy series which aired on the Irish television network RTÉ Two in 2000. The show stars two characters, Jeremy (Brendan Coyle) and Rats (Michael McElhatton), who have both recently been released from a Dublin prison. The show takes the format of a mockumentary, with a fly-on-the-wall camera crew following the two characters, who are from thoroughly different backgrounds, as they try to reintegrate back into society. There were six episodes of the show produced, the first airing on 13 November 2000, and the final episode airing one month later. The series was followed-up by a movie based on the character Rats, Spin the Bottle.

== Characters ==
=== Jeremy ===
Dr. Jeremy Fitzgerald, played by Brendan Coyle, was a distinguished gynaecologist, living in the affluent Dublin suburb of Blackrock, before being convicted of dangerous driving causing injury. He was sentenced to a custodial sentence and sent to a Dublin prison. After his release, with his license to practice medicine lost, Jeremy pursues the release of his controversial book, 'Women inside Out'. However, he struggles to find a publisher given his recent legal troubles, and this eventually leads to a breakdown. During the series, Jeremy displays his love towards a wealthy style of life, driving a new Mercedes-Benz, playing golf at his local club 'The Fitzhatton', and repeatedly describing his admiration of Michael Flatley. This is demonstrated at one point in the series when Jeremy is questioned by the camera crew as to what affect prison has had on him, and he responds that it caused him to lose his 'no-claims bonus' and raise his golf handicap by six strokes. The legal costs of defending himself in the case brought by the Ukrainian man that he hit while drink driving are large, and this causes the Fitzgeralds to sell their home in Blackrock to raise funds. Repeatedly, Jeremy disputes the man's claim that he is paralysed, and at one point Jeremy attacks the man in attempt to prove he is lying. At this stage in the series, Jeremy is seriously mentally ill, and he soon takes up home in a tent on the 7th green at the Fitzhatton. The series ends with Jeremy, now separated from his wife Helen (Deirdre O'Kane), in full-time psychiatric care .

=== Rats ===
Raymond "Rats" Doyle, played by Michael McElhatton is a character that has been in and out of trouble throughout his life. In the series, he also has just been released from prison, having been convicted of burglary. Rats struggles to find a job, with his problems compounded by the fact that his wife Sharon, along with his two children Tarquin and Snoopies, has left him. Rats has several jobs in the course of the series including security, working in a fast-food restaurant and busking. While busking, Rats performs the poetry that he writes in his spare time, and though it is crude and childish, he sees it as a serious expression of his feelings and beliefs. The uncensored and brash nature of the poetry attracts the attention of the Garda Síochána, and lands Rats in further trouble. Throughout the series, we see Rats concentrate on trying to bring his band, 'spermdotcom', into the mainstream. The band did experience some minor success some years beforehand, reaching No. 27 in the charts in Finland. The series ends with the band continuing to struggle, having been conned out of £400 they had paid to arrange a gig, and eventually having to play this gig in a small gay bar in Dublin.

=== Helen Fitzgerald ===
Helen Fitzgerald, played by Deirdre O'Kane, is the middle class, middle-aged wife of Jeremy. Keen to maintain an aura of nonchalance, stability and normality, she repeatedly expresses her indignation at Jeremy's treatment by the justice system, and questions the validity of both the charges pressed against him and the credibility of the paralysed victim of Jeremy's hit-and-run. Helen lives a lavish lifestyle, and at various points throughout the series she is seen dining in expensive restaurants, attending theatrical productions and hosting garden parties. As the plot develops, we observe Helen's increasingly superficial nature, most particularly in relation to her husband. As Jeremy's mental well-being declines, Helen becomes increasingly frustrated with his inability to communicate coherently and his violent mood swings. Her frustration is also of a sexual nature, and in episode 6 she invites both Rats and the series' camera crew to have sex with her in her family home, with Jeremy residing in a tent in the back garden. Further instances of Helen's marital infidelity are also alluded to, and we learn that she engaged in sexual relations while on holidays with her friend Gwen in Paris, with a French man who 'rogered her senseless' on a 'crate of aubergines'. In later episodes, Helen is rarely seen without a glass of white wine in hand.

=== Tomo ===
Tomo, played by Peter McDonald, is Rat's best friend and fellow musician in the band Sperm.com, in which he plays guitar. His long black hair and style of dress identify him as a heavy metal fan; he is seen to wear t-shirts featuring the bands No Sweat and Ministry during the series. He is portrayed as being quite unintelligent – a classic comedy buffoon – and also as being overwhelmed when it comes to contact with the opposite sex.

=== Barney ===
''Barney'' (affectionately referred to as "Barnser") is a character in the popular comedy series ''Paths to Freedom'' on the Irish television network RTÉ Two. He is portrayed by Darragh Kelly. Barney is depicted as Jeremy's closest companion and golfing partner. He is blindly supportive of Jeremy and fails to see his friend's shortcomings, appearing somewhat of a side-kick. Even as the series progresses, and he appears to grow increasingly embarrassed by Jeremy's behavior, he never overtly speaks out against him.

== Reception ==
In 2000, The Irish Times said that while the "spoof documentary series" concept behind Paths to Freedom was "at least promising in concept...laughs in theory do not always translate into reality, even though Deirdre O'Kane, Gary Cooke and Michael McElhatton read like a formidable team".

In 2025, the Sunday Mirror said that Paths to Freedom is "regarded as one of the best comedy series RTE ever made". In 2020, the Irish Independent said, "There are hardcore comedy fans who attest that Paths To Freedom is one of the finest Irish comedies ever made, and laid the groundwork for countless other shows".
