= Gamba Cole =

British actor

- Born: Bristol, England
- Education: Richmond upon Thames College
- Occupation: Actor
- Television: The Outlaws

Gamba Cole is a British actor. He is known for his appearance in the British television series The Outlaws.

== Early life ==
Born in Bristol, he lived in the St Paul’s area of Bristol before moving to London. Cole studied a BTEC in performing arts at Richmond upon Thames College, London.

== Career ==
Cole worked as a security guard before his acting career progressed in 2014, when he caught the eye of actor/director Clint Dyer. Dyer asked him audition for a play he was directing at the Theatre Stratford East called Kingston 14 (written by Roy Williams) and subsequently helped him to sign up for an acting agency.

Cole’s screen acting credits have since included Death in Paradise. He also appeared in A Discovery of Witches in which he appeared with Matthew Goode and Guerilla with Idris Elba and Freida Pinto. His film credits include The Protégé with Samuel L. Jackson and Michael Keaton.

He has a lead role in the Stephen Merchant led comedy-drama series The Outlaws alongside an ensemble cast including Christopher Walken and Eleanor Tomlinson. This role continued into a second season as the character expanded his horizons, and a third series was broadcast from 30 May 2024.

In 2025, he portrayed Raheem Sterling in James Graham stage play Dear England at the Olivier Theatre in London.

== Personal life ==
Cole is a keen football fan.

== Filmography ==
Year	Title	Role	Notes
2013	Gone Too Far!	Shane	Film
2016	Damilola, Our Loved Boy	Junior	TV film
2017	Guerrilla	Tim	2 episodes
2018	Lucky Man	Andy	1 episode
2019	Soon Gone: A Windrush Chronicle	Malcolm	TV Movie
2019	Hanna	Anton	2 episodes
2021	A Discovery of Witches	Corner	1 episode
2021	The Protégé	Benny	Film
2021-present	The Outlaws	Christian/Ben	Main role
2023	Death in Paradise	Tye	1 episode
2023	Three Little Birds	Gregory	1 episode
2026	Betrayal	Rudy Kember	Filming
