= Crush Proof =

1998 Irish film

- Theatrical film poster
- Directed by: Paul Tickell
- Written by: John Edwards; James Mathers
- Starring: Darren Healy; Viviana Verveen; Michael McElhatton; Fiona Glascott
- Release dates: September 8, 1998 (Venice); June 4, 1999 (UK)
- Running time: 91 mins.
- Countries: Germany; Ireland; The Netherlands; United Kingdom
- Language: English

Crush Proof (stylized as CRUSHPROOF) is a 1998 international drama film, directed by Paul Tickell; written by James Mathers and John Edwards; and starring Darren Healy, Viviana Verveen, Fiona Glascott, and Michael McElhatton. It premiered at the 55th Venice International Film Festival in 1998, before being released to British theaters in 1999.

== Synopsis ==
Recently released con man Neal aims to reconnect with his son, parents, and criminal horse-riding gang, but encounters an informant who betrayed him in Dublin's lawless "pony club" underworld.

== Cast ==
- Darren Healy as Neal
- Viviana Verveen as Nuala
- Jeff O'Toole as Liam
- Mark Dunne as Sean
- Michael McElhatton as Det. Sgt. Hogan
- Lisa Fleming as Suki
- Mary Murray as Red Andi
- Fiona Glascott as Aisling

== Reception ==
In positive reviews, Trevor Lewis of Empire gives the film 3/5, lauding Paul Tickell's "ingenious debut" and "poetic iconography".

In a slightly negative review, N.B. from Time Out says "the plot is fraught with undirected bombast and melodramatic contrivance".
