= Alejandro Patiño =

American actor

- Born: March 16, 1960 (age 66); Santa Maria, California
- Occupation: Actor
- Years active: 1985–present

Alejandro Patiño (born March 16, 1960), is an American actor.

== Career ==
He has guest starred on several television programs including the recurring role of Ralph, Gabrielle Solis's new gardener, on the ABC series Desperate Housewives. Other appearances include House, Roswell, It's Always Sunny in Philadelphia, Arrested Development and Family Law.

From 2013 to 2014, Patino costarred as Cesar on the FX series The Bridge. He has starred as Ernesto in the independent film Papi Chulo and as the cantina bartender in the Coen brothers’ The Ballad of Buster Scruggs.

He has portrayed Bossman in the live comedy production Chico's Angels, a parody of the 1976–81 TV series Charlie's Angels, since 2003.

As of late 2015 and up until 2016, Patino has been appearing in Popeyes Louisiana Kitchen commercials in U.S. Hispanic market media.

== Personal life ==
Patino was born in Santa Maria, California.

== Filmography ==
=== Film ===
Year	Title	Role	Notes
1987	Nightforce	Cantina Tough	Video
1994	No Ordinary Love	Juan Pablo	
1998	La Cucaracha	Fruit Vendor	
1999	Bowfinger	Sanchez	
2000	Growing Up Brad	Paramount Security Guard	TV movie
2000	Very Mean Men	Jose	
2000	Broken	Sr. Gutierrez	Short
2001	Two Coyotes	Casper	
2002	Just Can't Get Enough	Hernando	
2002	The Trip	Gas Station Owner	
2003	Los desaparecidos	-	Short
2003	The Silent Cross	Moises	
2004	Robbing Peter	Danny	
2005	Juarez, Mexico	Doctor	Video
2005	Tequila Shots	Walter	
2005	Reeker	Velez the Paramedic	
2005	Taco Chick and Salsa Girl	Hostage #3	Short
2005	Sueño	Uncle Alfonso	
2005	His Name Is Bobby	Joe Martinez	Short
2005	Left at the Rio Grande	Ralph	Short
2005	The Kid & I	Apartment Manager	
2007	Handle with Care	Marty	Short
2007	Delta Farce	Juan	
2007	Shelter	Moe	
2007	Cooking with Kay	Pepe	Short
2007	This Solace Eternal	Electrician	Short
2007	Hardly Married	Rudy Gonzalez	Short
2007	Sands of Oblivion	Raoul	TV movie
2007	Towelhead	Waiter	
2007	Ping Pong Playa	Boss - Steve	
2007	The Heartbreak Kid	River Crossing Father	
2007	Locked Out	Jerry Anderson	Short
2008	The Last Supper	Henry	Short
2008	Emilio	Fausto	
2008	Lower Learning	Helado	
2008	No Man's Land: The Rise of Reeker	Medic	
2008	The Cross Before Me	Willie	Short
2009	Fast & Furious	Gas Truck Driver	
2009	All Americana	Marta's Father	Short
2009	Dark Room Theater	Detective 1	
2009	The Soloist	Construction Worker	
2009	Aussie and Ted's Great Adventure	Carlos	
2009	Chico's Angels: 24ish	Bossman	Short
2010	The Runaways	Grocery Store Manager	
2010	TypeA	Mr. Herrera	Short
2010	Our Family Wedding	Goat Truck Driver	
2010	Guerrilla Garden	Diego	Short
2010	A Border Story	Eliseo Gomez	Short
2010	Iron Man 2	Strawberry Vendor	
2010	Middle of Nowhere	Ernest	Short
2010	The Legend of El Limbo	Gabriel	Short
2011	The Dolphin	Detective	Short
2011	Maddoggin'	Ernesto Diaz Sr.	Short
2012	Casa de mi padre	Hector	
2012	Desert Road Kill'	-	Short
2012	Freeloaders	Hector	
2013	Along the Roadside	Regis	
2013	Expecting	Handy Man	
2013	Inappropriate Comedy	Worker	
2013	Gone Missing	Martin Guzman	TV movie
2013	The Whexican'	Grandfather	Short
2013	Ushers'	Manuel	Short
2014	The T S Ain'ts	Agent Lopez	Short
2014	I'm a Mitzvah	Airline Representative	Short
2014	Ni-Ni	Guzman	Short
2014	Destiny	Santos	Short
2014	Facebook Fatigue	Dad	Short
2014	The Vanished	Gabriel	Short
2014	Not Safe for Work	Fernando the Janitor	
2015	Kill Me	Doctor Rodriguez	Short
2015	Flora Tango'	George	Short
2016	The Duke: Based on the Memoir 'I'm The Duke' by J.P. Duke	Detective Urbina	Short
2016	Shah-k-mate	Captain Ramirez	Short
2016	The Last Beautiful Girl	Edward	
2016	The Best and Worst Days of George Morales' Unnaturally Long Life	George	Short
2016	Love Sanchez	Candy Man	
2017	Blackmail	Carlos	
2017	Take Me	Officer Ramirez	
2017	Tecato	Hector	Short
2017	The American Dream is Dead. Says the Dreamer	-	Short
2017	Bangs	Raul	Short
2018	The Take Off	Frank Rummel	Short
2018	Searching for Waldo	Tito 'Brass' Santos	Short
2018	Marisol	Abuelo Jose	Short
2018	The Ballad of Buster Scruggs	Cantina Bartender	
2018	Killing Edward	Edward	Short
2018	Papi Chulo	Ernesto	
2018	Unimundo 45	Fernando Grande	Short
2018	Broken Together	Doctor Alonso	Short
2019	Take Care	Ramon	Short
2019	Papi Papilloma'	Papi Papilloma	Short
2020	Getting From Here	Gordo	Short
2020	Gary Gonorrhea	Gary Gonorrhea	Short
2020	Lydia Chlamydia	Lydia Chlamydia	Short
2020	Shelter from the Storm	Memo	Short
2020	Lecciones de mi Madre (Lessons from my Mother)'	Furgencio	Short
2020	Double Down	Mexican Heavy	
2021	Customer Service	Toni Rios	Short
2021	Samland	Nacho	
2023	Meet Los Parents	Tapatio	Short
2023	Jerome	Abuelo Kiké Rivera	Short
2023	The Kill Floor	Cesar	Short
2024	Bloody Bridget	Father Jose	
2024	Tacoma	Carlos Chavez	
2025	Window Cleaners	Miguel	Short

=== Television ===
Year	Title	Role	Notes
1985	Dynasty	Valet	Episode: "Reconciliation"
1989	Falcon Crest	Bar Patron	Episode: "Luck Wave"
1992	Silk Stalkings	Rico	Episode: "Scorpio Lover"
1999	ER	Best Man	Episode: "Rites of Spring"
1999	Snoops	County Sherriff	Episode: "Constitution"
2001	Strip Mall	-	Episode: "Hedda Bags Josh"
2001	Family Law	Man	Episode: "Moving On"
2001	Roswell	Santa #3	Episode: "Samuel Rising"
2002	Resurrection Blvd.	Medical Courier	Episode: "Justicia"
2002	Robbery Homicide Division	Hispanic Father	Episode: "A Life of Its Own"
2003	Kingpin	Crony	Episode: "The Odd Couple"
2004	The Shield	Baodelo	Episode: "Safe"
2004	Arrested Development	Mexican Man #1	Episode: "¡Amigos!"
2005	House	Cabbie	Episode: "Cursed"
2005	Wanted	Federal Captian	Episode: "Shoot to Thrill"
2005-06	Desperate Housewives	Ralph the Gardener	Recurring Cast: Season 2
2006	Huff	Cab Driver	Episode: "Maps Don't Talk (Part 2)"
2006	The Unit	Store Owner	Episode: "Non-Permissive Environment"
2006	Criminal Minds	Pablo Vargas	Episode: "Machismo"
2006	Medium	Driver	Episode: "Knowing Her"
2006	The Minor Accomplishments of Jackie Woodman	Valet #2	Episode: "Nemesisyphus"
2006-07	My Name Is Earl	Man/Coyote	Guest Cast: Season 1 & 3
2008	Las Vegas	Augie	Episode: "I Could Eat a Horse"
2008	Weeds	Alphonso	Recurring Cast: Season 4
2008	Ingles Ya!	Flacido Domingo	Main Cast
2008	Cold Case	Esteban '81	Episode: "The Dealer"
2008-12	It's Always Sunny in Philadelphia	Father Juarez	Guest Cast: Season 4 & 8
2009	King's English	Papi	Episode: "Servile Bodies"
2010	Chico's Angels	Bossman	Main Cast
2011	Mr. Sunshine	Steve	Episode: "Pilot"
2011	NCIS: Los Angeles	Day Laborer	Episode: "Enemy Within"
2011	The Protector	Psychic	Episode: "Pilot"
2012	Fred: The Show	Delivery Man	Episode: "Lemon Fred"
2012	Go On	Miguel	Episode: "There's No 'Ryan' In Team"
2012	Raising Hope	Alfredo	Episode: "What Up, Bro?"
2013	Mr. Wang Goes to Hollywood	Taxi Driver	Episode: "Pilot"
2013	East Los High	Don Pepe	Episode: "The New Busboy"
2013-14	The Bridge	Cesar	Recurring Cast
2015	Life in Pieces	Store Owner	Episode: "Godparent Turkey Corn Farts"
2015	Dirty Cues	Vicente	Episode: "The Boss' Boss"
2016	Indoorsy	Norm	Episode: "Landlord"
2017	Superstore	Waiter	Episode: "Spring Cleaning"
2018	Couch Potato Chronicles	Santiago Cruz	Recurring Cast: Season 2
2019	Bad Cop Bad Cop	Angel	Episode: "The Dance"
2020	Gentefied	Chuey	Recurring Cast: Season 1
2020-21	The Family Business	Pepe/HD Wilkins	Guest: Season 2, Recurring Cast: Season 3
2021	Bosch	Juan Rulfo	Recurring Cast: Season 7
2026	Paradise	Roberto	Episode: "The Mailman"
