= Perrier's Bounty =

- Theatrical release poster showing original release date
- Directed by: Ian Fitzgibbon
- Written by: Mark O'Rowe
- Produced by: Elizabeth Karlsen; Alan Moloney; Stephen Woolley
- Starring: Cillian Murphy; Brendan Gleeson; Jim Broadbent; Jodie Whittaker
- Narrated by: Gabriel Byrne
- Cinematography: Seamus Deasy
- Edited by: Tony Cranstoun
- Music by: David Holmes
- Distributed by: Optimum Releasing
- Release dates: September 11, 2009 (Toronto International Film Festival); March 26, 2010 (Ireland)
- Running time: 88 minutes
- Country: Ireland
- Language: English
- Box office: $160,430

Perrier's Bounty is a 2009 Irish black comedy crime film set in modern-day Dublin. Described as an "urban western" by its director Ian Fitzgibbon, it stars Brendan Gleeson as the villainous title character, as well as Cillian Murphy and Jim Broadbent as son and father and Jodie Whittaker as a main character's friend.

Filming was completed in late January 2009, and the film premiered at the 2009 Toronto International Film Festival. It was released in the United Kingdom and Ireland on 26 March 2010.

== Plot ==
The unseen Grim Reaper examines the life of perpetual waster Michael McCrea, who is threatened by gangsters Ivan and Orlando to pay his €1,000 debt to crime boss Darren Perrier. While his neighbor Brenda has made up with her boyfriend Shamie, Michael visits a snooker bar in search of the Mutt, a loan shark, but only finds his drug-dealing friend Clifford. After an altercation with clampers, he is approached by his estranged father Jim, who reveals that he has terminal cancer.

Leaving Jim at a pub to find the Mutt, Michael confronts Shamie for cheating on Brenda, and the Mutt and his associate Dinny invite Michael to join them in a burglary. They break into a house and find pictures of the homeowner cheating on his wife, deciding to blackmail him for €30,000. Assured he will receive his share in the morning, Michael finds his car clamped and is nearly run over by Ivan and Orlando.

Returning home, he discovers a suicidal Brenda has stolen his pistol after being dumped by Shamie. Ivan and Orlando prepare to break Michael's leg, but Brenda shoots Orlando dead and Ivan flees. Jim joins Michael and Brenda as they bury Orlando's body at an escarpment, where they are forced to spend the night in Brenda's car. Meanwhile, Perrier learns that Ivan and Orlando were lovers and tries to comfort the grieving Ivan, declaring a €10,000 bounty on Michael and Brenda.

Jim admits that he does not have cancer, but believes he was visited by the Reaper, who warned that the next time he sleeps, he will die. Burning Brenda's incriminating car, the trio take shelter at a farm, but the farm's owner calls the police. Michael berates Brenda for her devotion to the unfaithful Shamie and she storms off, only to be captured by two police officers. Snatching Michael's gun, Jim hijacks the police car and the trio escape, arranging to pick up Michael's blackmail earnings from the Mutt.

Swapping vehicles with boys joyriding in another stolen car, Brenda catches Shamie with another woman, while Jim helps amateur dog trainers Jerome and Russ teach their Rottweilers to attack. The Mutt and Dinny attempt to collect the bounty on Michael, but Jim knocks them out at gunpoint and the trio leaves with the €30,000. Brenda learns that Michael intervened when he saw a local thug beating up a woman, leading the man to attack Michael's mother; believing his parents blamed him, Michael broke off contact with them, and his mother later moved to County Clare.

At the snooker hall, Michael buys Jim cocaine from Clifford, who summons Perrier and his goons, and a shootout ensues; Clifford is killed, Michael and Brenda escape with a remorseful Shamie, but Jim is left behind. The Mutt and Dinny join forces with Perrier, who cruelly shoots Russ and Jerome's dogs, and takes Jim hostage. Brenda finally ends things with Shamie, and Michael takes his car at gunpoint. A badly beaten Jim calls Michael, explaining that he will soon "take a nap" — true to his vision, he expects to die. Michael and Brenda share a passionate kiss before he departs for Perrier's hideout with his gun and the €30,000.

Captured by Perrier's men, Michael is about to be castrated by a vengeful Ivan, while Perrier kills Dinny and the Mutt to pocket the money. In the confusion, Michael gains the upper hand on Perrier and his men, wounding one of them in the leg and fleeing with his father in Shamie's car. Perrier retrieves an AK-74u and opens fire, mortally wounding Jim, and an enraged Michael shoots Perrier's remaining men and is shot himself. Before Perrier can finish Michael off, Jerome and Russ arrive with their entire club of attack dog enthusiasts. They set their dogs on Perrier, mauling him to death, and take Michael to be treated by a veterinarian.

An impromptu funeral is held for Jim, buried beside the dogs and Orlando, and Brenda and Michael profess their love for each other. They drive to County Clare, where Michael is reunited with his mother, as the Reaper ponders whether Michael has been left a better, more enlightened man.

== Cast ==
- Gabriel Byrne as Voice of The Reaper
- Cillian Murphy as Michael McCrea
- Michael McElhatton as Ivan
- Don Wycherley as Orlando
- Jodie Whittaker as Brenda
- Brendan Coyle as Jerome
- Conleth Hill as Russ
- Domhnall Gleeson as Clifford
- Patrick McCabe as Mulligan
- Ned Dennehy as Clamper
- Glenn Speers as Clamper 2
- Jim Broadbent as Jim McCrea
- Pádraic Delaney as Shamie
- Natalie Britton as Catherine
- Liam Cunningham as The Mutt
- Breffni McKenna as Dinny
- Brendan Gleeson as Darren Perrier
- Francis Magee as Hank
- Wuzza Conlon as Blaise
- Brendan Dempsey as Victor
- Brian Doherty as Kenny
- Jane Brennan as Farmhouse Battleaxe
- Michael Ford-FitzGerald as Garda
- Chris Newman as Teen Joyrider
- Andrew Simpson as Teen 2

== Music ==
Music for the film was created by Belfast musician David Holmes.

== Critical response ==
As of August 2021, Perrier's Bounty holds a 55% approval rating on Rotten Tomatoes based on 44 reviews, with an average rating of 5.60/10. The website's critics consensus reads: "It has interesting characters and a strong cast, but Perrier's Bounty ultimately fails to do anything original with them."

Donald Clarke of The Irish Times gave the film 2/5 stars. Paul Byrne of Movies.ie gave the film 2/5, judging it to be less funny than the film Intermission.

Gary Goldstein of the Los Angeles Times favoured the film, describing it as "A fast-paced and enjoyable if violent diversion that revels in its quirky characters, committed performances and involving twists." Stuart Messham of Maxim wrote "Half comic tour de force and half "urban western", Perrier's Bounty is a 90-minute treat and, in case you hadn't gathered this by now, we recommend it.", awarding the film 5 out of 5 stars.
