= Your Bad Self =

- Genre: Comedy
- Created by: John Butler; Ben Kelly; Eoin Williams
- Directed by: John Butler
- Starring: Andrew Bennett; Karen Egan; Emily Fairman; Tom Farrelly; Domhnall Gleeson; Amy Huberman; Peter McDonald; Michael McElhatton; Justine Mitchell; Hugh O'Conor; Jason O'Mara
- Country of origin: Ireland
- Original language: English
- No. of series: 1
- No. of episodes: 6

Production
- Executive producer: Rebecca O'Flanagan
- Producer: Ben Kelly
- Running time: 30 minutes

Original release
- Network: RTÉ Two
- Release: 26 December 2008

Your Bad Self is an Irish sketch comedy show which was originally broadcast on RTÉ Two on 26 December 2008 at 21:40, before being developed into a series which was shown in 2010.

== History ==
Your Bad Self stars Domhnall Gleeson as well as Michael McElhatton, Justine Mitchell and Peter McDonald. The show was produced by Ben Kelly for Treasure Entertainment (I Went Down and Mad About Dog) and was co-written by Kelly, the director John Butler, Eoin Williams, Justine Mitchell and Emily Fairman. Butler was the co-writer and director of George and Spacemen Three for the Irish Film Board.

In June 2009, RTÉ commissioned a six-part series of Your Bad Self. The series was to be filmed towards the end of 2009 and broadcast early in 2010.

== Reaction ==
John Boland of the Irish Independent sat through it in "stony silence".
