= Ian Fitzgibbon =

Irish filmmaker and actor

- Born: 1962 (age 63–64); Dublin, Ireland
- Occupations: Director, screenwriter, actor
- Known for: Moone Boy (2014); Father Ted (1998); Death of a Superhero (2011)

Ian Fitzgibbon (born 1962) is an Irish film and television director, screenwriter and occasionally actor. He is perhaps best known for directing Spin the Bottle, A Film with Me in It and the Comedy Central UK show Threesome, and for the role of sarcastic Fr. Jessup in Father Ted.

In 2014 he won an IFTA for director television drama for the Sky sitcom Moone Boy.

== Filmography ==
=== Film ===
- Spin the Bottle (2003)
- A Film with Me in It (2008)
- Perrier's Bounty (2009)
- Death of a Superhero (2011)
- Dark Lies the Island (2019)

=== Television (selection) ===
- Paths to Freedom (2000)
- Fergus's Wedding (2002)
- Threesome (2011–2012)
- Raised by Wolves (2013–2016)
- Moone Boy (2014)
- Trying Again (2014)
- Nurse (2015)
- Damned (2016)
- The Tuckers (2020)
- Hullraisers (2022)
- Stuck (5-part series, television 2022)
