= Pentecost (film) =

- Film poster
- Directed by: Peter McDonald
- Written by: Peter McDonald
- Story by: Peter McDonald
- Produced by: Eimear O'Kane
- Starring: Andrew Bennett; Scott Graham; Michael McElhatton; Don Wycherley
- Cinematography: Patrick Jordan
- Edited by: John O'Connor
- Music by: John McPhillips
- Production company: EMU Productions
- Release date: 4 December 2011 (Ireland)
- Running time: 11 minutes
- Country: Ireland
- Language: English

Pentecost is a 2011 Irish comedic live action short film directed by Peter McDonald. The film was nominated for the 2012 Academy Award for Best Live Action Short Film.

The film follows an eleven-year-old boy who is a last-minute call-in by his local parish to serve as an altar boy at an important mass.
