= Death of a Superhero =

2011 Irish drama film

- Directed by: Ian FitzGibbon
- Screenplay by: Anthony McCarten
- Based on: Death of a Superhero by Anthony McCarten
- Produced by: Astrid Kahmke; Philipp Kreuzer, Michael Garland
- Starring: Andy Serkis; Thomas Sangster; Aisling Loftus; Michael McElhatton; Sharon Horgan; Jessica Schwarz
- Cinematography: Tom Fährmann
- Edited by: Tony Cranstoun
- Music by: Marius Ruhland
- Production companies: Bavaria Pictures; Grand Pictures
- Distributed by: Element Pictures
- Release date: 10 September 2011 (TIFF)
- Running time: 97 minutes
- Country: Ireland
- Language: English
- Box office: $33,870

Death of a Superhero is a 2011 Irish drama film based on the New Zealand novel of the same name by Anthony McCarten. Originally planned to be directed by McCarten in New Zealand, the film was shot on location in Ireland throughout 2010 and was directed by Ian FitzGibbon. The film stars Thomas Sangster alongside Andy Serkis. It tells the story of a dying 15-year-old boy who draws comic book stories of an invincible superhero as he struggles with his mortality.

== Plot ==
Don, a 15-year-old with terminal cancer, attempts suicide by the train tracks, but ultimately lets the train rush past him. Don draws comic stories and has hallucinations. During a scan, he sees a twisted woman laughing at him.

In an effort to stop his suicide attempts, his parents send him to therapy. Eventually, he is sent to see psychiatrist Dr. Adrian King.

Don walks home from school and balances on the wall of a bridge as cars rush past below him. He cautiously walks across, unaware that he has been spotted by King.

Don shows his opinion on King's methods by painting a Skull 'n' Crossbones on the latter's boat. Don later cleans it off and King offers love advice for his crush Shelly.

Shelly "reads out" an essay from her book. Don realises that she has not done her homework and is improvising. While leaving the classroom, Don "compliments" her essay. She smiles.

At a party, Don and his friends "perfect" a recipe for a drink made from alcoholic wines and beers. Grinning, Don takes a sip. On the way home, he spots the woman again, and this inspires him. In the morning, there is graffitied woman on the school window. Don is suspended from school for a week. Eventually, he is made to scrub it off. While he is doing this, Shelly appears and helps him. Don returns to King and notices a picture of the latter's dead wife.

Don and Shelly eventually decide to attend a party on the weekend. Don asks King for 'love advice' and attends the party with Shelly. Before the party, Shelly reveals that she likes Don's drawings. Flattered, Don says that she is the smartest girl in the class and beautiful. Shelly does not think that that is a 'talent' and would do anything for one like Don's. The party goes well until they discover a video of Shelly exposing her breasts and lying on the floor and beginning to strip off her clothes. Someone jokes to Don about his girlfriend being 'dirty' and 'crazy'. Embarrassed, Don claims that she is not his girlfriend and that they hardly know each other. Shelly hears him and leaves on her motorbike without him.

Don arrives home, heartbroken, and is spotted by King, who asks what is wrong. Don tells him to go away and leaves shouting. He then has a panic attack and needs to be rushed to the hospital. Don is informed his cancer has got worse and has a few days left to live. His father decides to spend time with him smoking. When Don's mother finds out, she tells his father to drive him to hospital.

Don talks to a younger patient who has cancer too. She claims that she wants to be a dancer when she is older. Billy says that he will be a prince and Don reveals that he wants to be a superhero.

Don's brother confesses to Don's friend that he does not want Don to die a virgin. They go around the school asking girls if they will have sex with Don, but all of them say no. Eventually, they find girls who are willing. Don is embarrassed when they show him pictures of the girls and ask for him to pick one. With the help of King, they get one to agree.

Don is nervous while talking with the girl, and they stumble across the subject of 'true love'. She then asks Don to show her some of his pictures. The girl is impressed and says that she would do anything for a talent like his. He is reminded of Shelly. In a hallucination he sees a medic woman who tried to kill him with a kiss. He leaves the girl, goes to Shelly and apologises.

The two walk along a beach. Don makes her promise that if she is ever upset, she will visit the beach and think of him. Don eventually dies on his bed, in peace.

King boards his sailboat, on which he has painted a Skull 'n' Crossbones. Shelly, meanwhile, is on a rock by the waterside.

== Cast ==
- Andy Serkis as Dr. Adrian King
- Thomas Sangster as Donald Clarke
- Aisling Loftus as Shelly
- Michael McElhatton as James Clarke
- Sharon Horgan as Renata Clarke
- Jessica Schwarz as Tanya
- Ronan Raftery as Jeff
- Killian Coyle as Hugo
- Ben Harding as Michael
- Jane Brennan as Dr. Rebecca Johnston

== Production ==
Development of the project was announced in 2008, with it being reported that Anthony McCarten was to direct his adaptation of his own novel. McCarten hoped the film would be shot in New Zealand after receiving German funding and also considered the big names it could draw in. In February 2009, it was announced that Freddie Highmore was to join the cast as the central character and that filming was to begin later in the year. After the involvement of Grand Pictures and the Irish Film Board, the film's setting moved from New Zealand to Dublin, with Ian Fitzgibbon signing on as director. Highmore left the role and was replaced by Thomas Sangster, with Andy Serkis also signing on. The film was shot throughout 2010 in Ireland, with principal photography wrapping in December 2010. In October 2011, Tribeca Film purchased the North American distribution rights for the film during its world premiere at the Toronto Film Festival where it was an Official Selection. The film had a limited release beginning 4 May 2012 after its US premiere at the Tribeca Film Festival. Prior to this the film won the Audience Award and Young Jury Award at the 2011 European Film Festival.

== Reception ==
The film received positive reviews, with Variety praising the cast, specifically Sangster and Serkis. It won the People's Choice Award and the Young Jury Award at the 2011 Les Arcs Film Festival. The film has also won the Audience Award and 'Special Mention' of the Jury at the Mamer-en-Mars European Film Festival

It has appeared on the Irish Leaving Certificate Examination English syllabus.
