= The Protégé =

2021 American action film

- Theatrical release poster
- Directed by: Martin Campbell
- Written by: Richard Wenk
- Produced by: Arthur Sarkissian; Rob Van Norden; Yariv Lerner; Chris Milburn; Moshe Diamant
- Starring: Michael Keaton; Maggie Q; Samuel L. Jackson; Patrick Malahide; David Rintoul; Ori Pfeffer; Ray Fearon; Caroline Loncq; Robert Patrick
- Cinematography: David Tattersall
- Edited by: Angela M. Catanzaro
- Music by: Rupert Parkes
- Production companies: Millennium Media; Fourteen Films; I Road Productions; Campbell Grobman Films; Ingenious Media
- Distributed by: Lionsgate
- Release date: August 20, 2021
- Running time: 109 minutes
- Country: United States
- Language: English
- Box office: $8.7 million

The Protégé is a 2021 American action thriller film directed by Martin Campbell, written by Richard Wenk, and starring Maggie Q, Michael Keaton, Samuel L. Jackson, Patrick Malahide, David Rintoul, Ori Pfeffer, Ray Fearon, Caroline Loncq, and Robert Patrick. The film is about Anna, who was rescued as a child by the legendary assassin Moody, and is now the world's most skilled contract killer. When Moody is brutally killed, she vows revenge for the man who taught her everything she knows. The film was released on August 20, 2021, by Lionsgate. It received mixed reviews from critics and grossed $8 million at the box office.

== Plot ==
In 1991, international assassin Moody Dutton discovers a child named Anna in the aftermath of a gang massacre in Da Nang, Vietnam. Thirty years later, Moody has raised Anna as his apprentice and adopted daughter, while she runs a rare book shop in London as a cover.

Following a successful assassination in Romania, Anna returns home where an ill Moody shows her his headquarters under a barn next to the English manor where he lives. After celebrating Moody's 70th birthday Anna gives him a Flying V guitar owned by Albert King. He then asks her to track down a person of interest named Lucas Hayes. Anna enlists her contact Benny to investigate Lucas, and encounters the mysterious Michael Rembrandt at her bookstore. Soon after, Anna finds Moody, his housekeeper, and Benny murdered. She recovers files Moody hid from his killers, and survives a hit at her store, killing those sent to assassinate her.

The files indicate that Lucas's father Edward was a past target killed by Moody in Da Nang. Anna travels there and convinces old associate Billy Boy to help her confront Jossino Vohl, Edward's business partner who took over their company after Edward's death. She meets with Vohl and his lawyer, Duquet, but Duquet unexpectedly kills Vohl and takes Anna prisoner, demanding to know why she is seeking Hayes. During her captivity and torture, she is visited again by Rembrandt. It is revealed that Rembrandt and Duquet are rivals working for the same man. He tells her he was not involved in Moody's death or the shooting at her store, but she should drop her quest to find Lucas.

After the visit her captors try to hang Anna but she kills them, escapes and discovers that Lucas is severely disabled, cared for in a facility with a wealthy benefactor. Anna agrees to meet Rembrandt for dinner, where he urges her not to pursue his mysterious employer. After they part, Rembrandt survives a hit ordered by Duquet while Anna finds and kills Duquet at his apartment. She ambushes Rembrandt when he arrives but they give in to their mutual attraction and sleep together.

On the street, Anna is shot by Duquet's last henchman but is rescued by Moody, who faked his death by disguising his attempted killer as himself. They find out that Rembrandt's employer is holding a charity banquet at his heavily fortified mansion. Anna infiltrates that banquet disguised as a waiter but is stopped by Rembrandt. Moved to his secure bunker, the employer is confronted by Moody and is revealed to be Edward Hayes.

Edward hired Moody to perform the hit on him years ago, faking his death to hide him, his son, and his criminal empire. Moody tells Edward that he was only looking for Lucas to make amends for killing his father, and that Edward brought all this upon himself. He discusses how he may be a bad man but Hayes is truly evil, then detonates a bomb killing Edward and himself.

Badly wounded, Anna escapes to Da Nang to the place where Moody found her as a child. It is revealed that young Anna's family was attacked by a gang who forced her to watch them kill her parents and sisters. At the gang hideout, she watched the gang leader clean and assemble a pistol before assembling one herself and using it to kill the gang before being rescued by Moody.

Rembrandt arrives, and he and Anna hold each other at gunpoint. Two shots are heard. Anna exits the building, alone.

== Cast ==
- Michael Keaton as Michael Rembrandt
- Maggie Q as Anna Dutton
  - Eva Nguyen Thorsen as Young Anna Dutton
- Samuel L. Jackson as Moody Dutton
- Robert Patrick as Billy Boy
- David Rintoul as Edward Hayes
- Patrick Malahide as Vohl
- Ray Fearon as Duquet
- Ori Pfeffer as Athens
- Caroline Loncg as Claudia
- Florin Piersic Jr. as Ram
- Tudor Chirilă as Petru
- Velizar Binev as Don Preda
- George Piștereanu as Vali
- Gamba Cole as Benny
- Dimitar Nikolov as Lucas Hayes

== Production ==
In October 2017, it was announced that Gong Li had joined the cast of the film, then titled Ana, with Martin Campbell directing from a screenplay by Richard Wenk. In November 2019, it was announced Michael Keaton, Samuel L. Jackson and Maggie Q had joined the cast of the film.

Principal photography began in January 2020 under the title The Asset. Filming took place in Bucharest, London and Da Nang.

== Release ==
The film was released in theatres on August 20, 2021, by Lionsgate. It was previously scheduled to be released on April 23, 2021.

=== Box office ===
In the United States and Canada, The Protégé was released alongside Reminiscence, The Night House, and PAW Patrol: The Movie as well as the limited release of Flag Day and was projected to gross around $5 million from 2,577 theaters in its opening weekend. The film made $1.1 million on its first day, and went on to debut to just $2.9 million, finishing seventh at the box office. The film fell 44% in its second weekend to $1.6 million.

=== Critical response ===
Review aggregator website Rotten Tomatoes reports an approval rating of 64% based on 110 reviews, with an average rating of 5.9/10. The site's critical consensus reads: "Maggie Q's still waiting for the action movie that really deserves her -- but until then, The Protégé hits just hard enough to satisfy." On Metacritic, the film has a weighted average score of 48 out of 100 based on 27 critics, indicating "mixed or average reviews". Audiences polled by CinemaScore gave the film an average grade of "B" on an A+ to F scale, while PostTrak reported 76% of audience members gave it a positive score, with 50% saying they would definitely recommend it.
