= The Outlaws (2021 TV series) =

British television series

- Genre: Dark comedy; Crime drama; Thriller
- Created by: Elgin James; Stephen Merchant
- Starring: Rhianne Barreto; Darren Boyd; Gamba Cole; Jessica Gunning; Clare Perkins; Eleanor Tomlinson; Charles Babalola; Aiyana Goodfellow; Ian McElhinney; Gyuri Sarossy; Nina Wadia; Dolly Wells; Stephen Merchant; Christopher Walken; Claes Bang; Tom Hanson; Grace Calder; Kojo Kamara
- Music by: Dan Jones; Stew Jackson
- Country of origin: United Kingdom
- Original language: English
- No. of series: 3
- No. of episodes: 17

Production
- Executive producers: Stephen Merchant; Luke Alkin; Kenton Allen; Matthew Justice; Kate Daughton
- Producer: Nickie Sault
- Production companies: Big Talk Productions; Four Eyes Entertainment

Original release
- Network: Amazon Prime Video; BBC One
- Release: 25 October 2021 – 30 May 2024

The Outlaws is a British crime thriller comedy television series created by Elgin James and Stephen Merchant, and directed by Merchant and John Butler. It is shown on BBC One and iPlayer in the UK and Amazon Prime Video in the United States and some territories.

Filming of the first season was halted in March 2020 due to the COVID-19 pandemic. In January 2021, it was confirmed that a second series had been ordered, with production for the first series resuming in February 2021. It was later confirmed that both series had been filmed back to back. The first series premiered on 25 October 2021, and the second series premiered on 5 June 2022. The programme was renewed for a third series in March 2023, and premiered on 30 May 2024.

== Plot ==
The story follows seven strangers from different walks of life who are forced together to complete a Community Payback sentence, set in Bristol. However, their luck changes – not necessarily for the better – when they discover a bag full of money, unaware that its true owners are dangerous drug dealers and criminals.

== Cast and characters ==
=== Main ===
- Rhianne Barreto as Rani Rekowski, a straight-A student and serial shoplifter who struggles under the expectations and high standards of her strict and austere parents.
- Darren Boyd as John Halloran, a businessman and "right wing blow-hard" who struggles to impress his unloving father and keep his struggling business afloat.
- Gamba Cole as Ben Eastfield, a young nightclub security guard looking after his younger sister, who assumes the identity of Christian Taylor to carry out community service in his name.
- Jessica Gunning as Diane Pemberley, a former young offender, now acting as both a supervisor for community service, and later a PCSO, with an inflated sense of authority.
- Clare Perkins as Myrna Okeke, an activist and "left wing militant" who frequently clashes with John, whilst struggling with guilt over the death of a police officer for which she was responsible.
- Eleanor Tomlinson as Lady Gabriella "Gabby" Penrose-Howe, an out-of-touch socialite, reality TV star and social media influencer with anger management and substance abuse issues.
- Charles Babalola as Christian Taylor, the leader of the Brook Hill gang running the drug operation in Bristol for the Dean.
- Aiyana Goodfellow as Esme Eastfield, Ben's sister. (series 1; recurring series 2)
- Ian McElhinney as John Halloran Snr., John's father. (series 1–2; recurring series 3)
- Gyuri Sarossy as Jerzy Rekowski, Rani's father. (series 1–2)
- Nina Wadia as Shanthi Rekowski, Rani's mother. (series 1–2)
- Dolly Wells as Margaret, Frank's daughter. (series 1–2)
- Stephen Merchant as Greg Dillard, an unsuccessful and socially inept lawyer attempting to rebuild his love life following his divorce.
- Christopher Walken as Frank Sheldon, an American former conman living with his estranged daughter and grandchildren. (series 1–2; guest series 3)
- Claes Bang as Liam Matheson / The Dean, a London drug dealer overseeing the Brook Hill gang. (series 3; guest series 1; recurring series 2)
- Tom Hanson as Spencer Fitzwilliam, Greg's sleazy and mean-spirited colleague who bullies him. (series 1–2; recurring series 3)
- Grace Calder as DS Lucy Haines (series 2–3; recurring series 1)
- Kojo Kamara as DS Selforth (series 2–3; recurring series 1)

=== Recurring ===
- Rhys Yates as Smiler (s1-3)
- James Nelson-Joyce as Aiden "Spider" Haswell, a drug dealer who works for Christian (series 1)
- Guillermo Bedward as Tom, Frank's grandson (series 1–2)
- Isla Gie as Holly, Frank's granddaughter (series 1–2)
- Rufus Wright as DCI Monroe, Haines and Selforth's superior (Series 1-3)
- Sam Troughton as Mr Wilder, Diane's superior (series 1)
- Richard E. Grant as the Earl of Gloucestershire, Gabby's aristocratic absentee father (guest series 1; recurring series 3)
- Gerard Horan as Graham Hilgard (series 1 and 3)
- Marcus Fraser as Souljah, a drug dealer who works for Christian. (recurring series 1; guest series 2)
- Alexandria Riley as Yvonne, Myrna's sister (series 1)
- Julia Davis as Rita (series 2)

=== Guest ===
- Michael Cochrane as Mr Kingsley, Greg's boss. (series 2)
- Elizabeth Dulau as Lesley (series 2)

== Episodes ==
=== Series overview ===
Series
Series	Episodes	Originally released	
Series	Episodes	First released	Last released
1	6	25 October 2021	29 November 2021
2	6	5 June 2022	10 July 2022
3	5	30 May 2024	

=== Series 1 (2021) ===
No. overall	No. in series	Title	Directed by	Written by	Original release date	U.K. viewers (millions)
1	1	"Episode 1"	Stephen Merchant	Stephen Merchant and Elgin James	25 October 2021	3.11
2	2	"Episode 2"	Stephen Merchant	Stephen Merchant and Emma Jane Unsworth	1 November 2021	4.22
3	3	"Episode 3"	John Butler	Stephen Merchant and Nikita Lalwani	8 November 2021	3.43
4	4	"Episode 4"	John Butler	John Butler	15 November 2021	3.23
5	5	"Episode 5"	John Butler	Stephen Merchant	22 November 2021	3.23
6	6	"Episode 6"	Stephen Merchant	Stephen Merchant	29 November 2021	3.50

=== Series 2 (2022) ===
No. overall	No. in series	Title	Directed by	Written by	Original release date	U.K. viewers (millions)
7	1	"Episode 1"	John Butler	Stephen Merchant	5 June 2022	2.96
8	2	"Episode 2"	John Butler	Nathaniel Price	12 June 2022	2.63
9	3	"Episode 3"	Alicia MacDonald	Stephen Merchant and Nikita Lalwani	19 June 2022	2.35
10	4	"Episode 4"	Alicia MacDonald	Claire Downes	26 June 2022	2.29
11	5	"Episode 5"	Alicia MacDonald	John Butler	3 July 2022	2.13
12	6	"Episode 6"	Alicia MacDonald	Stephen Merchant	10 July 2022	2.33

=== Series 3 (2024) ===
No. overall	No. in series	Title	Directed by	Written by	Original release date
13	1	"Episode 1"	John Butler	John Butler	30 May 2024
14	2	"Episode 2"	John Butler	Nathaniel Price	30 May 2024
15	3	"Episode 3"	Curtis Vowell	Nikita Lalwani & Jess Bray	30 May 2024
16	4	"Episode 4"	Curtis Vowell	Nathaniel Price	30 May 2024
17	5	"Episode 5"	Curtis Vowell	Stephen Merchant & Jessica Gunning	30 May 2024

== Production ==
=== Development ===
The series is a co-production between BBC One and Amazon Studios. The series was commissioned by BBC Comedy and BBC One, and produced by Big Talk with Stephen Merchant's Four Eyes. The series is created by Merchant and Elgin James. Executive producers are Merchant for Four Eyes; and Luke Alkin, Kenton Allen, and Matthew Justice for Big Talk. Kate Daughton is the Commissioning Editor for the BBC, with the directors for the first series being Merchant and John Butler, and the producer is Nickie Sault. Originally announced with the working title The Offenders, the series was renamed during production, with the new title confirmed in September 2021. In January 2021, it was confirmed that a second series had been ordered. A third series was confirmed to be in production by the BBC in March 2023.

=== Filming ===
After some delays due to the COVID-19 pandemic, filming on location in Bristol began in February 2021, as well as at The Bottle Yard Studios in Whitchurch. The first and second series were filmed back-to-back. A small piece of Banksy's art was used on set.

In May 2023, production crew and cast were seen filming in the Bristol Harbour area, and in Clifton, Bristol, as well as the seafront at Weston-super-Mare for filming for the third series. Actress Eleanor Tomlinson confirmed in an interview on The One Show in November 2023 that filming on the third series had been completed.

== Broadcast ==
The series premiered on BBC One and BBC iPlayer in the UK on 25 October 2021; it was later released on Amazon Prime Video in the United States, Canada, Australia, New Zealand, and Nordic countries. The second series was released in full on BBC iPlayer on 5 June 2022. The third series was made available from 30 May 2024 on BBC iPlayer, and on 31 May 2024 on Amazon Prime Video.

== Accolades ==
On 9 January 2023, the show received a nomination at the Comedy.co.uk Awards 2022 in the Best Comedy Drama Series category. On 23 January 2023, Stephen Merchant received a nomination in the Outstanding Comedy Actor category at the National Comedy Awards 2023. The soundtrack composed by Stew Jackson and Dan Jones was nominated for the Best Television Soundtrack Ivor Novello Award.

== Banksy artwork destroyed ==
In season one's sixth episode, Frank, while cleaning a graffiti-covered wall as part of his Community Payback sentence, paints over an image of a stencilled rat sitting on two spray cans signed by Banksy. The BBC have confirmed that the artwork was an original piece created by Banksy for The Outlaws, and that it was genuinely destroyed by Walken when he painted over it.
