= Hugh O'Conor =

Irish actor, director, writer

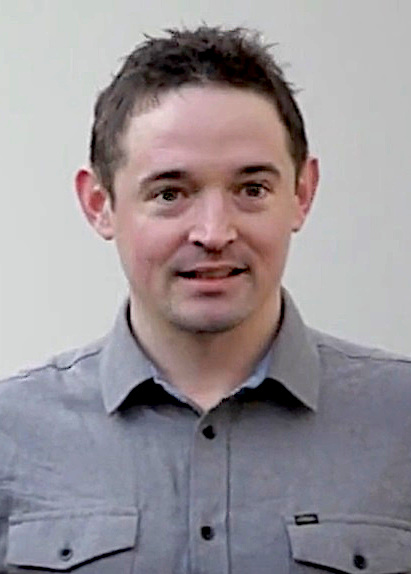
- O'Conor at JDIFF 2014
- Born: 19 April 1975 (age 51); Dublin, Ireland
- Occupations: Actor, director, writer
- Years active: 1985–present
- Website: hughoconor.com

Hugh O'Conor (born 19 April 1975) is an Irish actor, writer, director, and photographer. In 2020, he was listed as number 49 on The Irish Times list of Ireland's greatest film actors.

== Career ==
His first film appearance was opposite Liam Neeson in the 1985 movie Lamb.

He won a Young Artist Award in 1990 for his role in the Oscar-winning film My Left Foot, in which he portrayed the childhood days of Christy Brown, an Irishman born with cerebral palsy, who could control only his left foot. The film was nominated for five Oscars, including Best Picture, and won two: Daniel Day-Lewis for Best Actor and Brenda Fricker for Best Supporting Actress. In his acceptance speech, Day-Lewis said he "shared Christy's life with a remarkable young actor called Hugh O'Conor".

He starred in Benjamin Ross' The Young Poisoner's Handbook as murderer Graham Young, which won the Grand Jury Prize at the Sundance Film Festival in 1995.

He was nominated as part of the cast for Outstanding Performance by a Cast at the 2001 SAG-AFTRA awards for his performance as Pére Henri in Chocolat (2000). The film was nominated for five Oscars, including Best Picture. It was also nominated for eight BAFTAs and four Golden Globes, both including Best Picture.

In 2007, he was nominated for Best Actor at the Irish Film and Television Awards for his performance as James Van Der Bexton in Tony Herbert's Speed Dating (2006).

His short film Corduroy was selected for competition as part of the Generation 14Plus presentation at the 60th Berlinale in Berlin. It received the award for Best Fiction/Experimental Film at the 2010 Clones Film Festival.

In 2011, his music videos for I Draw Slow (Swans) and The Whileaways (Dear My Maker) were nominated for the Irish Music Video awards.

He was part of the creative and performing team for RTE's sketch comedy Your Bad Self (2010), along with Domhnall Gleeson and Amy Huberman; the show won Best Entertainment at the 2011 Irish Film and Television Awards.

His photograph Beckah, Dublin Airport was shortlisted and exhibited at the National Gallery of Ireland as part of the inaugural Hennessy Portrait Prize in 2014.

In 2014, he received the Best Supporting Actor award at the Irish Times Theatre Awards for his performance as the Fool in Selina Cartmell's production of King Lear at the Abbey Theatre in Dublin.

In 2018, his feature debut Metal Heart and animated short film The Overcoat premiered at the 2018 Galway Film Fleadh. Jordanne Jones won the Bingham Ray award for Best Newcomer. The Overcoat won Best Animated Sequence.

In 2018, he received the Jim Sheridan Award for Achievement in Irish Film at the Irish Screen America film festival in Los Angeles.

He received the Dublin Film Critics' Circle Maverick award at the 2019 Dublin International Film Festival. The Overcoat received a special mention.

He was nominated for the Independent Spirit award at the 2019 Santa Barbara International Film Festival for Metal Heart.

== Personal life ==
O'Conor was born on 19 April 1975 in Dublin, Ireland, and is the son of noted Irish pianist John O'Conor.

He studied drama at the Samuel Beckett Centre in Trinity College Dublin, and received a Fulbright scholarship to attend NYU Film School.

== Filmography ==
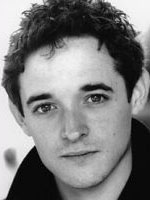
Hugh O'Conor in 2007

Film
Year	Title	Role	Notes
1985	Lamb	Owen Kane	
1986	Rawhead Rex	Robbie Hallenbeck	
1988	Da	Boy Charlie	
1989	My Left Foot	Young Christy Brown	
1993	Red Hot	Yuri	
1993	The Three Musketeers	King Louis	
1994	Words Upon the Window Pane	Cabin Boy	
1995	The Young Poisoner's Handbook	Graham Young	
1996	The Boy from Mercury	Paul	
1997	Sawdust Tales	Isaac	
2000	Hotel Splendide	Stanley Smith	
2000	Chocolat	Father Henri	
2002	Deathwatch	Anthony Bradford	
2003	Coney Island Baby	Satchmo	
2003	Il compagno americano	Muffa	
2003	Bloom	Stephen Dedalus	
2004	Blueberry	Young Mike Blueberry	AKA, Renegade
2005	The Unusual Inventions of Henry Cavendish	Mr. Henry Cavendish	Short film
2005	George		Short film
2007	Botched	Dmitry	
2007	Speed Dating	James Van Der Bexton	
2007	Waiting for Dublin	Twickers	
2008	Flick	Johnny 'Flick' Taylor	
2008	Summer of the Flying Saucer	Father Burke	
2008	A Film with Me in It	Detective	
2008	The Man Inside	Annoying Guy (voice)	Short film
2010	Miss Remarkable & her Career	Boyfriend (voice)	Short film
2010	Reuniting the Rubins	Yona Rubin	
2011	Killing Bono	Gary	
2013	The Stag	Fionnan	
2013	A Terrible Beauty	Lt. Arthur Dickson	
2015	Shem the Penman Sings Again	James Joyce	
2015	Pilgrimage	Brother Cathal	
2016	Handsome Devil	Dr. Eoin Mee	
2016	Property of the State	Fr. Joe Walsh	
2017	Mary Shelley	Samuel Taylor Coleridge	
2018	Sonja The White Swan	Winnie	
2019	Fritzi	Voice of Dad	

Television
Year	Title	Role	Notes
1984	The Irish R.M.	Jim Donovan	Episode: "Oweneen the Sprat"
1991	Perfect Scoundrels	Liam	Episode: "The Carpetbaggers"
1998	30 Years to Life	Vinnie Dawson	TV film
2002	Fergus's Wedding	Sex Shop Assistant	Episode: "1.3"
2005	Showbands	Karl	TV film
2006	Showbands II	Karl	TV film
2007	Northanger Abbey	James Morland	TV film
2008	10 Days to War	Magoo	Episode: "Our Business Is North"
2009	Psych Ward	Danny O'Hagan	Recurring role (4 episodes)
2009	Wild Decembers	The Crock	TV film
2010	Your Bad Self		6 episodes
2010	Lewis	Father Jasper	Episode: "The Dead of Winter"
2010	Three Wise Women	Tom	TV film
2011	Garrow's Law	Cathal Foley	Episode: "3.2"
2012	Saving the Titanic	Jonathan Shepherd	TV film
2012	Moone Boy	Elf	Episode: "Dark Side of the Moone"
2013	Ripper Street	Eagles	Episode:In My Protection
2013	A Terrible Beauty...	Lt. Arthur Dickson	TV film
2015	The Frankenstein Chronicles	James Hogg	
2016	The Fall	Dr. Lucas	Series 3
2019	Resistance	Dr. Laurence Moore	

=== Film and television as writer and director ===
Year	Title	Notes
2018	Metal Heart	Director, film
2010	Your Bad Self	Writer, TV series
2009	Corduroy	
2008	Spacemen Three	
2001	Guilty of Love	Also producer
