= Hazmat =

Hazmat, HazMat or HAZMAT may refer to:

- Dangerous goods, hazardous materials and items
- Hazmat suit
- Hazmat diving
- Hazmat (character), a Marvel Comics character
- HazMat (film), a 2013 horror film

== See also ==
- Hazmat Modine, a blues/indie folk/world fusion musical group from Dubai
