= Hazmat (film) =

HazMat
- DVD released by Uncork'd Entertainment
- Directed by: Lou Simon
- Written by: Lou Simon
- Produced by: Lou Simon
- Starring: Todd Bruno; Giordan Diaz; Gema Calero; Norbert Velez; Tom Stedham; Aniela McGuinness
- Cinematography: Anthony Dones
- Edited by: Michal Shipman
- Music by: Michael Damon
- Production company: White Lotus Productions
- Distributed by: Uncork'd Entertainment
- Release date: August 16, 2013 (Massachusetts Independent Film Festival)
- Running time: 80 minutes
- Country: United States
- Language: English

HazMat is a 2013 horror film written and directed by Lou Simon.

== Plot ==
Scary Antics, a struggling reality show about pranking people, finds its next "chump" in the form of Jacob, an awkward young man who is convinced that the abandoned chemical plant where his father died is haunted. Jacob was brought to the attention of the show by his friend Adam, who believes that pranking Jacob might scare him enough to make him move past his father's death, and his obsession with the plant.

Adam, his girlfriend Carla, and her friend Melanie are to take Jacob to the plant, and explore it with him as Gary the host of Scary Antics, and three members of the show's crew - David, Steven, and Brenda watch them through cameras while situated in a sealed office. Jacob finds and puts on an incomplete hazmat suit before an actor named Tim, who is wearing a full hazmat suit, jumps out to frighten him. Panicking, Jacob kills him with an old fire axe, and seemingly has a psychotic break due to realizing what he has done, and that he is the butt of an elaborate joke. Jacob dons Ed's mask, murders Adam and Carla, before chasing Melanie to the office, which he is unable to break into. Melanie and the others are trapped without sustenance, no way to contact help, and with no one knowing where they are due to the host going ahead with filming without informing the network, which required permits and documents that he could not afford.

After Jacob kills technician Ed when he stops by, Gary and Steven use their only map to locate the back exit, which Jacob locks after catching and murdering Steven, then chases Gary. After a brief hide and seek Gary almost exits the building when Jacob pulls him in and decapitates him. Brenda goes out and reclaims the map, but is followed back to the office by Jacob, who forces his way in before the door can be resealed. Jacob axes David while Melanie and Brenda make a run for it, trying to use the map to find another way out. Jacob finds the two, kills Melanie, and fights Brenda. During the struggle, Brenda pulls off Jacob's mask to reveal that his face and head have become disfigured and corpse-like, implying that he is possessed, and that the plant really is haunted. Brenda incapacitates Jacob, and reaches the other exit she and Melanie were looking for, but before she can escape the recovered Jacob pulls her back inside, and hacks her to pieces.

== Cast ==
- Norbert Velez as Jacob
- Aniela McGuinness as Brenda
- Todd Bruno as David
- Gema Calero as Melanie
- Giordan Diaz as Gary
- Tom Stedham as Steven
- Daniela Larez as Carla
- Reggie Peters as Adam
- Mario Nalini as Tim
- Dennis Spain as Ed

== Reception ==
The film was praised by Cinema Crazed's Felix Vasquez, Jr., who wrote, "Director Lou Simon’s HazMat is a fun and very gory hack and slash horror film that works around the low budget to deliver a genre entry slasher fanatics will lap up with a smile". Corey Danna of Horror News gave HazMat a 3½ out of 5, having deemed the climax underwhelming, but the rest of the film commendable, and ultimately concluding, "As a whole, HazMat, is the perfect film to watch with a group of friends". The same score was awarded by Jorge Larrea of 305 Magazine, who stated, "If you're a fan of old school horror movies like Friday the 13th, Nightmare on Elm Street, any of the Alfred Hitchcock films to name a few then you have to agree that horror films nowadays are not in the same league. Horror films lack that... cult feel to them, at least 90% of the ones released. That's where HazMat takes a step back into the cult realm. It has that feel. It's not the most frightening movie there is but you do feel the suspense and want to start screaming at the characters on the screen". The characterization, acting, and plot were called awkward by Michael Allen of 28 Days Later Analysis, who also said the conclusion was unsurprising, but nonetheless Allen admitted, "Overall, events onscreen are never boring, nor slowly paced. HazMat is an exciting film spent with a few interesting characters and a few grisly sights".
