= The Stag (film) =

- Directed by: John Butler
- Written by: John Butler; Peter McDonald
- Produced by: Rebecca O'Flanagan; Robert Walpole
- Starring: Andrew Scott; Hugh O'Conor; Peter McDonald; Brian Gleeson; Andrew Bennett; Michael Legge; Amy Huberman
- Cinematography: Peter Robertson
- Edited by: John O'Connor
- Music by: Stephen Rennicks
- Release dates: 10 September 2013 (Toronto); 7 March 2014
- Running time: 94 minutes
- Country: Ireland
- Language: English
- Budget: €600,000 (estimated)

The Stag (known as The Bachelor Weekend in some regions) is a 2013 Irish film directed by John Butler in his feature début and written by Butler and Peter McDonald.

== Plot ==
A stag weekend in the great outdoors in the west of Ireland takes some unexpected detours.

Arrow Films' synopsis of The Stag is as follows: "Self-confessed metrosexual Fionnán doesn't want a stag do, but would happily attend the Hen. Ruth, the now concerned bride-to-be (Amy Huberman), promptly persuades the, marginally more-macho, best man (Andrew Scott) to organise one. Reluctantly, he agrees but proceeds to do everything he can to stop Ruth's wildly infamous brother, known only as The Machine (Peter McDonald), coming along for their sober, walking-weekend, excuse for a stag party. But The Machine, not so easily fixed, tracks them down, and what follows is a hilarious few days in rural Ireland where the Stags find themselves lost, shot at, stoned and butt-naked. The Stag is a hilarious and heart-warming journey of friendship, fear, male bonding, and tightly fashioned squirrel skin!"

== Cast ==
- Andrew Scott as Davin
- Hugh O'Conor as Fionnán
- Peter McDonald as The Machine (Richard)
- Brian Gleeson as Simon
- Andrew Bennett as Enormous Kevin
- Michael Legge as Little Kevin
- Amy Huberman as Ruth

== Release ==
After being included in the line-up at the Toronto International Film Festival in September 2013, the film was released in Ireland on 7 March 2014 and 14 March in the UK. It received its US première at the 2014 Tribeca Film Festival in April. For the US release the film was retitled The Bachelor Weekend.

== Reception ==
On the review aggregator website Rotten Tomatoes, 79% of 29 critics' reviews are positive, with an average rating of 6.1/10. The website's consensus reads: "The Bachelor Weekend offers nothing new on the narrative front, but its strong ensemble cast and well-written gags more than compensate for any lack of originality." Metacritic, which uses a weighted average, assigned the film a score of 57 out of 100, based on six critics, indicating "mixed or average" reviews.

Mark Kermode gave the film 3/5 stars.

Ryan McNeil described it as 'an unexpected gem' with 'some of the most honest performances you're likely to see, and more brains, heart, and courage than any Hollywood comedy dare put forward.'

== Awards ==
The Stag has been nominated for Best Irish Film at the 11th Irish Film & Television Awards.
