= Eimear O'Kane =

Film producer

Eimear O'Kane is a film producer.

On January 24, 2012, she was nominated for an Academy Award for the short film Pentecost.
