= John Butler (director) =

Irish director, screenwriter and novelist

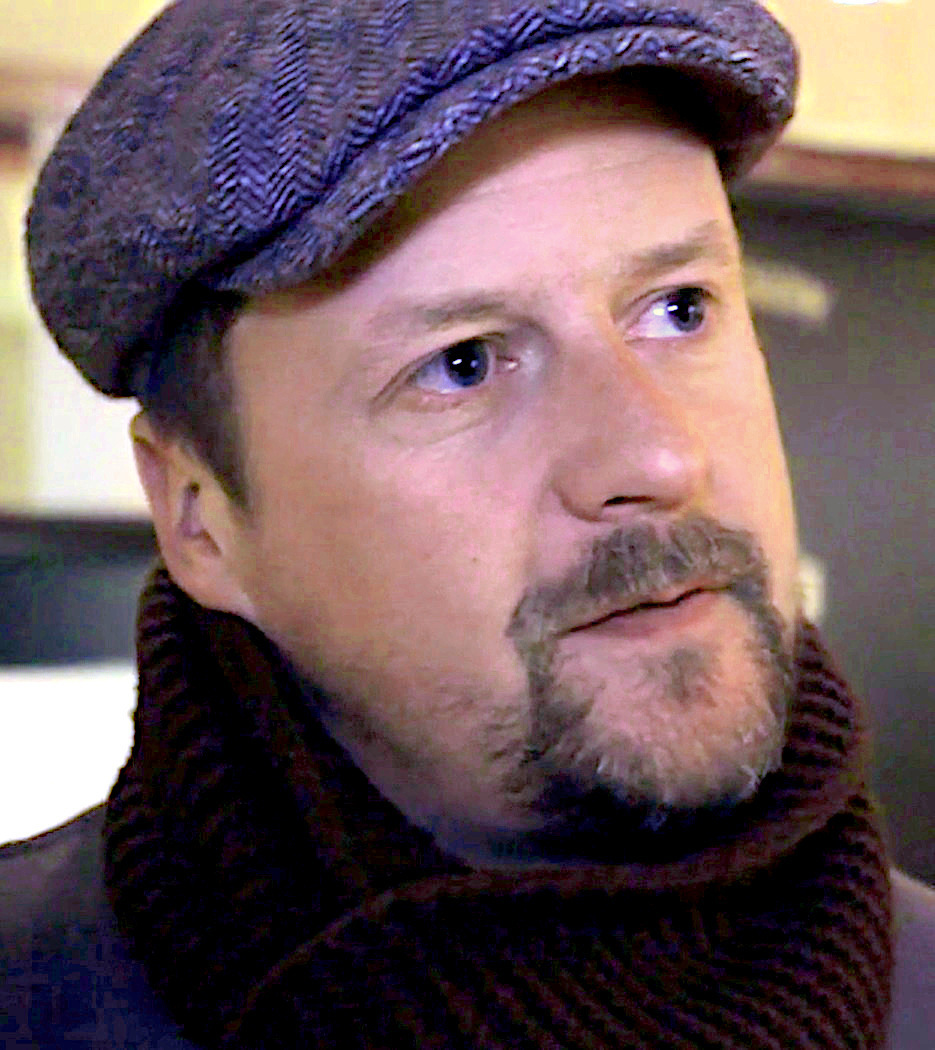
- Butler at JDIFF 2014
- Born: 4 July 1972 (age 54); Dublin, Ireland
- Occupations: Director, screenwriter, novelist

John Butler (born 4 July 1972) is an Irish director, screenwriter, and novelist. in 2011, Picador published his novel "The Tenderloin". His Television credits include the sketch show Your Bad Self, which won an IFTA for best entertainment show, plus writing and directing on The Outlaws (2021), which starred Stephen Merchant and Christopher Walken, and films directed are The Stag, Handsome Devil, and Papi Chulo. Other writing has appeared in The Irish Times, the Dublin Review and elsewhere.

== Early life ==
Butler was born 4 July 1972, in Dublin, Ireland. He attended Blackrock College, an all-boys Catholic school in Dublin. He then went to University College Dublin, obtaining a bachelor's degree in English Greek and Roman, and a master's degree in Film Studies.

== Career ==
in 2011, Picador published his novel "The Tenderloin". His TV work includes sketch show Your Bad Self (which won an IFTA for best entertainment show). His feature films are The Stag, about a group of former boarding schoolfriends on a stag weekend, and Handsome Devil (2016), which was featured at the Belfast Film Festival, and the Dublin International Film Festival. and Papi Chulo. Other writing has appeared in The Irish Times, the Dublin Review and elsewhere. In 2022, he wrote and directed an episode of BBC One's The Outlaws (2022), which starred Stephen Merchant, Eleanor Tomlinson and Christopher Walken.

== Personal life ==
Butler is gay. He is a supporter of Liverpool FC.

== Filmography ==
=== Films ===
==== As director ====
Title	Year	Notes	Ref.
George	2005	Short film; also writer	
The Ballad of Kid Kanturk	2009	Short film	
The Stag	2013	Also writer	
Handsome Devil	2016	Also writer	
Papi Chulo	2018	Also writer	

=== Television ===
==== As director ====
Title	Year	Notes	Ref.
The Million Dollar Deal	1999	Documentary	
Your Bad Self	2010	Director and Writer (6 episodes)	
Immaturity for Charity	2012	Television film	
The Outlaws	2021	Television series. Director (5 episodes) and writer (2 episodes)	
These Sacred Vows	2026	Television series. Director (6 episodes)and writer (6 episodes)	
