= John McPhillips =

Irish film music composer

- Born: Ireland
- Occupation: Irish composer
- Years active: 1995–present

John McPhillips is an Irish film music composer.

He won the Best Music Award in TV/Film for Spin the Bottle at the 1st Irish Film and Television Awards in 2003. He was the composer for the animated series Teenage Fairytale Dropouts, Hero: 108, the Oscar nominated short film Pentecost, and Handsome Devil. He composed the music for the 2014 Irish TV series "Trivia" currently accessible on Acorn TV.
