= Spin the Bottle (2003 film) =

- DVD cover
- Directed by: Ian Fitzgibbon
- Produced by: Michael Garland
- Starring: Michael McElhatton; Peter McDonald; Samantha Mumba; Bronagh Gallagher; Donal O'Kelly; Pat Leavy
- Edited by: Grainne Gavigan
- Music by: John McPhillips
- Distributed by: Irish Film Board
- Release date: November 28, 2003
- Running time: 84
- Country: Ireland
- Language: English

Spin the Bottle is a 2003 Irish film directed by Ian Fitzgibbon.

== Premise ==
The film is a story about a man named Rats who tries to form a band after being released from Mountjoy Prison to get money for a pilgrimage to Lourdes.

== Cast ==
- Michael McElhatton
- Peter McDonald
- Samantha Mumba
- Bronagh Gallagher
- Donal O'Kelly
- Pat Leavy

The film features a short appearance by pop singer Samantha Mumba, in what was her second film role.

== Awards and nominations ==
- 2003 IFTA Award nomination, Best Lead Actor – Film (Michael McElhatton)
- 2003 IFTA Award nomination, Best Script (Ian Fitzgibbon and Michael McElhatton)
