= List of Colin Farrell performances =

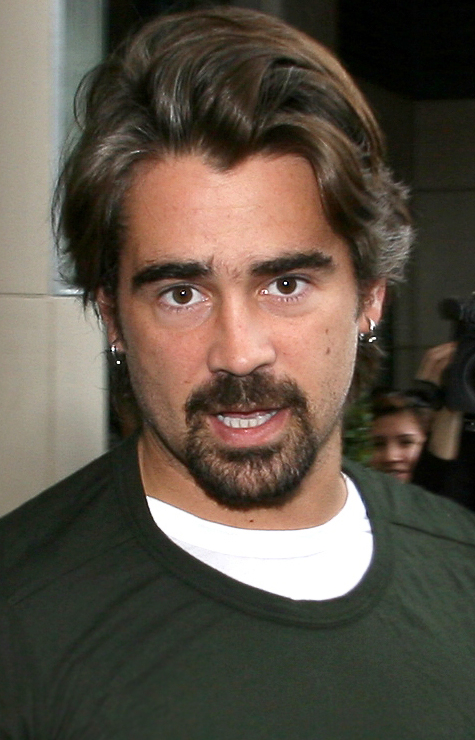
Farrell at the 2007 Toronto International Film Festival

Colin Farrell is an Irish actor. He began acting in the late 1990s, including a main role on the television series Ballykissangel. Following an uncredited appearance in The Disappearance of Finbar (1996), he earned his first credited role in The War Zone (1999). He earned positive reviews for his breakout performance in Tigerland (2000), leading to Hollywood roles such as Jesse James in American Outlaws (2001). Farrell succeeded that with a blockbuster breakout in Steven Spielberg's Minority Report (2002). That same year, he also starred in Phone Booth and Hart's War.

He continued to act in both Irish and American films, such as in Intermission and as the supervillainous Bullseye in Daredevil (both 2003), respectively. Other films that followed were A Home at the End of the World and as the titular character in Alexander (both 2004); The New World (2005), as Captain John Smith; as Detective James "Sonny" Crockett in the film remake of Miami Vice (2006); Cassandra's Dream (2007); and Pride and Glory (2008), among others.

Another 2008 film, In Bruges, would earn Farrell critical praise and several accolades, including his first Golden Globe win for Best Actor in a Motion Picture — Musical or Comedy. Subsequent films included Crazy Heart, Ondine, Triage, and The Imaginarium of Doctor Parnassus (all 2009); The Way Back (2010); Horrible Bosses and Fright Night (both 2011); Seven Psychopaths (2012); Saving Mr. Banks and Dead Man Down (both 2013); and Miss Julie (2014). He earned considerable acclaim for his work in The Lobster (2015) as well, receiving another Golden Globe nomination for Best Comedy Motion Picture Actor.

Farrell continued to keep busy throughout the decade, starring in such films as Fantastic Beasts and Where to Find Them (2016); The Killing of a Sacred Deer, The Beguiled remake, and Roman J. Israel, Esq. (all 2017); Widows (2018); and Dumbo (2019). In the 2020s, he has acted in such films as After Yang (2021); and as villain Oswald Cobblepot a.k.a. The Penguin in The Batman plus as real-life hero John Volanthen in Thirteen Lives (both 2022).

However, it was another 2022 film, The Banshees of Inisherin, which earned him the greatest reviews of his career to date. In addition, he earned several accolades, such as his second Golden Globe for Best Comedy Motion Picture Actor; the Volpi Cup for Best Actor at the 79th Venice International Film Festival; and his first nominations for an Academy Award and a BAFTA Film Award. He can next be seen in the upcoming films A Big Bold Beautiful Journey and Ballad of a Small Player (both released in 2025).

On television, Farrell has also thrived, starring in the second season of the anthology series True Detective; the neo-noir series Sugar; and the miniseries The Penguin, a spin-off from the film The Batman. For the latter project, Farrell earned his third Golden Globe Award for Best Actor in a Miniseries or TV Film plus his first SAG Award for Outstanding Performance by a Male Actor in a Miniseries or Television Movie, as well as a Primetime Emmy Award nomination for Outstanding Lead Actor in a Limited or Anthology Series or Movie.

== Film ==
Year	Title	Role	Notes	Ref.
1995	Frankie Starlight	Young Man in Cinema No.2		
1996	The Disappearance of Finbar	Simon	Uncredited	
1999	The War Zone	Nick		
2000	Ordinary Decent Criminal	Alec		
2000	Tigerland	Private Roland Bozz		
2001	American Outlaws	Jesse James		
2002	Hart's War	Lt. Thomas W. Hart		
2002	Minority Report	Agt. Danny Witwer		
2002	Phone Booth	Stu Shepard		
2003	The Recruit	James Douglas Clayton		
2003	Daredevil	Bullseye		
2003	Veronica Guerin	Tattooed Boy	Cameo	
2003	S.W.A.T.	Officer III Jim Street		
2003	Intermission	Lehiff		
2004	A Home at the End of the World	Bobby Morrow (1982)		
2004	Alexander	Alexander		
2005	The New World	Captain John Smith		
2006	Miami Vice	Detective James "Sonny" Crockett		
2006	Ask the Dust	Arturo Bandini		
2007	Cassandra's Dream	Terry Blaine		
2008	Kicking It	Narrator	Documentary; also executive producer	
2008	Pride and Glory	Sgt. Jimmy Egan		
2008	In Bruges	Ray		
2009	Ondine	Syracuse / Circus		
2009	Triage	Mark Walsh	Also executive producer	
2009	Crazy Heart	Tommy Sweet		
2009	The Imaginarium of Doctor Parnassus	Imaginarium Tony (3rd transformation)		
2010	The Way Back	Valka		
2010	London Boulevard	Harry Mitchel		
2011	Horrible Bosses	Bobby Pellitt		
2011	Fright Night	Jerry Dandrige		
2012	Total Recall	Douglas Quaid / Agent Carl Hauser		
2012	Seven Psychopaths	Marty Faranan		
2013	Dead Man Down	Victor / Laszlo Kerick		
2013	Epic	Ronin	Voice role	
2013	Saving Mr. Banks	Travers Robert Goff		
2014	Winter's Tale	Peter Lake		
2014	Miss Julie	John		
2015	The Lobster	David		
2015	Solace	Charles Ambrose		
2016	Fantastic Beasts and Where to Find Them	Percival Graves / Gellert Grindelwald		
2017	The Killing of a Sacred Deer	Steven Murphy		
2017	The Beguiled	John McBurney		
2017	Roman J. Israel, Esq.	George Pierce		
2018	Widows	Jack Mulligan		
2019	Dumbo	Holt Farrier		
2019	The Gentlemen	Coach		
2020	Artemis Fowl	Artemis Fowl I		
2020	Ava	Simon		
2021	Voyagers	Richard Alling		
2021	After Yang	Jake		
2022	The Batman	Oswald "Oz" Cobb / The Penguin		
2022	Thirteen Lives	John Volanthen		
2022	The Banshees of Inisherin	Pádraic Súilleabháin		
2025	Ballad of a Small Player	Lord Doyle		
2025	A Big Bold Beautiful Journey	David Longley		
2026	The Slightest Touch †	Himself	Documentary	
2028	The Batman: Part II †	Oswald "Oz" Cobb / The Penguin	Filming	

Key
†	Denotes films that have not yet been released

== Television ==
Year	Title	Role	Notes	Ref.
1998–1999	Ballykissangel	Danny Byrne	18 episodes	
1998	Falling for a Dancer	Daniel McCarthey	4 episodes	
2004	Saturday Night Live	Himself (host)	Episode: "Colin Farrell/Scissor Sisters"	
2005	Scrubs	Billy Callahan	Episode: "My Lucky Charm"	
2010	Sesame Street	Himself	Episode: "The Whoosh & Vanish Mystery"	
2015	True Detective	Detective Ray Velcoro	8 episodes	
2021	The North Water	Henry Drax	5 episodes	
2024–present	Sugar	John Sugar	16 episodes; also executive producer	
2024	The Penguin	Oswald "Oz" Cobb / The Penguin	Miniseries; also executive producer	

== Theatre ==
Year	Title	Role	Theatre	Ref.
1998	In a Little World of Our Own	Ray	Donmar Warehouse	

== Music video ==
Year	Title	Artist	Role	Notes	Ref.
2026	"Patient Zero"	Taylor Swift			

== See also ==
- List of awards and nominations received by Colin Farrell
