= List of awards and nominations received by Colin Farrell =

Colin Farrell awards and nominations
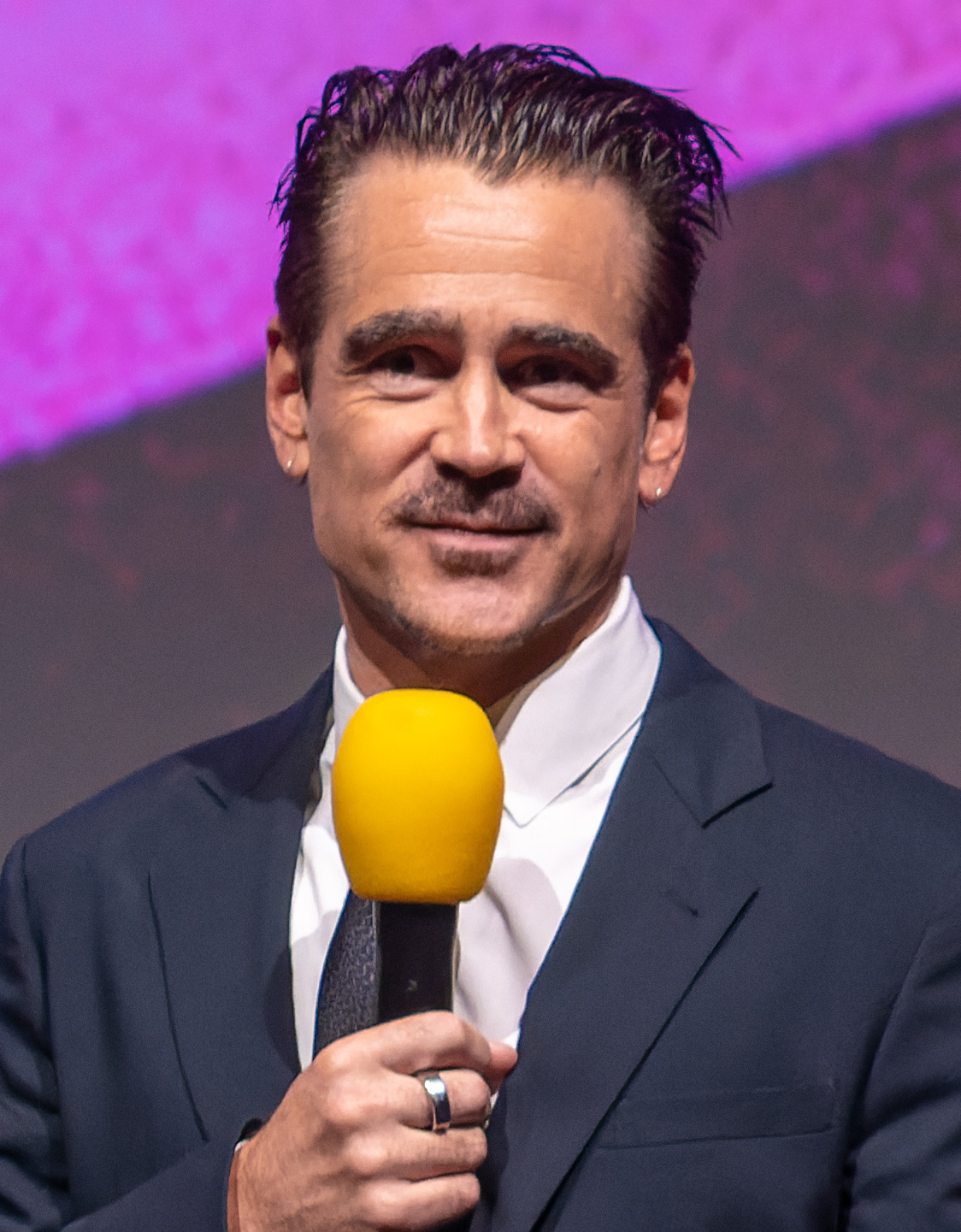
- Farrell at the 2022 BFI London Film Festival
Awards and nominations
Award	Wins	Nominations
Academy Awards	0	1
BAFTA Awards	0	1
Critics Choice Awards	1	4
Golden Globes	3	4
Primetime Emmy Awards	0	2
Screen Actors Guild Awards	1	3

Totals (Note: Certain award groups do not simply award one winner. They acknowledge several different recipients, have runners-up, and have third place. Since this is a specific recognition and is different from losing an award, runner-up mentions are considered wins in this award tally. For simplification and to avoid errors, each award in this list has been presumed to have had a prior nomination.)
- Wins: 56
- Nominations: 137

Irish actor Colin Farrell has received several accolades, including three Golden Globe Awards, a Critics Choice Award and a Screen Actors Guild Award, in addition to nominations for an Academy Award, a BAFTA Award and two Primetime Emmy Awards.

After playing minor roles in film and on television, Farrell's first leading role was in Joel Schumacher's war drama Tigerland (2000), for which he won the Boston Society of Film Critics Award for Best Actor. For his role as Bullseye in the superhero film Daredevil (2003), he won the Teen Choice Award for Choice Movie Villain and was nominated for the MTV Movie Award for Best Villain. Farrell won the Golden Globe Award for Best Actor in a Motion Picture – Musical or Comedy for his role as a novice hitman in the dark comedy thriller In Bruges (2008), his first film with frequent collaborator Martin McDonagh. Farrell received his second Golden Globe nomination for his role in Yorgos Lanthimos' absurdist comedy The Lobster (2015).

Farrell received praise for his role in Kogonada's science fiction film After Yang (2021), for which he was nominated for the Gotham Independent Film Award for Outstanding Lead Performance. For his leading role in McDonagh's tragicomedy The Banshees of Inisherin (2022), Farrell won several film critics' awards, as well as the Volpi Cup for Best Actor and his second Golden Globe Award. Farrell also earned his first nominations for the Academy Award, BAFTA Award, Critics Choice Award, and Screen Actors Guild Award for Best Actor.

Farrell played Oz Cobb / The Penguin in the superhero film The Batman (2022), and reprised his role in the HBO miniseries The Penguin (2024). For acting in and executive producing the latter, he received two Primetime Emmy Award nominations for Outstanding Lead Actor in a Limited or Anthology Series or Movie and Outstanding Limited or Anthology Series. He won a Critics Choice Award, a Golden Globe Award and a Screen Actors Guild Award for his performance.

== Awards and nominations ==
Awards and nominations received by Colin Farrell
Organisations	Year (Note: Indicates the year of ceremony)	Category	Nominated work	Result	Ref.
AACTA International Awards	2023	Best Actor	The Banshees of Inisherin	Nominated	
Academy Awards	2023	Best Actor	The Banshees of Inisherin	Nominated	
Alliance of Women Film Journalists	2022	Best Actor	The Banshees of Inisherin	Won	
Amanda Awards	2015	Best Actor	Miss Julie	Nominated	
Astra TV Awards	2024	Best Actor in a Streaming Drama Series	Sugar	Nominated	
Astra TV Awards	2025	Best Actor in a Limited Series or TV Movie	The Penguin	Won	
Austin Film Critics Association	2019	Best Ensemble	Widows	Won (Note: Shared with the cast)	
Austin Film Critics Association	2023	Best Actor	The Banshees of Inisherin	Won	
Austin Film Critics Association	2023	Best Ensemble	The Banshees of Inisherin	Nominated	
BAFTA Awards	2023	Best Actor in a Leading Role	The Banshees of Inisherin	Nominated	
Boston Society of Film Critics	2000	Best Actor	Tigerland	Won	
Boston Society of Film Critics	2012	Best Cast	Seven Psychopaths	Won	
Boston Society of Film Critics	2022	Best Actor	After Yang and The Banshees of Inisherin	Won	
British Independent Film Awards	2008	Best Actor	In Bruges	Nominated	
British Independent Film Awards	2015	Best Actor	The Lobster	Nominated	
Chicago Film Critics Association	2016	Best Actor	The Lobster	Nominated	
Chicago Film Critics Association	2022	Best Actor	The Banshees of Inisherin	Won	
Critics' Choice Awards	2019	Best Acting Ensemble	Widows	Nominated	
Critics' Choice Awards	2023	Best Acting Ensemble	The Banshees of Inisherin	Nominated	
Critics' Choice Awards	2023	Best Actor	The Banshees of Inisherin	Nominated	
Critics' Choice Awards	2025	Best Actor in a Movie/Miniseries	The Penguin	Won	
Critics' Choice Super Awards	2023	Best Actor in a Science Fiction/Fantasy Movie	After Yang	Nominated	
Critics' Choice Super Awards	2023	Best Actor in a Superhero Movie	The Batman	Won	
Critics' Choice Super Awards	2025	Best Actor in a Superhero Series, Limited Series or TV Movie	The Penguin	Won	
Critics' Choice Super Awards	2025	Best Villain in a Series, Limited Series or TV Movie	The Penguin	Won	
Critics' Choice Super Awards	2026	Best Actor in a Science Fiction/Fantasy Series	Sugar	Nominated	
Dallas–Fort Worth Film Critics Association	2022	Best Actor	The Banshees of Inisherin	Won	
Dorian Awards	2023	Film Performance of the Year	The Banshees of Inisherin	Nominated	
Dorian Awards	2025	Best TV Performance – Drama	The Penguin	Nominated	
Dublin Film Critics' Circle	2015	Best Actor	The Lobster	5th place (Note: Tied with Viggo Mortensen for Jauja and J. K. Simmons for Whiplash)	
Dublin Film Critics' Circle	2022	Best Actor	The Banshees of Inisherin	Won	
Empire Awards	2003	Best Actor	Minority Report	Nominated	
European Film Awards	2015	Best Actor	The Lobster	Nominated	
European Film Awards	2017	Best Actor	The Killing of a Sacred Deer	Nominated	
Evening Standard British Film Awards	2016	Comedy Award	The Lobster	Nominated	
Florida Film Critics Circle	2022	Best Actor	The Banshees of Inisherin	Won	
Florida Film Critics Circle	2022	Best Ensemble	The Banshees of Inisherin	Nominated	
Georgia Film Critics Association	2017	Best Actor	The Lobster	Nominated	
Georgia Film Critics Association	2019	Best Ensemble	Widows	Nominated	
Georgia Film Critics Association	2023	Best Actor	The Banshees of Inisherin	Won	
Georgia Film Critics Association	2023	Best Ensemble	The Banshees of Inisherin	Nominated	
Golden Globes	2009	Best Actor in a Motion Picture – Musical or Comedy	In Bruges	Won	
Golden Globes	2017	Best Actor in a Motion Picture – Musical or Comedy	The Lobster	Nominated	
Golden Globes	2023	Best Actor in a Motion Picture – Musical or Comedy	The Banshees of Inisherin	Won	
Golden Globes	2025	Best Actor in a Limited Series, Anthology Series or a Motion Picture Made for Television	The Penguin	Won	
Golden Raspberry Awards	2005	Worst Actor	Alexander	Nominated	
Golden Raspberry Awards	2023	Razzie Redeemer Award	The Banshees of Inisherin	Won	
Goldene Kamera	2017	Best International Actor	The Lobster	Won	
Gotham Awards	2022	Outstanding Lead Performance	After Yang	Nominated	
Hollywood Critics Association Midseason Awards	2022	Best Supporting Actor	The Batman	Nominated	
Hollywood Critics Association	2023	Best Actor	The Banshees of Inisherin	Nominated	
Houston Film Critics Society	2023	Best Actor	The Banshees of Inisherin	Won	
Houston Film Critics Society	2023	Best Ensemble Cast	The Banshees of Inisherin	Nominated	
IFTA Film & Drama Awards	2003	Best Lead Actor – Film	S.W.A.T	Nominated	
IFTA Film & Drama Awards	2003	Best Supporting Actor	Intermission	Nominated	
IFTA Film & Drama Awards	2003	Best Actor in a Film – Public Vote	—N/a	Won	
IFTA Film & Drama Awards	2004	Best Lead Actor – Film	A Home at the End of the World	Nominated	
IFTA Film & Drama Awards	2007	Best Lead Actor – Film	Miami Vice	Nominated	
IFTA Film & Drama Awards	2009	Best Lead Actor – Film	In Bruges	Nominated	
IFTA Film & Drama Awards	2010	Best Lead Actor – Film	Ondine	Won	
IFTA Film & Drama Awards	2011	Best Supporting Actor – Film	The Way Back	Nominated	
IFTA Film & Drama Awards	2013	Best Lead Actor – Film	Seven Psychopaths	Nominated	
IFTA Film & Drama Awards	2014	Best Supporting Actor – Film	Saving Mr. Banks	Nominated	
IFTA Film & Drama Awards	2015	Best Lead Actor – Film	Miss Julie	Nominated	
IFTA Film & Drama Awards	2016	Best Lead Actor – Film	The Lobster	Nominated	
IFTA Film & Drama Awards	2016	Best Lead Actor – TV Drama	True Detective	Nominated	
IFTA Film & Drama Awards	2017	Best Supporting Actor – Film	Fantastic Beasts and Where to Find Them	Nominated	
IFTA Film & Drama Awards	2018	Best Lead Actor – Film	The Killing of a Sacred Deer	Nominated	
IFTA Film & Drama Awards	2023	Best Lead Actor – Film	The Banshees of Inisherin	Nominated	
IFTA Film & Drama Awards	2023	Best Supporting Actor – Film	The Batman	Nominated	
IFTA Film & Drama Awards	2025	Best Lead Actor – TV Drama	The Penguin	Won	
IFTA Film & Drama Awards	2026	Best Lead Actor – Film	Ballad of a Small Player	Nominated	
IndieWire Critics Poll	2016	Best Actor	The Lobster	3rd place	
IndieWire Critics Poll	2022	Best Performance	The Banshees of Inisherin	Runner-up	
International Cinephile Society	2009	Best Actor	In Bruges	Nominated	
International Cinephile Society	2017	Best Actor	The Lobster	Nominated	
International Cinephile Society	2023	Best Actor	The Banshees of Inisherin	Nominated	
International Cinephile Society	2023	Best Ensemble	The Banshees of Inisherin	Nominated	
Las Vegas Film Critics Society	2018	Best Ensemble	Widows	Won	
Las Vegas Film Critics Society	2022	Best Actor	The Banshees of Inisherin	Nominated	
Las Vegas Film Critics Society	2022	Best Ensemble	The Banshees of Inisherin	Nominated	
London Film Critics' Circle	2002	British Newcomer of the Year	Tigerland	Won	
London Film Critics' Circle	2016	British/Irish Actor of the Year	The Lobster and Miss Julie	Nominated	
London Film Critics' Circle	2018	British/Irish Actor of the Year	The Killing of a Sacred Deer and The Beguiled	Nominated	
London Film Critics' Circle	2023	Actor of the Year	The Banshees of Inisherin	Won	
London Film Critics' Circle	2023	British/Irish Actor of the Year	After Yang, The Banshees of Inisherin, The Batman, and Thirteen Lives	Nominated	
Middleburg Film Festival	2025	Spotlight Actor Award	—N/a	Honoured	
MTV Movie Awards	2003	Best Trans-Atlantic Breakthrough Performer	Phone Booth	Won	
MTV Movie Awards	2003	Best Villain	Daredevil	Nominated	
MTV Movie Awards	2012	Best On-Screen Transformation	Horrible Bosses	Nominated	
MTV Movie Awards	2012	Best On-Screen Dirt Bag	Horrible Bosses	Nominated	
MTV Movie Awards	2022	Best Villain	The Batman	Nominated	
National Board of Review	2023	Best Actor	The Banshees of Inisherin	Won	
National Film Awards UK	2016	Best Actor	The Lobster	Nominated	
National Film Awards UK	2023	Best Actor	The Banshees of Inisherin	Nominated	
National Society of Film Critics	2023	Best Actor	After Yang and The Banshees of Inisherin	Won	
New York Film Critics Circle	2022	Best Actor	After Yang and The Banshees of Inisherin	Won	
New York Film Critics Online	2022	Best Actor	The Banshees of Inisherin	Won	
Online Film Critics Society	2023	Best Actor	The Banshees of Inisherin	Won	
Palm Springs International Film Festival	2023	Desert Palm Achievement Award, Actor	The Banshees of Inisherin	Won	
Primetime Emmy Awards	2025	Outstanding Limited or Anthology Series	The Penguin	Nominated (Note: Shared with Lauren LeFranc, Matt Reeves, Dylan Clark, Craig Zobel, Bill Carraro, Daniel Pipski, Vladimir Cvetko, Erika L. Johnson, Noelle Valdivia, John McCutcheon, Nick Towne, Corina Maritescu, Claudine Farrell, and Dana Robin)	
Primetime Emmy Awards	2025	Outstanding Lead Actor in a Limited or Anthology Series or Movie	The Penguin	Nominated	
San Diego Film Critics Society	2010	Best Actor	Ondine	Won	
San Diego Film Critics Society	2012	Best Ensemble	Seven Psychopaths	Nominated	
San Diego Film Critics Society	2023	Best Actor	The Banshees of Inisherin	Won	
San Diego Film Critics Society	2023	Best Ensemble	The Banshees of Inisherin	Runner-up	
San Diego Film Critics Society	2023	Special Award for Body of Work	After Yang, The Banshees of Inisherin, The Batman, and Thirteen Lives	Won	
San Francisco Bay Area Film Critics Circle	2023	Best Actor	The Banshees of Inisherin	Won	
Santa Barbara International Film Festival	2023	Cinema Vanguard Award	—N/a	Honoured (Note: Shared with Brendan Gleeson)	
Satellite Awards	2011	Best Supporting Actor – Motion Picture	Horrible Bosses	Nominated	
Satellite Awards	2022	Best Actor – Miniseries or Television Film	The North Water	Nominated	
Satellite Awards	2023	Best Actor in a Motion Picture – Comedy or Musical	The Banshees of Inisherin	Nominated	
Satellite Awards	2025	Best Actor – Miniseries or Television Film	The Penguin	Won	
Saturn Awards	2022	Best Supporting Actor	The Batman	Nominated	
Saturn Awards	2025	Best Actor in a Television Series	The Penguin	Won	
Screen Actors Guild Awards	2023	Outstanding Cast in a Motion Picture	The Banshees of Inisherin	Nominated	
Screen Actors Guild Awards	2023	Outstanding Male Actor in a Leading Role	The Banshees of Inisherin	Nominated	
Screen Actors Guild Awards	2025	Outstanding Male Actor in a Miniseries or Television Movie	The Penguin	Won	
Seattle Film Critics Society	2023	Best Actor in a Leading Role	The Banshees of Inisherin	Won	
Shanghai International Film Festival	2002	Golden Goblet Award for Best Actor	Hart's War	Won	
Society of Camera Operators	2023	Governors Award	—N/a	Honoured	
St. Louis Film Critics Association	2022	Best Actor	The Banshees of Inisherin	Nominated	
St. Louis Film Critics Association	2022	Best Ensemble	The Banshees of Inisherin	Nominated	
Teen Choice Awards	2003	Choice Movie Actor: Drama/Action Adventure	Phone Booth and Daredevil	Nominated	
Teen Choice Awards	2003	Choice Movie Villain	Daredevil	Won	
Teen Choice Awards	2003	Choice Movie Liar	Phone Booth	Nominated	
Teen Choice Awards	2003	Choice Breakout Male Movie Star	The Recruit, Daredevil and Phone Booth	Nominated	
Teen Choice Awards	2003	Choice Male Hottie	—N/a	Nominated	
Teen Choice Awards	2003	Choice Male Fashion Icon	—N/a	Nominated	
Toronto Film Critics Association	2023	Best Actor	The Banshees of Inisherin	Runner-up (Note: Tied with Brendan Fraser for The Whale)	
Vancouver Film Critics Circle	2023	Best Actor	The Banshees of Inisherin	Won	
Venice Film Festival	2022	Volpi Cup for Best Actor	The Banshees of Inisherin	Won	
Washington D.C. Area Film Critics Association	2018	Best Ensemble	Widows	Nominated	
Washington D.C. Area Film Critics Association	2022	Best Ensemble	The Banshees of Inisherin	Nominated	
Washington D.C. Area Film Critics Association	2022	Best Actor	The Banshees of Inisherin	Won	
Women Film Critics Circle	2022	Best Actor	The Banshees of Inisherin	Runner-up	
Zurich Film Festival	2025	Golden Icon Award	—N/a	Honoured	

== See also ==
- List of Colin Farrell performances
