= Tommy Farrell (footballer, born 1937) =

Irish footballer (1937–2012)

Personal information
- Full name: Thomas Farrell
- Date of birth: 1937
- Place of birth: Dublin, Ireland
- Date of death: 20 July 2012 (aged 74–75)

Youth career
- Home Farm

Senior career*
Years	Team	Apps	(Gls)
1957–1966	Shamrock Rovers		
1966	Waterford United		

International career
1960	Republic of Ireland B	1	(0)
- * Club domestic league appearances and goals

Thomas Farrell (/ˈfærəl/; Irish: Tomás Ó Fearail; 1937 – 20 July 2012) was an Irish footballer who played as a centre half. He began his career at Home Farm and signed for Shamrock Rovers in 1957. The actor Colin Farrell is his nephew.

He earned two League of Ireland XI caps while at Glenmalure Park and made seven appearances in the European Champion Clubs' Cup, UEFA Cup Winners' Cup and the Inter-Cities Fairs Cup against SK Rapid Wien and Valencia CF amongst others.

Farrell also made one appearance for the Republic of Ireland B in 1960 having already played for his country at schoolboy and youth level. He broke his nose while touring the US in the summer of 1961.

Farrell won his first FAI Cup medal in 1962 alongside his brother Eamon. He shared a benefit game with Tony Byrne in May 1965.

In December 1965 Farrell was suspended by Rovers for a breach of discipline. He signed for Waterford United in December 1966.
