= French hours =

Shooting a film without a set lunch break

"French hours" is a term used in the film and television industries, mainly in America, for when there is no break for lunch during a film shoot. Instead, food is passed around all day long and the crew works continuously. The lack of a lunch break means that crew members and the cast have to steal moments to eat. Joel Schumacher employed French hours when filming Phone Booth, a film completed in 10 days. Ridley Scott also used the approach when filming Robin Hood, noting that actors often had to eat on horseback between takes. Scott also agreed with the cast and crew that he would adhere strictly to a 10 hour shooting day due to lack of a traditional lunch break.

Ironically, in France outside of film-making, the opposite is the norm, whereby lunch usually lasts one to two hours. However, within the Paris studios up until the 1970s, the film-making day started at noon and continued to around 8pm, so everyone ate an early lunch before work began and did not eat until done working.

In accordance with union rules and the SAG contract, what traditionally takes place when French hours are instituted is that the cast and crew are remunerated in the form of "meal penalties". In the film and television industry, the cast and crew are required to be officially broken for lunch six hours after their initial call time. Meal penalties are monetary compensation that are incurred every half hour after the six-hour deadline until a meal break is given, or the shoot day ends. On a film like Phone Booth, it would not be unusual for the cast and crew to receive 20 or more meal penalties.

In parts of Canada and the United States, French hours are referred to as "Pacific North West Hours", or simply "PNW Hours" or "PNW".
