= Colin Farrell =

Irish actor (born 1976)

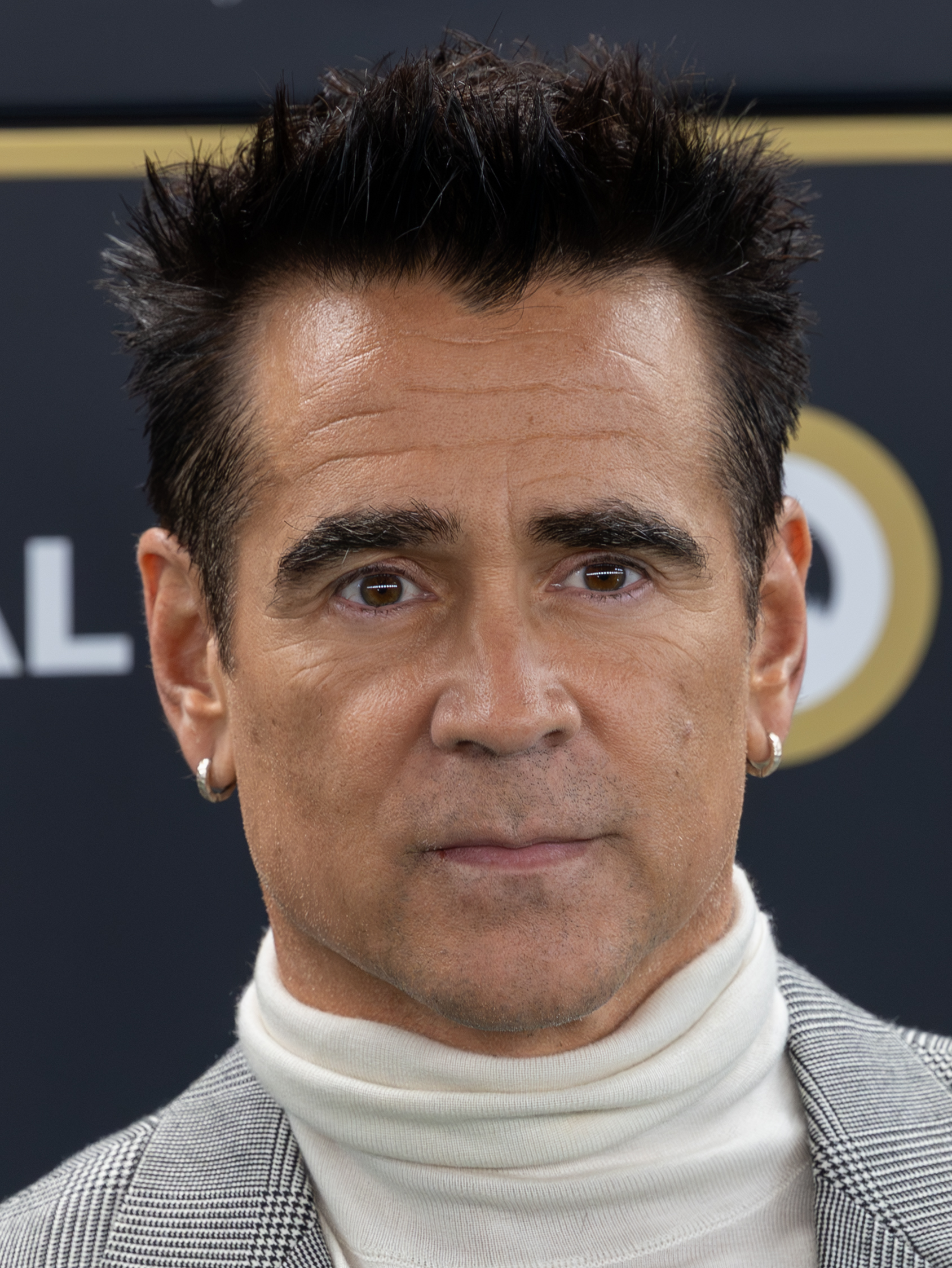
- Farrell in 2025
- Born: 31 May 1976 (age 50); Castleknock, County Dublin, Ireland
- Occupation: Actor
- Years active: 1994–present
- Works: Full list
- Children: 2
- Father: Eamon Farrell
- Relatives: Tommy Farrell (uncle)
- Awards: Full list

Colin James Farrell (/ˈfærəl/; born 31 May 1976) is an Irish actor. A leading man in blockbusters and independent films since the 2000s, he has received various accolades, including three Golden Globe Awards, one Actor Award, and one Volpi Cup in addition to nominations for an Academy Award, a BAFTA Award and two Primetime Emmy Awards.

Farrell began acting in the BBC drama series Ballykissangel (1998) and made his (first credited) film debut in the drama The War Zone (1999). His first lead film role was in the war drama Tigerland (2000), and he made his breakthrough in Steven Spielberg's science fiction film Minority Report (2002). He took on high-profile roles such as Bullseye in Daredevil (2003) and as Alexander the Great in Alexander (2004), with further starring roles in Phone Booth (2002), The Recruit (2003), S.W.A.T. (2003), and Miami Vice (2006).

Farrell earned acclaim for playing a novice hitman in his first film with frequent collaborator Martin McDonagh, the dark comedy In Bruges (2008), winning a Golden Globe Award. He went on to play a variety of leading and character roles in the comedy Horrible Bosses (2011), the science fiction film Total Recall (2012), the drama Saving Mr. Banks (2013), the dark comedies Seven Psychopaths (2012) and The Lobster (2015), the thrillers The Killing of a Sacred Deer (2017), The Beguiled (2017) and Widows (2018), and the fantasy films Fantastic Beasts and Where to Find Them (2016) and Dumbo (2019). He also starred in the second season of HBO's thriller series True Detective (2015).

In 2022, Farrell gained acclaim for his roles in the science fiction drama After Yang, the survival film Thirteen Lives, and McDonagh's drama The Banshees of Inisherin. For playing a naïve Irishman in the lattermost, he won the Volpi Cup for Best Actor and his second Golden Globe Award, in addition to nominations for the BAFTA and Academy Award for Best Actor. Farrell played Oz Cobb / Penguin in the superhero film The Batman (2022) and the HBO miniseries The Penguin (2024). For the latter, he was nominated for the Primetime Emmy Award for Outstanding Lead Actor in a Limited or Anthology Series or Movie, and won a Golden Globe Award and an Actor Award in the same category.

== Early life ==
Colin James Farrell was born in Castleknock, a western suburb of Dublin on 31 May 1976, to Rita (née Monaghan) and Eamon Farrell. His father played football for Shamrock Rovers FC and ran a health food shop. Farrell played for Castleknock Celtic FC, and the team was managed by his father. Farrell's uncle, Tommy Farrell, also played for Shamrock Rovers. Farrell has an older brother named Eamon, and two sisters, Catherine and Claudine (the latter now works as his personal assistant). Farrell grew up Catholic and went to St Brigid's National School, Castleknock, followed by the all-boys private school Castleknock College, and then Gormanston College in Gormanston Castle in County Meath. He unsuccessfully auditioned for the boy band Boyzone around that time.

Farrell was inspired to try acting when Henry Thomas's performance in E.T. the Extra-Terrestrial (1982) moved him to tears. With his brother's encouragement, he attended the Gaiety School of Acting, but dropped out when he was cast as Danny Byrne in the BBC drama Ballykissangel. While traveling in Sydney at the age of 18, Farrell became a suspect in an attempted murder case. The police sketch looked remarkably like him and he had even described blacking out during the night in question; his only alibi was that a friend journaled that the two had been taking MDMA on the other side of town that night.

== Career ==
=== 1998–2003: Early career and breakthrough ===
Farrell had roles in television shows and films, including Ballykissangel and Falling for a Dancer in 1998 and 1999. He made his feature film debut in English actor Tim Roth's directorial debut, The War Zone, a drama about child sexual abuse, starring Ray Winstone and Tilda Swinton as parents of a girl Farrell's character (Nick) dates. Farrell appeared in Ordinary Decent Criminal with Kevin Spacey and Linda Fiorentino, a film loosely based on the life of Martin Cahill. In 2000, Farrell was cast in the lead role of Private Roland Bozz in Tigerland, directed by Joel Schumacher. Farrell reportedly got the part on the basis of his charm. Emanuel Levy of Variety said that Farrell "shines as the subversive yet basically decent lad whose cynicism may be the only sane reaction to a situation". Michael Holden of The Guardian wrote that Farrell was "too much the hero" to fit the classic rebel archetype properly, but he still delivered a good performance. Tigerland earned $139,500.

Farrell's next American films, American Outlaws (2001) and Hart's War (2002), were not commercially successful. His 2002–2003 films, including Phone Booth, The Recruit and S.W.A.T. (all thrillers, with the former two his first starring roles), were well received by critics and successful at the box office. Of Phone Booth, Roger Ebert wrote that it is "Farrell's to win or lose, since he's onscreen most of the time, and he shows energy and intensity". Philip French of The Guardian praised Farrell's performance. In S.W.A.T., Farrell starred in an ensemble cast including Samuel L. Jackson, Michelle Rodriguez, Olivier Martinez and Jeremy Renner; Renner became a friend. Alan Morrison of Empire wrote, "Farrell can usually be relied upon to bring a spark to the bonfire. That's also true of [this movie]." Elvis Mitchell of the New York Times criticised Farrell's accent, writing that he "employ[ed] a wobbly American accent that makes him sound like an international criminal a step ahead of the authorities". Ebert and The New York Times' A.O. Scott disagreed on Farrell's effectiveness in The Recruit; Ebert noted Farrell's likability, but Scott felt that Farrell "spends his time in a caffeinated frenzy, trying to maintain his leading-man sang-froid while registering panic, stress and confusion". Phone Booth earned $46.6 million, S.W.A.T. $116.9 million and The Recruit $52.8 million at the box office.

Farrell's supporting roles include an ambitious Justice Department agent opposite Tom Cruise as a "potential criminal" in Minority Report (2002), and Bullseye, the villain in Daredevil (2003). Matt Damon was originally offered the Minority Report role, turning it down to appear in Ocean's Eleven. Farrell said "he had no problem" being the producer's fallback after Damon declined. Farrell was signed to the role in December 2001, although he was considered for the lead role of Matt Murdock (Daredevil) until Ben Affleck signed. Farrell was encouraged to keep his Irish accent, since this version of Bullseye is from Ireland. He read Frank Miller's Daredevil comics to understand Bullseye "because the expression on the character's faces in the comic books, and just the way they move sometimes, and the exaggerations of the character I'm playing... he's so over-the-top that you do draw from that. But it's not exactly a character you can do method acting for...you know, running around New York killing people with paper clips". In 2003, he was voted sixth World's "Sexiest Man" by Company magazine.

=== 2003–2008: Career progression ===
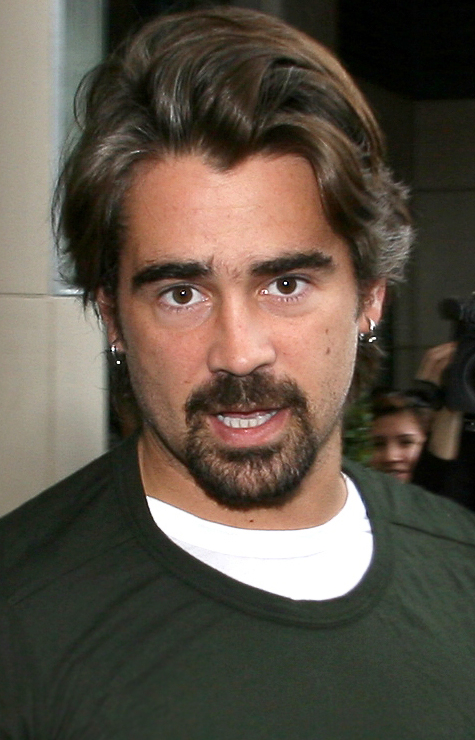
Farrell at the 2007 Toronto International Film Festival

In late 2003, Farrell starred as a criminal who plots a bank robbery with Cillian Murphy in the dark comedy Intermission, which held the record for highest-grossing Irish independent film in Irish box-office history for three years. In 2004, he appeared in several other independent films receiving limited theatrical release in most countries, including A Home at the End of the World (adapted from Michael Cunningham's novel of the same name). Roger Ebert praised Farrell, saying that he was "astonishing in the movie, not least because the character is such a departure from everything he has done before". Mick LaSalle of the San Francisco Chronicle differed, saying that Farrell "is keen on making good...The effort is there, but it's a performance you end up rooting for rather than enjoying, because there's no way to just relax and watch".

Farrell played the title role of Alexander the Great in Oliver Stone's 2004 biographical film Alexander, which, while receiving some favourable reviews internationally, was poorly received in the United States. Its portrayal of the conqueror as bisexual was controversial; the film was criticised by some historians for its treatment of the ancient Persians, although others praised it for its accuracy. An ancient history scholar at the University of Nebraska wrote:

I would compare [Alexander] to Lawrence of Arabia, in terms of sheer scope, pacing, and its unrelenting focus on a single individual... In many ways, this is a movie for Greek and Alexander 'geeks.' The more one knows, the more one will recognise—the historical accuracy of sets is better than I've seen in some documentaries.

The film grossed $167 million worldwide, just exceeding its budget of $155 million.

Farrell's next film was 2005's Academy Award-nominated The New World, his second historical epic. He played the lead role of Captain John Smith, the founder of 17th-century colonial Jamestown, Virginia who falls in love with the Native American princess Pocahontas (Q'Orianka Kilcher). Director Terrence Malick went out of his way to keep Farrell and Kilcher apart until they were filmed together. Although it was released in only 811 theatres worldwide and had a relatively low box-office gross, the film received a large number of positive reviews. In one of four reviews in The Guardian, John Patterson described it as a "bottomless movie, almost unspeakably beautiful and formally harmonious". The New World was followed by Ask the Dust, a period romance set in Los Angeles based on a John Fante novel and co-starring Salma Hayek. Reviews were mixed; Manohla Dargis of The New York Times favourably described Farrell's work, but Peter Bradshaw of The Guardian found "something a little forced in both lead performances". With a limited theatrical release, it was not a financial success.

Farrell was more successful in 2006 with his role opposite Jamie Foxx in Michael Mann's action crime drama, Miami Vice. The film grossed $164 million worldwide on a budget of $135 million, and TimeOut New York ranked it among the top 50 movies of the decade. The DVD, released the same year, also managed to sell over a million copies (equivalent to $7.91 million in pirated versions) in its first week alone, and, as of 11 February 2007, had grossed over $36.45 million in rentals. A. O. Scott criticised Farrell's work: "When he's not on screen, you don't miss him, and when he is, you find yourself, before long, looking at someone or something else." Conversely, Peter Travers of Rolling Stone was enthusiastic. Farrell also reportedly took a slight pay cut to make friend and recent Oscar winner Jamie Foxx happy; his salary was initially larger than Foxx's.

Farrell appeared in Woody Allen's drama Cassandra's Dream, which premiered in 2007 and was distributed in the US in early 2008. Mick LaSalle of the San Francisco Chronicle praised Farrell: "Allen is notorious for not giving his actors explicit instructions, and yet somehow this worked wonders for Farrell, who has never seemed so naked, so clear, and so unencumbered as he does here." Manohla Dargis concurred in the New York Times, adding that she thought Farrell was well-matched with co-star Ewan McGregor.

Farrell's next film, Martin McDonagh's first full-length feature, In Bruges, opened the 2008 Sundance Film Festival. While The New Yorker and TimeOut London's film critics found co-star Brendan Gleeson's performance the stronger of the two, Bradshaw of The Guardian found Farrell (as hitman Ray) to be "absolutely superb: moody and funny, lethally sexy, sometimes heartbreakingly sad and vulnerable like a little boy". Farrell won his first Golden Globe Award for his performance in the film.

Shortly thereafter, he appeared in Kicking It, a documentary following six homeless men from Kenya, Russia, Afghanistan, Ireland, Spain, and the US as they attempt to qualify for the Homeless World Cup. Farrell appeared on screen and provided the narration, donating his earnings to a homeless shelter in Ireland. The film was released simultaneously in theatres and on television, airing on ESPN2 in a very short window before its DVD release. Farrell received positive reviews for his involvement in the true story.

Later in 2008, Farrell starred opposite Edward Norton in Pride and Glory, a police drama directed by Gavin O'Connor. Roger Ebert disliked the film and A. O. Scott said that Farrell "once again indulges his blustery mixture of menace and charm, overdoing both," but Gregory Kirschling of Entertainment Weekly liked Farrell's work.

=== 2009–2021: Established actor ===
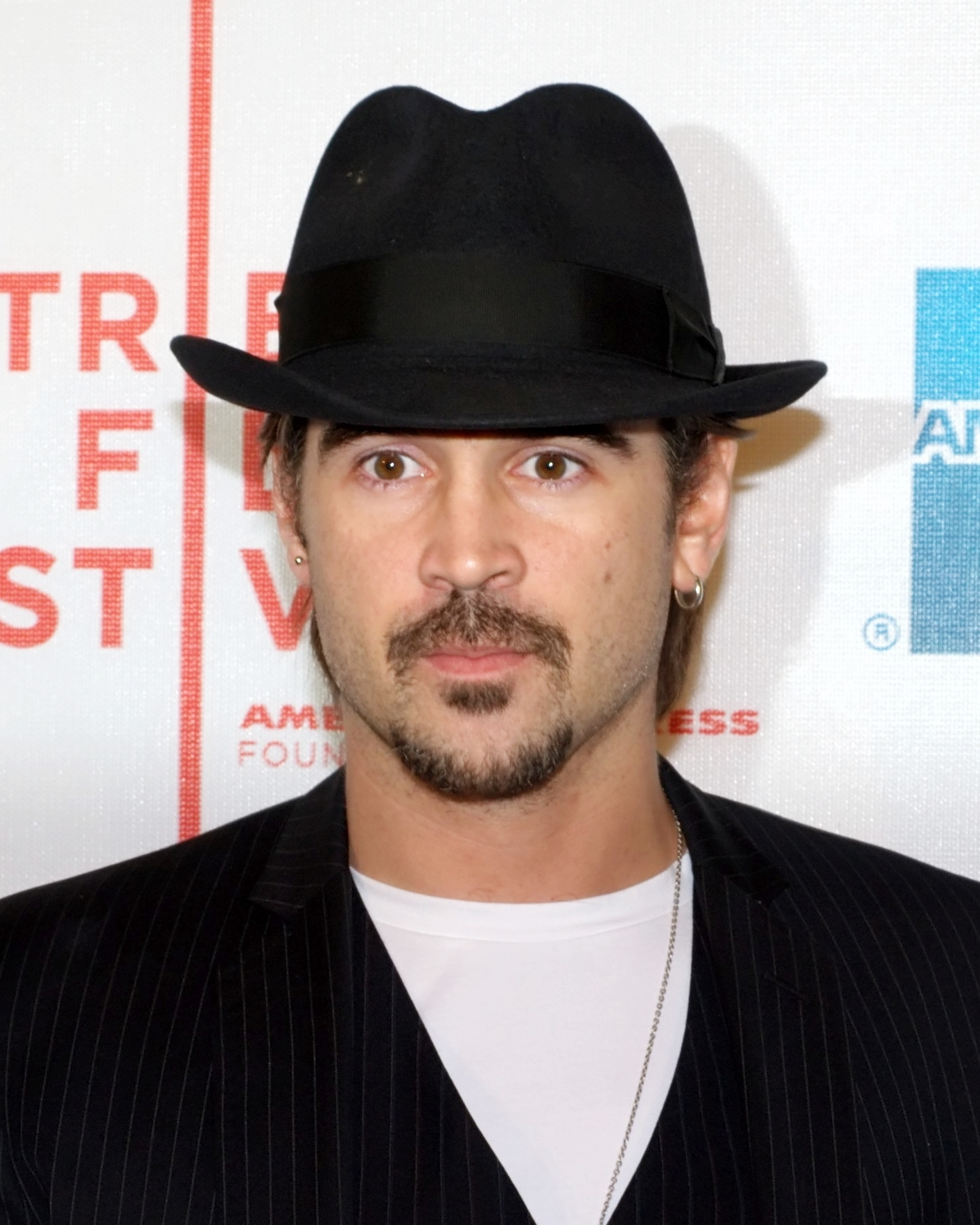
Farrell at the 2010 Tribeca Film Festival

On 11 January 2009, Farrell won the Golden Globe Award for Best Actor – Motion Picture Musical or Comedy for In Bruges, in which he co-starred with Brendan Gleeson. In the same year, he also appeared in Terry Gilliam's film The Imaginarium of Doctor Parnassus, starring Christopher Plummer and Andrew Garfield. Farrell was one of three actors (with Johnny Depp and Jude Law) who helped to complete Heath Ledger's role when Ledger died before filming ended. They played "Imaginarium" versions of Ledger's character Tony, donating their earnings to Ledger's daughter Matilda. Farrell also starred that year in Triage, directed by Oscar-winning Bosnian screenwriter and director Danis Tanović, about the life of a war correspondent. He lost 30 pounds for the role. Farrell's work was described as "dedicated" by Variety's Todd McCarthy, and Julian Sancton of Vanity Fair wrote that the film was "a hell of a lot more insightful than other movies that deal with a similar topic". However, Triage was not widely distributed due to the marketing challenges posed by its difficult topics (including PTSD). That year, Farrell played a supporting role (as Tommy Sweet) in Crazy Heart with Jeff Bridges.

Another 2009 release was Ondine, a fantasy-drama directed by Neil Jordan starring Farrell as a fisherman with a disabled daughter. Shot in the village of Castletownbere on Ireland's southwest coast, it featured cinematography by longtime Wong Kar-wai collaborator Christopher Doyle. Mary Pols of Time called the role "tailor-made for Farrell", saying that Farrell gave a "beautifully confident performance". Todd McCarthy of Variety singled Farrell out, noting that he worked well as an ensemble actor "graciously allowing [child star Alison Barry] to steal every scene she's in".

The next year, Farrell starred with Keira Knightley in the crime romance London Boulevard. The film, American William Monahan's debut as director after writing screenplays for The Departed and Body of Lies, was panned by critics. Peter Bradshaw of the Guardian wrote that the film "uses up all its energy, wit and ideas in the first 20 or so minutes, before collapsing into a flurry of boring violence". Leslie Felperin of Variety described it as "like a fancy, retro-styled pocket watch that someone accidentally broke and tried to reassemble with only a vague idea of clockwork". Felperin thought the stars' work was frail, with Farrell "mostly taciturn and vacuous." He also played the role of Valka in the survival film The Way Back in 2010.

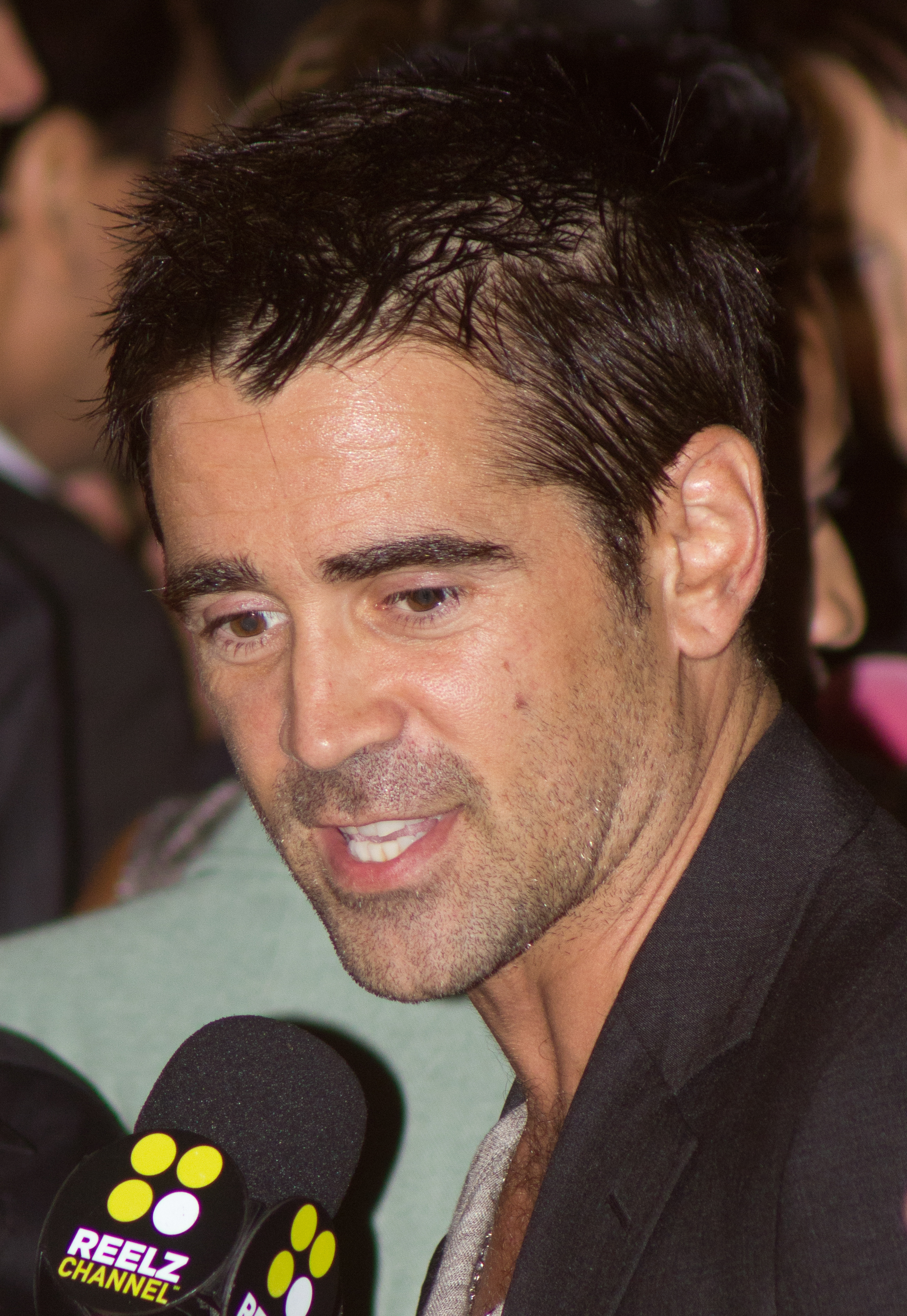
Farrell at the 2012 Toronto International Film Festival

Farrell starred in the 2011 comedy Horrible Bosses, directed by Seth Gordon with Jennifer Aniston, Jason Bateman, Charlie Day, Jason Sudeikis, Kevin Spacey, and his Miami Vice co-star Jamie Foxx also in the cast. The film focuses on a trio of employees who plot to murder their tyrannical bosses. The Guardian's Mark Kermode wrote that although the film would have benefited from a tighter script, Farrell and Foxx had juicy roles which they "riff with panache". Michael Phillips of the Los Angeles Times wrote that Farrell brought "massive, slobby relish" to his role as Sudeikis' cocaine-fiend boss.

Later that year, Farrell played the main antagonist in the Fright Night remake, joining Anton Yelchin, David Tennant and Toni Collette in the story of a charismatic vampire who moves next door to a high-school student and his single mother. The film was released by DreamWorks, with Craig Gillespie (of Lars and the Real Girl) directing a script by Buffy the Vampire Slayer writer Marti Noxon. Sukhdev Sandhu of The Daily Telegraph wrote that Farrell "proves his comedy credentials once more....utterly seductive as the plushly eyebrowed carpenter-cum-bloodsucker", while The New York Times' A.O. Scott thought that Farrell played his role with "a wink and a snarl and a feline purr". Logan Hill of New York magazine, on the other hand, was confused by Farrell's performance: "Sure, [it] may not make much sense, but neither do centuries-old vampires living in Nevadan subdivisions. So he goes for it."

Farrell starred with Kate Beckinsale in Columbia Pictures' Total Recall, a 2012 remake of the 1990 film, playing the role originally played by Arnold Schwarzenegger. It was filmed from May to September 2011 in Toronto and directed by Len Wiseman. Co-star Jessica Biel appreciated Farrell's skills, calling him "surprising and exciting. He just has the ability to be trying different things all the time." Roger Ebert and The New York Times said that although they believed Farrell the better actor, Schwarzenegger in the original was "more of a movie presence and better suited for the role".

Farrell's second film with Martin McDonagh, Seven Psychopaths, premiered at the Toronto International Film Festival and was released in October 2012. He starred as creatively blocked writer Marty in a black comedy with Sam Rockwell, Woody Harrelson, and Christopher Walken. The film broke even at the box office, with generally good reviews, including David Rooney of The Hollywood Reporter writing that Farrell "serves as an excellent foil for Rockwell" and he "is in subdued mode... his performance largely defined by the endless expressivity of his eyebrows." That month, Farrell appeared on the cover of the magazine Details.

In March 2013, Farrell starred in Dead Man Down, a thriller directed by Niels Arden Oplev, appearing alongside Terrence Howard for the first time since Hart's War 10 years earlier. Noomi Rapace, star of Oplev's The Girl with a Dragon Tattoo, starred as a facially scarred woman who blackmails Farrell's character into killing the man who disfigured her in a car crash. Reviews were mixed, with Empire magazine calling the film "a pleasingly intricate double (or is it triple?) revenge plot anchored by excellent acting" and The Hollywood Reporter saying that "[J.H.] Wyman's script and the measured pace don't lend themselves to the necessary escalating tension that would have resulted in a more rewarding climax." The New York Times' Manohla Dargis called the film a failure, but said of Farrell that "his sensitive, hardworking eyebrows help keep it from becoming a full-bore lampoon." Joe Neumaier of the New York Daily News also disliked the film, writing that it contained "a lot to roll your eyes over" and that Farrell was "as stoic as a statue".

In 2014, Farrell starred in a film adaptation of Mark Helprin's Winter's Tale. The film was written and directed by Akiva Goldsman and based on Helprin's 1983 novel, and co-starred Jessica Brown Findlay, Jennifer Connelly, Russell Crowe, and Will Smith. Farrell won the lead role over younger actors Garrett Hedlund, Tom Hiddleston and Aaron Taylor-Johnson. Although the film generally received negative reviews, writers such as The Village Voice's Stephanie Zacharek had nothing but praise for Farrell. She described him as "an extraordinary appealing actor" who "has always made a terrific bad boy, but ... seems to be settling into some very serious, responsible-adult roles." Mick LaSalle of the San Francisco Chronicle agreed, writing that Farrell "holds the movie together" and is part of "the most beautiful [love scene] so far of 2014."

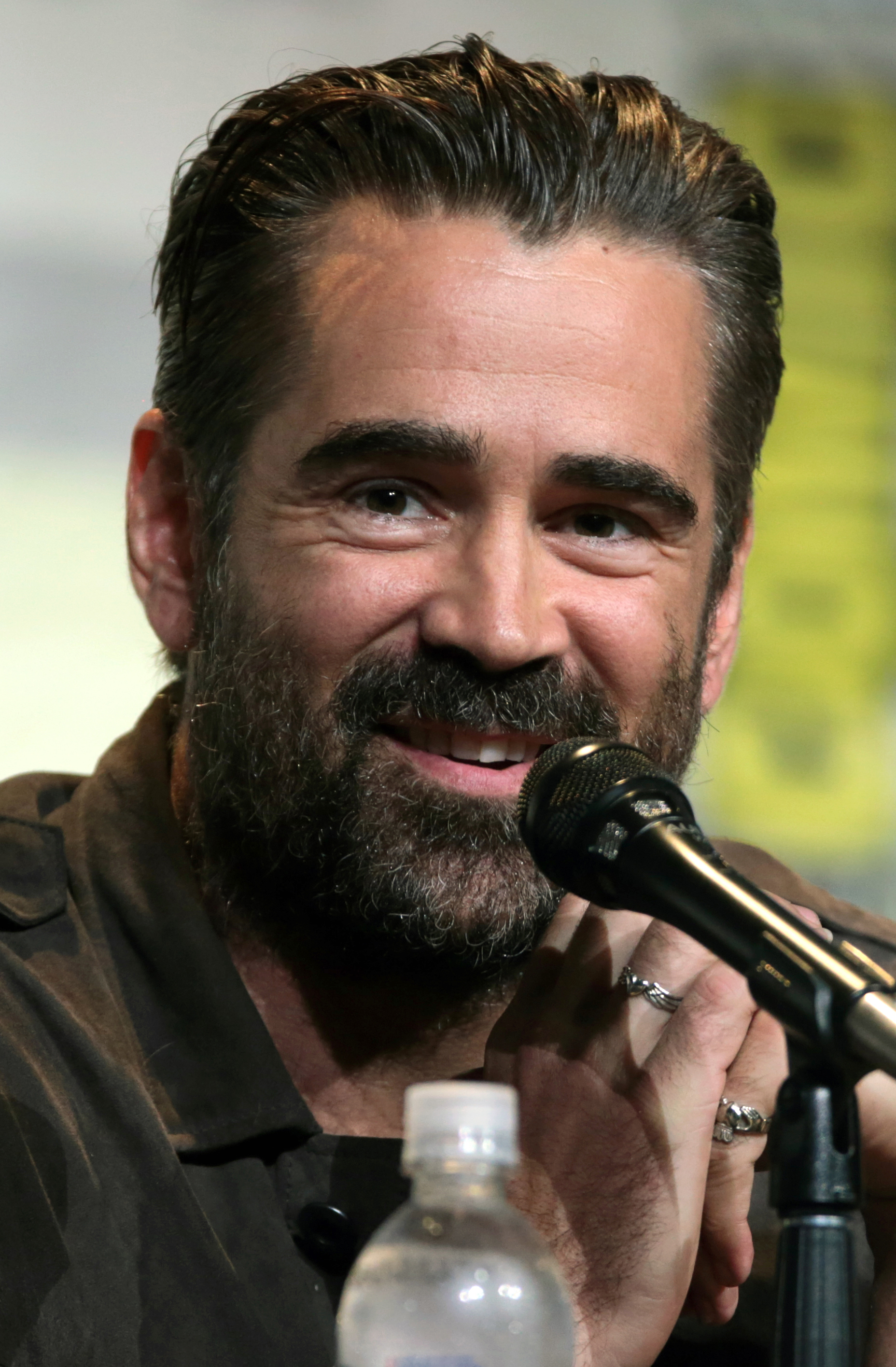
Farrell at the 2016 San Diego Comic Con

His role as P. L. Travers' alcoholic father in Saving Mr. Banks received contrasting reviews, with Scott Foundras of Variety calling it "excellent" and Leslie Felperin of The Hollywood Reporter deeming it "his best work in some time"; conversely, Peter Bradshaw of The Guardian described his performance as "bland" and "uninspired", while Robbie Collin of The Daily Telegraph found Farrell miscast in the role.

Farrell starred in Liv Ullmann's adaptation of August Strindberg's Miss Julie opposite Jessica Chastain and Samantha Morton. His turn as John, the serving man to Chastain's character's father, was described by Stephen Holden of The New York Times as the "strongest" of the three performances, though Ullmann's direction was deemed too flat by most reviewers. Farrell starred in the second season of the TV series True Detective as Ray Velcoro, alongside Vince Vaughn, Taylor Kitsch, and Rachel McAdams. The first two episodes were directed by Justin Lin. He worked with a dialect coach to adopt a nonstandard Californian accent for his character, which he found challenging.

Farrell starred in The Lobster, a romantic science fiction thriller which was released in 2015 and directed by Greek director Yorgos Lanthimos in his English-language debut. Its script was awarded the ARTE International Prize for Best CineMart 2013 Project at the 42nd Rotterdam International Film Festival. Set in a dystopian near-future in which finding a partner is a matter of life and death, the film tells an unconventional love story. The film also stars Rachel Weisz, Ben Whishaw, Olivia Colman, Léa Seydoux, and John C. Reilly. Farrell received his second Golden Globe nomination for his performance.

In 2016, Farrell starred in the Harry Potter spin-off film Fantastic Beasts and Where to Find Them; a traced version of a licensed promotional photo of Farrell from the film was subsequently used for the character Nefarian Serpine on the tenth anniversary cover of 2007's Skulduggery Pleasant, the first book in the series of the same name. In 2017, he had leading roles in the films The Beguiled, The Killing of a Sacred Deer, and Roman J. Israel, Esq. In 2018, he co-starred in Steve McQueen's thriller Widows, and then starred in Tim Burton's 2019 live-action fantasy Dumbo.

The Irish Times named him Ireland's fifth-greatest film actor in 2020, and Time magazine named him one of the 100 most influential people in the world in 2023.

=== 2022–present ===
In 2022, Farrell co-starred in the film Thirteen Lives, which chronicles the 2018 Tham Luang cave rescue of a Thai boys' soccer team that was trapped 2.5 miles inside the cave for eighteen days as a result of a flash-flood. The British cave divers Rick Stanton and John Volanthen participated in the rescue operation and retrieved the boys. During this production, Farrell and the other cast members did their own stunts and diving. In an interview about the film, Farrell admitted to suffering significant anxiety from the underwater work. He portrayed Oswald "Oz" Cobb / Penguin in Matt Reeves' 2022 film The Batman. He continued to portray the character in a spin-off solo series The Penguin on HBO in 2024 with his performance earning critical praise and the Golden Globe Award for Best Actor – Miniseries or Television Film. Farrell will reprise the role in The Batman Part II.

Also in 2022, Farrell reunited with Martin McDonagh and Brendan Gleeson for The Banshees of Inisherin, which earned Farrell a Volpi Cup for Best Actor from the 79th Venice Film Festival and a Golden Globe, as well as a nomination for the Academy Award for Best Actor.

In 2024, he starred in the Apple TV+ detective drama series Sugar, playing a private investigator hired by a Hollywood titan to investigate the disappearance of his beloved granddaughter. The series received positive reviews and was renewed for a second season, which was released in June 2026.

In March 2025, it was announced that Farrell was in talks to star in a film based on Sgt. Rock for Warner Bros. and DC Studios as part of their DC Universe franchise. The film is being directed by Luca Guadagnino and written by Justin Kuritzkes. In late 2025, he starred alongside Margot Robbie in Kogonada's film A Big Bold Beautiful Journey and Tilda Swinton in Edward Berger's Ballad of a Small Player. That November, he was cast in the action-thriller film Ordained as Father Roy Craig, a priest who performs last rites on a mob boss and is subsequently hunted down by the mafia to silence him for his knowledge.

In May 2026, he was cast alongside Ralph Fiennes and Wagner Moura in an English-language adaptation of Yasmina Reza’s 1994 play Art, directed by Fernando Meirelles.

== Charity work ==
In 2007, Farrell joined other celebrities as a spokesperson for the Special Olympics World Games in Shanghai. He also lent his support to the anti-bullying campaign Stand Up! organised by the Irish LGBT youth organisation BeLonG To in March 2012. Farrell, whose brother, Eamonn, is gay, had appeared on The Ellen DeGeneres Show two years earlier to increase awareness of the subject.

In 2015, Farrell became an official Ambassador of the Homeless World Cup, which uses street football to inspire homeless people to change their lives. In August 2024, he announced the launch of the Colin Farrell Foundation in dedication to his son James, who has Angelman syndrome. The organization provides support to adults with intellectual disabilities and their families. "This is the first time I've spoken about it," he said, "and obviously the only reason I'm speaking is I can't ask James if he wants to do this."

In 2011, Farrell befriended Irish activist Emma Fogarty, and has supported her campaign for people with epidermolysis bullosa. The story of their friendship, including their charity run in the 2024 Dublin Marathon, is the subject of the 2026 documentary, The Slightest Touch.

== Personal life ==
Farrell owns residences in Dublin, Ireland and Los Angeles, California. In 2013, he revealed that he suffers from insomnia and has suffered from occasional bouts of depression and dark thoughts.

=== Relationships and children ===
Farrell met English actress and singer Amelia Warner at the premiere of Quills in 2000. They dated from July to November 2001. There was unproven speculation that they married. Farrell said of the relationship that they were "too fast, too young". He has had relationships with American model Nicole Narain, singer Britney Spears and actresses Angelina Jolie, Elizabeth Taylor, Maeve Quinlan, and Demi Moore.

He has a son, James Padraig Farrell, born on 12 September 2003, with American model Kim Bordenave. In October 2007, he said that his son has Angelman syndrome, a rare genetic disorder characterised by intellectual and developmental delay, lack of speech, and an excitable demeanour.

From 2007 to 2008, Farrell dated Irish medical student Muireann McDonnell. Farrell and British-American writer Emma Forrest dated for over a year, an experience she discussed in depth in her memoir Your Voice in My Head (which mostly focused on her relationship with her therapist, who died unexpectedly). According to Forrest, she and Farrell planned to have a child together before he ended the relationship.

On 7 October 2009, Farrell's second son, Henry Tadeusz Farrell, was born to Polish actress Alicja Bachleda-Curuś (his Ondine co-star). Farrell and Bachleda-Curuś split in 2010.

=== Drug addiction and sobriety ===
Farrell said in an interview that he had "been drunk or high since [he] was 14." In December 2005, he checked into a rehabilitation centre for addictions to recreational drugs and painkillers. He commented on the topic during an interview on Late Show with David Letterman after leaving rehab, and continued later to talk about it. He said, "There was an energy that was created, a character that was created, that no doubt benefited me... then there was a stage where it all began to crumble around me."

Farrell has been sober since leaving the rehab centre in 2006, and has credited his sobriety to his elder son James. In 2018, he voluntarily checked himself into rehab, as a "preemptive measure", in order to maintain his sobriety.

=== Sex tape ===
In January 2006, Farrell filed a lawsuit against his ex-girlfriend, American model Nicole Narain, and the Internet Commerce Group (ICG) for the unauthorised public distribution of a 15-minute sex tape they had made in 2003. He was offered $5 million for its rights. While ICG tried to release it, Narain said that she would work with Farrell to ensure that the tape remained private. Farrell said she tried to release it to damage his acting career and "make money out of it", which Narain denied. On 16 April 2006, they reached a confidential settlement; Farrell's lawsuit against ICG continued with a trial date of 21 July 2006, and was eventually settled amicably.

== See also ==
- List of Academy Award winners and nominees from Ireland
- List of actors with Academy Award nominations
- List of Golden Globe winners
