= Tony Byrne (footballer, born 1941) =

Irish footballer

Anthony Byrne (born 13 September 1941) is an Irish former footballer who played as an inside right.

== Career ==
He joined Shamrock Rovers in 1960, and scored twice as Rovers beat Red Star Belgrade 5–1 in July 1961 in New York City .

Byrne played once in the European Champion Clubs' Cup for Rovers.

He shared a benefit game with Tommy Farrell in May 1965 .

Byrne signed for Shelbourne in 1965 and later played for Transport.

In September 1982 Byrne bought Shelbourne Football Club Limited.

== Sources ==
- Paul Doolan; Robert Goggins. The Hoops. ISBN 0-7171-2121-6.
