= Eamon Farrell =

Irish footballer (1942–2025)

Personal information
- Date of birth: 1942
- Place of birth: Glasnevin, Dublin, Ireland
- Date of death: 9 April 2025 (aged 83)
- Place of death: Beaumont, Dublin, Ireland
- Position: Half back

Youth career
- Home Farm

Senior career*
Years	Team	Apps	(Gls)
1960–1963	Shamrock Rovers		
- * Club domestic league appearances and goals

Eamon Farrell (1942 – 9 April 2025) was an Irish footballer. A half back, he had a brief tenure with Shamrock Rovers.

== Career ==
Born in Glasnevin, Farrell began his footballing career with the underage section at Home Farm. He was also a minor and schoolboy Ireland international. Farrell joined Shamrock Rovers in 1960 at the age of 18. He was part of their FAI Cup-winning team in 1962, when Rovers beat Shelbourne in the final.

== Personal life and death ==
Following his retirement as a professional footballer, Farrell ran a number of businesses in Dublin, including restaurants and the Health Matters chain of health food shops. His brother, Tommy Farrell, also played with Shamrock Rovers. His son, Colin Farrell, is an Academy Award-nominated actor.

Farrell died after a long illness on 9 April 2025, at the age of 83.

== Honours ==
Shamrock Rovers

- FAI Cup: 1961–62
