= Mark Stevens (film editor) =

American film editor

- Occupation: Film editor
- Years active: 1979–present

Mark Stevens is an American film editor. He is best known for his collaborations with film director Joel Schumacher. Some of their collaborations include Batman & Robin, 8mm, Tigerland, Phone Booth and The Number 23. He also worked as an assistant editor on the films Hard to Kill, If Looks Could Kill, The Hand That Rocks the Cradle and The Fugitive.

== Filmography ==
Feature films:

- Hard to Kill (1990)
- If Looks Could Kill (1991)
- The Hand That Rocks the Cradle (1992)
- The Fugitive (1993)
- Batman Forever (1995)
- Chain Reaction (1996)
- Batman & Robin (1997)
- 8mm (1999)
- Flawless (1999)
- Tigerland (2000)
- Phone Booth (2002)
- Freddy vs. Jason (2003)
- Stay Alive (2006)
- The Number 23 (2007)
- The Final Destination (2009)
- Blood Creek (2009)
- Setup (2011)
- The Collection (2012)
- Die Fighting (2014)
- Leprechaun: Origins (2014)
- Patient Zero (2018)

Television films:

- Angel on My Shoulder (1980)
- Will There Really Be a Morning? (1983)
- Return of the Man from U.N.C.L.E. (1983)
- My Wicked, Wicked Ways: The Legend of Errol Flynn (1985)
- First Steps (1985)
- Who Gets the Friends? (1988)
- The Hunt for the BTK Killer (2005)
- Petals on the Wind (2014)
- New York Prison Break the Seduction of Joyce Mitchell (2017)
