= Phone Booth (film) =

2002 thriller film

- Theatrical release poster
- Directed by: Joel Schumacher
- Written by: Larry Cohen
- Produced by: Gil Netter; David Zucker
- Starring: Colin Farrell; Forest Whitaker; Katie Holmes; Radha Mitchell; Kiefer Sutherland
- Cinematography: Matthew Libatique
- Edited by: Mark Stevens
- Music by: Harry Gregson-Williams
- Production companies: Fox 2000 Pictures; Zucker/Netter Productions
- Distributed by: 20th Century Fox
- Release dates: September 10, 2002 (TIFF); April 4, 2003 (United States)
- Running time: 81 minutes
- Country: United States
- Language: English
- Budget: $13 million
- Box office: $97.8 million

Phone Booth is a 2002 American psychological thriller film directed by Joel Schumacher, produced by David Zucker and Gil Netter, written by Larry Cohen and starring Colin Farrell, Forest Whitaker, Katie Holmes, Radha Mitchell, and Kiefer Sutherland. In the film, a malevolent hidden sniper calls a phone booth, and when a young publicist inside answers the phone, he quickly finds his life is at risk.

Produced by Fox 2000 Pictures and Zucker/Netter Productions, the film premiered at the 2002 Toronto International Film Festival, and was set to be theatrically released in November 2002, but the D.C. sniper attacks in October 2002 prompted 20th Century Fox to delay the release of the film, and it was then released theatrically in the United States on April 4, 2003.

The film received generally positive reviews from critics and grossed $97.8 million worldwide, against a $13 million budget.

== Plot ==
Stuart Shepard is an arrogant and dishonest New York City publicist who has been planning an affair with a client, Pamela McFadden, behind the back of his wife Kelly. While in Times Square, Stuart uses a public phone booth to contact Pamela, allowing him to avoid detection by Kelly. During the call, he is interrupted by a pizza delivery man who attempts to deliver a free pizza to him, but Stuart aggressively turns him away. As soon as Stuart completes his call, the phone rings. Stuart answers; a man on the other end, who knows his name, warns him not to leave the booth, threatening to tell Kelly about Pam.

The caller tells Stuart that he has tested two previous individuals who have committed crimes (pedophilia and corporate corruption) using the same process, giving each a chance to reveal the truth to those they wronged. In both cases, they refused and were killed. Stuart must confess his feelings to both Kelly and Pam to avoid the same fate. To demonstrate the threat, the caller fires a suppressed sniper rifle with pinpoint accuracy. The caller then contacts Pam and connects her to Stuart, who admits he is married.

The booth is approached by three prostitutes demanding to use the phone, but Stuart refuses to leave, without revealing his dilemma. Leon, a pimp, breaks the glass side of the booth, grabs Stuart and pummels him while the prostitutes cheer. The caller offers to "make him stop" and in Stuart's confusion, he inadvertently asks for this; the caller shoots Leon dead. The prostitutes immediately blame Stuart, accusing him of having a gun, as the police and news crews converge on the location.

NYPD Captain Ed Ramey seals off the area and negotiates to make Stuart leave the booth, but he refuses. Stuart tells the caller that there is no way they can incriminate him, but the caller draws his attention to a handgun planted on the roof of the phone booth. As Kelly and Pam both arrive on the scene, the caller demands that Stuart tell Kelly the truth, which he does. The caller then orders Stuart to choose between Kelly and Pam, and the woman he does not choose will be shot.

Stuart secretly uses his cell phone to call Kelly, allowing her to overhear his conversation with the caller; she quietly informs Ramey of this. Meanwhile, Stuart continues to confess to everyone that his whole life is a lie, to make himself look better than he really is. Stuart's confession provides sufficient distraction to allow the police to trace the payphone call to a nearby building. Stuart warns the caller that the police are on the way, and the caller replies that if he is caught, he will kill Kelly. Desperate, Stuart grabs the handgun and leaves the booth, begging for the sniper to kill him instead. The police fire upon Stuart, while a SWAT team breaks into the room that the caller was tracked to, only to find a rifle and a man's corpse.

Stuart regains consciousness; the police had fired only rubber bullets, stunning but not harming him. Stuart and Kelly happily reconcile. As the police bring down the body, Stuart identifies it as the pizza delivery man from earlier. Stuart gets medical treatment at a local ambulance. After getting a shot from a paramedic, he starts losing consciousness. The real caller passes by, warning Stuart that if his newfound honesty does not last, he will return, before disappearing into the crowd, while the pay phone rings again.

== Cast ==
- Colin Farrell as Stuart "Stu" Shepard, a selfish and dishonest publicist who becomes a victim of a mysterious caller who threatens to kill him
- Kiefer Sutherland as The Caller, an unnamed, malevolent, scheming killer and trained sniper who calls Stu in the phone booth and holds him hostage
- Forest Whitaker as Capt. Ed Ramey, a police captain who gives assistance to Stu in his conflict against The Caller, but suspects him as the killer
- Katie Holmes as Pamela "Pam" McFadden, Stu's mistress
- Radha Mitchell as Kelly Shepard, Stu's wife
- Paula Jai Parker as Felicia
- Tia Texada as Asia
- John Enos III as Leon
- Richard T. Jones as Sergeant Jonah Cole
- Keith Nobbs as Adam
- Josh Pais as Mario
- Ben Foster as "Big Q" (uncredited)
- Jared Leto as Bobby (in a deleted scene)

== Production ==
=== Development and casting ===
In the 1960s, Larry Cohen pitched Alfred Hitchcock an idea for a film which took place in real-time, entirely within the confines of a telephone booth. Hitchcock liked the idea, but the project did not move forward, because the two men were unable to devise a plot which explained why the action had to be restricted to one location. Cohen recalled that Hitchcock would ask him if he had a solution to the problem when they periodically met over the following years, but it was not until the late 1990s, some two decades after Hitchcock's death, when he came up with the answer of a sniper forcing the protagonist to remain within the phone booth, and was able to write a script.

Creative Artists Agency signed a contract with Cohen and the script appealed to several A-list actors, such as Tom Cruise, Will Smith, Mel Gibson, Robin Williams, Anthony Hopkins, and Nicolas Cage; directors placed in contention included Gibson, Steven Spielberg, the Hughes brothers, and Michael Bay. According to Cohen, Bay was removed from consideration after the first question he asked about the script was, "OK, how do we get this thing out of the damn telephone booth?" Eventually, Joel Schumacher, who had been considered early in development, was brought back on to direct the film. Jim Carrey was originally cast as Stu Shepard, but he dropped out. Schumacher said: "We were going to shoot it that summer and he was fitted for the suit. But I got a call from Jim one night and told me he had cold feet. He really didn't feel comfortable with it. Actors never give up their role. If an actor gives up a part then it's not right for them."

For the film, Irish lead Colin Farrell used a fake Bronx-style American accent, with his on-screen wife (played by Australian Radha Mitchell) also using a fake American accent for the film. During this period, Farrell was noted for his versality with accents, since he also created a fake Southern accent for 2000's Tigerland and a neutral American accent for 2002's Minority Report.

=== Filming ===
The principal photography on the film was completed in ten days, with an additional two days of establishing shots, pickups, and re-shoots. This accelerated filming schedule was aided by the adoption of French hours, a work schedule that skips the typical one-hour production shutdown for the lunch break, in exchange for making food available all throughout the shooting day.

The filming was done with Ron Eldard cast in the role of The Caller. During filming, Eldard delivered his performance from the window of a building across the street from the phone booth Farrell was in. The role was recast with Kiefer Sutherland after screenwriter Cohen told director Schumacher that Eldard's "voice lacked the mesmerizing tone" that Cohen wanted. Sutherland rerecorded all of The Caller's lines for use in the final film.

This was costume designer Daniel Orlandi's second feature with Joel Schumacher, having previously worked together on Flawless. According to him, Dolce & Gabbana created the suit and shirt worn by Colin Farrell. Though the fashion house was tasked with making additional suit copies for filming, they would not arrive until the last day of shooting. However, the film was shot chronologically and thus the costume could sustain damage without slowing down production. Orlandi was able to keep one of the suit copies for himself as he and Farrell were the same size.

The film is set in real time, so the timespan in which the film takes place is as long as it takes to watch it, much like the television series 24, which also stars Kiefer Sutherland. Like 24, it also uses split screens. Although the film is set in New York City, it was filmed in front of what is now the CB1 Gallery in downtown Los Angeles, in November 2000. This is made evident by the LACMTA buses periodically driving by. The exact location of the phone booth in the film is the corner of West 5th Street and Frank Court, given away by the black gate in the background.

== Release ==
=== Theatrical ===
The film premiered on September 10, 2002, at the Toronto International Film Festival. It was originally due to be released in the United States on November 15 of that year. However, in October 2002, the Beltway sniper attacks occurred in the Washington, D.C., area, prompting 20th Century Fox to delay the release of the film to April 4, 2003.

=== Home media and rights ===
In the U.S., 20th Century Fox Home Entertainment released it on VHS and DVD on July 8, 2003. In the United Kingdom (Region 2) it was released on DVD by Fox on August 11, 2003. The film also received an Australian (Region 4) VHS/DVD release on November 12, 2003, from 20th Century Fox Home Entertainment South Pacific. In February 2007, Fox released the movie on Blu-ray.

In 2019, Rupert Murdoch sold most of 21st Century Fox's film and television assets to Disney, and Phone Booth was one of the films included in the deal. Disney made it available to stream on Hulu, one of the additional assets they acquired from Fox in 2019. It was made available on Disney+ in the United States on April 2022, as an effort to appeal to mature audiences, but the decision was eventually dropped by the time it became available in Canada instead. In certain territories without Hulu, it was made available on Disney+.

== Reception ==
=== Box office ===
Phone Booth grossed $46.6 million domestically (United States and Canada) and $51.3 million in other territories, for a worldwide total of $97.8 million, against a budget of $13 million. It peaked at No. 1 at the domestic box office in its first week, its first of 4 consecutive weeks in the Top 10.

=== Critical response ===
On the review aggregator website Rotten Tomatoes, 72% of 187 critics' reviews are positive, with an average rating of 6.7/10. The website's consensus reads: "Quick pacing and Farrell's performance help make Phone Booth a tense nail-biter." Metacritic, which uses a weighted average, assigned the film a score of 56 out of 100, based on 36 critics, indicating "mixed or average" reviews.

Roger Ebert of the Chicago Sun-Times gave the film three out of four stars, and said of Sutherland's performance, "if the voice doesn't work, neither does the movie. It does." Todd McCarthy of Variety magazine criticized the film for not having enough material even for its relatively short length, and wrote: "Gussied up with a host of filmmaking tricks in an attempt to keep things lively, this intensely acted little exercise just doesn't have enough going for it, with the exception of gradually growing interest in lead Colin Farrell."

== See also ==
- La cabina (The Telephone Box, 1972 Spanish short film that won the 1973 International Emmy Award for Fiction)
- "The Jeopardy Room" (The Twilight Zone)
- Liberty Stands Still (2002 film), starring Wesley Snipes and Linda Fiorentino, that shares similar plot and theme
- Knock Out (2010 film), an unauthorized Bollywood remake of Phone Booth
- Locke (2013 film)
