= Horrible Bosses =

2011 American comedy film

- Theatrical release poster
- Directed by: Seth Gordon
- Screenplay by: Michael Markowitz; John Francis Daley; Jonathan Goldstein
- Story by: Michael Markowitz
- Produced by: Brett Ratner; Jay Stern
- Starring: Jason Bateman; Charlie Day; Jason Sudeikis; Jennifer Aniston; Colin Farrell; Kevin Spacey; Donald Sutherland; Jamie Foxx
- Cinematography: David Hennings
- Edited by: Peter Teschner
- Music by: Christopher Lennertz
- Production companies: New Line Cinema; Rat Entertainment
- Distributed by: Warner Bros. Pictures
- Release dates: June 30, 2011 (Grauman's Chinese Theatre); July 8, 2011 (United States)
- Running time: 98 minutes
- Country: United States
- Language: English
- Budget: $35–37 million
- Box office: $209.8 million

Horrible Bosses is a 2011 American crime black comedy film directed by Seth Gordon and written by Michael Markowitz, John Francis Daley, and Jonathan Goldstein, from a story by Markowitz. It stars Jason Bateman, Charlie Day, Jason Sudeikis, Jennifer Aniston, Colin Farrell, Kevin Spacey, Donald Sutherland, and Jamie Foxx.

The plot follows three friends, played by Bateman, Day, and Sudeikis, who decide to murder their respective overbearing, abusive bosses, portrayed by Spacey, Aniston, and Farrell.

Markowitz's script was bought by New Line Cinema in 2005 and the film spent six years in various states of pre-production, with a variety of actors attached to different roles. By 2010, Goldstein and Daley had rewritten the script, and the film finally went into production.

The film premiered at Grauman's Chinese Theatre on June 30, 2011, and was released on July 8, 2011, by Warner Bros. Pictures. The film received mixed reviews and grossed $209.8 million worldwide. A sequel, Horrible Bosses 2, was released on November 26, 2014.

== Plot ==
Nick Hendricks, Dale Arbus, and Kurt Buckman are friends working in Riverside, California, who despise their bosses: Nick works at a financial firm for the sadistic Dave Harken, who hints at a possible promotion for Nick for months, only to award it to himself; Dale is a dental assistant being sexually harassed by his boss, Dr. Julia Harris, who threatens to tell his fiancée Stacy that he had sex with her unless he actually has sex with her; Kurt enjoys working for the kind-hearted Jack Pellit at his chemical company, but after Jack unexpectedly dies of a heart attack, the company is taken over by Jack's arrogant, cocaine-addicted son Bobby, whose apathy and incompetence threaten the future of the company.

One night, over drinks, Kurt jokingly suggests that their lives would be happier if their bosses were no longer alive. Initially hesitant, they eventually agree to kill their bosses. In search of a hitman, the trio meet Dean "Motherfucker" Jones, an ex-con who offers to be their "murder consultant." Jones suggests that they kill each other's bosses to hide their motives, while making the deaths look like accidents.

The trio sneak into Bobby's house, and Kurt steals his phone. They next go to Harken's house, where Kurt and Nick go inside while Dale waits in the car as a lookout. Harken returns home and confronts Dale for littering, and then has an allergic reaction from the peanut butter on the litter. Dale saves him by stabbing him with an EpiPen, but Nick and Kurt think he is stabbing Harken to death and flee, with Kurt accidentally dropping Bobby's phone in Harken's bedroom.

The next night, Kurt watches Julia's home, but she seduces and has sex with him. Nick and Dale wait outside Bobby's and Harken's houses, respectively, to commit the murders, but are hesitant to follow through. Harken discovers Bobby's phone in his bedroom and uses it to find his address, suspecting his wife, Rhonda, is having an affair with Bobby. Harken drives over and shoots Bobby dead, while Nick secretly witnesses the murder.

Nick flees at high speed, setting off a traffic camera. The trio meet at a bar and plan to leave the police an anonymous tip to get Harken arrested. However, the police bring them in for questioning, as the camera footage makes Nick the prime suspect in Bobby's murder.

Dale points out that they lack sufficient evidence to hold them there, forcing the police to release them. However, the trio are warned that forensics is sweeping the house for DNA, so they realize the prank Kurt pulled during their first break-in has left enough evidence to convict them. The trio consult with Jones again, but learn that he never actually killed anyone or committed any felonies, having been imprisoned for only bootlegging a film. Jones suggests that they get Harken to confess and secretly tape it.

The three accidentally crash Harken's surprise birthday party, where Nick and Dale get Harken to confess to the murder before realizing that Kurt, who has the audio recorder, is elsewhere having sex with Rhonda. Harken threatens to kill all three for attempting to blackmail him. They flee in Kurt's car, but Harken gives chase and repeatedly rams them, damaging their car and slowing it down.

The crashes alert Kurt's navigation-system operator Gregory who, believing they have committed a crime, remotely disables the car, allowing Harken to catch and hold them at gunpoint. He boasts to the trio about his plan to frame them for the murder, before he shoots himself in the leg to paint himself as a victim. The police arrive to arrest the trio, but Gregory plays a recording that has Harken confessing to Bobby's murder.

Harken is sentenced to 25 years to life in prison, while the friends get their charges waived. Nick is promoted to president of the company with a raise under a friendly but slightly psychotic CEO; Kurt remains in his position under a promoted co-worker; Dale, with the help of Jones, blackmails Julia into ending her harassment.

== Cast ==
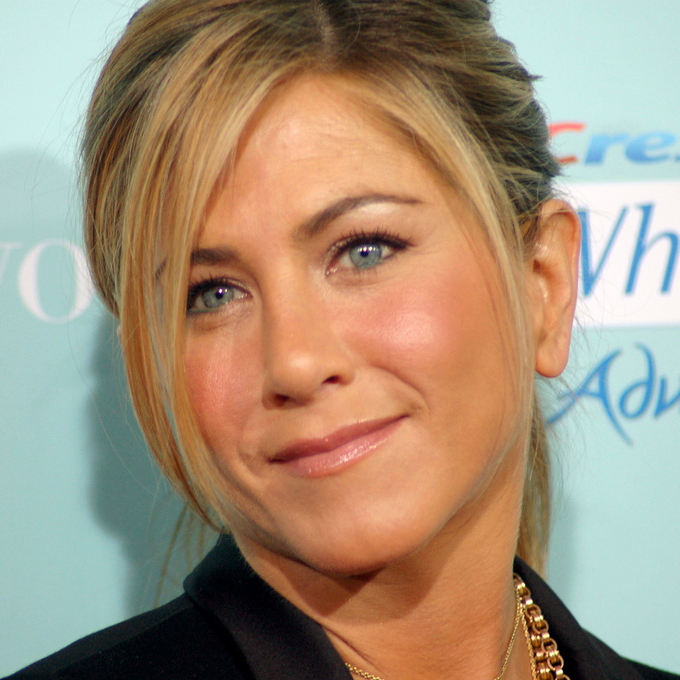
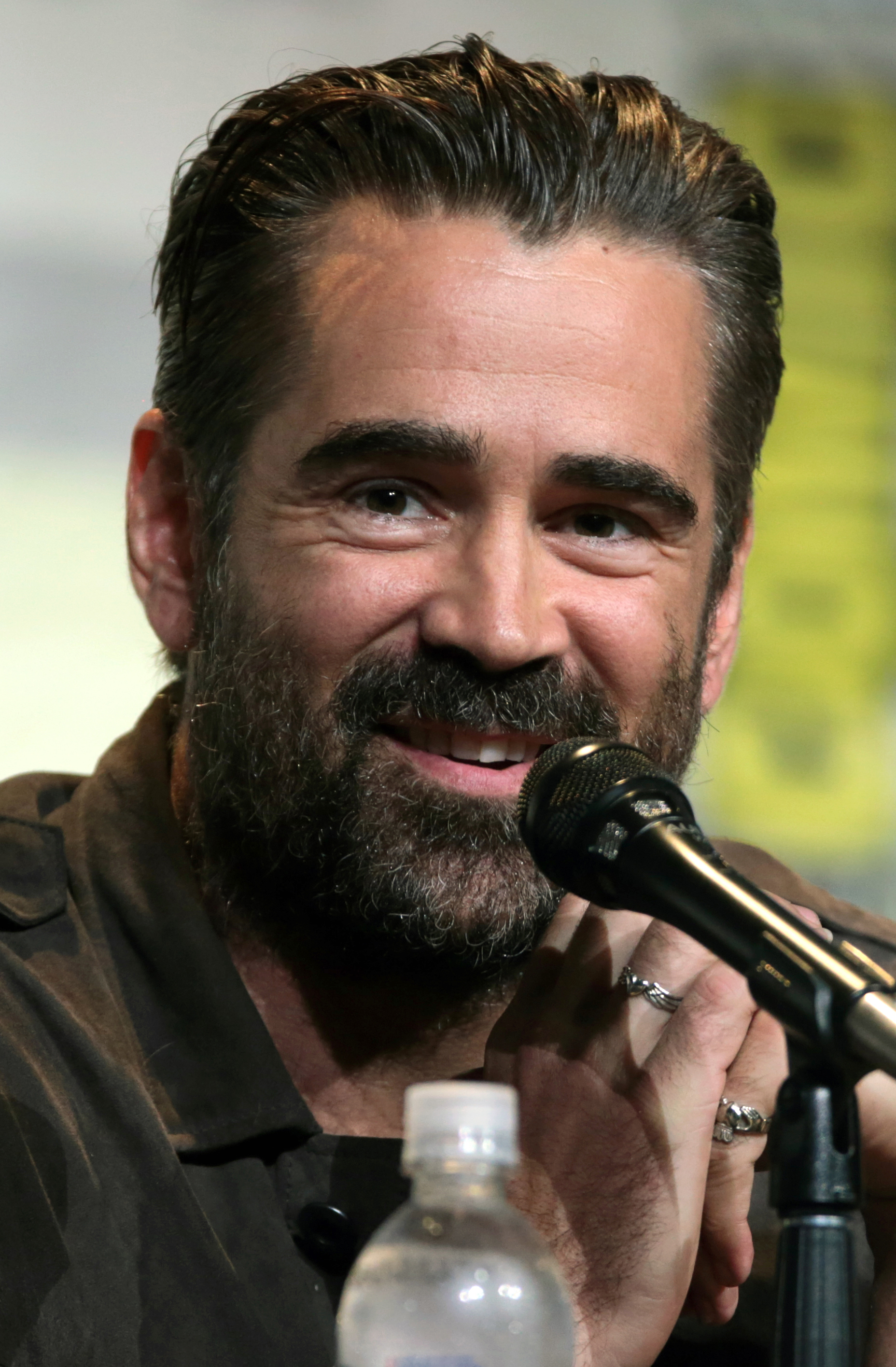
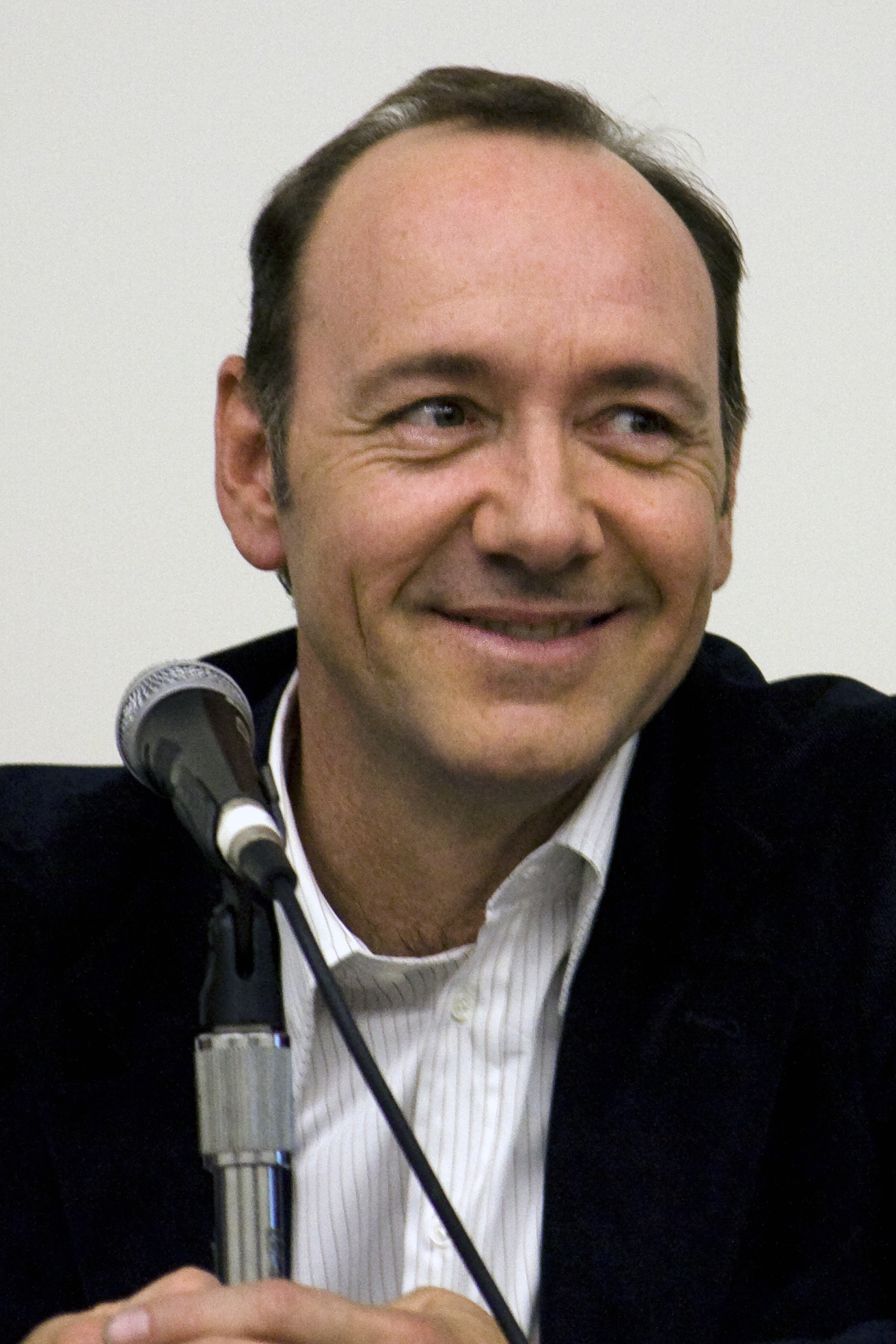
Top to bottom: Aniston, Farrell and Spacey, who portray the titular bosses.
- Jason Bateman as Nick Hendricks:
  An executive at a financial firm who is manipulated into jumping through hoops in order to get a promotion that his boss never intended to give him. Markowitz wrote the role specifically for Bateman.
- Charlie Day as Dale Arbus:
  A dental assistant who is sexually harassed by his boss. Described as a "hopeless romantic" in love with his fiancée. Day was considered for the role following his co-starring performance with Sudeikis in the 2010 film Going the Distance, a performance which Reuters reported that industry insiders believed overshadowed the main stars.
- Jason Sudeikis as Kurt Buckman:
  An account manager at a chemical company dealing with a new, drug-addicted boss after his beloved former boss dies. Sudeikis was cast in May 2010.
- Jennifer Aniston as Dr. Julia Harris, D.D.S.:
  Markowitz based the character on a former boss, claiming she was "very sexually aggressive with everybody". When writing the script, Markowitz intended for the role to go to Aniston. He stated the character "looked more like Cruella de Vil. It was like flirting with a cobweb." Aniston wore a brown wig for the role, wanting to look different from other characters she had played.
- Colin Farrell as Bobby Pellit:
  Described as a "weaselly scion" and a "corrupt and incompetent jerk who's in charge of things but clearly has no idea what he's doing." Farrell explained the motivation he gave to the character, stating "This guy thinks he's God's gift to women, God's gift to intellect, to humor, to the club scene, to everything [...] With Pellit, Seth gave me complete license to act as pathologically screwed up as possible." Farrell contributed significantly to the appearance of his character, suggesting the comb over hairstyle, pot-belly and an affinity for Chinese dragons.
- Kevin Spacey as Dave Harken:
  President of Comnidyne Industries. Gordon commented that the character was an amalgamation of several real bosses (rather than one single person) to avoid being sued.
- Donald Sutherland as Jack Pellit, Bobby's father and Kurt's boss.
- Jamie Foxx as Dean 'Motherfucker' Jones:
  The character had the more "colorful" name "Cocksucker Jones", but it was changed to "Motherfucker Jones" at Foxx's request, with producer Jay Stern commenting that Foxx felt it "was over the line". Foxx contributed to his character's appearance, suggesting full-scalp tattoos and a retro clothing style. Foxx described the appearance as "a guy who maybe went to jail for a minute and now he's living in his own time capsule. When he got out he went right back to the clothes he thought were hot when he went in."
- Julie Bowen as Rhonda, Harken's wife. Bowen stated that her character "may or may not be a hussy", the character described as intentionally making her husband jealous.
- P. J. Byrne as Kenny Sommerfeld, a former investment manager and friend from high school of Nick, Dale and Kurt, now scrounging for drinks.
- Wendell Pierce and Ron White as Detectives Hagan and Samson, a pair of cops.
- Lindsay Sloane as Dale's fiancée Stacy.

On July 27, 2010, Isaiah Mustafa was confirmed as joining the cast, appearing as Officer Wilkens. Ioan Gruffudd has a cameo as a male urophile prostitute erroneously hired as a hitman. Bob Newhart makes a cameo as sadistic Comnidyne CEO Louis Sherman. John Francis Daley, a screenwriter on the film, cameos as Nick's co-worker Carter. Meghan Markle has a role in the film as a FedEx girl. Brian George voices navigation-system operator Gregory, whose real name, Atmanand, the trio have difficulty pronouncing. Chad Coleman appears as a bar owner.

== Production ==
=== Development ===
Michael Markowitz's script for Horrible Bosses was sold at auction to New Line Cinema by Brett Ratner's production company Rat Entertainment in 2005 for a six-figure amount. Ratner initially was interested in directing, but became occupied with directing the comedy Tower Heist. Frank Oz and David Dobkin were in talks to direct. Jonathan Goldstein and John Francis Daley rewrote the script in 2010, and the project went into production with Seth Gordon directing.

=== Casting ===
During the six-year development of the film, several actors were in negotiations to star, including Owen Wilson, Vince Vaughn, Matthew McConaughey, Ryan Reynolds, Dax Shepard, and Johnny Knoxville. Tom Cruise, Bob Saget, Philip Seymour Hoffman, and Jeff Bridges had been approached by New Line Cinema to take the role of Dave Harken, described as a psychopathic master manipulator with an attractive wife. Kevin Spacey signed up for the role in June 2010. Ashton Kutcher was in talks to play Dale Arbus at two different points in the lengthy production, before the role ultimately went to Charlie Day.

=== Design ===
"It's like we have a team of three people playing against an opposing team of three, with the Jamie Foxx character as referee. We wanted to distinguish these three environments and play the two sides off each other. Each environment is a reflection of the person who controls it."

— Production designer Shepherd Frankel on the approach to set design.

Production designer Shepherd Frankel specifically set out to create distinctly different environments for the three employees and their respective bosses' homes and offices. Nick and Harken's workplace is the "Comnidyne" bullpen, which was designed to "enhance the discomfort and anxiety of lower-level employees clustered in the center of the room where every movement is monitored by the boss from his corner office."

The design team met with financial strategists and management companies to learn about the architecture of their office layouts to visually represent the experience of starting from a low-ranking position in a cubicle and aspiring to an office. Costume designer Carol Ramsey worked with Frankel and set decorator Jan Pascale to match Harken's suit to that of the surrounding "cold grey and blue" color palette of his office. Harken's home was described as "equally lacking in warmth" as the office but more lavishly decorated and "for show", including an intentionally oversized portrait of him with his "trophy wife".

Designing Julia's office was described as a "challenge", infusing a "sensual vibe" into a dental office. Frankel approached the design through Julia's mentality, stating, "She's a Type A professional at the top of her game, who likes to play cat-and-mouse, so it's a completely controlled environment, with apertures and views into other rooms so she always knows what's going on". "It's highly designed, with rich wallpaper and tones, sumptuous artwork and subtle lighting—all very disarming till you step into her private office. The blinds close, the door locks and you think, 'It's the Temple of Doom.'" Similarly approaching the character's home, the design allowed for wide windows which face onto a public street "which afford her the opportunity to put on the kind of show she couldn't get away with at work."

Bobby's environments were designed with more contrast, the character being new to the work area. Frankel described the contrast as "the company reflects [Jack Pellitt's] human touch, whereas [Bobby Pellitt's] home is a shameless shrine to himself and his hedonistic appetites." Frankel continued, "It features a mishmash of anything he finds exotic and erotic, mostly Egyptian and Asian motifs with an '80s Studio 54 vibe, a makeshift dojo, lots of mirrors and a massage table." Some parts of the house design were provided by Farrell and Gordon's interpretation of the character and his "infatuation" with martial arts and "his delusions of prowess".

=== Filming ===
Filming of Horrible Bosses took place in and around Los Angeles. The production team attempted to find locations "that people haven't already seen a hundred times in movies and on TV", aiming for the film to appear as if it could be taking place anywhere in America "where people are trying to pursue the American dream but getting stopped by a horrible boss." "Comnidyine" was represented by an office building in Torrance, California, with the crew building the set on a vacant floor.

For "Pellitt Chemical", the production team found a "perfect landscape of pipes and containers" in Santa Fe Springs, surrounding an unoccupied water cleaning and storage facility. To take advantage of the surrounding imagery, the warehouse required an extensive series of overhauls, including cutting windows into concrete walls and creating new doorways to allow for visuals of the warehouse exterior and provide a setting for the final scene of Sutherland's character. A T.G.I. Friday's in Woodland Hills, Los Angeles, was used as a bar frequented by Nick, Dale, and Kurt, while the bar scene where they meet with Jones was staged in downtown Los Angeles.

The film was shot digitally using the Panavision Genesis camera. Gordon encouraged the actors to improvise, though Aniston claimed to not have taken advantage of the offer as much as her co-stars, stating, "My dialogue was just so beautifully choreographed that there wasn’t much that I needed to do".

=== Music ===
The soundtrack was composed by award-winning composer Christopher Lennertz, with music contributed by Mike McCready of Pearl Jam, Stefan Lessard of Dave Matthews Band and Money Mark—a collaborator with the Beastie Boys. McCready, Lessard, and Mark worked with musicians Matt Chamberlain, David Levita, Aaron Kaplan, Victor Indrizzo, Chris Chaney, Davey Chegwidden and DJ Cheapshot to develop the music. Major contributions were provided by Mark on keyboard, McCready and Levita on guitar, Chaney and Lessard on bass, Indrizzo on drums and DJ Cheapshot on turntables.

Horrible Bosses: The Original Motion Picture Soundtrack was released in physical and digital formats on July 5, 2011, by WaterTower Music. The soundtrack consists of 33 tracks with a runtime of 63 minutes.

== Release ==
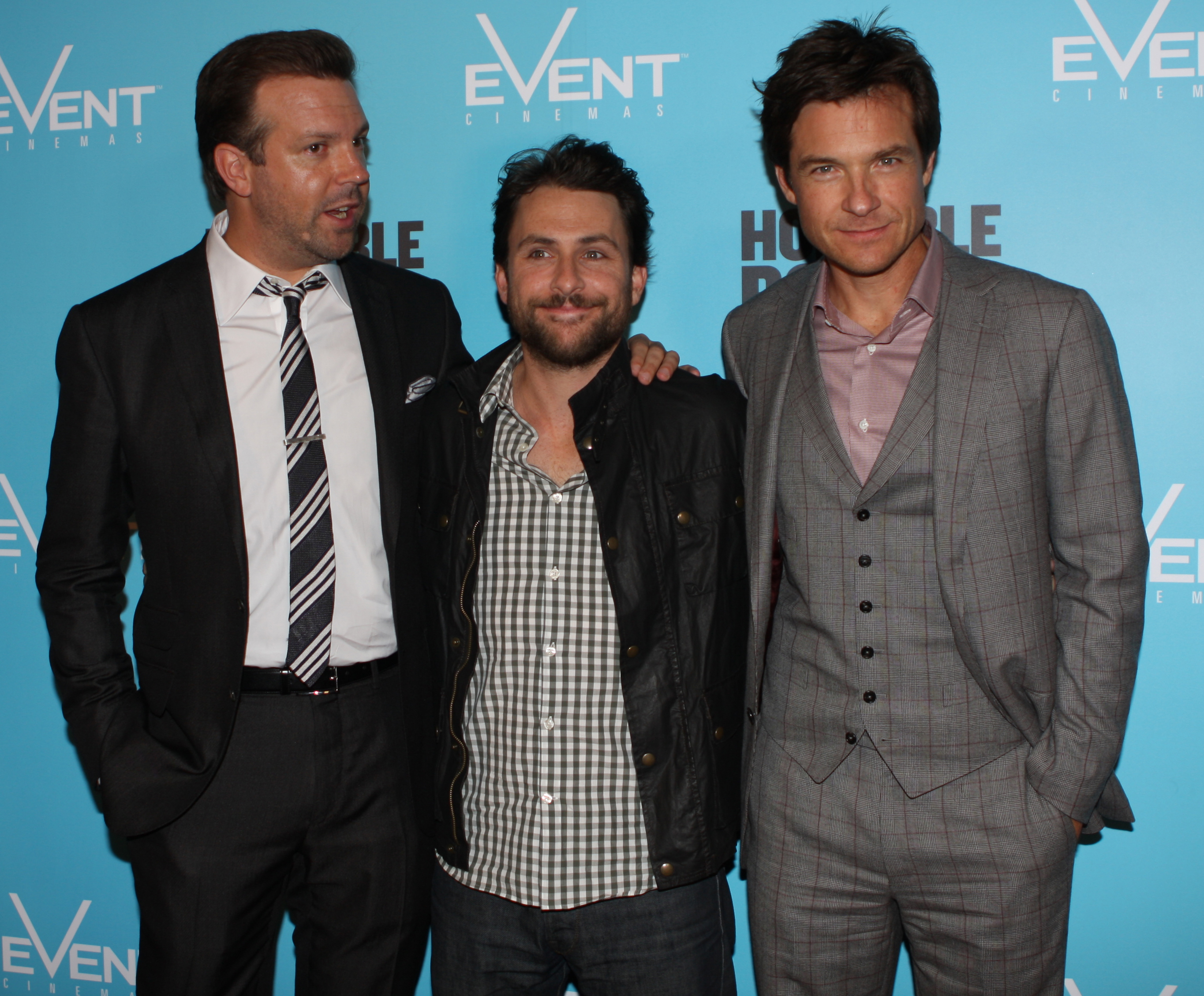
Jason Sudeikis, Charlie Day, and Jason Bateman at the Sydney premiere in August 2011

The world premiere of Horrible Bosses took place on June 30, 2011, at Grauman's Chinese Theatre in Hollywood, California.

=== Box office ===
Horrible Bosses grossed $117.5 million (56.1%) in North America and $92.2 million (43.9%) in other territories for a worldwide gross of $209.8 million, against its budget of $35 million.

North America

Horrible Bosses was released on July 8, 2011, in the United States and Canada across 3,040 theaters. It grossed $9.9 million on the first day, giving it the second largest opening gross for an original R-rated comedy of the summer, behind Bad Teacher ($12.2 million). For the opening weekend, the film took in a total of $28,302,165, an average of $9,310 per theater, making it the number two film for the weekend, behind Transformers: Dark of the Moon ($47.1 million), the second highest-grossing opening weekend for an original R-rated comedy, again behind Bad Teacher ($31.6 million), and the highest-grossing opening weekend ever for a dark/black comedy film, overtaking the 2004 The Stepford Wives ($21.4 million).

The opening weekend audience was 51% male, and 64% of the audience were over 25 years of age. The second weekend (15–17 July) saw a further 94 theaters added, for a total of 3,134. Box office revenue dropped by a "respectable" 38%, taking $17.6 million for a total gross of $60 million in ten days. The film ranked third for the weekend. It remained in the top five films during its third week, dropping 33% and leaving thirty theaters from the previous weekend, to take in $11.9 million for a gross of $82.6 million in 17 days. On July 28, 2011, with $87.6 million after 20 days, Horrible Bosses surpassed The War of the Roses ($86.8 million) to become the highest grossing dark/black comedy film in unadjusted dollars.

Other territories

Horrible Bosses was released on July 7, 2011, in the United Arab Emirates ($258,108), and on July 8 in Estonia ($24,471), Latvia ($15,750), Lebanon ($36,316) and Lithuania ($13,676), grossing $348,321 for the opening weekend and accruing a total of $855,009 in the first 17 days. On the weekend of July 21–24, the film opened in the United Kingdom ($3,386,876), Greece ($367,845), Israel ($200,372), South Africa ($193,632), Norway ($109,252) and East Africa ($7,324).

== Reception ==
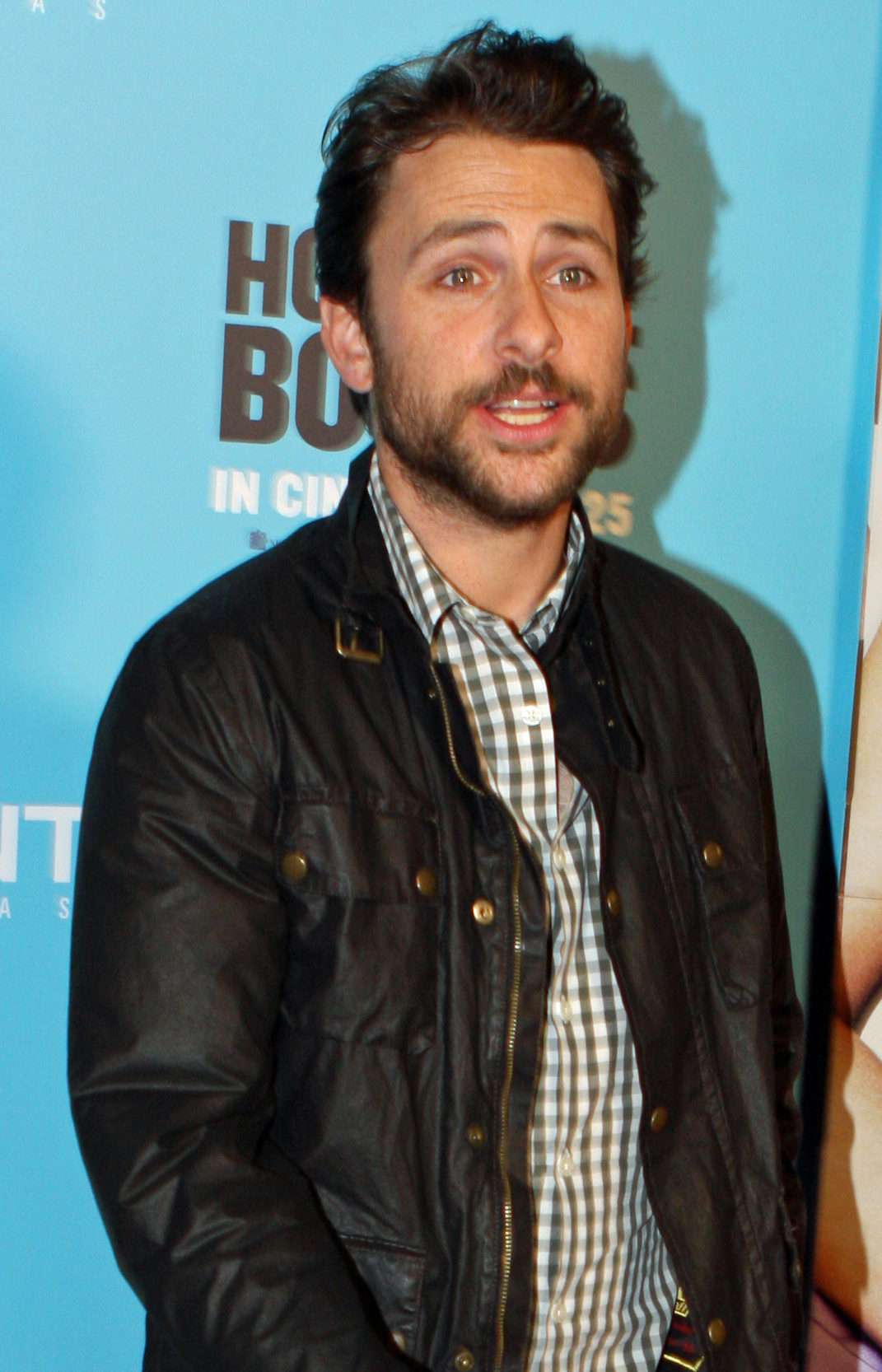
Charlie Day was singled out for praise by several critics for his performance.

On Rotten Tomatoes, the film holds an approval rating of 69% based on 220 reviews, with an average rating of 6.2/10. The website's critical consensus reads, "It's nasty, uneven, and far from original, but thanks to a smartly assembled cast that makes the most of a solid premise, Horrible Bosses works." Metacritic assigned the film a weighted average score of 57 out of 100, based on 40 critics, indicating "mixed or average" reviews. Audiences polled by CinemaScore gave the film an average grade of "B+" on an A+ to F scale; male audience members gave the film an "A−" compared to females giving it an average rating of "B+".

Roger Ebert gave the film three and a half stars out of four, calling it "well-cast" and commending it for playing to each actor's strengths. Ebert gave particular praise to Spacey, labeling him "superb", and Aniston, judging her performance to be a "surprise" and a return to form, stating "she has acute comic timing and hilariously enacts alarming sexual hungers". Ebert called Horrible Bosses "cheerful and wicked". Lisa Schwarzbaum of Entertainment Weekly reacted positively, calling the film "a bouncy, well-built, delightfully nasty tale of resentment, desperation, and amoral revenge" and complimented the casting of the protagonists and antagonists.

The A.V. Club's Nathan Rabin also praised the cast, stating that the picture "succeeds almost entirely on the chemistry of its three leads, who remain likeable even while resorting to homicide", adding the "acting more than compensates for the film's other failings." Rabin singled out Day's performance as "a potent illustration of how a brilliant character actor with a spark of madness can elevate a ramshackle lowbrow farce into a solid mainstream comedy through sheer force of charisma."

Edward Douglas of ComingSoon.net credited director Seth Gordon with having assembled "the perfect cast", claiming "the six leads kill in every scene", but echoed Nathan Rabin's sentiments that Day is the "real standout". Douglas summarized the picture as "dark fun that works better than expected due to a well-developed script, an impeccable cast and a director who knows how to put the two together". A. O. Scott of The New York Times stated "the timing of the cast...is impeccable" and appreciated that the script did not attempt "to cut its coarseness with a hypocritical dose of sweetness or respectability". The review concluded that "in the ways that count and even when it shouldn’t, Horrible Bosses works."

USA Today's Scott Bowles awarded the film three out of four stars, labeling it a "surprising comedy that rivals Bridesmaids as the funniest film of the summer, if not the year." Bowles added that "the characters are so likable", giving particular credit to Sudeikis though also adding praise for the performances of Bateman and Day. The dialogue was also lauded by Bowles, which commented that "Seth Gordon has a deft touch with water-cooler talk—even when the water cooler might be spiked with poison."

Leonard Maltin of indieWire considered Day to have had the "breakout role" and offered praise to the performances of the cast, but lamented the lack of screen time for Farrell's character. Maltin concluded "the movie has just enough raunchiness to identify it as a 2011 comedy, just enough cleverness to admire, and just the right camaraderie among its three male stars, which turns out to be the movie’s greatest strength." Rolling Stone's Peter Travers gave kudos to the "killer cast", with specific credit given to Bateman and Day, but was critical of the movie, stating "it wussies out on a sharp premise" and that it is a "hit-and-miss farce that leaves you wishing it was funnier than it is"

The Guardian's Philip French called Horrible Bosses "a lumbering, misogynistic affair", but admitted "I laughed frequently, probably to the detriment of my self-respect." Nicholas Barber of The Independent gave a positive review, complimenting Gordon for not allowing the actors' improvisation to be detrimental to the pacing, but felt the movie was not as "dark" as its premise required, saying "what edginess the film does have comes instead from the inordinate quantity of swearing, plus a smattering of homophobia and misogyny."

Salon's Andrew O'Hehir offered a mixed response, characterizing the film as a "lot funnier in theory than in practice, but it won't ruin your Saturday night". Salon appreciated the "effortless comic chemistry" between Sudeikis, Bateman and Day and singled out Bateman, Aniston and Spacey for their performances. O'Hehir was however critical of the perceived homophobia, sexism and racism. The Hollywood Reporter's Kirk Honeycutt responded negatively, stating the jokes failed to be funny, stating "Seth Gordon shows no flair for turning the absurdities and cartoonish characters in the script...into anything more than a collection of moments in search of laughs."

Karina Longworth of The Village Voice was critical of the premise, which she felt lacked any legitimate "rage" against the characters' bosses, stating "...there's every sign that, even without these particular emasculators, Dale, Kurt and Nick would still be—for lack of a better word—total pussies." Longworth felt that the humor was "rarely actually laugh-out-loud funny, and never truly dark or daring". She particularly criticized the all-white, male protagonists and a plot she deemed racist and filled with "stereotypes".

Justin Chang of Variety praised the performance of the ensemble cast, but considered the plot to be "predictably moronic, vulgar and juvenile". Chang echoed the sentiments of The Village Voice in lamenting that the film failed to pursue the premise to "darker, more daring territory" and faulted it for falling back on "over-the-top comic exaggeration".

== Accolades ==
The film received several award nominations, including a Satellite Award for Best Supporting Actor for Colin Farrell, and three nominations from the 2012 Comedy Awards, including Comedy Actor for Bateman, Comedy Actress for Aniston, and best Comedy Film. Farrell and Aniston were both nominated for Best On-Screen Dirt Bag at the 2012 MTV Movie Awards, with Aniston claiming the award. Farrell also received a nomination for Best On-Screen Transformation.

List of awards and nominations
Year	Award / Film Festival	Category	Recipient(s) and nominee(s)	Result	Ref.
2011	Critic's Choice Awards	Best Comedy Film	Horrible Bosses	Nominated	
2011	Satellite Awards	Best Supporting Actor - Motion Picture	Colin Farrell	Nominated	
2011	Teen Choice Awards	Choice Summer Movie	Horrible Bosses	Nominated	
2012	Artios Awards	Outstanding Achievement in Casting - Big Budget Comedy Feature	Horrible Bosses - Lisa Beach and Sarah Katzman	Nominated	
2012	BMI Film & TV Awards	Film Music Award	Christopher Lennertz	Won	
2012	Golden Trailer Awards	Best Comedy TV Spot	Horrible Bosses, Warner Bros., Seismic Productions	Nominated	
2012	MTV Movie Awards	Best On-Screen Dirt Bag	Colin Farrell	Nominated	
2012	MTV Movie Awards	Best On-Screen Dirt Bag	Jennifer Aniston	Won	
2012	MTV Movie Awards	Best On-Screen Transformation	Colin Farrell	Nominated	
2012	The Comedy Awards	Comedy Actor - Film	Jason Bateman	Nominated	
2012	The Comedy Awards	Comedy Actress - Film	Jennifer Aniston	Nominated	
2012	The Comedy Awards	Comedy Film	Horrible Bosses	Nominated	

== Home media ==
On July 26, 2011, FX obtained the rights to the network premiere of the film.

Horrible Bosses was released on DVD and Blu-ray Disc in the United States in October 2011, by Warner Home Video. The DVD version sold an estimated 400,682 units in the United States during its first week, earning approximately $6.1 million. It was the number 2 best selling DVD of the week, finishing behind Green Lantern, and the number 3 Blu-ray disc film behind Green Lantern and The Lion King. As of November 2012, it has sold an estimated 1.3 million units and earned $18.3 million.

The DVD contains the theatrical cut of the film and deleted scenes. The Blu-ray Disc edition contains the Blu-ray Disc, the DVD and a digital version of the film in a single pack. The Blu-ray Disc version is an unrated, extended cut (the "Totally Inappropriate Edition") with a runtime of 106 minutes compared to the theatrical 98 minutes. The Blu-ray Disc contains deleted scenes and four featurettes: My Least Favorite Career, Surviving a Horrible Boss, Being Mean Is So Much Fun, and The Making of the Horrible Bosses Soundtrack.

Both the theatrical and extended cuts are presented in the film's original aspect ratio of 2.39:1 with DTS-HD Master Audio sound. Beginning with the Blu-ray Disc release of Horrible Bosses and Green Lantern, Warner Bros. included a code that allows the owner to access a version of the film via UltraViolet, a cloud storage service which allows streaming or downloading to a variety of devices.

== Sequel ==
Seth Gordon confirmed in July 2011 that talks were underway for a sequel, after the financial success of the film in the United States, saying: "Yeah, we've definitely discussed it. It's done well in the States, the film has, so that's becoming a more concerted effort now, we're trying to figure out what the sequel could be." On January 4, 2012, it was confirmed that a sequel was moving forward, and that Goldstein and Daley would be returning to write the script. New Line was reported to be negotiating with Gordon to return as director, with Bateman, Day, and Sudeikis also expected to return to their roles.

In February 2012, it was confirmed that Goldstein and Daley were in the process of writing the new script. In March 2013, Goldstein and Daley confirmed that they had submitted multiple draft scripts for the sequel, and that production had moved towards finalizing the budget. Later in the same month Bateman, Day, and Sudeikis were confirmed to be reprising their roles, with Foxx negotiating to return. The film was again produced by Brett Ratner and Jay Stern. In August 2013, it was announced that Gordon would not be returning to direct because of scheduling conflicts and that the studio was actively searching for a replacement.

In September 2013, Sean Anders was announced as Gordon's replacement, with John Morris joining the production as a producer. The pair had previously performed a rewrite on Goldstein's and Daley's sequel script. Filming had been scheduled to begin in summer 2013, but began in November 2013. Foxx, Aniston, and Spacey reprised their roles, with Christoph Waltz and Chris Pine joining the cast. Horrible Bosses 2 was released on November 26, 2014.
