= Miss Julie (2014 film) =

2014 film

- French poster
- Directed by: Liv Ullmann
- Screenplay by: Liv Ullmann
- Based on: Miss Julie by August Strindberg
- Produced by: Tristan Orpen Lynch; Aoife O'Sullivan; Teun Hilte; Oliver Dungey; Synnøve Hørsdal
- Starring: Jessica Chastain; Colin Farrell; Samantha Morton
- Cinematography: Mikhail Krichman
- Edited by: Michal Leszczylowski
- Production companies: Maipo Film; The Apocalypse Films Company; Senorita Films; Subotica
- Distributed by: Columbia TriStar Nordisk Film Distributors A/S (Norway); Pretty Pictures (France)
- Release dates: 7 September 2014 (TIFF); 10 September 2014 (France); 12 September 2014 (Norway); 4 September 2015 (United Kingdom/Ireland)
- Running time: 130 minutes
- Countries: Norway; United Kingdom; Ireland; France
- Language: English
- Budget: $5.5 million
- Box office: $1 million

Miss Julie is a 2014 period drama film written and directed by Liv Ullmann, based on the 1888 play by August Strindberg and starring Jessica Chastain, Colin Farrell and Samantha Morton. Set in Ireland in this adaptation, it had its world premiere in the Special Presentations section of the 2014 Toronto International Film Festival. It was a co-production of Norway, United Kingdom, Ireland, and France.

The film is set in 1890, in County Fermanagh, Ireland during the course of a single Midsummer Night. Miss Julie, the daughter of an Anglo-Irish landlord, attempts to seduce her father's peasant valet, John. The affair – overshadowed by power and class – quickly goes to some dark places.

== Plot ==
The movie starts with a young Miss Julie aimlessly wandering in the empty confines of her family's manor house. We hear her calling to her absent mother and walking by a babbling brook where she sees one of her dolls stuck in a tree. She lets out a snicker at the sight of the abandoned doll, and leaves the brook.

The movie jumps to Midsummer Night 1890, where the same manor is deserted, save for three individuals; Kathleen the cook (Samantha Morton), John the valet (Colin Farrell) and Miss Julie (Jessica Chastain), the Baron's daughter. Kathleen and John immediately gossip about the lady of the house, specifically how she forced John to dance with her. Kathleen and John are engaged and John doesn't fail to take pleasure in Kathleen's jealous reaction.

Miss Julie enters. Kathleen takes her leave to look after Miss Julie's suffering dog, while the young aristocrat, who appears to be in a mischievous sort of mood, traps John. The night grows stranger still, as servant and lady exchange impassioned monologues composed of lustful innuendoes and agonizing tension.

John confesses that he's been in love with her since he first laid eyes on her as a child, but the next moment sees him quick to remind her of their vastly different positions in the class system. Miss Julie is just as capricious, ordering John around like a slave, and then transforming into a damsel in distress. The back-and-forth continues, until lust overpowers them both and they end up in John's bedroom. Kathleen listens to their coupling through John's bedroom door before returning to her own bedroom and weeping inconsolably.

Back with Miss Julie, John reveals that he has never been in love with her. When they were children, John reveals that he had the same dirty thoughts about her as every other peasant boy on the estate. To Miss Julie's shock, John then unleashes an escalating barrage of verbal and emotional abuse. He calls her a whore and taunts her with the possibility that he may have gotten her pregnant. As a shattered Miss Julie falls into despair, John orders her to break into her father's desk and steal all of his money. He promises her that they will use the money to elope and start a hotel in Switzerland.

John goes to Kathleen and asks to hold each other; she rebuffs him angrily. She begins dressing John in his Sunday clothes, announcing that they are going to church together, where John will ask God for forgiveness. John pretends to agree. Kathleen expresses disgust that John has so little respect for his employers as to sleep with Miss Julie, and that Miss Julie lowered herself to sleep with him in turn. She tells him that they will be leaving the house and seeking employment elsewhere.

Returning with the money and the cage which contains her beloved pet bird, John tells her to leave it. When she refuses, Miss Julie watches in horror as John beheads her bird with a meat cleaver. Having a second breakdown, Miss Julie screams at John, telling him that she hates him and that there is blood between them now.

As Miss Julie picks up the stolen money from the floor, Kathleen arrives in her Sunday clothes. After listening to Miss Julie's monologue about eloping with John and the hotel in Switzerland, Kathleen gently explains to Miss Julie about the strength she draws from her own Christian faith. Miss Julie expresses sadness that she does not share Kathleen's faith.

Before she leaves, Kathleen lovingly urges John to come to church with her, saying gently that he can benefit from a good sermon. To Kathleen's visible distress, John refuses.

As a deeply hurt Kathleen leaves, John gives Miss Julie his straight razor and urges her to commit suicide. Hesitating, Miss Julie expresses fear of going to Hell due to her high social rank. But John replies that Miss Julie is no longer one of the first, having lost her virginity, she is now one of the last.

As John walks up the castle stairs to deliver the Baron's boots and breakfast, Miss Julie walks to the brook seen in the opening moments of the film. The last image seen before the credits is of Miss Julie lying dead by the brook with the stolen money in a bag around her neck, having slit her wrist with John's straight razor.

== Production ==
Oliver Dungey and Teun Hilte of London-based The Apocalypse Films Company Ltd. initiated and produced the film, bringing in Synnøve Hørsdal of Oslo-based Maipo Film along with co-producers Tristan Orpen Lynch and Aoife O'Sullivan of Dublin-based Subotica and Rita Dagher of Paris-based Senorita Films.

Filming began in April 2013. In a change of setting from the original Sweden of the play, the film was shot at Castle Coole, a late 18th-century country mansion in County Fermanagh, Northern Ireland. Filming lasted for five weeks. For Farrell, John was one of the hardest roles in his career due to the source material's "sustained cruelty and trauma".

== Reception ==
As of January 2024, Miss Julie has an approval rating of 53% on review aggregator website Rotten Tomatoes, based on 55 reviews, and an average rating of 5.6/10. The website's critical consensus states, "Miss Julie definitely gives Jessica Chastain and Colin Farrell room to shine, but neglects to leave them a solid enough setting to augment their efforts". Metacritic assigned the film a weighted average score of 56 out of 100, based on 18 critics, indicating "mixed or average reviews".

Dennis Harvey of Variety criticised Ullmann as a director for keeping the film too "static", "airless", and tied to the stage play. Film Journal International noted several issues with the directing, such as the "unnecessary and squishy soft-focus flashbacks" and the "tacky shock effect" of the bird's death. It claimed the incorporation of classical music dipped the experience in "aural 'class' that is merely more distancing for the viewer", and that the overuse of close-up shots led the source material to not "breathe and bloom of its own dramatic accord". Richard Ouzounian criticised the pacing as "just a bit too stately for words".

The film's three stars were acclaimed for their performances. As Tara Brady of The Irish Times described, "Chastain is as brittle and fragile a Miss Julie as ever there was. Her dark eye circles on near translucent skin convey a damaged flightiness and breakability before she utters a single plummy vowel." A detractor of Chastain's performance was Ouzounian, who found it "too relentlessly contemporary" and having "a passion that you just know is going to end badly".

Brady praised the choice of filming location, Castle Coole, "an impeccable neo-classical building, that lends an aura of airlessness and artefact to a work that finds these same flaws in the social order."

Brady and RogerEbert.com's Sheila O'Malley highlighted the cinematography, particularly how it emphasized the closeness of the rooms. Explained O'Mailey, "The claustrophobia of the kitchen is overwhelming in the film, and the shots of Miss Julie wandering through the manor by herself, her posture broken and stiff, her dress falling off her shoulder, give us a welcome (and yet rivetingly disturbing) change of scene."
