= Ondine (film) =

2009 film

- Promotional movie poster for the film
- Directed by: Neil Jordan
- Written by: Neil Jordan
- Produced by: Ben Browning; James Flynn; Neil Jordan
- Starring: Colin Farrell; Alicja Bachleda
- Cinematography: Christopher Doyle
- Edited by: Tony Lawson
- Music by: Kjartan Sveinsson
- Production companies: Wayfare Entertainment; Little Wave; Octagon Films
- Distributed by: Paramount Vantage
- Release dates: 14 September 2009 (TIFF); 5 March 2010 (Ireland)
- Running time: 111 minutes
- Country: Ireland
- Languages: English; French; Romanian
- Budget: $12 million
- Box office: $1.6 million

Ondine is a 2009 Irish romantic drama film written and directed by Neil Jordan and starring Colin Farrell and Alicja Bachleda. The film was shot on location in Castletownbere, and it touches upon the possible existence of the Irish mythological selkie bringing hope and love to humanity.

The film had its North American premiere as part of the Toronto International Film Festival on 14 September 2009 in Toronto and European premiere as part of the Jameson Dublin International Film Festival on 18 February 2010 in Dublin.

== Plot ==
Syracuse, uncomfortably called "Circus" by some, is trawling on his boat and finds a scantily clad young woman caught in his net. He sees she is alive and resuscitates her. She calls herself Ondine and refuses to be taken to the hospital, not wanting to be seen by anyone else. He shelters her in a caravan house that belonged to his late mother in a quiet harbor, which makes him late for picking up his daughter Annie who uses a wheelchair and lives with his ex-wife Maura. During Annie's dialysis, he tells her a story about a fisherman that catches a woman out of the sea. Annie explains the woman could be a magical selkie.

Annie receives a new powerchair from the CRC, and upon returning home is greeted by Maura's boyfriend Alex. Maura flips off Syracuse for missing the doctor who had news on a kidney match for Annie.

Next morning, Syracuse finds Ondine washing clothes in a stream, singing in an unknown language. She follows him on his boat to work that day. He pulls up only empty lobster pots until Ondine starts singing, after which every pot contains a catch. Still not wanting to be seen, Ondine refuses to follow Syracuse to the fish market where the lobsters are sold. He buys a dress and lies to the store clerk that it's for Annie when she grows up.

When Syracuse picks up Annie from her school, he continues the fisherman story by explaining how the woman sings to the fish for him to catch, a song in a language he has never heard before. Annie states that Selk is the language of the selkie. Syracuse stammers that his lobsters hear her sing, which makes Annie curious as to whose story this is, and she secretly follows him to the caravan. When Syracuse asks how long she will stay, Ondine says it is up to him. He happily replies forever and happily ever after, like the fairytale he has been building with Annie, who watches them without being noticed.

Annie is seen back home studying all her new library books on seals and selkies. Alex says selkies are Scottish creatures, but the one Annie saw is not.

Syracuse regularly torments the local priest in confession because there aren't any AA meetings in town. He recalls a recurring nightmare where he is at Alex's funeral and reunited with Maura, still with her drinking problem. As the priest pushes the subject away, Syracuse reveals he pulled a woman out of the water with his net and kept her, reminding the priest he can't tell anyone.

Ondine is shown alone, tidying up the caravan, then tries her new clothing as if the experience was a first, especially when she stretches leggings over one splayed hand so it looks webbed.

The next day, Annie sees Ondine swimming and approaches her on the dock. They bond as Annie tells her about selkies and ostensibly Ondine herself, which Ondine goes along with, kissing Annie goodbye before the child goes back to her mother. Syracuse goes in the library asking for books about selkies, but discovers that Annie took them all. Annie runs into some neighbourhood kids showing off their bicycles and lets one of the kids play with her powerchair before it shorts out driving into water. The kids call Annie a "spaz" and abandon her to push it back home, where she finds Alex drinking beer. As Alex dries out the batteries, Annie asks again about selkies and he tells her they come from his homeland, Outer Hebrides. However, Ondine doesn't speak like him.

Syracuse brings Ondine fishing again to steer the tiller, until a Fisheries board patrol boat zooms by, causing Ondine to hide. She begins singing again as he is pulling up his net, and finds it filled with a bountiful catch of salmon, that doesn't come from trawling. Ondine hides as the patrol boat returns to inspect for prohibited gillnetting; the guards find dry gillnets and Ondine hidden in them. Glad that Ondine isn't invisible and that the guards accepted her story about how the fish were caught, he goes into harbor to sell their catch, where everyone stares at Ondine, including a dark-haired man who is looking for her. Syracuse takes her shopping for clothes and run into Annie, who helps her with outfits, as townfolk gawk through the store window eyeing a very pretty Ondine.

Later Syracuse wants to pick up Annie for local regatta festivities but Maura says she already left. Ondine gets another surprise visit from Annie, and sees the caravan has been cleaned. Learning that Annie can't swim, they both play in the shallow water, where Ondine finds something that Annie thinks is her seal coat, and they bury it in the greenhouse. Annie wants Ondine to stay for seven years, unless the selkie husband claims her back, and shares this with her dad as they all boat into town. Ondine warns Annie that she isn't selk and can't grant wishes. Upset, Annie pretends to have brake failure to throw herself off the pier, to test Ondine's ability to breathe underwater, and Ondine jumps in to her rescue. They bring Annie back to Maura and Alex, who share with Annie that a man was asking for Ondine. This gives Annie a nightmare about the selkie husband coming. Back in the caravan, Syracuse explains he's called Circus the Clown because he was an alcoholic like Maura. He stopped drinking for Annie, yet custody went to her mother.

Back in the confessional, Syracuse tells the priest he sinned with Ondine the night before, and fears the good luck she brings, since he lost hope long ago. As he leaves, the unknown man approaches him about Ondine and Syracuse ignores him. He brings Annie home from dialysis but she is locked out since Maura and Alex are drinking in a pub. Annie asks to be left with them. Syracuse returns to find the caravan has been ransacked, and Ondine hiding nearby. He wants Ondine to stay and asks her to wish the man away, but her only wish is for Annie not to be sick. Ondine's man is searching town, driving with rage, causing an accident with Maura who was drunk driving. Alex is killed, thrown through the windshield. Ondine and Syracuse follow Annie to the hospital, and learn she is getting an immediate kidney transplant from Alex, who opted to be a donor. The man is also brought to the hospital, and asks Ondine why she speaks their language as they both don't belong here.

Syracuse and Maura both get drunk after Alex's wake. Maura wants him to get rid of Ondine, now hiding in his boat, because of bad luck. Intoxicated, Syracuse maroons Ondine at Roancarrig Lighthouse island because he thinks she will haunt him forever, as humans and selkies don't belong together. Dusk comes and some driftwood gives Ondine's basking silhouette the appearance of a seal's tail; she jumps into the sea towards the seals on Seal Rock. The priest wakes up a depressed Syracuse, and he brings Annie from hospital to his home. She comforts him saying Ondine will be back because she left something behind. As Annie watches TV with Sigur Rós performing, Syracuse recognizes they are the songs of Ondine, and goes back to find her on Seal Rock to demand the truth. Ondine first says she is a sea creature that found her seal coat and buried it so she can stay with a family she loves. She then explains that she is a drug mule from Romania, and her pushta Vladic was evading the Coast Guards, when she swam away with a backpack of heroin since Vladic can't swim. She floated in the sea until Syracuse saved her.

Syracuse brings Ondine back to Annie where they are ambushed by Vladic and another gunman, that Annie thinks want the seal coat. Everyone goes to the greenhouse to dig it up, but find nothing because Annie moved it. Ondine promises to stay with Annie, who reveals the bundle was moved to a lobster pot. As they pull up the pot, Annie reminds Ondine that she is a selkie yet Vladic isn't, and Ondine trips Vladic overboard by pulling on the rope he is standing on. He drowns going after the falling lobster pot pushed back in by Annie. Syracuse throws the other Romanian into the water, disarming him and the Romanian is arrested ashore, along with Ondine, who faces deportation. Annie is seen making a confession to the priest who is to wed Syracuse and Ondine, completing the fairytale how selkie women often find unexpected happiness with a landsman.

== Cast ==
- Colin Farrell as Syracuse "Circus"
- Alicja Bachleda as Ondine
- Alison Barry as Annie
- Dervla Kirwan as Maura
- Tony Curran as Alex
- Stephen Rea as Priest
- Emil Hostina as Vladic
- Dashiel Jordan as Kid on Bike (son of the director Neil Jordan)

== Production ==
Filming began on 18 July 2008 on location in Castletownbere, Ireland, and was scheduled to finish on 6 August 2008. Locations seen in the film include Pulleen Harbour, Roancarrigmore Lighthouse, Bantry Bay, Ardnakinna Lighthouse, Bere Island, and Rerrin Village, Bere Island.

The wheelchair seen in the film is the Days Healthcare Escape PWR SE Folding Powerchair. The production went as far as having the chair on a wire safety to save it from falling off the pier into the water.

After meeting on this film, Colin Farrell fathered a child, Henry Tadeusz Farrell (born October 2009), with co-star Alicja Bachleda.

== Release ==
Ondine had its North American premiere as part of the Toronto International Film Festival on 14 September 2009 in Toronto and European premiere as part of the Jameson Dublin International Film Festival on 18 February 2010 in Dublin.

The film was released in Ireland on 5 March 2010, and the United States on 4 June 2010 by Magnolia Pictures.

== Reception ==
Michael O'Sullivan of The Washington Post described the film, "...like a gorgeous contemporary fairy tale..." Noting the film's "spare, dreamlike quality", Betsy Sharkey of the Los Angeles Times, had praise for director of photography Christopher Doyle. "Jordan uses the push and pull between real life and legend to explore ideas of social ills, retribution, justice, family bonds and miracles in an age in which it seems there are none."

Philip Concannon also noted Doyle's "atmospheric cinematography" and Kjartan Sveinsson's "haunting score". He said of Farrell's performance, "It's a lovely piece of acting," but took issue with the shift to realism at the end.

V.A. Musetto of the New York Post found the best performance that of Alison Barry as Annie, but also took exception to the shift from fantasy to reality at the end. Critics have also praised the performances of Colin Farrell, and Alison Barry as Annie, with Mary Pols stating: "Barry is such a relaxed and strong performer that she manages to shrug off the burden of Annie's precociousness."

Rotten Tomatoes gives it a score of 70% based on 103 reviews, with an average score of 6.3/10. The site's consensus reads, "Flawed but charming, Ondine reaffirms writer-director Neil Jordan's gift for myth, magic, and wonder."

=== Accolades ===
The Irish Film and Television Awards for Ondine (Octagon Films), 20 February 2010:

- Actor in a Lead Role: Film: Colin Farrell
- Supporting Actress in a Film: Dervla Kirwan
- Production Design: Anna Rackard
- Sound: Brendan Deasy, Tom Johnson & Sarah Gaines

== Music ==
Music from Icelandic group Sigur Rós and Irish singer/songwriter Lisa Hannigan is featured in the film.
