= Tigerland =

2000 film directed by Joel Schumacher

- Film poster
- Directed by: Joel Schumacher
- Written by: Ross Klavan; Michael McGruther
- Produced by: Arnon Milchan; Steven Haft; Beau Flynn
- Starring: Colin Farrell; Matthew Davis; Shea Whigham; Clifton Collins Jr.; Russell Richardson; Thomas Guiry; Cole Hauser
- Cinematography: Matthew Libatique
- Edited by: Mark Stevens
- Music by: Nathan Larson
- Production companies: Regency Enterprises; Haft Entertainment; New Regency
- Distributed by: 20th Century Fox
- Release dates: September 2000 (Toronto); October 6, 2000 (United States)
- Running time: 101 minutes
- Country: United States
- Language: English
- Budget: $10 million
- Box office: $148,701

Tigerland is a 2000 American war drama film directed by Joel Schumacher and starring Colin Farrell. It takes place in a training camp for soldiers to be sent to the Vietnam War.

The film premiered at the 2000 Toronto International Film Festival in September 2000 before being released by 20th Century Fox on October 6, 2000. Despite receiving generally positive reviews for its story, direction, Farrell's performance, screenplay, and emotional weight, the film was a box-office bomb, grossing only $148,701 worldwide against a $10 million budget. It was one of Schumacher's best reviewed films in his filmography.

== Plot ==
In September 1971, the United States is losing the Vietnam War. Roland Bozz, a draftee opposed to the war, is an unruly soldier who disrespects authority. He befriends another Army recruit, Jim Paxton, an aspiring writer who records his experiences in a journal. Unlike Bozz, Paxton volunteered. Upon reaching their post, company commanding officer Captain Saunders explains that every soldier who passes through Fort Polk will be sent to Vietnam, and that any political views on the war are irrelevant.

Having "X-ray vision for loopholes", Bozz finds ways for soldiers to get out of the army — one, Cantwell, because he not only has children but also a disabled wife; another, Miter, had joined to prove his manhood but finds himself overwhelmed. Eventually Bozz's natural leadership and ability earn him the title of platoon guide. Another private, Wilson, a racial bigot and instigator, continuously demeans Miter and Bozz. Bozz fights and easily beats Wilson, earning Wilson's hatred.

Later, during live fire exercises, Wilson threatens Bozz with a pistol. Bozz tries to disarm Wilson, and the two wrestle each other to the ground, with Wilson prevailing. He puts the gun to the back of Bozz's head and pulls the trigger, but the gun misfires. Saunders lets Bozz choose the punishment: have Wilson court-martialed or "let me deal with him", strongly suggesting the latter. Bozz says he wants Wilson "out of the Army", because he recognizes Wilson has emotionally suffered ever since his inability to command became obvious.

The platoon is sent to "Tigerland", a forested training area designed as a replica of Vietnam. During an exercise, Bozz's squad acts as villagers in a mock Vietnamese village, with one squad member designated as a Viet Cong sympathizer. They compete with another squad charged with rooting out the sympathizer, led by Wilson, who was ultimately spared. As the exercise ends with Bozz's squad "winning", Wilson tells Bozz he will kill him no matter what it takes. Soon thereafter, Bozz plans to escape to Mexico with the aid of some civilians he has paid. Platoon member Johnson tells him if he runs away, Wilson will kill Paxton instead. Bozz remains.

During the last training exercise, the two squads are pitted against each other on patrolling missions. As Wilson's squad prepares for an attack, he replaces his blank cartridges with live ammunition and removes his blank-firing adaptor. As Bozz's squad nears, he opens fire. Though he does not hit anyone, he is obviously using live ammunition, and the trainer for the exercise tries to intervene. As he does, Bozz is standing above Paxton and deliberately fires a blank round with his rifle muzzle near Paxton's face, the flash wounding Paxton's eye. The trainer aims a pistol at Wilson's head to get him to hold his weapon up and surrender, telling him he will be court-martialed.

The platoon prepares to head to Vietnam, except for Paxton, whose eye injury, though temporary, has earned him a medical discharge. Bozz and Paxton exchange farewells. Paxton tells Bozz he is going to write about him, but Bozz says he will not. He has stolen Paxton's journal and rips out pages as the platoon's bus drives off, leaving Paxton scrambling to recover them. Bozz tosses the journal as the bus speeds away.

In the closing narration, Paxton says he never saw Bozz again. Over time, he heard from various sources that Bozz either died in Vietnam or disappeared over there. One acquaintance told Paxton he thought he'd seen Bozz, years after the war, in Mexico with a beautiful woman.

== Cast ==
- Colin Farrell as Private Roland Bozz
- Matthew Davis as Private Jim Paxton
- Clifton Collins Jr. as Private Miter
- Tom Guiry as Private Cantwell
- Shea Whigham as Private Wilson
- Russell Richardson as Private Johnson
- Cole Hauser as Staff Sergeant Cota
- Neil Brown Jr. as Private Jamoa Kearns
- Tory Kittles as Private Ryan
- Nick Searcy as Captain Saunders
- Afemo Omilami as Sergeant First Class Ezra Landers
- Matt Gerald as Sergeant Eveland
- Michael Shannon as Sergeant Filmore
- James Macdonald as Staff Sergeant Thomas
- Arian Ash as Sheri
- Haven Gaston as Claudia

== Production ==
Tigerland was the name of a U.S. Army training camp during the mid-1960s to early 1970s, located at Fort Polk, Louisiana as part of the U.S. Army Advanced Infantry Training Center. The humid and muggy climate of Fort Polk was intended to prepare recruits for the similar environmental conditions of South Vietnam. Although based on Fort Polk, the location at Camp Blanding in Florida was used instead. The film was shot using handheld 16mm cameras, cinematography by Matthew Libatique.

== Reception ==
The film had a box office gross of $148,701 worldwide against a US$10 million budget. Tigerland received positive reviews from critics and has a rating of 77% on Rotten Tomatoes based on 47 reviews with an average score of 6.98 out of 10. The consensus states "A great cast and the gritty feel of the film help elevate Tigerland above the familiarity of the subject matter." On Metacritic the film has a weighted average score of 55 out of 100 based on 14 reviews.
