= 1st Irish Film & Television Awards =

2003 Irish film and television awards ceremony

- Date: 1 November 2003
- Site: Burlington Hotel, Dublin
- Hosted by: James Nesbitt

Highlights
- Best Film: Intermission
- Best Actor: Andrew Scott; Dead Bodies
- Best Actress: Angeline Ball; Bloom
- Most awards: Intermission (4)
- Most nominations: Intermission (12)

The 1st Annual Irish Film & Television Awards was hosted by James Nesbitt on 1 November 2003, honouring Irish film and television released in 2003.

== Awards in film ==
Best Irish Film Jury Award

- Intermission (Winner)
  - The Actors
  - Chávez: Inside the Coup
  - Dead Bodies
  - Song for a Raggy Boy
  - Veronica Guerin

Best Film Director

- John Crowley for Intermission (Winner)
  - John Deery for Conspiracy of Silence
  - Robert Quinn for Dead Bodies
  - Liz Gill for Goldfish Memory
  - Aisling Walsh for Song for a Raggy Boy

Best Short Film

- Meeting Che Guevara and the Man from Maybury Hill (Winner)
  - Eireville
  - The Last Time
  - No, No, No
  - Strangers in the Night

== Awards in acting ==
Best Actor in a Lead Role – Film (Jury Award)

- Andrew Scott for Dead Bodies (Winner)
  - Colin Farrell for SWAT
  - Michael McElhatton for Spin the Bottle
  - Cillian Murphy for 28 Days Later
  - Aidan Quinn for Song for a Raggy Boy

Best Actor in a Leading Role – Television

- James Nesbitt for Murphy's Law (Winner)
  - Peadar Cox for Ros na Rún
  - Simon Delaney for Bachelors Walk
  - Ciarán McMenamin for Any Time Now

Best Actor in a Supporting Role – Film/TV

- David Wilmot for Intermission (Winner)
  - Colin Farrell for Intermission
  - Ciarán Hinds for Veronica Guerin
  - Gerard McSorley for Veronica Guerin
  - Owen Roe for Any Time Now

Best Actress in a Lead Role – Film

- Angeline Ball for Bloom (Winner)
  - Bronagh Gallagher for Spin the Bottle
  - Maria Doyle Kennedy for Mystics
  - Flora Montgomery for Goldfish Memory
  - Natascha McElhone for Solaris

Best Actress in a Leading Role – Television

- Angeline Ball for Any Time Now (Winner)
  - Dearbhla Molloy for Home for Christmas
  - Joan Sheehy for Ros na Rún

Best Actress in a Supporting Role – Film/TV

- Ruth McCabe for Any Time Now (Winner)
  - Brenda Fricker for Veronica Guerin
  - Fiona Glascott for Goldfish Memory
  - Deirdre O'Kane for Intermission
  - Ger Ryan for Intermission

== Awards in television ==
Best TV Drama

- Bachelors Walk (Winner)
  - Any Time Now
  - Home for Christmas
  - On Home Ground
  - Watermelon

Best Entertainment

- Amu Amigos "Amazon" (Winner)
  - Brian Kennedy on Song
  - Only Fools Buy Horses
  - Ryan Confidential – Colin Farrell
  - The Late Late Show special on Richard Harris

Best Lifestyle

- Amu Amigos "Amazon" (Winner)
  - Ask Anna
  - The Health Squad
  - Ireland AM
  - Wedding Planners

Best Children's/Youth/Educational/Multicultural/Religious/Regional TV

- Sampler (Winner)
  - Cracking Crime
  - Ear to the Ground
  - Townlands: "Animal Rescue"
  - Twins

Best Sports TV

- The Rod Squad (Winner)
  - Breaking Ball
  - End to End: "Armagh Special"
  - La Ochra Gael
  - When Joe Met Sam

Best Current Affairs

- Prime Time: "Cardinal Secrets" (Winner)
  - Prime Time: "Saturday Night Sunday Morning"
  - Crash
  - Prime Time: "Sue Nation"
  - Fine Gael: "A Family at War"

== Awards across TV and film ==
Best Documentary

- Oileán Thoraí (Winner)
  - A House Divided
  - Bang! You're Dead
  - Chavez - Inside the Coup
  - Living the Revolution
  - Sing on Forever
  - The Strange Case of the Irish Crown Jewels

Best Irish Language

- Amu Amigos "Amazon" (Winner)
  - An Charraig Stoite
  - Galtymore
  - Islandman
  - Oilean Thorai

Best Music in TV/Film

- John McPhillips for Spin the Bottle (Winner)
  - Gavin Little for God's Kitchen
  - Ronan Johnstone for Home for Christmas
  - Niall Byrne for On Home Ground
  - ShinAwil Productions for You're A Star

Best Animation

- Escape (Winner)
  - The Birth of John the Baptist
  - The Butterfly Collector
  - The Depository
  - Pullin' the Devil by the Tail

Best Script

- Mark O'Rowe for Intermission (Winner)
  - Conor McPherson for The Actors
  - Derek Landy for Dead Bodies
  - Liz Gill for Goldfish Memory
  - Ian Fitzgibbon for Spin the Bottle

Best Cinematography / TV Photography

- Peter Robertson for Song for a Raggy Boy (Winner)
  - Ciarán Tanham for Bloom
  - Donal Gilligan for Dead Bodies
  - Ken Byrne for Goldfish Memory
  - Brendan Galvin for Veronica Guerin

Best Editing

- Dermot Diskin for Dead Bodies (Winner)
  - The Actors
  - Goldfish Memory
  - Spin the Bottle
  - The Strange Case of the Irish Crown Jewels

Best Hair / Make-up

- Linda Mooney & Carol Dunne for Watermelon (Winner)
  - Lynn Johnston & Lorraine Glynn for Intermission
  - Patsy Giles for Spin the Bottle
  - Dee Corcoran & Ailbhe Lemass for Veronica Guerin

Best Costume Design

- Kathy Strachan for Spin the Bottle (Winner)
  - Tara Van Zyl for Bloom
  - Lorna Marie Mugan for Intermission
  - Joan Bergin for Veronica Guerin
  - Eimer Ní Mhaoldomhnaigh for Watermelon

Best Art Direction

- Padraig O'Neill for Spin the Bottle (Winner)
  - God's Kitchen for Paki Smith
  - Laurent Mellet for Headrush
  - Mark Geraghty for Home for Christmas
  - Tom Conroy for Intermission

Best Sound / Sound Editing

- Daniel Birch for Dead Bodies (Winner)
  - Sarah Gaines & Philippe Faujas for Goldfish Memory
  - Paddy Gibbons for The Twilight Hour

Best New Talent

- Colin O'Donoghue for Home for Christmas (Winner)
  - Jonathan Forbes for Conspiracy of Silence
  - Sonya Supple Gildea for Bodyblow
  - Ian Thullier for Darkroom
  - Sean Walsh for Bloom
  - David Wilmot for Intermission

== People's Choice Awards ==
Best Actor in a Film – Public Vote

- Colin Farrell (Winner)
  - Aidan Quinn
  - Stuart Townsend
  - Cillian Murphy
  - Pierce Brosnan

UGC Cinemas Best Irish Film – Public Vote

- Veronica Guerin (Winner)
  - Evelyn
  - Goldfish Memory
  - The Actors
  - Intermission

Best TV Personality – Public Vote

- Miriam O'Callaghan (Winner)
  - Patrick Kielty
  - Grainne Seoige
  - Julian Simmons
  - Paidi O'Lionard
  - Hector O'hEochagain
  - John Daly
  - Gerry Kelly

== Lifetime achievement award ==
- Awarded to Neil Jordan
