= IFTA Award for Best Lead Actor – Film =

Irish film industry award

IFTA Award for Lead Actor – Film
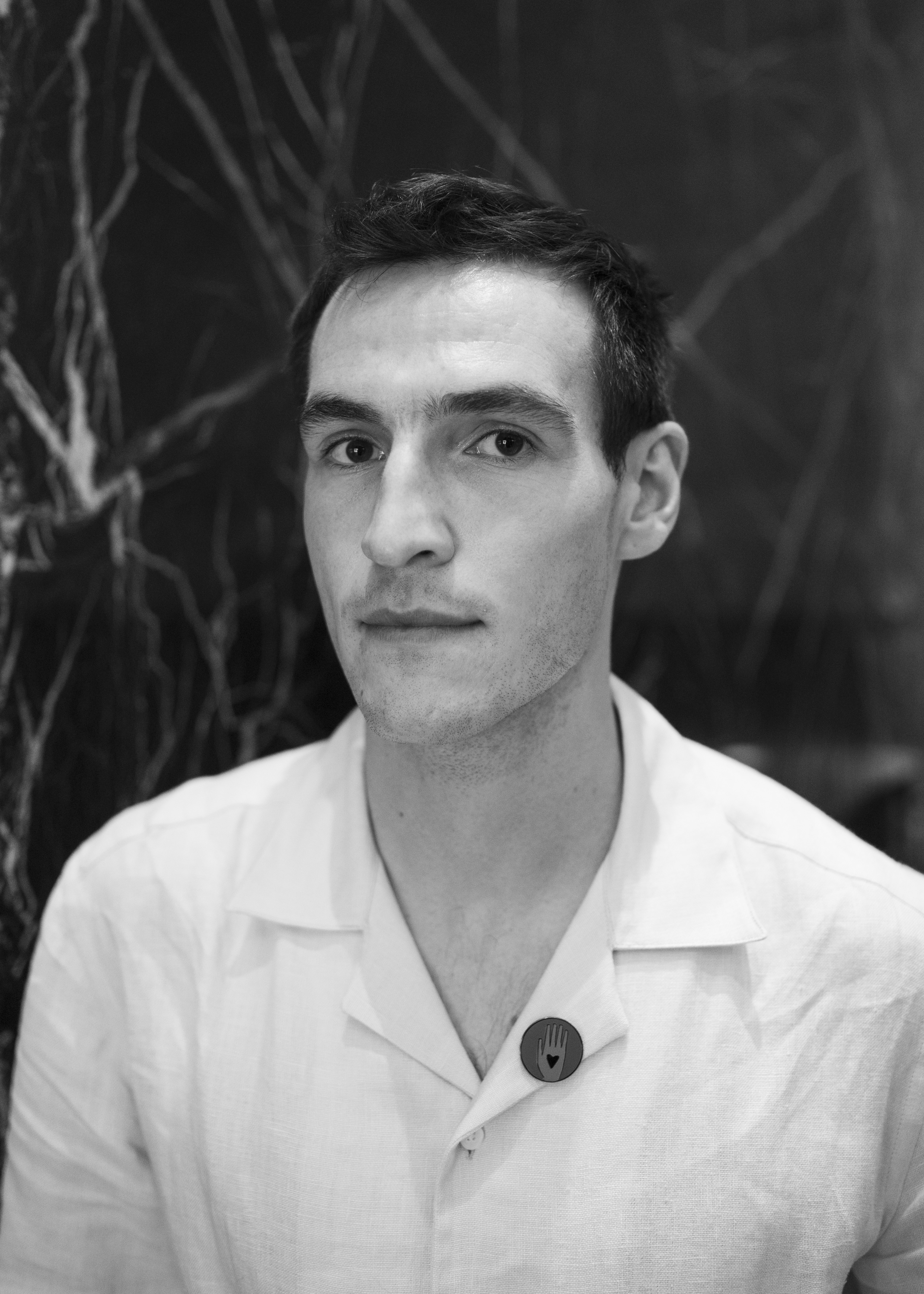
- The 2025 recipient: Éanna Hardwicke
- Awarded for: Best Performance by an Actor in a Leading Role
- Country: Ireland
- Presented by: Irish Film & Television Academy (IFTA)
- First award: 2003
- Most recent winner: Éanna Hardwicke, Saipan (2026)
- Website: ifta.ie

The IFTA Award for Lead Actor – Film is an award presented annually by the Irish Film & Television Academy (IFTA). It has been presented since the 1st Irish Film & Television Awards ceremony in 2003 to an Irish actor who has delivered an outstanding performance in a leading role in a feature film.

The record for most wins is three, held by both Cillian Murphy and Michael Fassbender, while Moe Dunford has won the award twice. The record for most nominations is eleven, held by Colin Farrell, who has won the award once. Ciarán Hinds has the most nominations without winning, with four. Éanna Hardwicke is the award's most recent winner, for Saipan (2025).

== Eligibility ==
The award is exclusively open to Irish actors; there is a separate International award for non-Irish actors. The rules define an Irish person as follows:

- Born in Ireland (32 counties) or
- Have Irish Citizenship or
- Be full-time resident in Ireland (minimum of 3 years)

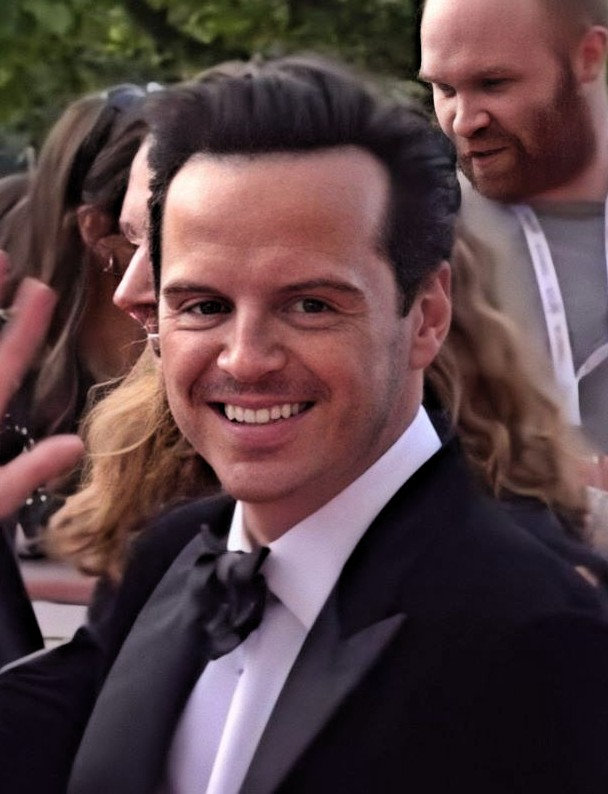
Andrew Scott was the award's first winner, for Dead Bodies (2003).

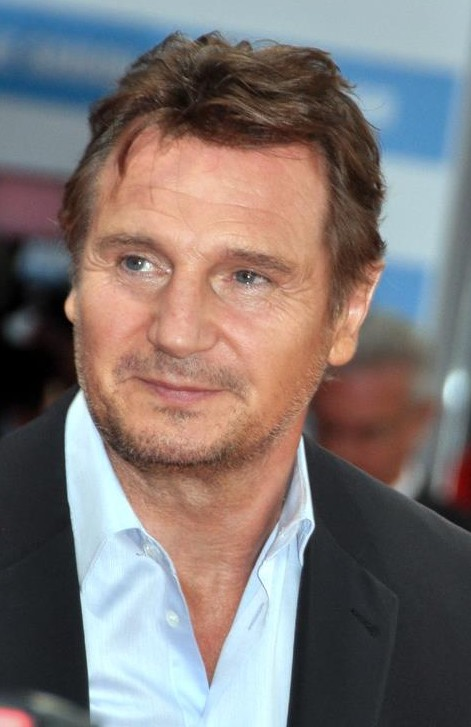
Liam Neeson won for Kinsey (2004).

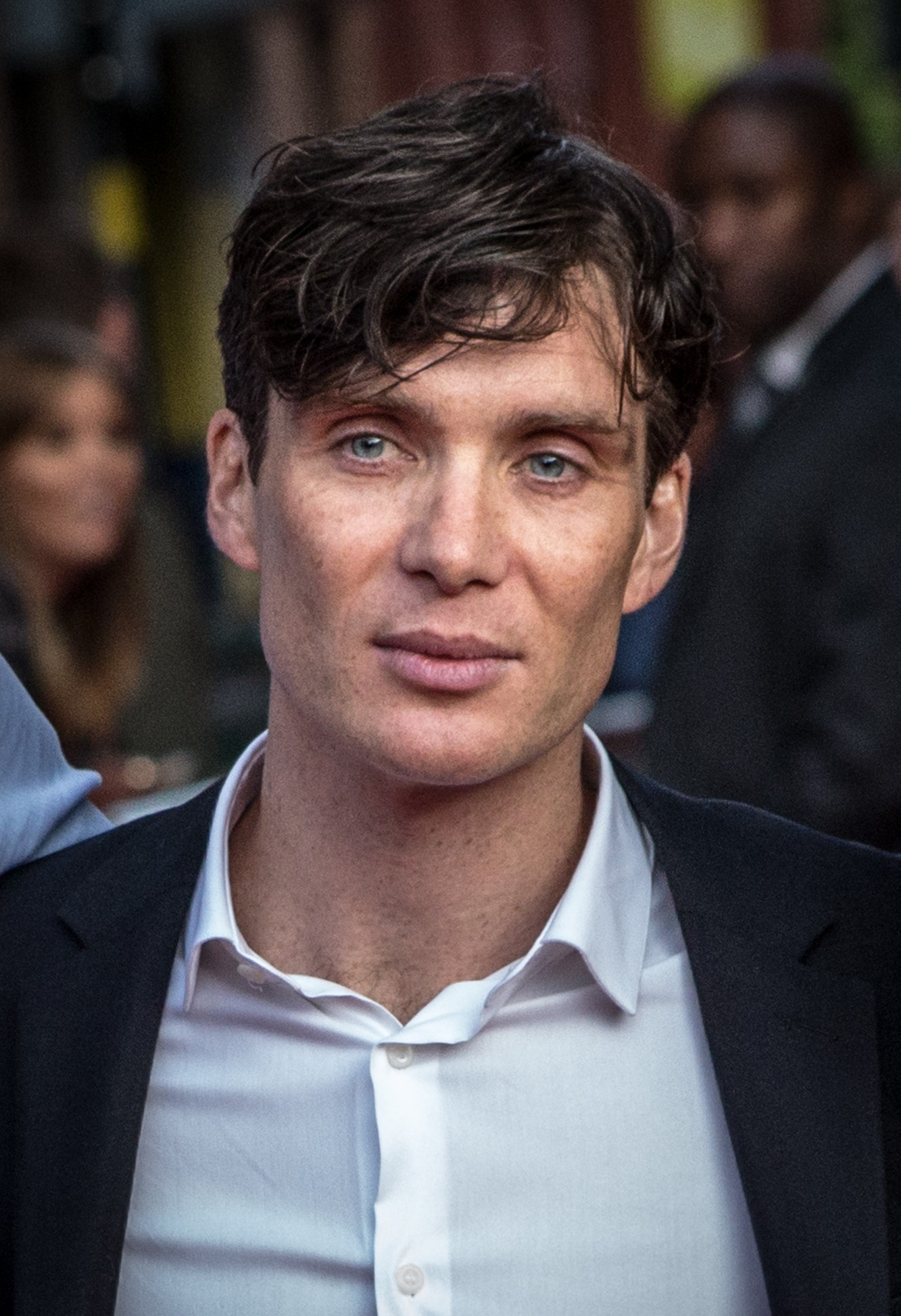
Cillian Murphy won thrice, for Breakfast on Pluto (2005), Oppenheimer (2023) and Small Things Like These (2024).

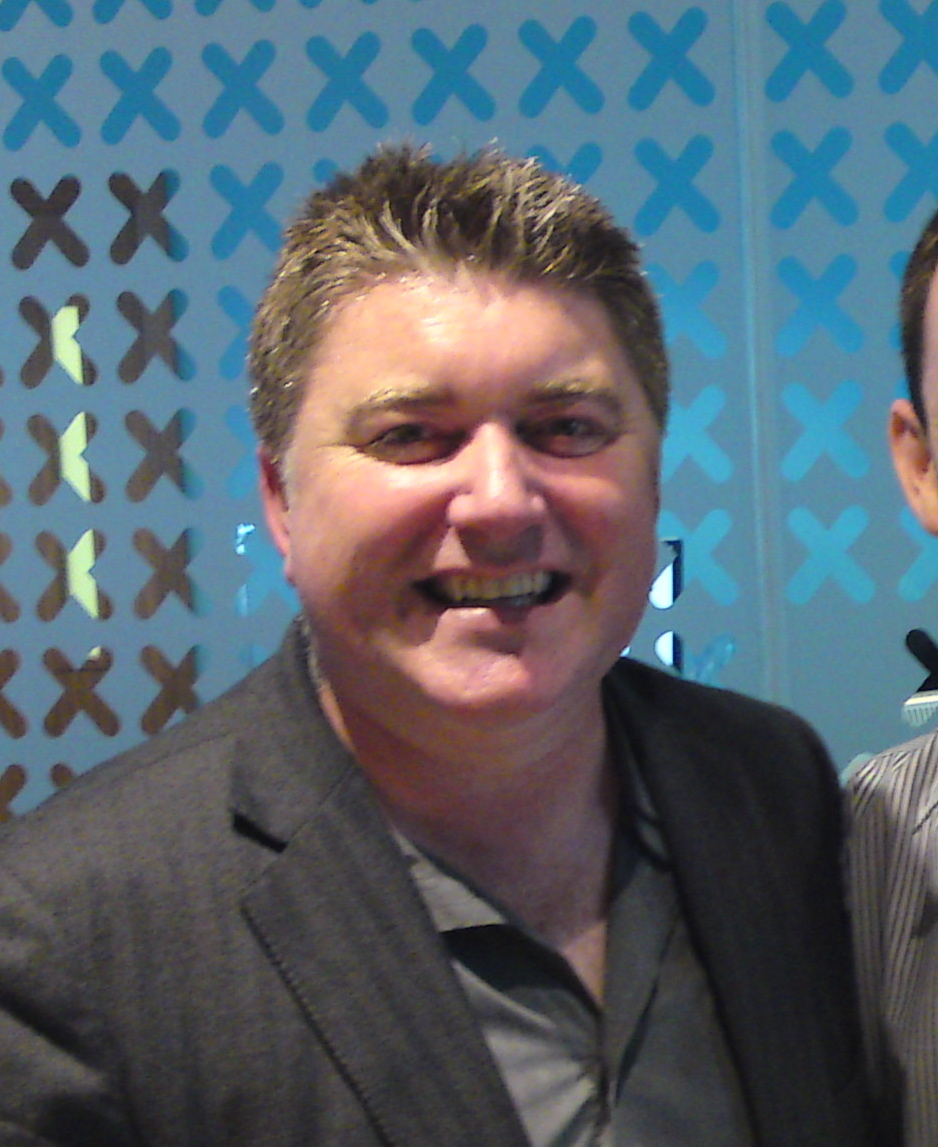
Pat Shortt won for Garage (2007).

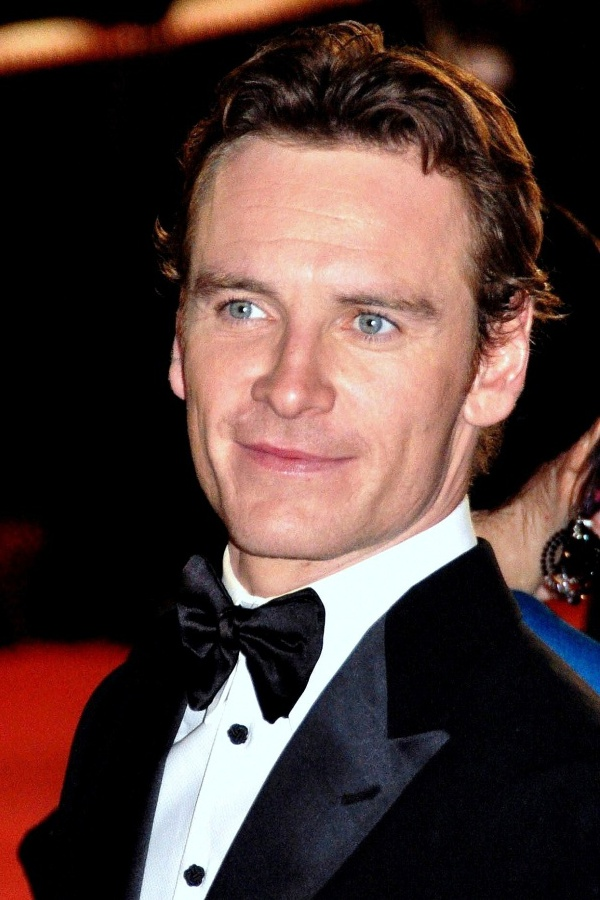
Michael Fassbender won thrice, for Hunger (2008), Shame (2011), and Steve Jobs (2015).

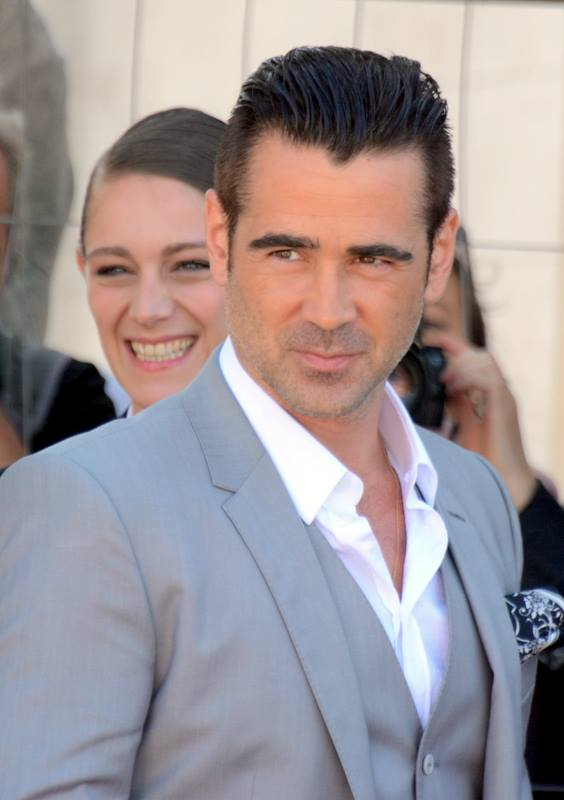
Colin Farrell won for Ondine (2009).

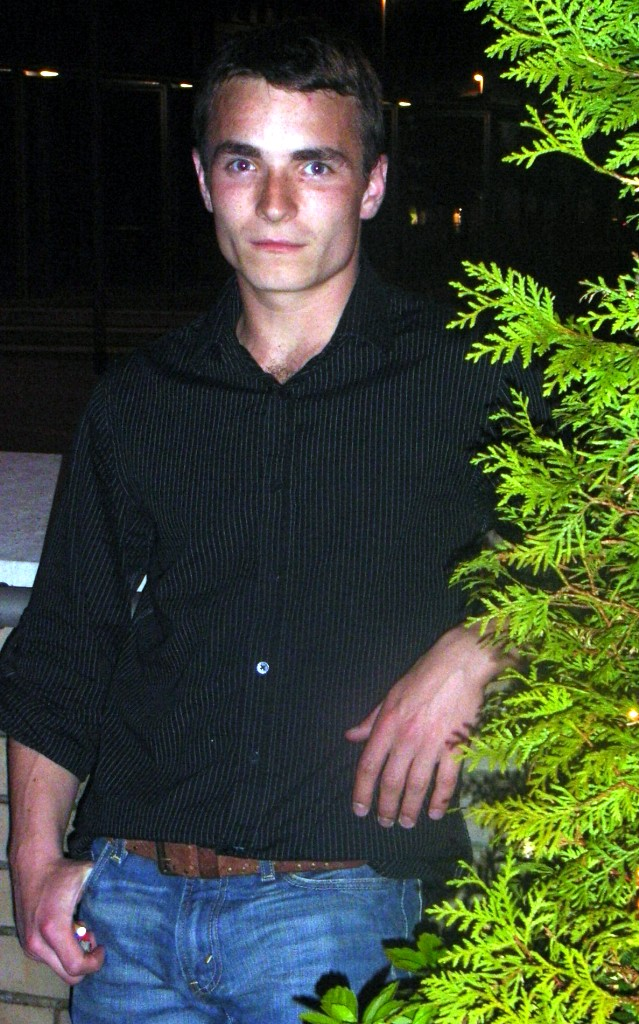
Martin McCann won for Swansong: Story of Occi Byrne (2009).

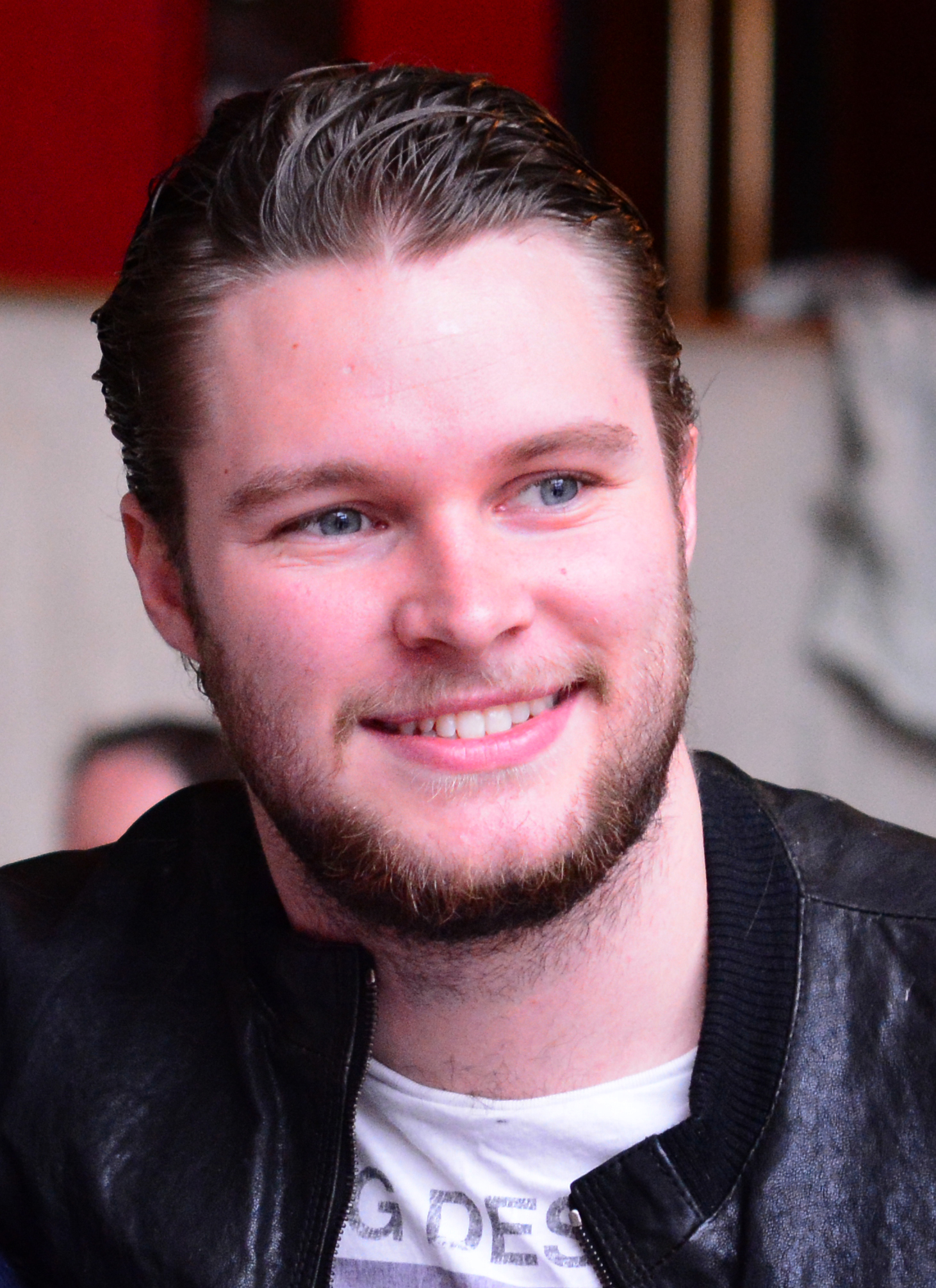
Jack Reynor won for What Richard Did (2012).

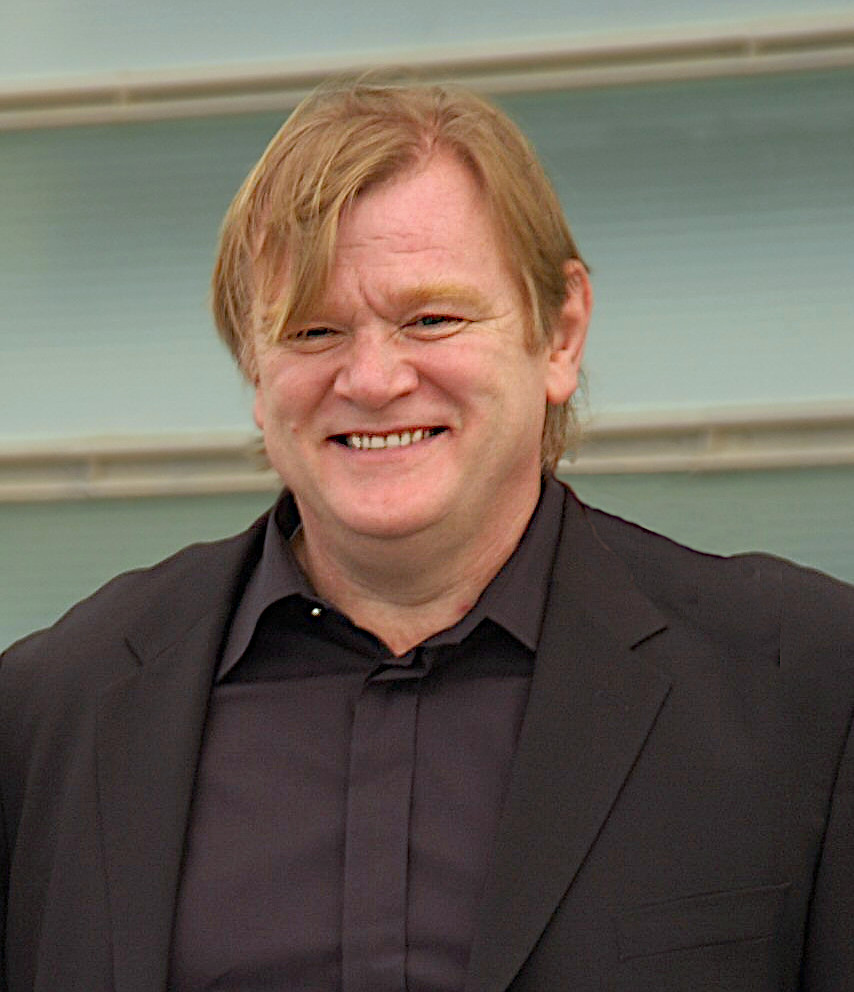
Brendan Gleeson won for Calvary (2014).

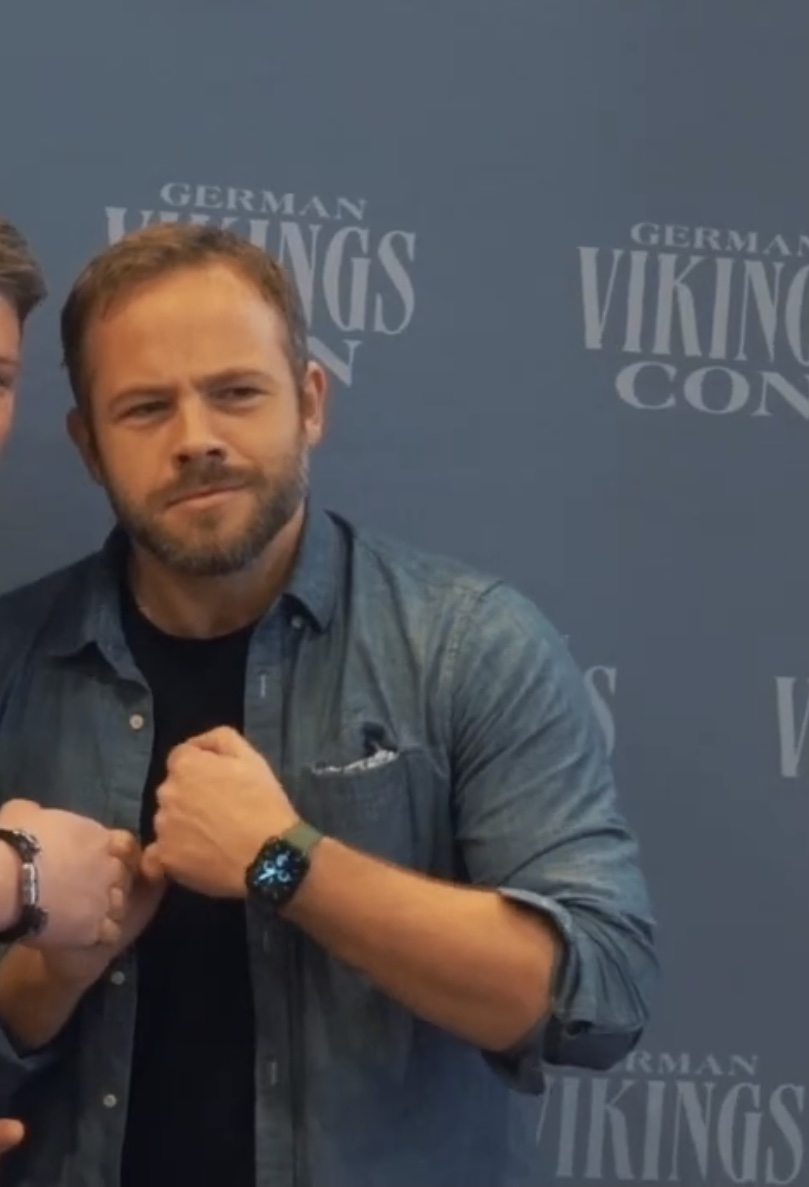
Moe Dunford won twice, for Patrick's Day (2014) and Nightride (2021).

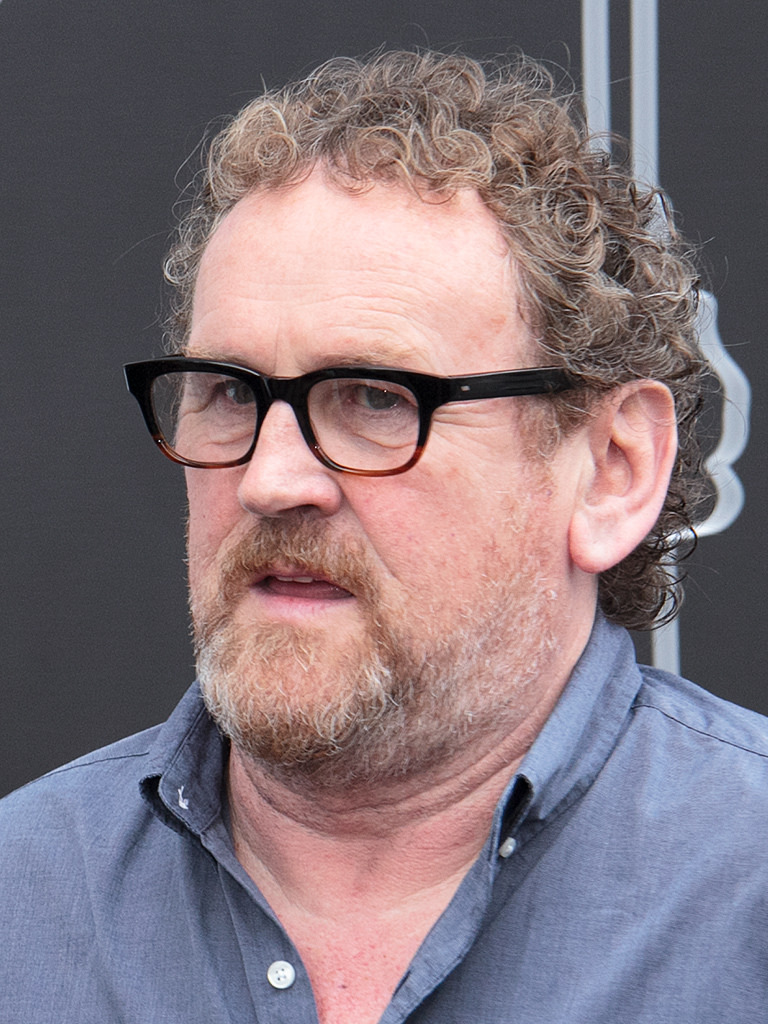
Colm Meaney won for The Journey (2016).

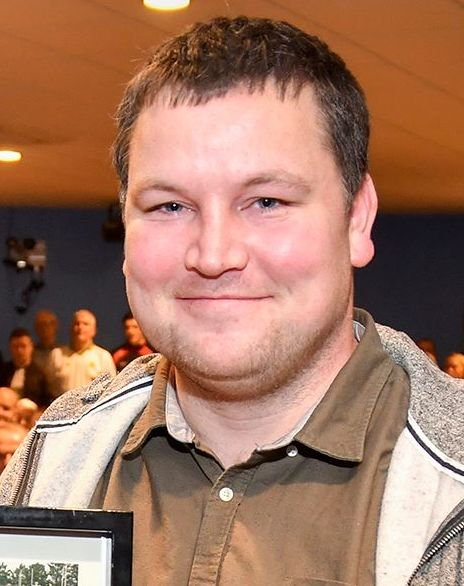
John Connors won for Cardboard Gangsters (2017).

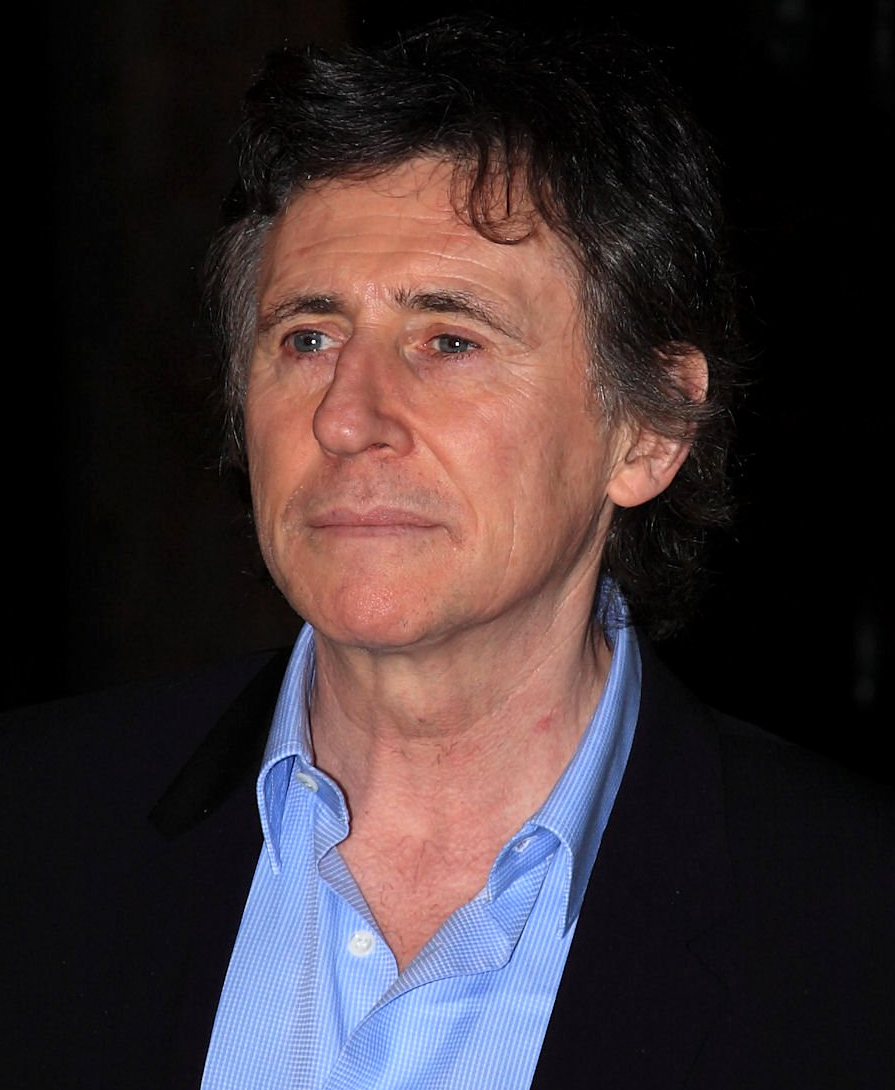
Gabriel Byrne won for Death of a Ladies' Man (2020).

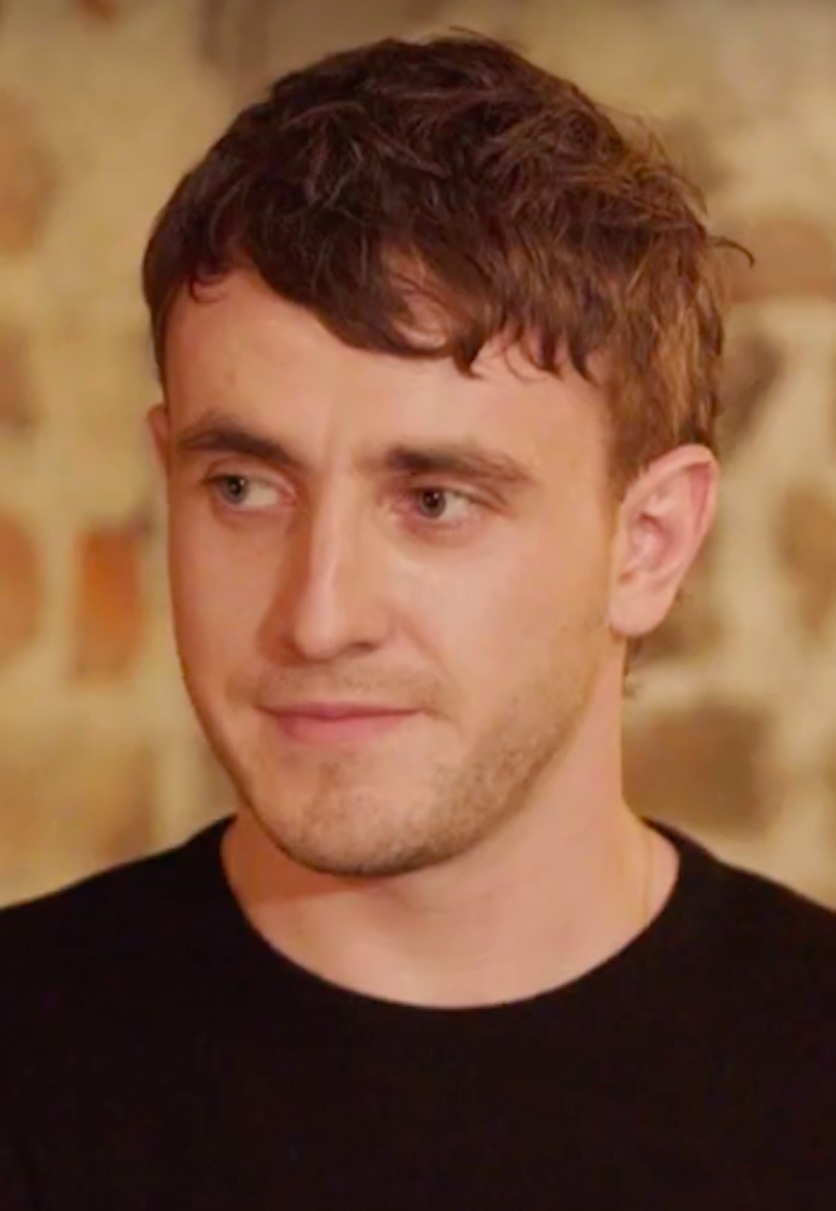
Paul Mescal won for Aftersun (2022).

== Winners and nominees ==
In the following table, the years are listed as the year of film. The first three ceremonies were held at the end of the year, but since the 4th Irish Film & Television Awards the ceremonies have generally been held the following year. As there was no ceremony in 2019, the 16th Irish Film & Television Awards covered a period of two years.

Table key
| ‡ | Indicates the winner |

=== 2000s ===
| Year | Actor | Film | Ref. |
|---|---|---|---|
| 2003 (1st) | Andrew Scott ‡ | Dead Bodies | |
| 2003 (1st) | Colin Farrell | SWAT | |
| 2003 (1st) | Michael McElhatton | Spin the Bottle | |
| 2003 (1st) | Cillian Murphy | 28 Days Later | |
| 2003 (1st) | Aidan Quinn | Song for a Raggy Boy | |
| 2004 (2nd) | Gerard McSorley ‡ | Omagh | |
| 2004 (2nd) | Colin Farrell | A Home at the End of the World | |
| 2004 (2nd) | Tom Murphy | Adam & Paul | |
| 2004 (2nd) | Stephen Rea | The Halo Effect | |
| 2004 (2nd) | Karl Shiels | Capital Letters | |
| 2005 (3rd) | Liam Neeson ‡ | Kinsey | |
| 2005 (3rd) | Gabriel Byrne | Wah-Wah | |
| 2005 (3rd) | Cillian Murphy | Red Eye | |
| 2005 (3rd) | Aidan Quinn | Return to Sender | |
| 2006 (4th) | Cillian Murphy ‡ | Breakfast on Pluto | |
| 2006 (4th) | Pierce Brosnan | The Matador | |
| 2006 (4th) | Colin Farrell | Miami Vice | |
| 2006 (4th) | Brendan Gleeson | Studs | |
| 2006 (4th) | Cillian Murphy | The Wind That Shakes the Barley | |
| 2007 (5th) | Pat Shortt ‡ | Garage | |
| 2007 (5th) | Gabriel Byrne | Jindabyne | |
| 2007 (5th) | Colm Meaney | Kings | |
| 2007 (5th) | Cillian Murphy | Sunshine | |
| 2007 (5th) | Hugh O'Conor | Eastern Promises | |
| 2008 (6th) | Michael Fassbender ‡ | Hunger | |
| 2008 (6th) | Colin Farrell | In Bruges | |
| 2008 (6th) | Brendan Gleeson | In Bruges | |
| 2008 (6th) | Dylan Moran | A Film with Me in It | |
| 2009 (7th) | Colin Farrell ‡ | Ondine | |
| 2009 (7th) | Ciarán Hinds | The Eclipse | |
| 2009 (7th) | Darren Healy | Savage | |
| 2009 (7th) | Stephen Rea | Nothing Personal | |

=== 2010s ===
| Year | Actor | Film | Ref. |
|---|---|---|---|
| 2010 (8th) | Martin McCann ‡ | Swansong: Story of Occi Byrne | |
| 2010 (8th) | Colm Meaney | Parked | |
| 2010 (8th) | Cillian Murphy | Perrier's Bounty | |
| 2010 (8th) | Liam Neeson | Chloe | |
| 2011 (9th) | Michael Fassbender ‡ | Shame | |
| 2011 (9th) | Brendan Gleeson | The Guard | |
| 2011 (9th) | Ciarán Hinds | Tinker Tailor Soldier Spy | |
| 2011 (9th) | Martin Sheen | Stella Days | |
| 2012 (10th) | Jack Reynor ‡ | What Richard Did | |
| 2012 (10th) | Richard Dormer | Good Vibrations | |
| 2012 (10th) | Colin Farrell | Seven Psychopaths | |
| 2012 (10th) | Martin McCann | Jump | |
| 2013 (11th) | Brendan Gleeson ‡ | Calvary | |
| 2013 (11th) | Domhnall Gleeson | About Time | |
| 2013 (11th) | Ciarán Hinds | The Sea | |
| 2013 (11th) | Andrew Scott | The Stag | |
| 2014 (12th) | Moe Dunford ‡ | Patrick's Day | |
| 2014 (12th) | Colin Farrell | Miss Julie | |
| 2014 (12th) | Michael Fassbender | Frank | |
| 2014 (12th) | Jack Reynor | Glassland | |
| 2015 (13th) | Michael Fassbender ‡ | Steve Jobs | |
| 2015 (13th) | Colin Farrell | The Lobster | |
| 2015 (13th) | Domhnall Gleeson | Ex Machina | |
| 2015 (13th) | Barry Keoghan | Mammal | |
| 2015 (13th) | Martin McCann | The Survivalist | |
| 2016 (14th) | Colm Meaney ‡ | The Journey | |
| 2016 (14th) | Jamie Dornan | The Siege of Jadotville | |
| 2016 (14th) | Michael Fassbender | The Light Between Oceans | |
| 2016 (14th) | Alex Murphy | The Young Offenders | |
| 2016 (14th) | Mark O'Halloran | History's Future | |
| 2017 (15th) | John Connors ‡ | Cardboard Gangsters | |
| 2017 (15th) | Colin Farrell | The Killing of a Sacred Deer | |
| 2017 (15th) | Dafhyd Flynn | Michael Inside | |
| 2017 (15th) | Fionn O'Shea | Handsome Devil | |
| 2017 (15th) | Tom Vaughan-Lawlor | Maze | |
| 2018/19 (16th) | Tom Vaughan-Lawlor ‡ | Rialto | |
| 2018/19 (16th) | Dara Devaney | Finky | |
| 2018/19 (16th) | Moe Dunford | The Dig | |
| 2018/19 (16th) | Liam Neeson | Ordinary Love | |
| 2018/19 (16th) | Dónall Ó Héalai | Arracht | |
| 2018/19 (16th) | Barry Ward | Extra Ordinary | |

=== 2020s ===
| Year | Actor | Film | Ref. |
|---|---|---|---|
| 2020/21 (17th) | Gabriel Byrne ‡ | Death of a Ladies' Man | |
| 2020/21 (17th) | Ciarán Hinds | The Man in the Hat | |
| 2020/21 (17th) | Fionn O'Shea | Dating Amber | |
| 2020/21 (17th) | Moe Dunford | Knuckledust | |
| 2020/21 (17th) | Tristan Heanue | Broken Law | |
| 2021/22 (18th) | Moe Dunford ‡ | Nightride | |
| 2021/22 (18th) | Peter Coonan | Doineann | |
| 2021/22 (18th) | Jude Hill | Belfast | |
| 2021/22 (18th) | Aaron Monaghan | Redemption of a Rogue | |
| 2021/22 (18th) | Dónall Ó Héalai | Foscadh | |
| 2022/23 (19th) | Paul Mescal ‡ | Aftersun | |
| 2022/23 (19th) | Colin Farrell | The Banshees of Inisherin | |
| 2022/23 (19th) | Éanna Hardwicke | Lakelands | |
| 2022/23 (19th) | Daryl McCormack | Good Luck to You, Leo Grande | |
| 2022/23 (19th) | Liam Neeson | Marlowe | |
| 2022/23 (19th) | Ollie West | The Sparrow | |
| 2023 (20th) | Cillian Murphy ‡ | Oppenheimer | |
| 2023 (20th) | Pierce Brosnan | The Last Rifleman | |
| 2023 (20th) | Barry Keoghan | Saltburn | |
| 2023 (20th) | Andrew Scott | All of Us Strangers | |
| 2023 (20th) | Barry Ward | That They May Face the Rising Sun | |
| 2023 (20th) | David Wilmot | Lies We Tell | |
| 2024 (21st) | Cillian Murphy ‡ | Small Things Like These | |
| 2024 (21st) | Peter Coonan | King Frankie | |
| 2024 (21st) | Paul Mescal | Gladiator II | |
| 2024 (21st) | Naoise Ó Cairealláin | Kneecap | |
| 2024 (21st) | JJ Ó Dochartaigh | Kneecap | |
| 2024 (21st) | Liam Óg Ó hAnnaidh | Kneecap | |
| 2025 (22nd) | Éanna Hardwicke ‡ | Saipan | |
| 2025 (22nd) | Daniel Day-Lewis | Anemone | |
| 2025 (22nd) | Colin Farrell | Ballad of a Small Player | |
| 2025 (22nd) | Steve Coogan | Saipan | |
| 2025 (22nd) | Cillian Murphy | Steve | |
| 2025 (22nd) | Daniel Power | Christy | |

== Multiple awards and nominations ==
The following individuals have received two or more Lead Actor awards:

| Wins | Actor | Nominations |
|---|---|---|
| 3 | Cillian Murphy | 9 |
| 3 | Michael Fassbender | 5 |
| 2 | Moe Dunford | 4 |

The following individuals have received two or more Lead Actor nominations:

| Nominations | Actor |
|---|---|
| 11 | Colin Farrell |
| 9 | Cillian Murphy |
| 5 | Michael Fassbender |
| 4 | Moe Dunford |
| 4 | Brendan Gleeson |
| 4 | Ciarán Hinds |
| 4 | Liam Neeson |
| 3 | Gabriel Byrne |
| 3 | Martin McCann |
| 3 | Colm Meaney |
| 3 | Andrew Scott |
| 2 | Pierce Brosnan |
| 2 | Peter Coonan |
| 2 | Domhnall Gleeson |
| 2 | Éanna Hardwicke |
| 2 | Barry Keoghan |
| 2 | Paul Mescal |
| 2 | Dónall Ó Héalai |
| 2 | Fionn O'Shea |
| 2 | Aidan Quinn |
| 2 | Stephen Rea |
| 2 | Jack Reynor |
| 2 | Tom Vaughan-Lawlor |
| 2 | Barry Ward |
