= Emerald Germs of Ireland =

2001 novel by Patrick McCabe

- First edition cover
- Author: Patrick McCabe
- Publisher: HarperCollins
- Publication date: March 1, 2001
- ISBN: 0-06-019678-5

Emerald Germs of Ireland (2001) is a black comedy novel by Irish author Patrick McCabe. Each chapter uses the title of a different song and begins with an epigram of the lyrics.

The title "Emerald Germs of Ireland" is a reference to a music book, mentioned in McCabe's earlier novel The Butcher Boy titled "Emerald Gems of Ireland".

== Plot summary ==
The book focuses on the story of Pat McNab. Through the use of flashbacks and hallucinations it tells of the alternately adoring and critical attention of his mother, Maimie, and the abusiveness of his father describing how it finally sent him over the edge.

After initially killing both his father and mother, he proceeds to kill his neighbors and local visitors to the village whom he believes to be aware of his crimes and attempt to blackmail him.

Eventually, after the removal of each successive "germ", he exhumes his mother's body as an act of closure.

== Chapter titles ==
- Whisky On a Sunday
- The Turfman from Ardee
- Old Flames
- South of the Border
- Courting in the Kitchen
- Three Lovely Lassies in Bannnion
- The Little Drummer Boy
- Fly Me to the Moon
- Waka Waka
- Love Story
- The Garden Where the Praties Grow
- Island of Dreams
- For What It's Worth
- Twenty-One Years
