= Carn (novel) =

Novel by Patrick McCabe

Carn (1989) is a novel by Irish author Patrick McCabe. Set in a fictionalised version of the author's hometown of Clones, it tells the story of the rise and fall of an Irish border town during the peak of the Troubles.

While the town in McCabe's subsequent novel The Butcher Boy remains unnamed in the novel, a banner referring to the town as Carn can be seen in Neil Jordan's film adaptation.
