= Breakfast on Pluto (film) =

2005 film by Neil Jordan

- UK theatrical release poster
- Directed by: Neil Jordan
- Written by: Neil Jordan; Patrick McCabe
- Based on: Breakfast on Pluto by Patrick McCabe
- Produced by: Alan Moloney; Neil Jordan; Stephen Woolley
- Starring: Cillian Murphy; Stephen Rea; Brendan Gleeson; Liam Neeson
- Cinematography: Declan Quinn
- Edited by: Tony Lawson
- Music by: Anna Jordan
- Production companies: Parallel Films; Number 9 Films; Pathé Pictures; Bord Scannán na hÉireann/The Irish Film Board; Northern Ireland Film & Television Commission
- Distributed by: Pathé Distribution
- Release dates: 3 September 2005 (Telluride Film Festival); 13 January 2006 (United Kingdom and Ireland)
- Running time: 129 minutes
- Countries: United Kingdom; Ireland
- Language: English
- Box office: $3.9 million

Breakfast on Pluto is a 2005 comedy-drama film directed by Neil Jordan from a screenplay he co-wrote with Patrick McCabe, based on McCabe's 1998 novel of the same name. Set during the Troubles in the 1970s, the film stars Cillian Murphy as a transgender woman foundling who leaves her small Irish town for London in search of her long-lost mother. Stephen Rea, Brendan Gleeson and Liam Neeson also star.

== Plot ==
In 1958, in the fictional small Irish town of Tyrellin, County Cavan, Eily Bergin leaves her newborn baby, Patrick Braden, on the doorstep of the local parochial house, where the baby's father, Father Liam, lives. Patrick is placed with an unloving foster mother. Young Patrick dons a dress and lipstick, which angers his foster family. Patrick is accepted by his close friends Charlie, Irwin and Lawrence, as well as by Lawrence's father, who tells Patrick that Eily resembled American actress Mitzi Gaynor.

In his late teens in the 1970s, Patrick gets into trouble in school for writing an explicit story imagining how he was conceived by his parents and inquiring about where to undergo a sex change. Patrick comes out as transgender and renames herself Patricia "Kitten" Braden. In confession, she asks Father Liam about Eily but is rebuffed.

Kitten runs away from home, getting a ride with a glam rock band, Billy Hatchet and the Mohawks, and flirting with frontman Billy. He sets Kitten up in a trailer, where she discovers he is hiding guns for the IRA. Meanwhile, Irwin has begun to work with the IRA, much to his now-girlfriend Charlie's dismay. Kitten scoffs at Irwin's politics, but after Lawrence is killed by police detonating a suspected loyalist car bomb, she tosses their gun cache into a lake. Billy abandons Kitten to flee the IRA, forcing her to face the IRA men alone. Her lack of connection to their politics saves her from being murdered.

Kitten heads to London in search of Eily, but initial inquiries prove fruitless. Penniless, she finds shelter in a tiny cottage in a park, only to find that it is a Wombles children's theme park. Kitten takes a job as a singing and dancing Womble, but immediately loses it when her sponsor and co-worker punches their boss. Forced into prostitution, she is strangled by her first client, narrowly escaping by spraying Chanel No. 5 in his eyes.

At a diner, mild-mannered magician Bertie Vaughan asks Kitten what she is writing in her notebook. She explains it is a story about the mother she is seeking, whom Kitten dubs the "Phantom Lady". Intrigued, Bertie hires her as his assistant, turning her life story into a hypnosis act. One day, Bertie tries to kiss Kitten, and she explains that she is transgender, something he already knew. Soon, Charlie finds Bertie's show and takes Kitten away.

While dancing with an English soldier at a nightclub, Kitten is injured when the club is bombed by the IRA. After the police discover that Kitten is transgender and Irish, she is arrested on suspicion of terrorism. At the police station, Wallis beats her up while Routledge urges her to make a statement; Kitten fabricates a story about how she infiltrated a terrorist cell, dressed in black leather and armed with a Chanel spray bottle. Realising she is innocent, the police release her a week later.

Kitten is again forced to turn to prostitution until Wallis sympathetically brings her to a peep show, where she dons a blonde wig. Her repentant father finds her in her booth, professing his love and telling Kitten where to find Eily. She goes to her house posing as a telephone company market researcher and discovers a younger half-brother, also named Patrick. She faints upon meeting Eily, but after reviving does not reveal her identity.

Kitten learns that Charlie was arrested and used as leverage against Irwin to reveal IRA activities. As a result, Irwin is killed by the IRA, and Kitten returns to Tyrellin to tend to a pregnant Charlie and reconcile with her priest father. The town reacts against the unwed pregnant mother and her transgender friend by firebombing the parish house one night, but the two are rescued by Father Liam.

Kitten and Charlie head back to London, with Father Liam promising to visit frequently. While accompanying Charlie to a hospital for a postnatal checkup, Kitten encounters little Patrick, who reveals that Eily is pregnant. Still not revealing her identity, Kitten sees Eily in the distance and tells Patrick that she hopes that Eily's next baby is a girl.

== Cast ==
- Cillian Murphy as Patrick/Patricia "Kitten" Braden
  - Conor McEvoy as young Patrick Braden
- Stephen Rea as Bertie Vaughan
- Brendan Gleeson as John Joe Kenny
- Liam Neeson as Father Liam
- Eva Birthistle as Eily Bergin
- Liam Cunningham as 1st biker
- Bryan Ferry as Mr Silky String
- Gavin Friday as Billy Hatchett
- Ian Hart as PC Wallis
- Laurence Kinlan as Irwin
  - Emmet Lawlor McHugh as young Irwin
- Ruth McCabe as Ma Braden
- Ruth Negga as Charlie
  - Bianca O'Connor as young Charlie
- Steven Waddington as Inspector Routledge
- Mary Coughlan as housekeeper
- Charlene McKenna as Caroline Braden
- Seamus Reilly as Lawrence Feely
- Paraic Breathnach as Benny Feely
- Patrick McCabe as Schoolmaster Peepers Egan
- Dominic Cooper as squaddie at disco

== Production ==
To prepare for the lead role of Kitten, Cillian Murphy studied women's body language and for a few weeks met with a transgender woman who instructed him and took him out clubbing with friends.

Neil Jordan and Pat McCabe made big changes to the story in their adaptation of the novel for the silver screen. In the book, the protagonist is called "Pussy", but Jordan and McCabe rename her "Kitten" in the film. Unlike the highly sexual Pussy, who is sexually involved with numerous male and female characters in some rather kinky situations as well as a few long-term relationships, Kitten is never shown to engage in kissing or any other sexual behaviour. One sexual encounter for hire is strongly implied, but Kitten is not shown being overtly sexual with anyone on screen. Kitten's flirtatious relationships with the series of male characters she meets throughout the film are never shown or strongly implied to have been consummated, leaving the yearning main character unrequited.

The seaside scene between Kitten and Bertie was considered by some to be an allusion to director Jordan's earlier film The Crying Game, which also involved a transgender major character, the IRA and actor Stephen Rea. In The Crying Game, Rea's character doesn't realise that the woman he has fallen for and becomes sexually involved with is transgender. In Breakfast on Pluto, Kitten confesses that she's "not a girl" before Rea's character can kiss her, and he says kindly that he already knew, but does not follow through with the kiss.

The author of the novel upon which the film is based, co-screenwriter Patrick McCabe, has a cameo in the film as Kitten's creative writing teacher.

== Reception ==
=== Critical response ===
On the review aggregator website Rotten Tomatoes, 58% of 123 critics' reviews are positive, with an average rating of 6.1/10. The website's consensus reads: "Well-acted if monotonous drama about a transvestite prostitute in London during the 1970s." Metacritic, which uses a weighted average, assigned the film a score of 59 out of 100, based on 36 critics, indicating "mixed or average" reviews.

=== Accolades ===
For his portrayal of Kitten, Murphy won the 2007 IFTA Award for Best Actor and was nominated for a Golden Globe for Best Performance by an Actor in a Motion Picture – Musical or Comedy.

Jordan also won the 2007 IFTA for Best Director and Jordan and McCabe took home the Best Script IFTA.

Awards
Award	Category	Name	Outcome
European Film Awards	Best Actor	Cillian Murphy	Nominated
Golden Globe Awards	Best Actor – Motion Picture Musical or Comedy	Cillian Murphy	Nominated
Golden Trailer Awards	Best Foreign Dramatic Trailer		Nominated
Golden Trailer Awards	Best Voice Over		Nominated
Irish Film and Television Awards	Best Actor in a Lead Role in a Feature Film	Cillian Murphy	Won
Irish Film and Television Awards	Best Director	Neil Jordan	Won
Irish Film and Television Awards	Best Hair & Make-Up for Film	Glynn, Lorraine, Lynn Johnson	Won
Irish Film and Television Awards	Best Script for Film	Neil Jordan, Patrick McCabe	Won
Irish Film and Television Awards	Best Irish Film (Audience Award)		Nominated
Irish Film and Television Awards	Best Actor in a Supporting Role in a Feature Film	Stephen Rea	Nominated
Irish Film and Television Awards	Best Actress in a Supporting Role in a Feature Film	Ruth Negga	Nominated
Irish Film and Television Awards	Best Cinematography	Declan Quinn	Nominated
Irish Film and Television Awards	Best Costume Design for Film	Eimer Ni Mhaoldomhnaigh	Nominated
Irish Film and Television Awards	Best Film	Alan Moloney, Neil Jordan, Stephen Woolley	Nominated
Irish Film and Television Awards	Best Production Design for Film	Tom Conroy	Nominated
Ljubljana International Film Festival	Audience Award	Neil Jordan	Won
National Board of Review	Special Recognition For excellence in filmmaking		Won
Satellite Awards	Best Actor – Motion Picture Musical or Comedy	Cillian Murphy	Nominated

== See also ==
- Hedwig and the Angry Inch (2001)
- The Crying Game (1992)
- Velvet Goldmine (1998)
