= The Butcher Boy (1997 film) =

- American theatrical release poster
- Directed by: Neil Jordan
- Screenplay by: Patrick McCabe; Neil Jordan
- Based on: The Butcher Boy by Patrick McCabe
- Produced by: Redmond Morris; Stephen Woolley
- Starring: Stephen Rea; Fiona Shaw; Eamonn Owens
- Cinematography: Adrian Biddle
- Edited by: Tony Lawson
- Music by: Elliot Goldenthal
- Production company: The Geffen Film Company
- Distributed by: Warner Bros.
- Release dates: 13 July 1997 (Galway Film Fleadh); 20 February 1998 (UK); 3 April 1998 (US)
- Running time: 110 minutes
- Country: Ireland
- Language: English
- Box office: $5 million

The Butcher Boy is a 1997 Irish black comedy film directed by Neil Jordan. The film was based on Patrick McCabe's 1992 novel of the same name and McCabe co-wrote the screenplay with Jordan.

Set in the early 1960s, The Butcher Boy is about Francie Brady (Eamonn Owens), a 12-year-old boy who retreats into a violent fantasy world to escape the reality of his dysfunctional family; as his circumstances worsen, his sanity deteriorates and he begins acting out, with increasing brutality. The film won the Silver Bear for Best Director at the 48th Berlin International Film Festival in 1998 and a Special Mention for Owens "astonishing lead". It also won the European Film Award for Best Cinematographer for Adrian Biddle.

The Butcher Boy was the final film produced by The Geffen Film Company until 2024's Beetlejuice Beetlejuice, and was released before the original company was folded into Warner Bros. in 1998. In addition, it was also Sinéad O'Connor's final feature film before her death in 2023.

== Plot ==
The film is set in Ireland in the early 1960s in the small town of Clones. Francie Brady is a 12-year-old boy whose imagination is fuelled by television - aliens, communists, the Atomic Age. When his mother suffers a nervous breakdown and ultimately commits suicide, he is left in the care of his father, an emotionally distant and ill-tempered alcoholic. Francie spends most of his time with his best friend Joe Purcell talking about "gangsters, cowboys and Indians, comic-book monsters and the early-1960s threat of nuclear annihilation." However, when Francie's growing conflict with another boy, Phillip Nugent, and his mother begins to go too far, he ends up at reform school. Here, he is molested by Father Sullivan, and finds solace only in his fantasies about a foul-mouthed Virgin Mary. He returns home to find Joe has outgrown him and befriended Phillip Nugent. Before long, his father has drunk himself to death. Faced with being left completely alone in the world, Francie loses his grip on reality and lashes out with uncontrollable brutality, which shocks his provincial hometown.

== Cast ==
- Eamonn Owens as Francie Brady
- Stephen Rea as Benny Brady (Da) / Adult Francie (uncredited)
- Fiona Shaw as Mrs. Nugent
- Andrew Fullerton as Phillip Nugent
- Aisling O'Sullivan as Annie Brady (Ma)
- Alan Boyle as Joe Purcell
- Seán McGinley as Sergeant
- Ian Hart as Uncle Alo
- Brendan Gleeson as Father Bubbles
- Milo O'Shea as Father Sullivan
- Sinéad O'Connor as Virgin Mary / Colleen
- Gina Moxley as Mary
- John Kavanagh as Doctor Boyd
- Niall Buggy as Father Dom

== Production ==
The screen rights to the book were bought by Neil Jordan in 1992 during the filming of Interview with the Vampire. The adaptation is mostly faithful to the novel, but there are some differences, the principal change being the ending. In the book, Francie is not seen to leave prison, and attempts to forge a friendship with an inmate similar to the one he had with Joe. In the film, a much older Francie is released from prison at the end to be brought to a halfway house. He picks a snowdrop, echoing the opening of the film.

Casting the child to play Francie was difficult. With no previous filming experiences, Eamonn Owens and Alan Boyle (who played Francie's best friend, Joe) were found at the local school in Killeshandra in County Cavan where casting assistant Maureen Hughes went to visit her uncle. Owens' younger brother Ciaran was also cast. Jordan cast O'Connor because "she looks like the Virgin Mary."

The "expansive" driveway which leads up to Harristown House in County Kildare, Ireland, as well as the private estate bridge, appeared in the film.

== Adaptation ==
Patrick McCabe's accomplishment with The Butcher Boy was deemed unattainable in a film. During the screenwriting process, McCabe wrote two drafts that digressed from the original novel, like "planets within planets within planets" according to Jordan, consequently, Jordan wrote the third draft that was more faithful to the novel. Jordan cast McCabe in the role of town drunk Jimmy the Skite.

Jordan captures Francie's mental illness by using voice-overs where the adult narrator Francie speaks with the child Francie. Andrew O'Hehir at Salon Entertainment criticizes Jordan and McCabe for an occasional "flavor of an after-school special purveying didactic lessons about abuse and victimization," and losing "the novel's Beckettian ambiguity." However, he argues that Jordan "brings a tenderness and sweetness" to the otherwise unforgiving subject matter.

== Reception ==
The reception of the film has been generally positive. Review aggregator Rotten Tomatoes shows a 77% rating based on 61 reviews and an average rating of 7.4/10. The site's critics consensus reads, "Equal parts comical and harrowing, The Butcher Boy is a sobering tale of abuse told with an imaginative lyricism that is by turns inspired and distracting."

Andrew O'Hehir of Salon said, "Neil Jordan's sweetly tragicomic movie" has "elaborate fantasy sequences [that] feel like irrelevant amusements." He also praises the film as "a compelling exploration of the permeable border between normal childhood and full-on insanity." Jeffrey M. Anderson at Combustible Celluloid called the film "a roller-coaster ride for your brain. It's the most alive and deeply-felt movie I've seen in 1998." Emanuel Levy at Variety said it is "Neil Jordan's most accomplished and brilliant film to date."

Owens received widespread acclaim for his performance; he was awarded a Special Mention at the Berlin Film Festival in 1998.

The film grossed £1,807,666 ($3 million) in the UK and Ireland, the highest-grossing Irish film of the year. In the United States and Canada, it grossed $1,995,911 for a worldwide total of over $5 million.

== Awards ==
Award	Category	Recipient	Result
European Film Awards	Best Cinematographer	Adrian Biddle	Won
Berlin International Film Festival	Silver Bear for Best Director	Neil Jordan	Won
Berlin International Film Festival	Special Mention (for Astonishing Lead)	Eamonn Owens	Won
Los Angeles Film Critics Association Awards	Best Music	Elliot Goldenthal	Won
Los Angeles Film Critics Association Awards	Best Film		runner-up
National Board of Review Awards	Top 10 Films		Won

== Soundtrack ==
Elliot Goldenthal composed the soundtrack for the film, which was released on CD in 1998. Goldenthal for this score mixes many different music genres and styles, yet this is one of his most melodic scores. The title song is performed by Sinéad O'Connor.

== Home media ==
A widescreen, closed-captioned version of the film was released on DVD on 13 February 2007 by Warner Home Video. The disc contains deleted scenes and an audio commentary by Neil Jordan.
