= Watermelon (film) =

2003 British television film

- DVD case
- Based on: Watermelon by Marian Keyes
- Screenplay by: Colin Bateman
- Directed by: Kieron J. Walsh
- Starring: Anna Friel; Jamie Draven; Ciarán McMenamin; Sean McGinley; Brenda Fricker
- Countries of origin: United Kingdom; Ireland
- Original language: English

Production
- Producer: Christine Langan
- Running time: 74 minutes
- Budget: €2.5 million

Original release
- Network: ITV
- Release: 16 April 2003

Watermelon is a 2003 television film directed by Kieron J. Walsh and starring Anna Friel, Jamie Draven, Ciarán McMenamin, Sean McGinley, and Brenda Fricker. It was released on 16 April 2003 on channel ITV. The screenplay is by Colin Bateman. The film is inspired by the novel of the same name by Marian Keyes. It is a lighthearted Irish drama following the troubles of a young couple when he finds out his beloved is carrying another man’s baby.

== Plot ==
At twenty-nine, Claire has everything she ever wanted: a boyfriend she adores, a great apartment, a good job. Then, she finds out she's pregnant with her ex-boyfriend's baby. She tries to tell her boyfriend, James, that he's not the father, but he doesn't quite give her the chance to get it out. On the day she gives birth, when Claire admits that he's not the father, James informs Claire that he's leaving her. Claire is left with a newborn daughter, a broken heart, and a body that she can hardly bear to look at in the mirror. In the absence of any better offers, Claire decides to go home to her family in Dublin and live with her sister Anna, her soap-watching mother Teresa and her bewildered father Joe. Sheltered by the love of a family, she gets better. Adam, the real father, comes to see Claire and Kate (their daughter), and takes Claire out for dinner with the intention of proposing, "as a moral man". James flies in that same night. When Teresa realizes that James truly loves her daughter, she tells him which restaurant Claire is at. Adam is understanding when Claire chooses James.

== Cast ==
- Anna Friel as Claire Ryan
- Brenda Fricker as Teresa Ryan
- Ciarán McMenamin as Adam Collins
- Jamie Draven as James Wearing
- Elaine Cassidy as Anna Ryan
- Sean McGinley as Joe Ryan

== Reception ==
Shane Hegarty of The Irish Times wrote: "It wasn't so much an hour and a half you'll never get back, just an hour and half you'll never remember having."

=== Ratings ===
The show attracted nearly 6 million viewers, successfully counter-programming against the football match on at the same time.

=== Awards ===
Irish Film and Television Awards

Year	Nominee / work	Award	Result
2003	Linda Mooney and Carol Dunne	Best Hair / Make-up	Won
2003	Watermelon	Best TV Drama	Nominated
2003	Eimer Ní Mhaoldomhnaigh	Best Costume Design	Nominated
