= Mondo Desperado =

1999 book by Patrick McCabe

- First edition (publ. Picador)
- Author: Patrick McCabe
- Publisher: HarperCollins (US)
- Publication date: March 1, 2000
- ISBN: 0-06-019461-8 (US)

Mondo Desperado (1999) is a short story collection by Irish writer Patrick McCabe. The novel bills as a short story collection by a fictitious author, Phildy Hackball, a resident "homeboy" from the small town of Barntrosna.

== Plot summaries ==
Many of the ten (10) short stories contained within Mondo Desperado observe the odd and dysfunctional aspects of humanity. McCabe's short stories include recurring themes which challenge traditionally respected figures within Irish culture - priests, schoolteachers and nurses. The novel utilizes black humour and McCabe's language is a distorted yet authentic idiom, described by one reviewer as "a souped-up Blarney".

The Bursted Priest tells the story of how a young man, Declan Coyningham, deemed the holiest boy in town, is blown up by his schoolmates. The Forbidden Love of Noreen Tiernan involves an intern nurse, Noreen, working in London who becomes involuntarily embroiled in a homoerotic affair with her roommate.
