= Adrian Biddle =

English cinematographer (1952–2005)

- Born: Adrian Charles Biddle; 20 July 1952; Woolwich, London, England
- Died: 7 December 2005 (aged 53); London, England
- Occupation: Cinematographer
- Years active: 1967–2005
- Organization: British Society of Cinematographers
- Children: 3

Adrian Charles Biddle BSC (20 July 1952 – 7 December 2005) was an English cinematographer. Over a career spanning more than three decades, he served as director of photography on 26 feature films, and is best remembered for his first and last credits in that role: Aliens (1986) and V for Vendetta (2005). He is also noted for his collaborations with Ridley Scott, including Thelma & Louise (1991), which earned him Academy Award and BAFTA Award nominations for Best Cinematography.

== Life and career ==
Adrian Charles Biddle was born on 20 July 1952 in Woolwich, south-east London, as the son of a greengrocer. A talented competitive swimmer in his youth, he represented the county of Kent. This proved decisive in launching his career in the film industry. During this time entry into the closed-shop British film unions was tightly restricted and thus there was little competition for underwater camera work. Around the age of 14 or 15, the underwater photographer Egil Woxholt hired Biddle as an apprentice. One of his earliest assignments involved filming the Severn Bore, the dramatic tidal wave that travels up the River Severn.

Impressed by the young man's determination, Woxholt took him on as a camera-department trainee on the production of Captain Nemo and the Underwater City (1969), filming in Egypt and Malta. That same year, still only 16 or 17, Biddle worked uncredited on the underwater sequences of the James Bond film On Her Majesty's Secret Service (1969), and continued in a similar capacity on When Eight Bells Toll and Murphy's War (both 1971).

Biddle later began working on commercials for Ridley Scott's company, Ridley Scott Associates (RSA) in then 1970s. When Scott moved into feature films, he selected Biddle as clapper loader on Scott's directorial debut, The Duellists (1977), and promoted him to focus puller on Alien (1979). Scott preferred to operate the camera himself and direct from its position; as a result, Biddle spent these formative years in constant proximity to the director, closely observing and absorbing his approach to composition, lighting and visual storytelling.

After Alien, Biddle returned primarily to filming advertising. In 1980, at the age of 28, he received his first opportunity to work as a lighting cameraman when Howard Guard, newly arrived at RSA, gave him the chance to light a commercial. Over the following years he built a strong body of advertising work, developing new lighting techniques suited to the sharper, higher-contrast imagery then favoured in commercials. Notably he worked on the 1984 ad for Apple, also directed by Scott. That advert's photography, along with a personal recommendation from Scott, prompted James Cameron to hire Biddle for Aliens (1986), after the original cinematographer Dick Bush left over creative differences. By the age of 32, Biddle was considered "A-List" in Hollywood for his efforts.

Biddle was a cinematographer on another 25 feature films, including Scott's Thelma & Louise (1991), which earned him nominations for the Academy Award for Best Cinematography BAFTA for Best Cinematography. His other credits included Rob Reiner's The Princess Bride (1987), Ron Howard's Willow (1988), Scott's 1492: Conquest of Paradise (1992), Neil Jordan's The Butcher Boy (1997; which earned Biddle the European Film Award for Best Cinematographer), Paul W. S. Anderson's Event Horizon (1997), the James Bond film The World Is Not Enough (1999), The Mummy (1999) and its sequel (2001), and Bridget Jones: The Edge of Reason (2004).

Biddle died at the age of 53 on December 7, 2005. His wife was driving him from their home in Weybridge to shoot a commercial in Central London when he suffered a heart attack. He survived by his wife Mo and his three children, Alice, Esther and Alfie, who is also a cinematographer. V for Vendetta, which he had finished filming, was dedicated to his memory.

== Filmography ==
=== Film ===
==== As cinematographer ====
| Year | Title | Director | Notes |
|---|---|---|---|
| 1986 | Aliens | James Cameron | |
| 1987 | The Princess Bride | Rob Reiner | |
| 1988 | Willow | Ron Howard | |
| 1988 | The Dawning | Robert Knights | |
| 1989 | The Tall Guy | Mel Smith | |
| 1991 | Thelma & Louise | Ridley Scott | |
| 1992 | 1492: Conquest of Paradise | Ridley Scott | |
| 1994 | City Slickers II: The Legend of Curly's Gold | Paul Weiland | |
| 1995 | Judge Dredd | Danny Cannon | |
| 1996 | 101 Dalmatians | Stephen Herek | |
| 1997 | The Butcher Boy | Neil Jordan | |
| 1997 | Event Horizon | Paul W. S. Anderson | |
| 1997 | Fierce Creatures | Robert Young; Fred Schepisi | With Ian Baker |
| 1998 | Holy Man | Stephen Herek | |
| 1999 | The World Is Not Enough | Michael Apted | |
| 1999 | The Mummy | Stephen Sommers | |
| 2000 | The Weight of Water | Kathryn Bigelow | |
| 2000 | 102 Dalmatians | Kevin Lima | With Roger Pratt |
| 2001 | The Mummy Returns | Stephen Sommers | |
| 2002 | Reign of Fire | Rob Bowman | |
| 2003 | Shanghai Knights | David Dobkin | |
| 2004 | Bridget Jones: The Edge of Reason | Beeban Kidron | |
| 2004 | Laws of Attraction | Peter Howitt | |
| 2005 | An American Haunting | Courtney Solomon | Posthumous release |
| 2005 | V for Vendetta | James McTeigue | Posthumous release |

=== Television ===
| Year | Title | Director | Notes |
|---|---|---|---|
| 1989 | Smith and Jones in Small Doses | Paul Weiland | Episode "Second Thoughts" |

== Awards and nominations ==
| Year | Award | Category | Title | Result |
|---|---|---|---|---|
| 1991 | Academy Awards | Best Cinematography | Thelma & Louise | Nominated |
| 1991 | BAFTA Awards | Best Cinematography | Thelma & Louise | Nominated |
| 1991 | British Society of Cinematographers | Best Cinematography | Thelma & Louise | Nominated |
| 1992 | British Society of Cinematographers | Best Cinematography | 1492: Conquest of Paradise | Nominated |
| 1997 | European Film Awards | Best Cinematographer | The Butcher Boy | Won |
