= Breakfast on Pluto =

1998 novel by Patrick McCabe

- First edition cover
- Author: Patrick McCabe
- Language: English
- Genre: Novel
- Publisher: Picador
- Publication date: 25 May 1998
- Publication place: Ireland
- Media type: Print (Hardback & Paperback)
- Pages: 208 pp (first edition, hardback)
- ISBN: 0-330-35293-8 (first edition, hardback)
- OCLC: 39284951
- LC Class: ACQUISITION IN PROCESS (COPIED)

Breakfast on Pluto is a 1998 novel by Patrick McCabe. The book was shortlisted for the 1998 Booker Prize, and was adapted for the screen by McCabe and Neil Jordan; Jordan directed the 2005 film. The author derived the novel's title from the 1969 hit record Breakfast On Pluto by Don Partridge.

== Plot summary ==
Set in 1960s to 1970s, the novel tells of Patrick "Pussy" Braden's escape from the fictional Irish town of Tyreelin and a drunk foster mother, to find herself and the biological mother who gave her away. Bad luck surrounds her until she finds temporary contentment with a married politician who acts as a sugar daddy. The latter is killed by either the IRA or the Ulster Defence Volunteers, leaving Braden alone once again. She moves to London, becomes a prostitute in Piccadilly Circus, and later is arrested on suspicion of an IRA bombing, only to be released a few days later. She later embarks on a search to find her mother.

== Film adaptation ==
Director Neil Jordan's 2005 film adaptation of the same name starred Cillian Murphy in the central role. In the film, the main character is called "Kitten", not "Pussy", and there are other significant differences between the two versions of the characters, a central one being that the hypersexual Pussy is depicted explicitly as having sex with many male and female characters throughout the novel, while on screen Kitten is not shown even kissing another character on the lips.

Pussy's politician lover in the novel becomes a glam rock musician played by Gavin Friday with whom Kitten may or may not have had a sexual relationship, and Pussy's lover Bertie Wooster becomes magician Bertie Vaughan (Stephen Rea), with whom Kitten has an unrequited flirtation. Liam Neeson plays the priest that Braden believes is her biological father, a character renamed Father Liam, although a number of reviews erroneously call him Father Bernard, as in the book.

Cillian Murphy won an IFTA Award (2007) for Best Actor and was nominated for Golden Globe (2006) as Best Actor in Musical or Comedy for his performance. Patrick McCabe and Neil Jordan won the IFTA for Best Script, and Jordan also won Best Director.
