= Brideshead Revisited (film) =

- Original release poster
- Directed by: Julian Jarrold
- Screenplay by: Jeremy Brock; Andrew Davies
- Based on: Brideshead Revisited by Evelyn Waugh
- Produced by: Robert Bernstein; Kevin Loader; Douglas Rae
- Starring: Matthew Goode; Ben Whishaw; Hayley Atwell; Emma Thompson; Michael Gambon; Greta Scacchi; Jonathan Cake; Patrick Malahide
- Cinematography: Jess Hall
- Edited by: Chris Gill
- Music by: Adrian Johnston
- Production companies: Miramax Films; HanWay Films; UK Film Council; BBC Films; Screen Yorkshire; 2 Entertain; Ecosse Films
- Distributed by: Buena Vista International
- Release date: 25 July 2008
- Running time: 133 minutes
- Country: United Kingdom
- Language: English
- Budget: $20 million
- Box office: $13.5 million

Brideshead Revisited is a 2008 British drama film directed by Julian Jarrold. The screenplay by Jeremy Brock and Andrew Davies is based on the 1945 novel of the same name by Evelyn Waugh, which previously had been adapted in 1981 as the television serial Brideshead Revisited.

== Plot ==
Although he aspires to become an artist, middle-class Charles Ryder reads history at the University of Oxford, where he befriends the flamboyant and wealthy Lord Sebastian Flyte. Sebastian's mother, Lady Marchmain, strongly disapproves of Sebastian's lifestyle, especially his heavy drinking. When Sebastian takes Charles home to visit his nanny, Charles is enthralled by the grandeur of the Marchmain family estate, known as Brideshead, and entranced by its residents, including the devout Roman Catholic Lady Marchmain and her other children, Sebastian's elder brother Bridey and his sisters Julia and Cordelia.

When Lord Marchmain invites Sebastian and Julia to visit him and his mistress Cara in Venice, Lady Marchmain encourages Charles to go with them in the hope that he can act as a positive influence on her son. Increasingly interested in Julia, Charles surreptitiously kisses her in a dark alley, unaware that Sebastian can see them from the other side of a canal. Jealous of his attention to his sister, Sebastian sets out to end this friendship, and on their return to Britain, Lady Marchmain makes it clear that Charles cannot marry Julia since he is not Catholic and professes to be an atheist.

Sebastian's mother, concerned about his increasing alcoholism, cancels his allowance. During a visit to Brideshead, Ryder gives Sebastian money, which he uses to buy alcohol. Later that day, at a party given by the family, Charles is shocked when Lady Marchmain announces that the celebration is in honour of Julia's engagement to Canadian businessman Rex Mottram. Sebastian arrives at the party late and improperly dressed. After an embarrassing scene, Sebastian flees the party. Lady Marchmain privately dresses down Charles because he gave Sebastian money, and tells him he is no longer welcome at Brideshead. Sebastian flees to Morocco.

Four years elapse. Lady Marchmain has become terminally ill. She asks Charles to find Sebastian and bring him home. Charles travels to Morocco, but Sebastian cannot return even if he wants to, which he clearly does not. He is in the hospital with fluid in one of his lungs, and the doctor warns Charles that Sebastian is too ill to travel.

More time elapses. Julia marries Rex, and Charles marries as well and becomes successful as an artist.

Charles is reunited with Julia on an ocean liner traveling to Britain from New York. They immediately realise they are still in love and decide to leave their respective spouses and live together. Charles and Julia return to Brideshead, where Charles plans to ask Rex to step aside so he and Julia can be together. Rex first implies he will never let Julia go, and accuses Charles of just wanting the estate. However, he then relents and agrees to release her in exchange for two of Charles's paintings, which are now viewed as a good investment. He also reveals that he converted to Catholicism to get Julia, and he disdains Charles for not having been willing to do the same. Julia overhears all of this and is shocked and angered, feeling like bartered goods. Their arrangements are made, and Charles and Julia prepare to leave Brideshead.

Just as they are driving out, however, they pass two cars arriving: Lord Marchmain is terminally ill and has returned with Cara to spend his final days in his home. On his deathbed, Lord Marchmain, who hitherto has not wanted Catholicism, regains his faith and dies reconciled to the Roman Catholic Church. Deeply affected by her father's transformation, Julia decides she cannot relinquish her own faith to be with Charles, and the two sadly part.

Several years later, the Second World War is in progress. A disillusioned Charles, now an army captain, finds himself once again at Brideshead, this time in its capacity as a military base. A corporal tells him Julia is serving in the women's services overseas and that her elder brother, Bridey, died during the Blitz. We also learn that he is alone – he has no girlfriend or wife.

Charles visits the family chapel, where he finds a single lit candle. He dips his hand into holy water and moves to snuff out the candle, as it is almost out of wax. However, he then reconsiders and leaves the flame to burn.

== Cast ==
- Matthew Goode as Charles Ryder
- Ben Whishaw as Lord Sebastian Flyte
- Hayley Atwell as Lady Julia Flyte
- Emma Thompson as Teresa Flyte, Marchioness of Marchmain (Lady Marchmain)
- Michael Gambon as Alexander Flyte, Marquess of Marchmain (Lord Marchmain)
- Greta Scacchi as Cara
- Anna Madeley as Celia Ryder
- Patrick Malahide as Mr. Ryder
- Felicity Jones as Lady Cordelia Flyte
- Ed Stoppard as Earl of Brideshead, "Bridey" (Lord Brideshead)
- Jonathan Cake as Rex Mottram
- Joseph Beattie as Anthony Blanche
- James Bradshaw as Mr. Samgrass

== Production ==
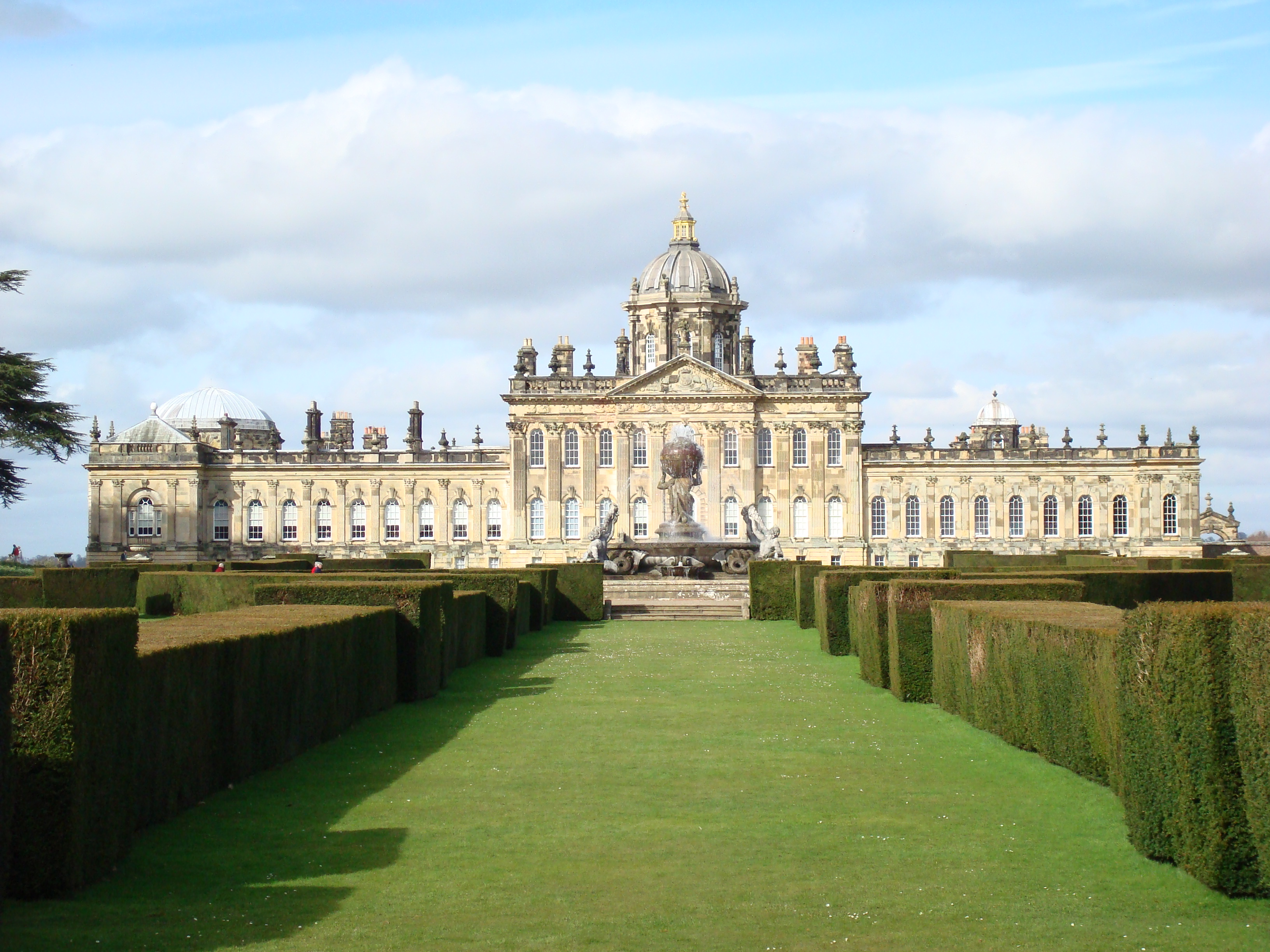
Castle Howard in North Yorkshire was used as Brideshead for the film.

Actors Paul Bettany, Jude Law, and Jennifer Connelly were signed for the lead roles by the original director David Yates for Warner Independent Pictures in 2004. However, constant budget issues stalled the film's production and Yates left the project to direct Harry Potter and the Order of the Phoenix. This led to the roles being recast by directorial replacement Julian Jarrold.

Just as it did for the earlier television adaptation of Waugh's novel, Castle Howard in North Yorkshire serves as the setting for Brideshead. In The World of Brideshead, a bonus feature on the DVD release of the film, Simon Howard reveals his family was eager to welcome film crews to the estate once again. It had become a major tourist attraction after the television serial aired; they hoped the feature film would renew interest in the property.

Principal photography took place at Castle Howard during the summer of 2007, and many extras were employed from the local population in and around York.

The ending of the film was also altered from that of the novel. In the film, Charles leaves the family chapel at Brideshead seemingly unchanged in his atheist/agnostic leanings, although he decides not to snuff out the candle that is burning. The novel ends with Charles entering the chapel and kneeling down to pray using "ancient and newly learned words", thus implying he has recently converted to Catholicism.

== Release ==
=== Box office ===
The film opened on thirty-three screens in the United States on 25 July 2008 and grossed $332,000 on its opening weekend, ranking twenty-first at the box office. It eventually earned $6,432,256 in the US and $7,018,930 elsewhere for a total worldwide box office of $13,451,186.

=== Critical reception ===
Review aggregation website Rotten Tomatoes gives the film an approval rating of 62% based on reviews from 140 critics, with an average rating of 6.20/10. The site's critical consensus reads, "Suspenseful and beautifully mounted, Brideshead Revisited does an able job condensing Evelyn Waugh's novel." Metacritic calculated an average score of 64 out of 100 based on 32 reviews, indicating "generally favorable reviews".

Comparing the film to the earlier television adaptation, A.O. Scott of The New York Times called it "necessarily shorter and less faithful to Waugh's book, and also, for what it's worth, more cinematic. It is also tedious, confused and banal." He blamed director Jarrold and screenwriters Davies and Brock "for finding so little new or interesting to say... and for systematically stripping Waugh's novel of its telling nuances and provocative ideas." He concluded, "The long experience of English Catholics as a religious minority, the subtle gradations of class in the British university system, the crazy quilt of sexual norms and taboos governing the lives of young adults: all of this is what makes Brideshead Revisited live and breathe as a novel. None of it registers with any force in this lazy, complacent film, which takes the novel's name in vain."

Roger Ebert of the Chicago Sun-Times observed, "While elegantly mounted and well acted, the movie is not the equal of the TV production, in part because so much material had to be compressed into such a shorter time. It is also not the equal of the recent film Atonement, which in an oblique way touches on similar issues. But it is a good, sound example of the British period drama; mid-range Merchant-Ivory, you could say."

Mark Olsen of the Los Angeles Times said, "The film's strengths are in Waugh's story and not so much in the particular spin of these filmmakers. Their decision to turn up the volume on the homosexual undertones between Sebastian and Charles feels like an unimaginative nod to our modern times... In Brideshead, Jarrold seems too often to consciously be making an in-quotation-marks classy picture, much like last year's Atonement, in which the costumes and setting are just so, but the human drama gets lost amid the pictorial pleasantries. That the film is neither a true triumph nor a total disaster makes it somewhat difficult to justify revisiting Brideshead, apart from the hope it will inspire someone somewhere to pick up the book."

David Wiegand of the San Francisco Chronicle called it "a very noble movie, which makes it interesting at times, but not often enough... What Jarrold has done right is to hire Andrew Davies to work with Jeremy Brock on the adaptation. There's no one better at dusting off English classics for the wide and small screens than Davies. He and Brock have done a competent job of culling just the right plot elements from Waugh's book and assembling them into a serviceable story. Whether you want to stick it out, however, is another matter entirely... Jarrold and his writers are more than respectful of the original source material, but compressing it all into two hours and change doesn't make for a terribly enjoyable film... Davies and Brock perform miracles in making this somewhat workable, but the ultimate impossibility of their task shows at the end."

David Ansen of Newsweek suggested, "Think of Jarrold's briskly paced, stylish abridgment as a fine introduction to Waugh's marvelously melancholy elegy. It brings these unforgettable characters to life again, and if it sends people back to the novel, and back to the classic TV series... all the better. There's room for more than one Brideshead in this far less glamorous day and age."

Owen Gleiberman of Entertainment Weekly graded the film B and commented, "Brideshead Revisited is opulent and watchable, yet except for Thompson's acting, it's missing something – a grander, more ambivalent vision of the England it depicts dying out. In the series, we looked at that palatial fortress of Brideshead manor and thought: Here, in one house, is a fading empire. In the movie, it's just sublime real estate."

Dennis Harvey of Variety called the film "finely wrought" and added, "Purists may blanch at the screenplay's changes to the source material's narrative fine points, but its spirit survives intact... Goode provides a fine center of gravity as the middle-class tourist in heady but toxic upper-class realms. Thompson superbly etches a complex, eventually tragic portrait in her relatively few scenes."

Geoffrey Macnab of The Independent rated the film three out of five stars and called it "flawed and uneven". He added, "In trying to shoehorn Waugh's novel into a two-hour movie, the filmmakers have left characters underdeveloped while skipping over plot points and condensing material that surely requires greater exposition. Boldly – and perhaps rashly – they have almost entirely dispensed with voiceover narration. Anyone expecting an equivalent to Jeremy Irons' evocative reading of Waugh's prose will be disappointed... On the credit side, this Brideshead boasts a handful of very strong performances... Emma Thompson makes a formidable Lady Marchmain and Michael Gambon is dependable as ever as Lord Marchmain but this Brideshead is slow to build momentum. At first, it is hard to engage emotionally in a story that leaps around in time and skirts over what should be key events, but the film grows progressively stronger and more moving."

=== Home media ===
The film was released on DVD in anamorphic widescreen format, with subtitles in English for the hearing impaired and Spanish, on 13 January 2009. Bonus features include commentary by director Julian Jarrold, producer Kevin Loader, and screenwriter Jeremy Brock, deleted scenes, and The World of Brideshead, featuring interviews with cast and crew members.

== Accolades ==
Nominations

- Satellite Award for Best Supporting Actress – Motion Picture (Emma Thompson)
- Satellite Award for Best Cinematography (Jess Hall)
- Satellite Award for Best Costume Design (Eimer Ni Mhaoldomhnaigh)
- Satellite Award for Best Art Direction and Production Design (Alice Normington)
- British Independent Film Award for Best Supporting Actress (Thompson)
- GLAAD Media Award for Outstanding Film in Wide Release
- London Film Critics' Circle Award for Best British Supporting Actress of the Year (Thompson)
