= Eimer Ní Mhaoldomhnaigh =

Irish costume designer

- Education: Limerick School of Art and Design
- Occupation: Costume designer
- Years active: 1994–present
- Known for: The Wind That Shakes the Barley, Becoming Jane, Brideshead Revisited

Eimer Ní Mhaoldomhnaigh (/ˈiːmər niː veɪlˈdaʊnɪɡ/ EE-mər nee vayl-DOWN-ig, Irish: [ˈɪmʲəɾˠ n̠ʲiː ˈvˠeːl̪ˠd̪ˠoːnˠiː]) is an Irish costume designer. Much of her career has been in Irish and British-Irish productions, such as Michael Collins (1996), The Wind That Shakes the Barley (2006), Brideshead Revisited (2008), Ondine (2009), The Guard (2011), Calvary (2014), The Rhythm Section (2020), Foundation (2021), and The Banshees of Inisherin (2022). She has been nominated eleven times for Best Costume Design from the Irish Film & Television Academy, winning for The Rhythm Section. Other nominations include Emmy, Critics Choice, and Satellite Awards. Eimer was elected to AMPAS in 2020.

== Career ==
Eimer Ní Mhaoldomhnaigh is from Limerick, Ireland where she graduated from the Limerick School of Art and Design. She studied fashion initially before moving into film in the early 1990s.

Eimer's first role was as a costume trainee on the film The Secret of Roan Inish. The Irish Independent notes that "the Irish film scene was picking up in the Nineties and Eimer's cv is like a history of Irish film since 1993". During that decade, she worked as assistant costume designer on such productions as the comedy film Widows' Peak, the series Family, the miniseries Scarlett, the historical drama film Michael Collins. and the Neil Jordan film The Butcher Boy.

=== 2000s–present ===
The 2000s were a very productive time with About Adam, Gerry Stembridge's comedy with Kate Hudson, Mad About Mambo, a comedy with Keri Russell, the TV series Rebel Heart, and Jim Sheridan's 2002 biopic In America with Paddy Considine and Samantha Morton. In 2005, Ní Mhaoldomhnaigh was costume designer on the Neil Jordan film Breakfast on Pluto, which featured Cillian Murphy as a transgender woman. The following year, she again worked with Murphy on the drama film The Wind That Shakes the Barley, directed by Ken Loach.

In 2007, she was costume designer on the period drama film Becoming Jane, which was directed by Julian Jarrold and starred Anne Hathaway as Jane Austen.

In 2008 she oversaw the costumes for the film Brideshead Revisited, again directed by Jarrold. Her designs included costumes made in Paris and London, featuring a strong colour palette and sensuous textures. Ní Mhaoldomhnaigh said that she "wanted everything to look beautiful and fresh. Normally with period films you're trying to make things look old and care worn, but there's none of that".

2009 saw her work for the first time with Colin Farrell on Neil Jordan's film Ondine.

2010 saw Eimer reunite with Matthew Goode in the rom com Leap Year which also starred Amy Adams.

At the Gate Theatre in Dublin, Ní Mhaoldomhnaigh was the costume designer for the 2011 stage production Little Women, a stage adaptation of the 1868 novel by Louisa May Alcott. A reviewer in Irish Theatre Magazine praised Ní Mhaoldomhnaigh's efforts, writing that the "costumes are the real visual treat here, with the staid and stately conservatism of Civil War era dress recreated with great detail and grace".

That year, she also created the costumes featured in the 2011 miniseries Neverland, a re-imagining of the Peter Pan story.

Collaborations with Brendan Gleeson continued in both 2011 and 2014 with The Guard and Calvary.

In 2014, Ní Mhaoldomhnaigh oversaw the costumes in the Irish film Jimmy's Hall, her second collaboration with Ken Loach. She received an ITFA nomination for her work in the film.

In 2016, Ní Mhaoldomhnaigh designed the costumes for the period comedy film Love & Friendship. The following year, she created the costumes featured in the BBC miniseries Little Women.

2020 saw Eimer work with Reed Morano on the Barbara Broccoli-produced The Rhythm Section with Blake Lively and Jude Law. And shortly after Eimer had her first foray into science fiction with Foundation for Apple TV.

She was the costume designer for the 2022 Oscar-nominated film, The Banshees of Inisherin, set in an isolated Irish island in the 1920s.

== Selected filmography ==
=== Film ===
Year	Title	Director	Notes
1997	Gold in the Streets	Elizabeth Gill	
2000	About Adam	Gerard Stembridge	
2000	The Most Fertile Man in Ireland	Dudi Appleton	
2000	Mad About Mambo	John Forte	
2002	In America	Jim Sheridan	
2005	Breakfast on Pluto	Neil Jordan	
2006	The Wind That Shakes the Barley	Ken Loach	
2007	Becoming Jane	Julian Jarrold	
2007	Strength and Honour	Mark Mahon	
2008	Brideshead Revisited	Julian Jarrold	
2009	Ondine	Neil Jordan	
2010	Leap Year	Anand Tucker	
2011	The Guard	John Michael McDonagh	
2014	Calvary	John Michael McDonagh	
2014	Jimmy's Hall	Ken Loach	
2016	Love & Friendship	Whit Stillman	
2018	We Have Always Lived in the Castle	Stacie Passon	
2019	The Professor and the Madman	P. B. Shemran	
2019	Battle at Big Rock	Colin Trevorrow	Short film
2020	The Rhythm Section	Reed Morano	
2020	Horizon Line	Mikael Marcimain	
2022	The Banshees of Inisherin	Martin McDonagh	
2023	Freud's Last Session	Matthew Brown	
2023	The Velveteen Rabbit	Jennifer Perrott; Rick Thiele	Short film
2025	The Woman in Cabin 10	Simon Stone	
2026	Wild Horse Nine	Martin McDonagh	Post-production

=== Television ===
Year	Title	Notes
1998	The Ambassador	Episode: "Innocent Passage"
2003	Watermelon	Television film
2004	Proof	3 episodes
2004	Omagh	Television film
2007	Inspector George Gently	Episode: "Gently Go Man"
2011	Neverland	2 episodes
2016	The Fall	6 episodes
2017	Little Women	3 episodes
2021	Foundation	9 episodes
