= The Dead School =

1995 novel by Patrick McCabe

- Author: Patrick McCabe
- Cover artist: Neil Gower
- Language: English
- Genre: Gothic novel, School fiction
- Set in: Ireland and London, 1913–early 1980s
- Publisher: Picador
- Publication date: 1995
- Publication place: Republic of Ireland
- Media type: Print: hardback
- ISBN: 0330339451
- Dewey Decimal: 823.914
- LC Class: PR6063 .C32

The Dead School is a 1995 novel by Irish writer Patrick McCabe.

== Synopsis ==
Set in small-town Ireland, 'The Dead School' tells the intriguing story about two interacting characters: Raphael Bell, an old schoolmaster, and Malachy Dudgeon, a young teacher.

Like other novels by Patrick McCabe, both of the two main characters had troubled childhoods. The intertwining of the two results in the destruction of Raphael and the dramatic change of Malachy.

Malachy Dudgeon comes from a small suburban Irish town, from a dysfunctional family, existing under the guise of happiness, using the facade of happy Sunday mornings, whilst the adulteress mother and suicidal father continue to make devastating blows to their son, from which he never truly recovers, and chooses to escape into his world of imaginations, dreams and Americanisms.

On the other hand, Raphael Bell comes from a small rural Irish town, and is the apparent picture of perfection. Raphael constantly seeks attention, from singing: "Wee Hughie" at any available moment to succeeding at school. However Raphael's world is gravely affected when Black and Tan soldiers shoot his father in the chest before his eyes. From this moment on Raphael strives to uphold the virtues and traditions of old Ireland, and it is inevitably this inability to transgress and adjust into modern living that leads, unsurprisingly to his suicide.

The two protagonists become inextricably linked when Malachy joins the teaching staff at Raphael's prestigious boys boarding school, which he sees as his whole life's worth. An unfortunate science trip leads to the drowning of school boy, Pat Hourican and the unravelling of both Malachy and Raphael. Malachy loses his job, and then his girlfriend, Marion, to a wild member of a rock-band, and Raphael loses his job and mind, and then subsequently his wife, Nessa dies.

Whilst Malachy becomes a waster and alcoholic and moves to London, Raphael opens what he calls 'The Dead School'. With black bin bags at the windows and an uncontrollable amount of mess and disorder. He begins to teach imaginary classes about his own life, as madness becomes inherent in his everyday life.

As the novel concludes, Raphael's suicide occurs, as does his unattended funeral. Malachy returns to his hometown to care for his incapacitated mother, whom he once loathed, and there is a general air of depression, as the golden age of Ireland which Raphael had once loved is exchanged for stripjoints and graffiti. A downright thing.

Throughout the novel the narrator becomes more of a character in his own right, making allusions to his opinions, which constantly change, as the omniscient voice chooses to blame a variety of people for the disastrous events. The colloquial narrative is also crucial in building the narrators persona, and also adds to the idea of base culture, something around which the novel is centered. Many critics have hailed McCabe's novel as a member, or rather cornerstone of the subgenre "Bog Gothic". This refers to the specialist Irish Gothic, which has been penned for McCabe's novels.
