= Twenty One Years =

Single by Dermot Hegarty and his Clubmen

from the album 21 Years
- B-side: "Sing Me Back Home"
- Released: April 1970
- Recorded: 1970
- Genre: Irish traditional
- Length: 2:57
- Label: Release
- Songwriters: Traditional, arr. Plainsmen

Dermot Hegarty and his Clubmen singles chronology
"Gay Galty Mountains" (1969)	"Twenty One Years" (1970)	"I'll Be There" (1971)

"Twenty One Years" is an Irish traditional song by Dermot Hegarty and the Plainsmen.

== Lyrics ==
The singer describes a prison sentence of twenty-one years in HM Prison Dartmoor, and complains that his lover does not write.

== Song history ==
"Twenty One Years" was released in April 1970. It was number 1 on the Irish Singles Chart for five weeks in 1970.
