= Eamonn Owens =

Irish actor

- Born: 18 January 1983 (age 43); Killeshandra, County Cavan, Ireland
- Occupation: Actor
- Years active: 1997–present

Eamonn Owens (born 18 January 1983) is an Irish actor. He has appeared in more than 20 films since 1997. He starred in the 1997 film The Butcher Boy and his performance won him an Honourable Mention at the 48th Berlin International Film Festival.

== Selected filmography ==
- The Butcher Boy (1997)
- Angela's Ashes (1999) (this role was alongside his brother Ciarán Owens)
- St. Patrick: The Irish Legend (2000)
- The Magdalene Sisters (2002)
- The Boys from County Clare (2003)
- Dead Bodies (2003)
- Dorothy Mills (2008)
