= Dead Bodies =

- DVD Cover
- Directed by: Robert Quinn
- Written by: Derek Landy
- Starring: Andrew Scott; Katy Davis; Eamonn Owens; Darren Healy; Kelly Reilly
- Cinematography: Donal Gilligan
- Edited by: Dermot Diskin
- Release date: 25 April 2003
- Running time: 88 minutes
- Country: Ireland
- Language: English

Dead Bodies is a 2003 Irish comedy thriller film by Robert Quinn starring Andrew Scott, Katy Davis, Eamonn Owens, Darren Healy and Kelly Reilly. The screenplay was written by Derek Landy.

It was the first film shot in Ireland on high definition. It was filmed in four and a half weeks in Dublin.

The film premiered in cinemas on 25 April 2003 and was released on DVD on 24 October 2003.

== Plot ==
Tommy McGann (Scott) gets back together with his ex-girlfriend, after breaking up with her recently. But later on, the two fight, in which Tommy leaves the apartment as he pushes her out of his way. He returns later to find her dead, realising he pushed her onto the table where she fell and cracked her head. Tommy drives the body out into the woods and buries it there. Soon after, the police discover the body of not only Tommy's victim, but also someone else whose murderer is still at large.

== Cast ==
- Andrew Scott as Tommy McGann
- Katy Davis as Jean Goodman
- Eamonn Owens as Billy
- Darren Healy as Noel
- Kelly Reilly as Viv McCormack
- Gerard McSorley as Gordon Ellis
- Sean McGinley as Detective Inspector Wheeler

== Awards ==
Dead Bodies was nominated for four IFTA awards and won three: for Best Actor in a Film (Andrew Scott), Best Editing (Dermot Diskin) and Best Sound/Sound Editing (Daniel Birch).
