= John Daly (Irish TV presenter) =

- Occupation: Talk show host

John Daly is a TV presenter and producer. Daly hosts his own BBC Northern Ireland TV talk show, The John Daly Show. Daly is also the producer of the RTÉ talent show The Voice of Ireland.
