= Amú Amigos =

- Starring: Hector Ó hEochagáin
- Country of origin: Ireland
- Original language: Irish

Production
- Camera setup: Single-camera
- Running time: 25 minutes

Original release
- Network: TG4

Amú Amigos is an Irish-language TV travel show with a mainly young audience. Hector travels to various countries, meeting and chatting with the locals in English/Spanish and then explaining to the audience in Irish. His enthusiasm and love for the Irish language has influenced many other programmes on TG4. Each show attracts in the range of 50,000 viewers.

Amú Amigos was followed with other similar series such as:

1. Amú le Hector
2. Hector i Meiriceá
3. Hector san Afraic
4. Hector san Astráil

In one episode of the show, Hector attended a bullfight in Mexico. He claimed that he "loved it" and drew criticism from anti-bloodsports groups.
