= Nightride (film) =

2021 British film

- Theatrical film poster
- Directed by: Stephen Fingleton
- Written by: Ben Conway
- Produced by: Céline Dornier; Paul Kennedy; Jon Silk
- Starring: Moe Dunford; Joana Ribeiro; Gerard Jordan; John Travers; Andrew Simpson; Stephen Rea
- Cinematography: David Bird
- Edited by: Mark Towns
- Music by: Phil Kieran
- Release dates: September 2, 2021 (Toronto); March 4, 2022 (UK)
- Running time: 97 mins.
- Countries: United Kingdom; United States; France
- Language: English

Nightride is a 2021 British-American-French crime thriller film, directed by Stephen Fingleton and written by Ben Conway. It stars Moe Dunford, Joana Ribeiro, Gerard Jordan, John Travers, Andrew Simpson, and Stephen Rea. It premiered at the Toronto International Film Festival in 2021. It later premiered in the UK in 2022.

== Synopsis ==
A real-time, single-shot crime thriller in which a Belfast drug dealer is trying to complete one last job to get out of the business.

== Cast ==
- Moe Dunford as Budge
- Joana Ribeiro as Sofia
- Gerard Jordan as Troy
- John Travers as Lefty
- Andrew Simpson as Felix
- Stephen Rea as Joe
- Ellie O'Halloran as Cuz
- Aaron McCusker as Ringo
- Paul Kennedy as Graham
- Desmond Eastwood as Magic Shop

== Reception ==
On the review aggregator website Rotten Tomatoes, 86% of 21 critics' reviews are positive, with an average rating of 7.10/10. Metacritic, which uses a weighted average, assigned the film a score of 51 out of 100, based on 5 critics, indicating "mixed or average" reviews.

Peter Bradshaw of The Guardian called this film "a lean, taut, one-take gangster thriller", gave it 3/5 stars, and added "Moe Dunford shines". Brandon Zachary of Comic Book Resources lauded Stephen Fingleton's "purposefully stark" direction. Carla Hay of Culture Mix also cited Dunford's "riveting lead performance".

Fionnuala Halligan of Screen Daily noted "it's a heist-tribute to Locke (2013), executed with far fewer narrative strokes". Donald Clarke of The Irish Times remarked, in a 3/5-star review, that "Dunford shines" and the film "just manages to keep its real-time gimmick going". Alex Saveliev of Film Threat gave it a 6/10, stating "the filmmaker does a lot with a little, and for that, he should be given credit".

Richard Crouse, on his website, rated it 3.5 stars and praised Phil Kieran's "atmospheric soundtrack". Josh Bell of Crooked Marquee scored it with a B+, calling it "suspenseful and gripping". Stephen Connolly of Film Ireland said it's "an intense, high-octane thriller". And Declan Burke of the Irish Examiner gave it 4/5 stars, applauding Ben Conway's script for being "a masterclass in how to blend plot and character".

In contrast, Calum Marsh of The New York Times derided the plot as "little more than an assembly of stock-types". Meanwhile, Todd Jorgenson of Cinemalogue chided that "Once the novelty of its technical gimmick wears off, this propulsive British crime thriller turns into a checklist of genre cliches."
