= Capital Letters (film) =

2004 Irish film

- Theatrical film poster
- Directed by: Ciarán O'Connor
- Written by: Ciarán O'Connor
- Produced by: Linda Cardiff; Nuala Cunningham
- Starring: Ruth Negga; Karl Shiels; Jasmine Russell; Niall O'Brien
- Cinematography: Ruairí O'Brien
- Edited by: Mairéad McIvor
- Music by: Niall O'Sullivan
- Release date: July 9, 2004 (Galway)
- Running time: 84 mins.
- Country: Ireland
- Language: English

Capital Letters (a.k.a. Trafficked) is a 2004 Irish crime drama film, written and directed by Ciarán O'Connor. It stars Ruth Negga, Karl Shiels, Jasmine Russell, and Niall O'Brien. It premiered at Galway Film Fleadh in 2004.

== Synopsis ==
Taiwo hopes to make a life for herself and her twin sister in the faraway city of Dublin. Fearing what may await her on her arrival, Taiwo makes a desperate bid for freedom from her Dublin smugglers. However she is hunted down by a petty thief and conman, Keely, who on kidnapping her, decides to tell nobody of his catch and brings the girl home.

== Cast ==
- Ruth Negga as Taiwo
- Karl Shiels as Keely
- Jasmine Russell as Leslie
- Niall O'Brien as McManus
- Martin Dunne as Tony
- Neilí Conroy as Tyana

== Reception ==
Debbie Ging of Estudios Irlandeses lauded writer/director Ciarán O'Connor for making a film that is "an encouraging example of how a powerful message can be delivered about racism and globalisation within a film that is not explicitly about ethnicity or questions of intercultural conflict or coexistence". Stephen Porzio of JOE praised Ruth Negga for her "astounding turn". Patrick O'Connor of Letterboxd commended the film because "Dublin never looked rawer".
