= Patrick McCabe (novelist) =

Irish writer (born 1955)

- Born: 27 March 1955 (age 71); Clones, County Monaghan, Ireland
- Education: St Patrick's College, Dublin
- Occupation: Writer
- Spouse: Margot Quinn
- Children: 2
- Writing career
- Period: Contemporary
- Genre: Black
- Subject: Ireland
- Notable works: The Butcher Boy, Breakfast on Pluto, Winterwood
- Notable awards: Hughes & Hughes/Irish Independent Irish Novel of the Year; 2007
- Movement: Neo-delusional

Patrick McCabe (born 27 March 1955) is an Irish writer. Known for his mostly dark and violent novels set in contemporary—often small-town—Ireland, McCabe has been twice shortlisted for the Booker Prize, for The Butcher Boy (1992) and Breakfast on Pluto (1998), both of which have been made into films.

== Biography ==
McCabe was born in Clones, County Monaghan. He resides in Clones with his artist wife Margot Quinn. Aged 17 he migrated to London and worked as a teacher, returning to Ireland after finding success as a writer.

== Career ==
McCabe's books include The Butcher Boy (1992) and Breakfast on Pluto (1998), both shortlisted for the Booker Prize. He has written a children's book (The Adventures of Shay Mouse) and several of his radio plays have been broadcast by RTÉ and BBC Radio 4. He wrote a collection of linked short stories, Mondo Desperado, published in 1999. The play Frank Pig Says Hello, which he adapted from The Butcher Boy, was first performed at the Dublin Theatre Festival in 1992.

McCabe's 2001 novel Emerald Germs of Ireland is a black comedy featuring matricide. Winterwood, published in 2006, was 2007 Hughes & Hughes/Irish Independent Irish Novel of the Year. 2009 saw the publication of The Holy City. The Stray Sod Country was described as "Strangely elegiac, gloriously operatic and driven by (...) wild and savage imagination, (...) an eerie folk tale that chronicles the passing of a generation."

Director and novelist Neil Jordan has adapted both The Butcher Boy and Breakfast on Pluto into films.

Zelig Theatre premiered the play Appointment in Limbo, written by McCabe, in Galway's Town Hall Theatre in 2008. Cathal Cleary directed.

McCabe and film director Kevin Allen were organisers of the Flatlake Festival, a former music festival that was held annually.

== List of works ==
- The Adventures of Shay Mouse (1985)
- Music on Clinton Street (1986)
- Carn (1989)
- The Butcher Boy (1992)
- The Dead School (1995)
- Breakfast on Pluto (1998)
- Mondo Desperado (1999)
- Emerald Germs of Ireland (2001)
- Call Me the Breeze (2003)
- Winterwood (2006)
- The Holy City (2009)
- The Stray Sod Country (2010)
- The Big Yum Yum (2013) play
- Hello and Goodbye (2013) (contains two short novels: Hello Mr. Bones and Goodbye Mr. Rat)
- The Big Yaroo (2019)
- Poguemahone (2022)
- St. Patrick's Day Forever (Radio play) (2024)
- Little White Lies (2024)
