= The Butcher Boy (novel) =

1992 novel by Patrick McCabe

- Author: Patrick McCabe
- Language: English
- Genre: Novel
- Publisher: Picador
- Publication date: April 1992
- Publication place: Ireland
- Media type: Print (Hardback & Paperback)
- Pages: 224 pp (first edition, hardback)
- ISBN: 0-330-32358-X (first edition, hardback)
- OCLC: 27810121

The Butcher Boy is a 1992 novel by Patrick McCabe.

Set in a small town in Ireland in the early 1960s, it tells the story of Francis "Francie" Brady, a schoolboy who retreats into a violent fantasy world as his troubled home life collapses.

== Plot summary ==
=== Francie's family ===
In the early part of the book it becomes apparent that Francie's mother is frequently abused both verbally and physically by her husband, Benny, a bitter alcoholic. Francie's mother often considers suicide and is committed for a time to a mental hospital.

=== The Nugents ===
Francie seems largely unaware of the trouble at home, and spends the early part of the book in the company of his best friend Joe Purcell, hiding out in a chicken-house and shouting abuse at the fish in the local stream. The two befriend classmate Phillip Nugent, the son of Francie's sanctimonious neighbour, Mrs. Nugent, but end up stealing his comic books. Francie recalls vividly an episode in which Mrs. Nugent hurls a torrent of verbal abuse at Francie's mother, claiming that the Brady family are "a bunch of pigs". Francie takes this insult to heart, and begins to harass the Nugents when they are walking through the town, denying them access through a certain street until they pay the fictional "Pig Toll tax". So begins an unhealthy obsession that underpins the rest of the novel.

=== Alo ===
Word comes that Francie's uncle Alo, who is something of a local celebrity, is coming to town. A party is arranged and most of the town turns up. Alo arrives and sings with his guests late into the night, and Francie observes his uncle with admiration. Eventually the guests leave, and Benny, drunk as usual, launches a verbal assault at his brother, claiming he is a fake and a liar, to the protestation and horror of Francie's mother. Alo is totally dejected and leaves.

Francie is horrified at the treatment of Alo, and runs away from home. He spends some time thieving in Dublin, and when he returns he discovers his mother has committed suicide, for which his father blames him. Again, Francie's mind turns to the Nugents. He attempts to harm Phillip after luring him to the chickenhouse, but Joe stops him. Eventually he breaks into the Nugents' house when they are out and pretends to be a pig, defecating on the floor. The Nugents interrupt him and call the police.

=== Punishment ===
Francie is sent to an 'industrial school' run by priests. During the course of his internment he is molested by one of the priests and befriended by a gardener who claims to have been an Old IRA member and close associate of Michael Collins. He claims to have forgotten all about the Nugents, and is determined to get back to town and resume his carefree friendship with Joe.

On release Francie heads back to town, fully expectant of a friendly welcome by Joe. However he finds it hard to get in touch with his friend, and when he does Joe is reluctant to talk to him. When Francie is attacked by Mrs. Nugent's brother, Buttsy, and his friend Devlin, Joe disowns him.

=== Commission to mental institution ===
Francie gets a job in the local abattoir, impressing the owner with his ability to unflinchingly kill a piglet, and dedicates himself to this job, aiming to make his father proud. He has also begun drinking at weekends with the local drunk, and he goes to clubs with the specific aim of getting into fights. After some months, the police enter his home to discover that his father has been dead for a long time, and Francie is committed to a mental hospital.

After he is released, Francie discovers that Joe is attending boarding school in Bundoran, County Donegal. He decides to go there, and en route he stops off at a boarding house where his father had said he and Francie's mother had spent their honeymoon. He interrogates the landlady, and she informs him that his father had treated his mother terribly for the duration of their honeymoon. Francie resumes his travels and arrives at Joe's school in the middle of the night. He breaks in and, coming face to face with Joe, discovers that his friend has outgrown him and, worse, befriended Phillip Nugent.

=== Murder ===
Francie returns home and resumes his job at the butchers. One day, while on his rounds, he calls at the Nugents' house. Mrs. Nugent answers and Francie forces his way in. He attacks her and shoots her in the head with the butcher's bolt gun. He cuts her open and writes the word 'PIGS' over the walls in an upstairs room with her blood. He puts her into the cart in which he transports the offal and meat-waste, covering her body with the detritus. He casually resumes his rounds and makes his way back to the abattoir, where he is apprehended by the police. He leads them on a wild goose chase for Mrs. Nugent's body, and escapes from them for a time, but he is recaptured and eventually imprisoned after revealing where her dismembered corpse is.

== Style ==
The novel is written in a hybrid of first-person narrative and stream of consciousness, with little punctuation and no separation of dialogue and thought. Guathier, in examining the state of identity in the novel, explains that this style of writing forces the reader to "constantly [reassess] Francie Brady's psychological (in)stability [...] never quite sure to what extent Francie's perceptions are delusions or are incisive commentary on the narrow community in which he lives."

== Themes ==
Like many other contemporary and modern pieces of Irish literature, The Butcher Boy addresses concerns about Ireland's neocolonial status. As Shahriyar Mansouri claims, the novel also examines the rise of a new wave of "decolonizing anarchic formations" in Ireland in the late 1960s and the 1970s, identifying split identity and non-conformism as outcries of a nation colonized by a post-colonial State. Critic Tim Guathier asserts that the crisis of identity which Francie experiences throughout the novel stems from the "unbalanced state" of Ireland and Irish identity. In particular, Guathier emphasizes that the instability of the community during the sixties—a time of rapid change and political violence within Ireland—shapes his dysfunctional family, and Francie's dysfunctional relationships with other characters such as Joe Purcell, and ensures that Francie does not feel part of the larger community, effectively turning him into the "Other".

== Awards ==
The Butcher Boy won the 1992 Irish Times' Irish Literature Prize for Fiction, and was shortlisted for the 1992 Booker Prize.

== Adaptations ==
=== Film ===
The book was adapted into a feature film directed by Neil Jordan in 1997. It starred Eamonn Owens as Francie, Stephen Rea as Benny and Fiona Shaw as Mrs. Nugent. The film was released on DVD on February 13, 2007.

The film won the Silver Berlin Bear award for Best Director at the Berlin Film Festival in 1998 and a Special Mention for Owens' "astonishing lead". It also won the European Film Award for Best Cinematographer for Adrian Biddle.

The adaptation is mostly faithful to the novel, but there are some differences, the principal change being the ending. In the book, Francie is not seen to leave prison, and attempts to forge a friendship with an inmate similar to the one he had with Joe. In the film, a much older Francie is released from prison at the end to be brought to a halfway house. He picks a snowdrop, echoing the opening of the film.

This was the final film produced by Geffen Pictures, which distributed its films through Warner Bros. Pictures.

=== Stage ===
McCabe wrote his own stage adaptation of the novel, entitled "Frank Pig Says Hello," which debuted on 6 October 1992. The play is written for two actors.

In 2022, the Irish Repertory Theatre presented the world premiere production of a musical based on the novel, which featured book, music, and lyrics by Asher Muldoon.

== See also ==
- The Butcher Boy (soundtrack) composed by Elliot Goldenthal, a frequent Neil Jordan collaborator
- List of winners and shortlisted authors of the Booker Prize for Fiction
