= Triage (disambiguation) =

Triage is a process of prioritizing patients based on the severity of their condition.

Triage may also refer to:

== Methodologies ==
- Field triage, decision-making early in the medical prioritization process
- Business triage, commercial evaluation
- Bug triage, software engineering
- Ecological triage, used in evaluating potential environment interventions
- Requirements triage, the process of prioritizing requirements in software development

== Cultural manifestations ==
- Triage (novel), a 1998 novel by Scott Anderson
  - Triage (film), a 2009 film adaptation of the novel
- Triage (David Baerwald album), 1992
- Triage (Methyl Ethel album), 2019
- Triage (character), a character from the X-Men comics franchise
