= Richard Hobbs (ecologist) =

Australian ecologist

Richard J. Hobbs FAA, is an Emeritus Professor, ARC former Australian Laureate Fellow and ecologist at the University of Western Australia, Perth, Australia. He is a fellow of the Australian Academy of Science and a Highly-Cited author who has written extensively in the areas of vegetation dynamics and management, ecosystem fragmentation, ecosystem rehabilitation and restoration, landscape ecology, and conservation biology. His research focused on managing ecosystems in a rapidly changing world and the implications of environmental and biological change for conservation and restoration.

== Academic career ==
An alumnus of Edinburgh University, Scotland, Richard obtained a 1st class honours in Ecological Science in 1976. He secured a Fulbright Scholarship to the University of California Santa Barbara, USA where he completed a master's degree in 1977. He completed his PhD at the University of Aberdeen, Scotland in 1982, working on post-fire dynamics of heathland communities, supervised by Prof Charles Gimingham.

His first postdoctoral research position was at Stanford University, working with Hal Mooney on serpentine grassland dynamics.

In 1984, he joined the CSIRO Division of Wildlife & Ecology in Western Australia and worked on the dynamics of fragmented ecosystems in the Western Australian wheatbelt, becoming the Officer in Charge of the Western Australian laboratory in 1997.

In 2000, he took up a Chair in Environmental Science at Murdoch University and was awarded an ARC Australian Professorial Fellowship in 2006.

Moving to the University of Western Australia in 2009, he was awarded an Australian Laureate Fellowship by the Australian Research Council for research into "Intervention ecology: managing ecosystems in the 21st century".

He retired from UWA in 2020 and retains an honorary research position there. His current activity focuses on researching and writing for the website The Nature of Music, which examines the sustainability and conservation issues associated with the materials for guitar-making.

== Public and Professional Roles ==
- President, Ecological Society of Australia 1998-1999
- President, International Association for Landscape Ecology 1999-2003
- Member, Scientific Advisory Committee, Worldwide Fund for Nature (Australia) 1997-2004
- Member, Invasive Species Specialist Group, IUCN Species Survival Commission
- Member, ARC Expert Advisory Panel (Engineering and Environment) 2001-2002
- Member, Board of Governors, Society for Ecological Restoration International 2003-2004
- Member, Wilderness Society Wildcountry Science Council 2003-2009
- Member, ARC College of Experts 2004-2005
- Member, Natural Heritage Trust Advisory Committee 2004-2007
- Member, Editorial Board, Ecological Management and Restoration 1999-2010
- Editor in Chief, Restoration Ecology 2005-2014
- Member, Editorial Advisory Board, Landscape Ecology, from 2006
- Founding Member, Leeuwin Group of Concerned Scientists. 2015-present
- Member, Beeliar Group: Professors for Environmental Responsibility. 2017-present
- Member, Perth Urban Restoration Science Advisory Group 2017-2020

== Awards ==
- Fellow of the Australian Academy of Science
- ISI Highly Cited Researcher in Ecology and Environment
- Distinguished Scholarship Award, 1999, International Association for Landscape Ecology
- Finalist, 2001 Eureka Awards (The Royal Botanic Gardens Sydney Eureka Prize for Biodiversity Research)
- Australian Laureate Fellowship, 2009
- Winner, 2011 Western Australian Scientist of the Year
- Ecological Society of Australia, 2010 Gold Medal Recipient
- Ecological Society of America, Honorary Member 2016
- Inductee, Western Australian Science Hall of Fame 2021
- British Ecological Society, Honorary Member, 2022
- Academic Writing Residency, Rockefeller Institute Bellagio Centre, Italy 2022

== Selected publications ==
- Hobbs, R.J. & Suding, K.N. (eds.) 2009. New Models for Ecosystem Dynamics and Restoration. Island Press, Washington D.C.
- Suding, K.N. & Hobbs, R.J. 2009. Threshold models in conservation and restoration: A developing framework. Trends in Ecology and Evolution 24(5):271-279
- Jackson, S.T. & Hobbs, R.J. 2009. Ecological restoration in the light of ecological history. Science 325(5940):567-569.
- Hobbs, R.J., Higgs, E. & Harris, J.A. 2009. Novel ecosystems: implications for conservation and restoration. Trends in Ecology and Evolution 24(11):599-605
- Lindenmayer, D.B., Bennett, A.F. & Hobbs, R.J. (eds) 2010. Temperate woodland conservation and management. CSIRO Publishing, Melbourne.
- Hobbs, R.J., Cole, D.N., Yung, L., Zavaleta, E.S., Aplet, G.H., Chapin, F.S.III, Landres, P.B., Parsons, D.J., Stephenson, N.L., White, P.S., Graber, D.M., Higgs, E.S., Millar, C.I., Randall, J.M., Tonnessen, K.A. & Woodley, S. 2010. Guiding concepts for parks and wilderness stewardship in an era of global environmental change. Frontiers in Ecology and the Environment 8(9):483-490.
- Hobbs, R.J., Hallett, L.M., Ehrlich, P.R. & Mooney, H.A. 2011. Intervention ecology: applying ecological science in the 21st century. BioScience 61(6):442-450

For a full publication list, see Google Scholar: Richard J Hobbs
