= Joy Zedler =

American ecologist

Joy B. Zedler
- Born: 1943 (age 82–83)
- Scientific career
- Fields: Restoration ecology; wetland ecology; adaptive management
- Workplaces: University of Wisconsin–Madison

Joy Buswell Zedler (born 1943) is an American ecologist and professor of botany at the University of Wisconsin–Madison (UW), holding the title of Aldo Leopold Chair of Restoration Ecology. In addition to restoration ecology, she specializes in the ecology of wetlands, rare species, interactions between native and introduced species, and adaptive management.

== Career ==
After earning a PhD in botany at UW, Zedler in 1969 moved to San Diego, California, as her husband took a job at San Diego State University (SDSU). She became an SDSU faculty member and joined activist Mike McCoy in preventing the Tijuana River Estuary from being developed into a marina. She formed SDSU's Pacific Estuarine Research Laboratory.

In 1998, Zedler became the Aldo Leopold Professor of Restoration Ecology at UW. Zedler credited Leopold, who also worked at UW, with pioneering restoration ecology.

She also in 1998 became director of research for the UW Arboretum. She served in this capacity for 18 years, launching studies into invasive species, including how native plants can defend their ecosystems. She was the co-author of a 2010s plan to restore the Mesopotamian Marshes.

Zedler has said that the most immediate impact of wetland destruction—in which "most losses are due to drainage for agriculture"—is a lower denitrification rate, which may raise the level of nitrates in water over the amount safe for children and pregnant women. She has noted that even after wetland restoration efforts, much of the abundance and biodiversity cannot fully recover from damage.

A fellow of the Society of Wetland Scientists and the Ecological Society of America, Zedler edits the journals Restoration Ecology and Ecosystem Health and Sustainability. She is a former member of the board of directors of The Nature Conservancy, the Environmental Defense Fund, and the Wisconsin State Natural Areas Preservation Council.

== Honors ==
- 2001 – William A. Niering Outstanding Educator Award, Coastal and Estuarine Research Federation
- Zedler Marsh, part of Los Cerritos Wetlands, is named in her honor.

== Selected publications ==
=== Journal articles ===
- Zedler, Joy B. (October 1, 2000). "Progress in wetland restoration ecology" (PDF). Trends in Ecology & Evolution. 15 (10): 402–407. doi:10.1016/S0169-5347(00)01959-5. PMID 10998517.
- Zedler, Joy B.; Kercher, Suzanne (September 1, 2004). "Causes and consequences of invasive plants in wetlands: opportunities, opportunists, and outcomes". Critical Reviews in Plant Sciences. 23 (5). Taylor & Francis: 431–452. Bibcode:2004CRvPS..23..431Z. doi:10.1080/07352680490514673. S2CID 1837791.
- Zedler, Joy B.; Kercher, Suzanne (November 11, 2005). "Wetland resources: status, trends, ecosystem services, and restorability". Annual Review of Environment and Resources. 30: 39–74. doi:10.1146/annurev.energy.30.050504.144248.

=== Books ===
- Zedler, Joy B. (1996). Tidal Wetland Restoration: A Scientific Perspective and Southern California Focus. California Sea Grant College System, University of California. ISBN 9781888691023.
- Zedler, Joy B. (2000). Handbook for Restoring Tidal Wetlands. CRC Press. ISBN 9781420036619.
- Palmer, Margaret A.; Zedler, Joy B.; Falk, Donald A., eds. (2016). Foundations of Restoration Ecology. Island Press. ISBN 9781610916981.
- Zedler, Joy B. (2016). The Ecology of Tijuana Estuary, California: A National Estuarine Research Reserve (Classic Reprint). Fb&c Limited. ISBN 9781334311000.
