= Sussex Academic Press =

British book publishing company

- Founded: 1994; 31 years ago
- Country of origin: United Kingdom
- Headquarters location: Eastbourne
- Key people: Anthony Grahame (editorial director)
- Publication types: Books
- Nonfiction topics: Humanities and Social Sciences
- Imprints: The Alpha Press
- Official website: www.sussex-academic.com (United Kingdom)

Sussex Academic Press, founded in 1994, is a publishing company based in Eastbourne, East Sussex, United Kingdom. It initially specialised in Middle East studies.

The house published books on issues of contemporary relevance and debate in Middle East topics, Theology & Religion, History (especially Portuguese, Spanish and Huguenot history), and Literary Criticism, as well as Latin American, First Nations, and Asian studies.

Its series on the Portuguese-Speaking World: Its History, Politics and Culture is under the editorship of António Costa Pinto, Onésimo T. Almeida and Miguel Bandeira Jerónimo.

In 2022, Liverpool University Press (LUP) announced its acquisition of Sussex Academic Press as part of its digital publishing strategy, allowing it access to Sussex Academic Press's 1,000-book backlist.

== Authors and publications ==
- Bel, Germà (2012): Infrastructure and the political economy of nation building in Spain 1720–2010
- Blocksidge, Martin (2013): The banker poet: the rise and fall of Samuel Rogers, 1763–1855
- Britton, R. K. (2019): Don Quixote and the Subversive Tradition of Golden Age Spain
- Graham, Helen (2014): The War and Its Shadow: Spain's Civil War in Europe's Long Twentieth Century
- Jordan, Bill (2001): Who Cares for Planet Earth?: The Con in Conservation
- Laskier, Michael M., & Ronen Yitzhak (2023): Israel and the Mediterranean: Five Decades of Uneasy Coexistence
- Lowe, Sid (2010). Catholicism, War and the Foundation of Francoism: The Juventud De Acción Popular in Spain, 1931-1939
- Petersen, Tore T. (2009): Richard Nixon, Great Britain and the Anglo-American Alignment in the Persian Gulf and Arabian Peninsula: Making Allies out of Clients
- Purcell, Hugh & Smith, Phyll (2012): The Last English Revolutionary: Tom Wintringham 1898-1949
- Shapira, Anita et al. (2014): The Nation State and Immigration
- Smith, Donna (2012): Sex, Lies and Politics: Gay Politicians and the Press
- Townson, Nigel, ed. (2015): Is Spain Different? A Comparative Look at the 19th and 20th Centuries
- Vigne, Randolph, & Charles Littleton (2001): From Strangers to Citizens: The Integration of Immigrant Communities in Britain, Ireland and Colonial America, 1550–1750
