= William Jordan =

William, Will, Bill, or Billy Jordan may refer to:

== Politicians ==
- William Jordan (MP for Sandwich) (fl. 1381–1391), member of parliament (MP) for Sandwich
- William Jordan (died 1720), MP for Reigate
- Hamilton Jordan (William Hamilton Jordan, 1944–2008), American politician, chief of staff to President Carter
- William E. Jordan (1883–1953), American politician, socialist state legislator from Milwaukee, Wisconsin
- Bill Jordan (politician) (1879–1959), New Zealand diplomat and politician, MP and high commissioner
- William Worthington Jordan (1849–1886), South African trader, founder of the Boer republic of Upingtonia
- William H. Jordan (California politician) (1849–1939), speaker of the California State Assembly

== Sports ==
- Hen Jordan (William Henry Jordan, 1894–1948), American baseball player
- William Jordan (rower) (1898–1968), American Olympic gold medalist rower
- Billy Jordan (1908/09–2000), Irish professional footballer
- Bill Jordan (Australian footballer) (1906–1995), Australian rules footballer
- Bill Jordan (American football), college football player and coach
- Will Jordan (rugby union) (William Thomas Jordan, born 1998), New Zealand rugby union player
- Willie Jordan (William Charles Jordan, 1885–1949), English footballer

== Writers ==
- William R. Jordan III (born 1944), American botanist and journalist
- William B. Jordan (1940–2018), American art historian
- William Chester Jordan (born 1948), American medieval historian
- William George Jordan (1864–1928), American editor and essayist
- William Jordan (writer) (fl. 1611), Cornish writer and dramatist

== Others ==
- William Jordan (actor) (born 1937), American television and film actor, star of 1978 television series Project UFO
- Bill Jordan (American lawman) (1911–1997), U.S. Marine, Border Patrol officer, gun writer
- William II Jordan (died 1109), crusader baron, count of Berga and Cerdanya, regent of the County of Tripoli
- Bill Jordan, Baron Jordan (born 1936), British economist and trade unionist
- Bill Jordan (outdoorsman), American camouflage designer
- William H. Jordan (merchant) (1845/46–1923), American herring merchant from Gloucester, Massachusetts
- William Lancelot Jordan (1896–1931), South African WWI flying ace

== See also ==
- Will Jordan (1927–2018), American actor and impressionist
- William Jorden (1923–2009), William John Jorden, American reporter and diplomat
- William Jordyn (disambiguation)
