= Jordyn =

Jordyn is a given name and surname, a spelling variant of Jordan.

Notable people with the name include:

== Given name ==
- Jordyn Adams (born 1999), American baseball player
- Jordyn Allen (born 2000), Australian rules footballer
- Jordyn Barratt (born 1998), American skateboarder and surfer
- Jordyn Brooks (born 1997), American football player
- Jordyn Bruce (born 1998), American heptathlete
- Jordyn Burns (born 1992), American hockey player
- Jordyn Holzberger (born 1993), Australian field hockey player
- Jordyn Huitema (born 2001), Canadian soccer player
- Jordyn Listro (born 1995), Canadian soccer player
- Jordyn Poulter (born 1997), American volleyball player
- Jordyn Sheerin (born 1989), Scottish footballer
- Jordyn Tyson (born 2004), American football player
- Jordyn Woods (born 1997), American model and entrepreneur
- Jordyn Wieber (born 1995), American artistic gymnast

== Surname ==
- William Jordyn (disambiguation), multiple people
