= Restoration economy =

Economic activity associated with regenerative land use

The restoration economy is the economic activity associated with regenerative land use, such as ecological restoration activities. It stands in contrast to economic activity premised on sprawl, or on the extraction or depletion of natural resources. The term is meant to convey that activities meant to repair past damage to natural and human communities are often economically beneficial at local, regional, and national scales.

== Overview ==
The "restoration economy" refers to an economic model based on repurposing, renewing and reconnecting the natural, built and socioeconomic environments. The phrase gained popularity with the publication in 2002 of The Restoration Economy by Storm Cunningham. That book created an eight-sector taxonomy for "restorative development", with a chapter on each. Four professional / technical / scientific sectors primarily focused on the built environment: brownfield remediation, infrastructure renewal, heritage restoration and catastrophe reconstruction. The other four sectors primarily focused on the natural environment: ecological restoration, watershed restoration, fishery restoration and regenerative agriculture. All eight sectors help to revitalize the socioeconomic environment.

On the natural resources side of the equation, the "restoration economy" refers to the employment, capital, resources, and economic activity that emerge from investments in ecological restoration, or "the process of assisting the recovery of an ecosystem that has been degraded, damaged, or destroyed." Restoration projects can include habitat enhancement, water quality improvement, invasive species removal, forest thinning for canopy diversification, or any other activity that aims to improve the natural function of an ecosystem. While investments in restoration benefit the environment, restoration projects also require workers, materials, and services to implement. The marketplace for these goods and services can create employment, spur business and workforce development, and increase activity in local economies. Activities that use byproducts of restoration work are also sometimes considered as part of the restoration economy; for example, the use of small trees and/or shrubs from forest diversification or thinning projects as biomass to produce heat or energy.

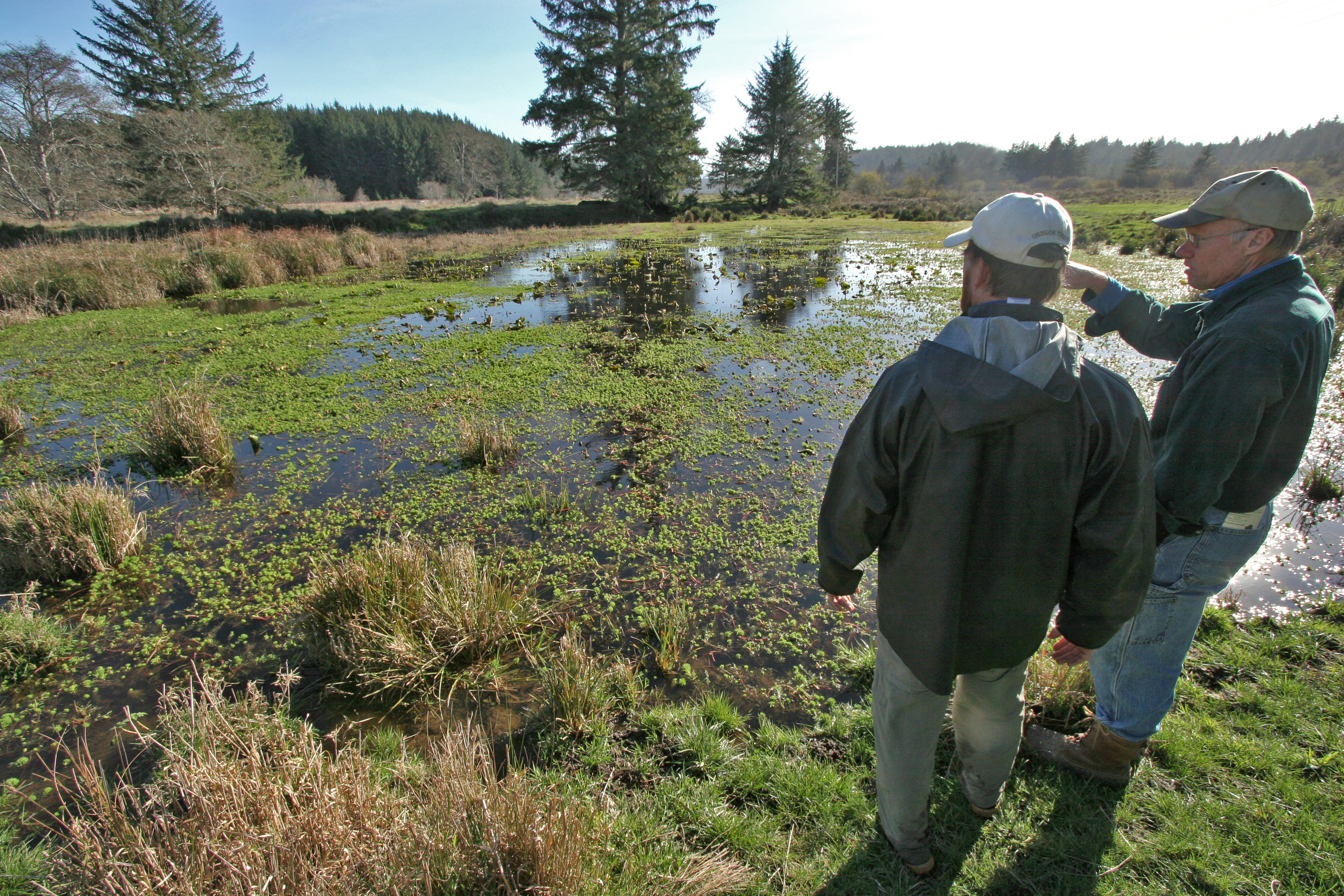
Wetland area restoration

== History ==
The emergence of the restoration economy as a concept followed closely from historic shifts in natural resource policy in the mid-1990s, when the northern spotted owl and several species of salmon with habitat in the Pacific Northwest of North America were listed as endangered. The listings created a significant shift in forest management policies across the region, leading to drastic decreases in logging and other natural resource extraction activities that would further destroy habitats for these species. The listings also marked a shift toward more sustainable land management through forest and watershed restoration, as policymakers began to realize that environmental restoration work could provide social and economic, in addition to ecological, benefits.

Federal and state agencies sought to replace some of the economic activity that was lost as extraction activities declined with economic activity from restoration work. The Northwest Forest Plan (1994) initiated several programs intended to transition traditional logging communities and workforces toward livelihoods in restoration work. The Collaborative Forest Landscape Restoration Act (2009), the National Forest Economic Action Plan, and stewardship contracting opportunities also focus on marrying ecological with socioeconomic benefits from national forest management.

In Oregon, decreased timber yields and the potential for additional salmon listings that would further affect traditional land management activities led to the creation of community-based watershed councils under the Oregon Watershed Health Program (1993), and later the Oregon Plan for Salmon and Watersheds (1997). With dedicated state lottery funding, these watershed councils continue to promote voluntary restoration actions that improve salmon habitat by encouraging collaboration at the local level and promoting both socioeconomic and ecological benefits through restoration.

== Businesses, employees, and working conditions ==
Agencies and nongovernmental organizations that implement restoration work create employment by hiring staff and contracting with businesses that hire employees to perform the actual restoration work. In Oregon, contracting businesses involved in restoration projects tend to be small businesses (as defined by the Small Business Administration), family-owned, and subject to large seasonal fluctuations in available work. Differences among businesses in the state appear to be related to customer base—businesses that work for non-federal customers such as watershed councils tend to perform more equipment-based work close to their home, versus businesses working for federal agencies who tend to travel more often and perform more labor-intensive work. These findings have important implications, as restoration investments are frequently intended to increase economic activity in rural communities affected by decreased logging activity, and these benefits are lost to local economies if contractors from outside of the area capture the contract. In addition, labor-intensive activities (e.g. planting trees, thinning) tend to pay less than traditional logging jobs, be less reliable, and be dominated by immigrant workers. In equipment-based and technically intensive restoration activities, working conditions are generally thought to be better.

== Measuring economic activity ==
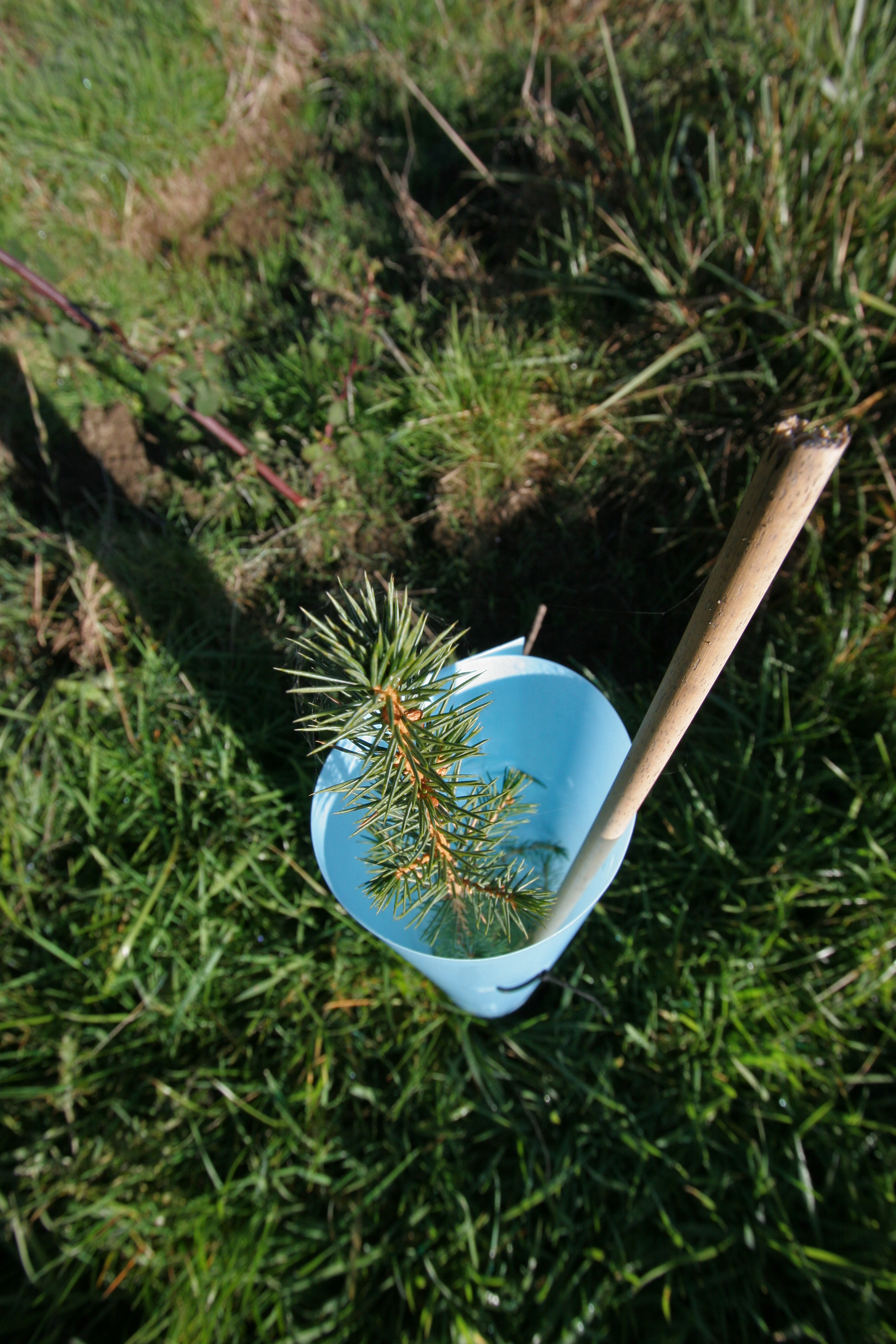
Adding protection to saplings for a healthy and ensured growth

=== United States ===
Several studies have examined the economic impacts and activity created by restoration work in numbers. These have typically been for individual projects, e.g. a large hazardous fuels reduction contract in Arizona, or a $113 million mine reclamation project in Montana that was estimated to generate a total of 3,563 full-time equivalent (FTE) positions. A study looking at the economic out of a restoration program across an entire county (Humboldt County, California) determined that the $12.5 million invested in the program in 2002 supported 300 direct jobs that year. A study that looked at investments in restoration projects through both federal agencies and nongovernmental organizations across the state of Oregon found that restoration investments have similar economic and employment impacts as other public infrastructure projects such as road building. Per million invested, 15-24 jobs were created, and each invested dollar generated an additional 1.4 to 2.4 dollars in economic activity as it cycled through the economy, depending on the specific type of project.

Workers, or restoration practitioners, in the restoration economy are also vulnerable to policy changes, and the "volatility of restoration funding." In Humboldt County, California, private sector businesses and non-governmental organizations are often compromising with bureaucratic hindrances and drastic changes in funding.

=== South Africa ===
Restoration economy has been implemented in South Africa as well. For example, the ARISE Project in the Giyani district of the Limpopo province, was a poverty-alleviation program contracted to a private company in 1999 by the Department of Environmental Affairs and Tourism, with the intention of raising the overall quality of life in that region. The program created jobs in ecological restoration of the surrounding landscape and helped to economically empower rural Africans in the short run. Restoration activities included creating fences around off-limit areas, planting approximately 8000 trees and creating a fifty-meter buffer zone on both sides of the Klein Letaba River. Over 323 jobs were created, and employees were earning nearly twice the average daily income ($5.30 per household from $2.20). In South Africa, while the ARISE project was able to positively affect the Giyani District by providing jobs for a short period to low-income earners, it did not increase the likelihood of long employment later in the commercial sector.

=== Namibia ===
In its efforts to control woody plant encroachment, the Namibian government deliberately supports the commercial utilisation of excess wood as an eocomic incentive and pull factor for restoration. This has resulted in the emergence of a so-called bush-biomass sector, boasting various different value chains. At the core of Namibia´s restoration economy approach is the sustainable harvesting of shrubs. Such harvesting is meant to reduce the density woody plants and allow for a better between grass and bushes in the affected savanna rangelands. A total of over 12,000 workers find employment in harvesting and processing of excess wood. It was estimated that the bush control and utilisation could lead to an aggregated net benefit of around USD 3.8 billion over a time period of 25 years, taking into consideration .

== Ongoing benefits ==
Although the potential exists for a win-win situation pairing environmental betterment with socioeconomic benefits, the dual-benefits potential from this kind of work is often overlooked or under-emphasized. Like its emergence from policy with aims to provide socioeconomic benefits in concert with natural resource work, a robust and enduring restoration economy depends on policy that continues to prioritize multiple benefits for both human and natural systems, in addition to initiating investments in restoration activities. Indices of performance and knowledge of the traits associated with successful establishment and persistence in restored vegetation are potentially of great benefit to practitioners and policymakers involved in restoration increased land productivity, enhanced groundwater recharge, woody utilisation and carbon offsets.

== See also ==
- Restoration ecology
- Northwest Forest Plan
- Ecosystem services
- Green economy
