= Scott Anderson (writer) =

American novelist and journalist (born 1959)

- Born: 1959 (age 66–67)
- Education: University of Iowa
- Occupations: Author; investigative journalist; war correspondent
- Spouse: Nanette Burstein
- Writing career
- Genres: Non-fiction; Fiction

Scott Anderson (born 1959) is an American writer, novelist, non-fiction author, and war correspondent. He has authored non-fiction books including Lawrence in Arabia, The Man Who Tried to Save the World, and War Zones, as well as the novels Triage and Moonlight Hotel. He is a frequent contributor to the New York Times Magazine, GQ, Esquire, Men's Journal, Vanity Fair and other publications.

== Early life and education ==
Anderson was born in Sebastopol, California and he has a brother and three sisters. His brother is the author Jon Lee Anderson, and his sister Michelle is also a writer. He grew up in East Asia, primarily in Taiwan and Korea, where his father was an agricultural advisor for the American government. When asked about his father's experience and how this relates to his own career, in a 2006 interview with New York magazine, Anderson said "I saw his frustrations with projects that were often just boondoggles mandated by the government." After spending a year traveling from Europe to India with his father, Anderson went to high school in Gainesville, Florida. He received an M.F.A in Creative Writing from the University of Iowa Writer's Workshop.

== Career ==
Anderson pursued a writing career at the age of nineteen. He was working in a governmental job in Washington and thinking about the possibility of attending college when, he describes, one weekend having an idea to write a novel. The next week he quit his job, ended his engagement to his then fiancée, and set out to become a writer. Anderson would do menial jobs like fruit-picking and bartending, to support himself financially until he gained success with his writing.

=== Books ===
==== Non-fiction ====
Anderson has co-authored two non-fiction books with his brother Jon Lee Anderson. Inside the League was published in 1986 by Dodd Mead. The book tells the story of how Nazi leaders, and other leaders of other fascist organisations, switched allegiances to join the political World Anti-Communist League. Anderson and Anderson write that the organisation, founded in 1952, developed warfare methods including "assassinations, death squads, and sabotage throughout the world" which were, they argue, adopted from the Nazis. Scott Anderson's second book, co-authored with Jon Lee Anderson, called War Zones was published in 1988 also by Dodd Mead. The authors provide anecdotal evidence, observations and protestations from those experiencing violent conflicts in El Salvador, Northern Ireland, Uganda, Sri Lanka, and Israel.

Scott Anderson's first solo published book was The 4 O'clock Murders: The True Story of a Mormon Family's Vengeance in 1994 by Doubleday. In this book, Anderson tells the true story of four murders carried out in 1988 in Texas by a self-proclaimed Mormon prophet, Heber LeBaron of the Church of the Firstborn. Anderson's next book concerned the disappearance of Fred Cuny, entitled The Man Who Tried to Save the World: The Dangerous Life and Mysterious Disappearance of Fred Cuny, first published in 1999 by Doubleday. Anderson's next book was Lawrence in Arabia: War, Deceit, Imperial Folly and the Making of the Modern Middle East first published in 2013 by Doubleday. It tells the story of the Arab Revolt against the Turks in the First World War, and the role T. E. Lawrence played, a British archaeologist, who became head of the Arab enemy and battled the imperialist ambitions of his nation-state. In 2017, Anderson published the book Fractured Lands: How the Arab World Came Apart giving an account of the Arab Spring, and Anderson argues, the origins of which can be traced back to America's invasion of Iraq in 2003. The Quiet Americans, first published in 2020 by Doubleday, explores the roles of four American spies (Michael Burke, Frank Wisner, Peter Sichel and Edward Lansdale) during the Cold War. In 2025, Penguin Random House published Anderson's King of Kings, which chronicled the history of the Iranian Revolution. The book won the Kirkus Prize for Nonfiction in 2025.

==== Fiction ====
Scott Anderson has published two fiction novels. The first is 1998 novel Triage telling the story of a war photographer Mark and the psychological effects of his work. His second novel Moonlight Hotel, published in 2006, is about mid-level diplomat David Richards based in the Middle Eastern kingdom of Kutar in 1983. When civil war breaks out, Richards, along with fellow expatriates, holds up in Moonlight Hotel to survive the conflict.

=== War correspondence ===
Scott Anderson initially wanted to be an author of fiction, and his first pursuit into war reporting occurred in 1983. Anderson had been travelling around Europe and had heard about stringers and wished to find out more, he was suggested by someone in an Associated Press office in Greece, to travel to Beirut. The Mountain War, as part of the ongoing Lebanese Civil War, had broken out in the Summer of 1983 just before Anderson left for Beirut to report on events.

Anderson's career as a published war correspondent began in 1994 with an article in the New York Times about violence as a result of the Troubles in Northern Ireland. For the article, Anderson travelled to Northern Ireland regularly for years before publication to gain a glimpse into "the Belfast underworld" and meet members of the Provisional IRA, for instance. Anderson would go on to write another article for The New York Times and Harper's Magazine in 1994 about the situation in Northern Ireland. During the 1990s, Anderson reported on Fred Cuny, an American humanitarian working in conflict and disaster zones who disappeared in 1995, as well as the Bosnian War, and situation in Albania as a result of war in Kosovo in 1999.

In 2001, Anderson travelled to Turkey to report on the Turkish hunger strike in prisons which occurred within the backdrop of the Turkish economic crisis, for The New York Times Magazine. During the 2000s, Anderson repeatedly reported on the Israeli-Palestinian conflict. He also covered tensions in the Middle East, including War in Darfur and the disarmament of Libya. In 2011, Anderson published an article for Esquire, detailing his experience (alongside Sebastian Junger and John Faulk) in Bosnia when the CIA were hunting for Ratko Mladic, a former Bosnian military officer and convicted war criminal.

In a 2017 interview, Anderson describes becoming a parent as having affected his decision to limit active war reporting, saying he has a "moral responsibility" to stay safe for his child.

=== Journalism ===
Anderson's investigative journalism has also covered other socio-economic, cultural and political issues, outside of war and conflict. This focal shift is most notable in Anderson's published articles from the late 2000s onwards. Anderson continued to cover international issues, for instance, in 2007 he wrote about the experience of those living on the Panamanian island of Coiba with high murder rates and gangs. In 2008, Anderson discussed the issue of suicide and poor mental health in America, and a 2012 article featured his interview with Greg Ousley, who murdered his parents at the age of fourteen in 1993, and explored the debate around long prison sentences for juveniles.

Anderson's journalism has covered the topics of national security, central intelligence (particularly the CIA's involvement in the Middle East), law enforcement and migrant crossings.

=== Bar ===
Since 2000, Anderson co-owned bar-restaurant The Half King, in New York City, with wife Nanette Burstein and fellow journalist Sebastian Junger until it closed in January 2019. The Half King was known for hosting readings, screenings and photography exhibits to encourage people interested in writing, publishing and filmmaking.

== Reception ==
In a review of Inside the League, Larry Ceplair for Los Angeles Times criticised the authors saying that they did not give the subject matter "the treatment it merits." In his negative review, Ceplair opined "the title is misleading, the subtitle naïve, and the narrative structure dubious. Their [Anderson and Anderson] disconnected, anecdotal, and largely undocumented indictment of the World Anti-Communist League does not support their claim."

Publishers Weekly described Anderson as providing "a riveting, dark history [...] in copious, sometimes numbing detail, but always with a tart tongue" in The 4 O'clock Murders.

Reviews for The Man Who Tried to Save the World: The Dangerous Life and Mysterious Disappearance of Fred Cuny were mainly positive. Publishers Weekly said that "Anderson does an admirable job of searching for the truth in a land that truth forgot" and whilst the review remarked that "not even Anderson's intrepid reporting and formidable storytelling skills can bring clarity to the case of Fred Cuny" it says "this is the fault of circumstances rather than of the author." The New York Times Book Review said it was "a mystery story, straight out of a plot from John LeCarré." The New York Observer wrote "One of the most important books to be published since the fall of the Berlin Wall...A great, epic mystery of our day."

Anderson's novel Triage received positive critical reception. Christopher Dickey The New York Times described it as "haunting" with "Hemingwayesque" landscapes and characters with consciences "straight out of Graham Greene", but Dickey adds "I wish Anderson's design for this novel were a little less schematic." Susan Salter Reynolds, for the Los Angeles Times, said the novel is "thrilling" but found the main character Mark irritating, "one of those cowboys addicted to war zones" and found some of plot "a romantic idea, found only in books." The Washington Post, in a review by David Nicholson, said this is "a serious book about a serious subject" and that Anderson "understands the seriousness of love and life" in the novel.

Moonlight Hotel was described by Alan Furst, in a review for The New York Times, as a "sharp and finely observed political novel" and Furst opines "dire authenticity in every tactical move in this novel — Anderson knows exactly what he's talking about." Publishers Weekly said "Though Anderson demonstrates more skill with plot and geopolitical analysis than characterization, he has produced a smart, polished, proto-Syriana page-turner." A review by The Washington Post Book World said it is "A tour de force, variously satire, allegory, romance, [and] war novel. . . . Elegantly written, ferociously imagined."

Lawrence in Arabia was a national bestseller and met with positive critical reception. Alex von Tunzelmann, writing for The New York Times, said that Anderson "gives Lawrence's story a new spin by contextualising him in a group biography." Tunzelmann also writes "a fine storyteller, Anderson does his best to drum up a narrative for his American character but is ultimately defeated by the modesty of the man's achievements." Christopher de Bellaigue wrote for The Guardian that "Anderson is a bleak but fair-minded historian, alive to the cynicism and prejudice that decided actions on all sides." Bellaigue ends his review stating "In his well-constructed demolition of Britain's "amateurs", Anderson neglects the paradox that Lawrence, an archaeologist who never received a day's military training, a scholar and an aesthete amid the blood and guts, was the greatest amateur of them all." In a review Ian Thomson for The Observer said "Scott Anderson's account of the Arab revolt and the life of TE Lawrence is both scholarly and highly readable." Mahon Murphy, historian and research fellow, in a review for the London School of Economics and Political Science, said it is a "vivid attempt" to understand the conflict in the Middle East but questions Anderson's choice to focus on Lawrence. The New York Times, in a review by Janet Maslin, described the book as "richly detailed" and said it is "a fascinating book, the best work of military history in recent memory and an illuminating analysis of issues that still loom large today." Michael Dirda, for The Washington Post, said it "Cuts through legend and speculation to offer perhaps the clearest account of Lawrence's often puzzling actions and personality."

The Quiet Americans was met with mostly positive reviews. Kevin Peraino, for The New York Times, described it as "enthralling" and said concludes "Anderson's narrative is certainly entertaining, but he is no confectioner, and the dark, poignant tale he tells is far the better for it." In a review for The Washington Post, Beverly Gage described Anderson as a "sympathetic" narrator and said it tells "a story at once sweeping in its scope and fascinating in its particulars."

=== Film adaptations ===
The 2009 drama film Triage starring Colin Farrell, Paz Vega and Sir Christopher Lee, is based on his novel. The 2007 movie The Hunting Party starring Richard Gere and Terrence Howard, is partially based on his work in Bosnia.

=== Controversy ===
In a September 2009 issue of GQ, Anderson wrote an article supporting the theory of Putin's role in the Russian apartment bombings, based in part on his interviews with Mikhail Trepashkin. The journal owner, Condé Nast, then took extreme measures to prevent an article by Anderson from appearing in the Russian media, both physically and in translation. According to the NPR, Anderson was asked not to syndicate the article to any Russian publications, but told GQ he would refuse the request.

== Personal life ==
His brother is Jon Lee Anderson, an author and journalist, and they have co-authored two books. Anderson is married to American film and television director Nanette Burstein. They currently live in Brooklyn, New York with their daughter.

== Awards and recognition ==
- 2013 National Book Critics Circle Award (Biography) shortlist for Lawrence in Arabia: War, Deceit, Imperial Folly and the Making of the Modern Middle East
- 2025 Kirkus Prize for Nonfiction for King of Kings: The Iranian Revolution: A Story of Hubris, Delusion and Catastrophic Miscalculation

== Bibliography ==
=== Non-fiction ===
- Inside the League: The Shocking Exposé of How Terrorists, Nazis, and Latin American Death Squads have Infiltrated the World Anti-Communist League. With Jon Lee Anderson. Dodd Mead, New York 1986, ISBN 0-396-08517-2.
- War Zones: Voices from the World's Killing Grounds. With Jon Lee Anderson. Dodd Mead, New York 1988, ISBN 0-396-08915-1.
- The 4 O'Clock Murders: The True Story of a Mormon Family's Vengeance. Doubleday, New York 1992, ISBN 0-385-41904-X.
- The Man who Tried to Save the World: The Dangerous Life and Mysterious Disappearance of Fred Cuny. Doubleday, New York 1999, ISBN 0-385-48665-0.
- Lawrence in Arabia: War, Deceit, Imperial Folly and the Making of the Modern Middle East. Doubleday, New York 2013, ISBN 978-0-385-53292-1.
- Fractured Lands: How the Arab World Came Apart. Signal (McClelland & Stewart, Penguin Random House Canada), 2017, ISBN 978-0-7710-0773-6.
- The Quiet Americans: Four CIA Spies at the Dawn of the Cold War – A Tragedy in Three Acts. Knopf Doubleday, New York 2020, ISBN 978-0-385-54046-9.
- King of Kings: The Iranian Revolution: A Story of Hubris, Delusion and Catastrophic Miscalculation. Doubleday, New York 2025, ISBN 978-0-385-54807-6.

=== Fiction ===
- Triage. Scribner, New York 1999, ISBN 0-684-85653-0.
- Moonlight Hotel. Doubleday, New York 2006, ISBN 0-385-51556-1.
