= Buffelsdraai Landfill Site Community Reforestation Project =

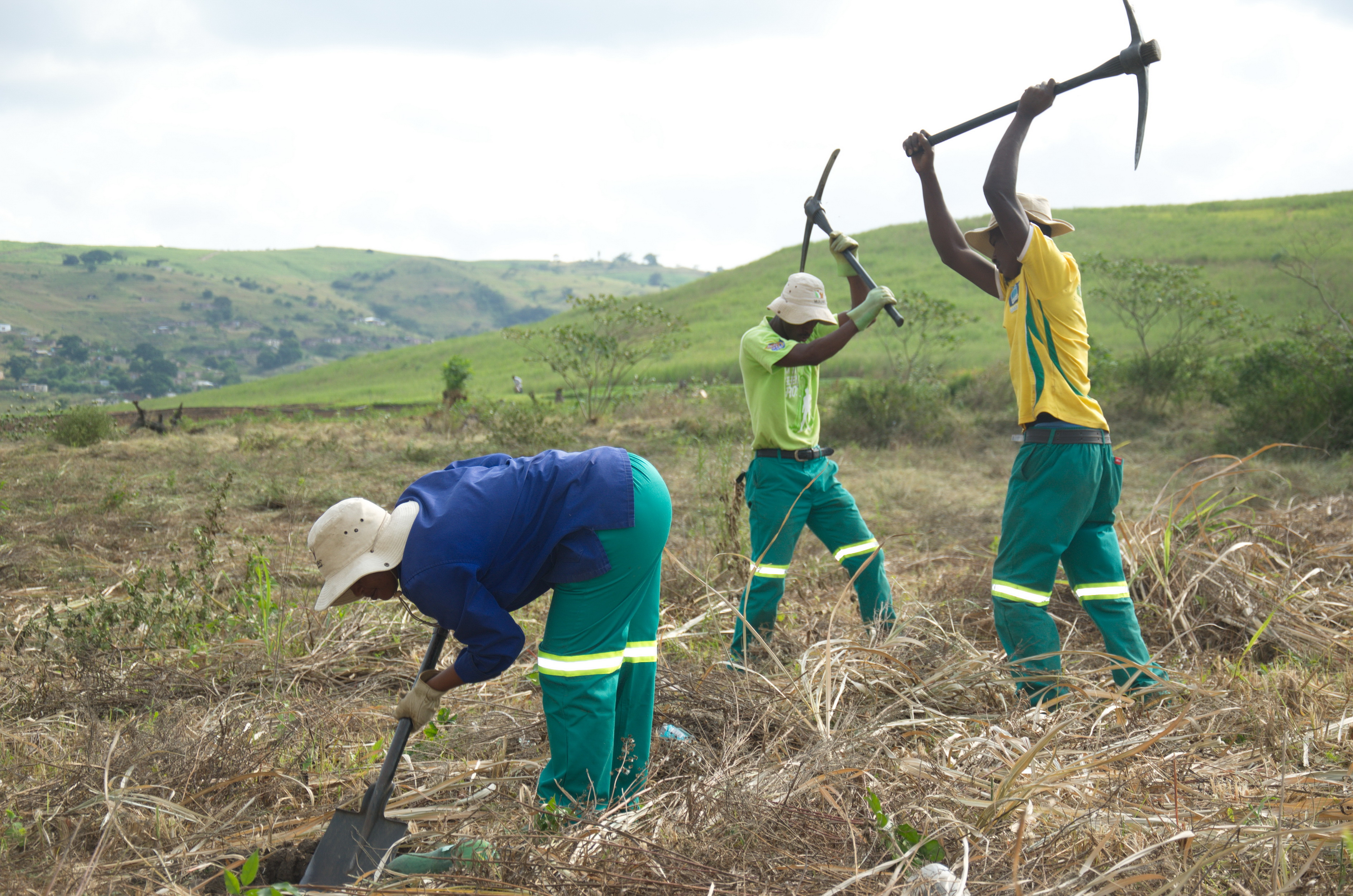
Tree planting, at the Buffelsdraai Community Reforestation Project

The Buffelsdraai Community Reforestation Project was initiated in 2008 to alleviate climate change impacts associated with hosting elements of the 2010 FIFA World Cup in Durban. The proposed carbon offset was to be achieved through the planting of more than 500 000 indigenous trees within the buffer zone of the Buffelsdraai Landfill Site. Restoring the forest ecosystem was identified as a way of "absorbing event-related greenhouse gas emissions while enhancing the capacity of people and biodiversity to adapt to the inevitable effects of climate change".

== History ==
The purchasing, development and commissioning (in early 2006) of the Buffelsdraai Landfill was undertaken to accommodate the increasing solid waste produced from the northern suburbs of Durban and surrounding areas. The site will receive municipal solid waste over a period of 50 to 70 years. Historically, the land was privately owned and used for sugarcane production for over 100 years. As a result, many areas were infested with alien invasive plants and weeds. All landfills sites in South Africa are required by law to have a buffer zone between the active landfill and adjacent communities. The Buffelsdraai buffer zone would be a minimum of 800 m wide and 787 ha in extent and would shield the neighbouring communities, namely Buffelsdraai and Osindisweni, from the impacts of the landfill.

In 2008, the eThekwini Municipality made a decision that farming would be phased out, in order to rehabilitate the land to indigenous forest. As a result, the Municipality's (then) Environmental Planning and Climate Protection Department, in partnership with the Wildlands Conservation Trust and eThekwini Municipality's Durban Solid Waste, initiated the Reforestation Project. This decision contributed towards the establishment of a “Conservancy” encompassing both the landfill site and buffer zone, in accordance with the required conditions of the environmental authorisation provided. The Reforestation Project would incorporate “Ecosystem-based Adaptation principles as a means to improve resilience to climate change". The holistic approach of the Municipality would address biodiversity conservation, climate change mitigation and adaptation, rural development and poverty alleviation. While the municipality's Durban Solid Waste Department is the landowner, the Biodiversity Management Department continues to run the Reforestation project, together with its appointed service providers who oversee on-site operations. Tree growing is achieved through the ‘Indigenous Trees for Life’ initiative developed by the Wildlands Conservation Trust.

== Description ==
The Buffelsdraai Landfill Site is located north-west of Durban city approximately 8 km west of the small town of Verulam, KwaZulu-Natal. It is the largest regional waste landfill site and is owned and managed by the eThekwini Municipality's Durban Solid Waste department. The footprint of the active landfill area (or solid waste disposal area) is 116.2 ha. Trees have been planted into 580 ha of the 787 ha buffer zone. The balance of the buffer zone comprises existing grasslands, woodlands, wetlands and riparian areas, which are being restored and managed. Additional trees were planted to create a border around the landfill footprint in order to screen off the landfill operations (of the odour, noise and visual effects) and act as a firebreak. A wide strip of thorny trees were planted around the buffer zone boundary, to act as a 'living fence'. This alternative fence is considered effective in minimising incursions by vehicles, people and stock animals into the buffer zone area.

The Biodiversity Management Department has constructed a Centre of Excellence building on the site, which is used by researchers, scholars, community members and tourists. It is considered a centre of learning for climate change adaptation and restoration ecology. The centre showcases sustainability, green technologies such as solar panels, water capture, storage and reuse, efficient lighting etc. All timber in the building was sourced from invasive alien trees that were previously growing on the site. An indigenous tree nursery is adjacent to the building.

== Geology and soils ==
A soil survey was undertaken prior to the rehabilitation of the buffer zone to determine the distribution of soil types. This would assist with identifying the likely historic distribution of primary vegetation types so that these may be replicated during rehabilitation of the site. The dominant geology within the site is Dwyka Tillite (of the Dwyka Group formations), a glacial conglomerate parent material that is base-rich, hard and resistant to weathering. The eastern boundary is composed of shale, sandstones and red sands of the Pietermaritzburg, Vryheid and Berea Formations. The central part of the study area is underlain by shales of the Ecca Group, Pietermaritzburg Formation. Eight soil forms were identified at Buffelsdraai. The historic landuse of sugarcane cultivation on moderate to steep slopes on site has resulted in the top 50 cm of the soil profile being completely mixed by land preparation activities as well as a net export of soil material by overland runoff and erosion of gullies.[5] The impacts of cultivation over the past several decades were likely to have influenced soil formation.

== Project benefits ==
Benefits from the Project include: the restoration of biodiversity, restoration of ecosystems for improved delivery of ecosystem services, and the creation of jobs and livelihood benefits for poor communities. Success at the site resulted in the same methodology being used at two other project sites - one at iNanda Mountain and one at Paradise Valley Nature Reserve. All offer the same adaptation and mitigation co-benefits.

=== Carbon offsets ===
As a result of the high-density tree planting, the Buffelsdraai forest habitat has the ability to store a large volume of carbon, thus playing an important role in reducing atmospheric carbon dioxide (a powerful greenhouse gas). The site is anticipated to sequester 42 214 tons of CO_{2} over a 20-year period.

=== Socio-economic ===
The communities involved in the Project were initially some of the most impoverished and vulnerable in Durban. By restoring the forest ecosystem in Buffelsdraai the livelihoods and resilience of people are supported. The ‘Indigenous Trees for Life’ model developed and implemented by the Wildlands Conservation Trust, was adopted as the approach for tree production. The approach encourages local, unemployed people, known as ‘Tree-preneurs’, to collect indigenous tree seeds which they propagate at their homesteads. The tree seedlings are traded to the Project in exchange for credit notes, which in turn can be traded for basic food items, clothes, building materials, used to pay for school fees and driving lessons. Tree-preneurs have also been able to build new homes and enrol in higher education programmes.

The restoration of forest habitat has provided the resident community with many other employment and skills development opportunities, including invasive alien plant species control; active tree planting; catchment protection; fire management and waste recycling. Ninety percent of people that benefit from this project were previously earning wages below the poverty line, and considered amongst the most vulnerable in South Africa. From project inception in 2008, to 2015, some 455 jobs (50 full-time, 16 part-time and 389 temporary) were created, and over 600 active tree-preneurs involved. In 2023, a total of 309 jobs (32 full-time, 5 part-time temporary) were created, and over 221 active tree-preneurs were growing trees.

=== Increased biodiversity ===
There has been a marked increase in fauna and flora. As of June 2023, 1 033 216 trees had been planted into 580 ha of old sugar cane lands, and tree species increased from 0 to 144. A total of 90 bird species were recorded on the site in 2009. This increased to 145 in 2015 and the total recorded in 2023 now stands at 197 species. Nine millipede and 22 mollusc species were recorded on site.

=== Improved ecosystem goods and services ===
The “ecological infrastructure” being built, in the form of a restored indigenous forest, will enhance the supply of ecosystem goods and services to rural people who are highly dependent on natural resources for their basic survival and safety. Forests provide ecosystem goods to people, in the form of food, wood, fibre and medicine. The ecosystem services derived from the restored forests include enhanced biodiversity refuges, water quality, river flow regulation, flood mitigation, sediment control, improved visual impact and a reduction in fire-risk. “Such services enhance the long-term climate change adaptation benefits derived by local communities, as well as short-term resilience to unpredictable and dangerous weather patterns".

=== Building partnerships ===
The eThekwini Municipality has established key partnerships with households in local communities. The Municipality has also engaged with other partners and implementing agents, including the Durban Research Action Partnership, established with the University of KwaZulu-Natal, an Environmental Education partnership with the Wildlife and Environmental Society of South Africa; a partnership with the Municipality's Coastal, Stormwater and Catchment Management Department, for construction of a weir for water monitoring purposes; and a partnership with the Municipality's Energy Office, which has provided photovoltaic and solar geyser technologies.

== Project gains ==
In 2011, the Project was selected as one of the top 10 global projects as part of the United Nations Framework Convention on Climate Change 'Momentum for Change' Initiative and a Gold Standard Validation Certificate was issued by the Climate, Community & Biodiversity Alliance for delivering social, biodiversity and carbon sequestration benefits at an international standard. The United Nations announced in 2021 that the Project was selected as one of the UN Decade on Ecosystem Restoration ‘Founding 50’ projects.

== Lessons learnt ==
One survey found that the tree-preneurs were not sufficiently aware of why the reforestation programme was initiated, nor of its potential benefits. As such, better education for the local community members was suggested, as a means to improve their understanding of conservation and climate change, as well as the ecosystem services that they may benefit from. The project ultimately also needs to assist tree-preneurs with becoming less dependent on the project for the exchange of trees for goods and to actually start selling trees on the open market. The programme could assist tree-preneurs with finding ways to develop and expand the commercial potential of supplying trees to nurseries (including fruit trees and vegetables, seedlings and actual produce), establishing additional nurseries, and supplying to local and regional markets.
