= Triage (novel) =

1998 novel by Scott Anderson

- Author: Scott Anderson
- Cover artist: Steve Rawlings
- Language: English
- Genre: Novel
- Publisher: Scribner
- Publication date: 1998
- Publication place: United States
- Media type: Print (hardback & paperback)
- Pages: 235 pp
- ISBN: 0-330-36854-0 (paperback edition)
- OCLC: 43031113

Triage is a 1998 novel by Scott Anderson. Triage focuses on the psychological effects of war on the photo journalist protagonist, Mark.

== Plot summary ==
Mark Walsh, a young war photographer, returns to New York in 1989 after being injured in Kurdistan whilst on assignment. He had spent a few frightening days in the recovery ward of a dilapidated, overcrowded hospital inside a cave, but can this explain his sleeplessness, distraction, his wounds' inability to heal? Elena, Mark's Spanish girlfriend, grows more and more alarmed by his strange behavior, while she also tries to calm her pregnant friend Diane, whose photographer husband has gone missing in the same war zone. As Mark continues to deteriorate, Elena's grandfather sweeps onto the scene. Joaquin is the last person from whom Elena wants to accept help; once very close to him, she ended all contact after learning of his role in "purifying" conscience-stricken officers after the Spanish Civil War. In treating Mark, Joaquin sees a way back into his granddaughter's life, and, despite Elena's disapproval, the two men begin to forge an extraordinary relationship. Eventually, all three travel to Joaquin's manor home in Granada, Spain so that Mark can find a safe haven in which to heal. It is in this romantic and haunted Spanish valley where both men's secrets surface with life-altering force and where Mark and Elena attempt to know and love each other again, with the discovery of her grandfather's secrets of the incurables and of Mark's knowing that Colin is dead and that he could not save him.

== Characters in Triage ==
- Mark Walsh – The protagonist; a war photojournalist dealing with the psychological trauma arising from the time in Northern Iraq
- Elena Morales – Mark's Spanish girlfriend
- Joaquin Morales – Elena's estranged grandfather, a former psychiatrist who treated soldiers dealing with the aftermath of the Spanish Civil War during Francisco Franco's regime.
- Colin – Mark’s war photography partner and friend
- Diane – Colin's pregnant wife and Elena's best friend

== Film adaptation ==
From April to June 2008, shooting ran on a film adaption of the same name. The film is directed and written by Danis Tanović and features Colin Farrell as Mark, Paz Vega as Elena, Sir Christopher Lee as Joaquin, Kelly Reilly as Diane, Branko Đurić as Dr Talzani and Jamie Sives as David (Colin in the novel). It was released in late 2009.

== Sources, references, external links, quotations ==
- Triage By Valerie Sutherland Published in Education Age 5 May 2001
