= Ecological restoration =

Scientific study of renewing and restoring ecosystems

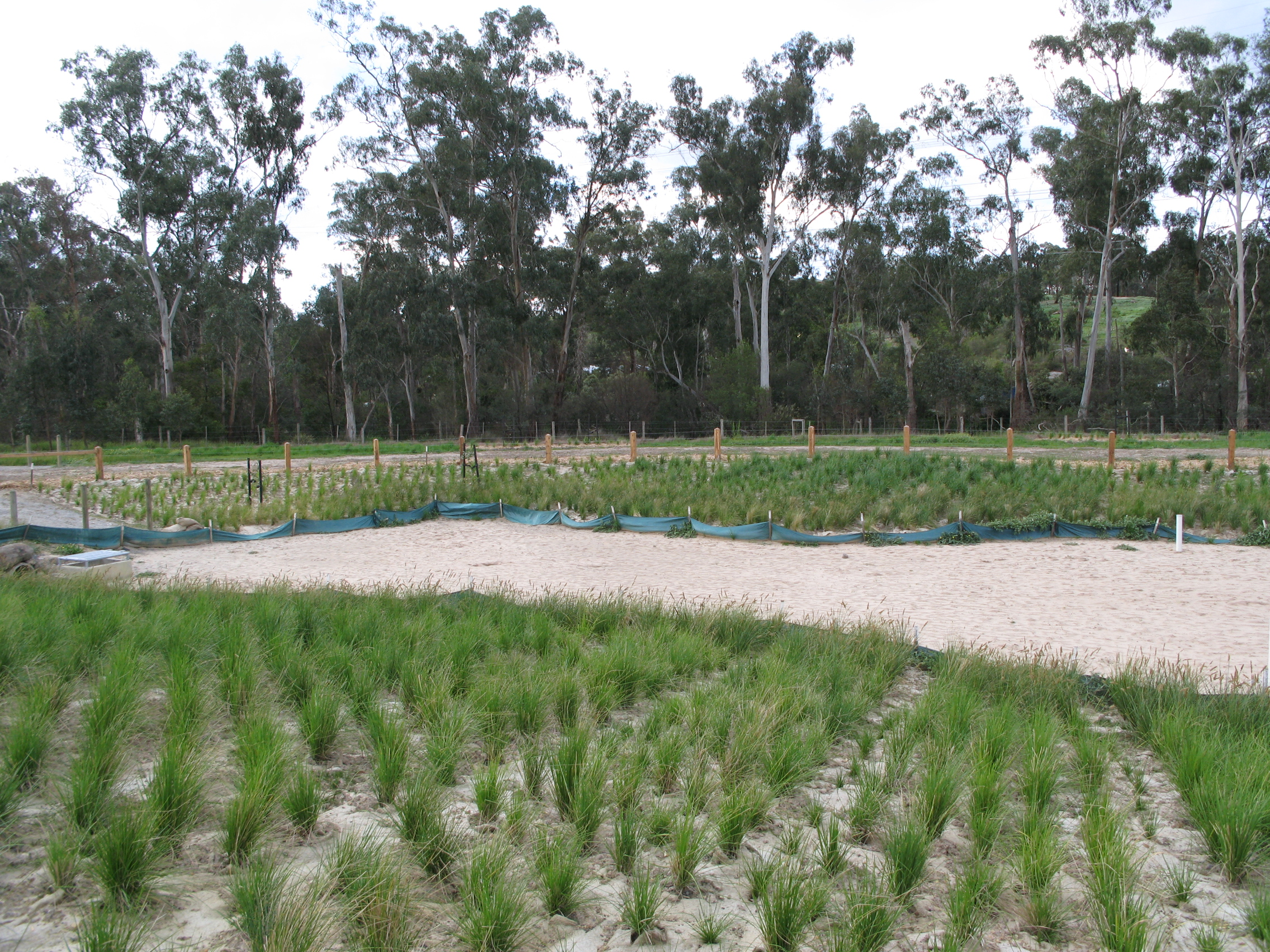
Recently constructed wetland regeneration in Australia, on a site previously used for agriculture

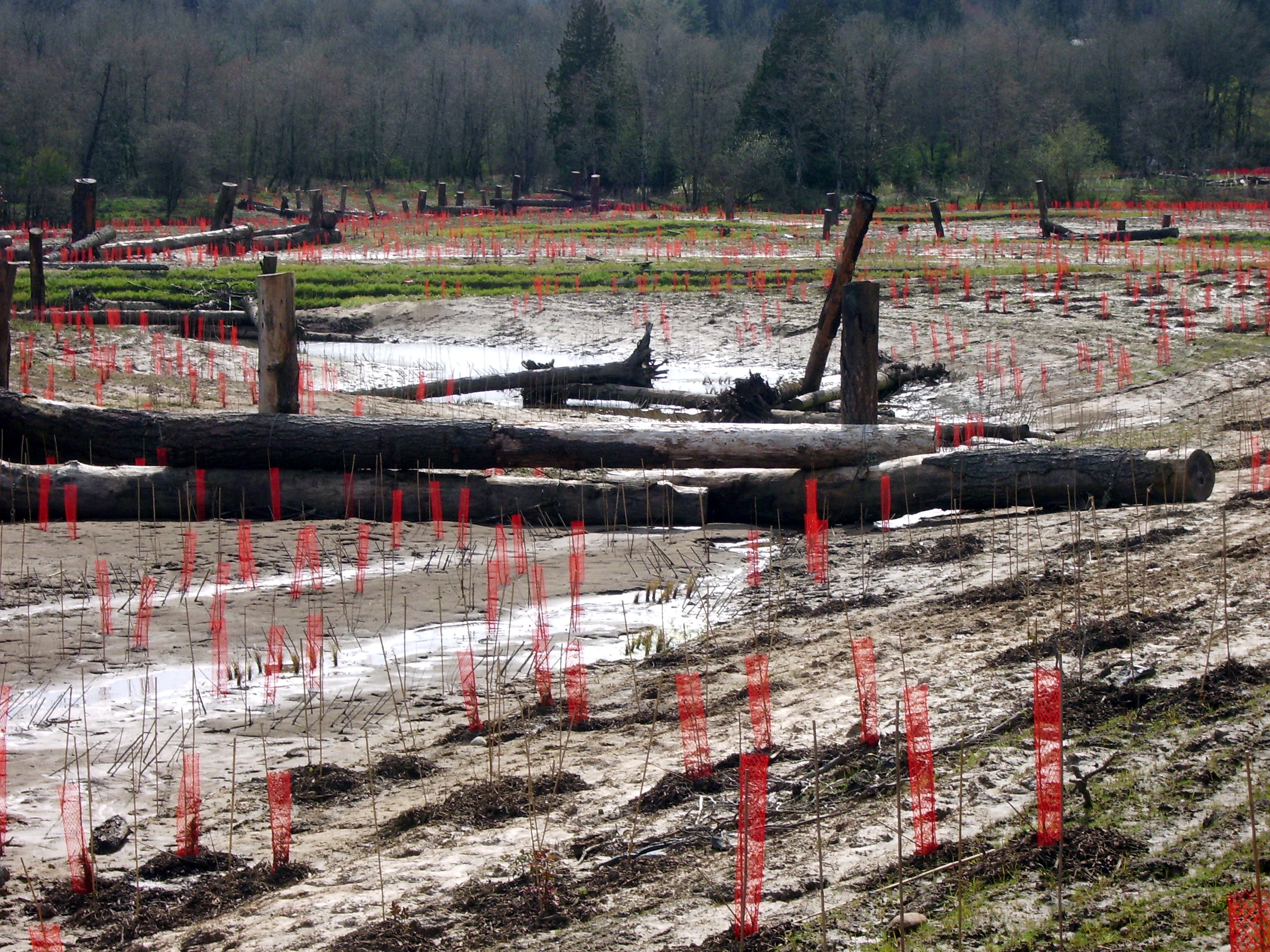
Rehabilitation of a portion of Johnson Creek, to restore bioswale and flood control functions of the land which had long been converted to pasture for cow grazing. The horizontal logs can float, but are anchored by the posts. Newly planted trees will eventually stabilize the soil. The fallen trees with roots jutting into the stream are intended to enhance wildlife habitat.

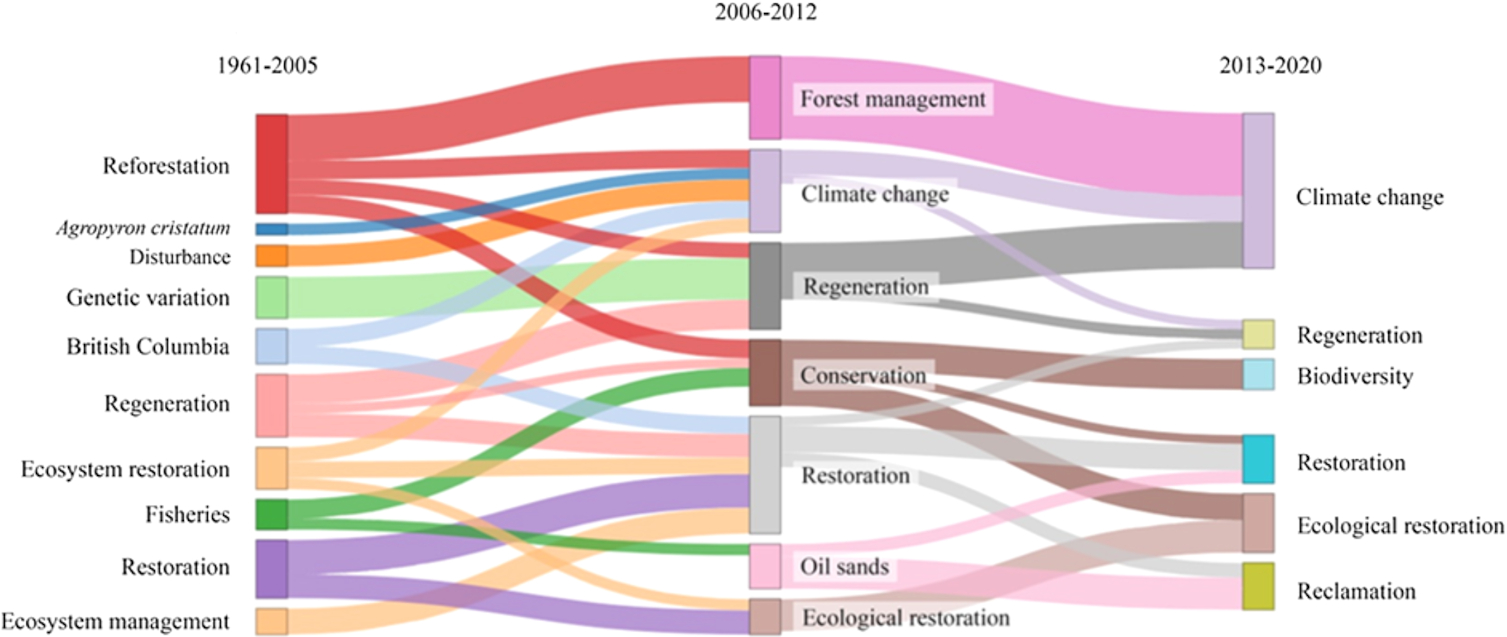
Sankey diagram for the evolution of keywords used in publications about ecological restoration in Canada over time

Ecological restoration, or ecosystem restoration, is the process of assisting the recovery of an ecosystem that has been degraded, damaged, destroyed or transformed. It is distinct from conservation in that it attempts to retroactively repair already damaged ecosystems rather than take preventative measures. Ecological restoration can help to reverse biodiversity loss, combat climate change, support the provision of ecosystem services and support local economies. The United Nations has named 2021–2030 the Decade on Ecosystem Restoration.

Habitat restoration involves the deliberate rehabilitation of a specific area to reestablish a functional ecosystem. This may differ from historical baselines (the ecosystem's original condition at a particular point in time). To achieve successful habitat restoration, it is essential to understand the life cycles and interactions of species, as well as the essential elements such as food, water, nutrients, space, and shelter needed to support species populations.

Scientists estimate that the current species extinction rate, or the rate of the Holocene extinction, is 1,000 to 10,000 times higher than the normal, background rate. Habitat loss is a leading cause of species extinctions and ecosystem service decline. Two methods have been identified to slow the rate of species extinction and ecosystem service decline: conservation of quality habitat and restoration of degraded habitat. The number and size of ecological restoration projects have increased exponentially in recent years, with hundreds of thousands of projects across the globe.

Restoration goals reflect political choices, and differ by place and culture. On a global level, the concept of nature-positive has emerged as a societal goal to achieve full nature recovery by 2050, including through restoration of degraded ecosystems to reverse biodiversity loss.

Ecological restoration has become an important global strategy for conserving biodiversity, and maintaining ecosystem services. Restoration initiatives often aim to return ecosystems to their original conditions, or improve an ecosystem's ecological integrity and function.

== Definition ==
The Society for Ecological Restoration defines restoration as "the process of assisting the recovery of an ecosystem that has been degraded, damaged, or destroyed." Restoration ecology is the academic study of the science of restoration, whereas ecological restoration is the implementation by practitioners. Ecological restoration includes a wide diversity of methods including erosion control, reforestation, removal of non-native species and weeds, revegetation of disturbed areas, daylighting streams, the reintroduction of native species, habitat and range improvement for targeted species and establishing wildlife corridors. Many scholars and practitioners argue that ecological restoration must include local communities and stakeholders: they call this process the "social-ecological restoration".

The goal of ecosystem restoration depends on the specific context of each location. Traditionally, the aim has been to return ecosystems to a past state (historic baseline), based on the idea that past conditions represent a 'pristine' or ideal functioning state. However, this approach is now questioned because human-driven environmental changes, including climate change, continuously alter ecosystems, resulting in a shifting baseline. Today, it's widely recognized that there may be several possible targets for restoration, based on a range of factors. Targets are set based on factors such as the level of ecosystem degradation, how much ecosystem functionality can realistically be restored, local community views, and the costs of restoration efforts.

Restoration efforts aim to support self sustaining ecological processes, and further support interactions within ecosystems.

== Rationale ==
There are many reasons to restore ecosystems. Some include:

- Restoring natural capital such as drinkable water or wildlife populations
- Restoring environmental degradation
- Helping human communities and the ecosystems upon which they depend adapt to the impacts of climate change (through ecosystem-based adaptation)
- Mitigating climate change (e.g. through carbon sequestration)
- Helping threatened or endangered species
- Aesthetic reasons
- Moral reasons: human intervention has unnaturally destroyed many habitats, and there exists an innate obligation to restore these destroyed habitats
- Regulated use/harvest, particularly for subsistence
- Cultural importance to indigenous people
- The environmental health of nearby populations

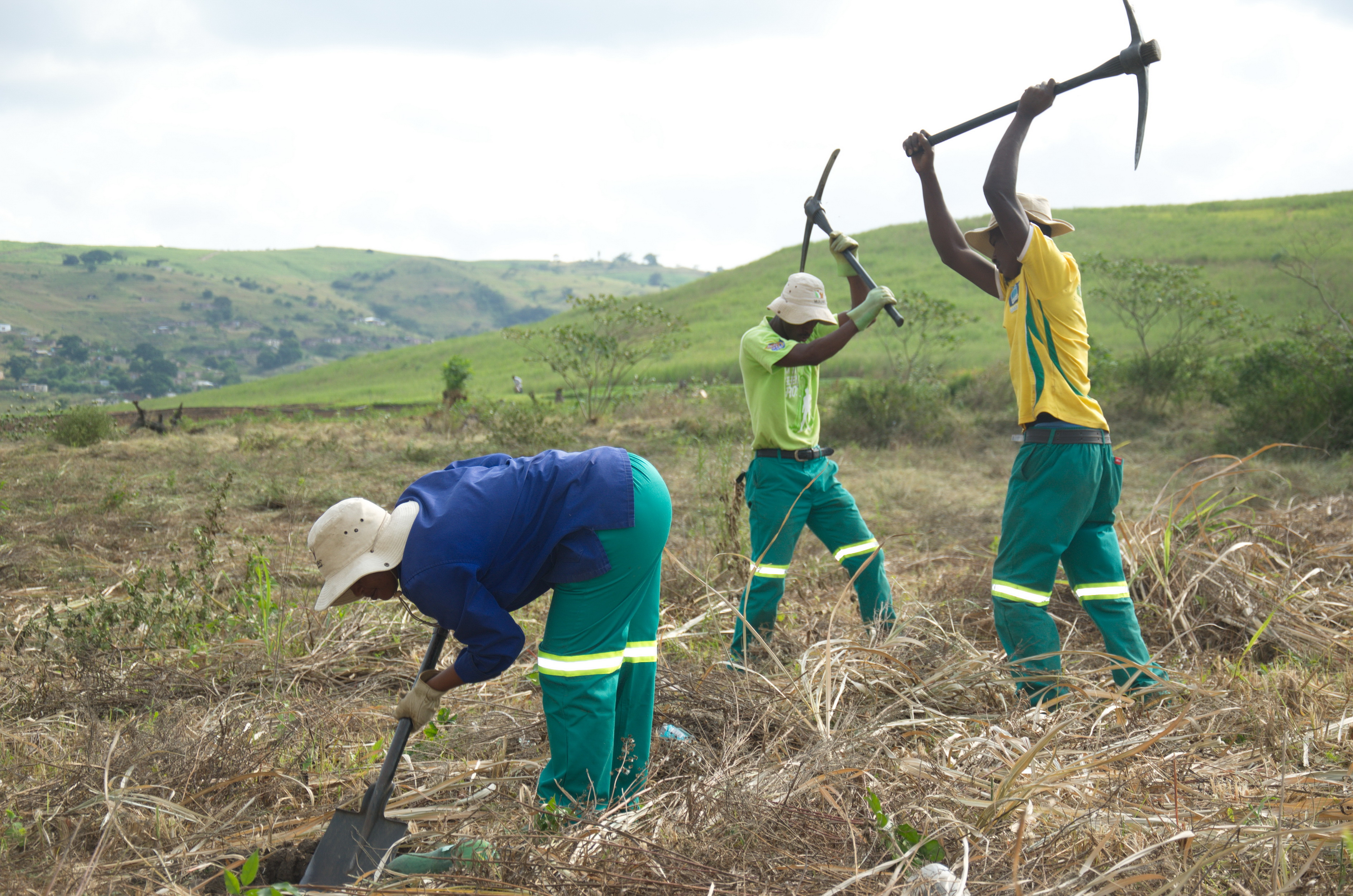
Forest restoration in action at the Buffelsdraai Landfill Site Community Reforestation Project in South Africa

There are considerable differences of opinion on how to set restoration goals and define their success. As Laura J. Martin writes, "Restoration targets are moral and political matters as well as logistical and scientific ones." Some restorationists urge active restoration (e.g. killing invasive animals) and others believe that protected areas should have the bare minimum of human interference, such as rewilding.

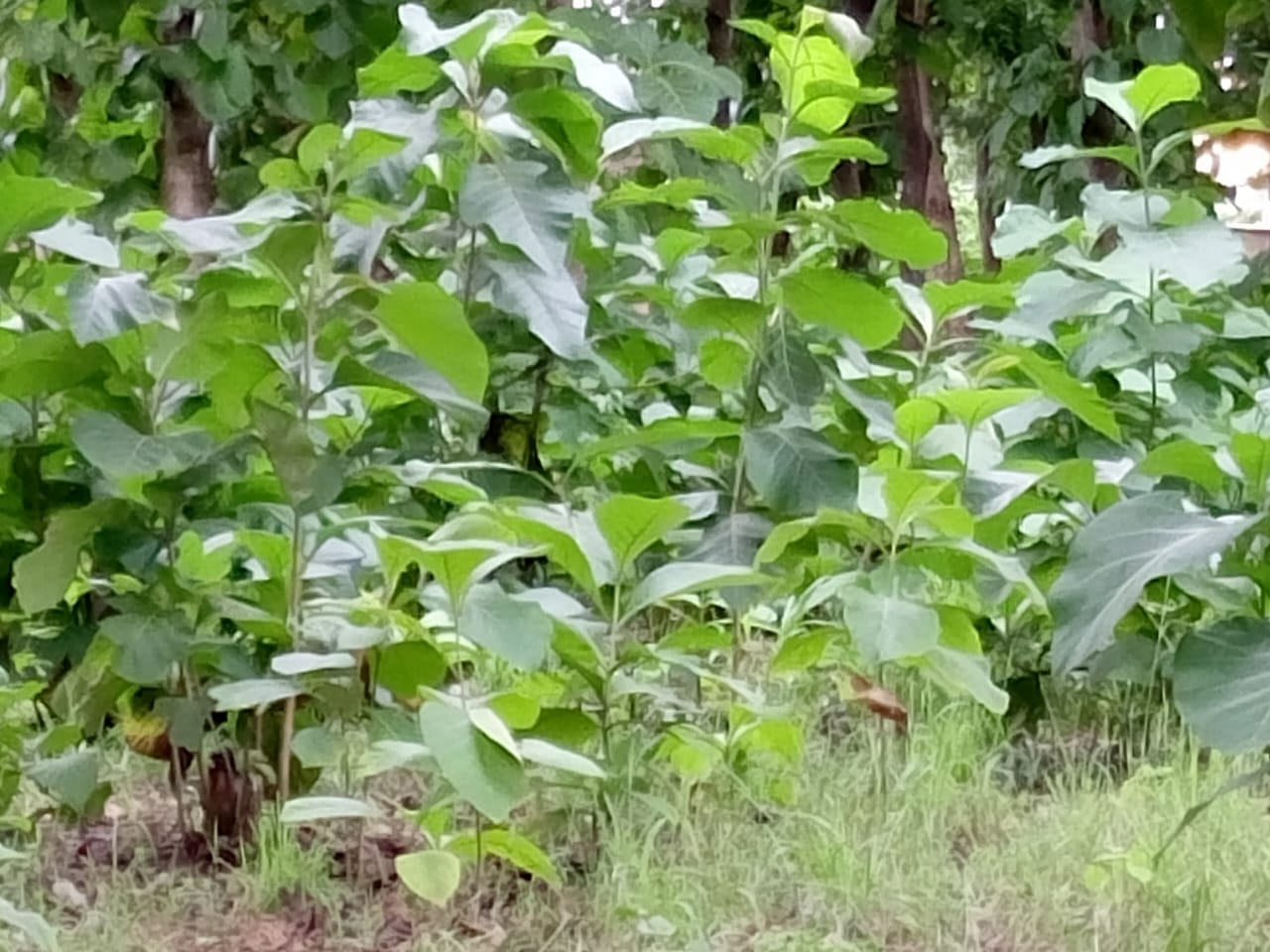
Young trees planted to restore a damaged ecosystem

Skeptics doubt that the benefits justify the economic investment or point to failed restoration projects and question the feasibility of restoration altogether. It can be difficult to set restoration goals because, as Anthony Bradshaw writes, "ecosystems are not static, but in a state of dynamic equilibrium." Some scientists argue that, though an ecosystem may not be returned to its original state, the functions of a "novel ecosystem" are still valuable.

Ecosystem restoration can mitigate climate change through activities such as afforestation. However, afforestation can have negative impacts on biodiversity especially when considering tree-planting initiatives in tropical savannas. The impacts of afforestation on water supply and quality are also debated and vary by region, climate and age of afforestation projects. Forestry-based carbon offsetting is controversial and sometimes critiqued as carbon colonialism. Another driver of restoration projects in the United States is the legal framework of the Clean Water Act, which often requires mitigation for damage inflicted on aquatic systems by development or other activities.

== Theoretical foundations ==
Ecological restoration draws on a wide range of ecological concepts.

=== Disturbance ===
Disturbance is a change in environmental conditions that disrupt the functioning of an ecosystem. Disturbance can occur at a variety of spatial and temporal scales, and is a natural component of many communities. For example, many forest and grassland restorations implement fire as a natural disturbance regime. However the severity and scope of anthropogenic impact has grown in the last few centuries. Differentiating between human-caused and naturally occurring disturbances is important if we are to understand how to restore natural processes and minimize anthropogenic impacts on the ecosystems.

=== Succession ===
Ecological succession is the process by which a community changes over time, especially following a disturbance. In many instances, an ecosystem will change from a simple level of organization with a few dominant pioneer species to an increasingly complex community with many interdependent species. Restoration often consists of initiating, assisting, or accelerating ecological successional processes, depending on the severity of the disturbance. Following mild to moderate natural and anthropogenic disturbances, restoration in these systems involves hastening natural successional trajectories through careful management. However, in a system that has experienced a more severe disturbance (such as in urban ecosystems), restoration may require intensive efforts to recreate environmental conditions that favor natural successional processes.

=== Fragmentation ===
Habitat fragmentation describes spatial discontinuities in a biological system, where ecosystems are broken up into smaller parts through land-use changes (e.g. agriculture) and natural disturbance. This both reduces the size of the population and increases the degree of isolation. These smaller and isolated populations tend to be more vulnerable to extinction. Fragmenting ecosystems decreases the quality of the habitat. The edge of a fragment has a different range of environmental conditions and therefore supports different species than the interior. Restorative projects can increase the effective size of a population by adding suitable habitat and decrease isolation by creating habitat corridors that link isolated fragments. Reversing the effects of fragmentation is an important component of restoration ecology. The composition of the surrounding landscape can also influence the effectiveness of restoration projects. For example, a restoration site that is closer to remaining vegetation will be more likely to be naturally regenerated through seed dispersal than a site that is further away.

=== Ecosystem function ===
Ecosystem function describes the most basic and essential foundational processes of any natural systems, including nutrient cycles and energy fluxes. An understanding of the complexity of these ecosystem functions is necessary to address any ecological processes that may be degraded. Ecosystem functions are emergent properties of the system as a whole, thus monitoring and management are crucial for the long-term stability of ecosystems. A completely self-perpetuating and fully functional ecosystem is the ultimate goal of restorative efforts. We must understand what ecosystem properties influence others to restore desired functions and reach this goal.

=== Community assembly ===
Community assembly "is a framework that can unify virtually all of (community) ecology under a single conceptual umbrella". Community assembly theory attempts to explain the existence of environmentally similar sites with differing assemblages of species. It assumes that species have similar niche requirements, so that community formation is a product of random fluctuations from a common species pool. Essentially, if all species are fairly ecologically equivalent, then random variation in colonization, and migration and extinction rates between species, drive differences in species composition between sites with comparable environmental conditions.

=== Population genetics ===
Genetic diversity has shown to be as important as species diversity for restoring ecosystem processes. Hence ecological restorations are increasingly factoring genetic processes into management practices. Population genetic processes that are important to consider in restored populations include founder effects, inbreeding depression, outbreeding depression, genetic drift, maladaption and gene flow. Such processes can predict whether or not a species successfully establishes at a restoration site.

== Applications ==
=== Leaf litter accumulation ===
Leaf litter accumulation plays an important role in the restoration process. Higher quantities of leaf litter hold higher humidity levels, a key factor for the establishment of plants. The process of accumulation depends on factors like wind and species composition of the forest. The leaf litter found in primary forests is more abundant, deeper, and holds more humidity than in secondary forests. These technical considerations are important to take into account when planning a restoration project.

=== Soil heterogeneity effects on community heterogeneity ===
Spatial heterogeneity of resources can influence plant community composition, diversity, and assembly trajectory. Baer et al. (2005) manipulated soil resource heterogeneity in a tallgrass prairie restoration project. They found increasing resource heterogeneity, which on its own was insufficient to ensure species diversity in situations where one species may dominate across the range of resource levels. Their findings were consistent with the theory regarding the role of ecological filters on community assembly. The establishment of a single species, best adapted to the physical and biological conditions can play an inordinately important role in determining the community structure.

=== Invasion and restoration ===
Restoration is used as a tool for reducing the spread of invasive plant species many ways. The first method views restoration primarily as a means to reduce the presence of invasive species and limit their spread. As this approach emphasizes the control of invaders, the restoration techniques can differ from typical restoration projects. The goal of such projects is not necessarily to restore an entire ecosystem or habitat. These projects frequently use lower diversity mixes of aggressive native species seeded at high density. They are not always actively managed following seeding. The target areas for this type of restoration are those which are heavily dominated by invasive species. The goals are to first remove the species and then in so doing, reduce the number of invasive seeds being spread to surrounding areas. An example of this is through the use of biological control agents (such as herbivorous insects) which suppress invasive weed species while restoration practitioners concurrently seed in native plant species that take advantage of the freed resources. These approaches have been shown to be effective in reducing weeds, although it is not always a sustainable solution long term without additional weed control, such as mowing, or re-seeding.

Restoration projects are also used as a way to better understand what makes an ecological community resistant to invasion. As restoration projects have a broad range of implementation strategies and methods used to control invasive species, they can be used by ecologists to test theories about invasion. Restoration projects have been used to understand how the diversity of the species introduced in the restoration affects invasion. We know that generally higher diversity prairies have lower levels of invasion. The incorporation of functional ecology has shown that more functionally diverse restorations have lower levels of invasion. Furthermore, studies have shown that using native species functionally similar to invasive species are better able to compete with invasive species. Restoration ecologists have also used a variety of strategies employed at different restoration sites to better understand the most successful management techniques to control invasion. To develop restoration ecology into a full science and to improve its practice requires generalizations about the processes governing the development of restored communities. While new experiments can be designed, one way forward is to use data from existing restoration studies to relate plant species performance to their ecological trait.

=== Successional trajectories ===
Progress along a desired successional pathway may be difficult if multiple stable states exist. Looking over 40 years of wetland restoration data, Klötzli and Gootjans (2001) argue that unexpected and undesired vegetation assemblies "may indicate that environmental conditions are not suitable for target communities". Succession may move in unpredicted directions, but constricting environmental conditions within a narrow range may rein in the possible successional trajectories and increase the likelihood of the desired outcome.

=== Sourcing land for restoration ===
A study quantified climate change mitigation potentials of 'high-income' nations shifting diets – away from meat-consumption – and restoration of the spared land. They find that the hypothetical dietary change "could reduce annual agricultural production emissions of high-income nations' diets by 61% while sequestering as much as 98.3 (55.6–143.7) GtCO_{2} equivalent, equal to approximately 14 years of current global agricultural emissions until natural vegetation matures", outcomes they call "double climate dividend".

=== Sourcing material for restoration ===
For most restoration projects it is generally recommended to source material from local populations, to increase the chance of restoration success and minimize the effects of maladaptation. However the definition of local can vary based on species, habitat and region. US Forest Service recently developed provisional seed zones based on a combination of minimum winter temperature zones, aridity, and the Level III ecoregions. Rather than putting strict distance recommendations, other guidelines recommend sourcing seeds to match similar environmental conditions that the species is exposed to, either now, or under projected climate change. For example, sourcing for Castilleja levisecta found that farther source populations that matched similar environmental variables were better suited for the restoration project than closer source populations. Similarly, a suite of new methods are surveying gene-environment interactions in order to identify the optimum source populations based on genetic adaptation to environmental conditions.

== Challenges ==
Some view ecosystem restoration as impractical, partially because restorations often fall short of their goals. Hilderbrand et al. point out that many times uncertainty (about ecosystem functions, species relationships, and such) is not addressed, and that the time-scales set out for 'complete' restoration are unreasonably short, while other critical markers for full-scale restoration are either ignored or abridged due to feasibility concerns. In other instances an ecosystem may be so degraded that abandonment (allowing a severely degraded ecosystem to recover on its own) may be the wisest option. Local communities sometimes object to restorations that include the introduction of large predators or plants that require disturbance regimes such as regular fires, citing threat to human habitation in the area. High economic costs can also be perceived as a negative impact of the restoration process.

However, restoration outcomes are often variable and influenced by factors such as past land use, climate change, and species interactions. Toward an era of restoration in ecology.

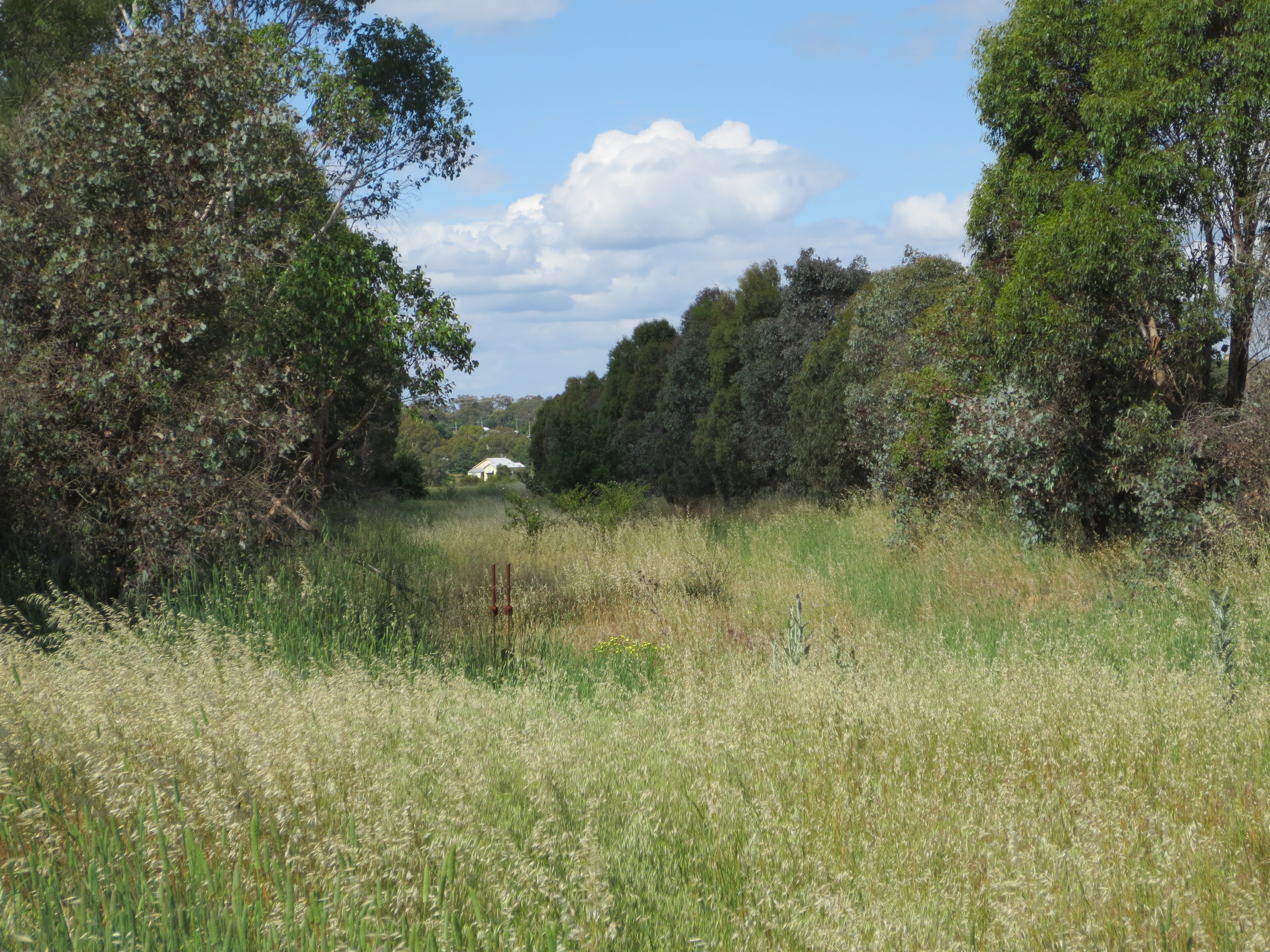
Ecosystem restoration for the superb parrot on an abandoned railway line in Australia

Public opinion is very important in the feasibility of a restoration; if the public believes that the costs of restoration outweigh the benefits they will not support it.

Many failures have occurred in past restoration projects, many times because clear goals were not set out as the aim of the restoration, or an incomplete understanding of the underlying ecological framework lead to insufficient measures. This may be because, as Peter Alpert says, "people may not [always] know how to manage natural systems effectively". Furthermore, many assumptions are made about myths of restoration such as carbon copy, where a restoration plan, which worked in one area, is applied to another with the same results expected, but not realized.

=== Science–practice gap ===
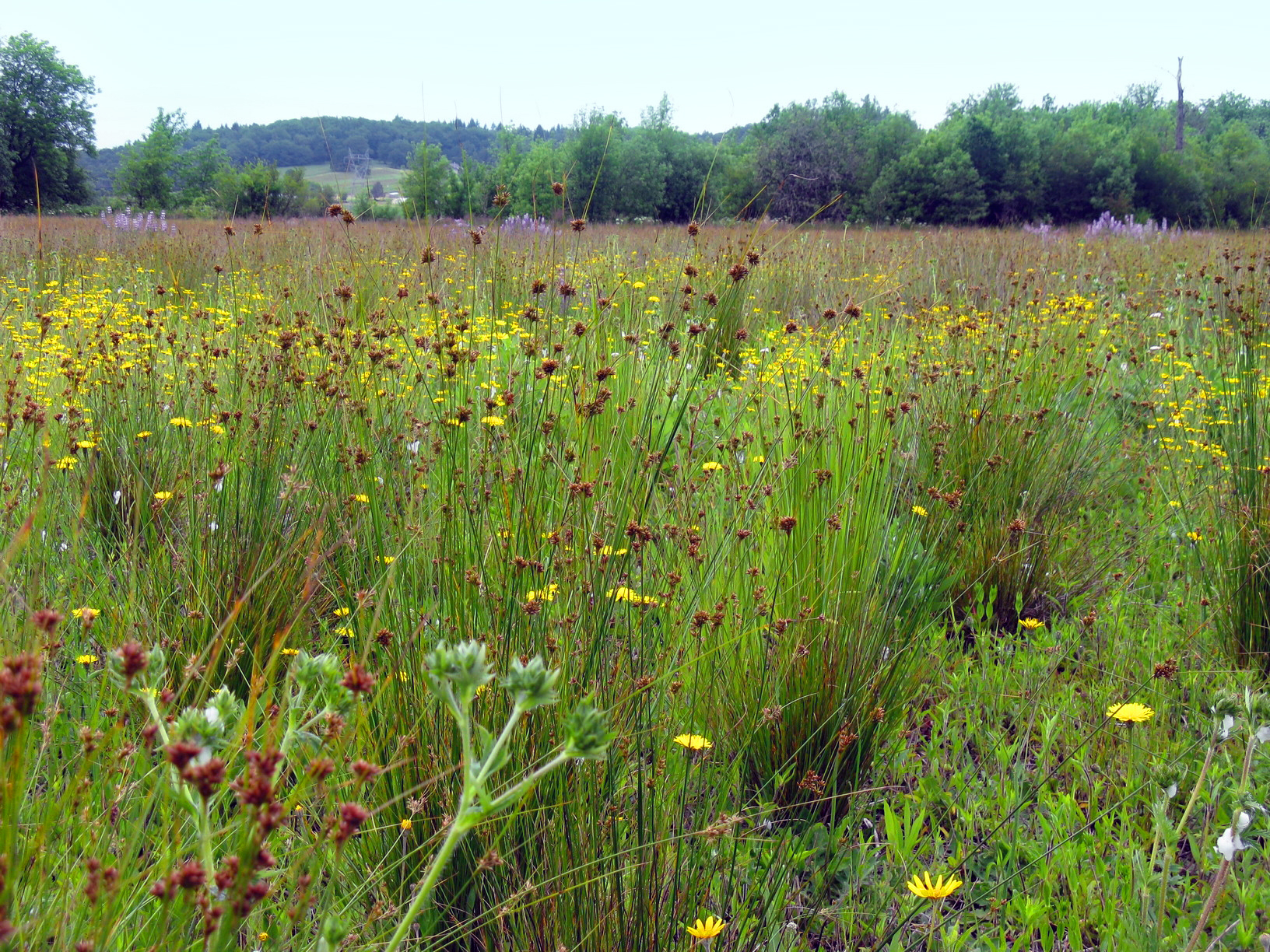
Restored prairie at the West Eugene Wetlands in Eugene, Oregon

One of the struggles for both fields is a divide between restoration ecology and ecological restoration in practice. Many restoration practitioners as well as scientists feel that science is not being adequately incorporated into ecological restoration projects. In a 2009 survey of practitioners and scientists, the "science-practice gap" was listed as the second most commonly cited reason limiting the growth of both science and practice of restoration.

There are a variety of theories about the cause of this gap. However, it has been well established that one of the main issues is that the questions studied by restoration ecologists are frequently not found useful or easily applicable by land managers. For instance, many publications in restoration ecology characterize the scope of a problem in-depth, without providing concrete solutions. Additionally many restoration ecology studies are carried out under controlled conditions and frequently at scales much smaller than actual restorations. Whether or not these patterns hold true in an applied context is often unknown. There is evidence that these small-scale experiments inflate type II error rates and differ from ecological patterns in actual restorations. One approach to addressing this gap has been the development of International Principles & Standards for the Practice of Ecological Restoration by the Society for Ecological restoration (see below) – however, this approach is contended, with scientists active in the field suggesting that this is restrictive, and instead principles and guidelines offer flexibility.

There is further complication in that restoration ecologists who want to collect large-scale data on restoration projects can face enormous hurdles in obtaining the data. Managers vary in how much data they collect, and how many records they keep. Some agencies keep only a handful of physical copies of data that make it difficult for the researcher to access. Many restoration projects are limited by time and money, so data collection and record-keeping are not always feasible. However, this limits the ability of scientists to analyze restoration projects and give recommendations based on empirical data.

=== Food security and nature degradation ===
Agriculture is a driver of environmental degradation. However it is vital that ecosystem restoration efforts do not clash with increasing needs for food production. Restoration frameworks aim to assist policy decisions by minimizing trade-offs between ecological restoration and production and evaluating the best use of land to balance carbon storage and food growing. For example, agroforestry is increasing considered as a viable ecosystem restoration strategy, especially in countries with large agriculture footprints.

=== Restoration as a substitute for steep emission reductions ===
Climate benefits from nature restoration are "dwarfed by the scale of ongoing fossil fuel emissions". It risks "over-relying on land for mitigation at the expense of phasing out fossil fuels". Despite these issues, nature restoration is receiving increasing attention, with a study concluding that "Land restoration is an important option for tackling climate change but cannot compensate for delays in reducing fossil fuel emissions" as it is "unlikely to be done quickly enough to notably reduce the global peak temperatures expected in the next few decades".

Researchers have found that, in terms of environmental services, it is better to avoid deforestation than to allow for deforestation to subsequently reforest, as the former leads to irreversible effects in terms of biodiversity loss and soil degradation. Furthermore, the probability that legacy carbon will be released from soil is higher in younger boreal forest. Global greenhouse gas emissions caused by damage to tropical rainforests may have been substantially underestimated until around 2019. Additionally, the effects of af- or reforestation will be farther in the future than keeping existing forests intact. It takes much longer − several decades − for the benefits for global warming to manifest to the same carbon sequestration benefits from mature trees in tropical forests and hence from limiting deforestation. Therefore, scientists consider "the protection and recovery of carbon-rich and long-lived ecosystems, especially natural forests" to be "the major climate solution".

== Contrasting restoration ecology and conservation biology ==
Both restoration ecologists and conservation biologists agree that protecting and restoring habitat is important for protecting biodiversity. However, conservation biology is primarily rooted in population biology. Because of that, it is generally organized at the population genetic level and assesses specific species populations (i.e. endangered species). Restoration ecology is organized at the community level, which focuses on broader groups within ecosystems.

In addition, conservation biology often concentrates on vertebrate and invertebrate animals because of their salience and popularity, whereas restoration ecology concentrates on plants. Restoration ecology focuses on plants because restoration projects typically begin by establishing plant communities. Ecological restoration, despite being focused on plants, may also have "umbrella species" for individual ecosystems and restoration projects. For example, the Monarch butterfly is an umbrella species for conserving and restoring milkweed plant habitat, because Monarch butterflies require milkweed plants to reproduce. Finally, restoration ecology has a stronger focus on soils, soil structure, fungi, and microorganisms because soils provide the foundation of functional terrestrial ecosystems.

== International Principles & Standards for the Practice of Ecological Restoration ==
The Society for Ecological Restoration (SER) released the second edition of the International Standards for the Practice of Ecological Restoration on September 27, 2019, in Cape Town, South Africa, at SER's 8th World Conference on Ecological Restoration. The publication provides updated and expanded guidance on the practice of ecological restoration, clarifies the breadth of ecological restoration and allied environmental repair activities, and includes ideas and input from a diverse international group of restoration scientists and practitioners.

The second edition builds on the first edition of the Standards, which was released December 12, 2016, at the Convention on Biological Diversity's 13th Conference of the Parties in Cancun, Mexico. The development of these Standards has been broadly consultative. The first edition was circulated to dozens of practitioners and experts for feedback and review. After release of the first edition, SER held workshops and listening sessions, sought feedback from key international partners and stakeholders, opened a survey to members, affiliates and supporters, and considered and responded to published critiques.

The International Principles and Standards for the Practice of Ecological Restoration:

- Present a robust framework to guide restoration projects toward achieving intended goals.
- Address restoration challenges including: effective design and implementation, accounting for complex ecosystem dynamics (especially in the context of climate change), and navigating trade-offs associated with land management priorities and decisions.
- Highlight the role of ecological restoration in connecting social, community, productivity, and sustainability goals.
- Recommend performance measures for restorative activities for industries, communities, and governments to consider.
- Enhance the list of practices and actions that guide practitioners in planning, implementation, and monitoring activities, including: appropriate approaches to site assessment and identification of reference ecosystems, different restoration approaches including natural regeneration, and the role of ecological restoration in global restoration initiatives.
- Include an expanded glossary of restoration terminology.
- Provide a technical appendix on sourcing of seeds and other propagules for restoration.

== Implementation by country/region ==
Indigenous peoples, land managers, stewards, and laypeople have been practicing ecological restoration or ecological management for thousands of years. Restoration ecology emerged as a separate field in ecology in the late twentieth century. The term was coined by John Aber and William Jordan III when they were at the University of Wisconsin–Madison.

=== European Union ===
In 2024, the European Union passed a nature restoration law aiming to restore 20% of degraded ecosystems by 2030 and 100% by 2050. The representative of Austria, Leonore Gewessler, voted against the will of its government and can face up to 10 years in prison for doing so.

=== US ===
Prior to the emergence of ecology as a scientific discipline, large-scale restoration began with big game restoration in the early 20th century. The first native plant restoration project in the United States was established in 1907 by Eloise Butler in Minneapolis, Minnesota. This was followed by the Vassar College Ecological Laboratory restoration program, founded by Professor Edith Roberts in 1921. The first tallgrass prairie restoration was the 1936 Curtis Prairie at the University of Wisconsin–Madison Arboretum. Civilian Conservation Corps workers replanted nearby prairie species onto a former horse pasture, overseen by university faculty including Aldo Leopold, Theodore Sperry, Henry C. Greene, and John T. Curtis. The UW Arboretum was the center of tallgrass prairie research through the first half of the 20th century and the study of techniques like prescribed burning. It was followed by the 40-hectare Schulenberg Prairie at the Morton Arboretum, initiated in 1962 by Ray Schulenberg and Robert Betz. Betz then worked with The Nature Conservancy to establish the 260-hectare Fermi National Laboratory tallgrass prairie in 1974. Restoration ecology emerged as a distinct sub-discipline of ecology and natural resources management with the dramatic increase in the number of protected natural areas in the 1980s. In 1997 the National Wildlife Federation signed a memorandum of understanding with the Intertribal Bison Cooperative, the first-ever conservation agreement between an environmental organization and an inter-tribal group, to advocate for the restoration of wild bison to tribal lands. Anishinaabek/Neshnabék throughout the Great Lakes region are leading ecological restoration projects that, in the words of Kyle Whyte, "seek to learn from, adapt, and put into practice local human and nonhuman relationships and stories at the convergence of deep Anishinaabe history and the disruptiveness of industrial settler campaigns."

=== Australia ===
Australia has been the site of historically significant ecological restoration projects, commencing in the 1930s. These projects were responses to the extensive environmental damage inflicted by colonising settlers, following the forced dispossession of the First Nations communities of Australia. The substantial Traditional Ecological Knowledge of First Nations communities was not utilised in the historical restoration projects.

Many of the first Australian settler restoration projects were initiated by volunteers, often in the form of community groups. Many of these volunteers appreciated and utilised science resources, such as botanical and ecological knowledge. Local and state government agencies participated, and also industry. Australian scientists came to play an increasingly important role. A prominent scientist who took an interest in the reversal of vegetation degradation was botanist and plant ecologist Professor T G Osborn, University of Adelaide, who, in the 1920s, conducted pioneering research into the causes of arid-zone indigenous vegetation degradation. From this time, Australian botanists, plant ecologists and soil erosion researchers have increasingly developed interests in the recovery of ecological functioning on degraded sites.

The earliest known attempt by Australian settlers to restore a degraded natural ecosystem commenced in 1896, at Nairm (as it is known to people of the Kulin nation), or Port Phillip Bay, Melbourne. Local government and community groups replanted degraded areas of the foreshore reserves with the indigenous plant species, coastal teatree (Leptospermum laevigatum). The projects were motivated by utilitarian considerations: to conserve recreation sites, and promote tourism. However, some local residents, including Australian journalist, nature writer and amateur ornithologist, Donald Macdonald, were distressed at the loss of valued biological qualities, and campaigned to fully restore the Teatree ecosystems and conserve them and their indigenous fauna.

The degraded arid-zone regions of Australia were the site of historical ecological restoration projects. Pastoral industry established in the arid-zone regions of South Australia and New South Wales resulted in the substantial degradation of these areas by ca.1900 resulting in severe wind erosion. From approximately 1930, Australian pastoralists implemented revegetation projects aiming to the substantial to full restoration of indigenous flora to degraded, wind eroded areas.

At his arid-zone Koonamore research station in South Australia, established in 1925, Professor T G Osborn studied the loss of indigenous vegetation caused by overstocking and the resultant wind erosion and degradation, concluding that restoration of the indigenous saltbushes (Atriplex spp.), bluebushes (Maireana spp.) and mulga (Acacia aneura) vegetation communities was possible, if a stock exclosure and natural regeneration revegetation technique was applied to degraded paddocks. Most likely influenced by Osborn's research, throughout the 1930s South Australian pastoralists adopted this revegetation technique. For example, at Wirraminna station (or property, ranch), following fencing to exclude stock, severe soil-drifts were fully revegetated and stabilised through natural regeneration of the indigenous vegetation. It was also found that furrowing (or ploughing) of eroded areas resulted in the natural regeneration of indigenous vegetation. So successful were these programs that the South Australian government adopted them as approved state soil conservation policies in 1936. Legislation introduced in 1939 codified these policies.

In 1936 mining assayer Albert Morris and his restoration colleagues initiated the Broken Hill regeneration area project. This project involved the natural regeneration of indigenous flora on a severely wind eroded site of hundreds of hectares, located in arid western New South Wales. Local and state governments, and the Broken Hill mining industry, supported and funded the project. In fact, as the regeneration area project was so well adapted to the harsh arid-zone conditions, the New South Wales state government adopted it as a model for the proposed restoration of the twenty million hectares of the arid western portion of the state that had been reduced to a severely eroded condition. Legislation to this effect was passed in 1949.

Another significant early Australian settler ecological restoration project occurred on the north coast of New South Wales. From approximately 1840 settlers forcibly occupied the coastal hinterlands, dispossessed First Nations communities, destroyed extensive areas of biologically diverse rainforest and converted the land to farms. Only small patches of rainforest survived. In 1935 dairy farmer Ambrose Crawford began restoring a degraded four acre (1.7 hectare) patch of local rainforest, or "Big Scrub" (Lowland Tropical Rainforest), as it was referred to, at Lumley Park reserve, Alstonville. His main restoration techniques were clearing weeds that were smothering the rainforest plants and planting of suitable indigenous rainforest species. Crawford utilised professional government botanists as advisors, and received support from his local government council. The restored rainforest reserve still exists today.

=== United Kingdom ===
==== Natural Capital Committee's recommendation for a 25-year plan ====
The UK Natural Capital Committee (NCC) made a recommendation in its second State of Natural Capital report published in March 2014 that in order to meet the Government's goal of being the first generation to leave the environment in a better state than it was inherited, a long-term 25-year plan was needed to maintain and improve England's natural capital.

The Secretary of State for the UK's Department for Environment, Food and Rural Affairs, Owen Paterson, described his ambition for the natural environment and how the work of the Committee fits into this at an NCC event in November 2012: "I do not, however, just want to maintain our natural assets; I want to improve them. I want us to derive the greatest possible benefit from them, while ensuring that they are available for generations to come. This is what the NCC's innovative work is geared towards".

== Traditional ecological knowledge ==
Traditional ecological knowledge (TEK) from Indigenous Peoples demonstrates how restoration ecology is a historical field, lived out by humans for thousands of years. Indigenous people have acquired ecological knowledge through observation, experience, and management of the natural resources and the environment around them. In the past, they managed their environment and changed the structure of the vegetation to not only meet their basic needs (food, water, shelter, medicines) but also to improve desired characteristics and even increasing the populations and biodiversity. In that way, they achieved a close relationship with the environment and learned lessons that indigenous people keep in their culture.

This means there is much that could be learned from local people indigenous to the ecosystem being restored because of the deep connection and biocultural and linguistic diversity of place. The use of natural resources by indigenous people considers many cultural, social, and environmental aspects, since they have always had an intimate connection with the animals and plants around them over centuries since they obtained their livelihood from the environment around them.

Restoration ecologists must consider that TEK is place dependent due to intimate connection and thus when engaging Indigenous Peoples to include knowledge for restoration purposes, respect and care must be taken to avoid appropriation of the TEK. Successful ecological restoration which includes Indigenous Peoples must be led by Indigenous Peoples to ensure non-indigenous people acknowledge the unequal relationship of power. One way of doing so is using the "walking on two legs" framework created by Secwépemc elder Chief Dr. Ronald E. Ignice, which states that TEK and Western knowledge are two legs that should be driven by Indigenous minds.

For example, the California Indians have a rigid and complex harvesting, management and production practice, largely typical horticultural techniques and concentrated forest burning. The California Indians had a rich knowledge of ecology and natural techniques to understand burn patterns, plant material, cultivation, pruning, digging; what was edible vs. what was not. This knowledge extends into wildlife management – how abundant, where the distribution was, and how diverse the large mammal population was. While the United States has counteracted the degradation, fragmentation and loss of habitat through land set aside from all human influence, indigenous practices could inform ecosystem restoration and wildlife management.

== Related journals ==
- Restoration Ecology, journal of the Society for Ecological Restoration (SER)
- Ecological Management & Restoration, published by the Ecological Society of Australia (ESA)
- Ecological Restoration, published by the University of Wisconsin Press

== See also ==
- Applied ecology
- Bioremediation – Process used to treat contaminated media such as water and soil
- Bush regeneration – Type of ecological restoration in Australia
- Conservation biology – Study of threats to biological diversity
- Desert greening – Process of man-made reclamation of deserts
- Ecological design – Design approach sensitive to environmental impacts
- Ecological engineering – Environmental engineering
- Ecological triage
- Ecologically based invasive plant management
- Floodplain restoration – Restoration of a river's floodplain
- Forest restoration – Actions to reinstate forest health
- Groundwater remediation – Process used to treat polluted groundwater
- Island restoration – Ecological restoration of islands and island groups
- Land rehabilitation – Part of environmental remediation
- Nature Restoration Law – Regulation of the European Union
- Reconciliation ecology – Study of maintaining biodiversity in human-dominated ecosystems
- Restoration economy – Economic activity associated with regenerative land use
- Riparian zone restoration – Ecological restoration of river banks and floodplains
- Stream restoration – Work to improve the environmental health of a river or stream
