= Triage (film) =

- Directed by: Danis Tanović
- Written by: Danis Tanović
- Produced by: Marc Baschet
- Starring: Colin Farrell; Paz Vega; Christopher Lee; Branko Đurić
- Distributed by: Parallel Films; HanWay Films; E1 Entertainment
- Release date: November 9, 2009
- Running time: 100 min
- Countries: Ireland; France; Spain
- Languages: English; Kurdish; Spanish
- Box office: $558,451

Triage is a 2009 drama film written and directed by Danis Tanović and starring Colin Farrell, Paz Vega, Branko Đurić and Christopher Lee. The film’s plot is a dark tale of a photojournalist (Farrell) who comes home after a dangerous assignment in Kurdistan during the 1988, Anfal genocide against the Kurdish people. The film focuses on the psychological effects of war on a photo journalist. It is based on the novel Triage by American veteran war correspondent Scott Anderson.

== Plot ==
In 1988, Mark Walsh (Colin Farrell) is a photojournalist who has earned a reputation for working in some of the most unforgiving locations on Earth. When his editor Amy (Juliet Stevenson) asks him to cover Saddam Hussein's campaign against the Kurds, Mark takes the assignment and thinks little of it. His wife Elena (Paz Vega) is considerably more concerned. Mark and his friend and fellow photographer David (Jamie Sives) head off to the war full of confidence. Mark takes photographs of brutally injured soldiers and of a doctor who shoots them dead to spare their suffering. Later on, Mark is seen mildly injured in what he claims to be an accident in the river and he then comes home alone after being separated from David. Elena notices that he is like a different person, gaunt and unable to relax.

Elena can't get Mark to talk about what he saw that left him so traumatized, so she invites her grandfather Joaquin (Christopher Lee), a veteran psychoanalyst with military experience, for a visit to see if he can help. Joaquin struggles to get Mark to open up. The grandfather's presence ignites an old conflict between him and Elena; the doctor was a supporter of Franco during the Spanish Civil War. He had helped Franco's soldiers recover from the guilt of the atrocities they had committed in warfare. Elena had never been able to forgive him for his actions.

Joaquin is patient and persistent in getting Mark to face his own memories. Joaquin is particularly curious as to why Mark is more concerned with bringing bodies back to their families rather than survival or death. While Mark is drawing a picture of the area he and David were situated, Diane (Kelly Reilly), David's pregnant wife and Elena enter the apartment and Joaquin tells him he has to come clean with what happened. A flashback reveals that Mark followed David when he decided to leave early. While walking back to the Kurdish camp, they were shelled, which resulted in David losing both of his legs. Mark tried to carry him back.

After he tells them this story, Diane begins labour, and is taken to the hospital, where she delivers a baby girl. Mark, Elena, and Joaquin visit Diane in the hospital. Unable to tell Diane the "end of the story," Mark walks up to the roof and considers jumping. Joaquin and Elena follow him and he tells them that he had jumped in a river with David's arms wrapped around his neck and that once in the water, he could no longer breathe. He released David from his grip and let him go. He tearfully admits that he felt guilty about not bringing him home, and Elena embraces him.

The film ends with a quote attributed to Plato: (Note: The quote is not found in Plato's works and the earliest known source for the quote is from philosopher George Santayana in 1922.) "Only the dead see the end of the war."

== Cast ==
- Colin Farrell as Mark Walsh
- Paz Vega as Elena Morales
- Christopher Lee as Joaquin Morales
- Branko Đurić as Dr. Talzani
- Kelly Reilly as Diane
- Jamie Sives as David
- Reece Ritchie as Boy in Beirut
- Juliet Stevenson as Amy
- Ian McElhinney as Ivan

== Locations ==
Shooting ran from April to June with locations in Ireland and at the Ciudad de la Luz studios in Alicante in Spain.

== Reception ==
Michael Rechtshaffen gave a negative review in The Hollywood Reporter: "While Tanovic has an undeniable gift for potent visuals, his adaptation of the Scott Anderson novel is considerably less assured, with over-written dialogue that continually comments on the obvious."
