= William Jordyn =

William Jordyn may refer to:

- William Jordyn (died 1602), MP for Shaftesbury
- William Jordyn (died 1623), MP for Westbury

== See also ==
- William Jordan (disambiguation)
- William Jorden
