= Henry C. Greene =

American mycologist

Henry Campbell Greene (December 13, 1904 – April 27, 1967) was an American mycologist at the University of Wisconsin. He was involved in the study of low prairie habitat and initiated the restoration, preservation, and protection of a parcel of restored prairie land. Greene co-discovered Golovinomyces ambrosiae (=Erysiphe sparsa) and Golovinomyces latisporus (=Erysiphe cichoracearum var. latispora). He committed suicide.
