= Restoration Ecology (journal) =

- Discipline: Restoration ecology
- Language: English
- Edited by: Stephen Murphy

Publication details
- History: 1993–present
- Publisher: Wiley-Blackwell on behalf of the Society for Ecological Restoration
- Frequency: Bimonthly
- Impact factor: 2.721 (2019)

Standard abbreviations
- ISO 4: Restor. Ecol.

Indexing
- ISSN: 1061-2971 (print); 1526-100X (web)
- LCCN: sn99004219
- OCLC no.: 516485512

Links
- Journal homepage; Online access; Online archive

Restoration Ecology is a bimonthly peer-reviewed scientific journal covering research on restoration ecology. It was established in 1993 and is published by Wiley-Blackwell on behalf of the Society for Ecological Restoration. The editor-in-chief is Stephen Murphy (University of Waterloo).

== Abstracting and indexing ==
The journal is abstracted and indexed in:

- Aquatic Sciences and Fisheries Abstracts
- Biological Abstracts
- BIOSIS Previews
- CAB Abstracts
- Current Contents/Agriculture, Biology & Environmental Sciences
- EBSCO databases
- GEOBASE
- PASCAL
- ProQuest databases
- Science Citation Index Expanded
- Scopus
- The Zoological Record

According to the Journal Citation Reports, the journal has a 2019 impact factor of 2.721.
