= Society for Ecological Restoration =

US non-profit organization

- Abbreviation: SER
- Legal status: non-profit
- Fields: Ecological restoration
- Members: 4000 (2023)
- Official language: English
- Board of directors: Kingsley Dixon, Karma Bouazza, Ramesh Venkataraman, Laura Graham
- Website: www.ser.org

The Society for Ecological Restoration (SER) is a conservation organization based in the United States, supporting a "global community of restoration professionals that includes researchers, practitioners, decision-makers, and community leaders". The organization was founded in 1988. The mission of the organization is to: "advance the science, practice and policy of ecological restoration to sustain biodiversity, improve resilience in a changing climate, and re-establish an ecologically healthy relationship between nature and culture."

SER produces definitions and standards for the practice of ecological restoration, including the SER International Primer on Ecological Restoration (2004), International Standards for the Practice of Ecological Restoration (2016), and a certification program for professionals: Certified Ecological Restoration Practitioner (CERP).
