= William R. Jordan III =

American botanist and journalist

William R. Jordan
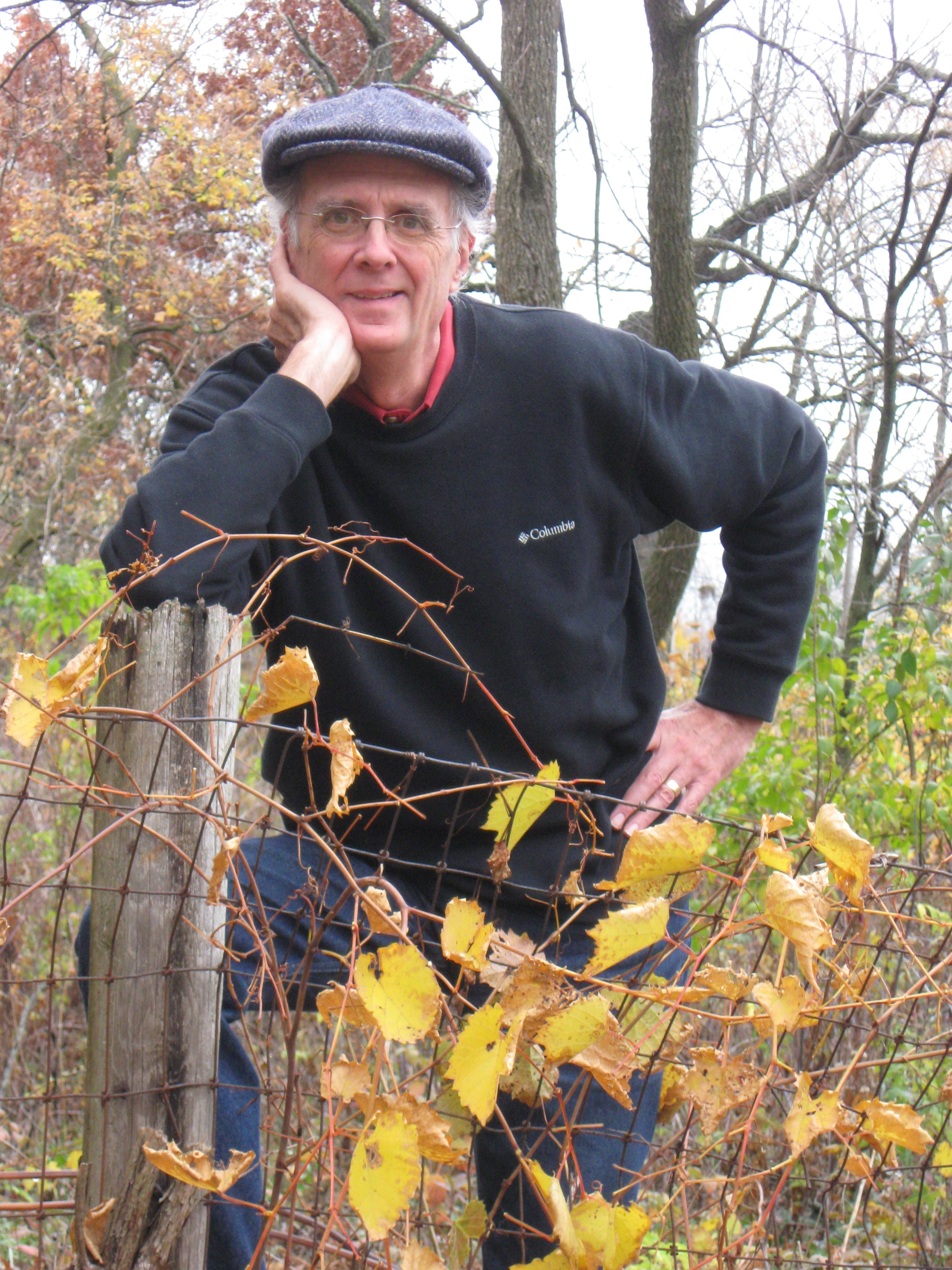
- Photo by Barbara Jordan
- Born: William R. Jordan III; 1944; Denver
- Education: University of Wisconsin-Madison, Marquette University
- Occupation: Journalist
- Known for: Environmental thinker
- Board member of: Society of Ecological Restoration

Bill Jordan (born 1944), more formally William R. Jordan III, is an American botanist and journalist who has played a leading role in the development and critique of ecological restoration as a means of developing an environmentalism that is philosophically more coherent, psychologically more productive, politically more robust, and ecologically more effective. His critique has had a significant influence on environmentalism in the United States and abroad.

Jordan worked for 24 years at the University of Wisconsin's Arboretum in Madison. This was the site of early attempts to recreate historic ecological communities, such as tallgrass prairies and maple forests, an effort led by the famed conservationist Aldo Leopold. In 1981 Jordan founded and served as editor of the journal Restoration & Management Notes (now Ecological Restoration), and he was a founding member of the Society of Ecological Restoration.

He has been called the first person to write consistently about the interplay between humans and nature within the context of ecological restoration, the most influential writer on restoration, and a world leader in the field.

== Early life and education ==
Jordan was born in Denver. His mother was an English teacher and his father a forester who advised clients on land-management projects, including various forms of environmental rehabilitation.

He earned a B.S. in biology from Marquette University in 1966, a PhD in botany from the University of Wisconsin-Madison in 1971, and an MA in journalism in 1975, also from the University of Wisconsin-Madison.

He lives in Madison, Wisconsin.

== Career ==
In 1981, working at the University of Wisconsin arboretum, Jordan founded and edited the journal Restoration & Management Notes (now Ecological Restoration), recognized as the first journal to deal exclusively with the subject of restoration ecology.

In 1984 he organized a symposium to undertake the first systematic exploration of the value of restoration as a technique for basic ecological research. He was senior editor of the resulting book, Restoration Ecology: A Synthetic Approach to Ecological Research.

He was a founding member of the Society of Ecological Restoration (1989) and served as SER’s supervisor of administration for its first five years (1989-1993).

Since 2001 Jordan has been director of the New Academy for Nature and Culture and editor of its online journal Environmental Prospect.

== Philosophy ==
Jordan’s critique of environmental thinking stems from his reflections on the pioneering ecological restoration project initiated by Aldo Leopold and a handful of colleagues at the UW-Madison Arboretum in the mid-1930s, and on Leopold’s reflections on land management in "The Land Ethic," the concluding essay in his book A Sand County Almanac. Jordan saw this project, with its commitment to restoration of historic ecosystems, as an early contribution to the development of a form of land management that offers a way for people to achieve what Leopold had called "membership in the land community."

However, drawing on the work of literary critic and poet Frederick Turner, Jordan developed a critical perspective on Leopold's idea of community, which Jordan feels is limited by its exclusion of negative emotions, specifically shame.

Jordan defines shame, which he distinguishes from guilt, as the emotional response to the self’s awareness of its dependence on others, including animals and plants—in having, for example, to kill and eat them to survive. This shame, he argues, is “not the response of conscience to what we do, but of consciousness of what we are."

Our shameful feelings, as Jordan understands them, are not a condemnation of human existence but rather the raw material for the creation of the values that make human life worthwhile. Frederick Turner argues that ritual and the fine arts (which Jordan terms the “technologies of the imagination”) provide the tools humans need to deal productively with this aspect of experience.

In Jordan's recasting, ritual and the arts offer a way to foster values such as community and beauty that Leopold made the foundation of his land ethic. Jordan argues that they have played this role throughout human history, sometimes citing the anthropologist E.N. Anderson, who wrote that "All traditional societies that have succeeded in managing resources well over time, have done it in part through religious or ritual representation of resource management."

Jordan argues that the lack of such shared rituals, typical of modern societies, is the crucial factor limiting progress toward realization of a sound ethic of relationship between humans and the rest of nature.

Considering ecological restoration from this perspective, Jordan proposes its development as a modern version of the "world renewal" rituals characteristic of many traditional societies. Acknowledging the difficulty, uncertainty, and ultimately even the impossibility of restoration, he sees these qualities as essential to the value of restoration as an encounter with human limitations, and so with shame and the experience of transcendent values.

Examples of restoration, not yet fully ritualized, but clearly being developed as spectacle or performing art include: the conversion of tree girdling to a work of art by Wisconsin artist Barbara Westfall; nighttime prairie burns to which the public are invited in northern Illinois; and classes in reflective restoration offered at Eckerd College in Florida.

== Bibliography ==
Books

- Restoration Ecology: A Synthetic Approach to Ecological Research (1987) ISBN 9780521337281
- The Sunflower Forest: Ecological Restoration and the New Communion with Nature. (2003) ISBN 978-0520233201
- Making Nature Whole: A History of Ecological Restoration (2011), with George M. Lubick ISBN 978-1597265133

Essays

- “Beyond preservation,” pp. 6–11, Orion, Autumn, 1983
- “Restoration ecology: An environmental middle ground,” (with John D. Aber) p. 399, BioScience, 35(7), July/August, 1985
- “Restoration and the reentry of nature,” pp. 14–25, Orion, Spring, 1986
- “On ecological restoration,” North American Review, June, 1988
- “Restoration ecology: A synthetic approach to ecological research, IN Rehabilitating Damaged Ecosystems, Vol 1, (CRC Press, 1988)
- “Ecological restoration: Reflections on a half-century of experience at the University of Wisconsin-Madison Arboretum,” IN Biodiversity, E.O. Wilson et al., editors, (Washington, D.C., National Academy Press, 1988)
- “Restoration: Shaping the land, transforming the human spirit,” pp. 22–23, Whole Earth Review, Spring, 1990
- “Rituals of restoration,” pp 23–26 IN The Humanist, November/December, 1993
- “Renewal and imagination: Thoreau’s thought and the restoration of Walden Pond,” pp. 260–71 IN Thoreau’s World and Ours, Edmund A. Schofield and Robert C. Baron, editors, (Golden, CO: North American Press, 1993)
- “Restoration as a technique for identifying and characterizing human influences on ecosystems", pp 271–279 IN Humans as Components of Ecosystems (Mark J. McDonnell and Steward T.A. Pickett, editors, (New York: Springer Verlag, 1993)
- “Restoration, community and wilderness,” in Restoring Nature: Perspectives from the Social Sciences and Humanities, Paul Gobster and R. Bruce Hull, editors, (Washington, D.C.: Island Press, 2000)
- "Ecological restoration and the uncomfortable, beautiful middle ground". With Alex Turner. IN Healing Natures: Repairing Relationships, Robert L. France, editor (Sheffield, VT: Green Frigate Books, 2008)
- "Foundations of conduct: A theory of values and its implications for environmentalism". With Nathaniel F. Barrett, Kip Curtis, Liam Heneghan, Randall Honold, Todd LeVasseur, Anna Peterson, Leslie Paul Thiel, and Gretl Van Wieren, IN Environmental Ethics Sep, 2012.
- Nathaniel Barrett and William R. Jordan III. "Notes on the new ecology and the creation of value". pp. 333–344 IN The Routledge Companion to Religion and Science (Routledge: London & New York, 2012)
- "Therefore the Winds: Some thoughts on the “Roots” ", pp. 178–196 IN Religion and Ecological Crisis: The “Lynn White Thesis at Fifty”. edited by Todd Levasseur and Anna Peterson, New York: Routledge, 2017, pp. 178–196).
