= Takashi Yamaguchi =

Takashi Yamaguchi may refer to:

- Takashi Yamaguchi (architect) (born 1953), Japanese architect
- Takashi Yamaguchi (actor, born 1936) (1936–2025), Japanese actor
- Takashi Yamaguchi (actor, born 1974), Japanese actor
