= Ashraf Barhom =

Palestinian actor

Ashraf Barhoum
- أشرف برهوم
- Born: January 8, 1979 (age 47); Ma'alot-Tarshiha, Israel
- Other name: Ashraf Barhoum
- Occupation: Actor

Ashraf Barhom (Arabic: أشرف برهوم, Hebrew: אשרף ברהום; born January 8, 1979) is an Israeli actor.

He was born in Tarshiha, in Galilee. He has starred in The Kingdom, Paradise Now, By Any Means and The Syrian Bride.

== Early life ==
Barhom grew up in an Arab Christian family in Israel, in the Galilee region, in a small village called Tarshiha. He attended the University of Haifa, where he graduated with a B.A. in Theatre and Arts. He has three sisters. Of his ethnic heritage, Barhom has said:

When we attach ourselves to national identities, then we enter into a cycle of conflict. I didn't choose where I was born or who to be or what people would call me. I'm a hybrid, from a cultural perspective, but I don't think in these terms. I'm more simple than that. I'm a mammal who will live 70 years more or less, who believes in God and likes his life.

== Career ==
In 2007, he garnered much attention for appearing alongside Jamie Foxx in the movie The Kingdom as Col. Faris Al-Ghazi. He has since appeared in such Israeli films as Ahava Colombianit (Colombian Love) and Lebanon. He is also notable for starring in Agora, portraying the 5th century AD Alexandrian parabalani monk Ammonius, in the 2010 remake of Clash of the Titans as the bounty hunter Ozal, and in Ralph Fiennes' 2011 adaptation of Shakespeare's Coriolanus. In July 2013 it was announced that Barhom had been cast in FX's series Tyrant.

== Filmography ==
=== Film ===
Year	Title	Role	Notes
2002	In the 9th Month	Ahmad	
2004	Ahava Colombianit	Samir	
2004	The Syrian Bride	Marwan	
2005	Paradise Now	Abu-Karem	
2007	The Kingdom	Colonel Faris Al Ghazi	
2009	Agora	Ammonius	
2009	Lebanon	1st Phalangist	
2010	Clash of the Titans	Ozal	
2011	Coriolanus	Cassius	
2012	Inheritance	Marwan	
2012	Zaytoun	PLO Fighter	
2014	300: Rise of an Empire	General Bandari	
2014	The Savior	Judas Iscariot	
2015	The Idol	Hehler - The Smuggler	
2015	Al munataf	Radi	
2019	Sayidat Al Bahr	Amer	
2021	The Stranger		
2021	Farha	Abu Farha	
2025	I'm Glad You're Dead Now	Abu Rashid	

=== Television ===
Year	Title	Role	Notes
2013	By Any Means	Ahmed	Episode 1.5
2014–2016	Tyrant	Jamal	25 episodes
2025	House of David	Doeg	Main cast
