= Declan Quinn =

American cinematographer (born 1957)

- Born: 1957 (age 67–68); Chicago, Illinois, U.S.
- Occupation: Cinematographer
- Spouse: Etta Quinn
- Children: 4

Declan Quinn (born 1957) is an American cinematographer. He is a three-time winner of the Independent Spirit Award for Best Cinematography.

== Early life ==
Born and raised in Chicago, Illinois, Quinn is one of four children. His mother, Teresa, was a homemaker, and also worked as a bookkeeper and in the travel business, and his father, Michael Quinn, was a professor of literature. His four siblings, the most famous of whom is Aidan, are actors. The family moved to Ireland when he was in his teens, but he returned to the United States to earn a degree in film from Columbia College Chicago.

== Career ==
In Ireland, he met Bono and U2 at the Windmill Lane Studios in Dublin, and he began his career filming several music videos and the documentaries U2: Unforgettable Fire (1984) and U2: Outside It's America (1987) for the group.

Quinn permanently returned to the States in 1989 and filmed The Kill-Off.

In 1991, he served as cinematographer on Tim Hunter's well-received Lies of the Twins, starring Isabella Rossellini, Iman, and Declan's brother Aidan.

Quinn has collaborated with director Mira Nair on five projects, including Kama Sutra: A Tale of Love, Monsoon Wedding, Vanity Fair, and Hysterical Blindness, which earned him a nomination for the Emmy Award for Best Cinematography for a Miniseries or Movie. Additional credits include 2x4, (which won him the Cinematography Award at the 1998 Sundance Film Festival), Vanya on 42nd Street, Leaving Las Vegas, One True Thing, In America, Cold Creek Manor, The Lucky Ones, Rachel Getting Married, The Private Lives of Pippa Lee and The Reluctant Fundamentalist (2012).

== Personal life ==
Quinn resides in Orange County, New York with his wife Etta and four daughters.

== Filmography ==
=== Film ===
Short film

Year	Title	Director	Notes
1984	U2: Unforgettable Fire	Barry Devlin	Documentary short
2002	India	Mira Nair	Segment of 11'09"01 September 11
2008	How can it be?	Mira Nair	Segment of 8
2008	New York, I Love You	Mira Nair	1 segment
2013	The Tale of Timmy Two Chins	Nancy Savoca	With Mauricio Rubinstein
2014	The Suffering Kind	Kevin Liddy	Also producer
2019	Nafas	Mira Nair	
2020	New York Our Time	Vivienne Dick	

Documentary film

Year	Title	Director	Notes
1987	U2: Outside It's America	Barry Devlin	
1992	Cousin Bobby	Jonathan Demme	With Ernest Dickerson, Craig Haagensen, Tony C. Jannelli and Jacek Laskus
2007	Man from Plains	Jonathan Demme	
2009	Neil Young Trunk Show	Jonathan Demme	
2011	Neil Young Journeys	Jonathan Demme	
2016	Sidemen: Long Road to Glory	Scott D. Rosenbaum	Interviews with Gregg Allman and Warren Haynes
2016	Justin Timberlake + the Tennessee Kids	Jonathan Demme	Concert film
2022	Jersey Boys LIVE	Des McAnuff	Concert film

Feature film

Year	Title	Director	Notes
1987	The Clash of the Ash	Fergus Tighe	
1989	The Kill-Off	Maggie Greenwald	
1991	Blood and Concrete	Jeffrey Reiner	
1991	Freddy's Dead: The Final Nightmare	Rachel Talalay	
1992	The Bargain Shop	Johnny Gogan	
1993	The Ballad of Little Jo	Maggie Greenwald	
1993	Daniel Lanois: Rocky World	Philip King	With Mark Mackay and Brendan Galvin
1994	Vanya on 42nd Street	Louis Malle	
1995	Leaving Las Vegas	Mike Figgis	
1996	Carried Away	Bruno Barreto	
1996	Kama Sutra: A Tale of Love	Mira Nair	
1997	One Night Stand	Mike Figgis	
1998	2by4	Jimmy Smallhorne	
1998	This Is My Father	Paul Quinn	Also executive producer
1998	One True Thing	Carl Franklin	
1999	Flawless	Joel Schumacher	
2000	28 Days	Betty Thomas	
2001	Monsoon Wedding	Mira Nair	
2002	In America	Jim Sheridan	
2003	Cold Creek Manor	Mike Figgis	
2004	Vanity Fair	Mira Nair	
2005	Breakfast on Pluto	Neil Jordan	
2005	Get Rich or Die Tryin'	Jim Sheridan	
2008	The Lucky Ones	Neil Burger	
2008	Rachel Getting Married	Jonathan Demme	
2008	Pride and Glory	Gavin O'Connor	
2009	The Private Lives of Pippa Lee	Rebecca Miller	
2011	The Moth Diaries	Mary Harron	
2012	Being Flynn	Paul Weitz	
2012	The Reluctant Fundamentalist	Mira Nair	
2013	Admission	Paul Weitz	
2013	A Master Builder	Jonathan Demme	
2015	Hot Tub Time Machine 2	Steve Pink	
2015	Ricki and the Flash	Jonathan Demme	
2017	The Shack	Stuart Hazeldine	
2018	Black '47	Lance Daly	
2019	Otherhood	Cindy Chupack	
2020	The Evening Hour	Braden King	
2020	Sylvie's Love	Eugene Ashe	
2022	Better Nate Than Ever	Tim Federle	
2024	TWIG	Marian Quinn	
2024	Descendants: The Rise of Red	Jennifer Phang	

Filmed stage productions

Year	Title	Director
2008	Rent: Filmed Live on Broadway	Michael John Warren
2013	Shrek the Musical	Michael John Warren
2020	Hamilton	Thomas Kail
2021	Diana	Christopher Ashley

=== Television ===
Year	Title	Director	Notes
1990	ABC Afterschool Special	Nancy Cooperstein	Episode "Over the Limit"
1991	American Playhouse	Noel Black	Episode "The Hollow Boy"
1993	Fallen Angels	Phil Joanou; Jonathan Kaplan	Episodes "Dead-End for Delia" and "Since I Don't Have You"
1994	Screen Two	Barry Devlin	Episode "All Things Bright and Beautiful"
1995	Out of Order	Leslie Libman; Larry Williams	Episode "Strange Habit"
2018	My Next Guest Needs No Introduction with David Letterman	Michael Bonfiglio	5 episodes
2018	The Bobby Brown Story	Kiel Adrian Scott	
2020	A Suitable Boy	Mira Nair; Shimit Amin	Miniseries
2022	National Treasure: Edge of History	Mira Nair	Episode "I'm a Ghost"

TV movies

Year	Title	Director
1991	Lies of the Twins	Tim Hunter
1992	The Heart of Justice	Bruno Barreto
2002	Hysterical Blindness	Mira Nair
2014	Line of Sight	Jonathan Demme
2018	Notes from the Field	Kristi Zea

TV specials

Year	Title	Director	Notes
2015	Neighborhood Sessions: Jennifer Lopez	Alex Coletti	Live show
2015	Neighborhood Sessions: Toby Keith	Stephen C. Mitchell	
2019	Gary Gulman: The Great Depresh	Michael Bonfiglio	With Michael Richard Martin and Robert Richman
2022	Hasan Minhaj: The King's Jester	Prashanth Venkataramanujam	Stand-up comedy
