= The Kill-Off (novel) =

1957 novel by Jim Thompson

- First edition
- Author: Jim Thompson
- Language: English
- Genre: Crime fiction
- Publisher: Lion Books
- Publication date: 1957
- Publication place: United States

The Kill-Off is an American crime novel by Jim Thompson first published in 1957, and reprinted by Vintage Crime/Black Lizard in 1999. The novel is a bleak tale of murder in a small, dying resort town being torn apart by gossip, racism, incest (actual or alleged), alcoholism and financial difficulties. It was adapted into a film in 1990.

== Plot introduction ==
The Kill-Off relates the events leading up to the inevitable murder of Luane Devore, a hypochondriac hated in the seaside town of Manduwoc for her malicious gossip. Each chapter provides a partial first person account from a different character, all of whom are unreliable, to an unidentified audience. The result is a sprawling network of possibilities and suspicions with no ultimately trustworthy account.

== Plot summary ==
Manduwoc, a small seaside resort town (located "a few hours train-ride from New York City" (6)) has been suffering financially from gradual loss of its tourist trade, and morally from gossip spread by Luane Devore about the seedy activities of the town's inhabitants. Before the murder even happens, numerous characters are viewed as potential suspects, notably the psychotic Bobbie Ashton, whose future was ruined when Luane revealed him as the bastard offspring of a mixed-race relation. Also involved in the potential crime is the suspected hoard of money Luane keeps from her husband Ralph's earnings. When finally Luane is found dead, having fallen down a flight of stairs, the characters scramble to establish their alibis. Ultimately local businessman Pete Pavlov confesses to unintentionally having pushed Luane down the stairs during a confrontation, although he suspects that Luane did not die immediately but was killed by a third person.

== Characters ==
- Luane Devore A paranoid hypochondriac who keeps to her room while spreading malicious rumors (some of which may be true) about the locals.
- Ralph Devore Luane's younger, good-looking and hard-working husband, he hoards the money he makes working odd jobs, although Luane keeps control of it. He falls in love with Danny Lee, and struggles to find a way to get his money and to separate from Luane. He is rumored to be Luane's son as well as her husband.
- Dr. Jim Ashton The local doctor, he moved to Manduwoc to conceal his sexual and intellectual relationship with Hattie, a Negro woman who bore his son Bobbie.
- Bobbie Ashton Bright and outwardly good natured, Bobbie conceals (to all but his parents and girlfriend) a psychotic character resulting in part from his parents' illegitimate relationship and his sexual desire for his mother.
- Hattie Dr. Ashton's mistress and housekeeper, she fell in love with Ashton from gratitude for his benevolence and his intellectual attention, but was cast off when her pregnancy (and refusal to have an abortion) led to his professional disgrace. She lives in fear of Bobbie.
- Pete Pavlov Local contractor facing bankruptcy because of Manduwoc's decline. Almost universally hated and distrusted, Pavlov is at bottom an honest man whose hateful attitude arose in response to having been swindled by Luane's father.
- Myra Pavlov Pete Pavlov's daughter and Bobbie Ashton's girlfriend, she lacks personality and will power. She lives in fear of her father and allows herself to be abused by Bobbie. She was forced into a drug addiction by Bobbie, although she does not mention this in her narrative.
- Danny Lee A reluctant prostitute turned singer, she is brought to Manduwoc by Rags McGuire. She falls in love with Ralph Devore.
- Rags McGuire A famous jazz musician fallen on hard times because of his unwillingness to adopt to popular musical trends. He lives in denial of the death of his two sons, and the disfigurement of his wife, in an auto accident.
- Kossmeyer Luane's lawyer, prone to anger.
- Henry Clay Williams Local prosecutor, ambitious but dull-witted. His position is threatened by local rumor that he has an incestuous relationship with his sister.
- Marmaduke "Goofy" Gannder Town drunk and madman, he prowls through the town looking for booze.

== Film, TV or theatrical adaptations ==
The Kill-Off was made into a 1989 film directed by Maggie Greenwald.
