= Orestes (prefect of Egypt) =

5th century CE Roman governor of Egypt

Orestes (fl. 415 AD) was a Roman state official serving as governor of the diocese of Egypt (the Augustal prefect) in 415. During his term of office, he was engaged in a violent feud with the bishop of Alexandria, Cyril, and their struggle precipitated the death of the philosopher and scientist Hypatia.

== Biography ==
In 415, during his office, he clashed with the young bishop of Alexandria, Cyril, who had been appointed shortly before Orestes to succeed to the Patriarchate of Alexandria after the death of Theophilus, Cyril's own uncle. On one occasion, Cyril sent the grammaticus Hierax to discover the content of an edict that Orestes was to promulgate on the mimes shows, which attracted great crowds. When some Jews, with whom Cyril had clashed before, discovered the presence of Hierax, they rioted. Then Orestes had Hierax tortured in public in a theatre. This order had two aims: the first was to quell the riot, the other to mark Orestes' authority on Cyril.

According to Christian sources, the Jews of Alexandria rioted and killed many of the Christians. Cyril then expelled either all of the Jews, or else only the murderers, from Alexandria, exerting a power that belonged to the civil officer, Orestes. Orestes was unable to retaliate, but nonetheless rejected Cyril's gesture of offering him a Bible, which he may have viewed as a symbol of the religious authority of Cyril requiring Orestes' acquiescence in the bishop's policy.

The threat of conflict with Orestes induced Nitrian monks, whom Cyril may have lived amongst for five years, to come from the desert in order to defend the Patriarch. The monks accused Orestes of being a pagan. Orestes rejected the accusations, showing that he had been baptised by the Archbishop of Constantinople. However, the monks were not satisfied, and one of them, Ammonius, threw a stone and wounded Orestes in the head. Orestes' guard fled, fearing to be stoned by the monks, and the prefect was only saved when a crowd of his supporters drove away the monks and captured Ammonius. Orestes recovered from his wound and submitted Ammonius to torture in a public place. Cyril gave a funeral Mass which celebrated Ammonius as a saint and martyr, although these titles were later reversed. Both the prefect and the bishop wrote to emperor Theodosius II, telling him of their version of the events.

Orestes enjoyed the political backing of Hypatia, a philosopher whose considerable moral authority gave her extensive influence in the city of Alexandria. Her students came from rich and well-connected families, and many later attained high posts in government and the Church. Several Christians thought that Hypatia's influence had caused Orestes to reject all reconciliatory offerings by Cyril. Modern historians think that Orestes had cultivated his relationship with Hypatia to strengthen a bond with the pagan community of Alexandria, as he had done with the Jewish one, to better handle the difficult political life of the Egyptian capital.

The brutal murder of Hypatia by Cyril's followers, the Parabalani, deprived Orestes of an important and powerful supporter. This induced the Imperial Prefect to give up his struggle against Patriarch Cyril and leave Alexandria.

== Legacy ==
Ki Longfellow depicted Orestes in the 2009 historical fiction novel Flow Down Like Silver, Hypatia of Alexandria. Oscar Isaac portrayed Orestes in the 2009 film Agora, directed by Alejandro Amenábar.

== See also ==
- Cyril of Alexandria
- Hypatia

== Sources ==
- Susan Wessel, Cyril of Alexandria and the Nestorian controversy: the making of a saint and of a heretic, Oxford University Press, 2004, ISBN 0-19-926846-0.
