= Ammonius (Alexandrian monk) =

Egyptian Christian monk

Ammonius (/əˈmoʊniəs/; Greek: Ἀμμώνιος) was a Christian monk involved in the power struggle between the bishop Cyril of Alexandria and the Praefectus augustalis Orestes in the 5th century.

== Life ==
Ammonius was part of a group of supporters of the bishop Cyril, composed of both Parabalani and Nitrian monks. Whether he was a member of the Parabalani or the Nitrian monks in support of Cyril during his early reign is not made clear.

He, along with his fellow monks, confronted the Prefect riding in his open chariot in the streets of Alexandria. During the confrontation, he hurled a stone towards Orestes, which struck him in the head. The cut spilled enough blood to cover his face, nearly killing him. The monks then fled the scene from the prefect's guards and his supporters. He did not manage to flee in time and was captured by the guards and tortured to death. To show appreciation, Cyril seized his body and had his funeral at the church. During the proceedings, Cyril proclaimed him a martyr and saint and renamed him Saint Thaumasius (the Wonderful). This title was soon stripped by Cyril after fellow Christians who were embarrassed by his actions began to question this decision.

== Cultural references ==
Ammonius is portrayed by the actor Ashraf Barhom in the 2009 film Agora. In the movie, he is shown as a Parabalani monk who is a supporter of both Cyril and Theophilus before him. His confrontation with Orestes and his act of stone-throwing is portrayed in the film under different circumstances.
