= Sophie and the Rising Sun (film) =

- Directed by: Maggie Greenwald
- Screenplay by: Maggie Greenwald
- Based on: Sophie and the Rising Sun by Augusta Trobaugh
- Produced by: Nancy Dickenson; Lorraine Gallard; Brenda Goodman; Maggie Greenwald
- Starring: Julianne Nicholson; Takashi Yamaguchi; Margo Martindale; Diane Ladd; Lorraine Toussaint; Karen Wheeling Reynolds
- Cinematography: Wolfgang Held
- Edited by: Keith Reamer
- Music by: David Mansfield
- Production company: Sophie Film
- Distributed by: Monterey Media
- Release dates: January 22, 2016 (Sundance Film Festival); January 25, 2017
- Running time: 116 minutes
- Country: United States
- Language: English
- Box office: $6,763

Sophie and the Rising Sun is a 2016 American drama film written and directed by Maggie Greenwald. It is based on the 2001 novel Sophie and the Rising Sun by Augusta Trobaugh. The film stars Julianne Nicholson, Takashi Yamaguchi, Margo Martindale, Diane Ladd, Lorraine Toussaint and Karen Wheeling Reynolds. It was released in theaters on January 25, 2017 by Monterey Media.

== Plot ==
Set in the autumn of 1941 in Salty Creek, a willowy fishing village in South Carolina, the film tells the compelling story of two interracial lovers, Sophie, an artist who also fishes and sells crabs to the townsfolk, the other an Asian gentleman, swept up in the tides of history. As World War II rages in Europe, Mr. Ohta appears in the town badly beaten and under mysterious circumstances. Sophie, a native of Salty Creek, quickly becomes transfixed by Mr. Ohta and a friendship born of their mutual love of art blossoms into a delicate and forbidden courtship. As their secret relationship evolves the war escalates tragically. And when Pearl Harbor is bombed, a surge of misguided patriotism, bigotry and violence sweeps through the town, threatening Mr. Ohta's life. A trio of women, each with her own secrets – Sophie, along with the town matriarch and her housekeeper – rejects law and propriety, risking their lives with their actions.

== Cast ==
- Julianne Nicholson as Sophie Willis
- Takashi Yamaguchi as Grover Ohta
- Margo Martindale as Anne Morrison
- Diane Ladd as Ruth Jeffers
- Lorraine Toussaint as Salome Whitmore
- Karen Wheeling Reynolds as Isabel
- Mickey Dodge as Samille
- Don Henderson Baker as Dr. Gilbert
- Joel Murray as Sheriff Cooper
- David Dickson Reynolds as Reverend Jeffers
- Kenneth Charles Graham as Harold Jackson
- Sabrina Mayfield as Matilda
- Jan Hartsell as Minna
- Cali Ward as Young Sophie
- Ebony McCormick as Young Salome
- Meredith Jackson as Young Ruth
- Antonio Roberts as Zachary
- Colie McClellan as Young Anne
- Ben VanderMey as Soldier
- Harrison Shaw as Young Johnny

== Release ==
The film premiered at the 2016 Sundance Film Festival on January 22, 2016. The film was released on January 25, 2017.

=== Critical response ===
On review aggregator website Rotten Tomatoes, the film has an approval rating of 75% based on 12 reviews and an average rating of 4.5/10. As of September, 2019, There is no critical consensus yet. On Metacritic, the film has a score of 55 out of 100 based on 5 critics, indicating "mixed or average reviews".
