= Jimmy Smallhorne =

Irish filmmaker

Jimmy Smallhorne is an Irish filmmaker who wrote, directed and acted in his debut feature film 2by4. The drama about a closeted gay construction worker in New York City was nominated for the Grand Jury Prize at the 1998 Sundance Film Festival and received the Festival's Cinematography award for the camera work of Declan Quinn (Leaving Las Vegas, Vanya on 42nd Street, Kama Sutra: A Tale of Love). Smallhorne is best known for his role as Git Loughman in TV series Love/Hate.

He appeared in the crime thriller When the Sky Falls. At the 2004 Cannes Film Festival, it was announced that Smallhorne would direct his comedy screenplay Pushers Needed with an all-star cast of Joan Allen, Claire Danes, Kathy Bates, Brenda Blethyn and Maggie Smith.

Smallhorne grew up in the Ballyfermot suburb of Dublin, Ireland. He was one of eight kids and, as a teenager he became a compulsive gambler and lived rough on the streets before ending up in rehab at 18. He emigrated to the United States in 1994, finding work as a construction laborer. While working in construction, Smallhorne helped organize the Irish Bronx Theater.

In 2020 he appeared in the crime drama series Dead Still and in 2018 series Taken Down. He also appeared in the 2017 film Cardboard Gangsters.

== Filmography ==
Year	Title	Character	Notes
1998	2by4	Johnnie Maher	
2000	When the Sky Falls	Mickey O’Fagan	
2012	Love/Hate (TV series)	Git	1. Episode
2014	The Gravediggers Tour	Ambrose	Short
2014	Running Commentary	Man on Bench	Short
2015	Clean Break (TV series)	Sammy	3. Episodes
2015	The Agent	Joe	Short
2016	Éirí Amach Amú (TV series)	Gravedigger Pat	1. Episode
2017	Cardboard Gangsters	Derra Murphy	
2018	And Will	Julian	Short
2018	Taken Down (TV series)	Gar	5. Episodes
2019	Reflections	Alice's Father	Short
2019	Darklands (TV series)	Jim	6. Episodes
2020	Dead Still (TV series)	Cecil Carruthers	6. Episodes
2021	Who We Love	Fran	
2021	Gateway	Cyril	
2023	Barber	Jimmy	
2023	Return	John	Short
2023	The Doll Factory (TV series)	Priest	1. Episode
2023	Northern Lights (TV series)	Jimmy	1. Episode
2024	Twig	Joe Handles	
2024	The Dry (TV series)	Gareth	2. Episodes
2025	Irish Blood (TV Series)	Oscar Rafferty	1.Episode
