= The Long Island Incident =

- Genre: Drama
- Screenplay by: Maria Nation
- Directed by: Joseph Sargent
- Starring: Laurie Metcalf; Mackenzie Astin; Peter MacNeill; Tyrone Benskin; Elisa Moolecherry
- Theme music composer: Charles Bernstein
- Country of origin: United States
- Original language: English

Production
- Executive producers: Barbra Streisand; Cis Corman
- Producers: Robert W. Christiansen; Rick Rosenberg
- Cinematography: Edward J. Pei
- Editor: Michael Brown
- Running time: 96 minutes
- Production companies: Barwood Films; Columbia TriStar Television

Original release
- Network: NBC
- Release: May 3, 1998

The Long Island Incident is a 1998 American made-for-television drama film produced by Barbra Streisand's Barwood Films. The teleplay by Maria Nation is based on the 1993 Long Island Rail Road shooting. The film premiered on May 3, 1998 on NBC.

== Plot ==
On December 7, 1993, Jamaican émigré Colin Ferguson boarded the 5:33pm train to Hicksville at the Long Island Rail Road terminal in midtown-Manhattan and opened fire on the passengers with a 9 mm handgun soon after departure. While early scenes of the film depict his efforts to purchase the weapon, the bulk of the movie concentrates on the aftermath, particularly its impact on Mineola housewife Carolyn McCarthy, whose husband Dennis was killed and son Kevin so severely injured doctors initially gave him only a 10% chance of survival.

McCarthy's determination to rehabilitate Kevin keeps her close by his side, and initially she resists an invitation to lobby Congress to pass stronger gun control measures. When Ferguson's original attorney, William Kunstler, announces he will use "black rage" as an innovative defense in his client's mass murder trial, McCarthy becomes enraged and stirred to action. In large part due to her efforts, the Federal Assault Weapons Ban is passed in 1994.

The following year, Republicans gain a majority in Congress and attempt to repeal the law. When Congressman Dan Frisa, who represents the district in which McCarthy lives, supports the repeal, she impulsively decides to run against him in the next election. She changes her party affiliation to Democratic and, with no previous political experience and against all odds, she garners enough support from the local and national Democratic parties and the endorsement of the local daily newspaper Newsday to defeat Frisa by nearly 17%.

Joseph Sargent directed a cast that included Laurie Metcalf as Carolyn McCarthy, Mackenzie Astin as her son Kevin, Sandy Crawley as Dan Frisa, and Tyrone Benskin as Colin Ferguson. The movie was filmed in Toronto, Ontario, Canada.
