= Agora (film) =

2009 historical drama

- Film poster
- Directed by: Alejandro Amenábar
- Written by: Alejandro Amenábar; Mateo Gil
- Produced by: Fernando Bovaira; Álvaro Augustin
- Starring: Rachel Weisz; Max Minghella; Oscar Isaac
- Cinematography: Xavi Giménez
- Edited by: Nacho Ruiz Capillas
- Music by: Dario Marianelli
- Production companies: Telecinco Cinema; MOD Producciones; Himenóptero
- Distributed by: Fox International Productions (Spain; through Hispano Foxfilm S.A.E.); Focus Features International (international)
- Release date: 9 October 2009
- Running time: 126 minutes
- Country: Spain
- Language: English
- Budget: €50 million
- Box office: $39 million

Agora (Spanish: Ágora) is a 2009 English-language Spanish historical drama film directed by Alejandro Amenábar and written by Amenábar and Mateo Gil. Based on real figures from late 4th-century Roman Egypt, it stars Rachel Weisz as Hypatia, a mathematician, philosopher and astronomer surrounded by religious turmoil and social unrest. Max Minghella co-stars as Davus, Hypatia's father's slave, and Oscar Isaac as Hypatia's student, and later prefect of Egypt, Orestes.

The story uses historical fiction to highlight the relationship between religion and science at the time amidst the decline of Greco-Roman polytheism and the Christianization of the Roman Empire. The title of the film takes its name from the agora, a public gathering place in ancient Greece, similar to the Roman forum. The film was shot on the island of Malta from March to June 2008. Justin Pollard, co-author of The Rise and Fall of Alexandria (2007), was the historical adviser for the film.

Agora was included in the official selection at the 2009 Cannes Film Festival, but screened out of competition. It opened in Spain on 9 October 2009 becoming the highest-grossing film of the year for that country. Although the film had difficulty finding distribution, it was released country by country throughout late 2009 and early 2010. It received mixed reviews, with praise for its themes, ambition and Weisz's performance, but criticism towards its script. In Spain, it won seven Goya Awards, including Best Original Screenplay, and was awarded the Alfred P. Sloan Foundation Feature Film Prize at the Hamptons International Film Festival.

== Plot ==
In 391 C.E., Alexandria is part of the Roman Empire, and Greek philosopher Hypatia is a teacher at the Platonic school, where future leaders are educated. Hypatia is the daughter of Theon, the director of the Musaeum of Alexandria. Hypatia, her father's slave, Davus, and two of her pupils, Orestes and Synesius, are immersed in the changing political and social landscape. Orestes tries to woo Hypatia with music, but she rejects Orestes's love by showing him her menstrual rags, because she prefers to devote herself to science. Davus assists Hypatia in her classes and is interested in science. He is also secretly in love with her.

Meanwhile, social unrest begins challenging the Roman rule of the city as Pagans and Christians come into conflict. When the Christians start verbally insulting the statues of the pagan gods, the pagans, including Orestes and Theon, ambush the Christians. However, in the ensuing battle, the pagans unexpectedly find themselves outnumbered by a large Christian mob. Theon is gravely injured, and Hypatia and the pagans take refuge in the Library of the Serapeum. The Christian siege of the library ends when an envoy of the Roman Emperor Theodosius I declares that the pagans are pardoned, but the Christians shall be allowed to take possession of the library. Hypatia and the pagans flee while trying to save the most important scrolls before the Christians overtake the library and destroy its contents. Davus chooses to join the Christian forces. He later returns with a gladius and sexually assaults Hypatia, but he begins to sob and offers his sword to her. However, she removes his slave collar and tells him that he is free.

Several years later, Orestes, now converted to Christianity, is prefect (Roman state official serving as governor) of Egypt. Hypatia continues to investigate the motions of the Sun, the Moon, the five known "wanderers" (planets), and the stars. Some Christians ridicule the thinking that the Earth is a sphere by arguing that people far from the top would fall off the Earth. When they ask Davus what his opinion is, he avoids conflict by saying that only God knows these things.

Hypatia also investigates the heliocentric model of the Solar System proposed by Aristarchus of Samos by having an object dropped from the mast of a moving ship, which demonstrates that a possible motion of the Earth would not affect the motion, relative to Earth, of a falling object on Earth. However, due to religious objections against heliocentrism, the Christians have now forbidden Hypatia to teach at the school. The Christians and the Jews come into violent conflict.

The leader of the Christians, Cyril, views Hypatia as having too much influence over Orestes and stages a public ceremony intended to force Orestes to subjugate her. Hypatia's former pupil, Synesius, now the Bishop of Cyrene, comes to her rescue as a religious authority counterweight but says he cannot help her unless she accepts Christianity; she refuses. Hypatia theorizes that the Earth orbits around the Sun in an elliptical orbit, not a circular orbit, with the Sun at one of the foci. Cyril convinces a mob of Christians that Hypatia is a witch, and they vow to kill her. Davus tries to warn Hypatia, but she is captured. They strip Hypatia and are about to skin her alive until Davus persuades the mob otherwise, and they decide to stone her instead. When the mob goes outside to collect stones, Davus suffocates her to spare her the pain of being stoned and tells the mob that she fainted. Davus leaves as they begin to stone her.

== Cast ==
- Rachel Weisz as Hypatia of Alexandria. Weisz was already a fan of Amenábar's work when she received the script, and was very interested in the role. Although she had not heard of Hypatia before, she felt that her history was still relevant to the contemporary world: "Really, nothing has changed. I mean, we have huge technological advances and medical advances, but in terms of people killing each other in the name of God, fundamentalism still abounds. And in certain cultures, women are still second-class citizens, and they're denied education." Weisz wanted to delve more into Hypatia's sexuality and her desires, but Amenábar disagreed. She also received science lessons to help inform her depiction of the character. At the 2009 Cannes Film Festival, Weisz spoke about her style and approach: "There's no way we could know how people behave in the 4th century. I imagine they were still human beings with the same emotions as we have now. There are cultural customs, I guess, which were different. We approach the acting style to make the people flesh and blood and to make the acting incredibly naturalistic."
- Max Minghella as Davus, Hypatia's father's slave. Davus is in love with Hypatia, but it is an unrequited love, and Davus turns towards Christianity instead. When Hypatia is about to be stoned to death at the end of the film, he decides to suffocate her because he still loves her and doesn't want her to suffer any physical pain. The character of Davus was invented as "eyes for the audience" and is not based on any historical account.
- Oscar Isaac as Orestes. Student of Hypatia, Orestes is an aristocrat, who like Davus, falls in love with her, and has a strong friendship with Hypatia. Isaac was familiar with the history of early Christianity during the period represented in the film, but like Weisz, he had not heard of Hypatia before joining the project.
- Sami Samir as Saint Cyril of Alexandria
- Manuel Cauchi as Theophilus of Alexandria, uncle of Cyril
- Ashraf Barhom as Ammonius, a Parabalani monk
- Michael Lonsdale as Theon of Alexandria, father of Hypatia
- Rupert Evans as Synesius of Cyrene
- Homayoun Ershadi as Aspasius the old slave. He acts as Hypatia's research assistant.

== Production ==
=== Development ===
It's a movie that challenges the audience in terms of reasoning and trying to get into the story. I kept saying the movie is about astronomy and I wanted to express concepts that we study in school—science, mathematics—that don't show how fascinating the topic is [the way the subjects are taught in modern education]. I wanted to translate [man's] fascination with the pursuit of knowledge. I wanted to show astronomy and those who study it in the most appealing way. Those are the real heroes of the movie.

— Alejandro Amenábar

After Amenábar completed The Sea Inside (2004), he took a break and traveled to the island of Malta, where he used his free time to explore the night sky. Seeing the Milky Way galaxy, Amenábar began to discuss astronomy with his friends, speculating about extraterrestrial life on other planets. He started to research astronomy and came across Cosmos: A Personal Voyage, by American astronomer Carl Sagan. Amenábar also studied historical figures such as Ptolemy, Copernicus, Johannes Kepler and Galileo, but found himself most interested in the story of Hypatia, a 4th-century Greek astronomer whose history, he felt, was still relevant: "We realized that this particular time in the world had a lot of connections with our contemporary reality. Then the project became really, really intriguing, because we realized that we could make a movie about the past while actually making a movie about the present."

To prepare for the task of recreating the ancient city of Alexandria without relying on computer generated imagery, Amenábar reviewed older sword-and-sandal films such as The Ten Commandments (1956), Ben-Hur (1959), and Pharaoh (1966). A year before the start of pre-production, designer Guy Hendrix Dyas spent three weeks with Amenábar in Madrid to do some preliminary work on the set designs and the recreation of the ancient city of Alexandria so that previous animations could be generated.

The film was produced by Fernando Bovaira, with Telecinco Cinema as the primary producer alongside MOD Producciones and Himenóptero and it had the participation of Canal+ España.

=== Filming ===
Principal photography began on 17 March 2008, on the island of Malta, and was scheduled to last 15 weeks. The cast, including American actor Oscar Isaac, largely employed British-style accents despite the film’s setting in Roman Egypt, reflecting the longstanding convention of using British accents in historical epics.

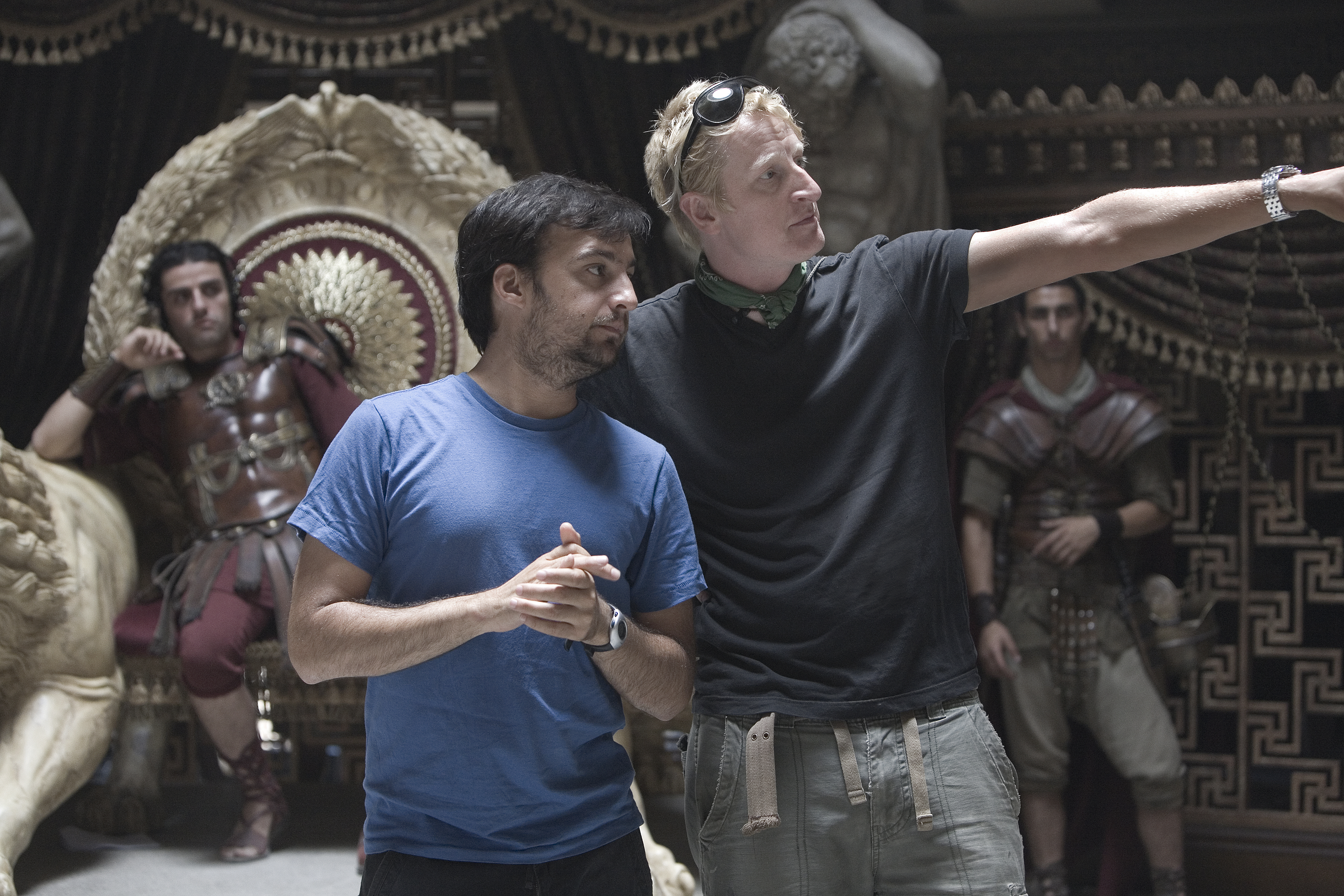
Actor Oscar Isaac, Director Alejandro Amenábar and Production Designer Guy Hendrix Dyas during filming in Malta.

Production designer Guy Hendrix Dyas used a mixture of sets and locations instead of CGI at Amenábar's direction. The construction of the set employed almost 400 people, and was the largest ever designed on the island. Actor Charles Thake (Hesiquius) suffered minor facial injuries on the set when he collided with extras running during a scene. Filming ended in June.

== Release ==
Agora premiered at the 2009 Cannes Film Festival, but the film was initially unable to find a domestic distributor due to its large budget and length. The film also had trouble finding a distributor in both the United States and Italy, although it eventually found distributors in both countries. The North America premiere was held at the Toronto International Film Festival in September 2009. Agora opened in Spain on 9 October 2009, breaking box office records for that country. A limited release in the United States began on 28 May 2010, opening on two screens at the Paris Theatre and the Sunshine Cinema in New York City. The film opened on the West Coast of the United States on 4 June, playing only two screens: at The Landmark theatre in Los Angeles and at Regal's Westpark 8 in Irvine.

=== Home media ===
In March 2010, Agora was released in Region 2-locked DVD and Blu-ray formats. A Region 1-locked DVD was released October 2010.

== Reception ==
=== Critical response ===
A visually imposing, high-minded epic that ambitiously puts one of the pivotal moments in Western history onscreen for the first time.

— Todd McCarthy, Variety

British writer and film critic Peter Bradshaw, of The Guardian, praised Alejandro Amenábar and his film, describing Agora as "an ambitious, cerebral and complex movie.... Unlike most toga movies, it doesn't rely on CGI spectacle, but real drama and ideas." Bradshaw also applauded Rachel Weisz's role as Hypatia, calling it "an outstanding performance". American screenwriter and critic Roger Ebert liked the film and gave it three stars out of four. He said: "I went to see Agora expecting an epic with swords, sandals and sex. I found swords and sandals, some unexpected opinions about sex, and a great deal more."

The film holds a 53% approval rating on Rotten Tomatoes, based on 93 reviews with an average score of 5.7/10. The website's critics' consensus reads, "Noble goals and a gripping performance from Rachel Weisz can't save Agora from its muddled script, uneven acting, and choppy editing." Metacritic, which uses a weighted average, assigned the film a score of 55 out of 100, based on 21 critics, indicating "mixed or average" reviews.

=== Response from Christians ===
Before its release, the distribution company insisted on screening the film at the Vatican. No objections were reported, and Vatican officials assisted in some of the religious depictions. According to Amenábar, "There's one scene in which Cyril reads from St. Paul and [the Vatican] tried to look for the softest version. In the English version, [it is] taken from the King James version of the Bible", from 1 Timothy 2.

The Observatorio Antidifamación Religiosa, a Spanish Catholic group, claimed that the film was responsible for "promoting hatred of Christians and reinforcing false clichés about the Catholic Church." Michael Ordoña of the Los Angeles Times acknowledges that the film has been criticized for "perceived slights against Christians" but that "its lack of condemnation of specific dogma makes the film's target seem to be fundamentalism in general".

In contrast, the New York-based Rev. Philip Grey wrote a positive review of the film:

Christians who see themselves in the fanatic, murderous monks of the film and feel offended need to do some serious soul-searching... Hypatia as depicted in the film is firmly opposed to what, in her time and at her city, is offered—or rather, imposed by brute force—under the name of 'Christianity'. Nevertheless, she seems to me far more a follower of the precepts of Christianity than are her persecutors and tormentors.... In particular, in watching the deeply moving final scene, her going calmly to her death amidst the jeering mob, I could not help but strongly recall Jesus Christ on his own way to Golgotha.

=== Box office ===
Agora was Spain's highest-grossing film of 2009, earning over $10.3 million within four days of its release on 9 October.

Based on North American theatre tracking data from Rentrak Theatrical, indieWIRE reported that Agora "scored the highest per-theater-average of any film in the marketplace" during the Memorial Day holiday weekend from 28 May through 31 May, just after its U.S. limited release. Despite this very high per-theater average, Agora was never widely released in the United States. According to Box Office Mojo, its widest release in the US was just 17 theaters.

The film grossed over $32.3 million (€21.4 million) by 1 December 2009, and about $35 million by 1 February 2010. As of 10 January 2011, Agora's worldwide box office earnings were approximately $39 million. DVD and Blu-ray sales numbers are not publicly available.

=== Accolades ===
Agora was nominated for 13 Goya Awards, winning 7. The film won the Alfred P. Sloan Foundation Feature Film Prize in 2009 at the Hamptons International Film Festival.

== Historical accuracy ==
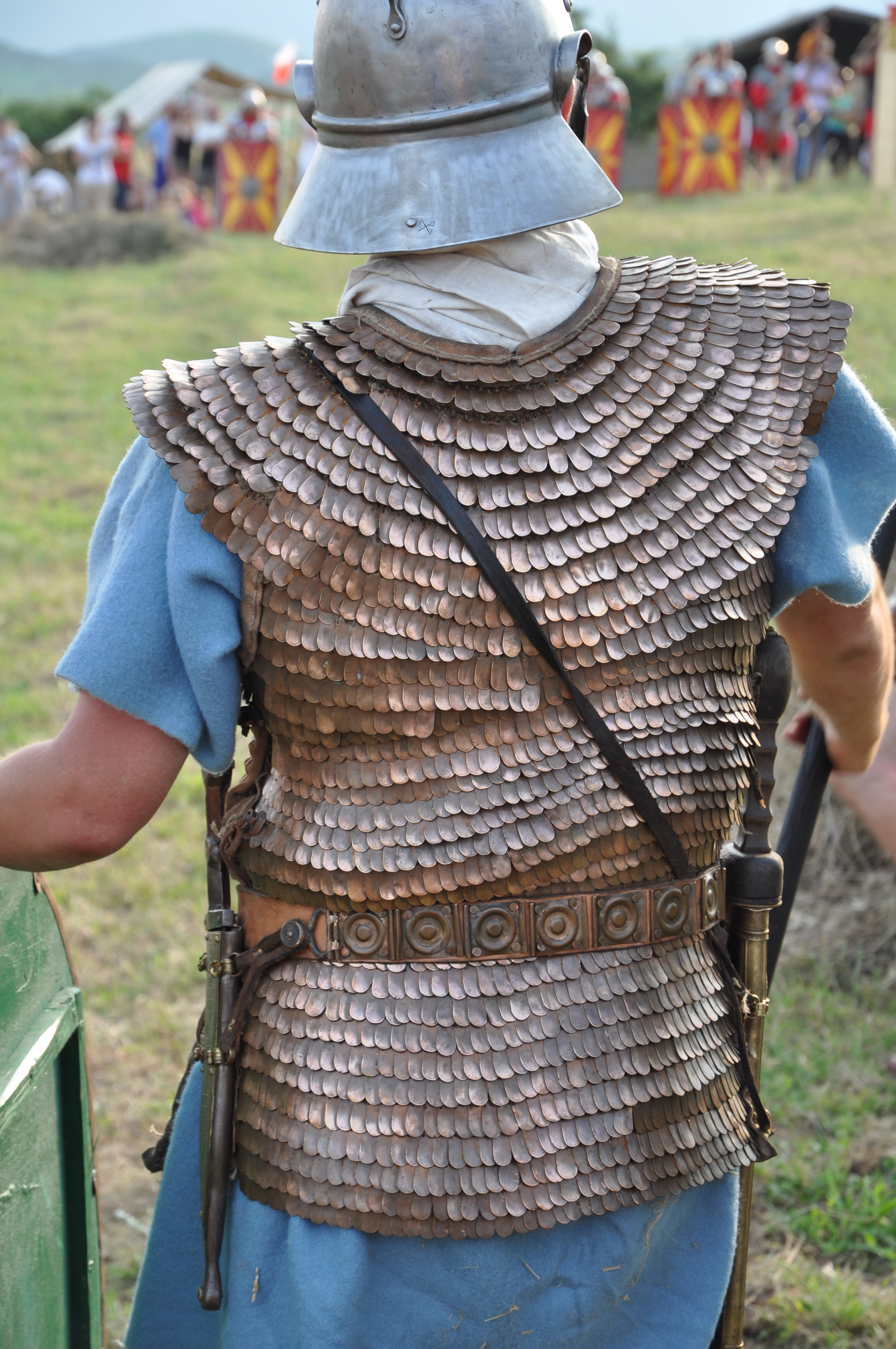
By the fifth century AD, when the film is set, Roman soldiers wore either scale armor (pictured) or chain mail, not segmented armor as they are shown wearing in the film.

The Cambridge History of Science has described the film as "spectacularly anachronistic", singling out the film's portrayal of Hypatia's fictional discovery the law of free fall and heliocentric orbits for criticism.

Antonio Mampaso, a Spanish astrophysicist and one of Agora's scientific advisors, stated in an interview that "We know that Hypatia lived in Alexandria in the IV and V centuries AD, until her death in 415. Only three primary sources mention Hypatia of Alexandria, apart from other secondary ones". He added that none of Hypatia's work has survived but it is thought, from secondary sources, that her main fields of study and work were geometry and astronomy. Mampaso dubiously claimed that Hypatia invented the hydrometer, an instrument still in use today, and that probably her father Theon of Alexandria, together with Hypatia, invented the astrolabe. However, it is generally accepted that the astrolabe had already been invented a couple of centuries earlier, and that the instrument was known to the Greeks before the Christian era. Similarly, the hydrometer was invented before Hypatia, and already known in her time. In this regard, Pappus of Alexandria was recorded as using the hydrometer before Hypatia was even born. Synesius sent Hypatia a letter describing a hydrometer, and requesting her to have one constructed for him. There is no evidence that the historical Hypatia ever studied the heliocentric model proposed by Aristarchus of Samos or that she ever found any evidence to support it. And there is no evidence that she proposed an elliptical orbit of the earth around the sun -- indeed, no data supporting elliptical orbits is known to have existed prior to the astronomical observations of Tycho Brahe (c. 1600 AD).

The set used in the film is meticulously historically authentic, showing a blend of Greek, Roman, and Egyptian architectural styles that would have been fitting to the time period, but the costumes are anachronistic. The Roman soldiers are shown wearing generic armor and weapons resembling the type used in the first century AD, but the film is actually set in the fifth century AD, by which time Roman troops no longer wore segmented armor and would have instead worn scale armor or chain mail.

The film contains conflicting information regarding the fate of the Library of Alexandria and Hypatia's life. In one scene, inspired by the final episode of Carl Sagan's Cosmos, Christian rioters, under the decree of Pope Theophilus, appear to burn the "Great Library"; however, no records of the historical Library of Alexandria existed anymore at the time Hypatia was born. The last references to anyone having held membership in the Mouseion, the larger research community associated with the Library, date to the 260s AD. Theon was the head of a school called the "mouseion", but it was probably another school named after the Hellenistic cult of the Muses. There is, however, one very brief mention in the film that the library where most of the action happens is the "daughter" library. Although the Serapeum of Alexandria did at some point house scrolls from the Great Library, it is uncertain whether there were any scrolls at the time of its destruction in 391 AD (some sources prior to that date speak of them in the past tense). In the film, Christian rioters merely knock over all the statues and burn the scrolls, whereas in reality they completely demolished the Serapeum to the ground, leaving no part of its structure intact. Agora also strongly implies that Hypatia was an atheist, although we know that she was a Neoplatonist follower of the teachings of Plotinus, who believed that the goal of philosophy was "a mystical union with the divine."

Robert Barron, an American Catholic bishop, philosopher, and theologian, writes in an article: "Hypatia was indeed a philosopher and she was indeed killed by a mob in 415, but practically everything else about the story that Gibbon and Sagan and Amenábar tell is false." Irene A. Artemi, a doctor of theology at Athens University, states: "The movie—albeit seemingly not turning against the Christian religion—is in fact portraying the Christians as fundamentalist, obscurantist, ignorant and fanatic." Similarly, atheist blogger Tim O'Neill remarks: "Over and over again, elements are added to the story that are not in the source material: the destruction of the library, the stoning of the Jews in the theatre, Cyril condemning Hypatia's teaching because she is a woman, the heliocentric 'breakthrough' and Hypatia's supposed irreligiosity." Edward J. Watts, though recognising the emotive power of the film, is critical of the film's historical distortions, such as changing philosophical insights into scientific inventions and discoveries to cater to a modern audience, fictional gender-based threats to Hypatia and visually lumping the monks together with the Taliban, that devalue Hypatia's own life and mischaracterise later centuries.

== See also ==
- Hypatia – an 1853 novel by Charles Kingsley
- List of films about mathematicians
- List of historical drama films
- List of films set in ancient Rome
- The Name of the Rose, also about destruction of classical writings
- List of Spanish films of 2009
- New Atheism
