= The Last Keepers =

- Film poster
- Directed by: Maggie Greenwald
- Screenplay by: Peter Hutchings; Christina Mengert
- Story by: Claude Dal Farra
- Produced by: Brice Dal Farra; Claude Dal Farra; Carly Hugo; Lauren Munsch; Matthew Parker
- Starring: Aidan Quinn; Virginia Madsen; Zosia Mamet; Sam Underwood; Nat Wolff; Joshua Bowman; Olympia Dukakis
- Cinematography: Wolfgang Held
- Edited by: Keith Reamer
- Music by: David Mansfield
- Production company: BCDF Pictures
- Distributed by: Vertical Entertainment
- Release date: April 25, 2013 (Newport Beach)
- Running time: 85 minutes
- Country: United States
- Language: English

The Last Keepers is a 2013 American fantasy film directed by Maggie Greenwald and starring Aidan Quinn, Virginia Madsen, Zosia Mamet and Olympia Dukakis.

== Plot ==
In the movie's prologue, a young girl with platinum blonde hair witnesses a woman being burned at the stake.

In modern times, Rhea Carver awakens from a nightmare. She is the daughter of a reclusive family of witches. Rhea is seen making a dress out of recycled plastic bags as her family practices witchcraft.

At school, she begins a rocky relationship with Oliver Sands, a classmate. As the two grow closer, Rhea begins experiencing visions of the young girl with blonde hair, and begins showing her own witchcraft abilities, including bringing a garden of squash back to life and levitating dead tree stumps.

Rhea's mother experiences a vision of Rhea laying in a pool of blood and becomes overprotective of Rhea, much to the consternation of Rhea and Rhea's grandmother. As Rhea's powers grow, she shows that she is the chosen one since she possesses all three magical traits: telekinesis, visions, and healing. They inform her of the history of the family and they are the last keepers of the ancient witchcraft tradition. They want Rhea to carry on the family tradition. When she tells them of the visions of the young girl with blonde hair, they mention a prophecy that the daughter of the one who carries all three magical traits will return balance between humans and nature.

Rhea's classmates find out she is a witch and several bullies trespass at the Carver home, setting a scarecrow on fire and killing Rhea's pet goat, using its blood to write "Witch" on the window of her car.

Upset at the life they set out for her, Rhea rebels to become "normal", rejecting her family and Oliver, and beginning a relationship with another classmate named Taylor.

During a party, Rhea rides in a car driven by a drunk Taylor. Taylor then crashes his car down a hill and into a tree. She awakens in a pool of blood, but uses her healing power to heal her injuries, and then proceeds to heal and resurrect the other people that were in the car.

Rhea returns home, reuniting with Oliver and her family, apologizing for her past actions and promising to fulfill the prophecy.

== Cast ==
- Aidan Quinn as John Carver
- Virginia Madsen as Abigail Carver
- Zosia Mamet as Rhea Carver
- Olympia Dukakis as Rosemarie Carver
- Sam Underwood as Oliver Sands
- Jee Young Han as Nika
- Nat Wolff as Simon
- Josh Bowman as Taylor

== Production ==
Filming took place in Woodstock, New York in October 2010.

== Reception ==
On Rotten Tomatoes the film has three critical reviews, two positive and one negative.
