= When the Sky Falls =

- Directed by: John Mackenzie
- Written by: Ronan Gallagher; Colum McCann; Michael Sheridan
- Starring: Joan Allen; Patrick Bergin; Liam Cunningham
- Cinematography: Seamus Deasy
- Edited by: Graham Walker
- Music by: Pól Brennan; Jimmy Smyth (additional incidental music)
- Release date: 2000
- Running time: 107 minutes
- Countries: Ireland; United Kingdom; United States
- Language: English

When the Sky Falls is a 2000 film à clef directed by John Mackenzie and starring Joan Allen. The narrative centres on a fictionalised reporter based on Veronica Guerin, who wrote about drug-related crime for the Sunday Independent, and her eventual murder.

The film received negative reviews, with criticism towards its directing, writing, script, and renaming of the characters, though Allen's performance was better received. Its lack of a better connection to Guerin's story was also widely panned. Another film based on the same story, entitled Veronica Guerin, was released in 2003, to far stronger reviews and had Cate Blanchett in the title role.

== Cast ==
- Joan Allen as Sinead Hamilton
- Patrick Bergin as Mackey
- Pete Postlethwaite as Martin Shaughnessy
- Liam Cunningham as John Cosgrove
- Karl Argue as Smokey/Teenager
- Jimmy Smallhorne as Mickey O'Fagan
- Kevin McNally as Tom Hamilton
- Fearghal Geraghty as Colum Hamilton
- Gerard Mannix Flynn as Dave Hackett
- Danny O'Carroll as Shaughnessy's son

== Production ==
When the Sky Falls was filmed in Ireland.

== See also ==
- Veronica Guerin, the 2003 film covering the same story.
