= 12 Anathemas of Saint Cyril =

Propositions made by Cyril of Alexandria

The 12 Anathemas of Saint Cyril were propositions that Cyril of Alexandria drew up in his 3rd Letter to Nestorius. Nestorius was outraged and a 'pamphlet war' began between the School of Antioch and School of Alexandria. There were mutual accusations of heresy and the result was that the two sides met at the Council of Ephesus in 431. The late arrival of the delegation from Antioch allowed Cyril to have the anathemas minuted and to see Nestorius condemned and deposed. The 12 Anathemas were the basis of the doctrinal decisions of the council.

== The text ==
Greek	English translation
Ανάθεμα Α´ Εἴ τις οὐχ ὁμολογεῖ θεὸν εἶναι κατὰ ἀλήθειαν τὸν Ἐμμανουὴλ καὶ διὰ τοῦτο θεοτόκον τὴν ἁγίαν παρθένον (γεγέννηκε γὰρ σαρκικῶς σάρκα γεγονότα τὸν ἐκ θεοῦ λόγον), ἀνάθεμα ἔστω.	Anathema 1 If anyone will not confess that the Emmanuel is very God, and that therefore the Holy Virgin is the Mother of God (Θεοτόκος), inasmuch as in the flesh she bore the Word of God made flesh [as it is written, "The Word was made flesh" (Note: John 1:14)] let him be anathema.
Ανάθεμα B´ Εἴ τις οὐχ ὁμολογεῖ σαρκὶ καθ' ὑπόστασιν ἡνῶσθαι τὸν ἐκ θεοῦ πατρὸς λόγον ἕνα τε εἶναι Χριστὸν μετὰ τῆς ἰδίας σαρκός, τὸν αὐτὸν δηλονότι θεόν τε ὁμοῦ καὶ ἄνθρωπον, ἀνάθεμα ἔστω.	Anathema 2 If anyone shall not confess that the Word of God the Father is united hypostatically to flesh, and that with that flesh of his own, he is one only Christ both God and man at the same time: let him be anathema.
Ανάθεμα Γ´ Εἴ τις ἐπὶ τοῦ ἑνὸς Χριστοῦ διαιρεῖ τὰς ὑποστάσεις μετὰ τὴν ἕνωσιν, μόνηι συνάπτων αὐτὰς συναφείαι τῆι κατὰ τὴν ἀξίαν ἢ γοῦν αὐθεντίαν ἢ δυναστείαν καὶ οὐχὶ δὴ μᾶλλον συνόδωι τῆι καθ' ἕνωσιν φυσικήν, ἀνάθεμα ἔστω.	Anathema 3 If anyone shall after the [hypostatic] union divide the hypostases in the one Christ, joining them by that connection alone, which happens according to worthiness, or even authority and power, and not rather by a coming together (συνόδῳ), which is made by natural union (ἕνωσιν φυσικὴν): let him be anathema.
Ανάθεμα Δ´ Εἴ τις προσώποις δυσὶν ἢ γοῦν ὑποστάσεσιν τάς τε ἐν τοῖς εὐαγγελικοῖς καὶ ἀποστολικοῖς συγγράμμασι διανέμει φωνὰς ἢ ἐπὶ Χριστῶι παρὰ τῶν ἁγίων λεγομένας ἢ παρ' αὐτοῦ περὶ ἑαυτοῦ καὶ τὰς μὲν ὡς ἀνθρώπωι παρὰ τὸν ἐκ θεοῦ λόγον ἰδικῶς νοουμένωι προσάπτει, τὰς δὲ ὡς θεοπρεπεῖς μόνωι τῶι ἐκ θεοῦ πατρὸς λόγωι, ἀνάθεμα ἔστω.	Anathema 4 If anyone shall divide between two persons or hypostases those expressions (φωνάς) which are contained in the Evangelical and Apostolical writings, or which have been said concerning Christ by the Saints, or by himself, and shall apply some to him as to a man separate from the Word of God, and shall apply others to the only Word of God the Father, on the ground that they are fit to be applied to God: let him be anathema.
Ανάθεμα Ε´ Εἴ τις τολμᾶι λέγειν θεοφόρον ἄνθρωπον τὸν Χριστὸν καὶ οὐχὶ δὴ μᾶλλον θεὸν εἶναι κατὰ ἀλήθειαν ὡς υἱὸν ἕνα καὶ φύσει, καθὸ γέγονε σὰρξ ὁ λόγος καὶ κεκοινώνηκε παραπλησίως ἡμῖν αἵματος καὶ σαρκός, ἀνάθεμα ἔστω.	Anathema 5 If anyone shall dare to say that the Christ is a Theophorus [that is, God-bearing] man and not rather that he is very God, as an only Son through nature, because "the Word was made flesh," and "has a share in flesh and blood as we do": (Note: Hebrews 2:14) let him be anathema.
Ανάθεμα ΣΤ´ Εἴ τις λέγει θεὸν ἢ δεσπότην εἶναι τοῦ Χριστοῦ τὸν ἐκ θεοῦ πατρὸς λόγον καὶ οὐχὶ δὴ μᾶλλον τὸν αὐτὸν ὁμολογεῖ θεόν τε ὁμοῦ καὶ ἄνθρωπον, ὡς γεγονότος σαρκὸς τοῦ λόγου κατὰ τὰς γραφάς, ἀνάθεμα ἔστω.	Anathema 6 If anyone shall dare say that the Word of God the Father is the God of Christ or the Lord of Christ, and shall not rather confess him as at the same time both God and Man, since according to the Scriptures, "The Word was made flesh": let him be anathema.
Ανάθεμα Ζ´ Εἴ τίς φησιν ὡς ἄνθρωπον ἐνηργῆσθαι παρὰ τοῦ θεοῦ λόγου τὸν Ἰησοῦν καὶ τὴν τοῦ μονογενοῦς εὐδοξίαν περιῆφθαι ὡς ἑτέρωι παρ' αὐτὸν ὑπάρχοντι, ἀνάθεμα ἔστω.	Anathema 7 If anyone shall say that Jesus as man is only energized by the Word of God, and that the glory of the Only-begotten is attributed to him as something not properly his: let him be anathema.
Ανάθεμα Η´ Εἴ τις τολμᾶι λέγειν τὸν ἀναληφθέντα ἄνθρωπον συμπροσκυνεῖσθαι δεῖν τῶι θεῶι λόγωι καὶ συνδοξάζεσθαι καὶ συγχρηματίζειν θεὸν ὡς ἕτερον ἑτέρωι žτὸ γὰρ ˉσˉυˉν ἀεὶ προστιθέμενον τοῦτο νοεῖν ἀναγκάσειŸ καὶ οὐχὶ δὴ μᾶλλον μιᾶι προσκυνήσει τιμᾶι τὸν Ἐμμανουὴλ καὶ μίαν αὐτῶι τὴν δοξολογίαν ἀνάπτει, καθὸ γέγονε σὰρξ ὁ λόγος, ἀνάθεμα ἔστω.	Anathema 8 If anyone shall dare to say that the assumed man (ἀναληφθέντα) ought to be worshipped together with God the Word, and glorified together with him, and recognised together with him as God, and yet as two different things, the one with the other (for this "Together with" is added [i.e., by the Nestorians] to convey this meaning); and shall not rather with one adoration worship the Emmanuel and pay to him one glorification, as [it is written] "The Word was made flesh:" let him be anathema.
Ανάθεμα Θ´ Εἴ τίς φησιν τὸν ἕνα κύριον Ἰησοῦν Χριστὸν δεδοξάσθαι παρὰ τοῦ πνεύματος, ὡς ἀλλοτρίαι δυνάμει τῆι δι' αὐτοῦ χρώμενον καὶ παρ' αὐτοῦ λαβόντα τὸ ἐνεργεῖν δύνασθαι κατὰ πνευμάτων ἀκαθάρτων καὶ τὸ πληροῦν εἰς ἀνθρώπους τὰς θεοσημείας, καὶ οὐχὶ δὴ μᾶλλον ἴδιον αὐτοῦ τὸ πνεῦμά φησιν, δι' οὗ καὶ ἐνήργηκε τὰς θεοσημείας, ἀνάθεμα ἔστω.	Anathema 9 If any man shall say that the one Lord Jesus Christ was glorified by the Holy Ghost, so that he used through him a power not his own and from him received power against unclean spirits and power to work miracles before men and shall not rather confess that it was his own Spirit through which he worked these divine signs; let him be anathema.
Ανάθεμα Ι´ Ἀρχιερέα καὶ ἀπόστολον τῆς ὁμολογίας ἡμῶν γεγενῆσθαι Χριστὸν ἡ θεία λέγει γραφή, προσκεκόμικε δὲ ὑπὲρ ἡμῶν ἑαυτὸν εἰς ὀσμὴν εὐωδίας τῶι θεῶι καὶ πατρί. εἴ τις τοίνυν ἀρχιερέα καὶ ἀπόστολον ἡμῶν γεγενῆσθαί φησιν οὐκ αὐτὸν τὸν ἐκ θεοῦ λόγον, ὅτε γέγονε σὰρξ καὶ καθ' ἡμᾶς ἄνθρωπος, ἀλλ' ὡς ἕτερον παρ' αὐτὸν ἰδικῶς ἄνθρωπον ἐκ γυναικός, ἢ εἴ τις λέγει καὶ ὑπὲρ ἑαυτοῦ προσενεγκεῖν αὐτὸν τὴν προσφορὰν καὶ οὐχὶ δὴ μᾶλλον ὑπὲρ μόνων ἡμῶν žοὐ γὰρ ἂν ἐδεήθη προσφορᾶς ὁ μὴ εἰδὼς ἁμαρτίανŸ, ἀνάθεμα ἔστω.	Anathema 10 Whosoever shall say that it is not the divine Word himself, when he was made flesh and had become man as we are, but another than he, a man born of a woman, (Note: Galatians 4:4) yet different from him (ἰδικῶς ἄνθρωπον), who has become our Great High Priest and Apostle; (Note: Hebrews 3:1) or if any man shall say that he offered himself in sacrifice for himself and not rather for us, (Note: Ephesians 5:2) whereas, being without sin, he had no need of offering or sacrifice: let him be anathema.
Ανάθεμα ΙΑ´ Εἴ τις οὐχ ὁμολογεῖ τὴν τοῦ κυρίου σάρκα ζωοποιὸν εἶναι καὶ ἰδίαν αὐτοῦ τοῦ ἐκ θεοῦ πατρὸς λόγου, ἀλλ' ὡς ἑτέρου τινὸς παρ' αὐτὸν συνημμένου μὲν αὐτῶι κατὰ τὴν ἀξίαν ἢ γοῦν ὡς μόνην θείαν ἐνοίκησιν ἐσχηκότος, καὶ οὐχὶ δὴ μᾶλλον ζωοποιόν, ὡς ἔφημεν, ὅτι γέγονεν ἰδία τοῦ λόγου τοῦ τὰ πάντα ζωογονεῖν ἰσχύοντος, ἀνάθεμα ἔστω.	Anathema 11 Whosoever shall not confess that the flesh of the Lord gives life (Note: John 6:51) and that it pertains to the Word of God the Father as his very own, but shall pretend that it belongs to another person who is united to him [i.e., the Word] only according to honour, and who has served as a dwelling for the divinity; and shall not rather confess, as we say, that that flesh gives life because it is that of the Word who gives life to all: let him be anathema.
Ανάθεμα ΙΒ´ Εἴ τις οὐχ ὁμολογεῖ τὸν τοῦ θεοῦ λόγον παθόντα σαρκὶ καὶ ἐσταυρωμένον σαρκὶ καὶ θανάτου γευσάμενον σαρκὶ γεγονότα τε πρωτότοκον ἐκ τῶν νεκρῶν, καθὸ ζωή τέ ἐστι καὶ ζωοποιὸς ὡς θεός, ἀνάθεμα ἔστω.	Anathema 12 Whosoever shall not recognize that the Word of God suffered in the flesh, (Note: 1 Peter 4:1) that he was crucified in the flesh, and that likewise in that same flesh he tasted death (Note: Hebrews 2:9) and that he has become the first-begotten of the dead, (Note: Revelation 1:5, Colossians 1:18) for, as he is God, he is the life and it is he that gives life: let him be anathema.
