= Richard Corman (photographer) =

American photographer

- Born: 1954 (age 71–72); New York City
- Education: Hunter College
- Occupation: Photographer
- Years active: 1981–present
- Mother: Cis Corman
- Website: richardcorman.com

Richard Corman (born 1954) is an American photographer, best known for his work as a portrait photographer. His subjects include musicians, actors, athletes, artists, writers and humanitarians. His 2013 book, Madonna NYC 83, is a collection of photos he took of a pre-fame Madonna in 1983.

== Early life and education ==
Corman was born and raised in New York City. For his high school years, Corman attended boarding school at Berwick Academy (Maine). After graduating from Hunter College with a degree in art history and psychology, he initially planned on having a career in psychology, before turning to photography. He started out shooting film with a Rolleiflex camera, before ultimately moving on to digital cameras.

== Career ==
=== Madonna NYC 83 ===
In May 1983, Corman, then 29, had just finished a two-year apprenticeship with photographer Richard Avedon. Corman's mother, Cis Corman, was working as a casting director on the Martin Scorsese film The Last Temptation of Christ. Madonna, then 24, auditioned for the role of the Mary Magdalene, and although she did not get the part, Corman's mother suggested that he photographer her. Soon after, Corman took candid photographs of Madonna in and around her apartment in Manhattan's Lower East Side. This was prior to the release of her first album. In the photos, Madonna is dressed in a street fashion of ripped denim, lace and layered jewelry, with a bare midriff. Over the course of 1983, Corman had six shoots with Madonna.

30 years later, in 2013, the resulting photos were published in a coffee table book, Madonna NYC 83. In November 2013, the photos were exhibited for the first time at Milk Gallery in Manhattan, and then at LabArtGalleryLA in Los Angeles, California, in 2014. The photos were also on display in Madonna: A Transformational Exhibition, a traveling global multimedia tour sponsored by the W Hotel. The installation presented the Madonna photos by Corman alongside Alec Monopoly's graffiti art.

=== Athletes and Special Olympics ===
Corman's first collection, Glory: Photographs of Athletes, was published in 1999. The black-and-white photos include portraits of Muhammad Ali, Michael Jordan, Tiger Woods, Kareem Abdul-Jabbar, Cal Ripken Jr., and Pat Riley, along with portraits of Special Olympics athletes, ballet dancers, skateboarders and bike messengers.

Since 1991, Corman has documented intellectually disabled athletes in the Special Olympics all over the world, including Cape Town, South Africa in 2001, and Beijing, China in 2007. In 2003, these photos were collected in a book, I Am Proud: The Athletes of Special Olympics. He is creating a campaign for the 2015 Los Angeles Special Olympics Summer World Games in collaboration with artist Mr. Brainwash.

=== Other portraits and shoots ===
Corman has taken portraits of a breadth of subjects, including Bill Clinton, Robert De Niro, Paul Newman, Al Pacino, Martin Scorsese, Muhammad Ali, Kurt Vonnegut, Jean-Michel Basquiat, Isamu Noguchi, Ralph Lauren, James Dewey Watson and Elie Wiesel. In Manhattan in the early 1980s, Corman took portraits of musicians Boy George and Johnny Rotten, and artists Basquiat and Keith Haring, before they were famous. In 2001, while in Cape Town, Corman photographed President Nelson Mandela visiting his old jail cell. He photographed Philip Seymour Hoffman in character as Truman Capote for the 2005 film Capote, in the style that Richard Avedon shot Capote in the 1960s, which became the image used for the film's poster.

Corman's photos have appeared in a variety of magazines, including Vanity Fair, Vogue, Sports Illustrated, Architectural Digest and Men's Health. He shot Talking Heads for a January 1987 Rolling Stone cover story.

In May 2014, someone placed a Mason & Hamlin baby grand piano underneath the Brooklyn Bridge, and Corman photographed it, using it as a prop for shoots, including a series of images with ballerina Misty Copeland. The piano's appearance under the bridge inspired his 2014 Sunrise Under the Brooklyn Bridge series.

== Personal life ==
Corman lives in Manhattan with his wife and son.

== Bibliography ==
=== Books ===
- Glory: Photographs of Athletes (William Morrow & Co., 1999)
- I Am Proud: The Athletes of Special Olympics (Barnes & Noble, 2003)
- Prep: The Spirit of a High School Football Team (powerHouse Books, 2008) – foreword by Joe Paterno, introduction by Rich Hansen
- Madonna NYC 83 (Damiani, 2013)
- Misty Copeland Power and Grace (Michael Friedman Group, 2015)

=== Film ===
- Richard Corman: A Documentary (dir. Daniel A. Erdman, 2014)
