= Takashi Yamaguchi (actor, born 1974) =

Japanese actor (born 1974)

- 山口 貴史
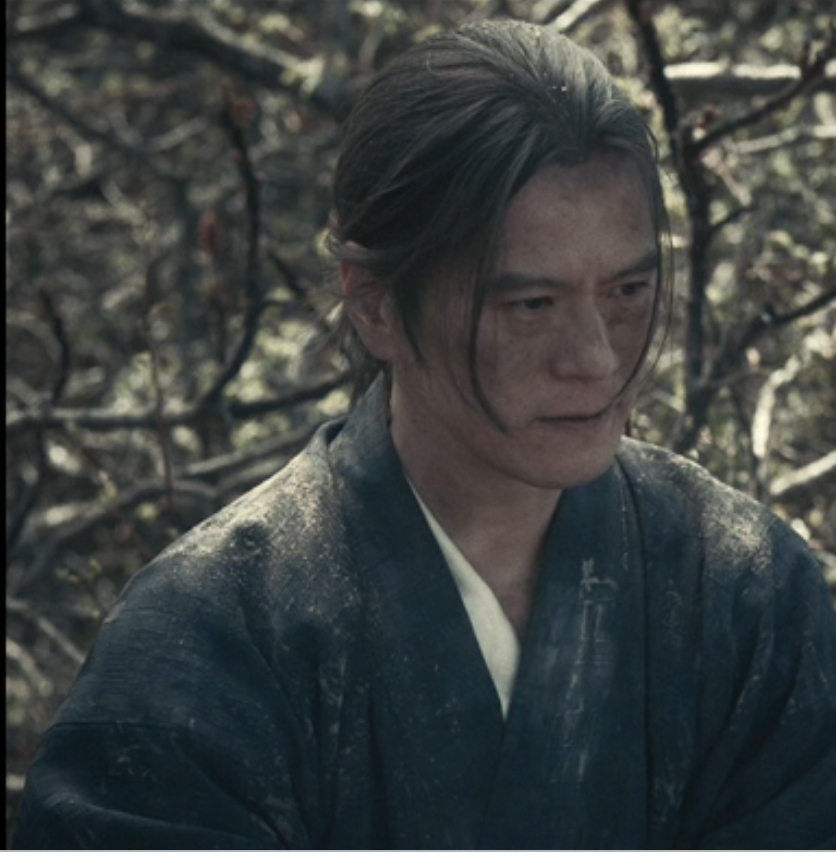
- Born: 山口 貴史; 1974 (age 51–52); Japan
- Occupation: Actor
- Height: 1.80 m (5 ft 11 in)

Takashi Yamaguchi (山口 貴史, Takashi Yamaguchi) (born 山口 貴史 (Takashi Yamaguchi); 1974) is a Japanese actor known for his work primarily in the United States, particularly in Los Angeles and Japan. He is known for his roles in the 2016 film Sophie and the Rising Sun as Grover Ohta, the love interest of the protagonist portrayed by Julianne Nicholson, and in the Apple TV+ original drama series Pachinko as Yakuza (Ryoichi).

Takashi Yamaguchi (山口 崇) is a Japanese actor born in 1936. He should not be confused with Takashi Yamaguchi (山口 隆), a Japanese architect born in 1953. Despite sharing the same name, they are different individuals with different kanji spellings.

== Filmography ==
Year	Title	Role	Category	Notes
1999	Shenmue	Additional Voices (voice)	Video Game	
2006	Letters from Iwo Jima	Kashiwara	Film	
2009	The 8th Samurai	Hori-chan	Short	
2015	Fukai Mori	Young Man	Short Film	
2016	Sophie and the Rising Sun	Grover Ohta	Film	Main Cast
2016	Criminal Minds: Beyond Borders	Yukio	TV Series	1 episode
2019	Enemy Within	Yoshio Harada	Film	
2021	Color Box	Korean Vendor	Film	
2022	Pachinko	Ryoichi	TV Series	Season 1 Episode 7
2023	Accused	Sam Tamura	TV Series	Season 1 Episode 8 :"Jiro's Story"
