= The Kill-Off =

1990 film by Maggie Greenwald

- Video Cover
- Directed by: Maggie Greenwald
- Screenplay by: Maggie Greenwald
- Based on: The Kill-Off by Jim Thompson
- Produced by: Lydia Dean Pilcher
- Starring: Cathy Haase; Loretta Gross; Andrew Lee Barrett
- Cinematography: Declan Quinn
- Edited by: James Y. Kwei
- Music by: Evan Lurie
- Production company: Filmworld International Productions
- Distributed by: Cabriolet Films
- Release dates: May 17, 1989 (Cannes Film Market); October 19, 1990 (New York City)
- Running time: 110 minutes
- Country: United States
- Language: English

The Kill-Off is a 1989 American crime drama film written and directed by Maggie Greenwald, based on a 1957 novel of the same name by Jim Thompson. It was an independent film, produced by Lydia Dean Pilcher and shot by Declan Quinn in his film debut.

== Plot ==
In a small coastal community in New Jersey, the only action in town is a nightclub called The Pavilion. The owner, Pete, can barely make the payroll so in an effort to bring in more business, he hires a sultry stripper named Danny Lee.

Danny Lee's act soon turns the head of Ralph, which is not good news for his bed-ridden wife Luane. Luane's nasty talent is her gift for gossip, and when she begins to suspect that Ralph has adultery on his mind, she starts spreading more ugly rumors that have just enough basis in fact to stick. Soon things spin out of control and a wave of violence begins.

== Cast ==
- Loretta Gross as Luane
- Andrew Lee Barrett as Bobbie Ashton
- Jackson Sims as Pete Pavlov
- Steve Monroe as Ralph
- Cathy Haase as Danny Lee
- William Russell as Rags
- Jorja Fox as Myra Pavlov
- Sean O'Sullivan as The Doctor
- Ellen Kelly as Lily Williams
- Ralph Graff as Henry Williams

== Production ==
The Kill-Off was a part of the so-called Jim Thompson revival in the late 1980s and early 1990s. The other Jim Thompson novels to be adapted into films were The Grifters and After Dark, My Sweet. The Kill Off's US release would arrive in the same year as the aforementioned films.

Director of photography Declan Quinn shot the film with low lighting; at times, footage of characters more than a few feet from the camera can be difficult to see. This was done to mirror the stylistic photography of the film noirs of the 1940s and 1950s.

Filming took place over a twenty-one-day schedule in January 1989 on a budget of less than $1 million. Exterior shots were filmed in the New Jersey seaside town of Keansburg, where the Keansburg Amusement Park can be seen in the background. Interior scenes were filmed on sets in New York.

== Release ==
The producers used the following tagline when marketing the film:

The closer you look, the less you want to know.

The film premiered at the Cannes Film Market on May 17, 1989. It went on to screen at the Women in Film Festival and the Toronto Festival of Festivals that year. Later, it was shown at the 1990 Sundance Film Festival and Maggie Greenwald was nominated for the Dramatic Grand Jury Prize. In the UK, the film opened at the Screen on the Hill in London on February 9, 1990, grossing $8,775 in its opening week. The film was given a limited theatrical release by Cabriolet Films beginning on October 19, 1990 in New York City. It also opened in Los Angeles for a week on December 14, 1990 in order to qualify for Academy Awards consideration.

=== Home media ===
The film was not released onto videocassette in the United States until 1996, when Xenon Entertainment released it onto VHS. In 2014, Films Around the World released the film on a manufactured on demand DVD-R.

== Reception ==
=== Critical response ===
Critic Peter Travers, writing for Rolling Stone, called the film "a daring, down-and-dirty thriller." In the Austin Chronicle, critic Marjorie Baumgarten reviewed the film positively, writing the "protagonists and pernicious moral rot are well-captured in Greenwald's film version of The Kill-Off. The milieu is compellingly perverse, and Greenwald and the actors get the seedy tone just right." Critic Dennis Schwartz felt though the film "wasn’t psychologically deep, nor was it morally arresting", it succeeds at "showing a feeling of deep noir malaise", noting "It’s rare that a woman directs a noir film and especially one as hard-boiled as this one."

The New York Times was less impressed with the film. Critic Caryn James wrote, "[Thompson's lurid drama] is tossed away by Ms. Greenwald's flaccid script and scenes so badly paced that the actors seem to be holding their breath between lines, waiting for their next cues."

=== Accolades ===
Wins

- Torino Film Festival: Jury Special Prize, Maggie Greenwald; 1989.

Nominations

- Deauville Film Festival, France: Critics Award, Maggie Greenwald, 1989.
- Sundance Film Festival: Dramatic Grand Jury Prize, Maggie Greenwald; 1990.

== Differences from novel ==
In the book, the author never reveals the identity of the murderer, in contrast to the film. The film also spares one of the characters that the book does not, and turns the character into a moral center.
