= Cis Corman =

American casting director (1926–2020)

- Cis Corman, from a 1946 newspaper.
- Born: Eleanor Tobe Cohen; May 12, 1926; Chelsea, Massachusetts
- Died: April 27, 2020 (aged 93); New York City
- Occupation(s): Casting director, film producer
- Children: Richard Corman (photographer)
- Relatives: Cid Corman (brother-in-law)

Cis Corman (May 12, 1926 – April 27, 2020), born Eleanor Tobe Cohen, was an American casting director and film producer. She worked closely with Barbra Streisand and Martin Scorsese during her long career.

== Early life ==
Eleanor Tobe Cohen was born in Chelsea, Massachusetts and raised in Brookline, Massachusetts, the daughter of Mr. and Mrs. Albert A. Cohen. Her family was Jewish. She graduated from Green Mountain College.

== Career ==
Corman was a mother of four, taking an acting class, when she met and encouraged a teenaged fellow student, Barbra Streisand. She later appeared with Streisand in Funny Girl (1968), worked as casting director on Streisand's Yentl (1983), and became president of Streisand's Barwood Films in 1984. She held producer credits on Nuts (1987), The Prince of Tides (1991), Serving in Silence: The Margarethe Cammermeyer Story (1995), The Mirror Has Two Faces (1996), Rescuers: Stories of Courage: Two Women (1998), The Long Island Incident (1998), Varian's War (2001), What Makes a Family (2001), and Reel Models: The First Women of Film (2001).

Corman was also casting director on other films, including Death Wish (1974), The Deer Hunter (1978), The Eyes of Laura Mars (1978), Raging Bull (1980), Heaven's Gate (1980), The King of Comedy (1982), Once Upon a Time in America (1984), and The Last Temptation of Christ (1988).

Corman won a Peabody Award and was nominated for an Emmy Award and a Golden Globe Award in 1995, for Serving in Silence.

== Personal life ==
Eleanor Tobe Cohen married Harvey Harold Corman, a psychiatrist, in 1946. They had four children, including photographer Richard Corman. Her husband died in 2001. She died in 2020, aged 93, at her home in New York City. Her brother-in-law was poet and translator Cid Corman.
