= Alfred P. Sloan Foundation Feature Film Prize =

The Alfred P. Sloan Foundation Feature Film Prize award of $25,000.00 USD was granted annually at the Hamptons International Film Festival from 2000 to 2014 by the Alfred P. Sloan Foundation.

| Year | Film | Director |
|---|---|---|
| 2014 | The Imitation Game | Morten Tyldum |
| 2013 | Decoding Annie Parker | Steven Bernstein |
| 2012 | Future Weather | Jenny Deller |
| 2011 | Small, Beautifully Moving Parts | Annie J. Howell and Lisa Robinson |
| 2010 | Beneath Hill 60 | Jeremy Sim |
| 2009 | Agora | Alejandro Amenábar |
| 2008 | Flash of Genius | Marc Abraham |
| 2007 | The Diving Bell and the Butterfly | Julian Schnabel |
| 2006 | The Fountain | Darren Aronofsky |
| 2005 | Kardia | Su Rynard |
| 2004 | Madness and Genius | Ryan Eslinger |
| 2003 | Kinsey | Bill Condon |
| 2002 | Teknolust | Lynn Hershman |
| 2001 | Enigma | Michael Apted |
| 2000 | Songcatcher | Maggie Greenwald |
