= 2by4 =

- French DVD cover
- Directed by: Jimmy Smallhorne
- Written by: Jimmy Smallhorne; Terry McGoff; Fergus Tighe
- Produced by: Virginia Biddle; John Hall
- Starring: Jimmy Smallhorne
- Cinematography: Declan Quinn
- Edited by: Scott Balcerek; Laure Sullivan
- Music by: Nigel Clark; Jerome Di Pietro
- Release dates: January 16, 1998 (Sundance); November 26, 1999 (New York)
- Running time: 90 minutes
- Country: United States
- Language: English

2by4 or 2 x 4 (Two by Four) is a 1998 American drama film directed by and starring Jimmy Smallhorne. The semi-autobiographical screenplay, co-written by Smallhorne along with Terry McGoff and Fergus Tighe, focuses on the bisexual foreman of a New York City construction crew.

At the January 1998 Sundance Film Festival, the film was nominated for the Grand Jury Prize and Declan Quinn won the Cinematography Award. It was released in New York City on November 26, 1999.

== Plot ==
Johnnie Maher is under a lot of pressure. Recently emigrated from Ireland to The Bronx, he sleepwalks and experiences nightmares. Try as he might, he can not identify the cause of his torment or make sense of the fleeting remains of his dreams. He shrugs them off, but things seem to be getting worse. Johnnie works as foreman on his uncle Trump's construction crew. Work tensions run high as the building owners complain about the cost and pace, while the workers constantly find their pay-packets shorted. Sly as a fox, Uncle Trump always explains everything away. Even when arrested for indecent exposure in a park frequented by gay men on the prowl for sex, he handily swears he only stopped there to relieve himself and was arrested by mistake. Openly bisexual, Johnnie's pressures mount when his girlfriend, Maria, and a sex-partner, Christian, begin to pressure him for more commitment. He fumbles his responses, and no one is satisfied. Finally, Johnnie catches his Uncle Trump in an act that fractures the dam of memories, and in a short time, they come flooding back into Johnnie's consciousness. Although shaken to his core, Johnnie finds the answers he needs. Most importantly, he survives the flood and can finally move forward.

== Cast ==
- Jimmy Smallhorne as Johnnie Maher
- Chris O'Neill as Uncle Trump
- Bradley Fitts as Christian
- Holyoke Joe as Joe
- Terry McGoff as Billy
- Michael Liebman as Eddie
- Ronan Carr as Brains
- Leo Hamill as Paddy
- Seamus McDonagh as Conor
- Kimberly Topper as Maria

== Critical reception ==
Anita Gates of The New York Times called the film "an interesting and adeptly made drama" but thought "its message is unclear."

Although Glenn Lovell of Variety called the film a "bracing, beautifully shot upstart drama," he observed, "It's a safe bet ... [it] won't win over the Far and Away date crowd."
