= What Makes a Family =

2001 American TV program

- Film poster
- Genre: Drama
- Written by: Robert L. Freedman
- Directed by: Maggie Greenwald
- Starring: Brooke Shields; Cherry Jones; Anne Meara; Al Waxman; Whoopi Goldberg
- Music by: David Mansfield
- Country of origin: United States
- Original language: English

Production
- Executive producers: Barbra Streisand; Cis Corman; Craig Zadan; Neil Meron; Whoopi Goldberg
- Producer: Wendy Grean
- Production location: Toronto
- Cinematography: Rhett Morita
- Editor: Keith Reamer
- Running time: 120 minutes
- Production companies: Barwood Films; Columbia TriStar Television; Storyline Entertainment; Whoop Inc.

Original release
- Network: Lifetime
- Release: January 22, 2001

What Makes a Family is a 2001 American drama television film directed by Maggie Greenwald, written by Robert L. Freedman, and starring Brooke Shields, Cherry Jones, Anne Meara, Al Waxman, and Whoopi Goldberg. The film premiered on Lifetime on January 22, 2001.

== Plot ==
Based on a true story, the film involves a lesbian couple living in Florida who choose to have a child. Janine Nielsen and her partner, Sandy Cataldi, elect to conceive a baby via artificial insemination with Sandy as the biological mother. After the birth of their daughter Heather, Sandy is diagnosed with systemic lupus when she collapses at the baby's christening. The couple handles the disease for several years until Sandy dies. Following her death, Sandy's parents sue to gain custody of the child. Addressing moral, legal and ethical issues, Janine's lawyer, Terry Harrison, wins the custody battle after a video tape surfaces in which Sandy expressed her love for both Janine and Heather and her wish for them to stay together.

== Cast ==
- Brooke Shields as Janine Nielssen
- Cherry Jones as Sandy Cataldi
- Anne Meara as Evelyn Cataldi
- Al Waxman as Frank Cataldi
- Whoopi Goldberg as Terry Harrison
- Jordy Benattar as Heather Cataldi
- Melanie Nicholls-King as Nora
- Dean McDermott as O'Brien
- Sean McCann as Judge Black
- Jayne Eastwood as Judge Shales

== Production ==
The film was directed by Maggie Greenwald and written by Robert L. Freedman. The executive producers were Barbra Streisand, Whoopi Goldberg, Cis Corman, Craig Zadan and Neil Meron. Filming took place in Toronto.

== Reception ==
Ron Wertheimer of The New York Times praised several aspects of movie and stated: "Dripping with good intentions but enriched by performances of genuine depth, What Makes a Family, tonight on Lifetime, rises several notches above the usual based-on-a-true-story television movie." Andy Webb of The Movie Scene gave the film three out of five stars, concluding: "What this all boils down to is that "What Makes a Family" was not the movie I expected and in some ways a far better one. Instead of being the legal drama about rights what you get is this pleasant drama about being a family and it works."

What Makes a Family won one GLAAD Media Award in the category of "Outstanding Television Movie". The film was also nominated for one Humanitas Prize in the category of "90 Minute or Longer Cable Category".
