= Cyril of Alexandria =

Patriarch of Alexandria from 412 to 444

Saint Cyril of Alexandria
- Patriarch of Alexandria; Doctor of the Church; Pillar of Faith
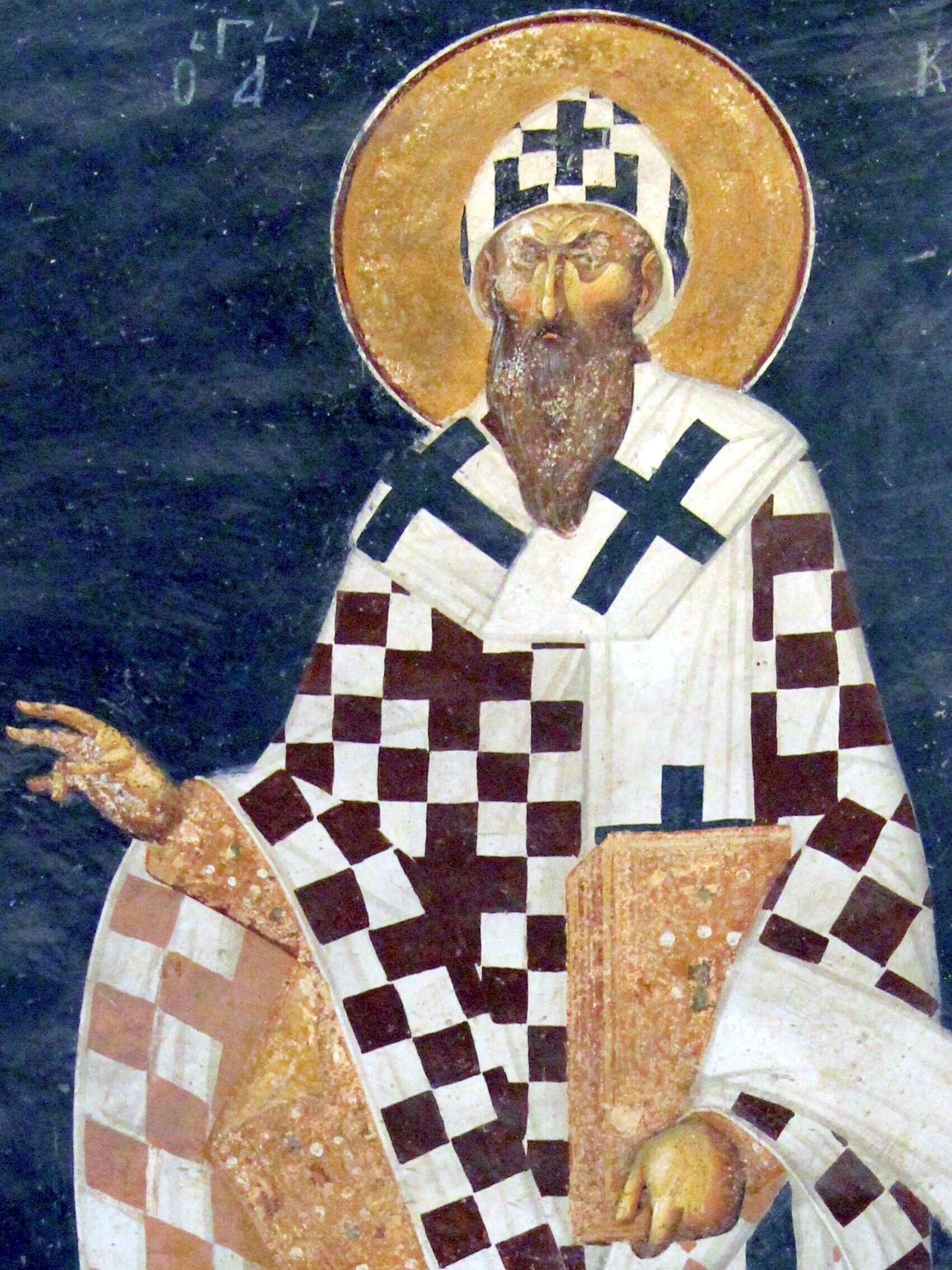
- Fresco in the Chora, 14th century
- Archdiocese: Alexandria
- See: Alexandria
- Predecessor: Theophilus of Alexandria
- Successor: Pope Dioscorus I of Alexandria

Personal details
- Born: c. 376 Didouseya, Province of Egypt, Byzantine Empire
- Died: 444 (aged 67–68) Alexandria, Province of Egypt, Byzantine Empire

Sainthood
- Feast day: 18 January and 9 June (Eastern Orthodox Church); 27 June (Coptic Church, Catholic Church, Lutheranism); 9 February (formerly: Catholic Church, 1882–1969); 27 June (Church of England in Common Worship); 28 January (Western Rite Orthodoxy)
- Venerated in: Catholic Church; Eastern Orthodox Church; Oriental Orthodox Church; Anglicanism; Lutheranism
- Title as Saint: The Pillar of Faith; Seal of all the Fathers; Bishop, Confessor, Bishop of Alexandria, Teacher of the Faith and also (in the Catholic Church) Doctor of the Church
- Attributes: Vested as a bishop with phelonion and omophorion, and usually with his head covered in the manner of Egyptian monastics (sometimes the head covering has a polystavrion pattern), he usually is depicted holding a Gospel Book or a scroll, with his right hand raised in blessing.
- Patronage: Alexandria

Cyril of Alexandria (Ancient Greek: Κύριλλος Ἀλεξανδρείας; Coptic: Ⲡⲁⲡⲁ Ⲕⲩⲣⲓⲗⲗⲟⲩ ⲁ̅ or Coptic: Ⲡⲓⲁⲅⲓⲟⲥ Ⲁⲃⲃⲁ Ⲕⲩⲣⲓⲗⲗⲟⲥ ⲡⲓⲥⲧⲩⲗⲗⲟⲥ ⲛ̀ⲧⲉ ⲡⲓⲛⲁϩϯ or ⲡⲓ̀ⲁⲅⲓⲟⲥ Ⲕⲓⲣⲓⲗⲗⲟⲥ; c. 376–444) was an Egyptian Christian theologian and Patriarch of Alexandria from 412 to 444.

Cyril wrote extensively and was a major player in the Christological controversies of the late 4th and 5th centuries. He was the President of the Council of Ephesus in 431, which clarified the hypostatic union of Christ's divine and human natures into one person against the views of Nestorius, who was deposed as Patriarch of Constantinople. He is also well-known for his advocacy of the term Theotokos for the Virgin Mary, which followed from his Christological views.

Cyril is venerated as a saint in the Catholic and Orthodox Churches with the titles Pillar of Faith and Seal of the Fathers. In the Catholic Church, he was named a Doctor of the Church by Pope Leo XIII in 1883 under the title Doctor Incarnationis ("Doctor of the Incarnation").

== Early life ==
Little is known for certain of Cyril's early life. He was born circa 376, in the town of Didouseya, Egypt, modern-day El-Mahalla El-Kubra. A few years after his birth, his maternal uncle Theophilus rose to the powerful position of Patriarch of Alexandria. His mother remained close to her brother and under his guidance, Cyril was well educated. His writings show his knowledge of Christian writers of his day, including Eusebius, Origen, Didymus the Blind, and writers of the Church of Alexandria. He received the formal Christian education standard for his day: he studied grammar from age twelve to fourteen (390–392), rhetoric and humanities from fifteen to twenty (393–397) and finally theology and biblical studies (398–402).

In 403, he accompanied his uncle to attend the "Synod of the Oak" in Constantinople, which deposed John Chrysostom as Archbishop of Constantinople. The prior year, Theophilus had been summoned by the emperor to Constantinople to apologize before a synod, over which Chrysostom would preside, on account of several charges which were brought against him by certain Egyptian monks. Theophilus had them persecuted as Origenists. Placing himself at the head of soldiers and armed servants, Theophilus had marched against the monks, burned their dwellings, and ill-treated those whom he captured. Theophilus arrived at Constantinople with twenty-nine of his suffragan bishops, and conferring with those opposed to the Archbishop, drafted a long list of largely unfounded accusations against Chrysostom, who refused to recognize the legality of a synod in which his open enemies were judges. Chrysostom was subsequently deposed.

=== Patriarch of Alexandria ===
Theophilus died on 15 October 412, and Cyril was made Pope or Patriarch of Alexandria on 18 October 412, but only after a riot between his supporters and those of his rival Archdeacon Timotheus. According to Socrates Scholasticus, the Alexandrians were always rioting.

Thus, Cyril followed his uncle in a position that had become powerful and influential, rivalling that of the prefect in a time of turmoil and frequently violent conflict between the cosmopolitan city's pagan, Jewish, and Christian inhabitants. He began to exert his authority by causing the churches of the Novatianists to be closed and their sacred vessels to be seized.

== Controversies ==
=== Dispute with the Prefect ===
Orestes, Praefectus augustalis of the Diocese of Egypt, steadfastly resisted Cyril's ecclesiastical encroachment upon secular prerogatives.

Tension between the parties increased when in 415, Orestes published an edict that outlined new regulations regarding mime shows and dancing exhibitions in the city, which attracted large crowds and were commonly prone to civil disorder of varying degrees. Crowds gathered to read the edict shortly after it was posted in the city's theater. Cyril sent the grammaticus Hierax to discover the content of the edict. The edict angered Christians as well as Jews. At one such gathering, Hierax read the edict and applauded the new regulations, prompting a disturbance. Many people felt that Hierax was attempting to incite the crowd—particularly the Jews—into sedition. Orestes had Hierax tortured in public in a theatre. This order had two aims: one to quell the riot, the other to mark Orestes' authority over Cyril.

Socrates Scholasticus recounts that upon hearing of Hierax's severe and public punishment, Cyril threatened to retaliate against the Jews of Alexandria with "the utmost severities" if the harassment of Christians did not cease immediately. In response to Cyril's threat, the Jews of Alexandria grew even more furious, eventually resorting to violence against the Christians. They plotted to flush the Christians out at night by running through the streets claiming that the Church of Alexander was on fire. When Christians responded to what they were led to believe was the burning down of their church, "the Jews immediately fell upon and slew them" by using rings to recognize one another in the dark and killing everyone else in sight. When the morning came, Cyril, along with many of his followers, took to the city's synagogues in search of the perpetrators of the massacre.

According to Socrates, after Cyril rounded up all the Jews in Alexandria he ordered them to be stripped of all possessions, banished them from Alexandria, and allowed their goods to be pillaged by the remaining citizens of Alexandria. Scholasticus alleges that all the Jews of Alexandria were banished, while John of Nikiû says it was only those involved in the ambush and massacre.

Nonetheless, with Cyril's banishment of the Jews, however many, "Orestes [...] was filled with great indignation at these transactions, and was excessively grieved that a city of such magnitude should have been suddenly bereft of so large a portion of its population." Because of this, the feud between Cyril and Orestes intensified, and both men wrote to the emperor regarding the situation. Eventually, Cyril attempted to reach out to Orestes through several peace overtures, including attempted mediation and, when that failed, showed him the Gospels, which he interpreted to indicate that the religious authority of Cyril would require Orestes' acquiescence in the bishop's policy. Nevertheless, Orestes remained unmoved by such gestures.

This refusal almost cost Orestes his life. Nitrian monks came from the desert and instigated a riot against Orestes among the population of Alexandria. These monks had resorted to violence 15 years before, during a controversy between Theophilus (Cyril's uncle) and the "Tall Brothers"; the monks assaulted Orestes and accused him of being a pagan. Orestes rejected the accusations, showing that he had been baptised by the Archbishop of Constantinople. A monk named Ammonius threw a stone hitting Orestes in the head. The prefect had Ammonius tortured to death, whereupon the Patriarch allegedly honored him as a martyr. However, at least according to Scholasticus, the Christian community displayed a general lack of enthusiasm for Ammonius's case for martyrdom. The prefect then wrote to the emperor Theodosius II, as did Cyril.

=== Murder of Hypatia ===
The Prefect Orestes enjoyed the political backing of Hypatia, an astronomer, philosopher and mathematician who had considerable moral authority in the city of Alexandria, and who had extensive influence. Indeed, many students from wealthy and influential families came to Alexandria purposely to study privately with Hypatia, and many of these later attained high posts in government and the Church. Several Christians thought that Hypatia's influence had caused Orestes to reject all conciliatory offerings by Cyril. Modern historians think that Orestes had cultivated his relationship with Hypatia to strengthen a bond with the pagan community of Alexandria, as he had done with the Jewish one, in order to better manage the tumultuous political life of the Egyptian capital.

According to Socrates Scholasticus during the Christian season of Lent in March 415, a mob of Christians under the leadership of a lector named Peter, raided Hypatia's carriage as she was travelling home. They dragged her into a building known as the Kaisarion, a former pagan temple and center of the Roman imperial cult in Alexandria that had been converted into a Christian church. There, the mob stripped Hypatia naked and murdered her using ostraka, which can either be translated as "roof tiles" or "oyster shells". Later historian John of Nikiû also tells a similar story. Even later historian Byzantinist Fr. Adrian Fortescue, says that the mob of Christian Parabalani and Peter, cruelly tore her to pieces on the steps of a church. Damascius adds that they also cut out her eyeballs. They tore her body into pieces and dragged her limbs through the town to a place called Cinarion, where they set them on fire. According to Watts, this was in line with the traditional manner in which Alexandrians carried the bodies of the "vilest criminals" outside the city limits to cremate them as a way of symbolically purifying the city.

==== Cyril's involvement ====
Although Socrates Scholasticus never explicitly identifies Hypatia's murderers, they are commonly assumed to have been members of the parabalani. Christopher Haas disputes this identification, arguing that the murderers were more likely "a crowd of Alexandrian laymen". Socrates Scholasticus unequivocally condemns the actions of the mob, declaring, "Surely nothing can be farther from the spirit of Christianity than the allowance of massacres, fights, and transactions of that sort."

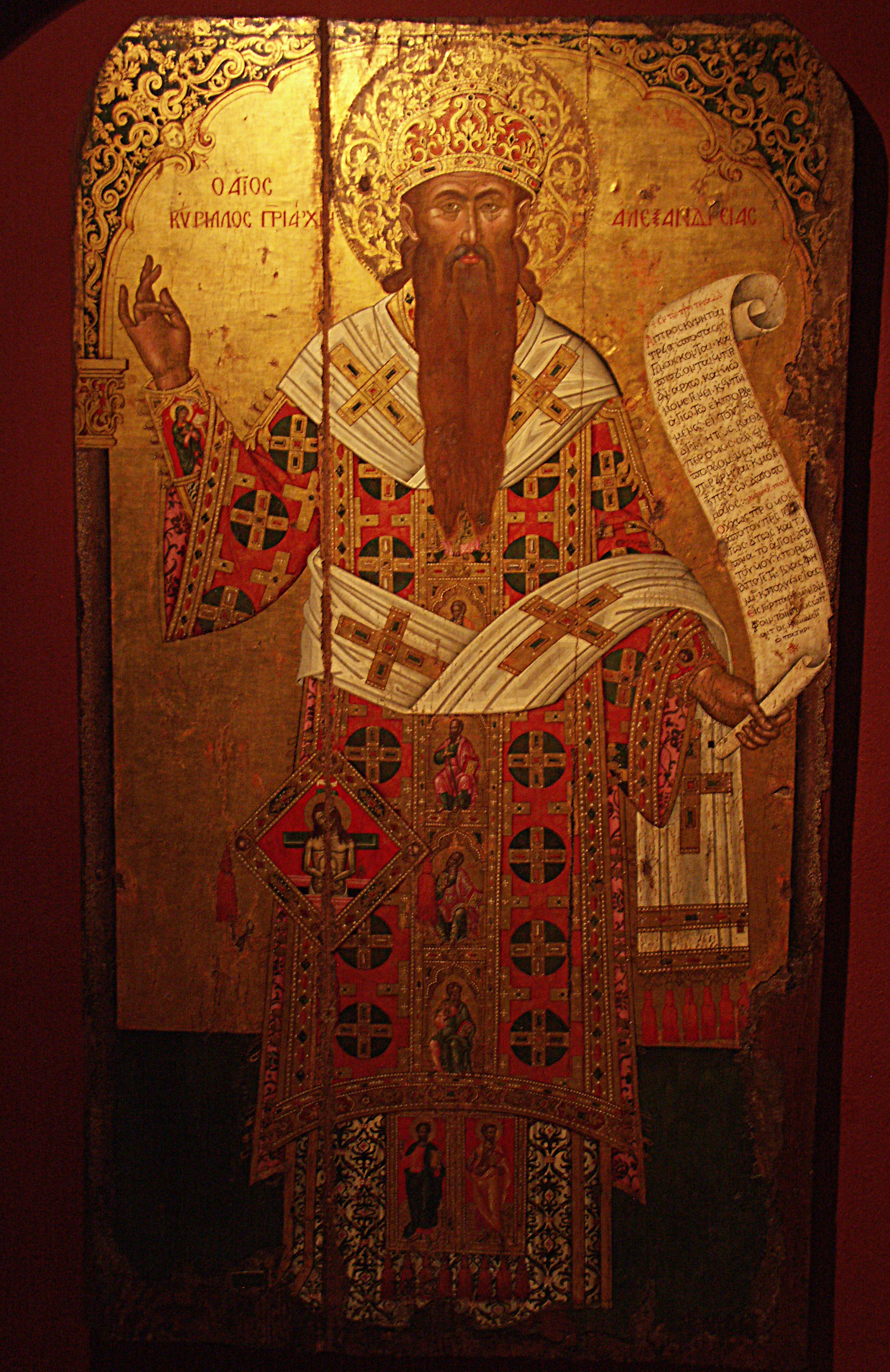
Icon of Saint Cyril by Emmanuel Tzanes - 1654.

Neoplatonist historian Damascius (c. 458 – c. 538) was "anxious to exploit the scandal of Hypatia's death", and attributed responsibility for her murder to Bishop Cyril and his Christian followers. Damascius's account of the Christian murder of Hypatia is the sole historical source naming Bishop Cyril. Some modern studies, as well as the 2009 Hypatia biopic Agora represent Hypatia as falling casualty to a conflict between two Christian factions, one peaceful and moderate and led by Orestes, with the support of Hypatia, and fundamentalist faction enforced by Parabalani and led by Patriarch Cyril. According to lexicographer William Smith, "She was accused of too much familiarity with Orestes, prefect of Alexandria, and the charge spread among the clergy, who took up the notion that she interrupted the friendship of Orestes with their archbishop, Cyril." Scholasticus, alleges that Hypatia fell "victim to the political jealousy which at the time prevailed" and that news of Hypatia's murder, "brought no small disgrace", not only to Patriarch Cyril but to the whole Christian Church in Alexandria, "for murder and slaughter and all such things are altogether opposed to the Christian religion."

After the murder, a deputation of citizens went to Constantinople to petition the Emperor for an investigation so as to prevent such horrors in the future and to put down the disorderly Parabalani, however they urged for the Patriarch to be allowed to remain in the city (Orestes wanted him banished). However, according to Damascius, Cyril himself allegedly only managed to escape even more serious punishment by bribing one of Theodosius's officials. Indeed, the investigation resulted in the emperors Honorius and Theodosius II issuing an edict in autumn of 416, which attempted to remove the parabalani from Cyril's power and instead place them under the authority of Orestes. The edict restricted the parabalani from attending "any public spectacle whatever" or entering "the meeting place of a municipal council or a courtroom." It also severely restricted their recruitment by limiting the total number of parabalani to no more than five hundred.

=== Conflict with Nestorius ===
Another major conflict was between the Alexandrian and Antiochian schools of ecclesiastical reflection, piety, and discourse. This long running conflict widened with the third canon of the First Council of Constantinople which granted the see of Constantinople primacy over the older sees of Alexandria and Antioch. Thus, the struggle between the sees of Alexandria and Antioch now included Constantinople. The conflict came to a head in 428 after Nestorius, who originated in Antioch, was made Archbishop of Constantinople.

Cyril gained an opportunity to restore Alexandria's pre-eminence over both Antioch and Constantinople when an Antiochine priest who was in Constantinople at Nestorius' behest began to preach against calling Mary the "Mother of God" (Theotokos). As the term "Mother of God" had long been attached to Mary, the laity in Constantinople complained against the priest. Rather than repudiating the priest, Nestorius intervened on his behalf. Nestorius argued that Mary was neither a "Mother of Man" nor "Mother of God" as these referred to Christ's two natures; rather, Mary was the "Mother of Christ" (Greek: Christotokos). Christ, according to Nestorius, was the conjunction of the Godhead with his "temple" (which Nestorius was fond of calling his human nature). The controversy seemed to be centered on the issue of the suffering of Christ. Cyril maintained that the Son of God or the divine Word, truly suffered "in the flesh." However, Nestorius claimed that the Son of God was altogether incapable of suffering, even within his union with the flesh. Eusebius of Dorylaeum went so far as to accuse Nestorius of adoptionism. By this time, news of the controversy in the capital had reached Alexandria. At Easter 429 A.D., Cyril wrote a letter to the Egyptian monks warning them of Nestorius's views. A copy of this letter reached Constantinople where Nestorius preached a sermon against it. This began a series of letters between Cyril and Nestorius which gradually became more strident in tone. Finally, Emperor Theodosius II convoked the Council of Ephesus (in 431) to solve the dispute. Cyril selected Ephesus as the venue since it supported the veneration of Mary. The council was convoked before Nestorius's supporters from Antioch and Syria had arrived and thus Nestorius refused to attend when summoned. Predictably, the Council ordered the deposition and exile of Nestorius for heresy.

However, when John of Antioch and the other pro-Nestorius bishops finally reached Ephesus, they assembled their own Council, condemned Cyril for heresy, deposed him from his see, and labelled him as a "monster, born and educated for the destruction of the church". Theodosius, by now old enough to hold power by himself, annulled the verdict of the Council and arrested Cyril, but Cyril eventually escaped. Having fled to Egypt, Cyril bribed Theodosius's courtiers, and sent a mob led by Dalmatius, a hermit, to besiege Theodosius's palace, and shout abuse; the emperor eventually gave in, sending Nestorius into minor exile (Upper Egypt). Cyril died about 444, but the controversies were to continue for decades, from the "Robber Synod" of Ephesus (449) to the Council of Chalcedon (451) and beyond.

== Theology ==
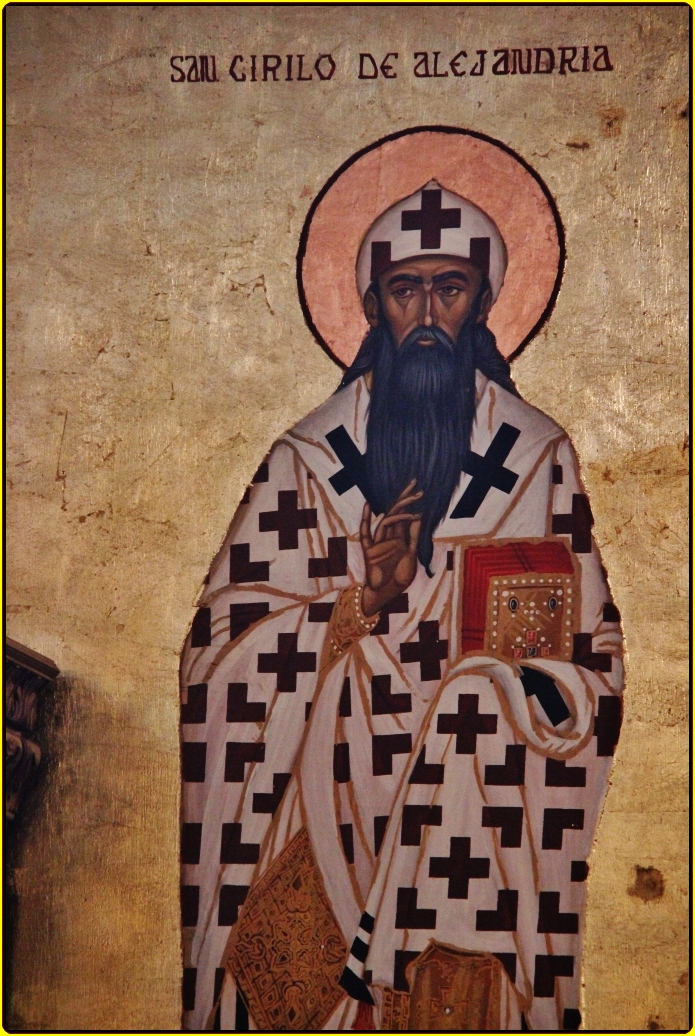
Icon of St. Cyril of Alexandria

Cyril regarded the embodiment of God in the person of Jesus Christ to be so mystically powerful that it spread out from the body of the God-man into the rest of the race, to reconstitute human nature into a graced and deified condition of the saints, one that promised immortality and transfiguration to believers. Nestorius, on the other hand, saw the incarnation as primarily a moral and ethical example to the faithful, to follow in the footsteps of Jesus. Cyril's constant stress was on the simple idea that it was God who walked the streets of Nazareth (hence Mary was Theotokos, meaning "God bearer", which became in Latin "Mater Dei" or "Dei Genitrix", or Mother of God), and God who had appeared in a transfigured humanity. Nestorius spoke of the distinct "Jesus the man" and "the divine Logos" in ways that Cyril thought were too dichotomous, widening the ontological gap between man and God in a way that some of his contemporaries believed would annihilate the person of Christ.

The main issue that prompted this dispute between Cyril and Nestorius was the question which arose at the Council of Constantinople: What exactly was the being to which Mary gave birth? Cyril affirmed that the Holy Trinity consists of a singular divine nature, essence, and being (ousia) in three distinct aspects, instantiations, or subsistencies of being (hypostases). These distinct hypostases are the Father, the Son or Word (Logos), and the Holy Spirit. His christology is a topic of debate. He taught of "μία φύσις τοῦ θεοῦ λόγου σεσαρκωμένη", meaning "one physis of the Word of God made flesh". This resulted in the miaphysite slogan "One Nature united out of two" being used to encapsulate the theological position of this Alexandrian bishop.

According to Cyril's theology, there were two states for the Son of God: the state that existed prior to the Son (or Word/Logos) becoming enfleshed in the person of Jesus and the state that actually became enfleshed. The Logos Incarnate suffered and died on the Cross, and therefore the Son was able to suffer without suffering. Cyril passionately argued for the continuity of a single subject, God the Word, from the pre-Incarnate state to the Incarnate state. The divine Logos was really present in the flesh and in the world—not merely bestowed upon, semantically affixed to, or morally associated with the man Jesus, as the adoptionists and, he believed, Nestorius had taught.

=== Mariology ===
Cyril of Alexandria became noted in Church history because of his spirited fight for the title "Theotokos" during the First Council of Ephesus (431), establishing the ecclesiastically settled basis for all subsequent mariological developments. Prior to the controversy over the theology of Nestorius, Cyril rarely if ever used the Mariological title, but theo-political circumstances compelled him as Archbishop of one of the Empire's chief sees, to become involved and develop his theology."

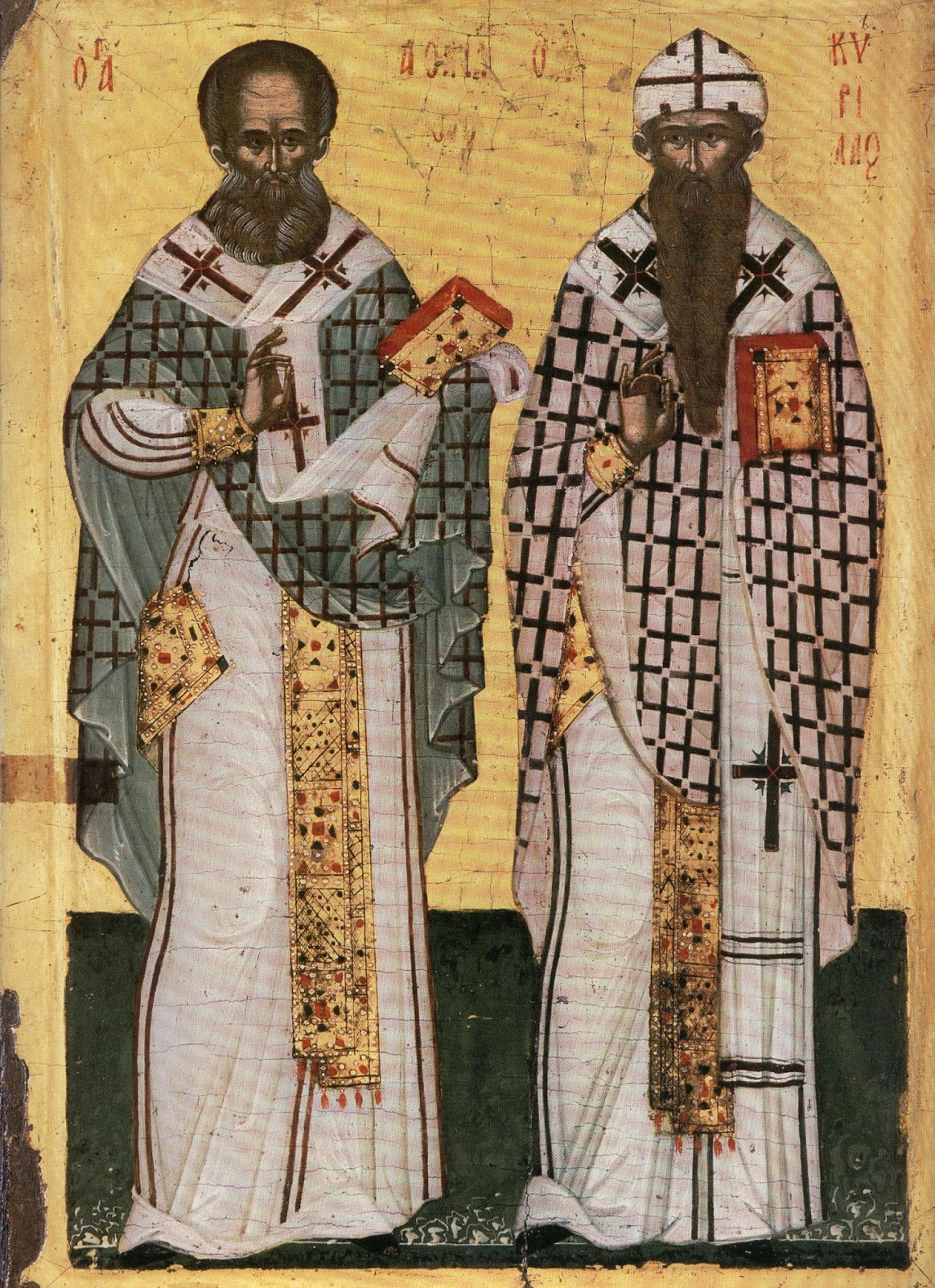
Cretan Icon of Saints Cyril and Athanasius of Alexandria, 16th–17th Century

Beginning in 429 Cyril wrote a series of letters to various ecclesiastical authorities in which he espoused the orthodoxy of "Theotokos". The propriety of the term was justified through appeals to earlier theologians who had used it, like Athanasius, the Cappadocians, and Atticus. Following an epistolary exchange with the increasingly unpopular archbishop of Constantinople, in 430 Cyril wrote his famous 12 Anathemas in which anyone who refused to call Mary Theotokos was condemned. The following year over 100 bishops met in council at Ephesus to rule on the disputes. In between sessions at the Council Cyril delivered a number of sermons; some of those attributed to his hand are of disputed authorship, but 6 are recognised as genuine. Homily IV delivered upon the late arrival of western delegates is a particularly striking example of Cyril's developed Mariology. It is the foremost expression of Cyril's devotion to Mary, and is one of the first historical attestations of the salutation Χαῖρε ("Hail") being used to invoke the Virgin, a practice later standardised in Byzantine homiletics and hymnography such as the sermons of Chrysippus and Basil of Selecucia, and the Akathist hymn. Mary, who is credited with calling the council fathers together, embodies for Cyril the paradoxes of orthodox Christology, "container of the uncontained" and "the place for the infinite", among other lauded descriptions. Cyril's notions of the identity of Christ, therefore, have direct bearing on the identity of Mary. Wessell explains how "Cyril's spatial metaphors construed Mary as a sacred place" and how he "applied metaphors depicting royalty and exaltation to Mary: she was the treasure of the world, the crown of virginity, and the sceptre of orthodoxy." Subsequently, such praise would become normative in Marian theology.

In several of his works, Cyril focuses on the love of Jesus for his mother. On the Cross, he overcomes his pain and thinks of his mother. At the wedding in Cana, he bows to her wishes. The conflict with Nestorius was mainly over this issue, and some have argued that it has often been misunderstood. "[T]he debate was not so much about Mary as about Jesus. The question was not what honors were due to Mary, but how one was to speak of the birth of Jesus." Wessell notes that in Homily V delivered at the council, Cyril argued that Nestorius' refusal to acknowledge God's incarnate birth from Mary was a blasphemy against Christ. At the same time, the close relationship between Christological and Mariological formulations going back to the Cappadocian Fathers created a climate wherein intellectual argumentation over disputed theology overlapped with blossoming lay piety. When the Council of Ephesus convened under Cyril's presidency it did so in the newly constructed Church of Mary, a venue that contributed to the devotional matrix of the debates. Whereas in the past scholars have often argued that Marian piety and theology only developed in the wake of the conciliar decrees, Shoemaker considers this to be refuted by the picture emerging from liturgical and archaeological evidence. The substance of Cyril's argumentation was Christological in orientation. His mature Mariology was chiefly in service to this, and to the end of discrediting Nestorius. Yet Wessel, quoting Homily IV, notes that the enthusiastic praises go beyond the strictly Christological. "She was not only valuable as a vessel storing something sacred but was herself precious and venerated: ‘Is it even possible for people to speak of the celebrated Mary? The virginal womb; O thing of wonder! The marvel strikes me with awe!’" Such sentiments served to further distinguish what Cyril believed to be orthodox theology from that which Nestorius taught, characterising the latter as subversive to both church and empire. As "scepter of orthodoxy", Mary became the standard of Christological fidelity in Cyril's theology; Nestorius's denial of "Theotokos" became the identifiable sign of his impugning of the divinity of Jesus.

St. Cyril received an important recognition of his preachings by the Second Council of Constantinople (553 d.C.) which declared;

"St. Cyril who announced the right faith of Christians" (Anathematism XIV, Denzinger et Schoenmetzer 437).

== Works ==
Cyril was a scholarly archbishop and a prolific writer. In the early years of his active life in the Church he wrote several exegetical documents. Among these were: Commentaries on the Old Testament, Thesaurus, Discourse Against Arians, Commentary on St. John's Gospel, and Dialogues on the Trinity. In 429 as the Christological controversies increased, the output of his writings was so extensive that his opponents could not match it. His writings and his theology have remained central to the tradition of the Fathers and to all Orthodox to this day.

- Becoming Temples of God (Ναοὶ θεοῦ χρηματιοῦμεν) (in Greek original and English)
- Second Epistle of Cyril to Nestorius
- Commentary on the Letter to Hebrews
- Third Epistle of Cyril to Nestorius (containing the twelve anathemas)
- Formula of Reunion: In Brief (A summation of the reunion between Cyril and John of Antioch)
- The "Formula of Reunion", between Cyril and John of Antioch
- Five tomes against Nestorius (Adversus Nestorii blasphemias)
- That Christ is One (Quod unus sit Christus)
- Scholia on the incarnation of the Only-Begotten (Scholia de incarnatione Unigeniti)
- Against Diodore of Tarsus and Theodore of Mopsuestia (fragments)
- Against the synousiasts (fragments)
- Commentary on the Gospel of Luke
- Commentary on the Gospel of John
- Against Julian the Apostate
- Cyrilli Alexandrini liber Thesaurus adversus hereticos a Georgio Trapesuntio traductus (in Latin and Greek)

=== Translations ===
- Cyril of Alexandria: Select Letters, edited and translated by Lionel R. Wickham (Oxford: Clarendon Press, 1983).
- Letters 1-50, translated by John I. McEnerney (Washington, DC: Catholic University of America Press, 1987).
- Letters 51-110, translated by John I. McEnerney (Washington, DC: Catholic University of America Press, 1987).
- St. Cyril of Alexandria: The Christological Controversy, translated by John A. McGuckin (Leiden: E. J. Brill, 1994).
- On the Unity of Christ, translated by John A. McGuckin (New York: St Vladimir's Seminary Press, 1997).
- Cyril of Alexandria, by Norman Russell (London: Routledge, 2000) - contains translations of selections from the Commentary on Isaiah, Commentary on John, Against Nestorius, An Explanation of the Twelve Chapters, and Against Julian.
- Against Those who are Unwilling to Confess that the Holy Virgin is Theotokos, edited and translated by Protopresbyter George Dion. Dragas (New Hampshire: Orthodox Research Institute, 2004)
- Commentary on the Twelve Prophets: Volume 1, translated by Robert C. Hill (Washington, DC: Catholic University of America Press, 2007).
- Commentary on the Twelve Prophets: Volume 2, translated by Robert C. Hill (Washington, DC: Catholic University of America Press, 2008).
- Commentary on Isaiah, translated by Robert C. Hill (Massachusetts: Holy Cross Orthodox Press, 2008).
- Festal Letters: 1-12, edited with introduction and notes by John J. O'Keefe and translated by Philip R. Amidon, S.J. (Washington, DC: Catholic University of America Press, 2009).
- Commentary on the Twelve Prophets: Volume 3, translated by Robert C. Hill (Washington, DC: Catholic University of America Press, 2012).
- Festal Letters: 13-30, edited with introduction and notes by John J. O'Keefe and translated by Philip R. Amidon, S.J. (Washington, DC: Catholic University of America Press, 2013).
- Commentary on John: Volume 1, edited by Joel C. Elowsky and translated with introduction and notes by David R. Maxwell (Illinois: IVP Academic, 2013).
- Three Christological Treatises, translated by Daniel King (Washington, DC: Catholic University of America Press, 2014).
- Commentary on John: Volume 2, edited by Joel C. Elowsky and translated with introduction and notes by David R. Maxwell (Illinois: IVP Academic, 2015).
- Glaphyra on the Pentateuch, Volume 1: Genesis, translated by Nicholas P. Lunn with introduction by Gregory K. Hillis (Washington, DC: Catholic University of America Press, 2018).
- Glaphyra on the Pentateuch, Volume 2: Exodus through Deuteronomy, translated by Nicholas P. Lunn (Washington, DC: Catholic University of America Press, 2019).
- Christological Dialogue on the Incarnation of the Only-Begotten, edited by Ramez Mikhail, translated with introduction by Emmanuel Gergis, and foreword by Fr. Michel Najim (Burke, Virginia: Agora University Press, 2020).
- Commentary on the Letter to the Hebrews, translated by Khachik Grigoryan (Yerevan: Ankyunacar Publishing, 2021).
- Commentaries on Romans, 1-2 Corinthians, and Hebrews, edited by Joel C. Elowsky and translated with introduction and notes by David R. Maxwell (Illinois: IVP Academic, 2022).

== See also ==
- Coptic Orthodox Church
- Council of Ephesus
- Nestorius of Constantinople
- Dyophysitism
- Miaphysitism
- Monophysitism
- Saint Cyril of Alexandria, patron saint archive

== Citations ==
=== Sources ===
- "Cyril I (412–444)". Official web site of the Greek Orthodox Patriarchate of Alexandria and All Africa.
- Constas, Nicholas (2003). Proclus of Constantinople and the cult of the Virgin in late antiquity : homilies 1-5, texts and translations. Brill. ISBN 90-04-12612-0. OCLC 801325432.
- Dzielska, Maria (1995). Hypatia of Alexandria. Revealing Antiquity, 8. Cambridge, Massachusetts: Harvard University Press. ISBN 0-674-43775-6. OCLC 31295206.
- Fortescue, Adrian (2007). The Greek Fathers: Their Lives and Writings. Ignatius Press.
- Haas, Christopher (1997), Alexandria in Late Antiquity: Topography and Social Conflict, Baltimore, Mississippi and London: The Johns Hopkins University Press, ISBN 978-0-8018-5377-7
- Mosshammer, Alden A. (2008). The Easter Computus and the Origins of the Christian Era. Oxford: Oxford University Press. ISBN 9780199543120.
- Novak, Ralph Martin Jr. (2010), Christianity and the Roman Empire: Background Texts, Harrisburg, Pennsylvania: Bloomsbury Publishing, pp. 239–240, ISBN 978-1-56338-347-2
- O'Carroll, Michael (2000). Theotokos : a theological encyclopedia of the Blessed Virgin Mary. Wipf and Stock Publishers. ISBN 1-57910-454-1. OCLC 47771920.
- Watts, Edward J. (2008) [2006], City and School in Late Antique Athens and Alexandria, Berkeley and Los Angeles: University of California Press, ISBN 978-0520258167
- Watts, Edward J. (2017), Hypatia: The Life and Legend of an Ancient Philosopher, Oxford, England: Oxford University Press, ISBN 978-0190659141
- Wessel, Susan (2004). Cyril of Alexandria and the Nestorian Controversy: The Making of a Saint and of a Heretic. Oxford: Oxford University Press. ISBN 9780199268467.
- Zuidhoek, Jan (2019). Reconstructing Metonic 19-year Lunar Cycles (on the basis of NASA's Six Millennium Catalog of Phases of the Moon). Zwolle. ISBN 9789090324678.

Titles of the Great Christian Church
Preceded by Theophilus	Pope and Patriarch of Alexandria; 412–444	Succeeded by Dioscorus I
