= Maggie Greenwald =

American filmmaker (born 1955)

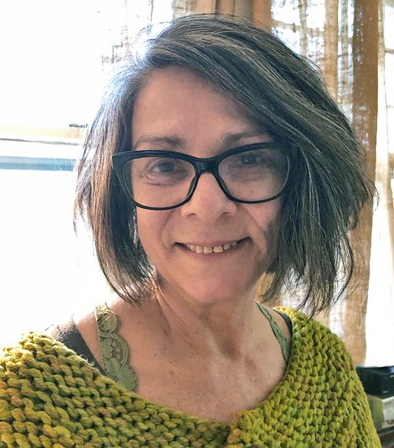
- Born: June 23, 1955 (age 71); Queens, New York, U.S.
- Occupations: Film director, television director, screenwriter
- Years active: 1981–present
- Spouse: David Mansfield (m. 1994)
- Children: 2
- Relatives: Alison Leslie Gold (sister)

Maggie Greenwald is an American filmmaker.

Most recognized as an independent writer and director, Greenwald’s most notable films include Sophie and the Rising Sun (2016), starring an ensemble cast that included Margo Martindale, Julianne Nicholson, Lorraine Toussaint and Diane Ladd, Songcatcher (2000) starring Aidan Quinn and Janet McTeer and introducing Emmy Rossum, and The Ballad of Little Jo (1993), starring Suzy Amis and Ian McKellen. She also directed an adaptation of Jim Thompson's The Kill-Off featuring an ensemble cast that included Cathy Haase and the film debut of Jorja Fox.

== Career ==
Greenwald’s first feature film, Home Remedy (1987), from her original screenplay, premiered at the Munich Film Festival before screening at the London and Torino Film Festivals, and opening at the prestigious Film Forum in New York.

The next film she directed was The Kill-Off (1989), which she adapted from Jim Thompson’s noir novel of the same name. Acquired by Channel 4 in Britain, and released theatrically by Palace Filmed Entertainment, the film also appeared at film festivals around the world, including: Sundance (in Dramatic Competition), Munich (opening night, American Independent section), London, Florence, Deauville, Toronto and Edinburgh, before winning the Best Director Award at the Torino Film Festival before its release in the US. The film is listed in the BFI (British Film Institute) Screen Guides as one of the 100 best American Independent Films. It established Greenwald’s as a significant independent filmmaking voice.

Greenwald went on to write and direct her groundbreaking Western, The Ballad of Little Jo (1993), which was released worldwide by Fine Line Features and Polygram Filmed Entertainment. Star Suzy Amis was nominated for an Independent Spirit Award while co-star David Chung won the award for Best Supporting Actor. A great deal has been written about the film by scholars of the Western who consider The Ballad of Little Jo a landmark revisionist film within the genre. The film is also one of the primary subjects of Modleski’s Old Wives Tales and Other Women’s Stories, which explores “the phenomenon of female authors and performers who ‘cross-dress’ - women, that is, who are moving into male genres and staking out territory declared off-limits by men and by many feminists.”

Subsequently, Greenwald wrote and directed Songcatcher (2000). An unconventional, naturalistic musical, the film premiered in Dramatic Competition at the Sundance Film Festival, where it garnered a Special Jury Award for Ensemble Performance. The film received the first Alfred P. Sloan Foundation Feature Film Prize, Deauville Film Festival Audience Award, two Independent Spirit Award nominations (for actors Emmy Rossum and Pat Carroll) and a GLAAD Award nomination.

Greenwald’s most recent film, Sophie and the Rising Sun (2016), is based on the novel by Augusta Trobaugh. She adapted, produced and directed the film, which premiered at the Sundance Film Festival 2016, Salt Lake City Gala World Premiere.

Throughout her career, Greenwald has shifted back and forth between directing feature films and directing television. Her numerous TV movies include What Makes a Family, starring Brooke Shields, Whoopi Goldberg, and Cherry Jones. It was produced by Barbra Streisand and Whoopi Goldberg, with Academy Award-winning producers Craig Zadan and Neil Meron. The Lifetime Television Channel movie went on to win a prestigious GLAAD Award for Outstanding Television Movie and a Humanitas Award. Other TV movies include Get A Clue, starring Lindsay Lohan, Tempted starring Virginia Madsen, Comfort and Joy, Lifetime Television’s Christmas standard, and Good Morning, Killer, starring Catherine Bell, based on April Smith’s Ana Grey novel.

Recent television work includes episodes of Nashville and Madam Secretary, including the controversial episode, “Break in Democracy,” which was banned in the Philippines for its portrayal of a fictional Filipino dictator.

Earlier forays in directing for episodic television expanded Greenwald’s work to include children’s television. For Nickelodeon she directed several episodes of The Adventures of Pete and Pete, created the look of the show The Mystery Files of Shelby Woo, for which she directed six episodes over two seasons. She also directed the non-air pilot for a show that evolved into Backyardigans and an episode of Wildfire for ABC Family (now Freeform).

== Personal life ==
Greenwald is married (1994) to composer-musician David Mansfield, who scored many of her films. They have two daughters, Maisie (born 1997) and Lulu (born 2000).

Her siblings include author Alison Leslie Gold.

Greenwald has taught film directing and screenwriting at Sarah Lawrence College, Columbia University Graduate School of the Arts, and NYU’s Tisch School of the Arts.

== Filmography ==
=== Film ===
Year	Title	Director	Writer
1987	Home Remedy	Yes	Yes
1989	The Kill-Off	Yes	Yes
1993	The Ballad of Little Jo	Yes	Yes
2000	Songcatcher	Yes	Yes
2013	The Last Keepers	Yes	No
2016	Sophie and the Rising Sun	Yes	Yes

=== Television ===
Year	Title	Episode(s)
1994–1996	The Adventures of Pete & Pete	
1994–1996	The Adventures of Pete & Pete	"Inspector 34"
1994–1996	The Adventures of Pete & Pete	"Sick Day"
1996–1998	The Mystery Files of Shelby Woo	"Hot Seats: Part 1"
1996–1998	The Mystery Files of Shelby Woo	"Hot Seats: Part 2"
1996–1998	The Mystery Files of Shelby Woo	"Wipeout"
1996–1998	The Mystery Files of Shelby Woo	"Eye of the Storm"
1996–1998	The Mystery Files of Shelby Woo	"The Case of the Knockout Gas"
1996–1998	The Mystery Files of Shelby Woo	"The Mascot Mystery"
1996–1998	The Mystery Files of Shelby Woo	"The John Doe Mystery"
1996–1998	The Mystery Files of Shelby Woo	"The Macbeth Mystery"
1996–1998	The Mystery Files of Shelby Woo	"The Seminole Mystery"
2005	Wildfire	"The Party"
2017	Nashville	"Ghost in This House"
2017	Madam Secretary	"Break in Diplomacy"
2017	Madam Secretary	"Loophole"

=== TV movies ===
- What Makes a Family (2001)
- Get a Clue (2002)
- Tempted (2003)
- Comfort and Joy (2003)
- Good Morning, Killer (2011)
- Christmas on Honeysuckle Lane (2018)

== Awards and nominations ==
Year	Title	Award/Nomination
1987	Home Remedy	Selected for the American Independent Section at the Munich Film Festival; Official selection at the Torino Film Festival
1989	The Kill-Off	Awarded the Jury Special Prize and nominated for the Prize of the City of Torino at the Torino Film Festival; Nominated for the Grand Jury Prize at the Sundance Film Festival; Nominated for the Bronze Horse at the Stockholm Film Festival; Nominated for the Critics Award at the Deauville Film Festival; Selected for the American Independent Section at the Munich Film Festival; Official selection at the London Film Festival
1993	The Ballad of Little Jo	Awarded the Special Jury Award at the Rome-Florence Film Festival
2000	Songcatcher	Awarded the Special Jury Prize and nominated for the Grand Jury Prize at the Sundance Film Festival; Awarded the Feature Film Prize in Science and Technology at the Hamptons International Film Festival; Awarded the Audience Award and nominated for the Grand Special Prize Deauville Film Festival; Awarded the Producer to Watch Award for Richard Miller and Ellen Rigas-Venetis at AFI Fest; Nominated for Outstanding Film (in the limited release category) at the GLAAD Media Awards; Awarded the Dorothy Arzner Prize at the Director's View Film Festival
2001	What Makes a Family	Awarded for Outstanding Television Movie at the GLAAD Media Awards; Nominated for 90 Minute or Longer Cable Category at the Humanitas Prizes
