= Takashi Yamaguchi (architect) =

Japanese architect (born 1953)

Takashi Yamaguchi (山口 隆, Takashi Yamaguchi, born February 20, 1953) is a Japanese architect, born in Kyoto. He graduated from Kyoto University and worked for Tadao Ando and Associates. He founded his own architectural firm, Takashi Yamaguchi & Associates, in 1996. Yamaguchi served as a visiting professor at the Osaka University of Arts in 2005, and in 2009 served as visiting professor at Columbia University and visiting scholar at Harvard. He is a professor at Osaka Sangyo University and a member of the Japan Institute of Architects and the Architectural Institute of Japan. He is an elite member of the Supporters of Romania Research at the Academy of Romanian Scientists. He is also a Regional President of Asia Designer Communication Platform.

== Biography ==
In 1988, Yamaguchi was a founding member of ARX, an international research group for theory and practice of architecture which has offices in New York, Geneva, Berlin, and Lisbon. The group includes staff from the offices of Peter Eisenman and Daniel Libeskind, as well as theorists from Columbia University. He founded Takashi Yamaguchi & Associates in 1996, and served as a visiting scholar at Harvard University in 2010.

== Works ==
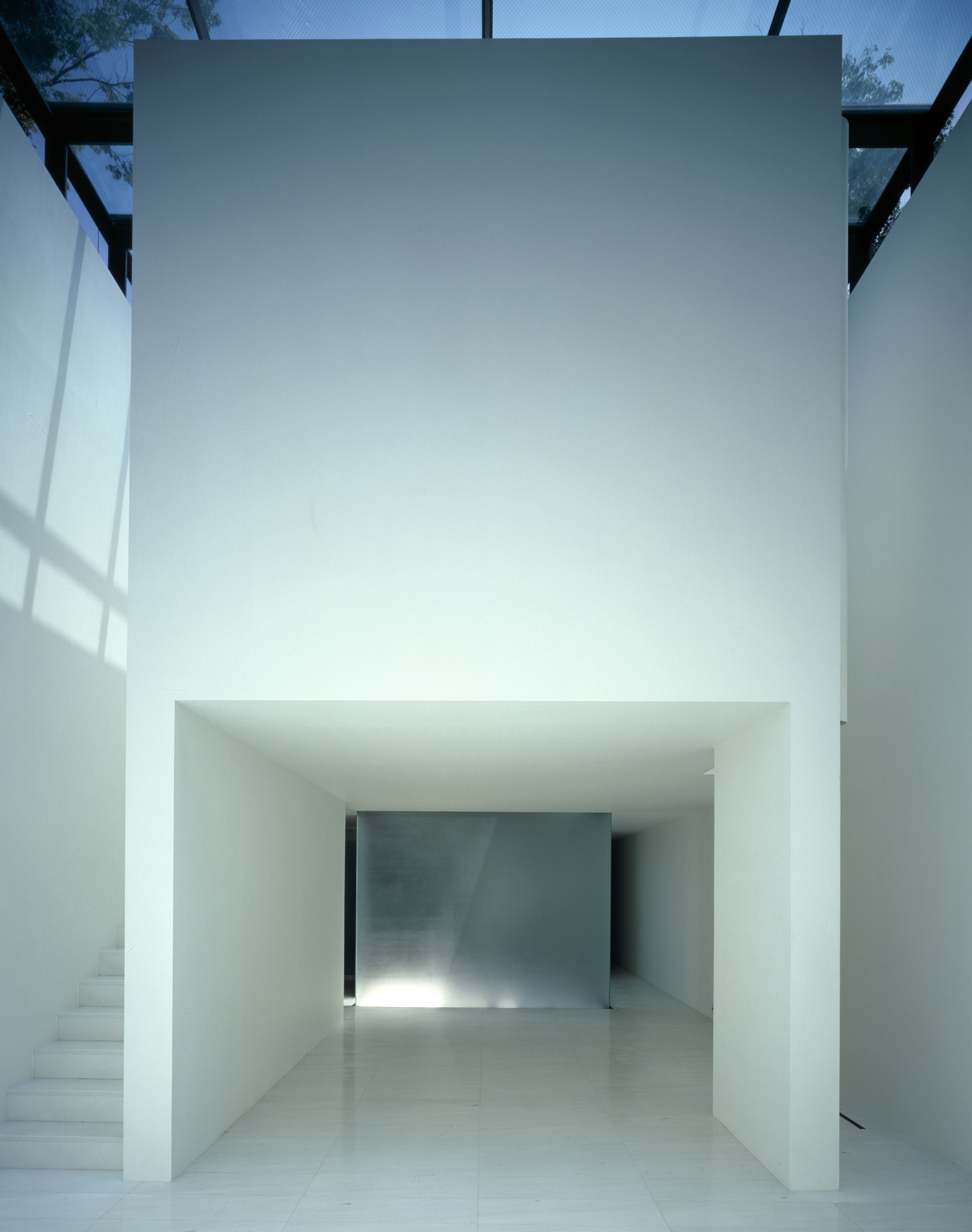
Glass Temple

- 1998: Glass Temple, Kyoto
- 2000: White Temple, Kyoto
- 2004: Metal Office, Kyoto
- 2008: Silent Office, Tokyo
- 2009: Breathing Factory, Osaka
- 2010: House in Ise, Mie Prefecture
- 2011: Parametric Fragment, Mie Prefecture
- 2012: Koshimo Plus, Hyōgo Prefecture

== Awards ==
- 1992: Finalist of Spreebogen International Competition for a New German Capital in Berlin with "ARX", Germany
- 1999: Asakura Prize, The 18th Space Design Review, Japan
- 2001: 1st place, the 9th DuPont Benedictus Awards, United States
- 2005: Good Design Award, Japan
- 2005: Barbara Cappochin Architecture Prize, Italy
- 2005: Finalist of JIA Architectural Awards, Japan
- 2005: JIA Architectural Awards Selection, Japan
- 2007: Intermedia-globe Silver Prize, World Media Festival, Germany
- 2008: Good Design Award, Japan
- 2009: Good Design Award, Japan
- 2011: The Kyoto Design Award, Japan
- 2011: Selected Dedalo Minosse International Prize, Italy

== Exhibitions ==
- 1998: Exhibition, Glass Temple, Japan
- 1999: The 18th Space Design Review, Japan
- 2000: Exhibition, Eindhoven University of Technology, Netherlands
- 2001: Exhibition, University of Art and Design Helsinki, Finland
- 2002: CAS: Contemporary Art and Spirits, Japan
- 2004: Designer's Week Exhibition, Japan
- 2004: International Architectural Biennale in Beijing, China
- 2004: Liquid Stone: New Architecture in Concrete, National Building Museum, United States
- 2005: International Biennal Barbara Cappochin Exhibition, Padua, Italy
- 2005: Good Design Award Presentation, Japan
- 2005: AD 5 ans Exposition, Bibliothèque nationale de France, Paris, France
- 2006: Salzburg Reinberg International Competition, Austria
- 2007: Exhibition, Eion Mincu University of Architecture and Urbanism, Romania
- 2007: Parallel Nippon – Contemporary Japanese Architecture – 1996–2006, Tokyo Metropolitan Museum of Photography
- 2008: Good Design Award Exhibition, Japan
- 2009: Good Design Award Exhibition, Japan
- 2009: arquitectura japonesa desde miradas argentinas, Argentina
- 2010: Contemplating the Void: Interventions in the Guggenheim Museum Rotunda, Guggenheim Museum, New York
- 2010: Barbara Cappochin International Biennale in Japan, Institution of Italian Culture, Japan
- 2011: Dedalo Minosse International Prize Exhibition, Italy
- 2011: The Kyoto Design Award Exhibition, Japan
- 2012: GA Houses Projects 2012 Exhibition, Japan
- 2012: Vertical Urban Factory: East Asia Exhibition, New York University's Department of East Asian Studies, New York
