= Sophie and the Rising Sun =

2001 novel by Augusta Trobaugh

- Author: Augusta Trobaugh
- Language: English
- Genre: Fiction
- Publisher: Dutton
- Publication date: 2001
- Publication place: United States
- Media type: Print (Hardback)
- Pages: 208
- ISBN: 9780525946274

Sophie and the Rising Sun is a novel written by American author Augusta Trobaugh. It was published in 2001 by publishing company Dutton. The novel was well received, especially throughout the southern states of America. It is classified under the romance genre and primarily focuses on two main characters, Sophie and Mr. Oto, during the days before the attack on Pearl Harbor. Sophie and the Rising Sun was written in a narrative style, the story being told from the perspective of Sophie's childhood best friend, Miss Anne who is the moral center of the community.

== Plot ==
Sophie and the Rising Sun takes place in a small fictional town called Salty Creek, Georgia, in the days before the bombing of Pearl Harbor. The story focuses on the main character Sophie, a single spinster who has spent the majority of her adult life caring for her aging mother and two elderly aunts, who suffer from dementia. Sophie's mother is controlling during her childhood and early adult years, refusing to allow Sophie to date, telling her "Nothing lasts, so no use in getting started with it." Some speculation over her past love affair with a man who had died during a battle in World War I has been alluded to, and is at the center of some gossip between the local housewives. Sophie spends her time painting, tending to crab traps in a nearby lake, and going to book clubs. She is seen by the local community as a "proper and polite lady" but also as a topic of some conversation by the local gossip, Ms. Ruth, because she does not attend church services every Sunday morning.

The story also focuses on another character, Mr. Oto, a Japanese-American who through a series of events ends up stuck in Salty Creek under the care of the local doctor and his wife after he was found on a bus, too weak from malnutrition and sleep loss to make his way back to California, where his father and other family members live. After his stay at the doctor's home he moves into the back yard of Sophie's childhood friend, Miss Anne to work as her gardener.

Mr. Oto spends two years in Salty Creek, during which he is known by the local community as "Miss Anne's Chinese gardener." After a while Mr. Oto and Sophie fall into the habit of meeting along the riverbank outside of town to paint in silence while the rest of the townsfolk gather at the church. Slowly over the course of the years they begin falling in love, and when they are beginning to realize their love news of the Pearl Harbor bombings hits Salty Creek. After the bombings Mr. Oto is viewed as suspicious for his quiet demeanor and Asian heritage. When Ms. Ruth begins to suspect and spread rumors that Mr. Oto is actually Japanese, he is forced to go into hiding in a small hunting cabin outside of town.

== Themes and genre ==
At its core, Sophie and the Rising Sun is a romance novel about dressed-up racism in a time and place where people of a different race had a proper role and place in the community. The story relies heavily on symbolism as well, when Mr. Oto is reminded of a story from his homeland of a bride who was transformed into a crane.

Although the majority of Trobaugh's writings have been described as "Christian fiction" Dutton Publishers has told Publishers Weekly that they are reluctant to call it anything other than "good clean fiction that depicts southern life."

== Adaptations ==
Sophie and the Rising Sun is an independent feature film based on the novel by Augusta Trobaugh and adapted and directed by critically acclaimed filmmaker Maggie Greenwald (Songcatcher, Ballad Of Little Jo). The film stars Julianne Nicholson (August: Osage County, Masters of Sex, The Red Road), Margo Martindale (August: Osage County and Emmy Award winner for The Americans and Justified), Critics Choice Award winner Lorraine Toussaint (Orange Is the New Black, Rosewood), Diane Ladd (Joy, three-time Academy Award nominee for Alice Doesn’t Live Here Anymore, Ramblin’ Rose and Wild at Heart) and Takashi Yamaguchi. The film is produced by Brenda Goodman (Ballad Of Little Jo, Sex(Ed) The Movie), Nancy Dickenson (Home of the Brave), Lorraine Gallard (Home of the Brave), and Maggie Greenwald. Co-producer is Susan Lazarus. The film was selected by the 2016 Sundance Film Festival as its Salt Lake City Gala Premiere.
