= Parabalani =

Early Christian brotherhood

The Parabalani (Late Latin parabalānī, "persons who risk their lives as nurses", from Ancient Greek: παραβαλανεῖς) or Parabolani (from παραβολᾶνοι or παράβολοι) were the members of a brotherhood, who in early Christianity voluntarily undertook the care of the sick and the burial of the dead, knowing that they themselves could die.

Generally drawn from the lower strata of society, they also functioned as attendants to local bishops and were sometimes used by them as bodyguards and in violent clashes with their opponents.

== History ==
The parabalani had neither orders nor vows, but were enumerated among the clergy and enjoyed clerical privileges and immunities. In addition to performing works of mercy they constituted a bodyguard for the bishop. Their presence at public gatherings or in the theaters was forbidden by law. At times they took a very active part in ecclesiastical controversies, as at the Second Council of Ephesus. They received their name from the fact that they were hospital attendants, although the alternative name parabolani also became current, because they risked their lives (παραβάλλεσθαι τὴν ζωήν) in exposing themselves to contagious diseases.

It has been alleged, though without sufficient proof, that the brotherhood was first organized during the great plague in Alexandria in the episcopate of Pope Dionysius of Alexandria (second half of the 3rd century). Though they took vows before the bishop and officially remained under his control, the Codex Theodosianus placed them instead under the command of the praefectus augustalis, the imperial governor of Roman Egypt.

Because their actions resulted in many other riots, successive imperial laws limited their numbers: thus a law issued in 416 restricted the enrollment in Alexandria to 500, a number increased two years later to 600. In Constantinople, the number was further restricted from 1100 to 950. According to Adrian Fortescue, the parabolani, who he says, "were not nice people", seem to have disappeared by Emperor Justinian I's time.

== In film ==
In the 2009 film Agora, focusing on the life of Hypatia, the parabolani start out as Christian volunteers who distribute bread to the poor, but gradually turn into fanatical death squads who murder pagans, Jews, and fellow Christians who oppose fundamentalist Patriarch Cyril of Alexandria.
