= Hypatia (disambiguation) =

Hypatia (c. 370–415), was a Greek scholar and philosopher who was considered the first notable woman in mathematics.

Hypatia (or Hipatia) may also refer to:

== Fiction ==
- Hypatia (novel) by Charles Kingsley
- Hypatia, a character based on Hypatia of Alexandria in the series The Heirs of Alexandria by Mercedes Lackey, Eric Flint and Dave Freer
- Hypatia, a character based on Hypatia of Alexandria in the novel Baudolino by Umberto Eco
- Hypatia, the main character in the 2009 film Agora, played by Rachel Weisz
- Dr. Alexandria Hypatia, a character named for Hypatia of Alexandria in the video game Dishonored 2
- The scientific research ship Hypatia in the novel Illuminae by Amie Kaufman and Jay Kristoff
- Hypatia Cade, the protagonist of the novel The Ship Who Searched by Anne McCaffrey and Mercedes Lackey

== Philosophy ==
- Hypatia, a 1720 work by John Toland
- Hypatia: A Journal of Feminist Philosophy, a scholarly publication for research in feminism and philosophy
- Hypatia transracialism controversy, a dispute that began in April 2017 about an article in Hypatia

== Astronomy ==
- Hypatia (planet), an exoplanet
- Hypatia (crater), a feature of the Moon
- 238 Hypatia, a C-type main belt asteroid
- Hypatia (stone), a series of small stones, claimed by some to derive from the core of the hypothetical LDG comet

== Other uses ==
- Hipatia, Argentina, a town in Santa Fe Province, Argentina
- Hypatia (moth), a genus of moths in the subfamily Arctiinae
- Hypatia Sans an Adobe font created in 2002
- Hyapatia Lee, actress
- Hypatia (given name)
