= Hypatia (given name) =

Female given name

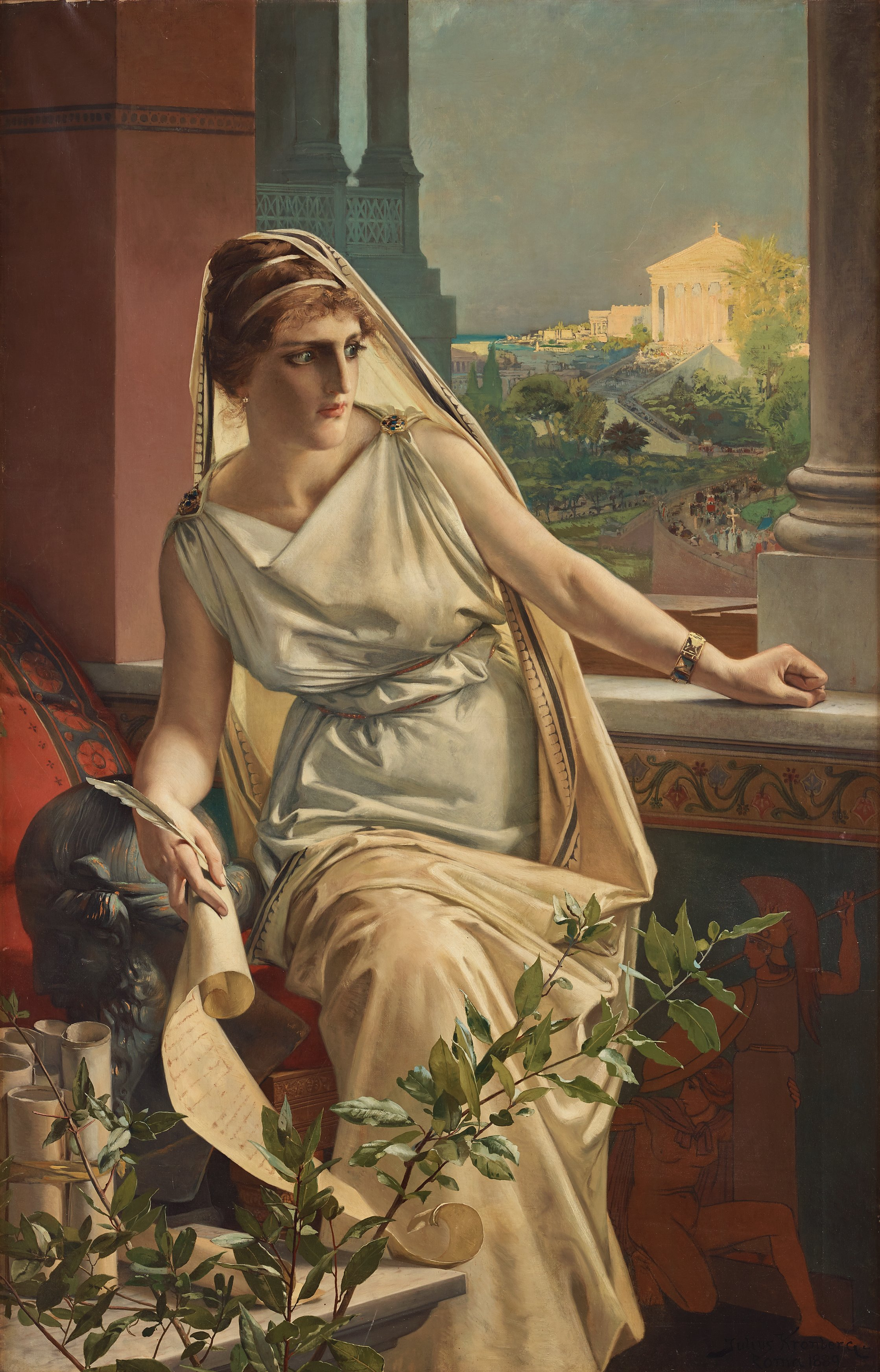
- Hypatia by Julius Kronberg, 1889.
- Pronunciation: English: /iːpɑːˈtiːɑː/; English: /hɪˈpɑːtiːjɑː/ English: /haɪˈpeɪʃə/
- Gender: Feminine
- Language: Greek

Origin
- Meaning: highest, supreme

Other names
- Related names: Hypatius, Tia

Hypatia is a feminine given name of Ancient Greek origin derived from the word hypatos (Greek): (ὕπατος), meaning highest, supreme. It is often given in reference to Hypatia of Alexandria (c. 350 to 370–415), the Neoplatonist philosopher, astronomer, and mathematician. It is a feminine form of the masculine Greek name Hypatius.

== Women ==
- Hypatia (c. 350 to 370-March 415), Neoplatonist philosopher, astronomer, and mathematician from Alexandria, Egypt
- Hypatia Bradlaugh Bonner (1858–1935), British peace activist, author, atheist and freethinker

== Stage name ==
- Hyapatia Lee, stage name of American former adult film actress Vicki Lynch

== Fictional characters ==
- Hypatia, the titular character of Hypatia, an 1853 historical novel about Hypatia of Alexandria by English author Charles Kingsley
- Hypatia, a character played by actress Rachel Weisz in the 2009 English-language Spanish historical drama film Agora, a fictionalized account of the life of Hypatia of Alexandria
- Hypatia "Tia" Cade, a character in the 1992 science fiction novel The Ship Who Searched by American writers Anne McCaffrey and Mercedes Lackey
