= Hypatia delecta =

Scientific classification
- Domain: Eukaryota
- Kingdom: Animalia
- Phylum: Arthropoda
- Class: Insecta
- Order: Lepidoptera
- Superfamily: Noctuoidea
- Family: Erebidae
- Subfamily: Arctiinae
- Genus: Hypatia
- Species: H. delecta

Binomial name
- Hypatia delecta (Butler, 1896)

Synonyms
- Hysia delecta Butler, 1876

Species of moth

Hypatia delecta is a moth of the subfamily Arctiinae. It was described by Arthur Gardiner Butler in 1896. It is found in Pará, Brazil.
