= Women in Mathematics (book) =

Book by Lynn M. Osen

- Author: Lynn M. Osen
- Language: English
- Genre: Non-fiction
- Publisher: MIT Press
- Publication date: 1974
- Publication place: United States

Women in Mathematics is a book on women in mathematics. It was written by Lynn M. Osen, and published by the MIT Press in 1974.

== Topics ==
The main content of the book is a collection of eight biographies of women mathematicians, arranged chronologically, with an additional introductory chapter and two closing chapters. The mathematicians profiled here are Hypatia, Maria Gaetana Agnesi, Émilie du Châtelet, Caroline Herschel, Sophie Germain, Mary Somerville, Sofya Kovalevskaya, and Emmy Noether.

One of the two closing chapters features shorter profiles of additional women mathematicians, "rather curiously selected" and "mostly working in America". The scientists mentioned in this chapter are Mary W. Gray, Mina Rees, Lise Meitner, Maria Goeppert Mayer, Charlotte Scott, Hanna Neumann, Maria Pastori, Maria Cibrario, Jacqueline Lelong-Ferraud, Paulette Libermann (misspelled Liberman), Sophie Piccard (misspelled Picard), Olga Taussky-Todd, Emma Lehmer (misspelled Lermer), Julia Robinson, Elizabeth Scott, Grace Hopper and Dorothy Maharam Stone.

== Reception ==
Although reviewer Philip Peak found the book "interesting and useful", and reviewer Florica T. Câmpan writes that it is written in a pleasant style, most reviewers were not as positive. Hardy Grant writes that Osen's profile of Hypatia has treated her "very badly" by being based primarily on a piece of fiction for children written in the early 20th century by Elbert Hubbard. Reviewer R. P. Infante writes that "Osen does not seem to know much mathematics or its history", pointing to several errors in both. Infante also bemoans the book's "narrow" and "slipshod" scholarship, consisting of vague attributions to "some scholars" in the text of the work that "invariably" lead to the work of a single author, early 20th century writer John Augustine Zahm. Reviewer Herbert Meschkowski suggests that Grace Chisholm Young should have been mentioned. And reviewers Margaret Hayman and Edith Robinson both complain about the book's focus on its subjects' victimization by society, rather than either their personal lives and personalities or their mathematical accomplishments. Michael A. B. Deakin wrote, "Sadly, the standard of Osen's scholarship did not match the importance of her subject matter."
