= Hypatia melaleuca =

Scientific classification
- Kingdom: Animalia
- Phylum: Arthropoda
- Class: Insecta
- Order: Lepidoptera
- Superfamily: Noctuoidea
- Family: Erebidae
- Subfamily: Arctiinae
- Genus: Hypatia
- Species: H. melaleuca

Binomial name
- Hypatia melaleuca (Walker, 1854)

Synonyms
- Glaucopis melaleuca Walker, 1854

Species of moth

Hypatia melaleuca is a moth of the subfamily Arctiinae. It was described by Francis Walker in 1854. It is found in Pará, Brazil.
