= Hypatia (painting) =

Painting by Charles William Mitchell

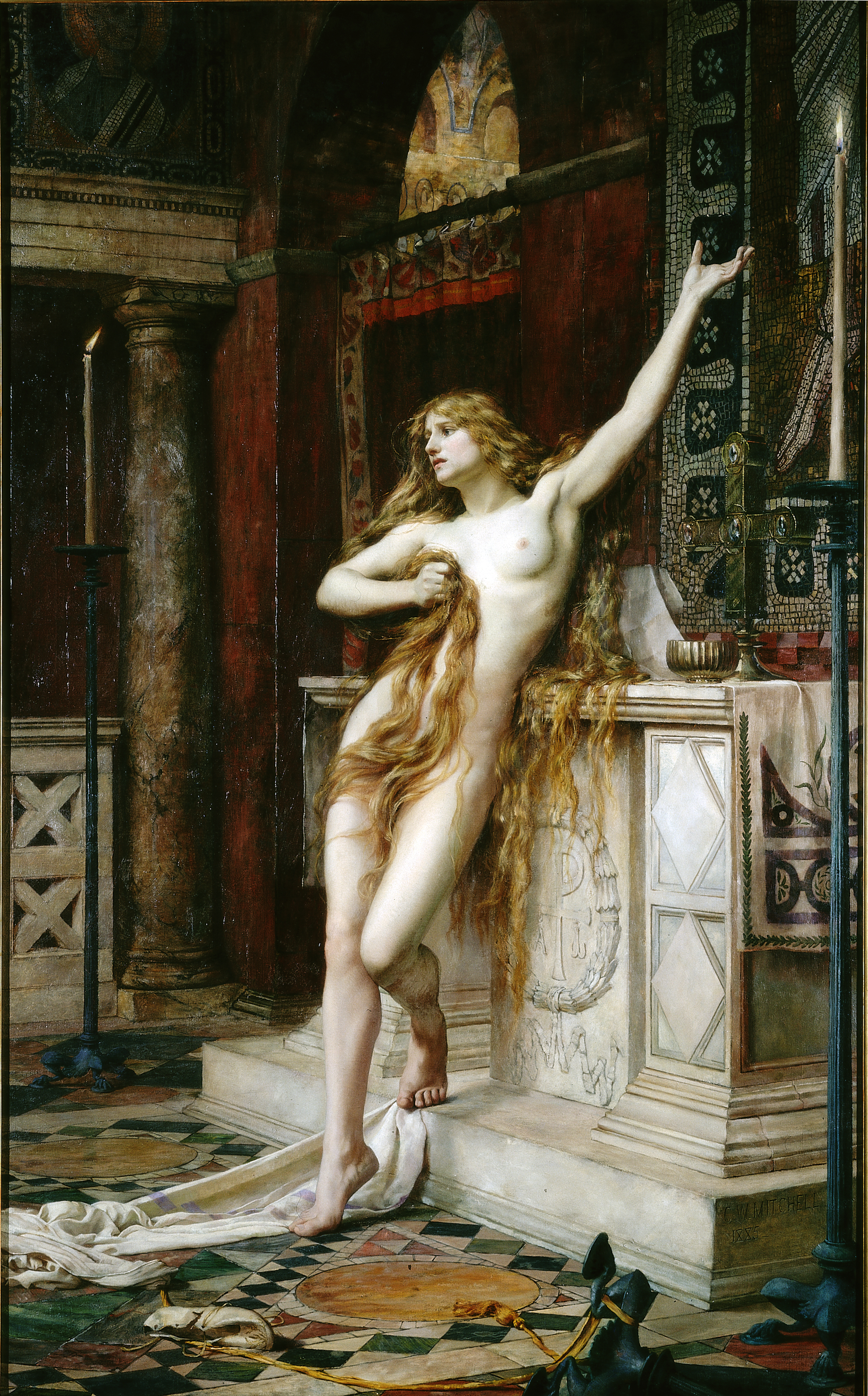
- Artist: Charles William Mitchell
- Year: 1885
- Medium: Oil on canvas, history painting
- Dimensions: 244.5 cm × 152.5 cm (96.3 in × 60.0 in)
- Location: Laing Art Gallery; Newcastle

Hypatia is an 1885 oil painting by the British artist Charles William Mitchell. Inspired by the 1853 novel Hypatia by Charles Kingsley, it combines elements of history painting and nude art. Set in Alexandria during the fifth century it depicts the last moments of the philosopher Hypatia before she was murdered.

The painting was displayed at the Grosvenor Gallery's London exhibition of 1885. Along with John William Waterhouse's Saint Eulalia shown at the Royal Academy Exhibition of 1885, it provoked a public debate about the prevalence of nude art. Today the painting is in the collection of the Laing Art Gallery in Newcastle, having been acquired in 1940.

== Bibliography ==
- Liversidge, Michael & Edwards, Catherine. Imagining Rome British Artists and Rome in the Nineteenth Century. Merrell Holberton, 1996.
- Smith, Alison. The Victorian Nude: Sexuality, Morality, and Art. Manchester University Press, 1996.
