= Azazeel =

2008 novel by Youssef Ziedan

- Author: Youssef Ziedan
- Language: Arabic
- Genre: historical fiction
- Published: Atlantic Books
- Publication date: 2008
- Publication place: Egypt
- English publication date: 2012
- Pages: 300 (first edition)
- ISBN: 085789773X

Azazeel (Arabic: عزازيل) is a novel by Youssef Ziedan, published by "Dar Al-Shorouk" in 2008. Its events take place in the fifth century AD between Upper Egypt, Alexandria and northern Syria, following the adoption of Christianity by the Roman Empire. The novel won the International Prize for Arabic Fiction in 2009.

== Plot summary ==
A (fictitious) translator's note introduces the novel as the autobiography of an Egyptian monk named Hypa, written in 431 AD, claiming that the text was discovered at an archaeological site near Aleppo in the late 1990s.

Hypa recounts his life from his birth in Aswan in 391. He alternates between descriptions of events, personal philosophical and spiritual musings written in a stream-of-consciousness style, and conversations between himself and the devil, Azazeel, whom Hypa believes is urging him to write his story.

As a child, Hypa witnesses the murder of his pagan father by a group of Christians, leaving him with lingering internal conflict between his Christian faith and anger towards his father's killers. Hypa studies medicine in Akhmim before leaving for Alexandria to become a monk at around the age of twenty-three.

Arriving in Alexandria, Hypa finds the Christian populace, led by Bishop Cyril, persecuting the local pagan and Jewish communities. He meets and is enthralled by a wealthy Egyptian Greek pagan woman named Octavia. Octavia, believing Hypa was sent to her by Poseidon, takes him into her palatial home and they spend three days engaged in sexual debauchery, but upon telling her he is a Christian, Octavia is enraged and ejects Hypa from her home. Wandering the city, he attends a mathematical lecture given by Hypatia, before joining Cyril's church as a monk. In 415, Hypa watches helplessly as a mob incited by Cyril's anti-pagan rhetoric lynches Hypatia; Octavia is also killed in the violence. Distraught, Hypa departs Alexandria and crosses the Sinai desert.

In Jerusalem, Hypa meets and befriends the priest Nestorius. They discuss the violence in Alexandria and the Christological divisions within the Church. On Nestorius's recommendation, Hypa joins a monastery near Aleppo, where over many years he becomes renowned for his medical knowledge. In 430, Nestorius, now the Bishop of Constantinople, summons Hypa to Antioch. There he reveals that Cyril has publicly condemned Nestorius as a heretic over Nestorius's opposition to Cyril's belief that Christ's human and divine natures are inseparable. Hypa advises caution and conciliation to avoid further conflict, but Nestorius is not dissuaded and condemns Cyril in response.

A woman named Martha and her aunt come to live in a cottage near the monastery, and Hypa is tasked by the abbot to teach Martha and some local boys to sing hymns in the church. Hypa and Martha fall in love, leaving him torn between his monastic vows and his love for Martha. Martha's aunt learns of their relationship and plans to marry Martha to a Roman soldier; learning of this, Hypa falls into a fever, experiencing visions of Azazeel taunting him. Upon recovering, Hypa finds that Martha has left, and that Nestorius has been deposed at Ephesus. Azazeel, arguing that he lives inside Hypa and is merely the name humanity has given its darker impulses, convinces Hypa to write the account of his life, after which Hypa departs the monastery for an unknown destination.

== Controversy ==
The novel caused controversy because it dealt with ancient Christian theological disputes over the nature of Christ and the status of the Virgin, and the persecution that Christians practiced against Egyptian pagans in the periods when Christianity became the religion of the Egyptian majority.

The novel is based on the travels of an Egyptian monk in the fourth century AD. The Coptic Orthodox Church accused the novel of defaming Christianity and inciting sectarian strife between Islam and Christianity in Egypt.

== Awards ==
- Winner 2009, The International Prize for Arabic Fiction (IPAF)
