= Jo Beall =

British sociologist

- Born: 1952 (age 73–74); London, England

Academic background
- Education: University of Natal; London School of Economics

Academic work
- Discipline: Economist
- Sub-discipline: Development studies; economic development; economic history
- Institutions: University College London; London School of Economics; University of Cape Town; British Council

Jo Beall, FAcSS (born 1952) is a British economist and academic, specialising in development studies, economic development and economic history.

== Early life and education ==
Beall was born in 1952 in London, England. She was educated at La Sagesse School, a private Catholic school in Newcastle upon Tyne, and at Our Lady of Fatima Convent School, a private school in Durban, South Africa. She studied economic history at Natal University, graduating with a Bachelor of Arts (BA) degree in 1982 and a Master of Arts (MA) degree in 1983.

While a student in South Africa, she became involved in anti-apartheid activism and the United Democratic Front: she was imprisoned for three months due to her anti-apartheid activities, and was only allowed to leave the country because of her British citizenship. She continued her studies at the London School of Economics in England, graduating with a Doctor of Philosophy (PhD) degree in 1997. Her doctoral thesis was titled "Households, livelihoods and the urban environment: social development perspectives on solid waste management in Faisalabad, Pakistan".

== Academic career ==
Beall began her academic career lecturing at University College London. She then joined the London School of Economics where she rose to become Professor of Development Studies in 2001 and director of its Development Studies Institute from 2004 to 2007.

She returned to South Africa where she had taken her bachelor's degree to become deputy vice-chancellor (academic, external relations and international) at the University of Cape Town (2009–2011), and was then director (education and society) at the British Council from 2011 to her retirement in 2019. Since 2019, she has been emeritus professor and a distinguished research fellow at the London School of Economics.

Beall is an elected Fellow of the Academy of Social Sciences (FAcSS).

== Selected works ==
- Beall, Jo, ed. (1997). A city for all: valuing difference and working with diversity. London: Zed Books. ISBN 978-1856494779.
- Beall, Jo; Crankshaw, Owen; Parnell, Susan (2002). Uniting a divided city: governance and social exclusion in Johannesburg. London: Earthscan Publications. ISBN 978-1853839214.
- Beall, Jo (2005). Funding local governance: small grants for democracy and development. Rugby: ITDG Publishing. ISBN 978-1853395970.
- Beall, Jo; Fox, Sean (2009). Cities and development (1st ed.). Abingdon: Routledge. ISBN 978-0415390989.
- Beall, Jo; Guha-Khasnobis, Basudeb; Kanbur, Ravi, eds. (2010). Urbanization and development: multidisciplinary perspectives. Oxford: Oxford University Press. ISBN 978-0199590148.
- Beall, Jo (2011). Invention and intervention in African cities. Berlin: Lit. ISBN 978-3643801067.
