= La Sagesse School =

School in Newcastle upon Tyne, England (1906–2008)

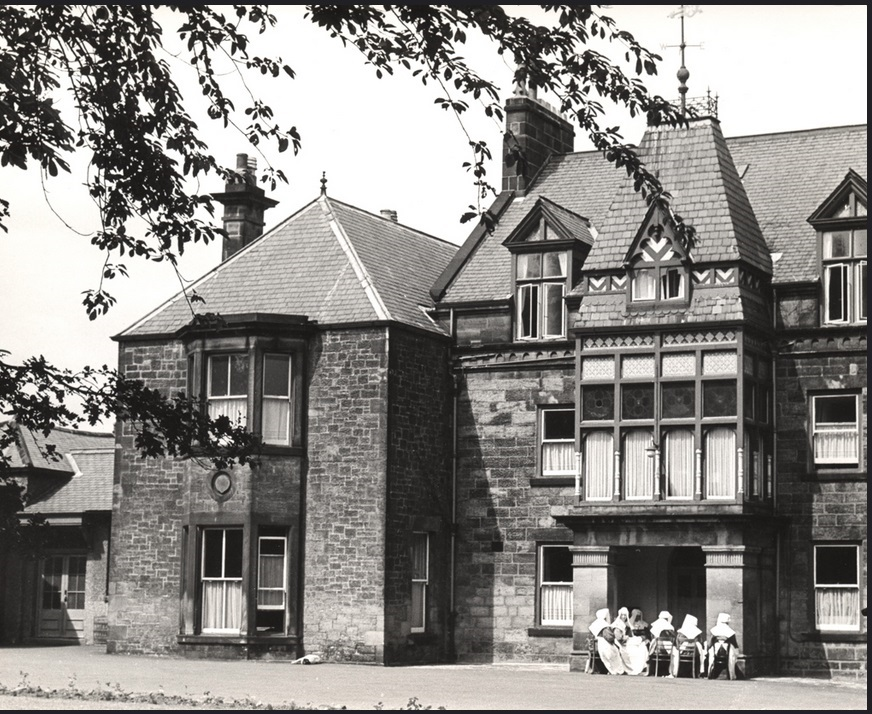
- The school in 1964 with a group of nuns sitting in front of the entrance

Location
- The Towers, Jesmond; Newcastle upon Tyne, Tyne and Wear, NE2 3RJ; England; 54.9985°N 1.6062°W

Information
- Type: Private school
- Religious affiliation: Roman Catholic
- Established: 1906
- Closed: 2008
- Local authority: Newcastle City Council
- Oversight: Roman Catholic Diocese of Hexham and Newcastle
- Department for Education URN: 108539 Tables
- Head teacher: Linda Clark
- Gender: Girls
- Age range: 3–18
- Capacity: 262
- Website: www.lasagesse.org.uk

Listed Building – Grade II*
- Official name: La Sagesse School, Jesmond Towers
- Designated: 17 December 1971
- Reference no.: 1024954

La Sagesse School was a 3–18, Roman Catholic, private school for girls in Jesmond, Newcastle upon Tyne, Tyne and Wear, England. It was established in 1906 and closed in 2008. It occupied Jesmond Towers, a Grade II* listed building and was located in the Roman Catholic Diocese of Hexham and Newcastle.

== History ==
Jesmond Towers was built to a gothic design in the early 19th century. In 1869, it was bought by Charles Mitchell and his wife, Anne, who made it their family home. Their son, Charles William Mitchell, who was a great art enthusiast, displayed important paintings in the lounge. In 1890, Anne's sister, Emily, who was in a state of depression following the death of her husband, threw herself from the battlements of Jesmond Towers and is said to haunt the building: she is referred to as the "Pink Lady".

Following Anne's death in 1899, her son, Charles William Mitchell, inherited the house and, following Charles William's death in 1903, the Mitchell family moved to Pallinburn, near Ford, Northumberland. Jesmond Towers was acquired by the Filles de la Sagesse (Daughters of Wisdom in English) in 1912. (Note: The Daughters of Wisdom established many schools including one in Low Fell in 1906 before they bought Jesmond Towers.)

The school established its own board of governors and rented the building from the Daughters of Wisdom. However, the school faced increasing competition from other local private schools (e.g. the Royal Grammar School, Newcastle particularly once the Royal Grammar School began admitting girls in all years in 2008) and when the Daughters of Wisdom decided to treble the rent in 2008, the governors decided to close the school.

In 2009, Freddy Shepherd (a Newcastle United F.C. shareholder) acquired the site for development and in 2013, sold the house to Jeff Winn, a solicitor, who secured that part of the site as part of a joint purchase with David Wilson Homes.

== Notable alumnae ==
- Gillian Allnutt (b. 1949), poet
- Jo Beall (b. 1952), academic
- Linden Travers (1913–2001), actress
- Denise Welch (b. 1958), actress and television presenter
- Susan Williams (b. 1967), junior minister

== See also ==
- Grade II* listed buildings in Tyne and Wear
