= Youssef Ziedan =

Egyptian scholar (born 1958)

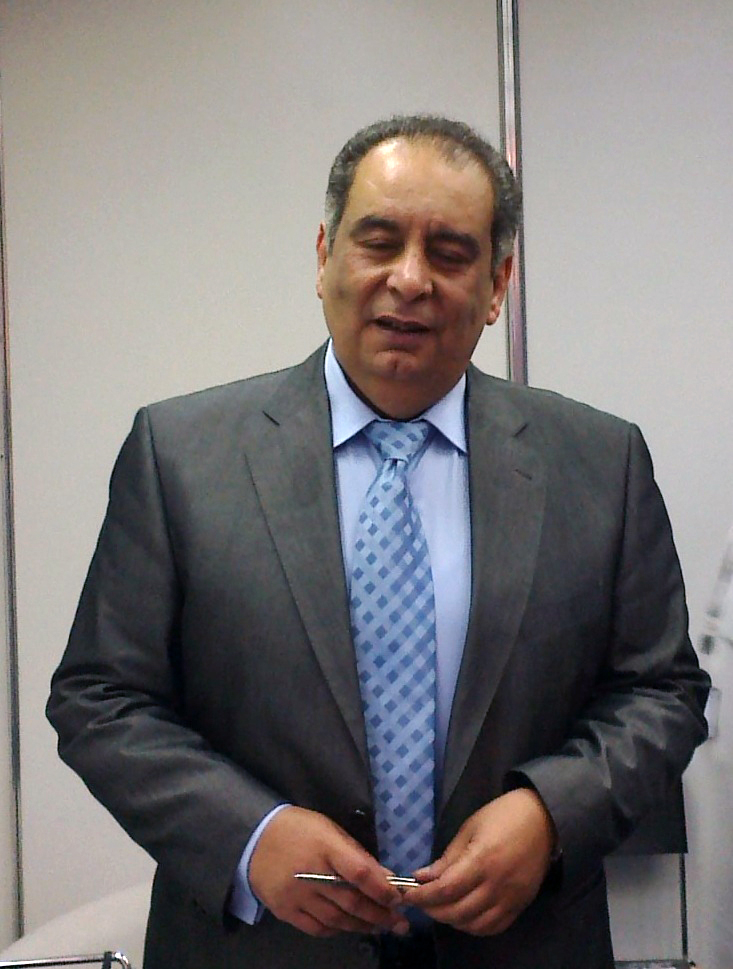
- Born: 30 June 1958 (age 68); Sohag, Egypt
- Education: Alexandria University (PhD)
- Occupation: Novelist
- Children: Alaa, Aya, Mai
- Writing career
- Language: Arabic
- Period: 1976–1980
- Notable work: Azazeel
- Notable awards: Medical Knowledge and Heritage Authentication Award from the Islamic Organization of Medicine/Kuwait Foundation for the Advancement of Sciences; the ‘Abdul-Hamīd Shūmān Prize in the field of social studies (Jordan); and the International Prize for Arabic Fiction for his best selling novel Azazeel

Youssef Ziedan (Arabic: يوسف زيدان) (born 30 June 1958) is an Egyptian writer and scholar who specializes in Arabic and Islamic studies. He is a public lecturer, columnist, and prolific author of more than 50 books. He is also director of the Manuscript Center and Museum at the Bibliotheca Alexandrina.

His primary scholarly interests are in cataloguing, editing, and publishing Arabic and Islamic manuscripts. He has worked as a consultant in the field of Arabic heritage preservation and conservation in a number of international institutions, including UNESCO, ESCWA, and the Arab League, and has also directed a number of projects aimed at the identification and preservation of Arabic manuscript heritage.

== Biography ==
Ziedan was born in Sohag, Egypt, in 1958. When he was still a child, he moved with his grandfather to Alexandria, where he was raised and educated.

He joined the philosophy department at the University of Alexandria and graduated summa cum laude. His postgraduate studies focused on Sufism and its philosophical underpinnings. He obtained his PhD degree in 1989 for his dissertation on The Qadiri Sufi Order, with a study and edition of the poetical works of Abdul Qadir al-Jilani.

Ziedan lives in Alexandria with his family.

== Scholarship ==
=== Sufism studies ===
Ziedan's work on Sufism underscores not just the mystic introspective lineaments of Islamic Sufism, but, more importantly, its philosophical underpinnings. He has placed consistent emphasis on the study of Ibn Arabi and Abdul Karim al-Jili, regarded as two of the most important figures of philosophical Sufism in the history of Islam. His work on Abdul Karim al-Jili is seen by commentators as the most authoritative work in the field.

=== Islamic philosophy ===
The most distinctive feature in Ziedan's study of Islamic philosophy is his attempt to uncover the origins of a strand of Islamic philosophical thought that, in his view, had not been influenced by Hellenistic philosophy. He thinks that the parable of Hayy Ibn Yaqzan, for instance, with its many versions and interpretations by such important figures as Avicenna, Ibn Tufayl, al-Suhrawardi and Ibn al-Nafis, is a source for understanding Islamic philosophy on its own terms. This view forms the basis of his re-editing of the complete philosophical parable of Hayy Ibn Yaqzan in his Hayy Ibn Yaqzan: the Four Texts and their Authors.

Ziedan's work as a public intellectual is reflected in several of his later works, including Arabic Theology and Rationals Behind Religious Violence اللاهوت العربي وأصول العنف الديني which examines the dynamics behind the key ideas that shaped the faiths of Judaism, Christianity, and Islam, and their links to each other and to the geography of the region.

=== History of Islamic medicine ===
Another dimension to Ziedan's work is his study of the history of Islamic medicine, which draws him into the scientific realms of medicine, mathematics, astronomy, chemistry, and related topics. His scholarly career has included extensive explorations of the scientific heritage of Arab peoples throughout history, with special focus on medicine. He has studied the Arabic translations, commentaries and annotations on Hippocrates and Galen especially. Furthermore, his studies on Ibn al-Nafis and his critical edition of his grand medical encyclopedia (30 volumes) al-Shamil fil Sina’a al-Tibbiyya catapulted Ziedan into being considered an Ibn al-Nafis expert.

=== Arabic manuscript preservation ===
Ziedan sees cataloguing as an ars maior that has not received the attention it deserves. According to him, cataloguing is the key to a panoramic view of a particular manuscript heritage. With this in mind, Ziedan produced some 20 manuscript catalogues using detailed descriptive cataloguing techniques rather than short, uninformative bibliographic records. His catalogues are mostly thematic, i.e. they are not general catalogues, but handle each theme of knowledge separately.

== Fiction ==
In addition to his scholarship, Ziedan is also a published author of award-winning Arabic fiction.

His 2006 novel Zil al-Af'a ("Shadow of the Serpent") is critically-acclaimed. The novel treats the notion of the sacred female through a contemporary setting with humdrum personae in the first part; in the second part, letter fragments from a female anthropologist to her daughter, the heroine of the first part, explain how the role of the female has been misshapen, abused and diabolically transformed throughout history. The novel has been criticized for its abnormal structure and superfluous intellectualism.

Ziedan's second novel is the historico-theological work Azazeel (عزازيل), which won the 2009 International Prize for Arabic Fiction. The book is written as if a translation of scrolls that had been discovered in the ruins of a monastery northwest of Aleppo, Syria. An Egyptian monk called “Hypa” wrote the original manuscript as an autobiography in the Aramaic language in the first half of the fifth century AD. This was a time of great internal turmoil in Eastern Christianity.

Ziedan's other novels include The Nabatean (النبطي) in 2012, Places (محال) in 2013 and its sequel, Guantanamo (جونتنامو) in 2013. His novels have been translated into English, French, Italian and Russian, among other languages.

His most recent novel, Fardeqan – the Detention of the Great Sheikh, published by Egypt's Dar el-Shorouk, was shortlisted for the 2020 International Prize for Arabic Fiction.

== Awards and honours ==
- 2009: International Prize for Arabic Fiction (for Azazeel)
- 2013: Banipal Prize for Arabic Literary Translation (won by Jonathan Wright for his translation into English of Ziedan's Azazeel).

== Select bibliography ==
Sufism

- Anonymous Sufi Poets
- Al-Mutawaliyat: studies in Sufism
- Sufi Orders and al-Qadiriyya in Egypt
- A Prologue to Sufism by al-Sulami: a study and a critical edition
- The Poetical Works of Abdul Qadir al-Jilani

Islamic Philosophy

- Hayy Ibn Yaqzan: the four texts and their authors
- Al-Lahut al-'Arabi: and the roots of religious violence

History of Arabic Medicine

- A Commentary on the Hippocratic Aphorisms
- Treatises on Body Parts by Ibn al-Nafis
- Rediscovering ‘Alaa al-Din (Ibn al-Nafis) al-Qarashi
- Treatise on Gout by Rhazes
- Al-Shamil fil al-Sina’a al-Tibbiyya in 30 volumes

Manuscript Cataloguing

- Rare manuscripts in the Alexandria Municipality Collection
- Catalogue of the Alexandria University Manuscript Collection
- Catalogue of the Escorial Monastery Manuscript Collection
- Catalogue of the Religious Institute of Sumuha

Literary Criticism and Fiction

- Iltiqa' al-Bahrin: essays in literary criticism
- The Shadow of the Serpent
- Azazeel
- The Nabatean
- Fardeqan – the Detention of the Great Sheikh
- Al Waraaq – Wishes of Highness
- Hakim – The madness of Ibn Al Haytham
