= Hypatius =

Hypatius or Hypatios is a masculine name of Greek origin meaning highest, supreme.

It may refer to:

- Hypatius of Gangra or Hypatius the Wonderworker, 4th-century bishop and saint
- Hypatius (consul 359)
- Hypatius of Bithynia (died 450 circa), 5th-century monk
- Hypatius (consul 500)
- Hypatius of Ephesus (fl. c. 530), metropolitan of Ephesus
- For the 1st-century saint, see Leontius, Hypatius and Theodulus
