= Hypatia (moth) =

Scientific classification
- Domain: Eukaryota
- Kingdom: Animalia
- Phylum: Arthropoda
- Class: Insecta
- Order: Lepidoptera
- Superfamily: Noctuoidea
- Family: Erebidae
- Subfamily: Arctiinae
- Genus: Hypatia; Kirby, 1892

Synonyms
- Hysia Walker, 1854 (preocc. Mulsant, 1850)

Genus of moths

Hypatia is a genus of moths in the subfamily Arctiinae. The genus was described by William Forsell Kirby in 1892.

== Species ==
- Hypatia delecta Butler, 1896
- Hypatia melaleuca Walker, 1854
