= Charles William Mitchell =

British artist (1854–1903)

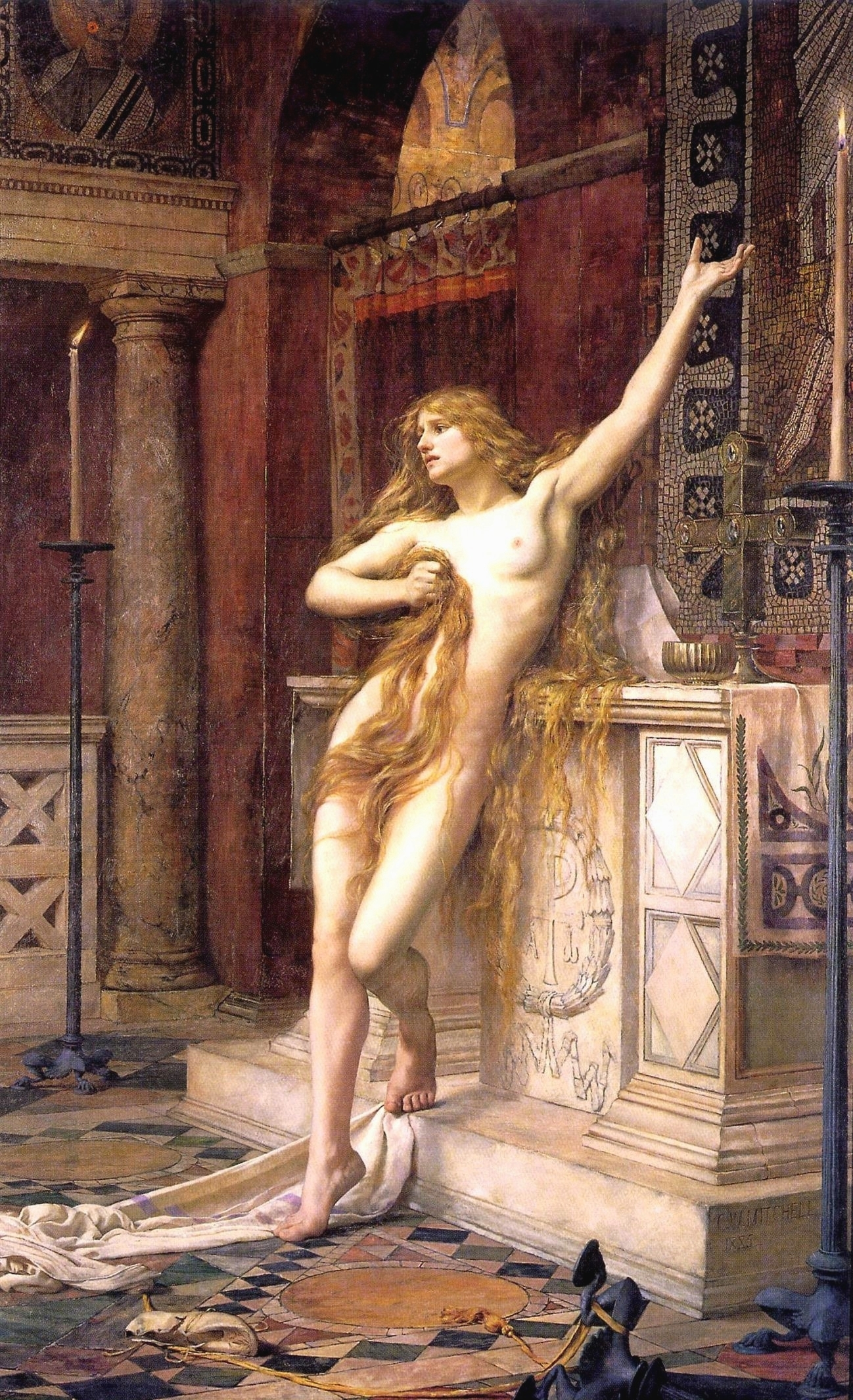
Hypatia by Charles William Mitchell (1885)

Charles William Mitchell (1854–1903) was an English Pre-Raphaelite painter and philanthropist from Newcastle.

== Career ==
Mitchell was a son of the Scottish engineer and shipbuilder Charles Mitchell (1820–1895), who founded a shipyard in Newcastle which joined with that of William Armstrong to become Armstrong, Mitchell, and Company (later Armstron Whitworth). The younger Charles Mitchell was a director of the firm.

Mitchell studied art at Fonteinbleau. He took interest in artistic education and worked on the idea that arts and industry should wrk together; he was chairman of the committee of the Art Department at Durham University College of Science, Newcastle, and was instrumental in establishing the Arts and Handicrafts Guild. His father gave a substantial sum towards extending Marischal College at the University of Aberdeen, and Mitchell himself later donated another substantial sum clearing the university´s debt.

== Artist ==
A contemporary of John William Waterhouse, his work is similar in many ways. His most famous piece was Hypatia, shown in 1885 and likely inspired by the Charles Kingsley serialized novel Hypatia, or New Foes with an Old Face. This painting is currently in the Laing Art Gallery.

He died at Jesmond Towers, Newcastle, on 28 February 1903. He was survived by a widow, a son and two daughters.
