= 238 Hypatia =

Main-belt asteroid

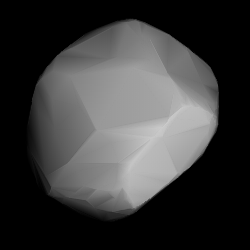
- 3D model based on lightcurve data

Discovery
- Discovered by: Viktor Knorre
- Discovery date: 1 July 1884

Designations
- Pronunciation: /hɪˈpeɪʃiə/
- Named after: Hypatia
- Alternative designations: A884 NA, 1947 HA
- Minor planet category: Main belt
- Adjectives: Hypatian

Orbital characteristics
- Epoch 31 July 2016 (JD 2457600.5)
- Uncertainty parameter 0
- Observation arc: 124.07 yr (45318 d)
- Aphelion: 3.1652 AU (473.51 Gm)
- Perihelion: 2.6514 AU (396.64 Gm)
- Semi-major axis: 2.9083 AU (435.08 Gm)
- Eccentricity: 0.088335
- Orbital period (sidereal): 4.96 yr (1811.5 d)
- Average orbital speed: 17.47 km/s
- Mean anomaly: 170.00°
- Mean motion: 0° 11^{m} 55.392^{s} / day
- Inclination: 12.413°
- Longitude of ascending node: 183.89°
- Argument of perihelion: 210.750°

Physical characteristics
- Mean diameter: 144.90±2.21 km (composite estimate); 148.49±3.6 km
- Mass: (2.38±0.19)×10^{18} kg (Note: Calculated from its standard gravitational parameter GM = 0.159±0.013 km^{3}/s^{2}.)
- Mean density: 1.21 g/cm^{3} (Note: Assuming a diameter of 156 km.)
- Synodic rotation period: 8.8749 h (0.36979 d)
- Geometric albedo: 0.0428±0.002
- Spectral type: C
- Absolute magnitude (H): 8.18

238 Hypatia is a large main-belt asteroid that was discovered by Russian astronomer Viktor Knorre on July 1, 1884, in Berlin. It was the third of his four asteroid discoveries. The name was given in honour of philosopher Hypatia of Alexandria. Based upon the spectrum, it is classified as a C-type asteroid and is probably composed of primitive carbonaceous material. Like many asteroids of this type, its surface is very dark in colour.

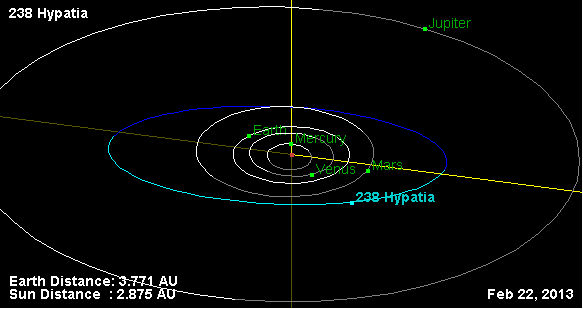
Orbit of Hypatia (blue ring)

Photometric observations of this asteroid at the European Southern Observatory in 1981 gave a light curve with a period of 8.9 ± 0.1 hours and a brightness variation of 0.12 in magnitude. Stellar occultation events were observed for this asteroid during 2001 and 2005. The resulting chords provided cross-section diameter estimates of 146.5 and 145.3 km, respectively.
