= Hypatia (crater) =

Crater on the Moon

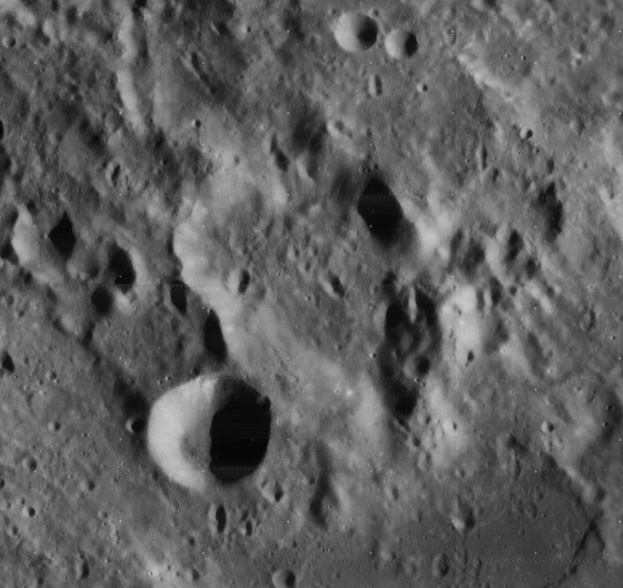
- Lunar Orbiter 4 image
- Coordinates: 4.3°S 22.6°E
- Diameter: 41 × 28 km
- Depth: 1.4 km
- Colongitude: 338° at sunrise
- Eponym: Hypatia of Alexandria

Hypatia is a lunar impact crater along the northwest edge of Sinus Asperitatis, a bay on the southwest edge of Mare Tranquillitatis. It was named after Egyptian mathematician Hypatia of Alexandria. The nearest crater with an eponym is Alfraganus to the west-southwest. However, farther to the south-southeast, across the lunar mare, is the prominent crater Theophilus.

Hypatia is an asymmetrical formation with a rugged, irregular outer rim cut through in several places by narrow clefts. It is generally longer along an axis running to the north-northwest, with the widest outward bulge occurring on the west side at the northern end. It resembles a merger of several crater formations with a common interior floor. Attached to the exterior rim along the southwest is the satellite crater Hypatia A, a more symmetrical, bowl-shaped crater.

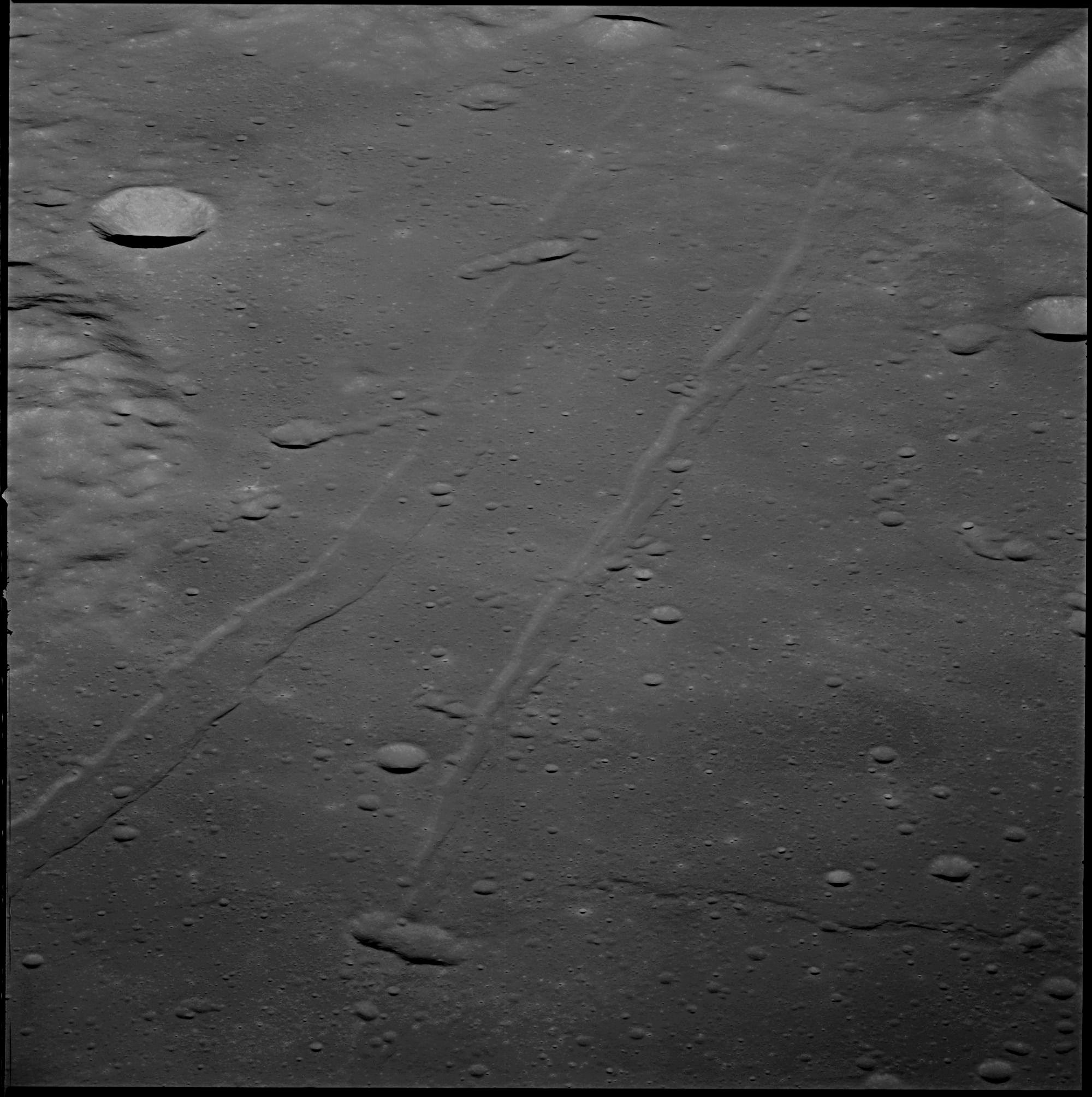
Western Rimae Hypatia (Apollo 10 photo)

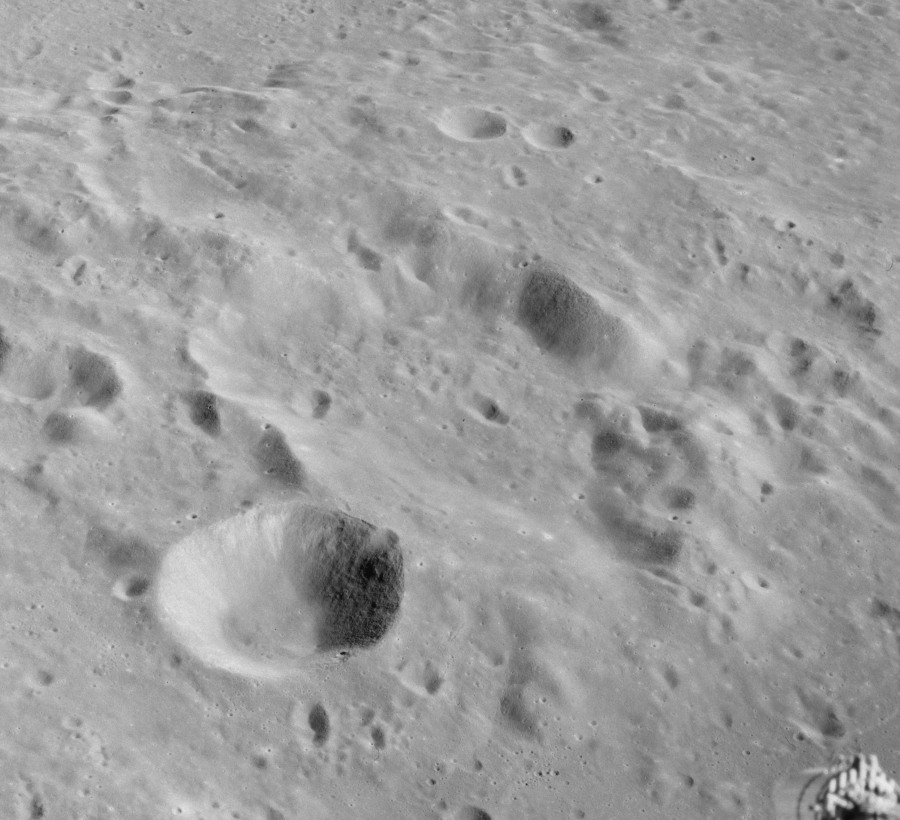
Oblique view of Hypatia from Apollo 16

== Rimae Hypatia ==
About 70 kilometers (43 mi) to the north of Hypatia is a system of linear rilles designated Rimae Hypatia, running about 180 kilometers (110 mi) across the Mare Tranquillitatis, and generally following a course to the south-southeast. The part of the rilles close to the crater Moltke was informally called U.S. Highway 1 by the Apollo 10 and Apollo 11 crews.

== Satellite craters ==
By convention, these features are identified on lunar maps by placing the letter on the side of the crater midpoint closest to Hypatia.

Hypatia	Latitude	Longitude	Diameter
A	4.9° S	22.2° E	16 km
B	4.6° S	21.3° E	5 km
C	0.9° S	20.8° E	15 km
D	3.1° S	22.7° E	6 km
E	0.3° S	20.4° E	6 km
F	4.1° S	21.5° E	8 km
G	2.7° S	23.0° E	5 km
H	4.5° S	24.1° E	5 km
M	5.3° S	23.4° E	28 km
R	1.9° S	21.2° E	4 km
