= Hypatia (novel) =

1853 novel by Charles Kingsley

Hypatia, or New Foes with an Old Face
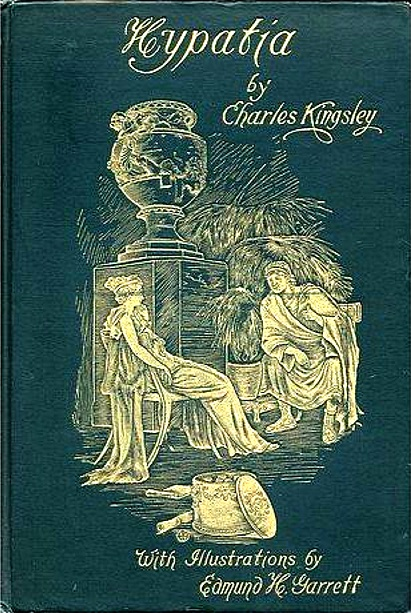
- 1897 edition illustrated by Edmund H. Garrett
- Author: Charles Kingsley
- Language: English
- Publication date: 1853
- Publication place: United Kingdom

Hypatia, or New Foes with an Old Face is an 1853 novel by the English writer Charles Kingsley. It is a fictionalised account of the life of the philosopher Hypatia, and tells the story of a young monk called Philammon who travels to Alexandria, where he becomes mixed up in the political and religious battles of the day. Intended as Christian apologia, it reflects typical 19th-century religious sentiments of the day. For many years the book was considered one of Kingsley's best novels and was widely read.

== Plot ==
The plot revolves around Hypatia, the pagan philosopher; Cyril, the Christian patriarch; Orestes, the power-hungry prefect of Egypt; and Philammon, an Egyptian monk. Philammon travels from his monastic community in the desert to Alexandria, and expresses a desire to attend Hypatia's lectures despite Cyril's dislike of Hypatia. Although Hypatia has a deep-seated hatred of Christianity, Philammon becomes her devoted friend and disciple. Philammon also encounters Pelagia, his long-lost sister, a former singer and dancer who is now married to a Gothic warrior. Philammon naturally desires to convert both women to Christianity. The plot is played out against the backdrop of Orestes' scheming to become emperor of Egypt and Africa; he uses Hypatia as a pawn. A subplot involves Raphael Aben-Ezra, a wealthy Jewish associate of Hypatia who falls in love with a Christian girl called Victoria and converts to win her love. A series of events, some of which are orchestrated by a Jewish woman called Miriam, raise tensions between the prefect and the church. Hypatia undergoes a spiritual crisis and comes close to being converted to Christianity by Raphael. Before this can happen, however, rumours are spread that Hypatia is the cause of unrest in the city and she is murdered by a Christian mob. Philammon, despondent, returns to the desert where he eventually becomes abbot of his monastery, albeit with a more worldly view of Christianity.

== Themes ==
Hypatia has a strong anti-Catholic tone which reflects Kingsley's own dislike of priests and monks. Kingsley's portrayal of a fractious and corrupt early Church represented by Cyril and the clergy is intended to reflect the 19th-century Catholic church. Kingsley also disliked priestly celibacy, and makes it clear that, in his view, it damages those who practise it. He was, nevertheless, keen to assert the moral superiority of Christianity over Judaism: of the two Jewish characters in the novel, one – Miriam – is consistently malevolent, and the other – Raphael – abandons his home to become a disillusioned wandering Jew before converting to Christianity. The portrayal of Greco-Roman paganism in the novel is likewise negative: thus when Orestes attempts a pagan revival in Alexandria, he does so by restoring the spectacle and butchery of the gladiatorial arena. Kingsley also devotes parts of the novel to expounding Neoplatonism and explaining its apparent flaws.

Kingsley expresses a view of the superiority of northern Europeans in his portrayal of the Goths in Alexandria as saviours of Christianity, who, although crude and violent, possess the necessary Teutonic values of hardiness and virility to counter the corrupt church. This reflects a theme which Kingsley would later expound in a book and lecture series entitled The Roman and the Teuton.

A further theme is the way Kingsley links religious insight with eroticism, a theme which is most overtly displayed in the climax of the novel with Hypatia stripped naked, being torn apart by monks under an enormous image of Christ.

== Publication ==
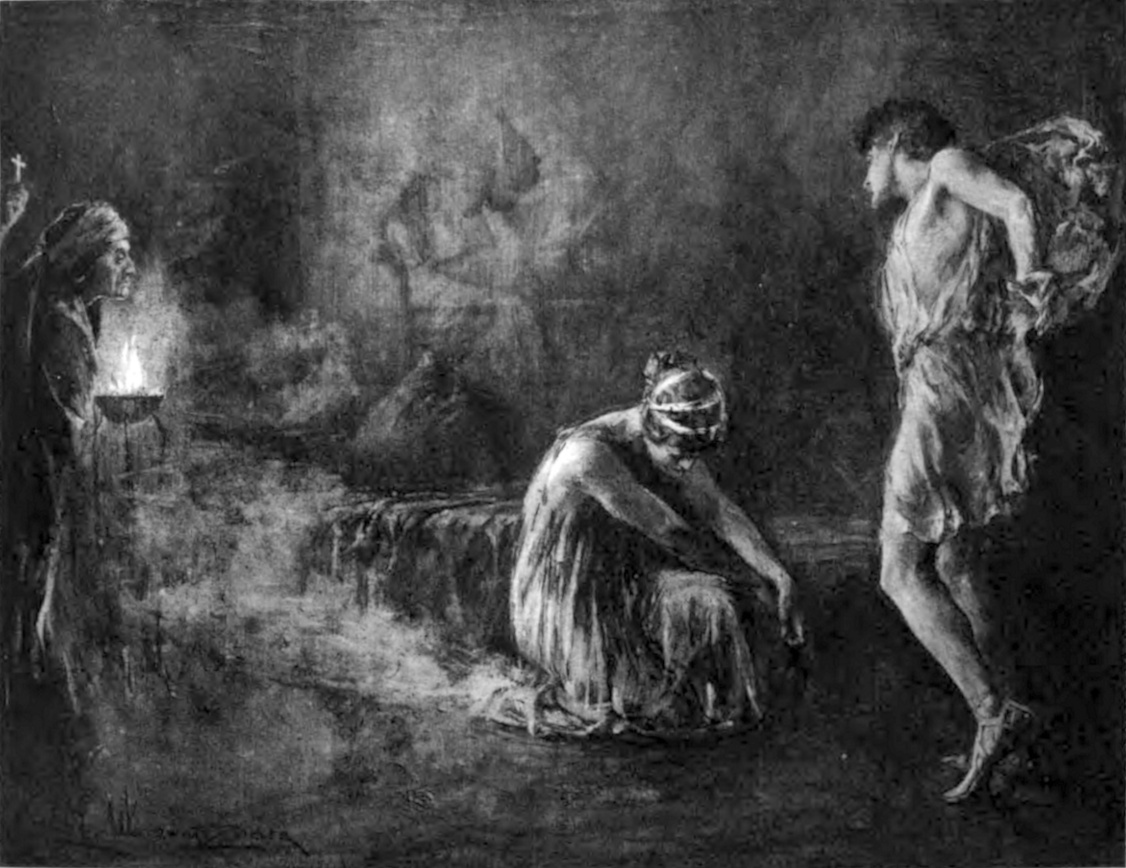
Hypatia at the feet of Philammon. Drawn by Lee Woodward Zeigler, 1899

Hypatia was originally serialised in 1852 in Fraser's Magazine from January 1852 to April 1853, and it was then published in book form in 1853. The book was translated into several European languages, and it was very successful in Germany.

There have been several illustrated editions of the novel, including one with copious illustrations by William Martin Johnson; a second with seventeen illustrations by Edmund H. Garrett; a third with twelve illustrations by Lee Woodward Zeigler; and a fourth with eight illustrations by Byam Shaw. A German edition had illustrations by Rudolf Trache, and an early Spanish edition had seven illustrations by Ramón Alabern and other artists.

== Reaction ==
For many years Hypatia was regarded as Kingsley's "most widely known and appreciated" novel, with interest only dipping in later generations. The book was said to have been Queen Victoria's favourite novel by Kingsley.

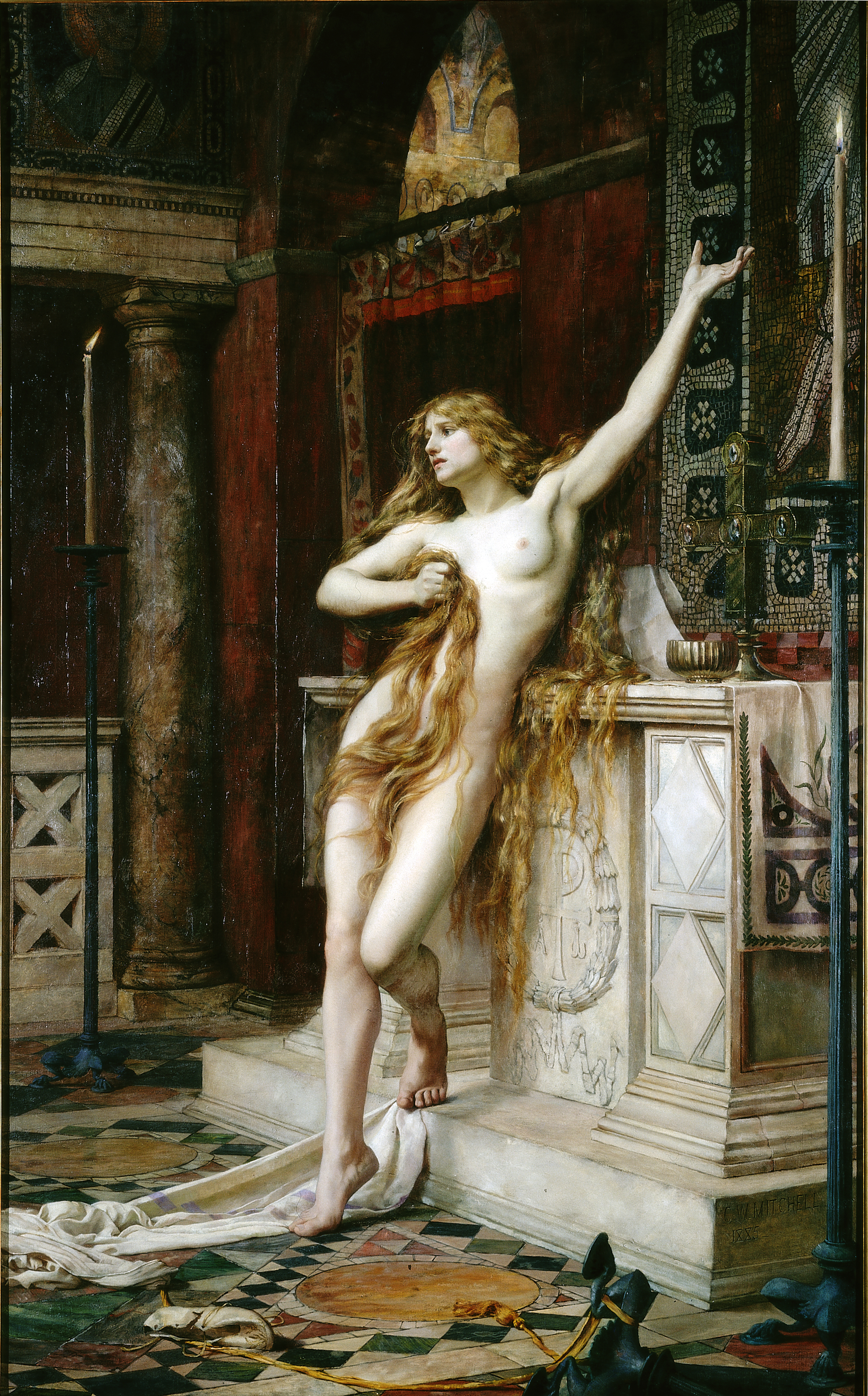
Hypatia (1885) by Charles William Mitchell, believed to be a depiction of a scene in Charles Kingsley's novel Hypatia

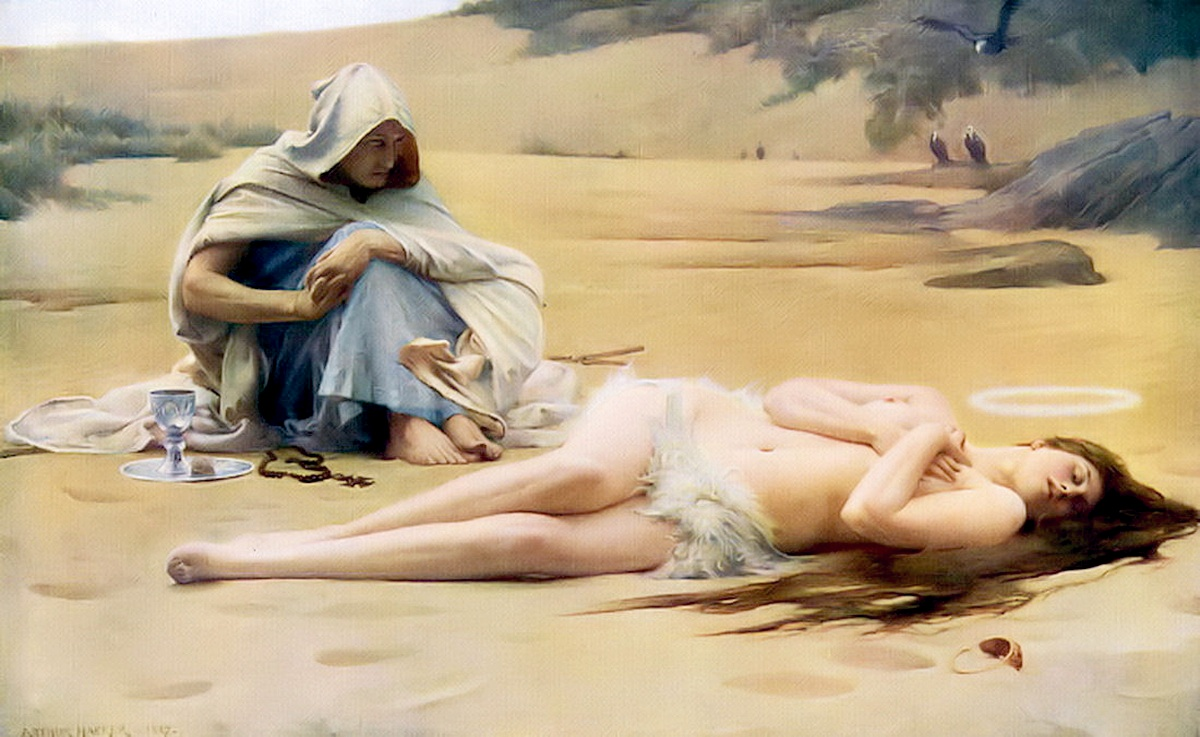
Pelagia and Philammon (1887) by Arthur Hacker

The novel notably inspired the painting Hypatia by Charles William Mitchell (1885, Laing Art Gallery, Newcastle) which depicts Hypatia, naked, cowering against an altar, facing her (unseen) murderers. Another painting inspired by the novel was Arthur Hacker's Pelagia and Philammon (1887, Walker Art Gallery, Liverpool) which depicts a naked Pelagia dying, watched by a cloaked, hooded Philammon.

In Kingsley's era criticism of the novel was directed at his negative portrayal of the church in Alexandria and of Cyril in particular. It was this aspect of the novel, as well as its alleged indecency, which thwarted an attempt to bestow an honorary degree at Oxford University on Kingsley in 1863. In addition, some readers were disappointed that Kingsley did not go further in villainising all creeds other than Christianity. The anti-Catholic theme of the novel naturally drew criticism from Catholic churchmen, and among the literary responses were novels by Cardinal Nicholas Wiseman, Fabiola (1854), and John Henry Newman, Callista (1855).

In the modern era criticism of the novel has focused on its anti-Semitism as well as its racial prejudice. The book has been described as "ferociously racist". One review describes it as "Christian apologia, [with] religious and ethnic bigotry in the form of anti-Semitism and anti-Catholicism", but nevertheless concludes that "it is an unexpectedly involving novel, and is well worth searching out." Another review criticises the novel for being "difficult to follow with the myriad of unnecessary characters and their convoluted esoteric arguments", but concludes that "Hypatia stands as an excellent example of fiction written for a specific purpose, as well as an impeccably researched novel that remains true to history."

== Adaptations ==
In 1859 a play based on the novel entitled The Black Agate, or, Old foes with new faces was performed at the Academy of Music in Philadelphia. The play was written by Elizabeth Bowers, who also played the part of Hypatia. A more notable adaptation of the novel to the stage was G. Stuart Ogilvie's Hypatia, which opened at the Haymarket Theatre in London on 2 January 1893. It was produced by Herbert Beerbohm Tree. Julia Neilson played the character of Hypatia, and her husband Fred Terry played Philammon. The play featured an elaborate musical score written by the composer Hubert Parry. Ogilvie's play introduced a scheming Jewish character called Issachar (played by Tree) in place of Kingsley's Miriam. The portrayal of Issachar was relatively sympathetic, as Tree had great respect for the Jewish contribution to contemporary theatre. Even The Jewish Chronicle noted that Issachar is "ambitious and able, he plots and counterplots but there is no suspicion or meanness in his nature" and concluded that he was the "least conventional and least offensive of recent stage Jews".
