= 16th Irish Film & Television Awards =

Annual Irish media awards ceremony

- Date: 18 October 2020
- Site: Online "virtual ceremony"
- Hosted by: Deirdre O'Kane

Highlights
- Best Film: Ordinary Love and Black ’47
- Best Direction: Paddy Breathnach; Rosie
- Best Actor: Tom Vaughan-Lawlor; Rialto
- Best Actress: Jessie Buckley; Wild Rose
- Most awards: Several works won 2 awards
- Most nominations: Arracht (11)

Television coverage
- Channel: Virgin Media One

The 16th Irish Film & Television Academy Awards took place on 18 October 2020. Because no ceremony was held in 2019, this ceremony honoured films and television drama released in both 2018 and 2019. Due to the COVID-19 pandemic, no physical ceremony took place; instead, there was a "virtual ceremony" hosted by Deirdre O’Kane.

The nominations for the IFTAs were announced by the Irish Film and Television Academy on 14 July 2020. People presenting awards included President Michael D. Higgins, Martin Scorsese, Daisy Ridley and Liam Neeson. It aired on Virgin Media One.

Below are the winners and nominees. Winners are at the top of each list, in bold type.

== Film ==
=== Best film (2019) ===
Films released in 2018.

- **Black ’47**
- Float Like a Butterfly
- Rosie
- The Dig
- The Hole in the Ground

=== Best film (2020) ===
Films released in 2019. (Arracht went on general release in 2020, but it premiered at a festival in 2019.)

- **Ordinary Love**
- A Bump Along the Way
- Arracht
- Calm with Horses
- Extra Ordinary

=== Director ===
- **Paddy Breathnach – Rosie**
- Nora Twomey – The Breadwinner
- Lance Daly – Black ’47
- Tomás Ó Súilleabháin – Arracht
- Mike Ahern and Enda Loughman – Extra Ordinary
- Lee Cronin – The Hole in the Ground
- Lisa Barros D'Sa and Glenn Leyburn – Ordinary Love

=== Script ===
- **Mark O'Halloran – Rialto**
- Roddy Doyle – Rosie
- Owen McCafferty – Ordinary Love
- Joe Murtagh – Calm with Horses
- Tomás Ó Súilleabháin – Arracht
- Carmel Winters – Float Like a Butterfly

=== Actress in a leading role ===
- **Jessie Buckley – Wild Rose**
- Aisling Franciosi – The Nightingale
- Bronagh Gallagher – A Bump Along The Way
- Sarah Greene – Rosie
- Seána Kerslake – The Hole in the Ground
- Saoirse Ronan – Little Women

=== Actor in a leading role ===
- **Tom Vaughan-Lawlor – Rialto**
- Dara Devaney – Finky
- Moe Dunford – The Dig
- Liam Neeson – Ordinary Love
- Dónall Ó Héalaí – Arracht
- Barry Ward – Extra Ordinary

=== Actress in a supporting role ===
- **Niamh Algar – Calm With Horses**
- Caitriona Balfe – Le Mans '66 (Ford v Ferrari)
- Seána Kerslake – Dublin Oldschool
- Charlie Murphy – Dark Lies the Island
- Emily Taaffe – The Dig
- Catherine Walker – We Ourselves

=== Actor in a supporting role ===
- **David Wilmot – Ordinary Love**
- Lorcan Cranitch – The Dig
- Dara Devaney – Arracht
- Barry Keoghan – Calm With Horses
- Ian Lloyd Anderson – Dublin Oldschool
- Stephen Rea – Black ’47

=== George Morrison Feature Documentary ===
- **The Lonely Battle of Thomas Reid**
- Gaza
- I, Dolours
- Katie
- The Image You Missed
- When All is Ruin Once Again

=== Short film – Live action ===
- **Welcome To A Bright White Limbo**
- Bainne
- Ciúnas (Silence)
- Detainment
- El Hor
- Here’s Looking at you Kid!
- Inhale
- Sister This
- The Grass Ceiling
- The Vasectomy Doctor

=== Animated short ===
- **The Dream Report**
- Outside the Box
- Streets of Fury
- The Bird & the Whale
- The Overcoat

=== Irish Film Board Rising Star Award ===
- **Aisling Franciosi (Actor — Black Narcissus, Home, The Nightingale)**
  - Niamh Algar (Actor — Calm with Horses, The Last Right, Pure, The Virtues)
  - Lee Cronin (Director/Writer — Ghost Train, The Hole in the Ground)
  - Andy Tohill & Ryan Tohill (Directors — The Dig, The Survivalist)

== Television drama ==
=== Drama ===
- **Blood (Channel 5 / Virgin Media One)**
- Death and Nightingales (RTÉ / BBC)
- Dublin Murders (RTÉ / BBC)
- Vikings (History [Canada])

=== Director ===
- **Dearbhla Walsh – The Handmaid’s Tale**
- Anthony Byrne – Peaky Blinders
- John Hayes – Dublin Murders
- Lisa Mulcahy – Blood
- Hannah Quinn – Blood
- Aisling Walsh – Elizabeth Is Missing

=== Script ===
- **Mark O'Rowe – Temple**
- Ronan Bennett – Top Boy
- Daragh Carville – The Bay
- Mark O'Connor – Darklands

=== Actress in a leading role ===
- **Niamh Algar – The Virtues**
- Caitriona Balfe – Outlander
- Jessie Buckley – The Woman in White
- Sarah Greene – Dublin Murders
- Ruth Negga – Preacher
- Ann Skelly – Death and Nightingales

=== Actor in a leading role ===
- **Andrew Scott – Black Mirror ("Smithereens")**
- Richard Dormer – Fortitude
- Adrian Dunbar – Line Of Duty
- Brendan Gleeson – Mr. Mercedes
- Cillian Murphy – Peaky Blinders
- Chris O'Dowd – Get Shorty

=== Actress in a supporting role ===
- **Jessie Buckley – Chernobyl**
- Niamh Algar – Pure
- Helen Behan – The Virtues
- Ruth Bradley – Guilt
- Ingrid Craigie – Blood
- Fiona Shaw – Killing Eve

=== Actor in a supporting role ===
- **Mark O'Halloran – The Virtues**
- Liam Cunningham – Game of Thrones
- Barry Keoghan – Chernobyl
- Owen McDonnell – Killing Eve
- Cillian O’Gairbhi – Blood
- Tom Vaughan-Lawlor – Dublin Murders

== Craft ==
=== Original music ===
- **KÍLA – Arracht**
- Stephen McKeon – The Hole in the Ground
- Stephen Rennicks – The Little Stranger
- Brian Byrne – Black ’47
- Ray Harman – Blood
- Stephen Rennicks – Rosie

=== Editing ===
- **Mick Mahon – Gaza**
- Colin Campbell – The Hole in the Ground
- Dermot Diskin – Never Grow Old
- Michael Harte – Three Identical Strangers
- Tony Kearns – Black Mirror: Bandersnatch
- Úna Ní Dhonghaíle – Rosie

=== Production Design ===
- **John Leslie – Never Grow Old**
- Tom Conroy – The Rhythm Section
- Damien Creagh – Calm With Horses
- Conor Dennison – The Hole in the Ground
- Padraig O’Neil – Arracht
- Anna Rackard – The Trial of Christine Keeler

=== Cinematography ===
- **Piers McGrail – Never Grow Old**
- Tom Comerford – The Hole in the Ground
- Andrew McConnel – Gaza
- Kate McCullough – Arracht
- Robbie Ryan – Marriage Story
- Cathal Watters – Rosie

=== Costume Design ===
- **Eimer Ní Mhaoldomhnaigh – The Rhythm Section**
- Joan Bergin – The Catcher was a Spy
- Clodagh Deegan – Arracht
- Triona Lillis – Float Like A Butterfly
- Susan O’Connor Cave – Vikings
- Louise Stanton – Rosie

=== Makeup & Hair ===
- **Linda Gannon & Liz Byrne – Black ’47**
- Niamh O’Loan – Arracht
- Louise Myler – Finky
- Polly McKay – Ordinary Love
- Dee Corcoran & Tom McInerney – Vikings
- Eileen Buggy & Jennifer Hegarty – Vita & Virginia

=== Sound ===
- **Brendan Rehill, Alan Scully and Peter Blayney – Arracht**
- Fionáin Higgins & Robert Flanagan – Black ’47
- Ronan Hill, Danny Crowley & Simon Kerr – Game of Thrones
- Aza Hand, Karen O’Mahony and Patrick Drummond – Never Grow Old
- Hugh Fox & Niall Brady – Rosie
- Steve Fanagan & Niall Brady – The Little Stranger

=== VFX ===
- **Ed Bruce and Nicholas Murphy – We Have Always Lived in the Castle**
- Jim O’Hagan and Ronan Gantly – Game of Thrones
- Ed Bruce – The Favourite
- Ed Bruce and Jim O’Hagan – The Irishman
