= Where the Indus is Young =

Travel book by Dervla Murphy

Where the Indus Is Young: A Winter in Baltistan
- Cover of John Murray first edition (1977)
- Author: Dervla Murphy
- Publisher: John Murray
- Publication date: 1977
- Pages: 266 (first edition)
- ISBN: 071953335X
- Dewey Decimal: 915.49/13
- Preceded by: On a Shoestring to Coorg
- Followed by: A Place Apart

Where the Indus Is Young is a book by Irish author Dervla Murphy. It was first published by John Murray in 1977. The book is usually given the subtitle A winter in Baltistan, but has been called Midwinter in Baltistan.

== Summary ==
Where the Indus Is Young is the second book in which Murphy describes a journey with her then six-year-old daughter Rachel. The pair trek through the Karakorum Mountains, close to Pakistan's disputed border with Kashmir, in the cold heart of winter. They follow the gorge formed by the Indus River, and lodge with locals.

In her review Nightmare Trip, Jan Morris described it as "The most appallingly fascinating travel book that I have ever read."

== Publication history ==
The book was first published in 1977. Like Murphy's other earlier works, it was published by Jock Murray of the John Murray publishing house. When Jock died and his publishing house was sold, Murphy moved to Eland Books, who republished the book in 2011.
