= The Waiting Land =

Travel book by Dervla Murphy

The Waiting Land: A Spell in Nepal
- Cover of John Murray first edition (1967)
- Author: Dervla Murphy
- Publisher: John Murray
- Publication date: 1967
- Pages: 216 (first edition)
- Dewey Decimal: 915.496
- Preceded by: Tibetan Foothold
- Followed by: In Ethiopia with a Mule

The Waiting Land is a book by Irish author Dervla Murphy. It was first published by John Murray in 1967 and has been described as one of the top ten books about the Himalayas.

== Summary ==
The Waiting Land is the third in a trilogy of books, following Full Tilt and Tibetan Foothold. It describes Murphy's involvement with the self-sufficient mountain cultures of the Himalayas. Lured by the chance to work again with Tibetan refugees in the Pokhara Valley, Murphy moves into a tiny room above a stall in a bazaar. There she falls under the spell of Nepal and its ancient roots. The book culminates with a trek to the remote Langtang region on the border with Tibet.

== Publication history ==
- 1967: John Murray, 216pp
- 1986: ISIS Large Print, 312pp, ISBN 185089132X
- 1987: Century, 216pp, ISBN 0712619283
- 1990: Arrow, 216pp, ISBN 0099762404
- 1998: Flamingo, 216pp, ISBN 0006550908
- 2011: Eland Books, 216pp, ISBN 9781906011659
