= Dónall Ó Héalaí =

Irish actor and voice actor (born 1987)

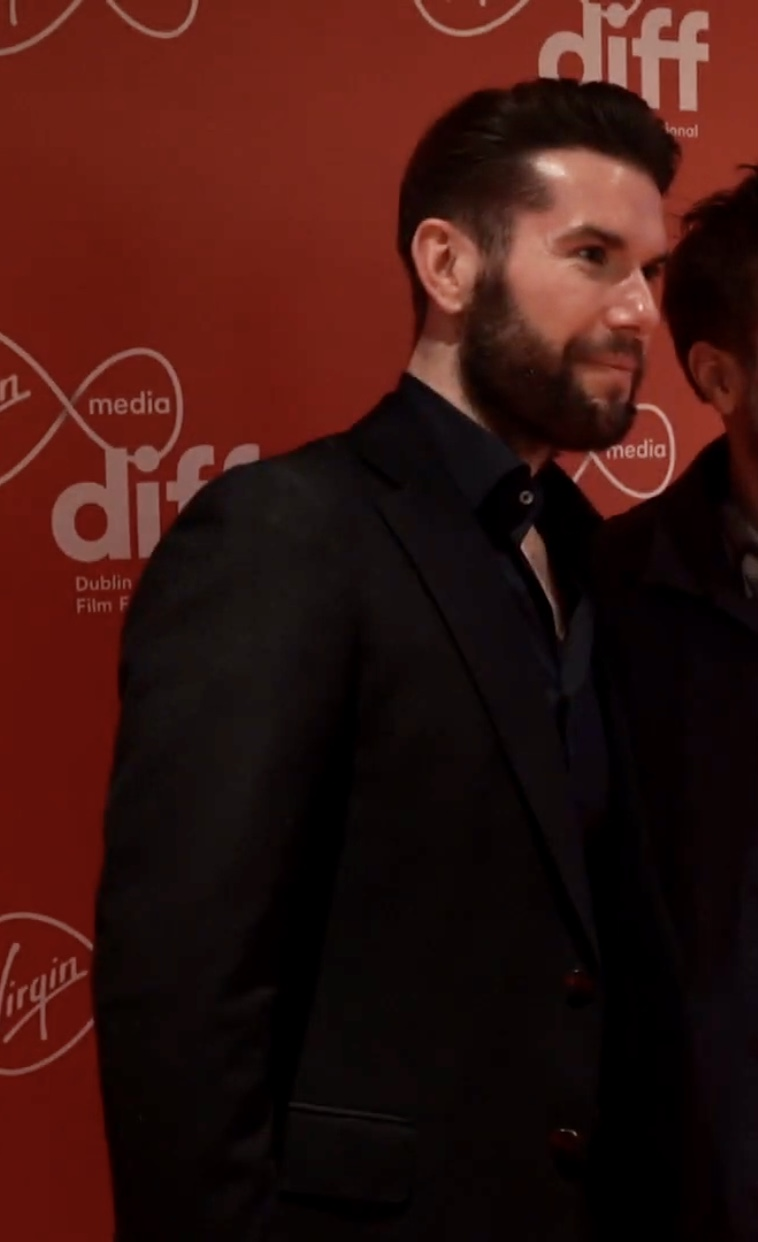
- Ó Héalaí at the 2020 Dublin International Film Festival
- Born: 5 March 1987 (age 39); Inverin, County Galway, Ireland
- Education: Maynooth University; Stella Adler Studio of Acting; Bow Street Academy
- Occupation: Actor
- Years active: 2006–present
- Agent: Curtis Brown

Dónall Ó Héalaí (Irish: [ˈd̪ˠoːnˠəl̪ˠ oː ˈheːlˠiː]) (born 5 March 1987) is an Irish actor and voice actor. He was named a 2020 Screen International Star of Tomorrow and twice nominated for best leading actor in film at the Irish Film and Television awards in 2020 and 2022. He was also the recipient of the Wilde Card award at the Oscar Wilde awards in Los Angeles in 2022 as well as one to watch in 2021 by The Irish Examiner.

== Early life and education ==
Ó Héalai was born in the Gaeltacht village of Inverin, County Galway and grew up in Inverin and Spiddal. He began acting at the age of 14 at a local youth club. He completed his secondary education as a boarding student at St Jarlath's College in Tuam.

He graduated from Maynooth University. He was awarded the Dr. H.H Stewart Literary Prize during his studies. He then trained at the Stella Adler Studio of Acting in New York and Bow Street Academy in Dublin.

== Career ==
In 2006, Ó Héalai made his onscreen debut as a teenager in the recurring role of Jeaic in season 1 of the TG4 coming-of-age family series Aifric.

Ó Héalai played Otis in the 2019 American psychological thriller Impossible Monsters. That same year, he starred as Colmán Sharkey in the Irish-language period drama film Arracht, which won Best Irish film at 2020 Dublin International Film Festival (DIFF) and the Audience Award at the 2020 Glasgow Film Festival. In addition to receiving critical acclaim, Ó Héalai won the Aer Lingus Discovery Award at the DIFF as well as receiving a Best Actor nomination at the IFTAs.

Ó Héalaí stars as John Cunliffe in the Irish-language film Foscadh, an adaptation of the social novel The Thing About December by Donal Ryan. Foscadh is the Irish submission for Best International Feature Film at the 94th Academy Awards.

== Filmography ==
=== Film ===
Year	Title	Role	Notes
2012	Skint	Billy	Short film
2014	Sínte	Seán	Short film
2015	My Name is Emily	Young Policeman	
2015	Pursuit	Oisín	
2015	Traders	Kicker	
2016	Catch 22	Mikey	
2017	Loud Places	Garrett	
2019	Impossible Monsters	Otis	
2019	Arracht	Colmán Sharkey	
2021	Foscadh	John Cunliffe	
TBA	Landlines	James	Filming

=== Television ===
Year	Title	Role	Notes
2006	Aifric	Jeaic	5 episodes
2010–2011	Seacht	Quinn	3 episodes
2013	The Siege 1922	Various	Television film
2011–2014	Corp & Anam	John Glynn / Garda Óg	3 episodes
2022	North Sea Connections	Shane McDonagh	Television drama
2024	Crá	Garda Conall Ó Súilleabháin	
2026	The Punisher: One Last Kill	Mickey	Television special

=== Video games ===
Year	Title	Role	Notes
2018	Red Dead Redemption 2	O'Driscolls	

=== Music videos ===
Song	Year	Artist	Notes
"All the Others"	2014	The Coronas	

== Awards and nominations ==
Year	Award	Category	Work	Result	Ref
2015	Irish Screen America	Rising Star Award	Sínte	Won	
2020	Dublin International Film Festival	Aer Lingus Discovery Award	Arracht	Won	
2020	Irish Film & Television Awards	Actor in a Leading Role – Film	Arracht	Nominated	
