= Bow Street Academy =

Acting Academy in Dublin

Coordinates: 53.348156°N 6.276475°W

Bow Street
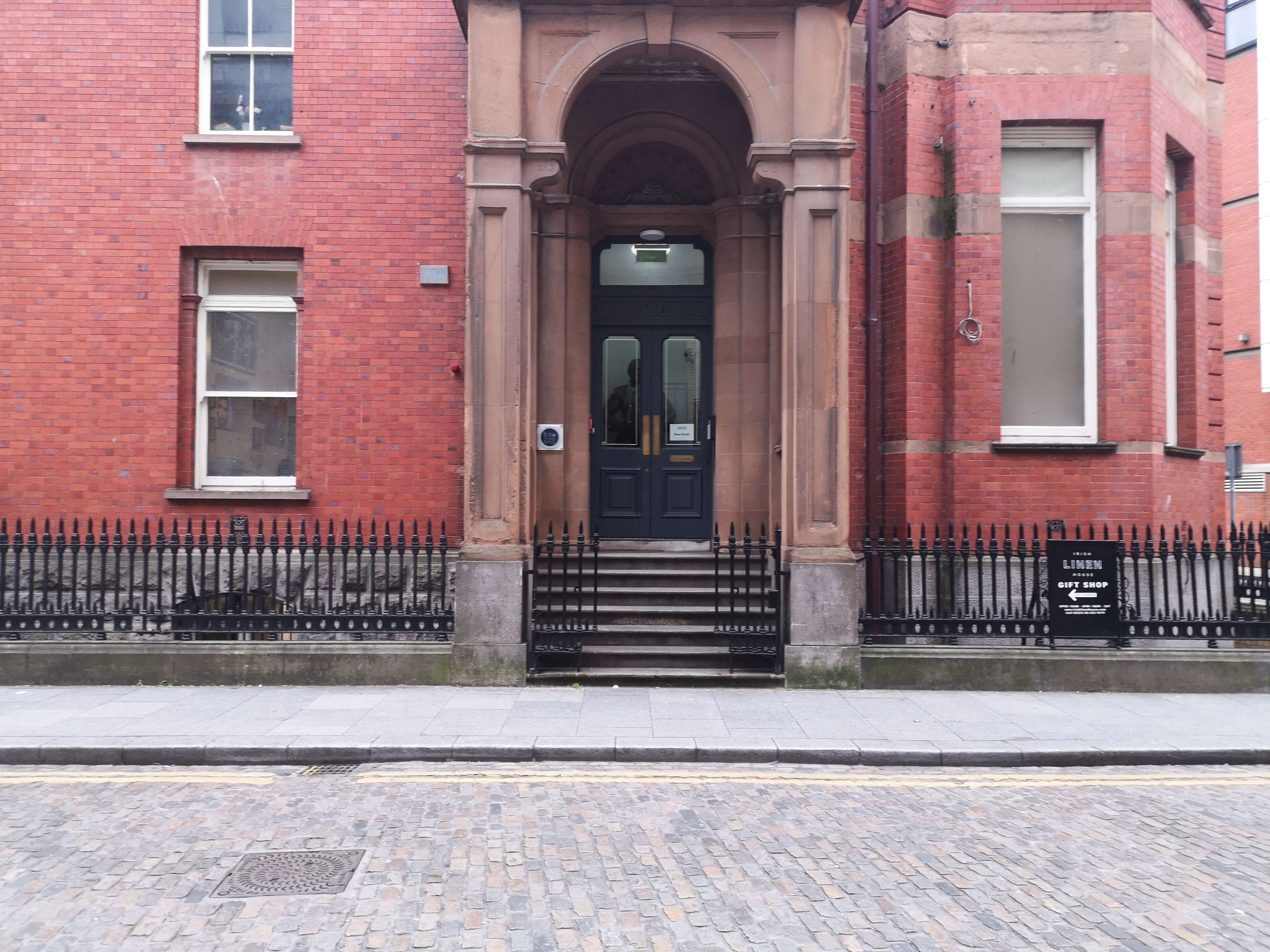
- Facade of Bow Street Academy, in Smithfield, Dublin.
- Former name: The Factory
- Type: Screen Acting School
- Established: 2013; 13 years ago
- Founders: Gerry Grennell; Shimmy Marcus
- Affiliations: Screen Training Ireland; Screen Skills Ireland
- Director: Shimmy Marcus
- Location: Bow Street, Dublin, Ireland
- Campus: Urban
- Website: www.bowstreet.ie

Bow Street Academy — the National Screen Acting School of Ireland (known simply as Bow Street) is a film and television acting academy in Dublin, Ireland. Named after its location on the road that was once home to the original Jameson whisky distillery, graduates of its Full Time Programme include Niamh Algar, Ann Skelly, Leah McNamara, Niamh McCormack, Dónall Ó Héalai and Laurence O’Fuairan

== History ==
The school was originally known as The Factory when it was based in Dublin's docklands. Students at that time included Barry Keoghan, Jack Reynor, Brian Gleeson and Louisa Harland.

In 2012 Ireland's first full time screen acting course was launched called The Programme for Screen Acting, but when Google bought the building in 2014 the Factory's lease was not renewed and they moved across the city and rebranded as Bow Street Academy.

Here the school expanded, adding custom modules and courses including the 6 month Part-Time Screen Acting Course.

At its launch, filmmaker Jim Sheridan said "I'm delighted to see The Factory evolve into Bow Street Academy for Screen Acting. I've seen first hand the extraordinary calibre of actors coming through its programme for screen acting – both in class and on set. This building and this dream needs to be supported by us all."

Collaborations and partnerships with organisations include Screen Ireland, and Spotlight UK.

== Courses ==
Later Bow Street launched ‘The Actor as Creator’, Ireland's first funding scheme for actors in partnership with Ireland's national screen agency, Screen Ireland with the support of Equity. The scheme allows 30 actors per round to make their own short films. Many of these films have now become international award winners.

The school offers a range of programs, masterclasses and courses including the web series ‘Bow Street Meets’ featuring interviews with Oscar Isaac, Saoirse Ronan, Andrew Garfield, Fiona Shaw, Brendan Gleeson, Richard E. Grant, Domhnall Gleeson, Hugo Weaving, Richard Dreyfus, Lenny Abrahamson, and Leo Davis.

== Notable alumni ==
- Niamh Algar - (The Virtues, Raised by Wolves))
- Jordanne Jones
- Jade Jordan
- Seana Kerslake - (Can't Cope, Won't Cope, The Hole in the Ground)
- Barry Keoghan
- Niamh McCormack
- Nika McGuigan - (Can't Cope Won't Cope)
- Leah McNamara - (Dublin Murders, Normal People)
- Dónall Ó Héalai - (Arracht)
- Nathan O'Toole
- Ann Skelly
- Peter Claffey
