= A Place Apart (Murphy book) =

Travel book by Dervla Murphy

A Place Apart: Northern Ireland in the 1970s
- Cover of John Murray first edition (1978)
- Author: Dervla Murphy
- Publisher: John Murray
- Publication date: 1978
- Pages: 290 (first edition)
- Awards: Christopher Ewart-Biggs Memorial Prize
- ISBN: 0719536499
- Dewey Decimal: 941.6082/4/0924
- Preceded by: On a Shoestring to Coorg
- Followed by: Wheels within Wheels

A Place Apart is a book by Irish author Dervla Murphy. It was first published by John Murray in 1978, and won the Christopher Ewart-Biggs Memorial Prize in 1979. The book is usually given the subtitle Northern Ireland in the 1970s, but has been called A Record of Northern Ireland.

== Summary ==
In A Place Apart, Murphy travelled by bicycle to Northern Ireland during the height of The Troubles. She tried to understand the situation by speaking to people from both the Catholic and Protestant side of the divide. Despite her own family connections to the IRA, Murphy travelled north unfettered by sectarian loyalties. She describes her own religious beliefs as

I suppose I am now an agnostic humanist, though I don’t much like the clinical sound of that. Nor am I sure of its accuracy, unless the word humanism may be restricted to just one of its dictionary meanings - “doctrine emphasising the importance of common human needs and abstention from profitless theorising” [e.g., breakfast-time discussions about Transubstantiation, Predestination and so forth]. And unless the agnosticism leaves me free to believe - or at least to feel that I would like to believe - in some immaterial influence pervading the universe and entitled to reverence. I have an ineradicable respect for all the great religions and even for some of the little cranky ones, trying though these can be.

— p.15

A Place Apart was the first book in which Murphy probed geopolitical developments alongside travel commentary. She includes a plea for the abandonment of Articles 2 and 3 of the Constitution of Ireland which, at the time of writing, strove to make the Island of Ireland one national territory. Murphy herself, however, identifies a later 1981 book on the nuclear arms industry, Race to the Finish?, as the turning point in the politicisation of her writing style.

The book includes a disputed account of Bloody Sunday:

The Bloody Sunday myth has become so valuable a weapon against the Brits that anyone seeking to blunt its cutting edge will not be popular. Indisputablly, none of the thirteen civilians shot dead by British paratroopers in Derry was handling a gun or bomb when shot. Equally indisputably - and by now this is common knowledge - the Provos had made a careful plan to attack the William Street barrricade; two senior volunteers were armed and waiting in a house to shoot at the army; and the paratroopers saw an armed group racing out of Glenfaddagh Park, where the Provos had parked a car containing guns. The “myth” versions of the tragedy does not includes these details. If the Provos wanted to make sure that no innocent civilians were shot during that illegal march they should have kept themselves and their weapons out of the way.

— p.73

Later in the book, Murphy covers the assassination of Christopher Ewart-Biggs, British Ambassador to the Republic:

Among extremists of both communities disappointment was frequently revealed at the failure of the assassination to damage Anglo-Irish relations. There was an almost childish sulkiness involved. Catholics commented sourly that after the grovelling public speeches of various Irish cabinet ministers [...] the “Free State” might as well rejoin the UK. And Loyalists commented, equally sourly, that Britain had lost a wonderful opportunity to show the world what she really thought of those Fenian bastards.

— pp.183-84

A Place Apart would go on to win the Christopher Ewart-Biggs Memorial Prize in 1979, awarded to books that promote peace and reconciliation in Ireland.

== Publication history ==
The book was first published in 1978. Like Murphy's other earlier works, it was published by Jock Murray of the John Murray publishing house. When Jock died and his publishing house was sold, Murphy moved to Eland Books, who republished the book in 2014.
