= Wheels Within Wheels: Autobiography =

1979 autobiography of Dervla Murphy

- Cover of John Murray first edition (1979)
- Author: Dervla Murphy
- Publisher: John Murray
- Publication date: 1979
- Pages: 236 (first edition)
- ISBN: 0719536499
- Dewey Decimal: 910/.92/4
- Preceded by: A Place Apart
- Followed by: Race to the Finish?

Wheels Within Wheels: Autobiography is Irish cyclist and travel writer Dervla Murphy's autobiographical book. It was first published in 1979 by John Murray, and reprinted by Eland Books in 2010 with the subtitle The Makings of a Traveller.

The book describes the first thirty years of Murphy's life, before the journey described in her first book, Full Tilt. Murphy writes:

I stood at the threshold of an independent life and I felt, that night, my parents’ blessing on it
