= Dervla Murphy =

Irish writer and touring cyclist (1931–2022)

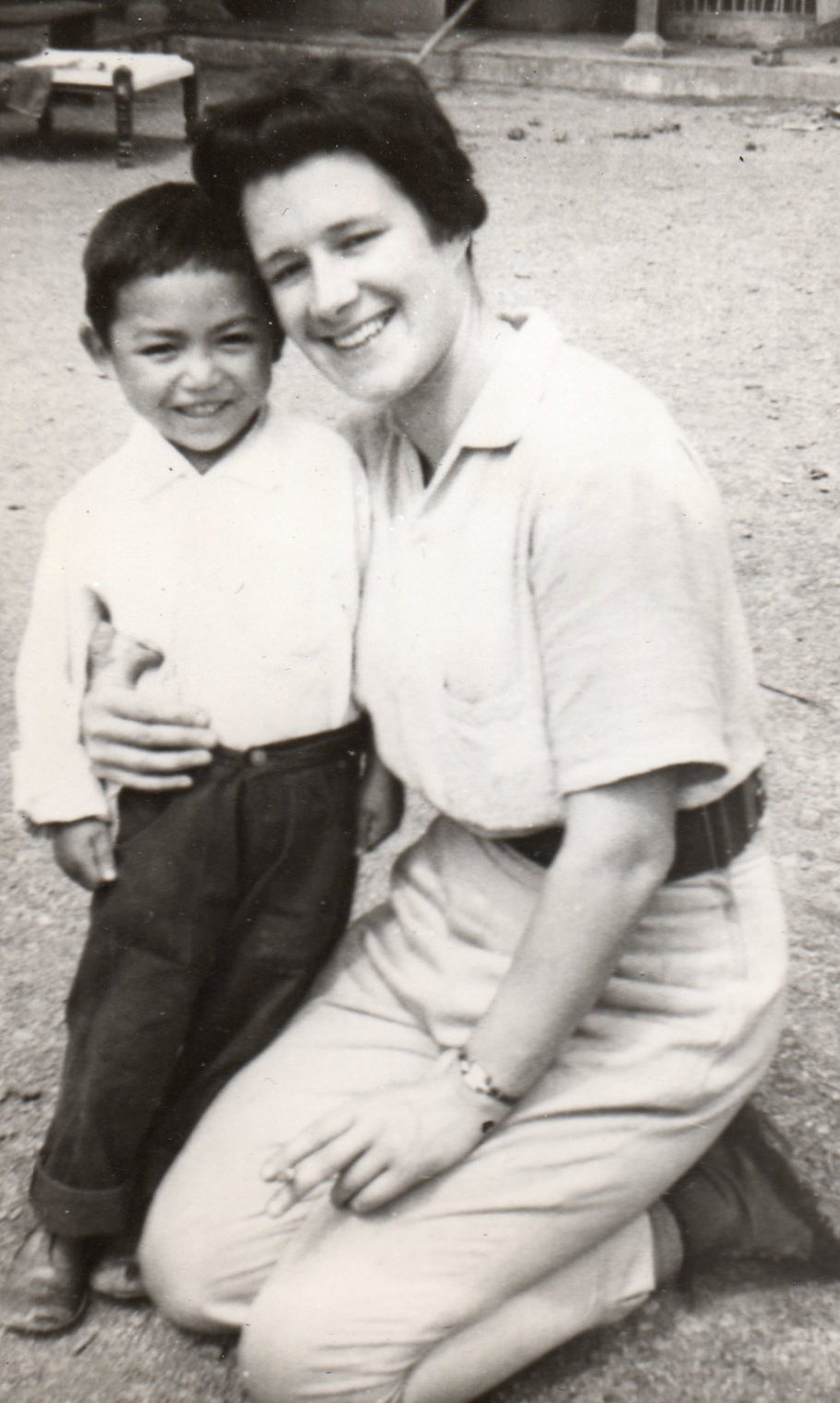
- Murphy in India in 1965
- Born: 28 November 1931; Lismore, County Waterford, Ireland
- Died: 22 May 2022 (aged 90); Lismore, County Waterford, Ireland
- Occupations: Cyclist, travel writer
- Children: 1
- Writing career
- Period: 1965–2015
- Genre: Travel (non-fiction)
- Notable works: Full Tilt; A Place Apart
- Notable awards: Christopher Ewart-Biggs Memorial Prize (1979)
- Website: www.dervlamurphy.com

Dervla Murphy (28 November 1931 – 22 May 2022) was an Irish touring cyclist and author of adventure travel books, writing for more than 50 years.

Murphy is best known for her 1965 book Full Tilt: Ireland to India with a Bicycle, about an overland cycling trip through Europe, Iran, Afghanistan, Pakistan and India. She followed this with volunteer work helping Tibetan refugees in India and Nepal and trekking with a mule through Ethiopia. Murphy took a break from travel writing following the birth of her daughter, and then wrote about her travels with Rachel in India, Pakistan, South America, Madagascar and Cameroon. She later wrote about her solo trips through Romania, Africa, Laos, the states of the former Yugoslavia and Siberia. In 2005, she visited Cuba with her daughter and three granddaughters.

Murphy normally travelled alone without luxuries and depending on the hospitality of local people. She was in some dangerous situations; for example, she was attacked by wolves in the former Yugoslavia, threatened by soldiers in Ethiopia, and robbed in Siberia. However, she described her worst incident as tripping over cats at home and shattering her left arm.

== Early life ==
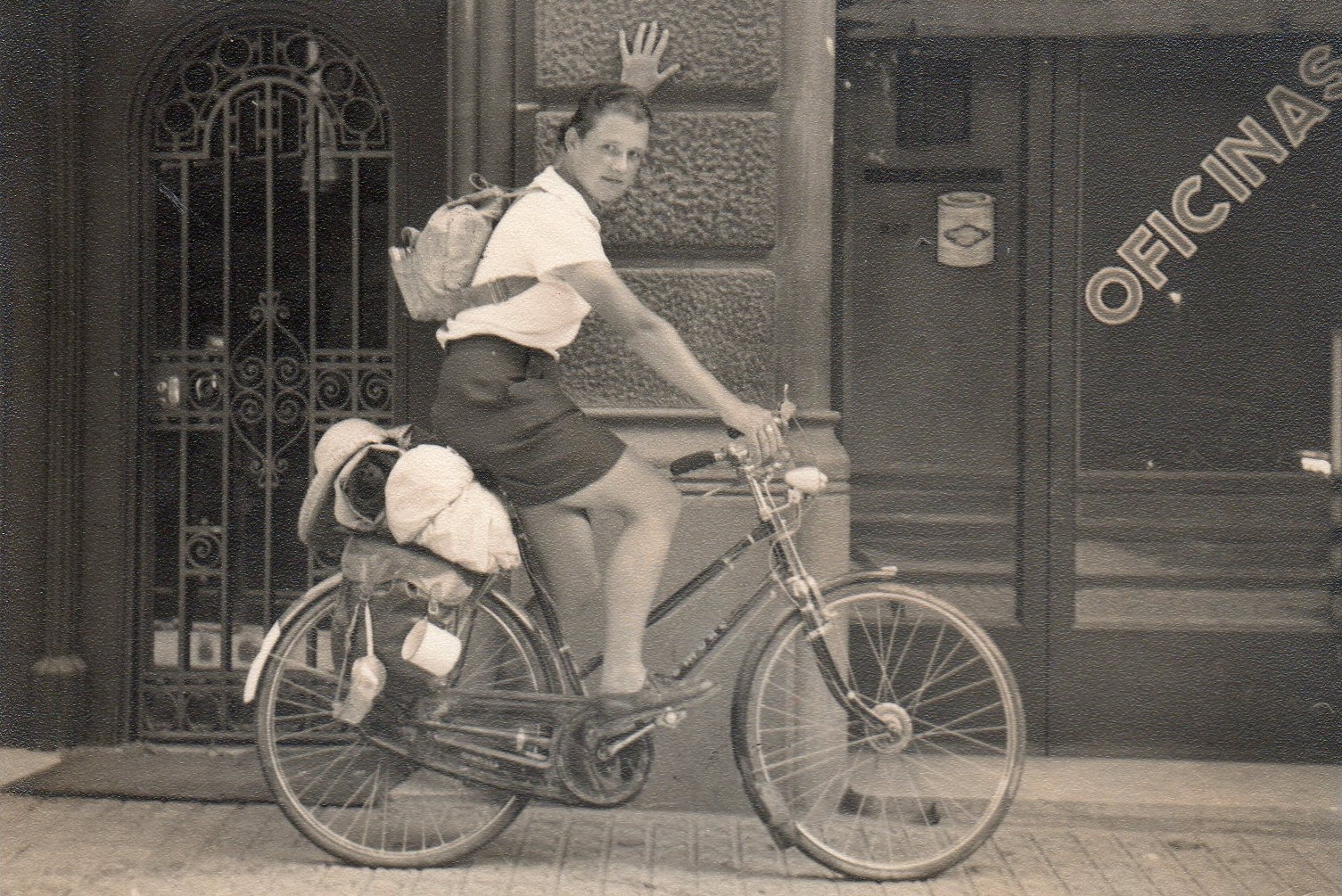
Dervla Murphy in Barcelona, 1950s

Dervla Murphy was born and brought up in Lismore, County Waterford. Her parents were from Dublin and had moved to Lismore when her father was appointed county librarian. When Murphy was one year old, her mother developed rheumatoid arthritis, from which she suffered for the rest of her life. They were advised not to have any more children and Dervla grew up as an only child. From a young age, Murphy planned to travel:

For my tenth birthday my parents gave me a second-hand bicycle and Pappa [her grandfather] sent me a second-hand atlas. Already I was an enthusiastic cyclist, though I had never before owned a bicycle, and soon after my birthday I resolved to cycle to India one day. I have never forgotten the exact spot, on a steep hill near Lismore, where this decision was made. Half-way up I rather proudly looked at my legs, slowly pushing the pedals around, and the thought came "If I went on doing this for long enough I could get to India."

Murphy attended secondary school at the Ursuline Convent in Waterford but left at age 14 to take care of her disabled mother. During young adulthood she took a number of short trips (between three and six weeks): to Wales and southern England in 1951; to Belgium, Germany and France in 1952; and two trips to Spain in 1954 and 1956. She published a number of travel articles in the Hibernia journal and the Irish Independent newspaper, but her Spanish travel book was rejected by publishers.

Murphy's first lover, Godfrey, died abroad in 1958 and her father became ill with nephritis, a complication of influenza, and died in February 1961. Her mother's health had been deteriorating for many years, and she died in August 1962. Her mother's death freed Murphy from her domestic duties and allowed her to make the extended trip for which she had long planned:

The hardships and poverty of my youth had been a good apprenticeship for this form of travel. I had been brought up to understand that material possessions and physical comfort should never be confused with success, achievement and security.

Murphy published an autobiography Wheels Within Wheels in 1979, describing her life before the journey described in Full Tilt.

== Travels and writing ==
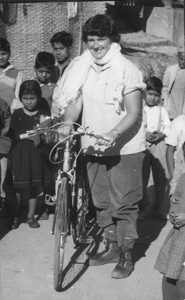
Dervla Murphy with her bike

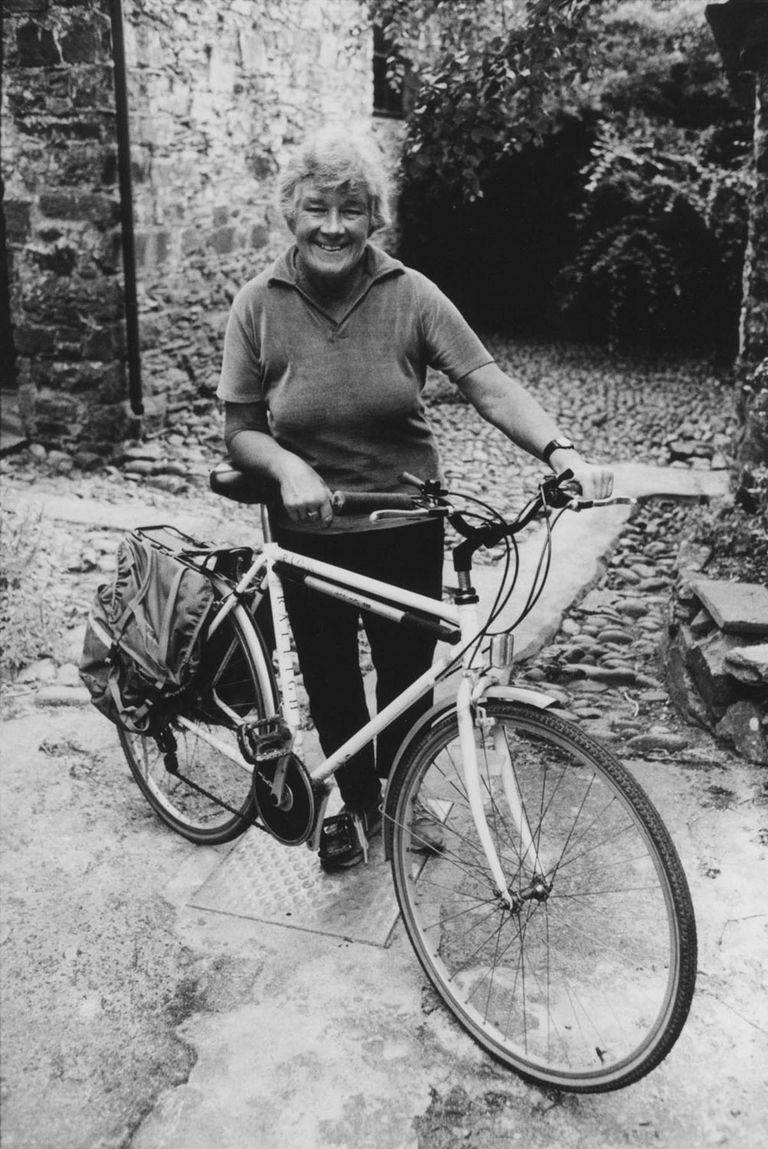
Dervla Murphy with bike in 1994

=== Full Tilt and other early writings ===
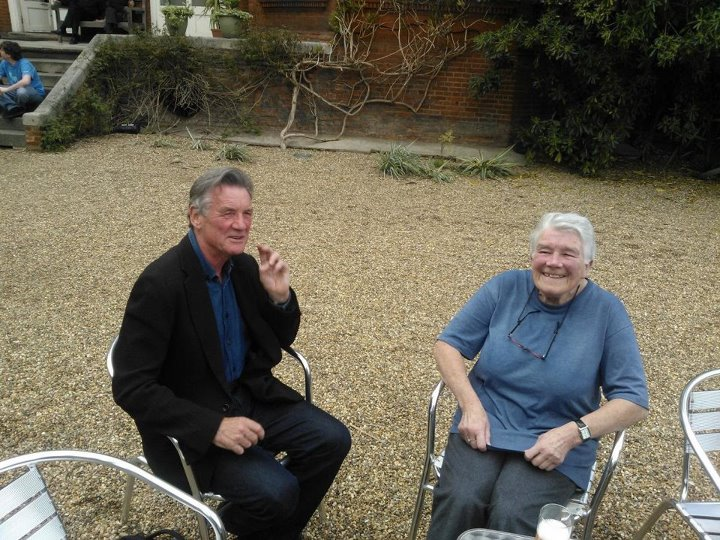
Dervla Murphy and Sir Michael Palin in 2012

In 1963, Murphy set off on her first long-distance bicycle tour, a self-supported trip from Ireland to India. Taking a pistol along with other equipment aboard her Armstrong Cadet men's bicycle (named Rozinante in allusion to Don Quixote's steed and always known as Roz), she passed through Europe during one of the worst winters in years. In Yugoslavia, Murphy began to write a journal instead of mailing letters. In Iran, she used her gun to frighten off a group of thieves, and "used unprintable tactics" to escape from an attempted rapist at a police station. She received her worst injury of the journey on a bus in the Kingdom of Afghanistan, when a rifle butt hit her and fractured three ribs; however, this only delayed her for a short while. She wrote appreciatively about the landscape and people of Afghanistan, calling herself "Afghanatical" and claiming that the Afghan "is a man after my own heart". In Pakistan, she visited Swat (where she was a guest of the last wali, Miangul Aurangzeb) and the mountain area of Gilgit. The final leg of her trip took her through the Punjab region and over the border to India towards Delhi. Her journal was later published by John Murray as her first book Full Tilt: Ireland to India with a Bicycle. She had sent it to John Murray at the suggestion of Penelope Betjeman whom she had met in Delhi during her journey, although initially too modest to contact such an illustrious publisher of travel books; she had a happy publishing relationship with Jock Murray (John Murray VI) until his death in 1993.

After arriving in Delhi, Murphy worked as a volunteer helping Tibetan refugees under the auspices of Save the Children. She spent five months in a refugee camp in Dharamsala run by Tsering Dolma, sister of the 14th Dalai Lama. She then cycled through the Kullu Valley, spending Christmas in Malana. Her journals from this period were published in her second book, Tibetan Foothold.

On returning to Europe, Murphy took part in a fundraising campaign for Save the Children, and in 1965, she worked with another group of Tibetan refugees in Pokhara, Kingdom of Nepal (described in The Waiting Land).

In 1966, Murphy made her first trip to Africa. She travelled to the Empire of Ethiopia and walked with a pack mule from Asmara to Addis Ababa, confronted by Kalashnikov-carrying soldiers on the way. This journey was described in her fourth book, In Ethiopia with a Mule.

=== Travels with Rachel ===
Murphy's daughter Rachel accompanied her on a trip to India at the age of five; they flew into Bombay and travelled to Goa and Coorg (described in On a Shoestring to Coorg). The pair later journeyed to Baltistan (Where the Indus is Young), Peru (Eight Feet in the Andes) and Madagascar (Muddling through in Madagascar). Their last trip was through Cameroon on a horse, where Dervla was frequently mistaken for Rachel's husband (Cameroon with Egbert). She surmised that this misgendering occurred not only because of her physique but also because the idea of women travelling so far without a man was inconceivable. She tried different ways to correct the understanding, the most successful being unbuttoning her shirt. "It was, like her literary voice, frank and persuasive," wrote Jori Finkel in her Washington Post obituary.

On travelling with a child, Murphy wrote:

A child's presence emphasises your trust in the community's goodwill. And because children pay little attention to racial or cultural differences, junior companions rapidly demolish barriers of shyness or apprehension often raised when foreigners unexpectedly approach a remote village.

=== Politicisation ===
In 1978, Murphy wrote A Place Apart about her travels in Northern Ireland and encounters with members of the Protestant and Catholic religious communities. It won the 1979 Christopher Ewart-Biggs Memorial Prize. She credits her 1982 book Race to the Finish? The Nuclear Stakes as a turning point that led her to write more about political issues. In 1985 she lived for several months in Bradford and Birmingham, talking to members of the Asian, Afro-Caribbean and White communities and witnessing first-hand one of the Handsworth riots (described in Tales From Two Cities). In 1992, she cycled from Kenya to Zimbabwe, where she witnessed the impact of AIDS; when describing this journey in The Ukimwi Road, she criticised the role of non-governmental organisations in sub-Saharan Africa. Her other writings include discussions about the aftermath of apartheid (South from the Limpopo) and the Rwandan genocide (Visiting Rwanda), the displacement of tribal peoples (One Foot in Laos), and post-war reconstruction of the Balkans (Through the Embers of Chaos).

She was anti-globalization and critical of NATO, the World Bank, the International Monetary Fund and the World Trade Organization. She spoke out against nuclear power and climate change.

Murphy stated that some readers disapproved of the "political stuff", but another group "tells me they haven't thought about these things in this way before and are glad that I've written and thought more about the political side. My view is that I have these things I want to say and I don't really care if it spoils a pure travel book."

=== Irish babushka ===
In 2002, aged 71, Murphy planned to cycle in the Ussuriland region of eastern Russia. She broke her knee while on the Baikal Amur Mainline railway, then tore a calf muscle while recuperating at Lake Baikal, and her plans changed to a journey around Siberia by train, boat and bus, documented in Through Siberia by Accident. She revisited Siberia and wrote a companion book, Silverland.

In 2005, she visited Cuba with her daughter and three granddaughters, and made two return trips in 2006 and 2007 (described in The Island that Dared). Her Havana experiences are also featured in a collection of traveller's tales.

Over the summer of 2011, Murphy spent a month in the Palestinian Gaza Strip, where she met liberals and Islamists, Hamas and Fatah supporters. She described her stay in a book published in 2013: A Month by the Sea. She wrote about further encounters with Israelis and Palestinians in her 2015 book, Between River and Sea.

== Personal life and interests ==
Murphy never married. In 1968, she gave birth to her only child, Rachel, fathered by Irish Times journalist Terence de Vere White. Her decision to bring up her daughter alone was described as "a brave choice in 1960s Ireland" by The Sunday Business Post, although she said she felt safe from criticism because she was in her thirties and was financially and professionally secure. Following Rachel's birth, she spent five years as a book reviewer before returning to travel writing.

Murphy lived in Lismore with five dogs and three cats. She was a patron of Sustrans, a British charity for sustainable travel, and of the Lismore Immrama Festival of Travel Writing.

In 2009, Murphy appeared on the BBC Radio 4 programme Great Lives, nominating Dame Freya Stark as a Great Life, supported by expert John Murray VII of the publishing family. She was herself chosen as the subject of the programme by Hilary Bradt in 2025.

In April 2022, she spoke at her home to an interviewer from the Financial Times, who was "instructed by her publisher to bring along some 'really good cheddar'. And beer." During the conversation Murphy "claim[ed] to have no time to dwell on the past because she finds so much in current events to worry about, following the news on the BBC World Service radio and Al Jazeera on her computer because she has no desire for — indeed, has never owned — a television." and said that "There are so many books to be read. The problem is, at 90, there isn’t enough time to read them all".

=== Death ===
Murphy died at her home in Lismore on 22 May 2022, aged 90. She was survived by her daughter Rachel and her three granddaughters. The President of Ireland, Michael D. Higgins, said "Her contribution to writing, and to travel writing in particular, had a unique commitment to the value of human experience in all its diversity."

== Recognition ==
In 2019, she was presented with the inaugural Inspiring Cyclist of the Year award by Dublin-based advocacy group I BIKE Dublin. The same year, she received the Royal Geographical Society's Ness Award "for the popularisation of geography through travel literature".

== Publications ==
Title	Year	Publisher	ISBN	Pages
Full Tilt: Ireland to India with a Bicycle	1965	John Murray		235
Tibetan Foothold	1966	John Murray		206
The Waiting Land: A Spell in Nepal	1967	John Murray		216
In Ethiopia with a Mule	1968	John Murray		281
On a Shoestring to Coorg: An Experience of South India	1976	John Murray	0719532841	261
Where the Indus Is Young: A Winter in Baltistan	1977	John Murray	071953335X	266
A Place Apart: Northern Ireland in the 1970s	1978	John Murray	0719534763	290
Wheels Within Wheels: Autobiography	1979	John Murray	0719536499	236
Race to the Finish? The Nuclear Stakes	1982	John Murray	071953884X	264
Eight Feet in the Andes	1983	John Murray	0719540836	276
Muddling through in Madagascar	1985	John Murray	0719542391	288
Changing the Problem: Post-forum Reflections	1984	The Lilliput Press	0946640076	36
Ireland (text by Dervla Murphy and photography by Klaus Francke)	1985	Orbis	0856137979	208
Tales from Two Cities: Travel of Another Sort	1987	John Murray	0719544351	314
Cameroon with Egbert	1990	John Murray	0719546893	282
Transylvania and Beyond	1992	John Murray	9781780601205	239
The Ukimwi Road: From Kenya to Zimbabwe	1993	John Murray	0719552508	276
South from the Limpopo: Travels through South Africa	1997	John Murray	0719557895	432
Visiting Rwanda	1998	The Lilliput Press	1901866114	246
One Foot in Laos	1999	John Murray	0719559693	284
Through the Embers of Chaos: Balkan Journeys	2002	John Murray	0719562325	388
Through Siberia by Accident: A Small Slice of Autobiography	2005	John Murray	0719566630	302
Silverland: A Winter Journey Beyond the Urals	2006	John Murray	9780719568282	288
The Island that Dared: Journeys in Cuba	2008	Eland	9781906011352	421
A Month by the Sea: Encounters in Gaza	2013	Eland	9781906011475	258
Between River and Sea: Encounters in Israel and Palestine	2015	Eland	9781780600451	442

Murphy's books from 1965 to 1979 have all been republished in new editions by Eland, as travel classics.

== See also ==
- Sustrans
- Bicycle touring
