= In Ethiopia with a Mule =

1968 travel book by Dervla Murphy

- Cover of John Murray first edition (1968)
- Author: Dervla Murphy
- Publisher: John Murray
- Publication date: 1968
- Pages: 281 (first edition)
- Dewey Decimal: 916.3046
- Preceded by: The Waiting Land
- Followed by: On a Shoestring to Coorg

In Ethiopia with a Mule is a book by Irish author Dervla Murphy. It was first published by John Murray in 1968.

== Summary ==
In Ethiopia with a Mule is a story of Murphy's 1966 trek across the highlands of Ethiopia with a pack-mule. Inspired by Prester John and the Queen of Sheba, she walked a thousand miles south from the Red Sea shore to Addis Ababa. Along the way, she visited Aksum, crossed the Simien Mountains, and descended to the ruined palaces of Gondar and Lake Tana.

== Publication history ==
The book was first published in 1968. Like Murphy's other earlier works, it was published by Jock Murray of publishers John Murray. She was close to Jock, and she named the mule Jock after him. When Jock (the publisher) died, and his publishing house was sold, Murphy moved to another publisher, Eland Books, who republished the book in 2011.
