= Monica Connell =

- Born: Belfast, Northern Ireland
- Occupations: Writer, photographer

Monica Connell is a Northern Irish anthropologist, photographer and writer.

Her first book, Against A Peacock Sky (1991), was shortlisted for the Yorkshire Post Best First Work award. Recording her time in a remote village in western Nepal, it was translated into German and Dutch and was reprinted by Eland in 2014. An extract appeared in House of Snow: An Anthology of the Greatest Writing About Nepal (2016).

Her two illustrated books, A Universal Passion: Music and Dance from Many Cultures (2008) and Flying High: New Circus in Bristol (2011) both explore contemporary culture in Bristol. Her most recent book, Gathering Carrageen: A Return to Donegal (2015), documents her rediscovery of the place where she had spent her childhood holidays. She currently lives in the UK.
