= Visiting Rwanda =

Travel book by Dervla Murphy

- Cover of The Lilliput Press first edition (1998)
- Author: Dervla Murphy
- Publisher: The Lilliput Press
- Publication date: 1998
- Pages: 246 (first edition)
- ISBN: 1901866114
- Preceded by: South from the Limpopo
- Followed by: One Foot in Laos

Visiting Rwanda is a nonfiction book by Irish author Dervla Murphy, detailing her travels in Rwanda in the aftermath of the 1994 Rwandan genocide. It was first published in 1998.

== Summary ==
In 1997, Murphy travelled to Rwanda to trek through the mountains there. However, the country was still reeling from the 1994 genocide, and Murphy conceded that conditions would not allow a trek. Instead, she talked to the Rwandans, professionals and peasants, Hutu and Tutsis alike, about the country's future. The result is part travel narrative, part genocide study.

Murphy's usual publisher Jock Murray refused the book – "We didn't want another genocidal war" – so it was instead issued by The Lilliput Press who had earlier published a pamphlet of Murphy's on Northern Ireland.

== Critical reception ==
In his review for The Spectator, William Spindler criticised Murphy's examination of Rwanda's history, noting that "[h]er compassion for the victims of the genocide leads her to side with those who claim to govern on their behalf, accepting uncritically some of their most questionable assertions." In a review for Third World Quarterly, Elaine Windrich found Murphy to be "particularly astute on the role of the churches in the genocide", which she attributed to the author's Irish roots. In a review for African Business, Steven Williams found that Murphy "pulls no punches" in the book, including making a controversial argument in favour of the death penalty as a means for restoring order in Rwanda. The Irish Times' Mary Russell noted that despite Murphy's "political vehemence", "the traveller within constantly escapes" and the book thus still holds appeal for fans of travel literature.
