= The Island that Dared =

Travel book by Dervla Murphy

The Island that Dared: Journeys in Cuba
- Cover of Eland Books first edition (2008)
- Author: Dervla Murphy
- Publisher: Eland Books
- Publication date: 2008
- Pages: 421 (first edition)
- ISBN: 9781906011352
- Dewey Decimal: 917.2910464
- Preceded by: Silverland
- Followed by: A Month by the Sea

The Island that Dared: Journeys in Cuba is a book by Irish author Dervla Murphy. It was first published by Eland Books in 2008.

== Summary ==
The Island that Dared describes the three journeys of Murphy to Cuba with her daughter, Rachel, and three grand-daughters, Rose, Clodagh and Zea, in 2005, and returning on her own in 2006 and 2007.

Murphy's experiences in Havana were later also featured in a collection of traveller's tales.
