= Tibetan Foothold =

Travel book by Dervla Murphy

- Cover of John Murray first edition (1966)
- Author: Dervla Murphy
- Publisher: John Murray
- Publication date: 1966
- Pages: 206 (first edition)
- Dewey Decimal: 325.2515
- Preceded by: Full Tilt
- Followed by: The Waiting Land

Tibetan Foothold is a book by Irish author Dervla Murphy. It was first published by John Murray in 1966.

== Summary ==
After her journey by bicycle from Ireland to India in 1963, as described in Full Tilt: Ireland to India with a Bicycle, Murphy immerses herself in the life of the subcontinent. She works for six months in an orphanage for Tibetan children in Northern India, falling in love with the "Tiblets": the children of the new Tibet-in-exile. Murphy also explores India's Tibetan frontier.

== Editions ==
- 1966: John Murray, 206pp.
- 1969: Pan Books, 222pp, ISBN 033002339X.
- 2000: Flamingo, 230pp, ISBN 0006552137.
- 2011: Eland Books, 224pp, ISBN 9781906011642.
