= Foscadh =

2020 Irish film

- Poster
- Directed by: Seán Breathnach
- Screenplay by: Seán Breathnach
- Story by: Dónal Ryan
- Based on: The Thing about December by Dónal Ryan
- Produced by: Paddy Hayes
- Starring: Dónall Ó Héalai; Fionnuala Flaherty; Cillian Ó Gairbhí
- Cinematography: Colm Hogan
- Edited by: Conall de Cléir
- Music by: Sindri Már Sigfússon
- Production companies: TUA Films (Magamedia Teo)
- Release date: 23 July 2021 (Galway Film Fleadh)
- Running time: 93 minutes
- Country: Ireland
- Language: Irish

Foscadh (Irish: [ˈfˠasˠkə]; "Shelter"; also written in Gaelic script as Foscaḋ) is a 2021 Irish film, based on characters in the novel The Thing about December by Donal Ryan. The film premiered at the 2021 Galway Film Fleadh. It was selected as the Irish entry for the Best International Feature Film at the 94th Academy Awards.

== Plot ==
John Cunliffe (Dónall Ó hÉalaí) is a 28-year-old recluse, coddled by his parents, living on a farm in Connemara, Ireland. When his parents pass away, John discovers that he has inherited land in the way of a proposed lucrative windfarm development. Having never had to fend for himself, he has to grow up fast: navigating friendships, romance and matters of trust for the first time. Ó hÉalaí described his character as having been "sheltered all his life by his parents […] when he loses them, his story is him becoming an adult, and all that entails."

== Production ==
Foscadh was filmed in 2019 and 2020, in Corr na Móna, County Galway having received a grant of €400,000 from the Broadcasting Authority of Ireland.

== Reception ==
Foscadh received its world premiere at the Galway Film Fleadh in July 2021, where it won the Award for Best First Film. Director, Seán Breathnach was awarded the Jury Prize for Best Director at the 2021 Newport Beach Film Festival and was nominated for a Zebbie award by the Writer's Guild of Ireland for his script in the feature film category. The film was also awarded the top prize, The Golden Tree, for best film at the 4th Kimolos International Film Festival. The Irish Times in a four star review described the film as a "powerful" piece that "poignantly chronicles rural male loneliness." Declan Burke of The Irish Examiner praises Seán Breathnach for crafting "...an emotionally charged psychologically complex film." Variety described the film as a "forensic and unflinching examination" of loneliness and longing that is "very well performed and visually striking." The Phoenix in its review of the film, described it as "among the very best debut feature films to be made in Ireland.".

== See also ==
- List of submissions to the 94th Academy Awards for Best International Feature Film
- List of Irish submissions for the Academy Award for Best International Feature Film
