= A Month by the Sea =

Travel book by Dervla Murphy

A Month by the Sea: Encounters in Gaza
- Cover of Eland Books first edition (2013)
- Author: Dervla Murphy
- Publisher: Eland Books
- Publication date: 2013
- Pages: 258 (first edition)
- ISBN: 9781906011475
- Dewey Decimal: 915.31
- Preceded by: The Island that Dared
- Followed by: Between River and Sea

A Month by the Sea: Encounters in Gaza is a book by Irish author Dervla Murphy. It was first published by Eland Books in 2013.

== Summary ==
A Month by the Sea describes Murphy's stay in Palestine during Operation Cast Lead. She met liberals and Islamists, Hamas and Fatah supporters. A second book followed – Between River and Sea – but she destroyed the material for a third book based on visits to the Palestinian refugee camps in Jordan for fear that it might endanger their lives.
