= McPartlin =

McPartlin as a surname may refer to:

- Anna McPartlin (born 1972), Irish novelist
- Anthony McPartlin (born 1975), British actor, singer and television presenter; one half of Ant & Dec
- Frank McPartlin (1872–1943), American baseball player
- Robert F. McPartlin (1926-1987), American politician
- Ryan McPartlin (born 1975), American actor
