= Between River and Sea =

Travel book by Dervla Murphy

Between River and Sea: Encounters in Israel and Palestine
- Cover of Eland Books first edition (2015)
- Author: Dervla Murphy
- Publisher: Eland Books
- Publication date: 2015
- Pages: 442 (first edition)
- ISBN: 9781780600451
- Preceded by: A Month by the Sea

Between River and Sea: Encounters in Israel and Palestine is a book by Irish author Dervla Murphy. It was first published by Eland Books in 2015. It was Murphy's final book before her death in 2022.

== Summary ==
Between River and Sea describes Murphy's journeys into Israel and Palestine, talking with whoever she meets in Haifa, in the settlements, and in a refugee camp on the West Bank. It was her second book on Palestine, following on from A Month by the Sea, but she destroyed the material for a third book based on visits to the Palestinian refugee camps in Jordan for fear that it might endanger their lives.
