= From a Low and Quiet Sea =

2018 novel by Donal Ryan

First edition

From a Low and Quiet Sea is a novel written by Irish novelist Donal Ryan. It was first published in 2018 by Penguin Random House. It was longlisted for the 2018 Man Booker Prize. In 2021, a French translation was awarded the Prix Jean Monnet de Littérature Européene.

The novel focuses on three men dealing with loss: a Syrian doctor named Farouk fleeing from war, a young Irish bus driver named Lampy dealing with heartbreak and a terminally ill former lobbylist named John seeking forgiveness for his past choices.
