= All We Shall Know =

2016 novel by Donal Ryan

First edition

All We Shall Know is a novel written by Irish novelist Donal Ryan. It was first published in 2016 by Penguin Random House. It was shortlisted for Novel of the Year at the Irish Book Awards in 2016 and longlisted for the International Dublin Literary Award in 2018.
