= Eight Feet in the Andes =

Travel book by Dervla Murphy

- Cover of John Murray first edition (1983)
- Author: Dervla Murphy
- Publisher: John Murray
- Publication date: 1983
- Pages: 276 (first edition)
- ISBN: 0719540836
- Preceded by: Race to the Finish?
- Followed by: Muddling Through in Madagascar

Eight Feet in the Andes is a book by Irish author Dervla Murphy. It was first published by John Murray in 1983.

== Summary ==
Eight Feet in the Andes describes Murphy's time in Peru with her daughter Rachel. The trip was a turning point. Until then, she had enjoyed the liberation and excitement of travel, but the miseries endured by Indigenous people brought home to her how tough conditions were in places like Lima, with its rampant cholera and tuberculosis.
