= One Foot in Laos =

Travel book by Dervla Murphy

- Cover of John Murray first edition (1999)
- Author: Dervla Murphy
- Publisher: John Murray
- Publication date: 1999
- Pages: 284 (first edition)
- ISBN: 0719559693
- Preceded by: Visiting Rwanda
- Followed by: Through the Embers of Chaos

One Foot in Laos is a book by Irish author Dervla Murphy. It was first published by John Murray in 1999.
