= The Box (Swedish TV series) =

2021 Nordic television serial

- Genre: Supernatural psychological thriller
- Created by: Adi Hasak
- Directed by: Steve Shill; Johan Brisinger
- Starring: Anna Friel; Peter Stormare; Alexander Karim; Helen Behan; Olivia Grant; Shaq B. Grant; Letitia Hector
- Country of origin: Sweden
- Original language: English
- No. of series: 1
- No. of episodes: 7

Production
- Executive producer: Adi Hasak
- Running time: 30 minutes

Original release
- Network: Viaplay
- Release: 28 November 2021

The Box is a Swedish supernatural psychological thriller television series created by Adi Hasak for the Nordic Entertainment Group and first released on 28 November 2021 on Viaplay.

== Premise ==
Detective Sharon Pici appears to have mental issues. However, unknown to those around her, her actions are driven by supernatural forces.

== Cast and characters ==
=== Main ===
- Anna Friel as Sharon Pici: a Kansas City detective, titular "queen of the box".
- Peter Stormare as Jedidiah Brag: a police lieutenant and Pici's boss.
- Alexander Karim as Thomas Lovell: a detective, Pici's partner.
- Helen Behan as Tory Snow: a police department psychologist who is treating Pici.
- Olivia Grant as Sylvian Rosen: a prosecutor and also Pici's wife.
- Shaq B. Grant as Joseph Anderson: a police officer.
- Letitia Hector as Jenny Block: a trainee detective.

=== Recurring ===
- Nina Yndis as Adina Ilic: suspected of murdering her husband.
- Gerard Monaco as Joey Cox: another suspect.
- Julia Szczygiel as Charlene:
- Bjarne Graflund as an Off Duty Cop:
- Fredrik Malm as an Off Duty Cop:
- Dennis Duolee as Teddy Lewis:
- Nina Yndis as Zoe Popescu: Adina Ilic's sister.
- Silas Strand as Jonah: Pici and Rosen's son.
- John Guerrasio as Hiram Saperstein:
- Rennie Mirro as Fake Hiram Saperstein:
- Rasmus Wurm as The Magician:

== Episodes ==
The Box episodes
No. overall	No. in season	Title	Directed by	Written by	Original release date
1	1	"Queen of the Box"	Steve Shill	Adi Hasak	28 November 2021
2	2	"A Simple Story"	Johan Brisinger	Adi Hasak & Paula Killen	28 November 2021
3	3	"The Last Hurrah"	Steve Shill	Adi Hasak & Paula Killen	28 November 2021
4	4	"True Believer"	Steve Shill	Adi Hasak	28 November 2021
5	5	"The Dark"	Johan Brisinger	Adi Hasak	28 November 2021
6	6	"The Sinner"	Steve Shill	Adi Hasak & Josh Azouz	28 November 2021
7	7	"Queen of the Box (Part II)"	Steve Shill	Adi Hasak & Clare Siobhan Byrne	28 November 2021

== Background and production ==
The Box is an English language series created and written by Adi Hasak. An announcement about The Box was made at the 2020 MIPCOM, with production due to start in Sweden in February 2021. It was developed by the Nordic Entertainment Group who gave a straight to series order to be produced by Nice Drama, an NENT Studios company, that is now part of Viaplay Studios. Production was also undertaken by Adi TV Studios. Production started in March 2021.

== Release ==
The Box was released on the Viaplay streaming service in Poland, the Baltics and Nordic countries on 28 November 2021. It will be available in the Netherlands and the UK in 2022 when Viaplay is launched in those countries. For all other countries MGM has global distribution rights.
