= Anna McPartlin =

Irish novelist

- Born: 1972 (age 53–54); Dublin, Ireland
- Occupation: novelist

Anna McPartlin (born 1972) is an Irish novelist. Her novel Pack Up the Moon (2006) was her debut feature.

== Biography ==
Anna McPartlin was born in Dublin, Ireland, in 1972. As a teenager she grew up with her aunt and uncle as a fosterling in Kenmare, County Kerry. She studied marketing before working as a stand-up comedian. Her novels (since 2006) were translated into German. She is married and lives in Dublin.

McPartlin adapted her own book for a film version of The Last Days of Rabbit Hayes, filmed in 2025, with a cast including Niamh Algar and Sam Claflin.

== Novels ==
- Pack Up the Moon (2006)
- Apart from the Crowd (2007) also published as No Way to Say Goodbye (2009)
- The Truth Will Out (2008) also known in the states as As Sure As the Sun
- Alexandra, Gone (2010) also published as So what if I’m broken (2010) and The One I Love (2010)
- The Space Between Us (2011)
- Somewhere Inside Of Happy (2015)
- The Last Days of Rabbit Hayes (2015)
- Below the Big Blue Sky (2020)
- " Waiting for a Miracle" (2021)
