= Silverland =

Travel book by Dervla Murphy

Silverland: A Winter Journey Beyond the Urals
- Cover of John Murray first edition (2006)
- Author: Dervla Murphy
- Publisher: John Murray
- Publication date: 2006
- Pages: 288 (first edition)
- ISBN: 9780719568282
- Preceded by: Through Siberia by Accident
- Followed by: The Island that Dared

Silverland: A Winter Journey Beyond the Urals is a book by Irish author Dervla Murphy. It was first published by John Murray in 2006.
