= Helen Behan =

Irish actress

- Born: Ireland
- Occupation: Actress
- Years active: 2011–present
- Known for: This Is England '88 and The Virtues
- Spouse: Caimin
- Children: 4

Helen Behan is an Irish actress. Her most notable roles include This Is England '88 and The Virtues. Behan was named as one of Screen International's Stars of Tomorrow 2020.

== Early life and education ==
Helen Behan grew up Laytown, County Meath, Ireland.

During her student days in college, Behan attended part-time acting courses at the Gaiety Theatre, Dublin.

== Career ==
After a chance meeting in a pub, Shane Meadows invited Behan to audition for a part in the film This Is England '88, where she landed the role of Evelyn, nurse and later friend to Lol Jenkins (Vicky McClure). In 2019, Behan played the role of Anna, sister of Joseph (Stephen Graham) in The Virtues for which she received a nomination as Best supporting actress at the 2020 BAFTA TV awards.

Behan was named as one of Screen International's Stars of Tomorrow 2020, which showcases talent within the TV & film industry of Great Britain and Ireland.

In 2020, Behan starred in the Cathy Brady directed Irish drama thriller film Wildfire alongside Danika McGuigan and Nora-Jane Noone. In 2021, she took on a main role of police psychologist Tory Snow, in the Swedish supernatural psychological thriller series The Box, co-starring Anna Friel and Peter Stormare.

in 2022, Behan played the role of Abigail Ross in the ITV miniseries Holding, a four part adaptation of Graham Norton's bestselling novel. In 2023, Behan portrayed Monica Nolan in the Dublin sleuth film Barber alongside the protagonist played by Aidan Gillen.

== Personal life ==
Behan married Caimin and has four children. Her husband supported her move away from nursing into acting. During the COVID-19 outbreak she returned to her previous vocation.

== Filmography ==
Key
†	Denotes projects that have not yet been released

=== Film ===
Year	Title	Role	Notes	Ref.
2019	Elizabeth Is Missing	Helen	Television film	
2020	Wildfire	Joanne		
2021	Wolf	Jacob's Mother		
2023	Mud Queen	Helen	Short film	
2023	Barber	Monica Nolan		
2023	Suzie	Suzie	Short film	
2024	Small Things Like These	Mrs. Kehoe		
2024	Amongst the Wolves	Mediator		
2025	Christy	Pauline		
2026	Sub5	Zoe	Short film	
TBA	One Sweet Hour †	Eileen	Post-production	

=== Television ===
Year	Title	Role	Notes	Ref.
2011	This Is England '88	Evelyn	Miniseries; 3 episodes	
2013	Love/Hate	Marie	Episode: "Series 4, Episode 1"	
2015	This Is England '90	Helen	Miniseries; 3 episodes	
2018	Taken Down	Tia	Recurring role; 4 episodes	
2019	The Virtues	Anna	Miniseries; 4 episodes	
2020	Soulmates	Darcy	Episode: "The (Power) Ballad of Caitlin Jones"	
2021	Intruder	Angela Pitt	Miniseries; 4 episodes	
2021	The Box	Tory Snow	Series regular; 7 episodes	
2022	Holding	Abigail Ross	Miniseries; 4 episodes	
2023–2025	Malpractice	Dr Norma Callahan	Series regular; 10 episodes	
2024	Say Nothing	Marian Price (Older)	Miniseries; 3 episodes	
2025	Mix Tape	Marian	Miniseries; 4 episodes	
2025	Leonard and Hungry Paul	Helen	Series regular; 6 episodes	
TBA	The Rachel Incident †	Bridget	Pre-production	

== Awards and nominations ==
Year	Award	Category	Work	Result	Ref.
2020	IFTA Film & Drama Awards	Best Actress in a Leading Role - TV Drama	The Virtues	Won	
2020	British Academy Film Awards	BAFTA Award for Best Supporting Actress – TV	The Virtues	Nominated	
