= Through Siberia by Accident =

Travel book by Dervla Murphy

Through Siberia by Accident: A Small Slice of Autobiography
- Cover of John Murray first edition (2005)
- Author: Dervla Murphy
- Publisher: John Murray
- Publication date: 2005
- Pages: 302 (first edition)
- ISBN: 0719566630
- Preceded by: Through the Embers of Chaos
- Followed by: Silverland

Through Siberia by Accident: A Small Slice of Autobiography is a book by Irish author Dervla Murphy. It was first published by John Murray in 2005.

== Summary ==
Through Siberia by Accident records a trip made when Murphy was seventy-three, with a catalogue of accidents on that and previous outings.
