= Oliver MacDonagh =

Irish historian

- Born: Carlow, Ireland
- Died: Sydney, Australia
- Education: Clongowes Wood College, University College Dublin
- Scientific career
- Fields: History

Oliver Ormond Gerard Michael MacDonagh (1924–2002), was a professor of Irish history who made a particular study of the historic relationship between Ireland and the United Kingdom. MacDonagh spent most of his academic career at universities in Cambridge, Adelaide, Cork and Canberra.

== Early life ==
MacDonagh was born in Carlow, Ireland to Michael MacDonagh and Loretto Oliver, both of whom were bank officials. The family settled in Roscommon, where Oliver was initially educated by the Christian Brothers and for his secondary schooling was sent to board at Clongowes Wood College. At University College Dublin he studied History and Law, but socialised more with the 'literary set', graduating in 1944 with a Bachelor of Arts degree. He later received an MA from the National University of Ireland and a PhD from Cambridge University.

== Career ==
MacDonagh was called to the Irish Bar in 1945. From 1952 until 1964 he was a lecturer and Fellow of St Catharine's College, Cambridge where he was a visiting fellow in 1986 and Honorary Fellow in 1987. Between 1963 and 1964 he was a visiting fellow at the Australian National University, where he was closely associated with Professor Keith Hancock. In 1964 he was appointed professor of history at Flinders University on its establishment, which position he held until 1968. He returned to Ireland as Professor of Modern History at University College, Cork in 1968, remaining until 1973. In 1970 he was a visiting professor at Yale University. MacDonagh resigned from Cork in 1973 and returned to Australia as W.K. Hancock Professor in the Research School of Social Sciences at the Australian National University. He remained there until he retired in 1990.

In 1952 he married Carmel Hamilton with whom he had three sons and four daughters.

== Works ==
MacDonagh's first book The Passenger Acts: A Pattern of Government Growth (1961) was a critique of the inexorable expansion of government bureaucracy in the nineteenth century. It inspired many similar studies in Europe and the United States. In The Inspector General: Sir Jeremiah Fitzpatrick and Social Reform 1783–1802 (1981), he explored public administration in Ireland and Britain at the turn of the century through the career of his subject. His biographies of Daniel O'Connell, The Hereditary Bondsman (1988) and The Emancipist (1989) (combined in the single volume O'Connell: The life of Daniel O'Connell 1775 - 1847 (1990) have been described as a landmark of the genre.

Throughout his career, MacDonagh had over a hundred papers and thirteen books published, including in the field of English and Irish literature. His proposition of the novel as historical evidence, put forward in 1970 in an examination of Maria Edgeworth's Castle Rackrent, was further developed in his 1993 work Jane Austen: Real and Imagined Worlds. There he explored Austen's contemporary society through the imagined lives of her own novels characters.

MacDonagh also wrote extensively on the history of Irish immigration to Australia, and proposed the multi-volume bicentennial publication The Australians with Ken Inglis while chairman of the management committee of the Australian Bicentennial History Project. He also contributed numerous essays to the ten-volume collaborative project A New History of Ireland, first proposed by Professor T.W Moody in 1962.

== Honours ==
He received honorary doctorates from the NUI, Flinders University, and Sydney University. He was Fellow of the British Academy, member of the Royal Irish Academy, and honorary fellow of the Australian Academy of the Humanities.

== Bibliography ==
- Ireland: the Union and its aftermath (1977 reprinted 2003) ISBN 978-1-900621-81-6
- States of mind: a study of Anglo-Irish conflict, 1780-1980 (1983) ISBN 978-0-04-941012-1 - won the Christopher Ewart-Biggs Memorial Prize
- Early Victorian government, 1830-1870 (1977) ISBN 978-0-8419-0304-3
- The inspector general: Sir Jeremiah Fitzpatrick and the politics of social reform, 1783-1802 (1981) ISBN 978-0-85664-421-4
- Irish culture and nationalism, 1750-1950 (1983) ISBN 978-0-333-32858-3
- The Life of Daniel O'Connell 1775–1847 (1991) ISBN 978-1-230-85877-7
- Jane Austen: Real and Imagined Worlds (1991) ISBN 0-300-05449-1
