= South from the Limpopo =

Travel book by Dervla Murphy

South from the Limpopo: Travels through South Africa
- Cover of John Murray first edition (1997)
- Author: Dervla Murphy
- Publisher: John Murray
- Publication date: 1997
- Pages: 432 (first edition)
- ISBN: 0719557895
- Preceded by: The Ukimwi Road
- Followed by: Visiting Rwanda

South from the Limpopo: Travels through South Africa is a book by Irish author Dervla Murphy. It was first published by John Murray in 1997.
