= The Ukimwi Road =

Travel book by Dervla Murphy

The Ukimwi Road: From Kenya to Zimbabwe
- Cover of John Murray first edition (1993)
- Author: Dervla Murphy
- Publisher: John Murray
- Publication date: 1993
- Pages: 276 (first edition)
- ISBN: 0719552508
- Preceded by: Transylvania and Beyond
- Followed by: South from the Limpopo

The Ukimwi Road: From Kenya to Zimbabwe is a book by Irish author Dervla Murphy. It was first published by John Murray in 1993. Ukimwi is Swahili for AIDS.
