= Irfan Orga =

Turkish poet, staff officer, and author (1908–1970)

İrfan Orga (October 31, 1908 – November 29, 1970) was a Turkish fighter pilot, staff officer, and author, writing in English. He published books on many areas of Turkish life, cookery, and history, as well as a life of Atatürk under whom Orga served, and a universally admired autobiography (Portrait of a Turkish Family, 1950). He also wrote two educational books for children.

== Early life ==
Orga's memoirs describe his childhood and wealthy bourgeois family in Istanbul, Turkey, in the early 1900s. His mother, Şevkiye (1895–1940), was a Balkan/Turkish woman (aged fifteen at his birth), while his father ran his own business. He describes his autocratic grandmother as an eccentric socialite.

Educated at Kuleli Military High School, Harbiye Staff College, and Eskişehir Air College (1919–1933), Orga was born into a wealthy Ottoman Turkish family in Istanbul. Orga's life was significantly influenced by the outbreak of World War I. His father Hüsnü died on the way to the Dardanelles and his uncle Ahmet died in Syria. Orga witnessed first hand the hardships of the war, the Allied Occupation of Constantinople, the end of Ottoman Empire, and the birth of the modern Turkish republic.

In 1942/43, while he was in the UK on a three-year diplomatic posting from the Turkish Air Force, he met a young married Norman-Irish woman, Margaret Veronica Gainsboro née D'Arcy-Wright (1914/19–1974). Since living with a foreigner was then a military offence in Turkey, Orga, having resigned his commission in early 1947, eventually fled the country for the UK, arriving in London just before the Christmas of that year (in absentia, he was convicted and fined in an Ankara court in September 1949). He never returned to Turkey. Once Margaret's divorce had been finalised in January 1948, they married.

== Writing ==
In the UK, Orga sought various menial jobs, unsuccessfully, turning eventually to writing in 1949. Portrait of a Turkish Family received exceptional reviews from critics including John Betjeman, Harold Nicolson, Arthur Anderson, Barbara Worsley-Gough and Peter Quennell. His wife joined the publishers Secker & Warburg in 1957, later being appointed editor at W H Allen in the early 1960s.

Orga tells his stories with multiple layers of complexity. He quickly makes clear his changing environment, with the death of his grandfather, the main provider of two generations of his family and their servants. His father, being a worldly man, understands that war is imminent. He proposes that his family sell their hereditary home in Istanbul, and move to another less expensive place, outside the city. However, reluctance is voiced. Orga captures the fear that a man can be suddenly in charge of a large group of people who depend on him for their survival.

Orga was well-travelled, and wrote about his experiences. The Caravan Moves On (1958, Book Society Recommendation) is a story about the Yoruk nomads of the Taurus Mountains in southeastern Turkey. An earlier title, Cooking with Yogurt. was the first book in post-war Britain to specifically promote yogurt and its properties.

Ateş Orga, the writer and record producer, sums up his father as "a gentle and kind person, a man of wisdom and sensitivity, of psychology and perception, a man of honour [...] a dreamer, a questioner, a lover of life's spirit [...] the fortress of our existence [...] a good human being".

== Books by Irfan Orga ==
- Portrait of a Turkish Family London 1950; New York 1950, 1957; London 1988, 1993, 2006, afterword Ateş Orga, rev afterword 2011; Istanbul 1994, afterword Ateş Orga, 2009, prefaces Talât Sait Halman, Ayşe Kulin, rev afterword Ateş Orga; Athens 2000; Barcelona 2001; Amsterdam/Antwerp 2002, 2005, 2014; Florence 2007; Zürich/Hamburg 2009, rev afterword; Paris 2010, rev afterword; Oslo 2010; Lahore 2011; Bucharest 2014, rev afterword
- Cooking With Yogurt London 1956, 1975, 1981
- The Young Traveller in Turkey London 1957; Amsterdam nd
- The Caravan Moves On London 1958, Book Society Recommendation; Munich 1960; Eland, London 2002 abridged, afterword Ateş Orga; Florence 2008; Istanbul 2014
- The Land and People of Turkey London 1958 [under the pseudonym Ali Riza]
- Phoenix Ascendant London 1958
- Turkish Cooking London 1958, 1963, 1968, 1971, 1975; London 1999, foreword Jennifer Paterson, introduction Ateş Orga
- Atatürk London 1962 [jointly with Margarete Orga]
- Cooking the Middle East Way London 1962
- Dark Journey: the Legend of Kamelya and Murat London 2014, afterword Ateş Orga
