= Through the Embers of Chaos =

Travel book by Dervla Murphy

Through the Embers of Chaos: Balkan Journeys
- Cover of John Murray first edition (2002)
- Author: Dervla Murphy
- Publisher: John Murray
- Publication date: 2002
- Pages: 388 (first edition)
- ISBN: 0719562325
- Preceded by: One Foot in Laos
- Followed by: Through Siberia by Accident

Through the Embers of Chaos: Balkan Journeys is a nonfiction book by Irish author Dervla Murphy, detailing her travels through the Balkans. It was first published by John Murray in 2002.

== Critical reception ==
Human Rights Watch director Steve Crawshaw, writing in The Independent, panned the book, particularly Murphy's repeated "reluctance to address context". The Guardian's Matthew Collin noted that Murphy's likability makes it easier for readers to get through the book's "relentless barrage of facts, acronyms and grim vignettes". In a review for the Library Journal, Melinda Stivers Leach praised the book as "both highly educational and deeply inspiring". The Irish Times' Owen Dawson also gave the book a positive review, concluding: "This is Murphy at her best – entertaining, observant, informed and, above all else, thoroughly human."
