= John Moriarty (writer) =

Irish writer and philosopher

John Moriarty (2 February 1938 – 1 June 2007) was an Irish writer and philosopher.

A native of Moyvane, County Kerry, he was educated in Listowel and at University College Dublin. In 1974, he moved to England from Canada where he had taught English literature at the University of Manitoba, and subsequently became a live-in gardener in the Carmelite monastery at Boars Hill, Oxford.

Moriarty subsequently lived at the foot of Mangerton Mountain in County Kerry until his death.

A film "inspired by the works" of Moriarty, Dreamtime, Revisited, was directed by Dónal Ó Céilleachair and Julius Ziz and released in October 2012.

== Books ==
- Dreamtime (Dublin, The Lilliput Press, 1994 - revised 1999)
- Turtle Was Gone a Long Time: Crossing the Kedron (The Lilliput Press, 1996)
- Horsehead Nebula Neighing (The Lilliput Press, 1997)
- Anaconda Canoe (The Lilliput Press 1999)
- Nostos (autobiography) (The Lilliput Press 2001)
- Invoking Ireland: Ailiu Iath n-hErend (The Lilliput Press, 2005)
- Slí na Fírinne (Slí na Fírinne Publishing, 2006)
- Night Journey to Buddh Gaia (The Lilliput Press, 2006)
- Serious Sounds (The Lilliput Press, 2007)
- What the curlew said. Nostos continued (autobiography) (The Lilliput Press, 2007)
- One Evening in Eden (The Lilliput Press, 2007) - a CD box set containing a collection of stories narrated by Moriarty

== Interviews ==
A series of interviews of Moriarty, by Joe Duffy on the RTÉ radio show Liveline, are available as an iTunes podcast.

In 2024, Manchán Magan released a series of talks he had with people on a selection of Moriarty's readings, in podcast form: The Bog Shaman: Manchán Magan on Moriarty.
