= The Last Days of Rabbit Hayes =

Irish drama film

The Last Days Of Rabbit Hayes
- Directed by: Jim O'Hanlon
- Screenplay by: Anna McPartlin
- Based on: The Last Days Of Rabbit Hayes by Anna McPartlin
- Produced by: Jessie Fisk; Collie McCarthy; Diarmuid Hughes; Joram Willink; Maike Neve
- Starring: Niamh Algar; Sam Claflin; Alisha Weir; Colm Meaney; Sinéad Cusack; Ruth Bradley
- Production companies: Feline Films; Forty Foot Pictures; Bind Film
- Countries: Ireland; Netherlands
- Language: English

The Last Days Of Rabbit Hayes is an upcoming Irish and Dutch drama film, adapted from her own novel of the same name by Anna McPartlin and directed by Jim O'Hanlon. The cast is led by Niamh Algar, Sam Claflin and Alisha Weir.

== Cast ==
- Niamh Algar
- Sam Claflin
- Alisha Weir
- Colm Meaney
- Sinéad Cusack
- Ruth Bradley
- Tom Glynn-Carney

== Production ==
The film is an adaptation of the novel of the same name by Anna McPartlin and directed by Jim O'Hanlon. McPartlin adapted the screenplay herself. A co-production between Ireland and the Netherlands, it is produced by Jessie Fisk of Feline Films with Collie McCarthy and Diarmuid Hughes for Forty Foot Pictures and Joram Willink and Maike Neve for Bind Film. Finite Films, AMcP Films and Hotdrop Films and Paradiso Films are co-producers with funding from Screen Ireland, RTÉ, the UK Global Screen Fund, the Netherlands Film Fund and Coimisiun na Mean.

The cast is led by Niamh Algar, Sam Claflin and Alisha Weir and also includes Colm Meaney, Sinéad Cusack and Ruth Bradley.

Principal photography took place in Dublin, Ireland and was completed by October 2025.
