= Strange Flowers =

2020 novel by Donal Ryan

- First edition cover
- Author: Donal Ryan
- Genre: Domestic novel
- Publisher: Doubleday
- Publication date: 2020
- ISBN: 978-0-857-52522-2

Strange Flowers is a domestic novel written by Irish novelist Donal Ryan. It was first published in 2020 by Doubleday. It was voted Novel of the Year at the 2020 Irish Book Awards.
