= Muddling Through in Madagascar =

Travel book by Dervla Murphy

- Cover of John Murray first edition (1985)
- Author: Dervla Murphy
- Publisher: John Murray
- Publication date: 1985
- Pages: 288 (first edition)
- ISBN: 0719542391
- Preceded by: Eight Feet in the Andes
- Followed by: Tales from Two Cities

Muddling Through in Madagascar is a book by Irish author Dervla Murphy. It was first published by John Murray in 1985.
