= Christopher Ewart-Biggs Memorial Prize =

The Christopher Ewart-Biggs Memorial Prize was created in 1977, in memory of Christopher Ewart-Biggs, British Ambassador to Ireland, who was assassinated by the Provisional Irish Republican Army in 1976.

Founded by his widow Jane Ewart-Biggs (following her death, the literary prize is currently administered jointly by their 3 children) following the death of her husband, its stated goal is to promote peace and reconciliation in Ireland, a greater understanding between the peoples of the United Kingdom and Ireland, or closer co-operation between partners of the European Community now known as the EU.

It is awarded to a book, a play or a piece of journalism that best fulfills this aim, published during a two-year period up to December 31 of the year preceding the year in which the prize is awarded. The value of the biennially awarded literary prize is currently set at £7,500, an increase on the original £5,000 award of 1977.

== Past winners ==
The years of publication/broadcast for which the prize was awarded is given. In earlier years the Prize was identified by the year of award, but the official website now gives year of publication/broadcast.

- 1978: A. T. Q. Stewart, The Narrow Ground: Aspects of Ulster 1609-1969
- 1978: Mícheál Mac Gréil, Prejudice and Tolerance in Ireland
- 1979: Stewart Parker, I'm A Dreamer, Montreal
- 1979: Dervla Murphy, A Place Apart
- 1980: Robert Kee, Ireland: A Television History
- 1981: F. S. L. Lyons, Culture and Anarchy in Ireland, 1890-1939
- 1982: Fortnight magazine
- 1983: John Bowman, De Valera and the Ulster Question, 1917-1973
- 1984: Oliver MacDonagh, States of Mind: A Study of Anglo-Irish Conflict, 1780-1980
- 1984: Padraig O'Malley, The Uncivil Wars: Ireland Today
- 1985: Brian Friel, Translations
- 1986: Frank McGuinness, Observe the Sons of Ulster Marching Towards the Somme
  - 1986 Special Award: Hubert Butler
- 1987–88: David McKittrick and Mary Holland, newspaper columns
- 1989–90: John H. Whyte, Interpreting Northern Ireland
  - 1989–90 special citation: Blackstaff Press
- 1991–92: Brian Keenan, An Evil Cradling
- 1993–94: Fionnuala O'Connor, In Search of a State: Catholics in Northern Ireland
- 1995–96: Norman Porter, Rethinking Unionism: An Alternative Vision for Northern Ireland
- 1995–96: Sebastian Barry, The Steward of Christendom
- 1997–98: Peter Hart, The IRA and its Enemies; Violence and Community in Cork, 1916-1923
- 1999–2000: David McKittrick, Seamus Kelters, Brian Feeney and Chris Thornton, Lost Lives: The Stories of the Men, Women and Children who Died as a Result of the Northern Ireland Troubles
- 2001–02: Linen Hall Library, Troubled Images Project
- 2003–04: Tom Dunne, Rebellions: Memoir, Memory and 1798
  - 2003–04 Special Award: Garret FitzGerald
- 2005–06: Richard English, Irish Freedom: The History of Nationalism in Ireland
  - 2005–06 Special Award: Michael Longley
- 2007–08: David Park, The Truth Commissioner
  - 2007–08 Special Award: Fergus D'Arcy, Remembering the War Dead
- 2009–10: Timothy Knatchbull, From a Clear Blue Sky: Surviving the Mountbatten Bomb
- 2009–10: Guy Hibbert and Oliver Hirschbiegel, Five Minutes of Heaven
- 2011–12: Julieann Campbell, Setting the Truth Free: The Inside Story of the Bloody Sunday Justice Campaign
- 2011–12: Douglas Murray, Bloody Sunday: Truth, Lies and the Saville Inquiry
  - 2011–12: Special Award: Peter Taylor (for his work covering Northern Ireland over many years)
- 2013–14: Charles Townshend, The Republic: The Fight for Irish Independence 1918-1923
  - 2013–14: Special Award, Colette Bryce, The Whole & Rain-domed Universe (in memory of Seamus Heaney)
- 2015–17: Fergal Keane, Wounds: A Memoir of Love and War
  - 2015–17: Special Award, Marianne Elliott (for her achievement in advancing the understanding of Irish history in Britain)
- 2018–19: Anna Burns, Milkman
  - 2018–19: Special Award, Katy Hayward, for her Twitter account
- 2020-21: Gail McConnell, book of poetry, The Sun is Open, published by Penned in the Margins.
- 2022-23: Lisa McGee, Derry Girls
