= Transylvania and Beyond =

Travel book by Dervla Murphy

- Cover of John Murray first edition (1992)
- Author: Dervla Murphy
- Publisher: John Murray
- Publication date: 1992
- Pages: 239 (first edition)
- ISBN: 9781780601205
- Preceded by: Cameroon with Egbert
- Followed by: The Ukimwi Road

Transylvania and Beyond is a book by Irish author Dervla Murphy. It was first published by John Murray in 1992.
