= Peter Mayne =

Peter Mayne (1908–1979) was an English travel writer who wrote about his experiences in North Africa, the Indian subcontinent and Greece. His father, C. Mayne, was Principal of Rajkumar College in Rajkot, India from 1903 to 1923, and later became guardian of the young Maharajah of Jaipur. After attending school in England, Mayne returned to India. Following Partition, he served as deputy secretary to Pakistan's Ministry of Refugees and Rehabilitation. In 1949, he moved to Morocco; four years later, his first and probably best-known book, an account of his residence in the city's Medina, was published as The Alleys of Marrakesh in England and the United States. Since the 1982 Eland edition, new editions of the book have appeared under the alternative title A Year in Marrakesh.

In The Narrow Smile: A Journey Back to the North-West Frontier Mayne's subject was a journey through the Paktun tribal lands lying between Afghanistan and Pakistan; the book is currently available for free download in different formats from the Internet Archive. The Saints of Sind, about the "pirs" or saints and dervishes of Pakistan's Sind region was followed two years later, after Mayne moved to Greece, by The Private Sea, a seemingly rambling but enchanting book about a visit of a few weeks to the island of Poros.

This spate of creativity (four books in six years) was followed by a long period of silence, broken only by the publication in 1975 of Friends in High Places : a Season in the Himalayas; the "friends" in question were Jagut and Mussoorie, sons of the exiled Rana Maharajah Marshal of Nepal, and Mayne's account of his visit to the two very different men, one living on an estate by the River Jumna in India and one in Kathmandu, is interspersed with his research into the Kot Massacre of 1846 which changed the course of Himalayan history. Peter Mayne died four years after the publication of Friends in High Places.
