= On a Shoestring to Coorg =

Travel book by Dervla Murphy

On a Shoestring to Coorg: An Experience of Southern India
- Cover of John Murray first edition (1976)
- Author: Dervla Murphy
- Publisher: John Murray
- Publication date: 1976
- Pages: 261 (first edition)
- ISBN: 0719532841
- Dewey Decimal: 915.4/8
- Preceded by: In Ethiopia with a Mule
- Followed by: Where the Indus is Young

On a Shoestring to Coorg is a book by Irish author Dervla Murphy. It was first published by John Murray in 1976. The book is usually given the subtitle An Experience of Southern India, but has been called An Experience of South India and A Travel Memoir of India.

== Summary ==
On a Shoestring to Coorg describes the 1973 journey of Murphy and her four-year-old daughter Rachel through India. They travel slowly by bus, train and boat from Mumbai to Cape Comorin, the southernmost point of India. They then return to the place they enjoyed the most, the hill province of Kodagu (Coorg). There they live simply for two months, integrating themselves with the local community.

== Publication history ==
The book was first published in 1976. Like Murphy's other earlier works, it was published by Jock Murray of the John Murray publishing house. When Jock died and his publishing house was sold, Murphy moved to Eland Books, who republished the book in 2014.
