= Without Name =

- Film poster
- Directed by: Lorcan Finnegan
- Written by: Garret Shanley
- Produced by: Brunella Cocchiglia; Rory Gilmartin
- Starring: Alan McKenna; Niamh Algar; James Browne
- Cinematography: Piers McGrail
- Edited by: Tony Cranstoun
- Music by: Gavin O'Brien; Neil O'Connor
- Production company: Lovely Productions
- Release date: 12 September 2016 (TIFF)
- Running time: 93 minutes
- Country: Ireland
- Language: English

Without Name is a 2016 Irish eco-horror film directed by Lorcan Finnegan and written by Garret Shanley. The film had its world premiere on 12 September 2016 at the Toronto International Film Festival. Without Name marks the director's feature film directorial debut and stars Alan McKenna as a land surveyor who is sent to a mysterious forest harboring a strange secret.

== Plot ==
Eric is a land surveyor that has been sent out to assess a forest in Dublin. His employer is vague on the exact reasons for the survey, but Eric willingly goes on the assignment in order to get away from his family. It also allows Eric to spend more time with his student assistant Olivia, as the two are engaged in an extramarital affair and their assignment will leave them in almost complete seclusion from the outside world. Once arrived, strange occurrences and malfunctioning equipment begin to cause Eric's mind to unravel.

== Cast ==
- Alan McKenna as Eric
- Niamh Algar as Olivia
- James Browne as Gus

== Reception ==
Critical reception for Without Name has been positive. The film holds a rating of 81% on Rotten Tomatoes, based on 16 reviews. Common praise for the film centred upon its acting and mood, prompting horror website Bloody Disgusting's Daniel Kurland to state that he was interested in viewing Finnegan's future work. Criticism for Without Name focused on what reviewers felt was a familiar and formulaic narrative.
