= Tales from Two Cities =

Travel book by Dervla Murphy

Tales from Two Cities: Travel of Another Sort
- Cover of John Murray first edition (1987)
- Author: Dervla Murphy
- Publisher: John Murray
- Publication date: 1987
- Pages: 314 (first edition)
- ISBN: 0719544351
- Preceded by: Muddling Through in Madagascar
- Followed by: Cameroon with Egbert

Tales from Two Cities: Travel of Another Sort is a book by Irish author Dervla Murphy. It was first published by John Murray in 1987.

== Summary ==
Tales from Two Cities describes Murphy's time living in Bradford and Birmingham in inter-racial communities. She discusses British race relations and includes an account of the 1985 Handsworth riots.

== Critical reception ==
In her review for The Observer, Kirsty Milne felt the book should not have been written in the first place, noting the "unfortunate" implications that arise from a white person like Murphy writing about black communities. Still, Milne thought that Murphy's efforts were well-intentioned albeit tone-deaf. On the other hand, Trevor Fishlock wrote in his review for The Daily Telegraph that the book was a "brave" and "thought-provoking" examination of the race relations in these communities.
