= The Queen of Dirt Island =

2022 novel by Donal Ryan

- Author: Donal Ryan
- Language: English
- Publication date: 2022

The Queen of Dirt Island is a 2022 novel by Irish writer Donal Ryan.

== Writing and publication ==
Ryan based Eileen Aylward, the "Queen" of the book's title, "loosely but quite faithfully" on his mother. Upon reading an early draft of the novel, Ryan's mother did not recognize the character as inspired by her. Ryan did not set out to write a book that "centers" women. Ryan attributed the book's focus on women in part due to the fact that aspects of a central character, Saoirse, came to him "easily". Ryan further attributed the focus on women to his childhood, during which women in his family and local area were strong presences.

Ryan deliberately wrote each chapter to include exactly 500 words after writing several vignettes, later included in the novel, that were roughly this length. The vignettes were inspired by the novels Mrs. Bridge and Mr. Bridge by Evan S. Connell. He began work on The Queen of Dirt Island after sharing a draft of a "much longer and much darker novel" with his publisher, which his publisher declined to edit without substantial changes. Ryan wrote The Queen of Dirt Island in 12 weeks.

== Reception ==
Amy Bloom, in a review published by The New York Times Book Review, praised the novel, referring to its short chapters as a "satisfying chain".
