= Alisha Weir =

Irish actress (born 2009)

- Born: 26 September 2009 (age 16); Dublin, Ireland
- Occupation: Actress
- Years active: 2017–present

Alisha Weir (born 26 September 2009) is an Irish actress, best known for her leading roles in the films Matilda the Musical (2022) and Abigail (2024); for the latter, she received a Critics' Choice Movie Award for Best Young Performer nomination. In April 2024, Weir was named in Forbes 30 Under 30.

== Early life ==
Alisha Weir was born and raised in Dublin, Ireland. She attended Our Lady's School and has two older sisters, both of whom participated in drama classes, inspiring her to pursue acting at a young age.

Her father manages a car dealership. She sat her Junior Cert exams in 2025.

== Career ==
Weir began her career in theatre, debuting as Ivanka in the musical Once at Dublin's Olympia Theatre in 2017. She gained attention for her singing talent on The Late Late Toy Show, where she performed Justin Timberlake's cover of "True Colors".

Her feature film debut was in the 2018 thriller Don't Leave Home, and she made her television debut as Laura in the 2019 crime drama Darklands. Weir has also appeared in stage productions of Annie, The Wizard of Oz, and Oliver!.

At eleven, Weir was cast as Matilda Wormwood in the Netflix adaptation of Matilda the Musical. She later starred in the 2024 horror film Abigail, released on 19 April 2024. For this role, she trained in ballet and performed her own stunts. Critics praised her performance, with Frank Scheck of The Hollywood Reporter describing it as "mesmerising" and "frightening and sardonically funny".

Weir is also set to voice the lead role in the animated feature The Land of Sometimes, alongside Jessica Henwick and Ewan McGregor.

Weir returned to theatre in September 2025 in a London production of Mary Page Marlowe in the title role, which she shared with four other actresses, Eleanor Worthington-Cox, Rosy McEwen, Andrea Riseborough and Susan Sarandon, at The Old Vic. She previously starred alongside Riseborough in the Matilda the Musical film adaptation, while Eleanor originated Matilda in the original West End production and won a Laurence Olivier Award for her performance.

== Personal life ==
Weir resides with her parents in Knocklyon, South Dublin, and they have a pet dog. She enjoys films such as The Parent Trap and The Black Phone, and she cites actress Saoirse Ronan as one of her idols.

== Filmography ==
=== Film ===
Year	Title	Role	Notes
2018	Don't Leave Home	Siobhan Callahan	
2018	Day Out	Rachael	Short film
2020	Ooops! The Adventure Continues	Primrose (voice)	
2022	Matilda the Musical	Matilda Wormwood	
2023	Wicked Little Letters	Nancy Gooding	
2024	Abigail	Abigail	
2024	Buffalo Kids	Mary (voice)	
2026	The Land of Sometimes	Elise (voice)	
TBA	The Last Days of Rabbit Hayes	TBA	Filming

=== Television ===
Year	Title	Role	Notes
2019	Darklands	Laura	5 episodes
2022	Fia's Fairies	Fia (voice)	Main role

=== Stage ===
Year	Title	Role	Notes
2017	Once	Ivanka	Olympia Theatre, Dublin
2017	Annie	Molly	National Concert Hall, Dublin
2018	The Wizard of Oz	Munchkin	National Concert Hall, Dublin
2019	Oliver!	Chorus	National Concert Hall, Dublin
2025	Mary Page Marlowe	Mary Page Marlowe	The Old Vic, London

== Awards and nominations ==
Year	Award	Category	Work	Result	Ref.
2022	Dublin Film Critics' Circle	Breakthrough Artist – Irish	Matilda the Musical	Won	
2023	London Film Critics' Circle	Young British/Irish Performer of the Year	Matilda the Musical	Nominated	
2023	Irish Film & Television Awards	Lead Actress – Film	Matilda the Musical	Nominated	
2024	Fangoria Chainsaw Awards	Best Supporting Performance	Abigail	Nominated	
2025	Critics' Choice Movie Awards	Best Young Performer	Abigail	Nominated	
2025	Saturn Awards	Best Performance by a Younger Actor in a Film	Abigail	Nominated	
2025	IFTA Film & Drama Awards	Lead Actress – Film	Abigail	Nominated	
