= The Spinning Heart =

2012 novel by Donal Ryan

First edition

The Spinning Heart is a social novel written by Irish novelist Donal Ryan. It was first published in 2012 by Penguin Random House. Steerforth Press published the US edition in 2013. It won the 2012 Irish Book Award for the Newcomer of the Year and Book of the Year. It won the 2013 Guardian First Book Award It also won the European Union Prize for Literature (Ireland) in 2015 It was longlisted for the 2013 Man Booker Prize and shortlisted for the International Dublin Literary Award in 2014. In 2016 it was voted Irish Book of the Decade in a poll run by Dublin Book Festival.

== Plot ==
The Spinning Heart is set in the aftermath of the collapse of the Celtic Tiger. Each chapter is told from the perspective of a different character, affected by the recession in a different way as a local property developer, Pokey Burke, goes bust and flees the country.
