= John Henry Whyte =

Irish academic (1928–1990)

John Henry Whyte (30 April 1928 in Penang, Malaya – 16 May 1990 in New York, United States) was an Irish historian, political scientist and author of books on Northern Ireland, divided societies and church-state affairs in Ireland.

== Early life ==
Whyte was born in 1928 in Penang, Malaya. His father was manager of a rubber plantation on the mainland. Whyte's family left Malaya, and returned to Europe when he was three, eventually settling in Rostrevor, County Down, Northern Ireland. The Whytes are a well known County Down family recorded in the area since at least 1713. The Whyte family is said to have come to Ireland from South Wales with Strongbow in 1170 and settled in Leinster. Whyte was educated locally, at Ampleforth and Oriel College Oxford, from which he took a degree in Modern History in 1949. Having continued studies some two years later he was awarded a B.Litt degree for further research, which was to form the nebula of his first book which was to be published in 1958.

Whyte undertook National Service during the 1950s and worked as a history teacher in his old school before being appointed lecturer in Modern History at Makerere University, Uganda. In 1962 he returned to Ireland having been appointed first 'lecturer in empirical politics' at the then expanding University College Dublin (UCD). In 1966, he wed fellow academic Dr. Jean Murray and moved to Queen's University Belfast to undertake further studies.

== Dispute with Roman Catholic Church and move to Belfast ==
In his book, Preventing the Future: Why Was Ireland So Poor for So Long?, Whyte's successor as Professor of Politics at UCD Tom Garvin gives an account as to the clerical politics prevalent at the time in UCD which caused Whyte's untimely departure:

A little later, in 1966, McQuaid provoked, possibly unintentionally, the resignation of John Whyte, a distinguished Catholic political scientist, from University College Dublin's Department of Ethics and Politics. This resignation and move to Belfast on Whyte's part in 1966 almost certainly was the unintended result of an extraordinary piece of clerical interference and bullying that rebounded upon McQuaid and on UCD. Whyte was in the midst of writing his standard history of the Catholic Church in independent Ireland, later published in 1969; at McQuaid's apparent instigation, his professor and head of Department attempted to forbid him from continuing with this work. The irony was that the resultant scholarly book, finished in Belfast rather than Dublin, deeply underestimated clerical power in the Irish state and gave the Catholic Church a rather easy ride. Another irony was that Whyte, as a Roman Catholic historian and political scientist, was apparently rather favoured by McQuaid. However in 1966 bishops didn't know they needed friends. Whyte was to come back to UCD and was professor of Ethics and Politics between 1984 and 1990. In a very real sense, McQuaid was the patriarchal and eccentric governor of Dublin Archdiocese, where one-third of the stat's population lived; he attempted to run an urban society of a million people as though it were a large feudal community.

At Queen's Whyte was to spend seventeen years as lecturer and reader, and from 1982 Professor of Irish Politics during which he sought to bring together political scientists from across the Island and develop an All-Ireland political science fellowship. From 1973 to 1974 he worked at as a research fellow at Harvard's Centre for International Affairs, and in 1975 he helped lead a team of researchers investigating the Northern Ireland conflict, then at its height. He also worked as research fellow at the Netherlands Institute for Advanced Studies during the late 1970s and was elected Member of the Royal Irish Academy in 1977, serving as Vice-President from 1989 to 1990.

== Later career ==
In 1984 he returned to University College Dublin, then faced with stringent fiscal cuts and wider problems in Irish third-level education. In his second period at UCD, Whyte led the Department, which he now headed, through a troubled period of financial cuts while supervising a reorganisation of the undergraduate curriculum. In his last years at UCD he completed his seminal work, the widely regarded Interpreting Northern Ireland. Whyte finished correcting the proofs and compiling the index of this work only a week before his death. He died whilst on his way to the United States for an academic conference in 1990.

== The John Whyte Trust Fund ==
Following his death Whyte's family, friends, and colleagues set up the John Whyte Trust Fund to continue Whyte's work, honour his memory and encourage "informed dialogue and interaction at graduate level among people who are likely to be leaders and opinion-shapers". To date the fund has awarded one fully paid scholarship and a number of part-paid scholarships as well as essay prizes annually. The fund also hosts an annual John Whyte Memorial Lecture. Speakers have included Paul Bew and Brendan O'Leary.

=== Trustees ===
The Trust Fund's trustees are as follows:

- Professor Attracta Ingram, University College Dublin
- Professor Shane O’Neill, Queen's University Belfast
- Barbara Sweetman FitzGerald
- Professor John Coakley, University College Dublin
- Paul McErlean, MCE Public Relations, Belfast
- Justice Catherine McGuinness, Dublin
- Dr. Jean Whyte
- Dr. William Whyte

== Selected works ==
- The Independent Irish Party 1850-9 (1958)
- Church and State in Modern Ireland (1971)
- Catholics in Western Democracies (1981)
- Interpreting Northern Ireland (1990) - won the Christopher Ewart-Biggs Memorial Prize
