= Cameroon with Egbert =

1990 book by Dervla Murphy

- Cover of John Murray first edition (1990)
- Author: Dervla Murphy
- Publisher: John Murray
- Publication date: 1990
- Pages: 282 (first edition)
- ISBN: 0719546893
- Preceded by: Tales from Two Cities
- Followed by: Transylvania and Beyond

Cameroon with Egbert is a book by Irish author Dervla Murphy. It was first published by John Murray in 1990.
