= The Last Right =

- Poster
- Directed by: Aoife Crehan
- Written by: Aoife Crehan
- Produced by: Paul Donovan; Pippa Cross; Casey Herbert
- Starring: Niamh Algar; Michiel Huisman; Samuel Bottomley; Colm Meaney; Brian Cox; Eleanor O'Brien; Jim Norton
- Edited by: Matt Canning
- Music by: Stephen Rennicks
- Production companies: CrossDay Productions; Deadpan Pictures; Moonlight Bay Films
- Distributed by: Fís Éireann/Screen Ireland; eOne; Northern Ireland Screen; RTÉ; LipSync
- Release date: 14 November 2019 (Cork International Film Festival)
- Running time: 106 minutes
- Countries: United Kingdom; Ireland
- Language: English

The Last Right is a 2019 comedy drama film written and directed by Aoife Crehan. The film premiered at the 2019 Cork International Film Festival.

== Plot ==
On a journey from his home in New York to his mother's funeral in Clonakilty, County Cork, Daniel Murphy meets an elderly fellow passenger who records him as his next of kin on his landing pass, and soon after dies. Daniel's autistic brother (later to be revealed as his son who had been raised by Daniel's mother) persuades him to facilitate the stranger's body brought to Rathlin Island to be buried with his brother. This becomes possible when they do a favour for a local woman, and the three have a road-trip adventure while Cork police try to stop them, believing if Daniel is not true next of kin he should not have charge of the body.

== Cast ==
- Niamh Algar as Mary Sullivan
- Michiel Huisman as Daniel Murphy
- Samuel Bottomley as Louis Murphy
- Colm Meaney as Donald Crowley
- Brian Cox as Father Reilly
- Eleanor O'Brien as Sheila O'Neill
- Michael McElhatton as Frank Delaney
- Jim Norton as Padraig
- Donna Anita Nikolaisen as the flight attendant
- Colm O'Brien as airport guard
- Clare Barrett as Teresa
- Eamon Rohan as Mr Crowley
- Julie Sharkey as Eileen Sullivan
- Helena Browne as landlady
- Barry Roe as Brian
- Catherine Byrne as Aunty Meg
- Aidan O'Hare
- Bryan Quinn

== Reception ==
On review aggregator website Rotten Tomatoes the film has a score of 67% based on reviews from 15 critics, with an average rating of 5.7/10. On Metacritic, The Last Right have a rank of 62 out of a 100 based on 4 critics, indicating "generally favorable reviews".

Donald Clarke of The Irish Times, the film is "very Irish", adding that it is "A reasonably likeable salute to a Magic Ireland we don't see much anymore". Kimberly Reyes of Film Ireland wrote "The journey's pacing is entertaining most of the way through but making comedy out of tragedy is an Irish specialty that shouldn't need to borrow any Americanness". Couple of days later, another contributor of the same publication, Liam Hanlon, praised the director and wrote that "[it's] a film that will make you eager to see what [Aoife Crehan] creates next". Brian Lloyd of entertainment.ie, called it "sweet and earnest" and compared the film to Rain Man and The Holiday. Totally Dublin thought it a "love letter to halcyon comedies Local Hero and Gregory’s Girl", describing the movie as "hilarious."

Not all critics responded positively to the film. Alan Corr of RTÉ, wrote "This Christmas road trip comedy of errors from first-time director Aoife Crehan loses its way". Irish Independent's Chris Wasser called the film "frustrating", adding that "[it] result[s] in a film that is annoyingly broad and surprisingly lazy".
