= The Thing About December =

2013 novel by Donal Ryan

- First edition (publisher: The Lilliput Press)
- Author: Donal Ryan
- Language: English
- Publisher: The Lilliput Press
- Publication date: 2013
- ISBN: 978-1-84351-272-1 (first edition)

The Thing About December is a social novel written by the Irish novelist Donal Ryan. It was first published in 2013 by The Lilliput Press in Ireland. It was published in the US in 2014 by Steerforth Press. It was shortlisted for the Irish Book Award for the Novel of the Year and longlisted for the International Dublin Literary Award in 2015.
