= Race to the Finish? =

Book by Dervla Murphy

- Cover of John Murray first edition (1981)
- Author: Dervla Murphy
- Publisher: John Murray
- Publication date: 1981
- Pages: 264 (first edition)
- ISBN: 071953884X
- Dewey Decimal: 614.8/3
- Preceded by: Wheels Within Wheels
- Followed by: Eight Feet in the Andes

Race to the Finish? The Nuclear Stakes is a book by Irish author Dervla Murphy. The book was first published in 1981. Like Murphy's other earlier works, it was published by Jock Murray of the John Murray publishing house.

Race to the Finish? is about nuclear power and the arms industry. Murphy speaks out against them, and credits the book as a turning point that led her to write more about political issues. In 1979, she stayed with friends near Three Mile Island, after America's worst nuclear accident. From then most of her books have been what she has called "mongrels", mixing travel with considerations of social, political and ethical problems.

A review in the Library Journal states

This book is avowedly anti-nuke. A well-reasoned and carefully written volume, it touches upon the safety factors in nuclear power plants, the medical consequences of nuclear radiation, the implications of nuclear proliferation, and the arms race expansion. Although some of the author's arguments can be found elsewhere, he presentation is well researched. Murphy concludes with an appreciation of the ethics and sincerity of most pro-nuclear scientists, however she may disagree with their view of nuclear energy.
