= Niamh Algar =

Irish actress (born 1992)

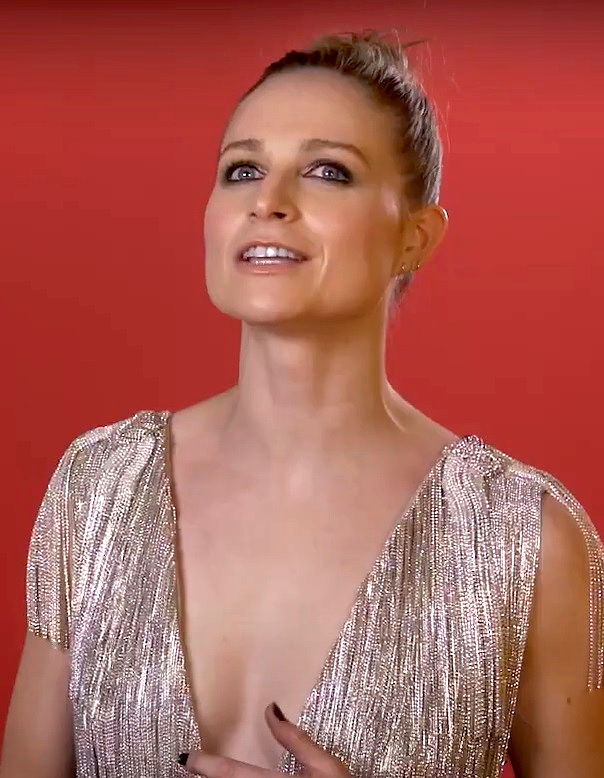
- Algar at the British Independent Film Awards 2021
- Born: 28 June 1992 (age 34); Mullingar, Westmeath, Ireland
- Education: Dublin Institute of Technology; Bow Street Academy
- Occupation: Actress
- Years active: 2011–present

Niamh Algar (born 28 June 1992) is an Irish actress. She is known for winning Best Actress in a Leading Role – TV Drama at the 2020 IFTA Film & Drama Awards for her performance in The Virtues. Other roles include MotherFatherSon, Raised by Wolves and Pure. In 2021, she appeared in Wrath of Man and Censor. For her role in Calm with Horses, she was nominated for the BAFTA Award for Best Actress in a Supporting Role.

== Early life and education ==
A native of Mullingar, Ireland, Algar is the youngest of five children. She studied design at the Dublin Institute of Technology (DIT) and graduated from the Programme of Screen Acting at the Bow Street Academy in Dublin.

== Career ==
Algar has appeared in films including Conor McMahon's From the Dark, Aoife Crehan's road trip film The Last Right, Lorcan Finnegan's Without Name and the Michael Fassbender-produced Calm With Horses.

On television she has appeared in Rose Cartwright's Pure, and as Tania in Desiree Akhavan's The Bisexual.

She was named amongst the 2019 BAFTAs Breakthrough Brits.

In 2019, Algar played Dinah in Shane Meadows's The Virtues with co-star Stephen Graham. for which she won Best Actress in a Leading Role - TV Drama at the 2020 IFTA Film & Drama Awards.

She has also appeared as Orla Green in MotherFatherSon in 2019 alongside Richard Gere, and as the wife of Travis Fimmel in the Ridley Scott directed American television series Raised by Wolves, and as Amber in the Channel 4 television series Pure.

== Filmography ==
Key
†	Denotes projects that have not yet been released

=== Film ===
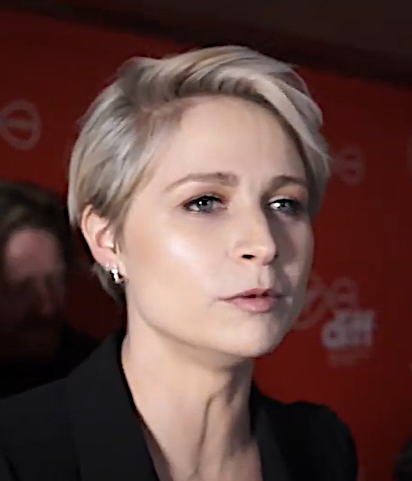
Algar in 2020

Year	Title	Role
2014	Trampoline	Maria Reidy
2014	The Light of Day	Dawn / Saoirse
2014	From the Dark	Sarah
2016	Without Name	Olivia
2017	The Drummer and the Keeper	Ingrid
2017	Seedling (short film)	Eve
2019	Calm with Horses	Ursula
2019	The Last Right	Mary Sullivan
2021	Censor	Enid Baines
2021	Wrath of Man	Dana Curtis
2022	The Wonder	Kitty
TBA	The Last Days of Rabbit Hayes†	
TBA	Luther 3 †	

=== Television ===
Year	Title	Role	Notes
2011	Reabhloid	Margaret Skinnider	Episode: "Death of a Pacifist"
2014	The Savage Eye	Various	Episode: "Why Is Ireland a Better Place to Be a Foetus Than a Baby?"
2015	Vikings	Second Woman	Episode: "Warrior's Fate"
2018	The Bisexual	Tania	Recurring role
2019	Pure	Amber Doherty	Main cast
2019	MotherFatherSon	Orla Green	Recurring role
2019	The Virtues	Dinah	Main cast
2020	Raised by Wolves	Sue	Main cast
2021	Deceit	Sadie Byrne / Lizzie James	Main cast, miniseries
2022	Suspect	Nicola	Main cast
2023	Malpractice	Dr. Lucinda Edwards	Main cast
2023	Culprits	Psycho	Recurring role
2024	Mary & George	Sandie	Miniseries
2024	Playing Nice	Maddie Wilson	Main cast
2025	The Iris Affair	Iris Nixon	Main cast
2026	Star City	Yana Akhmatova	Episode: "The Eyes"

== Awards and nominations ==
Year	Award	Category	Nominated work	Result	Ref.
2017	Dublin International Film Festival	Discovery Award	TV & Film career so far	Won	
2018	IFTA Film & Drama Awards	Best Actress in a Supporting Role – Film	The Drummer and the Keeper	Nominated	
2020	Royal Television Society	Best Actor (Female)	The Virtues	Nominated	
2020	IFTA Film & Drama Awards	Best Actress in a Supporting Role – TV Drama	Pure	Nominated	
2020	IFTA Film & Drama Awards	Rising Star	TV & Film career so far	Nominated	
2020	IFTA Film & Drama Awards	Best Actress in a Leading Role – TV Drama	The Virtues	Won	
2020	IFTA Film & Drama Awards	Best Actress in a Supporting Role – Film	Calm with Horses	Won	
2020	British Independent Film Awards	BIFA for Best Supporting Actress	Calm with Horses	Nominated	
2021	British Academy Film Awards	BAFTA Award for Best Supporting Actress – Film	Calm with Horses	Nominated	
2021	IFTA Film & Drama Awards	Best Actress in a Lead Role – TV Drama	Raised by Wolves	Nominated	
2022	British Academy Television Awards	Best Actress	Deceit	Nominated	
2022	Fangoria Chainsaw Awards	Best Lead Performance	Censor	Nominated	
