= Tomás Ó Súilleabháin =

Irish actor (born 1973)

Tomás Ó Súilleabháin (Thomas O'Sullivan; born 1973 in Dublin) is an Irish actor. He regularly appears on Irish television and in film roles. Ó Súilleabháin regularly contributes to the Irish Language arts.

== Selected filmography ==
=== Film ===
- Arracht (2019) - Director/Writer
- Song of the Sea (2014) - Spud and Bus Driver (voices; Irish version)
- Fifty Dead Men Walking (2008) - RUC Officer
- Studs (2006)
- Trouble with Sex (2005)
- Adam & Paul (2004)
- The Fixer (2004)
- Intermission (2003)
- On the Edge (2001)
- Underworld (1999)

=== Television ===
- Acceptable Risk (TV Series - 6 episodes) (2017)
- Rásaí na Gaillimhe (TV Series) (2009)
- The Clinic (2008)
- Bill (2008)
- The Running Mate (2007)
- Showbands (Drama Series) (2006)
- Fergus's Wedding (2002)
- Paths to Freedom (2003)
- On Home Ground

=== Music ===
- Showbands - Original Soundtrack (2006)
