= Full Tilt: Ireland to India with a Bicycle =

Travel book by Dervla Murphy

- Cover of John Murray first edition (1965)
- Author: Dervla Murphy
- Publisher: John Murray
- Publication date: 1965
- Pages: 235 (first edition)
- OCLC: 773284636
- Dewey Decimal: 915.4
- Followed by: Tibetan Foothold

Full Tilt is a book by Irish author Dervla Murphy, about an overland cycling trip through Europe, Iran, Afghanistan, Pakistan and India. It was first published by John Murray in 1965. The book is usually given the subtitle Ireland to India with a Bicycle, but has been called Dunkirk to Delhi by Bicycle and From Dublin to Delhi with a Bicycle.

Full Tilt has been described as both one of the best cycling books, and one of the best travel books.

== Summary ==
In 1963 Murphy set off on her first long-distance bicycle tour, a self-supported trip from Ireland to India. Taking a pistol along with other equipment aboard her Armstrong Cadet men's bicycle (named Rozinante in allusion to Don Quixote's steed, and always known as Roz), she passed through Europe during one of the worst winters in years. In Yugoslavia, Murphy began to write a journal instead of mailing letters. In Iran she used her gun to frighten off a group of thieves, and "used unprintable tactics" to escape from an attempted rapist at a police station. She received her worst injury of the journey on a bus in Afghanistan, when a rifle butt hit her and fractured three ribs; however, this only delayed her for a short while. She wrote appreciatively about the landscape and people of Afghanistan, calling herself "Afghanatical" and claiming that the Afghan "is a man after my own heart". In Pakistan, she visited Swat (where she was a guest of the last wali, Miangul Aurangzeb) and the mountain area of Gilgit. The final leg of her trip took her through the Punjab region and over the border to India towards Delhi. Her journal was later published by John Murray in 1965.

== Editions ==
- 1965: John Murray, 235pp.
- 1967: Pan Books, 271pp.
- 1983: Century (London), 235pp, ISBN 0712600752.
- 1985: Isis (Oxford), 305pp, ISBN 1850890471.
- 1991: Arrow Books, 235pp, ISBN 009995530X.
- 1995 (as Full Tilt: Dunkirk to Delhi by Bicycle): Flamingo (London), 244pp, ISBN 0006548008.
- 2004 (as Full Tilt: From Dublin to Delhi with a Bicycle): John Murray, 244pp, ISBN 0719565146.
- 2010: Eland Books, 235pp, ISBN 9781906011413.
- 2019: Naxos Books, audiobook, read by Emma Lowe, ISBN 9781781982594
