= Donal Ryan =

Irish writer (born 1976)

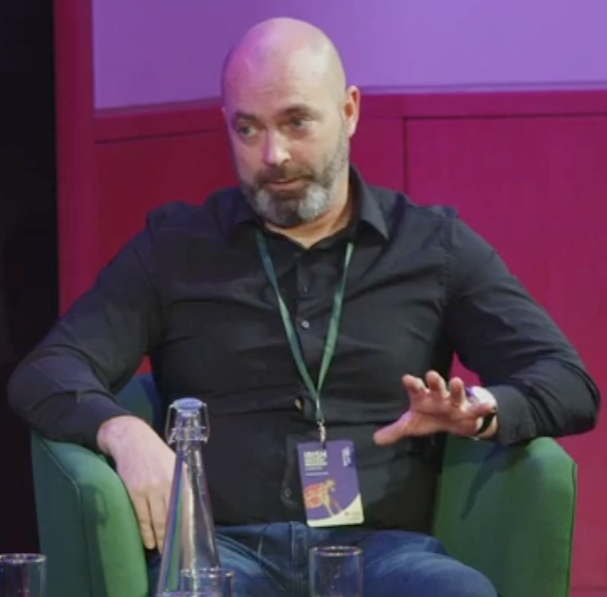
- At the British Library's Irish Writers' Weekend in 2024
- Born: 1976 (age 49–50); County Tipperary, Ireland
- Education: University of Limerick
- Notable work: The Spinning Heart (2012); The Thing About December (2013); All We Shall Know (2016); Strange Flowers (2020); Heart, Be at Peace (2024)
- Awards: European Union Prize for Literature; Guardian First Book Award; Irish Book Awards; Orwell Prize

Donal Ryan (born 1976) is an Irish writer. He has published eight novels and one short story collection. In 2016, novelist and playwright Sebastian Barry described Ryan in The Guardian as "the king of the new wave of Irish writers". All of Ryan's novels have been number-one bestsellers in Ireland. His novel Heart, Be at Peace won the 2025 Orwell Prize for Political Fiction.

== Biography ==
Donal Ryan was born outside Nenagh, County Tipperary, Ireland, in 1976. He holds a degree in law from the University of Limerick, where he now lectures in Creative Writing. He worked for the National Employment Rights Authority until April 2014. He is married and lives in Castletroy, County Limerick, with his wife and two children.

Ryan has won numerous awards for his fiction, among them the European Union Prize for Literature, the Guardian First Book Award and six Irish Book Awards, and has been shortlisted for several more, including the Costa Book Award and the International IMPAC Dublin Literary Award. In September 2021, he became the first Irish writer to be awarded the Jean-Monnet Prize for European Literature.

His debut novel, The Spinning Heart, was longlisted for the Man Booker Prize in 2013, and his fourth novel, From a Low And Quiet Sea, was longlisted in 2018. The Spinning Heart was voted Irish Book of the Decade in 2016 in a nationwide poll run by the Dublin Book Festival.

Ryan's first two novels, The Spinning Heart (2012) and The Thing About December (2013), were between them rejected 47 times before being accepted for publication.

The Thing About December (written before The Spinning Heart) was published in 2013 and was adapted into an Irish-language film, Foscadh, in 2020. It was also adapted for the stage by Decadent Theatre Company in 2019. The Spinning Heart was adapted by Articulate Anatomy Theatre Company in 2017 and staged at the Gaiety Theatre in Dublin.

Ryan's books have been translated into more than twenty languages.

In June 2025, he won the Orwell Prize for political fiction for his novel Heart, Be at Peace.

== Works ==
- The Spinning Heart (2012)
- The Thing About December (2013)
- A Slanting of the Sun: Stories (2015)
- All We Shall Know (Sept 2016)
- From a Low and Quiet Sea (2018)
- Strange Flowers (2020)
- The Queen of Dirt Island (2022)
- Heart, Be at Peace (2024)
- Where Are the Kings (2026)

== Recognition ==
- 2012: Irish Book Awards, winner, Newcomer of the Year (The Spinning Heart)
- 2012: Irish Book Awards, winner, Book of the Year (The Spinning Heart)
- 2013: Irish Book Awards, shortlist, Novel of the Year (The Thing About December)
- 2013: Man Booker Prize, longlist (The Spinning Heart)
- 2013: Guardian First Book Award, winner (The Spinning Heart)
- 2014: International Dublin Literary Award, shortlist (The Spinning Heart)
- 2015: European Union Prize for Literature (Ireland), winner (The Spinning Heart)
- 2015: Irish Book Awards, winner, Short Story of the Year (A Slanting of the Sun: Stories)
- 2016: Irish Book Awards, shortlist, Novel of the Year (All We Shall Know)
- 2016: Dublin Book Festival, winner, Irish Book of the Decade (The Spinning Heart)
- 2017: Prix Jean Monnet de Littérature Européenne, shortlist (The Thing About December - French translation)
- 2018: Man Booker Prize, longlist (From a Low and Quiet Sea)
- 2018: Irish Book Awards, shortlist, Novel of the Year (From a Low and Quiet Sea)
- 2018: Costa Book Awards, shortlist (From a Low and Quiet Sea)
- 2019: Royal Society of Literature's Ondaatje Prize, longlist (From a Low and Quiet Sea)
- 2020: Irish Book Awards, winner, Novel of the Year (Strange Flowers)
- 2021: Prix Jean Monnet de Littérature Européene, winner (From a Low and Quiet Sea - French translation)
- 2021: Dalkey Literary Awards, shortlist
- 2024: Irish Book Awards, winner, Novel of the Year (Heart, Be at Peace)
- 2024: Irish Book Awards, winner, overall Book of the Year (Heart, Be at Peace)
- 2024: Nero Book Awards, shortlist (Heart, Be at Peace)
- 2025: Orwell Prize, winner, Political Fiction (Heart, Be at Peace)
