= Arracht =

2019 Irish period drama film by Tomás Ó Súilleabháin

- Theatrical release poster
- Directed by: Tomás Ó Súilleabháin
- Screenplay by: Tom Sullivan
- Produced by: Cúán Mac Conghail
- Starring: Dónall Ó Héalaí; Saise Ní Chuinn; Dara Devaney
- Cinematography: Kate McCullough
- Edited by: Mary Crumlish
- Music by: Kíla
- Production company: Macalla Teoranta
- Distributed by: Break Out Pictures
- Release dates: 29 November 2019 (Tallinn Black Nights Film Festival); 6 November 2020 (Ireland)
- Running time: 86 minutes
- Country: Ireland
- Language: Irish

Arracht (Irish pronunciation: [ˈaɾˠəxt̪ˠ]; 'Monster') is a 2019 Irish-language period drama film directed and written by Tomás Ó Súilleabháin set during the Great Famine of Ireland. It was selected as the Irish entry for the Best International Feature Film at the 93rd Academy Awards, but it was not nominated.

== Plot ==
Connemara, 1845. Colmán Sharkey lives with his wife and infant son on the Atlantic coast where they subsist on the fish he catches with his brother Seán and the potatoes grown on the family farm. He is persuaded to take on Patsy Kelly, who has recently left the Royal Navy under suspicious circumstances, as a farmhand and fisherman. Word has spread of a blight affecting the potato crop as far as the Midlands, leading to widespread famine. The blight soon reaches Connemara, where the potato crops wither in the fields. The local landlord increases rents and sends two armed men to Colmán's home to collect. Patsy disarms one of them but is pressured by Colmán into relinquishing the gun as Colmán requests a meeting with the landlord.

At the landlord's estate, Colmán unsuccessfully tries to persuade him not to raise rents due to the famine devastating the country. Patsy wanders off where he encounters the two collection agents and the landlord's daughter. He murders all three before being discovered by Colmán, who is shocked by what he finds and notices a frightened young girl has witnessed the scene. Patsy kills the landlord, leading to a confrontation with the Sharkey brothers in which Seán is fatally stabbed. Enraged, Colmán brutally beats Patsy and leaves him for dead.

Two years pass during which Colmán loses his wife and son to the effects of the famine. Living in a cave by the shore and haunted by visions of his family, he attempts suicide by drowning but is compelled to surface. Later, he discovers a sick young girl, Kitty, in what used to be his cottage. He nurses her back to health and recognises her as the girl who witnessed Patsy's murder spree. Locals desperate for Colmán's catch stab him in a confrontation at the cottage. As he recovers, he teaches Kitty how to row, catch fish, and treat wounds. Time passes and the bond between Colmán and Kitty deepens. Kitty despairs at not being able to help the starving people she encounters but Colmán reminds her that their own meagre food supply is dependent on access to the sea and they will be unable to fish when winter comes. Kitty strikes up a friendship with a local girl and her mother, whom Colmán quietly persuades to adopt Kitty and take her to the mainland to ensure her survival once winter arrives.

It is then revealed that Patsy survived Colmán's assault and has framed him for the landlord's murder. Allied with a British agent and a police constable, he tracks down Colmán to his old cottage where he recognises Kitty and takes her hostage as the agent arrests and beats Colmán. When the agent is distracted by Kitty's cries, Colmán beats him to death and subdues the police constable, taking his gun in the process. He confronts Patsy, who threatens to kill Kitty. She stabs him in the leg using a knife previously gifted to her by Colmán, allowing him to strangle Patsy to death while a traumatised Kitty suffers flashbacks to the murders she witnessed. As Patsy dies, Colmán and Kitty embrace.

== Cast ==
- Dónall Ó Héalaí as Colmán Sharkey
- Saise Ní Chuinn as Kitty
- Dara Devaney as Patsy
- Eóin Ó Dubhghaill as Seán
- Dudura Ó Gionnáin as Dónal
- Michael Ó Chonfhlaola as P. J.
- Siobhán O'Kelly as Áine
- Eimear Ní Mháille as Mary
- Seán T. Ó Meallaigh as Séamus
- Conal Ó Céidigh as Dan
- Michael McElhatton as a lieutenant
- Elaine O'Dwyer as Margaret
- Elise Brennan as Kate
- Pádraic Breathnach as Fr. Joachin
- Peter Coonan as Bailey
- Diarmuid de Faoite as Joe Pat
- Michelle Beamish as Bríd

== Production ==
Location filming took place in Lettermullan, County Galway. Produced by Dublin-based television and film production company Macalla Teoranta, Arracht was financially backed by Screen Ireland, the Broadcasting Authority of Ireland, and TG4. Executive producers Brendan McCarthy and John McDonnell of Fantastic Films.

== Release ==
Arracht received its world premiere at the Tallinn Black Nights Film Festival in Estonia on 29 November 2019.

The Irish premiere was at the Dublin International Film Festival on 28 February 2020. The film was supposed to receive its general release on 3 April 2020, but the COVID-19 pandemic led to the closure of all cinemas. Arracht had its UK premiere at the Glasgow Film Festival on 8 March 2020, and won the Audience Award. Arracht screened at the online editions of the 66th Taormina Film Fest in Italy, and the 32nd Galway Film Fleadh on Sunday, 12 July. It finally received a general release on 6 November 2020.

It made €164,000 in Ireland and United Kingdom box office. It was, for a year, the highest grossing Irish spoken film until it was passed by The Quiet Girl in 2022.

=== Critical response ===
Screen Daily said that "although Arracht could be improved by some shifts in emphasis to give the latter half of the plot more clarity and emphasis, [Ó Súilleabháin] still pulls off an authentic drama/thriller, with a powerful impact."

The Irish Times wrote that it was "unmissable" and "beautifully crafted." Little White Lies included Arracht in their list, "10 highlights from the Tallinn Black Nights Film Festival 2019" at no. 2, and wrote "this well acted and beautifully scored film is born of the land itself", calling the film "an austere and implacable drama about finding hope when all else is lost". A review on Filmuforia.co.uk called Arracht "an enigmatic mood piece" with a "brilliant cast" and a "haunting intensity of its remote countryside setting in the coastal region of Connemara". Film Ireland called it a "fiercely impressive feature debut" from director Tom Sullivan, one that has a "real feeling of authenticity". Scannain gave the film a 4.0 score out of 5, describing a "phenomenal cast ... with stellar performances from the lead duo" (Ó Héalaí and Ní Chuinn). Into Films declared Arracht "a searingly austere film which deserves the widest possible audience", after its UK Premiere at Glasgow Film Festival.

=== Accolades ===
Year	Award	Category	Recipients	Outcome
2020	Dublin International Film Festival	Best Irish Film	Arracht	Won
2020	Dublin International Film Festival	Aer Lingus Discovery Award	Dónall Ó Héalaí	Won
2020	Glasgow Film Festival	Audience Award	Arracht	Won
2020	American Golden Picture International Film Festival	Best Feature Film	Arracht	Won
2020	American Golden Picture International Film Festival	Best Director	Tom Sullivan	Won
2020	American Golden Picture International Film Festival	Best Cinematographer	Kate McCullough	Won
2020	American Golden Picture International Film Festival	Best Child Actress	Saise Ní Chuinn	Won
2020	American Golden Picture International Film Festival	Best Lead Actor	Dónall Ó Héalaí	Honorable Mention
2020	Irish Film & Television Academy Awards (IFTA)	Best Film 2020	Arracht	Nominated
2020	Irish Film & Television Academy Awards (IFTA)	Best Director - Film	Tom Sullivan	Nominated
2020	Irish Film & Television Academy Awards (IFTA)	Best Script - Film	Tom Sullivan	Nominated
2020	Irish Film & Television Academy Awards (IFTA)	Actor in a Leading Role - Film	Dónall Ó Héalaí	Nominated
2020	Irish Film & Television Academy Awards (IFTA)	Actor in a Supporting Role - Film	Dara Devaney	Nominated
2020	Irish Film & Television Academy Awards (IFTA)	Best Cinematography	Kate McCullough	Nominated
2020	Irish Film & Television Academy Awards (IFTA)	Best Costume Design	Clodagh Deegan	Nominated
2020	Irish Film & Television Academy Awards (IFTA)	Best Original Music	Kíla	Won
2020	Irish Film & Television Academy Awards (IFTA)	Best Production Design	Padraig O'Neill	Nominated
2020	Irish Film & Television Academy Awards (IFTA)	Best Sound	Peter Blayney, Alan Scully, Brendan Rehill	Won
2020	Irish Film & Television Academy Awards (IFTA)	Best Makeup & Hair	Niamh O'Loan, Niamh Glynn	Nominated
	Kimolos International Film Festival	Golden Tree Award (Best Film)	Arracht	Won
	British & Irish Film Festival Luxembourg	Critics Choice Award	Arracht	Won
	Gradaim Cumarsáide @ Oireachtas na Gaeilge	Scannán na Bliana	Arracht	Won

== See also ==
- List of submissions to the 93rd Academy Awards for Best International Feature Film
- List of Irish submissions for the Academy Award for Best International Feature Film
