= The Lilliput Press =

Irish book publisher

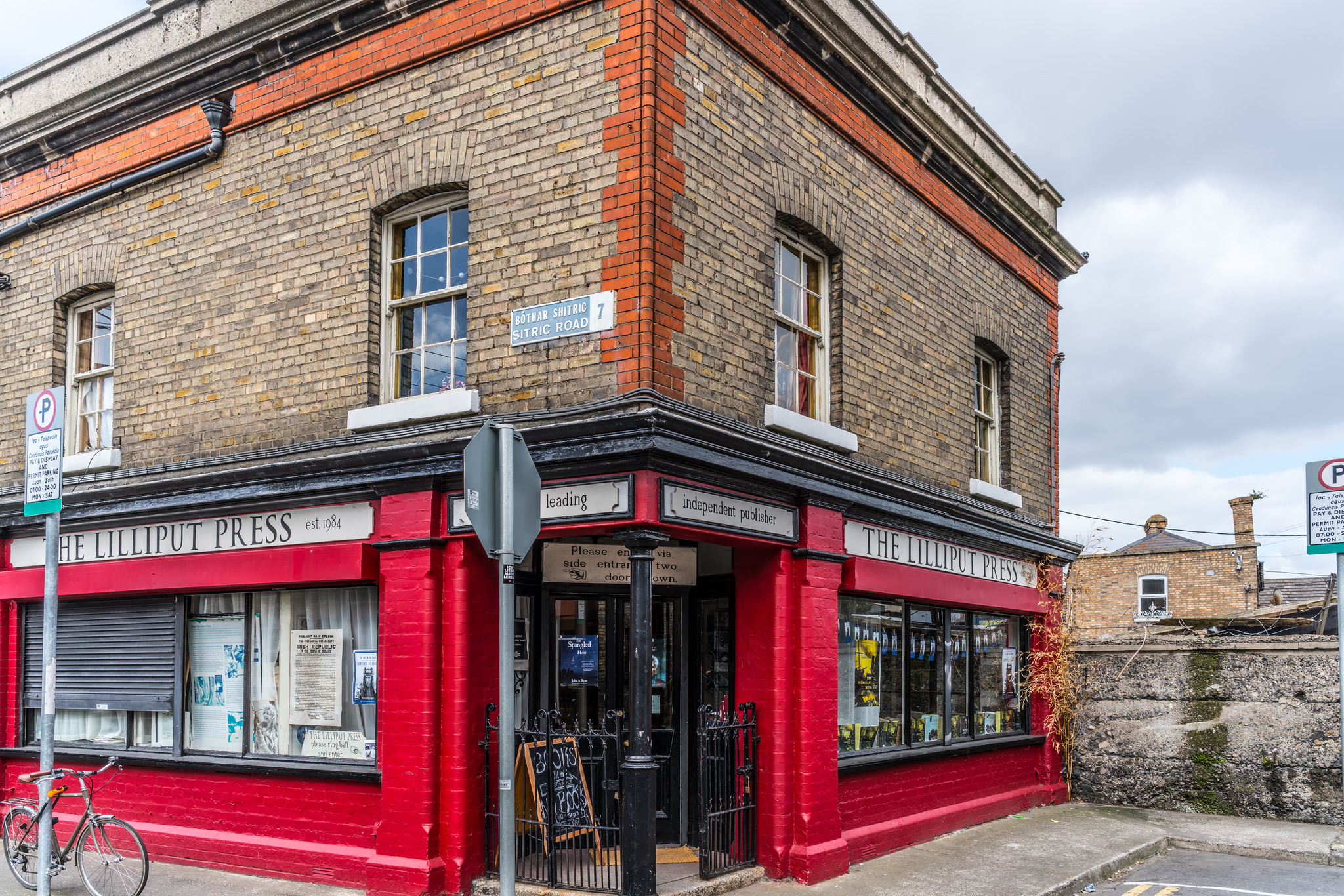
- Lilliput Press in Stoneybatter, Dublin
- Founded: 1984
- Founder: Antony Farrell
- Country of origin: Ireland
- Headquarters location: Arbour Hill Stoneybatter; Dublin
- Distribution: Gill (Ireland); Dufour Editions (USA)
- Publication types: Books
- Official website: lilliputpress.ie

The Lilliput Press is an Irish publishing house, founded in 1984 by Antony Farrell. Since its inception, Lilliput has published over 600 titles, ranging from art and architecture, autobiography and memoir, biography and history, ecology and environmentalism, to essays and literary criticism, philosophy, current affairs and popular culture, fiction, drama and poetry.

== Authors ==
- John Moriarty
- Desmond Hogan
- Flann O'Brien
- Kevin Power
- Donal Ryan
- Rob Doyle
