= The Virtues (TV series) =

British TV drama

- Genre: Drama
- Written by: Shane Meadows; Jack Thorne
- Directed by: Shane Meadows
- Starring: Stephen Graham; Niamh Algar; Helen Behan; Frank Laverty; Mark O'Halloran; Liam Carney; Niamh Cusack
- Composer: PJ Harvey
- Country of origin: United Kingdom
- Original language: English
- No. of series: 1
- No. of episodes: 4

Production
- Producers: Mark Herbert; Nickie Sault
- Running time: 43–75 minutes
- Production companies: Warp Films; Big Arty Productions

Original release
- Network: Channel 4
- Release: 15 May – 5 June 2019

The Virtues is a 2019 British four-part drama directed by Shane Meadows, who co-wrote it with Jack Thorne. Released in four parts. It stars Stephen Graham, Niamh Algar, and Helen Behan. Its soundtrack was composed by PJ Harvey.

== Plot ==
Joseph's life breaks down when his ex-wife and young son move to Australia, leaving him behind in England. After a drinking binge, he uses the last of his money to return to his native Ireland and seek out his estranged sister Anna, whom he has not seen in over 30 years. Doing so causes him to unearth a horrific incident from his past, the memory of which he has long repressed.

Meadows has explained that the drama is based partly on his own experience of being sexually assaulted as a child and repressing the memory. He said to The Guardian that "From my point of view, this was a chance for me to create a safe space, to face my abuser. All I wanted was to be able to sit down with this guy, via Stephen Graham."

== Cast ==
- Stephen Graham as Joseph
- Niamh Algar as Dinah
- Helen Behan as Anna
- Frank Laverty as Michael
- Mark O'Halloran as Craigy
- Deirdre Donnelly as Susan
- Niamh Cusack as Janine
- Juliet Ellis as Debbie
- Jermaine Liburd (formerly Vauxhall Jermaine) as David

== Episodes ==
=== Episode 1 ===
When his ex-partner emigrates to Australia with their son and her new partner David, Joseph suffers a relapse of his alcoholism. Waking up hungover and distraught, he uses the last of his money to return to his hometown in Ireland and begins searching for answers about the troubled past he has repressed.

=== Episode 2 ===
Joseph arrives in Ireland and reconnects with his sister Anna, who he has not seen since he ran away from an orphanage, aged 9. Anna's husband Michael gives Joseph work on a building site where he meets fellow labourer Craigy. Recognising Joseph from his brief time at the orphanage, he suggests they meet up, but Joseph is reluctant.

=== Episode 3 ===
Joseph visits the orphanage but the vivid memories it brings to the surface turn him to alcohol once again. Waking up in the middle of the night he finds a connection with Michael's sister Dinah and the two begin to kiss. The pair are interrupted by Anna who gives them both a severe scolding and tells them to keep away from each other. The next morning Anna warns Joseph off Dinah, who she says is carrying a lot of baggage of her own. Craigy offers to help Joseph talk through the latter's experiences at the orphanage but, still unable to remember the details of his time there, Joseph reacts with suspicion and distaste to the idea, lashing out verbally at Craigy.

Dinah decides to try and reconnect with the baby she gave up for adoption when she was 15 and secures a meeting with the woman who managed the adoption process. She begins to write a letter to the boy, who she named Finn, explaining why she felt she had to give him away.

=== Episode 4 ===
Joseph and Dinah begin to learn more about each other's past. Although initially determined not to act upon their feelings for each other, the temptation becomes too much. However, Joseph becomes nervous and then suffers a severe panic attack, resulting in him being admitted to hospital. The next morning, Joseph reveals to Anna that the panic attack was brought on by his realisation that he was raped at the orphanage by a teenage boy.

Dinah meets the woman who arranged Finn's adoption but is told that the boy's new family do not want her to re-enter his life. She tells her that the boy sent a number of letters and drawings to Dinah some years previously but was distraught when he did not receive any replies. Dinah insists that she never received any of the correspondence and tells the woman that they must have been intercepted and destroyed by her mother, who did not wish to be reminded of her daughter's teenage pregnancy.

Joseph apologises to Craigy for lashing out and talks to him about the details of his childhood rape. Craigy tells Joseph that he had also been raped by the same teen at the orphanage, Damon, who later coerced Craigy into luring Joseph into being a new victim of his abuse. Joseph forgives Craigy but demands to know Damon's address. Dinah, in despair after learning the reasons behind being denied access to Finn, desperately tries to contact Michael but he does not answer her calls. In the absence of Michael's guidance, Dinah sets off to confront her mother at her home while Joseph pays a visit to Damon.

In the final scenes, Joseph finds Damon living in a run-down house, terminally ill. He seeks answers but Damon is unapologetic, citing his own childhood abuse at the hands of others. Joseph admits that he came to kill him but he now feels no need, as he can carry on living his life with his newfound family, while Damon will die alone in misery. Joseph clutches at him but then kisses him on the forehead and releases his hold, telling him that he forgives him, and then leaves. It is shown however that after reliving the abuse of the past, and his role in it, Craigy has hanged himself in his home.

Meanwhile, Dinah confronts her mother about her actions and they reveal their mutual hatred. Dinah's mother admits that she burned Finn's letters, feeling that showing them to Dinah would have needlessly brought back to the surface an issue that she had wanted to keep buried. After an intense argument, Dinah is overcome with rage and strangles her mother to death.

== Reception ==
The series received a highly positive reception. A 5-star review of the finale in The Guardian stated that "the skill of Meadows was evident throughout" the series and praised his "masterful handling of such painful material". The Guardian also ranked it at No. 5 on their list of the "Top 50 Best TV Shows of 2019". Another 5-star review from The Daily Telegraph called the series a "dramatic masterpiece".
