= Eland Books =

British travel book publisher

- Founded: 1982; 44 years ago
- Founder: John Hatt
- Country of origin: United Kingdom
- Headquarters location: London
- Distribution: Macmillan
- Publication types: Books
- Imprints: Sickle Moon Books; Baring & Rogerson Books
- Official website: www.travelbooks.co.uk

Eland Books is an independent London-based publishing house founded in 1982 with the aim of republishing and reviving classic travel books that have fallen out of print over time.

Its list currently runs to around 160 titles and is highly regarded by critics and book reviewers. Eland authors include:

- Nigel Barley
- Nicolas Bouvier
- Evliya Çelebi
- Winston Churchill
- E.M. Forster
- Martha Gellhorn
- Lucie, Lady Duff-Gordon
- W.H. Hudson
- Arthur Koestler
- Peter Levi
- Norman Lewis
- Gavin Maxwell
- Peter Mayne
- Mary Wortley Montagu
- Jan Morris
- Dervla Murphy
- Irfan Orga
- Tony Parker
- Dilys Powell
- Jonathan Raban
- Leonard Woolf
- Ronald Wright

Eland began from an office in the attic of John Hatt, a former magazine travel editor, in a Victorian end-of-terrace house at 53 Eland Road, in Battersea, south-west London.

It is run today by former travel guidebook authors Barnaby Rogerson and his wife Rose Baring. Although its list has diversified into biography and fiction, the majority of the titles remain tales of travel.

Rogerson explained that Eland's mission is "to celebrate the diversity of the world, offering up 'anthropology-lite' under the blanket cover of preserving the best travel writing as well as to preserve the stories about past societies that have been destroyed by the modern world – precious little building blocks of other ways in which to live, from which a better world may one day be constructed by our heirs."

"Eland offers an armchair way of getting to know our fellow earthlings", added co-publisher Rose Baring.

== See also ==
- Eland Books books
