= IFTA Award for Best Supporting Actor – Film =

Irish film industry award

IFTA Award for Supporting Actor – Film
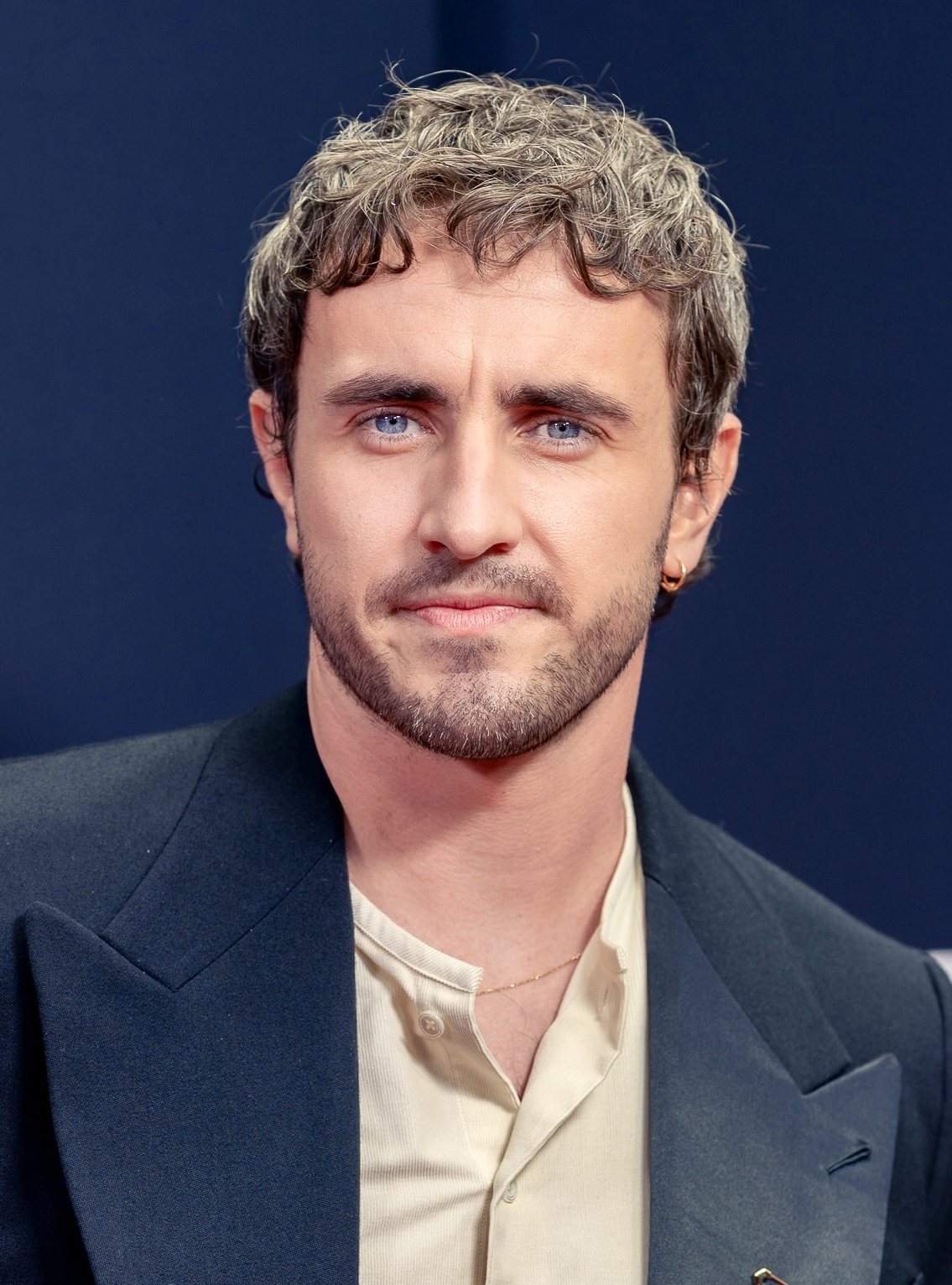
- The 2025 recipient: Paul Mescal
- Awarded for: Best Performance by an Actor in a Supporting Role
- Country: Ireland
- Presented by: Irish Film & Television Academy (IFTA)
- First award: 2003
- Most recent winner: Paul Mescal, Hamnet (2026)
- Website: ifta.ie

The IFTA Award for Supporting Actor – Film is an award presented annually by the Irish Film & Television Academy (IFTA). It has been presented since the 3rd Irish Film & Television Awards ceremony in 2005 to an Irish actor who has delivered an outstanding performance in a supporting role in a feature film. For the first and second ceremonies, supporting performances for film and television were combined into one category.

Four actors — Liam Cunningham, Domhnall Gleeson, Paul Mescal and David Wilmot — have won the award twice. The record for most nominations is five, held by both Colin Farrell and Ciarán Hinds. Mescal is the award's most recent winner, winning his second award for his performance in Hamnet (2025).

== Eligibility ==
The award is exclusively open to Irish actors. The rules define an Irish person as follows:

- Born in Ireland (32 counties) or
- Have Irish Citizenship or
- Be full-time resident in Ireland (minimum of 3 years)

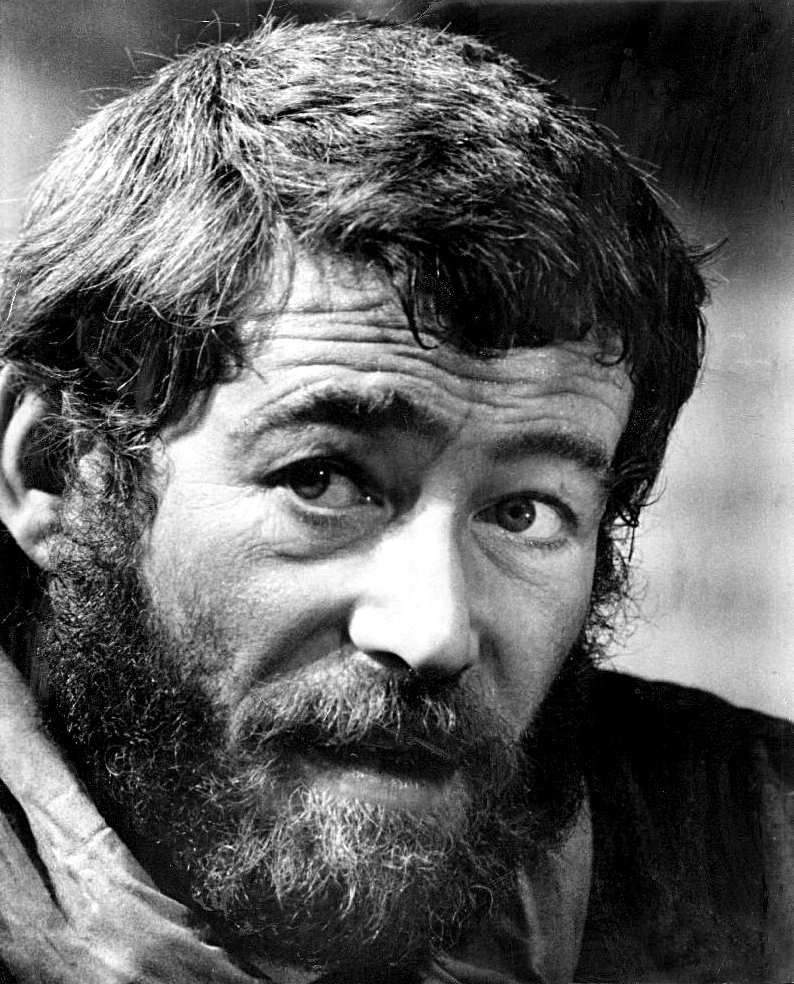
Peter O'Toole won for Troy (2004).

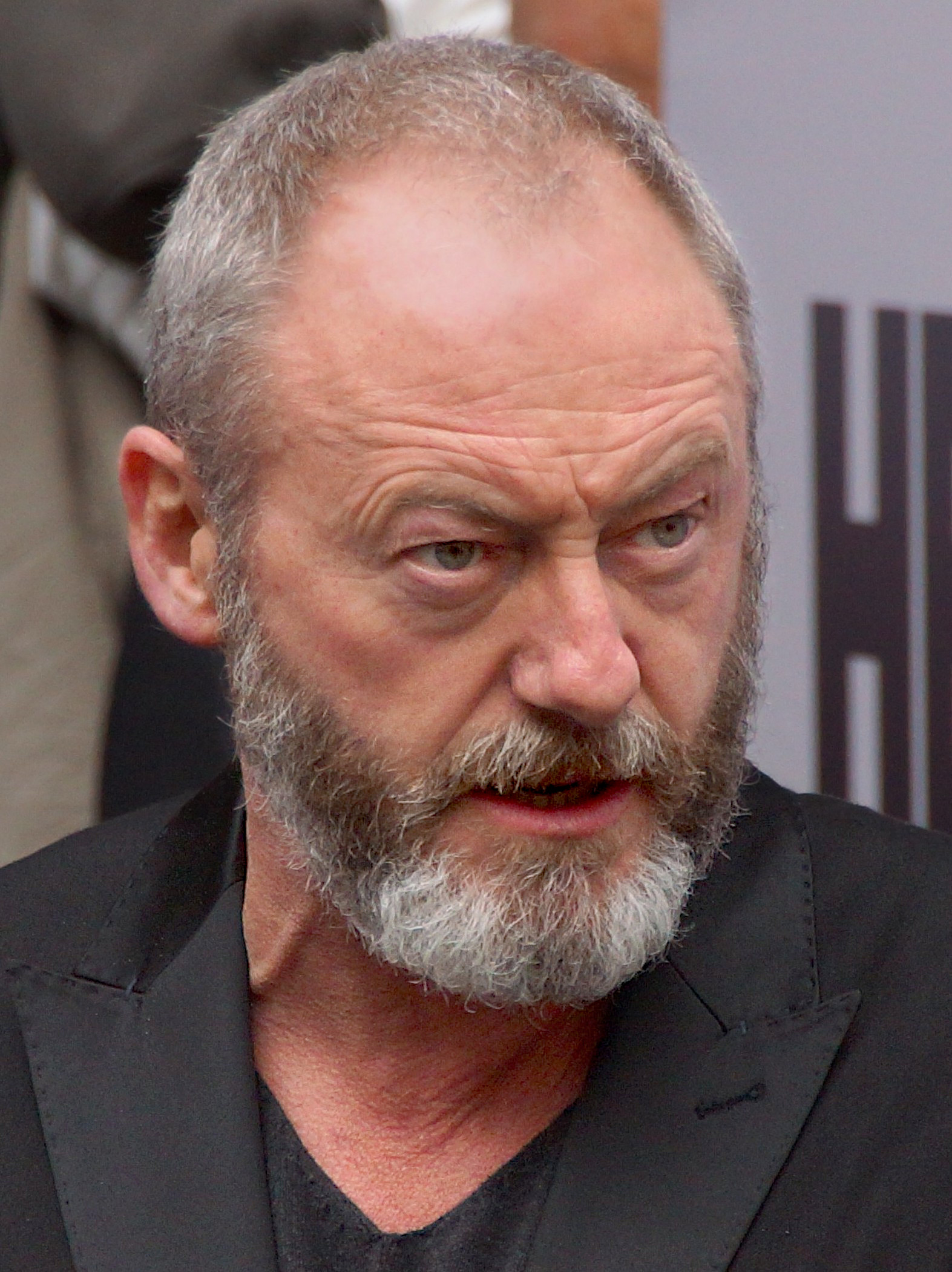
Liam Cunningham won twice, for The Wind That Shakes the Barley (2006) and Hunger (2008).

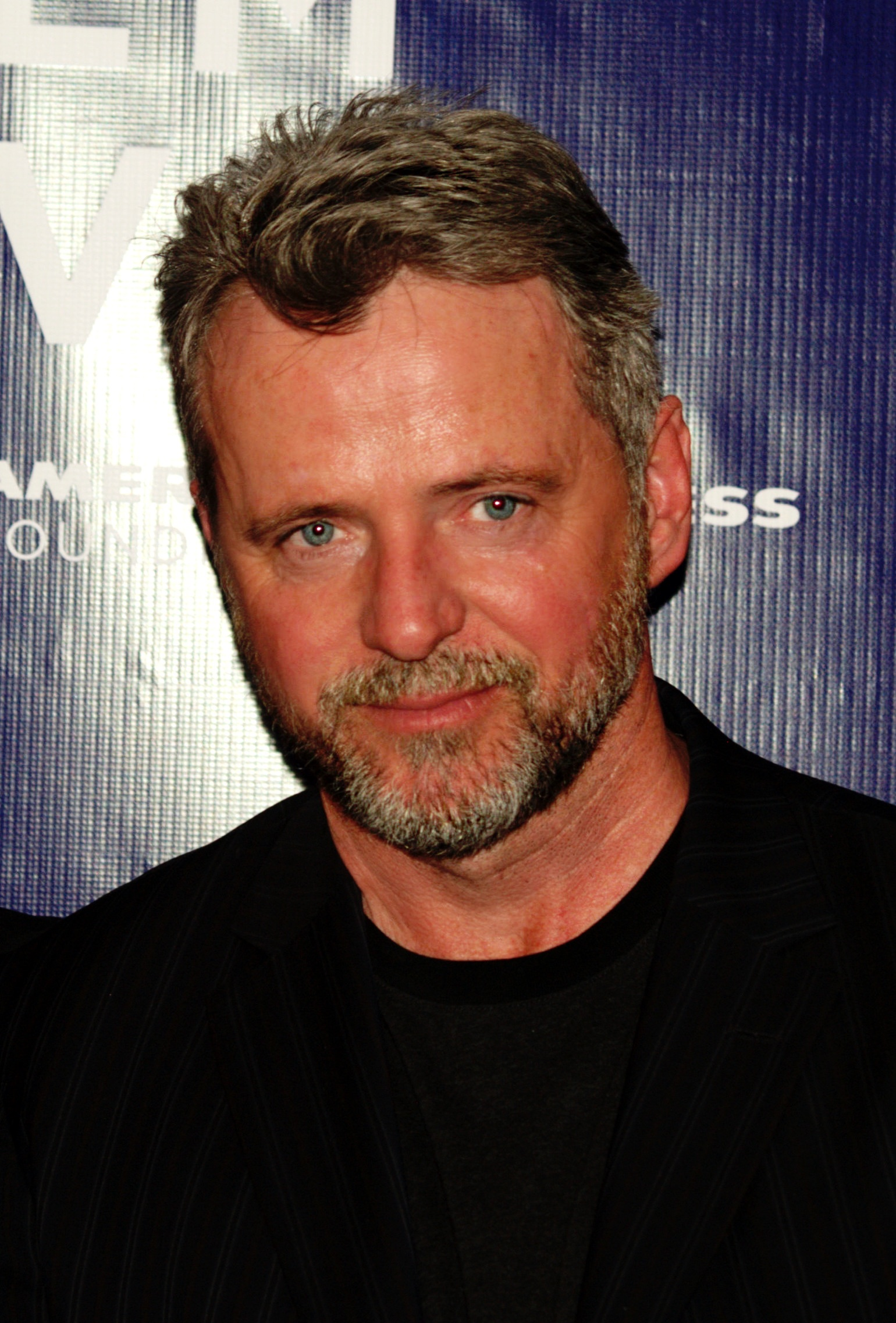
Aidan Quinn won for The Eclipse (2009).

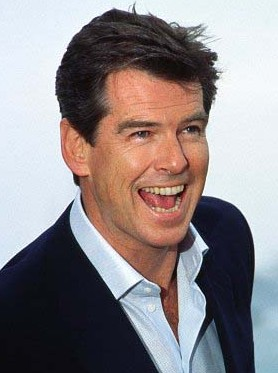
Pierce Brosnan won for The Ghost (2010).

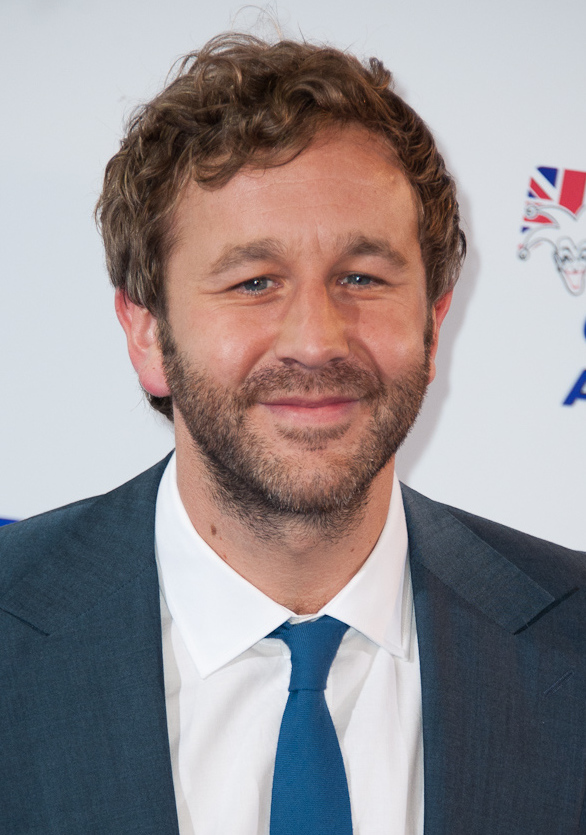
Chris O'Dowd won for Bridesmaids (2011).

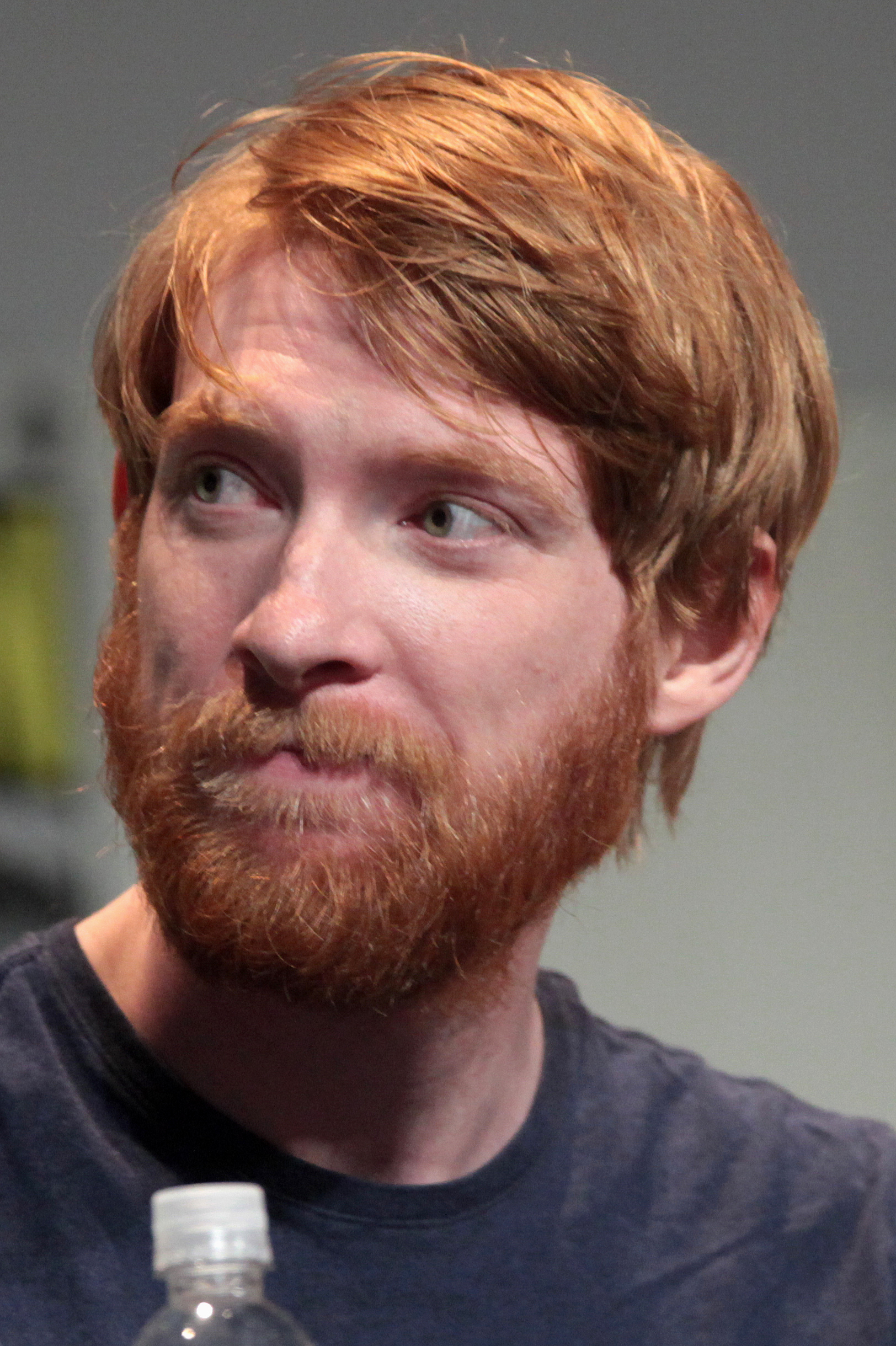
Domhnall Gleeson won twice, for Anna Karenina (2012) and Frank (2014).

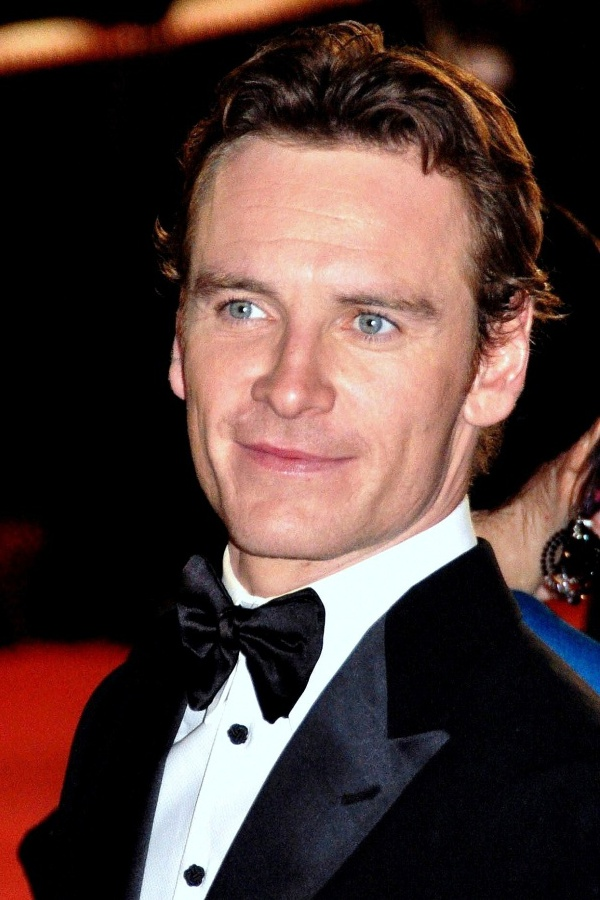
Michael Fassbender won for 12 Years a Slave (2013).

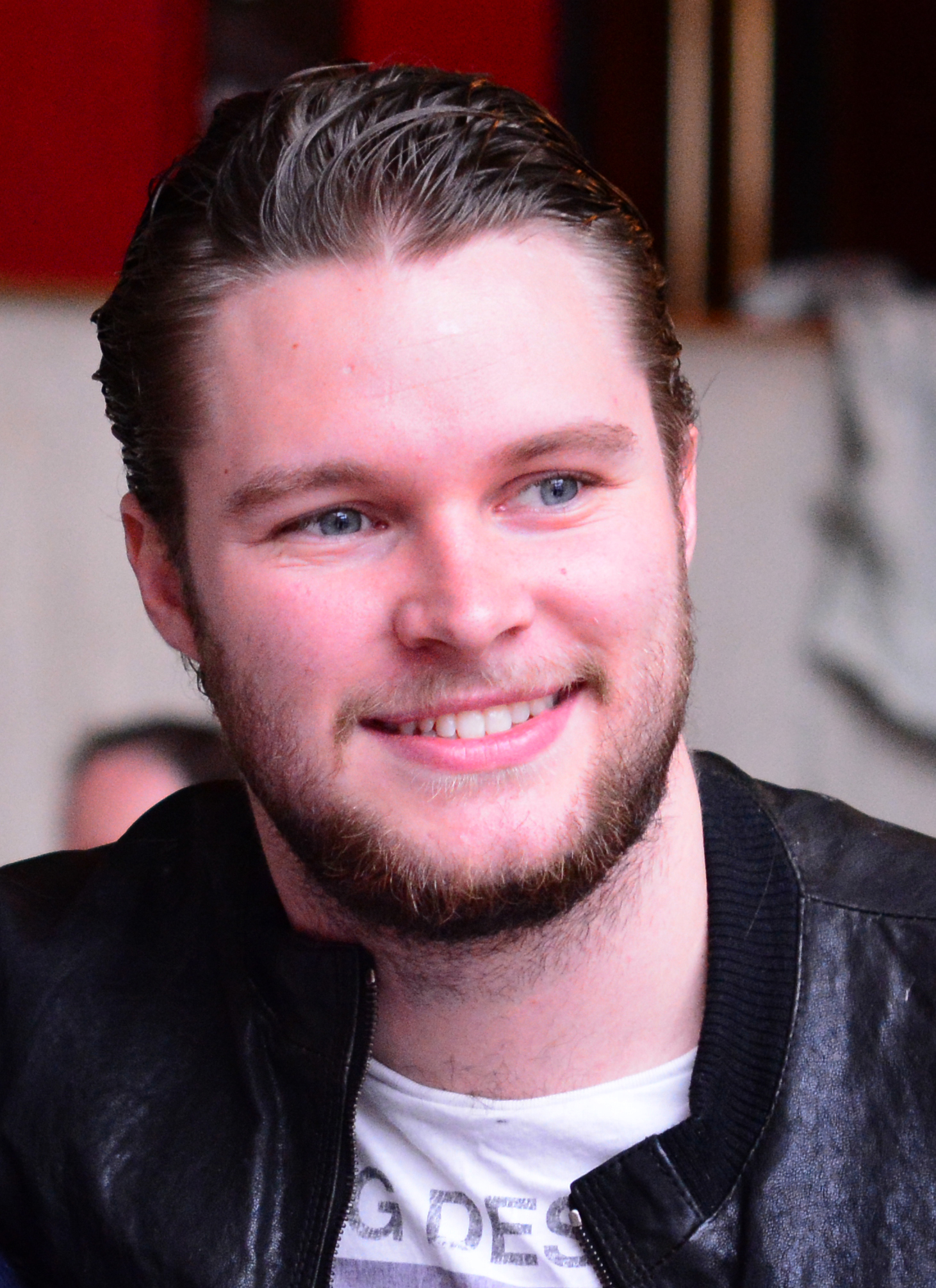
Jack Reynor won for Sing Street (2016).

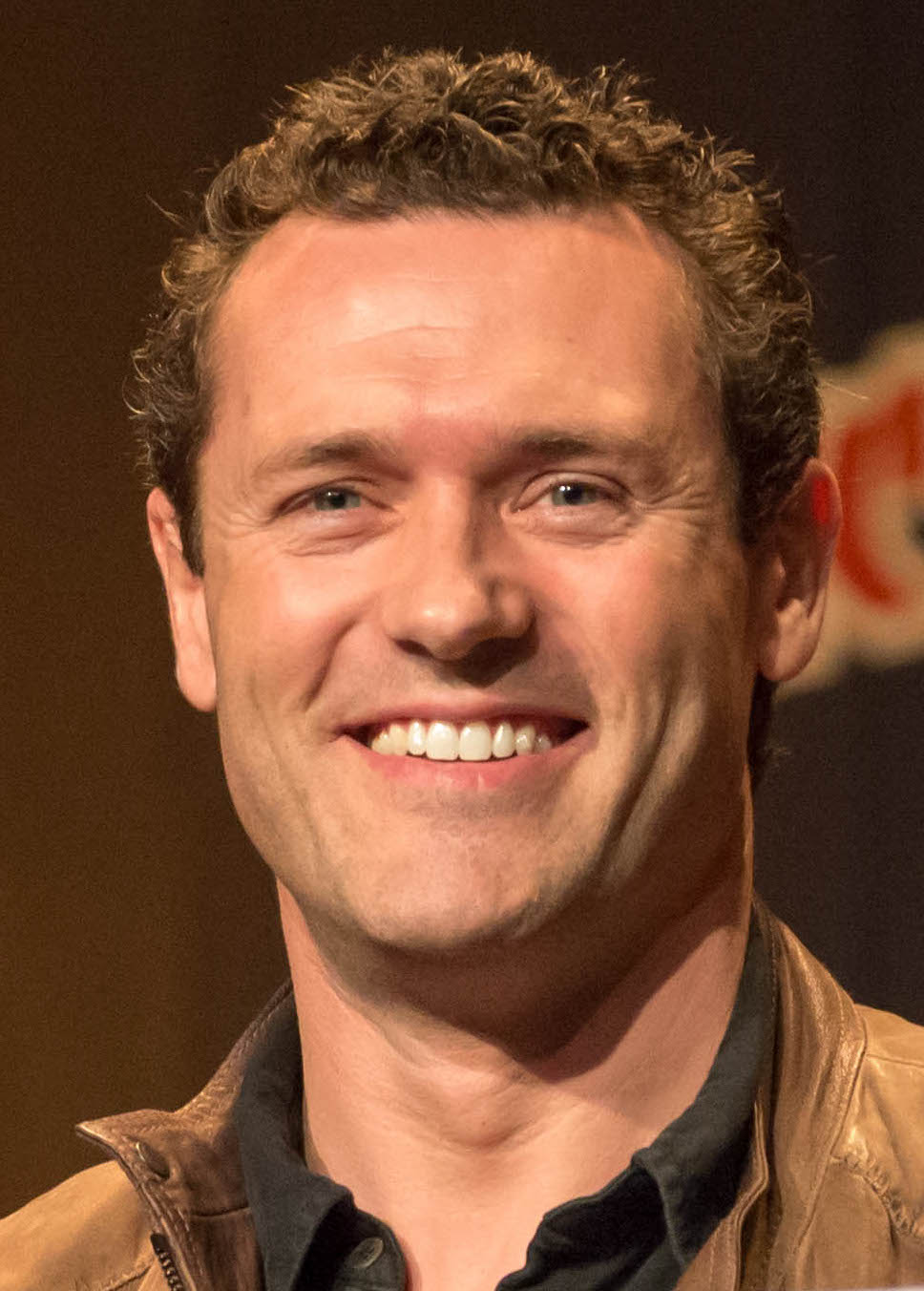
Jason O'Mara won for The Siege of Jadotville (2016).

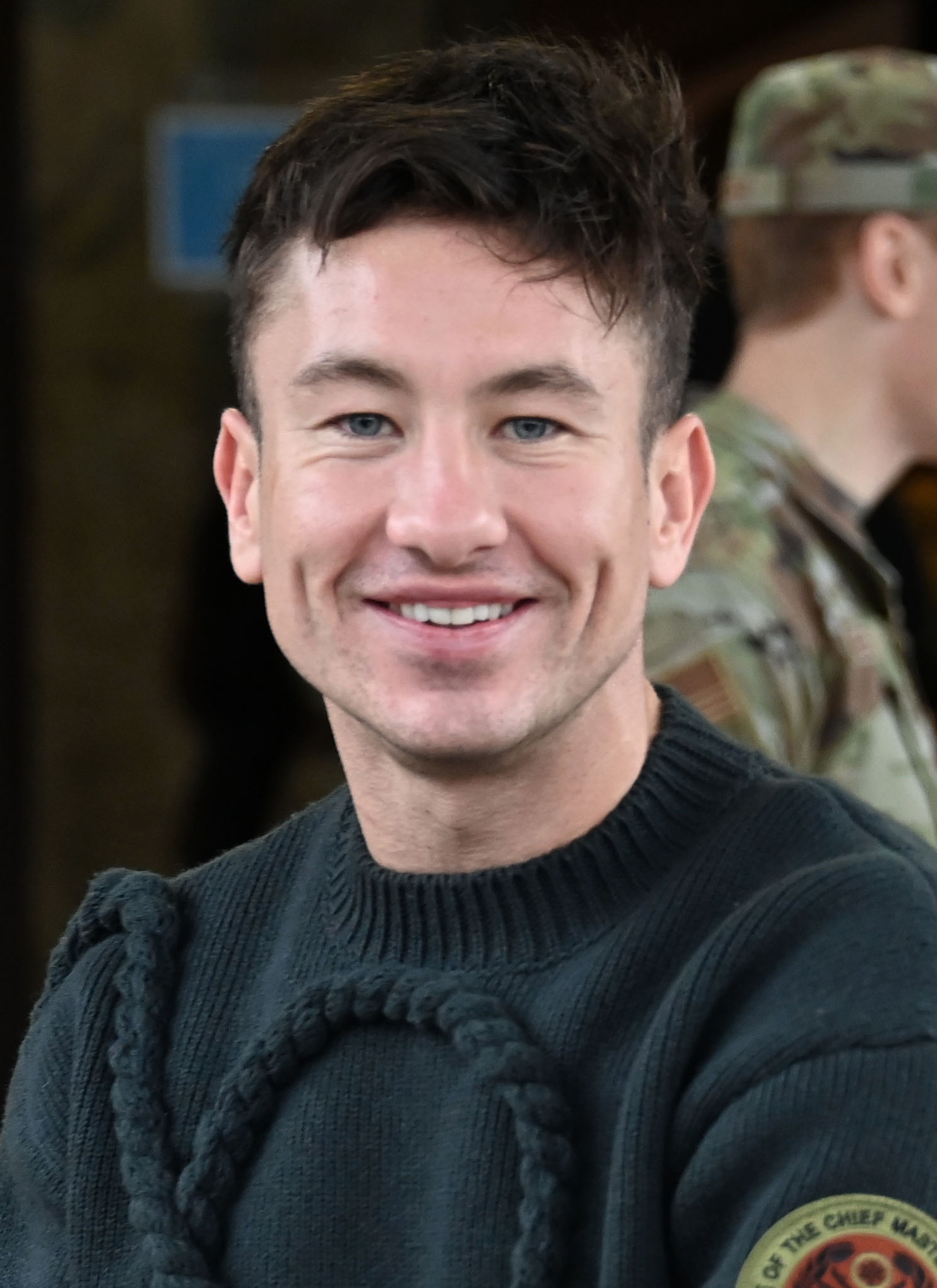
Barry Keoghan won for The Killing of a Sacred Deer (2017).

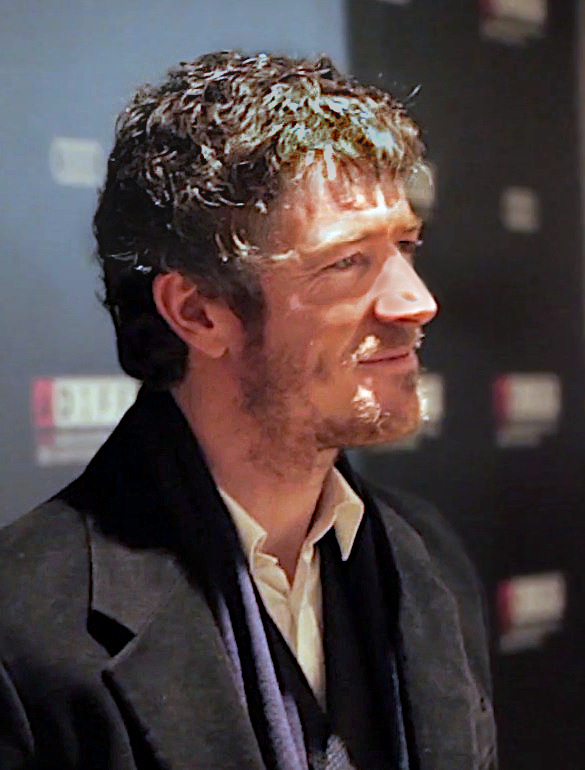
Barry Ward won for Dating Amber (2020).

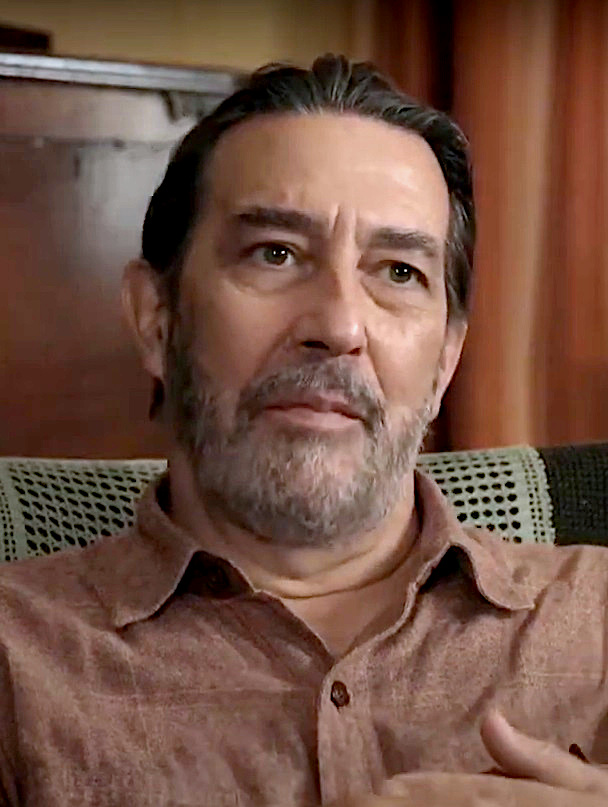
Ciarán Hinds won for Belfast (2021).

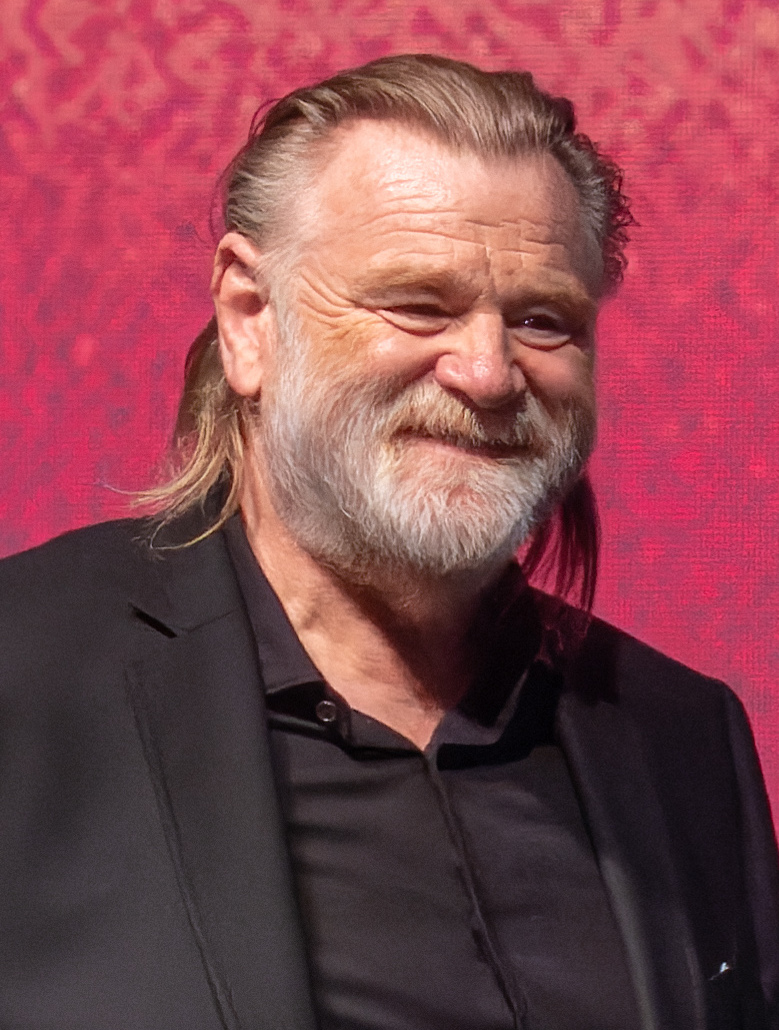
Brendan Gleeson won for The Banshees of Inisherin (2022).

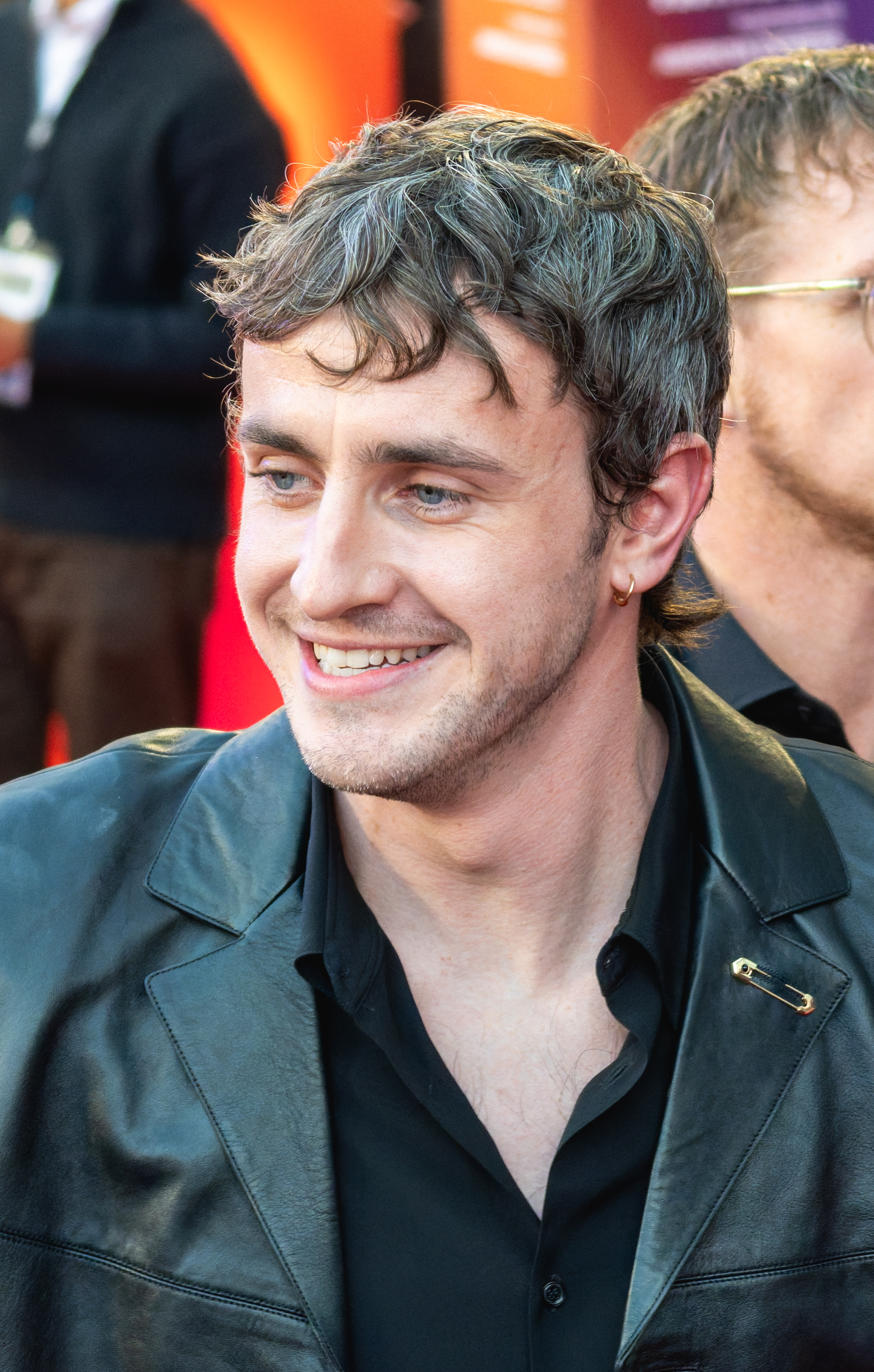
Paul Mescal won twice, for All of Us Strangers (2023). and Hamnet (2025).

== Winners and nominees ==
In the following table, the years are listed as the year of film. The first three ceremonies were held at the end of the year, but since the 4th Irish Film & Television Awards the ceremonies have generally been held the following year. As there was no ceremony in 2019, the 16th Irish Film & Television Awards covered a period of two years.

Table key
‡	Indicates the winner

=== 2000s ===
Year	Actor	Film	Ref.
2003 (Note: For the first two ceremonies, supporting performances for film and television were combined into one category. Only nominees from films are included in this list.) (1st)	David Wilmot ‡	Intermission	
2003 (1st)	Colin Farrell	Intermission	
2003 (1st)	Ciarán Hinds	Veronica Guerin	
2003 (1st)	Gerard McSorley	Veronica Guerin	
2004 (2nd)	Peter O'Toole ‡	Troy	
2004 (2nd)	Ciarán Nolan	Man About Dog	
2005 (3rd)	David Kelly ‡	Charlie and the Chocolate Factory	
2005 (3rd)	Seán McGinley	On a Clear Day	
2005 (3rd)	Cillian Murphy	Batman Begins	
2005 (3rd)	Tadgh Murphy	Boy Eats Girl	
2006 (4th)	Liam Cunningham ‡	The Wind That Shakes the Barley	
2006 (4th)	Pádraic Delaney	The Wind That Shakes the Barley	
2006 (4th)	Gerard McSorley	Middletown	
2006 (4th)	Stephen Rea	Breakfast on Pluto	
2007 (5th)	Brendan Conroy ‡	Kings	
2007 (5th)	Donal O'Kelly	Kings	
2007 (5th)	Conor J. Ryan	Garage	
2007 (5th)	Don Wycherley	Speed Dating	
2008 (6th)	Liam Cunningham ‡	Hunger	
2008 (6th)	Stuart Graham	Hunger	
2008 (6th)	Gerard McSorley	Anton	
2008 (6th)	Peter O'Toole	Dean Spanley	
2009 (7th)	Aidan Quinn ‡	The Eclipse	
2009 (7th)	Simon Delaney	Happy Ever Afters	
2009 (7th)	Michael Fassbender	Fish Tank	
2009 (7th)	Michael Gambon	Harry Potter and the Half-Blood Prince	

=== 2010s ===
Year	Actor	Film	Ref.
2010 (8th)	Pierce Brosnan ‡	The Ghost Writer	
2010 (8th)	Colin Farrell	The Way Back	
2010 (8th)	Brendan Gleeson	Perrier's Bounty	
2010 (8th)	Cillian Murphy	Inception	
2011 (9th)	Chris O'Dowd ‡	Bridesmaids	
2011 (9th)	Liam Cunningham	The Guard	
2011 (9th)	Brendan Gleeson	Albert Nobbs	
2011 (9th)	Ciarán Hinds	The Debt	
2012 (10th)	Domhnall Gleeson ‡	Anna Karenina	
2012 (10th)	Ciarán Hinds	The Woman in Black	
2012 (10th)	Michael McElhatton	Death of a Superhero	
2012 (10th)	David Wilmot	Shadow Dancer	
2013 (11th)	Michael Fassbender ‡	12 Years a Slave	
2013 (11th)	Colin Farrell	Saving Mr. Banks	
2013 (11th)	Edward MacLiam	Run & Jump	
2013 (11th)	Peter McDonald	The Stag	
2014 (12th)	Domhnall Gleeson ‡	Frank	
2014 (12th)	Allen Leech	The Imitation Game	
2014 (12th)	James Nesbitt	Gold	
2014 (12th)	Andrew Scott	Pride	
2015 (13th)	Jack Reynor ‡	Sing Street	
2015 (13th)	Seán T. Ó Meallaigh	The Callback Queen	
2015 (13th)	Domhnall Gleeson	Brooklyn	
2015 (13th)	Owen Roe	Pursuit	
2015 (13th)	Michael Smiley	My Name Is Emily	
2016 (14th)	Jason O'Mara ‡	The Siege of Jadotville	
2016 (14th)	Colin Farrell	Fantastic Beasts and Where to Find Them	
2016 (14th)	Brendan Gleeson	Trespass Against Us	
2016 (14th)	Ciarán Hinds	Bleed for This	
2016 (14th)	Chris Walley	The Young Offenders	
2017 (15th)	Barry Keoghan ‡	The Killing of a Sacred Deer	
2017 (15th)	Jacob McCarthy	The Drummer & the Keeper	
2017 (15th)	Andrew Scott	Handsome Devil	
2017 (15th)	Fionn Walton	Cardboard Gangsters	
2017 (15th)	Barry Ward	Maze	
2018/19 (16th)	David Wilmot ‡	Ordinary Love	
2018/19 (16th)	Ian Lloyd Anderson	Dublin Oldschool	
2018/19 (16th)	Lorcan Cranitch	The Dig	
2018/19 (16th)	Dara Devaney	Arracht	
2018/19 (16th)	Barry Keoghan	Calm with Horses	
2018/19 (16th)	Stephen Rea	Black '47	

=== 2020s ===
Year	Actor	Film	Ref.
2020/21 (17th)	Barry Ward ‡	Dating Amber	
2020/21 (17th)	Brian Gleeson	Death of a Ladies' Man	
2020/21 (17th)	Colm Meaney	Pixie	
2020/21 (17th)	Conleth Hill	Herself	
2020/21 (17th)	Ned Dennehy	Undergods	
2021/22 (18th)	Ciarán Hinds ‡	Belfast	
2021/22 (18th)	Jamie Dornan	Belfast	
2021/22 (18th)	Cillian Ó Gairbhí	Foscadh	
2021/22 (18th)	Dean Quinn	Who We Love	
2021/22 (18th)	Tom Vaughan-Lawlor	The Bright Side	
2022/23 (19th)	Brendan Gleeson ‡	The Banshees of Inisherin	
2022/23 (19th)	Pierce Brosnan	Black Adam	
2022/23 (19th)	Colin Farrell	The Batman	
2022/23 (19th)	Barry Keoghan	The Banshees of Inisherin	
2022/23 (19th)	Paul Mescal	God's Creatures	
2022/23 (19th)	Andrew Scott	Catherine Called Birdy	
2023 (20th)	Paul Mescal ‡	All of Us Strangers	
2023 (20th)	Kenneth Branagh	Oppenheimer	
2023 (20th)	Liam Carney	Sunlight	
2023 (20th)	Diarmuid Noyes	Double Blind	
2023 (20th)	Lalor Roddy	That They May Face The Rising Sun	
2023 (20th)	Chris Walley	Lies We Tell	
2024 (21st)	Brían F. O'Byrne ‡	Conclave	
2024 (21st)	Peter Coonan	Kathleen Is Here	
2024 (21st)	Michael Fassbender	Kneecap	
2024 (21st)	Barry Keoghan	Bird	
2024 (21st)	Tom Vaughan-Lawlor	Baltimore	
2024 (21st)	Steve Wall	Oddity	
2025 (22nd)	Paul Mescal ‡	Hamnet	
2025 (22nd)	Jamie Forde	Christy	
2025 (22nd)	Liam Cunningham	Palestine 36	
2025 (22nd)	Diarmuid Noyes	Christy	
2025 (22nd)	Seán T. Ó Meallaigh	Aontas	
2025 (22nd)	Andrew Scott	Blue Moon	

== Multiple awards and nominations ==
The following individuals have received two or more Supporting Actor awards:

Wins	Actor	Nominations
2	Liam Cunningham	4
2	Domhnall Gleeson	3
2	Paul Mescal	3
2	David Wilmot	3

The following individuals have received two or more Supporting Actor nominations:

Nominations	Actor
5	Colin Farrell
5	Ciarán Hinds
4	Liam Cunningham
4	Brendan Gleeson
4	Barry Keoghan
4	Andrew Scott
3	Michael Fassbender
3	Domhnall Gleeson
3	Paul Mescal
3	Gerard McSorley
3	David Wilmot
2	Pierce Brosnan
2	Cillian Murphy
2	Diarmuid Noyes
2	Seán T. Ó Meallaigh
2	Peter O'Toole
2	Stephen Rea
2	Tom Vaughan-Lawlor
2	Chris Walley
2	Barry Ward
