= List of awards and nominations received by Barry Keoghan =

Accolades received by Irish actor

Barry Keoghan awards and nominations
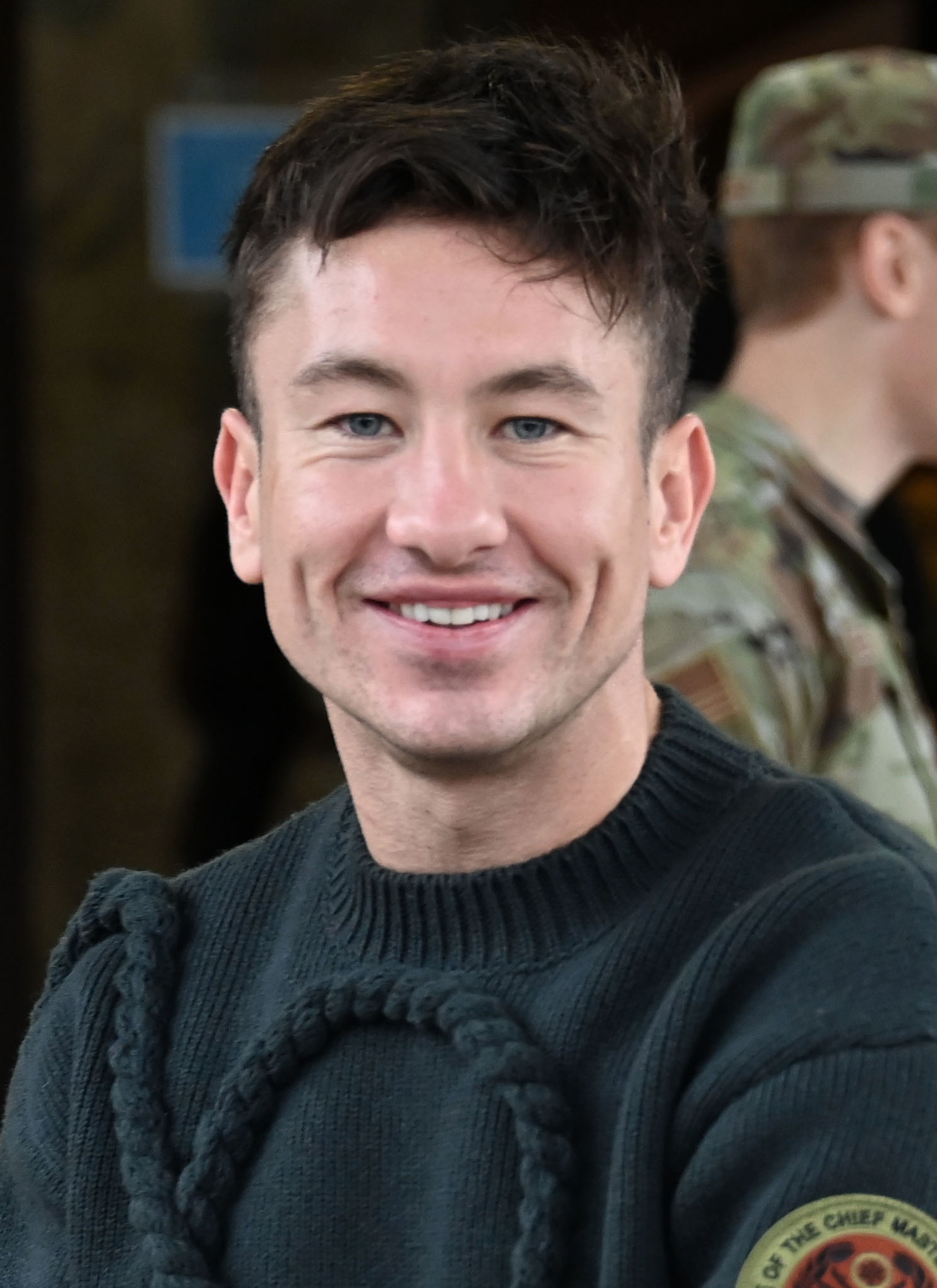
- Keoghan in 2024
Awards and nominations
Award	Wins	Nominations
Academy Awards	0	1
Actor Awards	0	2
BAFTA Awards	1	4
Critics' Choice Awards	0	2
Golden Globe Awards	0	2

Totals (Note: Certain award groups do not simply award one winner. They acknowledge several different recipients, have runners-up, and have third place. Since this is a specific recognition and is different from losing an award, runner-up mentions are considered wins in this award tally. For simplification and to avoid errors, each award in this list has been presumed to have had a prior nomination.)
- Wins: 6
- Nominations: 73

The following is a list of awards and nominations received by Irish actor Barry Keoghan. He received a slew of nominations for Yorgos Lanthimos's The Killing of a Sacred Deer, but his big awards break came with Martin McDonagh's The Banshees of Inisherin, for which he won a BAFTA Award, and received an Academy Award nomination.

== Major associations ==
=== Academy Awards ===
Year	Category	Nominated work	Result	Ref.
2023	Best Supporting Actor	The Banshees of Inisherin	Nominated	

=== Actor Awards ===
Year	Category	Nominated work	Result	Ref.
2023	Outstanding Male Actor in a Supporting Role	The Banshees of Inisherin	Nominated	
2023	Outstanding Cast in a Motion Picture	The Banshees of Inisherin	Nominated (Note: Shared with the cast)	

=== BAFTA Awards ===
Year	Category	Nominated work	Result	Ref.
British Academy Film Awards
2019	Rising Star Award	—N/a	Nominated	
2021	Best Actor in a Supporting Role	Calm With Horses	Nominated	
2023	Best Actor in a Supporting Role	The Banshees of Inisherin	Won	
2024	Best Actor in a Leading Role	Saltburn	Nominated	

=== Critics' Choice Awards ===
Year	Category	Nominated work	Result	Ref.
Film
2023	Best Supporting Actor	The Banshees of Inisherin	Nominated	
2023	Best Acting Ensemble	The Banshees of Inisherin	Nominated	

=== Golden Globe Awards ===
Year	Category	Nominated work	Result	Ref.
2023	Best Supporting Actor – Motion Picture	The Banshees of Inisherin	Nominated	
2024	Best Actor – Motion Picture Drama	Saltburn	Nominated	

== Other awards ==
=== British Independent Film Awards ===
Year	Category	Nominated work	Result	Ref.
2018	Best Supporting Actor	American Animals	Nominated	
2021	Best Supporting Actor	Calm With Horses	Nominated	
2024	Best Supporting Performance	Bird	Nominated	

=== Independent Spirit Awards ===
Year	Category	Nominated work	Result	Ref.
2018	Best Supporting Male	The Killing of a Sacred Deer	Nominated	

=== Irish Film & Television Awards ===
Year	Category	Nominated work	Result	Ref.
2016	Actor in a Lead Role - Film	Mammal	Nominated	
2017	Rising Star Award	—N/a	Nominated	
2018	Best Supporting Actor – Film	The Killing of a Sacred Deer	Won	
2020	Best Supporting Actor - Drama	Chernobyl	Nominated	
2020	Best Supporting Actor - Film	Calm With Horses	Nominated	
2023	Best Supporting Actor - Film	The Banshees of Inisherin	Nominated	
2024	Actor in a Lead Role - Film	Saltburn	Nominated	
2025	Best Supporting Actor - Film	Bird	Nominated	

== Other associations ==
Year	Award	Category	Work	Result	Ref.
2017	Dublin Film Critics' Circle	Best Actor	The Killing of a Sacred Deer	Runner-up	
2017	Dublin Film Critics' Circle	Breakthrough Artist	The Killing of a Sacred Deer	Won	
2017	Florida Film Critics Circle	Best Supporting Actor	The Killing of a Sacred Deer	Nominated	
2017	Florida Film Critics Circle	Pauline Kael Breakout Award	—N/a	Nominated	
2017	San Diego Film Critics Society	Breakthrough Artist	—N/a	Nominated	
2017	Seattle Film Critics Society	Best Supporting Actor	The Killing of a Sacred Deer	Nominated	
2017	Seattle Film Critics Society	Villain of the Year	The Killing of a Sacred Deer	Nominated	
2017	Village Voice Film Poll	Best Supporting Performance	The Killing of a Sacred Deer	Nominated	
2018	Chlotrudis Society for Independent Films	Best Supporting Actor	The Killing of a Sacred Deer	Nominated	
2018	Columbus Film Critics Association	Best Supporting Actor	The Killing of a Sacred Deer	Nominated	
2018	Evening Standard British Film Awards	Best Supporting Actor	The Killing of a Sacred Deer	Nominated	
2018	International Cinephile Society	Best Supporting Actor	The Killing of a Sacred Deer	Nominated	
2019	National Film Awards UK	Best Supporting Actor	American Animals	Nominated	
2021	North Texas Film Critics Association	Best Supporting Actor	The Green Knight	Nominated	
2022	Chicago Film Critics Association	Best Supporting Actor	The Banshees of Inisherin	Nominated	
2022	Greater Western New York Film Critics Association Awards	Best Supporting Actor	The Banshees of Inisherin	Nominated	
2022	North Texas Film Critics Association	Best Supporting Actor	The Banshees of Inisherin	Nominated	
2022	Online Association of Female Film Critics	Best Supporting Male	The Banshees of Inisherin	Nominated	
2022	Washington D.C. Area Film Critics Association	Best Supporting Actor	The Banshees of Inisherin	Nominated	
2023	Alliance of Women Film Journalists	Best Supporting Actor	The Banshees of Inisherin	Nominated	
2023	Austin Film Critics Association	Best Supporting Actor	The Banshees of Inisherin	Nominated	
2023	Columbus Film Critics Association	Best Supporting Actor	The Banshees of Inisherin	Nominated	
2023	Denver Film Critics Society	Best Supporting Actor	The Banshees of Inisherin	Nominated	
2023	Georgia Film Critics Association	Best Supporting Actor	The Banshees of Inisherin	Nominated	
2023	Hawaii Film Critics Society	Best Supporting Actor	The Banshees of Inisherin	Nominated	
2023	Hollywood Critics Association	Best Supporting Actor	The Banshees of Inisherin	Nominated	
2023	Houston Film Critics Society	Best Supporting Actor	The Banshees of Inisherin	Nominated	
2023	International Cinephile Society	Best Supporting Actor	The Banshees of Inisherin	Nominated	
2023	London Film Critics' Circle	Supporting Actor of the Year	The Banshees of Inisherin	Won	
2023	National Society of Film Critics	Best Supporting Actor	The Banshees of Inisherin	Nominated	
2023	North Carolina Film Critics Association	Best Supporting Actor	The Banshees of Inisherin	Nominated	
2023	North Dakota Film Society	Best Supporting Actor	The Banshees of Inisherin	Nominated	
2023	Online Film Critics Society	Best Supporting Actor	The Banshees of Inisherin	Nominated	
2023	Phoenix Critics Circle	Best Actor	Saltburn	Nominated	
2023	San Diego Film Critics Society	Best Supporting Actor	The Banshees of Inisherin	Nominated	
2023	Seattle Film Critics Society	Best Supporting Actor	The Banshees of Inisherin	Nominated	
2023	Toronto Film Critics Association	Best Supporting Actor	The Banshees of Inisherin	Nominated	
2023	UK Film Critics Association	Best Actor	Saltburn	Nominated	
2023	Vancouver Film Critics Circle	Best Supporting Actor	The Banshees of Inisherin	Nominated	
2024	Hasty Pudding Theatricals	Man of the Year	—N/a	Won	
2024	Hollywood Critics Association	Best Actor	Saltburn	Nominated	
2024	Satellite Awards	Best Actor - Motion Picture Comedy or Musical	Saltburn	Nominated	
