= Liam Carney =

Irish actor

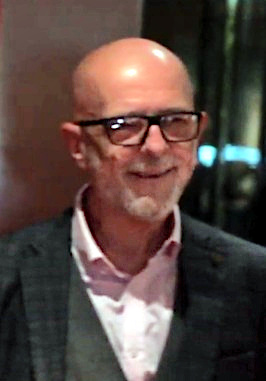
Liam Carney at 2020 Dublin International Film Festival

Liam Carney is an Irish actor; Born in 1960, his credits include The Commitments (1991), Glenroe (1992–1995), Braveheart (1995), Angela's Ashes (1995), Ballykissangel (1998), Gangs of New York (2002), The Clinic (2002, 2009), Pure Mule (2005), Titanic: Blood and Steel (2012), Ripper Street (2013), Crossing Lines (2014), Outlander (2014–2015), Red Rock (2015), Sacrifice (2016), Lost & Found (2016), Calm with Horses (2019), Barber (2023), Fair City (2022–2023), The Gone (2023), and Harry Wild (2022–2024).

== Biography ==
Carney was born in Dublin in 1960, to parents who had moved from County Mayo with 6 other children.

He had two children with his first wife; however, the relationship ended in late 1986. He began dating Karmel Daly; after twelve years together, they married in late 2001. The couple has a daughter and three sons.

He became despondent working as a civil servant in the post office, and decided to take up acting.

== Career ==
Carney began his acting career with the Laughing Gravy Theatre Company. He rose to fame playing Kevin Haughey for several years on the soap opera Glenroe. In 1995, he landed a supporting role as playing Sean in the hit film Braveheart, alongside Mel Gibson. In 1999, he played Uncle Pa Keating in the film Angela's Ashes.

In 2002, he played one of the members of Bill "The Butcher" Cutting's (Daniel Day-Lewis) gang in the film Gangs of New York. In 2003, he played Mr. Callan, in two episodes, then in 2009, he played Franny McGowan for five episodes of the series The Clinic.

In 2012, he played Sean Malone in the series Titanic: Blood and Steel. In 2014, he guest-starred playing Michael McConnell on the series Crossing Lines. That same year he joined the recurring cast of the series Outlander, where he plays Alec "Old Alec" McMahon MacKenzie.

In 2015, he joined the main cast of the series Red Rock, where he plays Tommy Tyrell.

In 2019, he starred alongside Cosmo Jarvis, Barry Keoghan, Niamh Algar, & Ned Dennehy in the film Calm with Horses.

== Filmography ==
=== Films ===
Year	Title	Character	Notes
1991	The Commitments	Duffy	alongside Andrew Strong, Colm Meaney, Andrea Corr, Glen Hansard, Robert Arkins & Maria Doyle Kennedy
1994	Joey's Christmas	-	short - alongside Stephen Dunne, Stuart Foran, Michelle McDonagh, Pauline McLynn & Frank Smith
1995	Sharpe's Battle	O'Rourke	alongside Sean Bean, Daragh O'Malley, Hugh Fraser, Hugh Ross, Jason Durr, Ian McNeice & Oliver Cotton
1995	Braveheart	Sean	alongside Mel Gibson, Sophie Marceau, Ian Bannen, Brendan Gleeson, Patrick McGoohan, James Cosmo & Tommy Flanagan
1997	The Boxer	Mr.Walsh	alongside Daniel Day-Lewis, Emily Watson, Brian Cox, Ken Stott, Gerard McSorley & Ian McElhinney
1998	Soft Sand, Blue Sea	Pool Hustler	alongside Laurence Kinlan, Kevin McCauley, Julia Ford, Brendan Coyle, Rosemary Henderson & Deirdre Molloy
1999	Angela's Ashes	Pa Keating	alongside Emily Watson, Robert Carlyle, Devon Murray, Joe Breen, Michael Legge, Ciaran Owens & Ronnie Masterson
2000	When the Sky Falls	Dessie O'Reilly	alongside Joan Allen, Patrick Bergin, Liam Cunningham, Kevin McNally & Jason Barry
2001	J.J. Biker	-	alongside Brendan Gleeson, Maria Doyle Kennedy, Eoghan O'Riada & Daithi O'Suilleabhain
2001	On the Edge	Friend of Heavy	alongside Paul Hickey, Camille O'Sullivan, Cillian Murphy, Vincent Walsh, Stephen Rea & Aidan Kelly
2001	Tupperware	Lone Ranger	alongside Dawn Bradfield, David Herlihy, Peadar Lamb & Maire Ni Ghrainne
2002	Gangs of New York	Gangbanger	alongside Leonardo DiCaprio, Daniel Day-Lewis, Jim Broadbent, John C. Reilly, Liam Neeson, Brendan Gleeson & Gary Lewis
2003	Martin	-	short - alongside Pauline Cadell, Martin L. Evans, Niall O'Shea & Terence Orr
2004	Spin the Bottle	Gerry	alongside Michael McElhatton, Simon Delaney, Mick Fitzgerald, Bronagh Gallagher & Maria Doyle Kennedy
2005	Conflict	David	short - alongside Joey Lauren Adams, Laurel Holloman, Harvey Silver, Jason Mewes, Stan Lee & Renée Humphrey
2006	Studs	Isaiah	alongside Brendan Gleeson, Domhnall Gleeson, Eoin Macken, Emmett Scanlan & David Wilmot
2007	Speed Dating	Jupiter	alongside Hugh O'Conor, Emma Choy, Alex Reid, David Hayman, Kelly Campbell & Paul Ronan
2011	Jack Taylor: The Magdalen...	Bill Cassell	alongside Nathan Reynolds, Ger Carey, Killian Scott, Iain Glen, Frank O'Sullivan, Nora-Jane Noone & Nick Lee
2013	Cold	James	alongside Tom Hopper, Jack Reynor, Eoin Macken, Rebecca Night & Melia Kreiling
2014	Spiders Trap	Spike	alongside Brian Fortune, Simon Delaney, Morgan C. Jones, Sarah Carroll & Jane Elizabeth Walsh
2016	Sacrifice	Mr, Grey	
2016	Lost & Found	Eddie	
2018	Cecelia Ahern: Dich zu lieben	Taxifahrer	TV movie
2018	Point of No Return	Taxi driver	
2019	Calm with Horses	Fannigan	alongside Cosmo Jarvis, Barry Keoghan, Niamh Algar, & Ned Dennehy
2023	Sunlight	Iver	
2023	Barber	Tony Quinn	alongside Aidan Gillen John Connors
2025	Crazy Love	Father	alongside John Connors

=== TV Series ===
Year	Title	Character	Notes
1995	The Hanging Gale	Shanahan	episode 1.1
1998	Ballykissangel	Johnner Delaney	3 episodes
1999	The Ambassador	Healy	episode "The Velvet Glove"
1995 - 2000	Glenroe	Kevin Haughey	-
2005	Pure Mule	Cliff Jones	5 episodes
2007	Single-Handed	Tommy Gallagher	3' episodes
2009	Pure Mule: The Last Weekend	Cliff	2 episodes
2009	The Clinic	Franny McGowan	7 episodes
2012	Titanic: Blood and Steel	Sean Malone	4 episodes
2013	Ripper Street	Lynch	episode "The Weight of a Man's Heart"
2013	Criminal Life	Stephen Forrester	episode 1.2 - "miniseries"
2014	Crossing Lines	Michael McConnell	episode "The Velvet Glove"
2014 - 2015	Outlander	Alec McMahon MacKenzie	3 episodes
2015–present	Red Rock	Tommy Tyrell	60 episodes
2019	The Virtues	Damon	2 episodes
2022	Tales from Dún Draíochta	Garda Billy	9 episodes
2023	SisterS	Mickey	3 episodes
2022-2023	Fair City	Con Rafferty	23 episodes
2023	The Gone	Joseph Martin	6 episodes
2022-2024	Harry Wild	Happy the Shark	4 episodes
