= Nykiya Adams =

British child actress

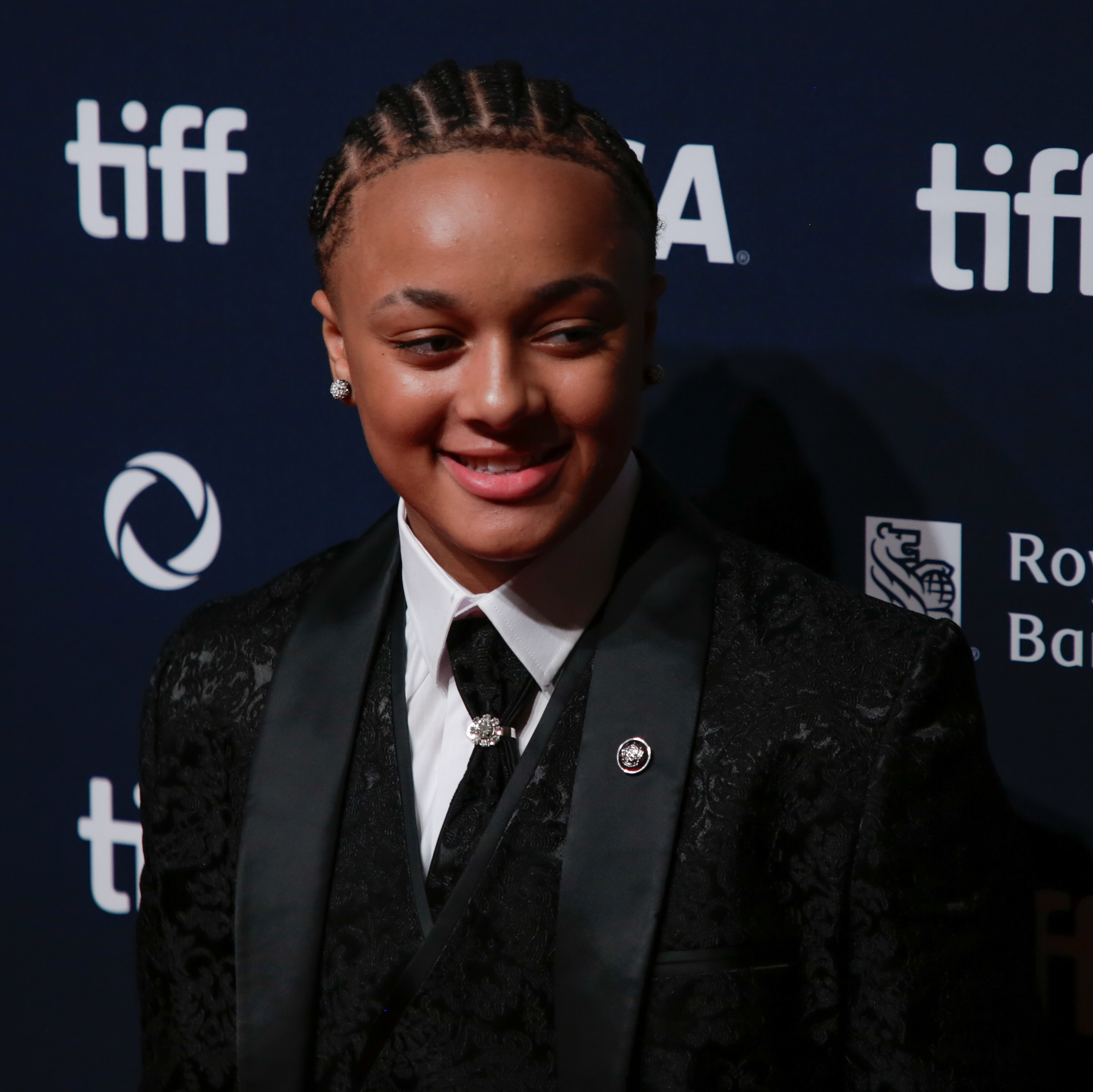
- Adams at the 2024 Toronto International Film Festival
- Born: 2009/2010
- Years active: 2022–present

Nykiya Adams (born 2009/2010) is a British child actress. She made her film debut playing Bailey in Andrea Arnold's coming-of-age drama Bird (2024).

== Early and personal life ==
She is from Basildon, Essex. She has an older sister called Tallulah Adams.

== Career ==
She made her screen debut as Bailey in Andrea Arnold's 2024 film Bird alongside Barry Keoghan. Previously, she had only acted in a school production of Matilda. Arnold reworked her script to accommodate Adams once she was cast as Bailey. She was cast following a meeting with the film's casting director Lucy Pardee at an open casting at her school. She received praise from critics for her performance, described as "one of the year's best", with a "screen presence" and "an authentic realism", as well as "stunning".

For her performance in Bird, she was nominated in the Young British or Irish Performer at the London Film Critics Circle Awards. She was nominated for the 2024 British Independent Film Award for Breakthrough Performance. She was nominated for Best Women's Breakthrough Performance at the Alliance of Women Film Journalists Awards.

She also featured in the Fontaines D.C. music video for the song Bug in 2024.

== Filmography ==
Year	Title	Role	Notes
2024	Bird	Bailey	
