= Olga Wehrly =

Irish actor and voiceover artist

- Born: Olga Wehrly
- Occupation: Actor
- Years active: 2005–present

Olga Wehrly (born 1978 or 1979) is an Irish actor and voiceover artist.

== Background ==
Wehrly is from Ransboro, County Sligo. She joined the Mary McDonagh School of Dance at the age of three and later studied drama under Damien Quinn. Wehrly attended University College Dublin where she studied arts but did not complete her degree.

== Career ==
In 2005, Wehrly featured in a television ad for Kerrygold butter directed by Lenny Abrahamson. Later that year she made her television series debut guest starring in Raidió Teilifís Éireann drama The Clinic. Her theatre credits include Othello (2007) and Macbeth (2008) with the Second Age Theatre Company and Penelope with the Druid Theatre Company.

== Personal life ==
Wehrly has a daughter named Úna. Wehrly contracted COVID-19 in December 2020 and developed long COVID.

== Filmography ==
Year	Title	Role
TBC	The Ulysses Project	Molly Bloom/Gerty MacDowell
2022	Róise & Frank	Lisa
2021	The Passion	Gráinne
2020	Wildfire	Mother
2020	Professionals	Aviva
2020	The Head	Dr. Sarah Jackson
2020	Normal People	Sarah
2019	Krypton	Med-tech
2019	Vivarium	Crying woman
2018	Nightflyers	Murphy's wife
2018	Ruby	
2017	Lost & Found	Zoe
2017	Kodaline: Brother	Mum
2017	Song of Granite	Mary Heaney
2017	Vikings	Saxon woman
2017	Striking Out	Eve Hayes
2016	Fir Bolg	Eileen O'Rourke
2016	Without Name	Margaret
2016	Penny Dreadful	Suffragette leader
2016	Éirí Amach Amú	Dee Purcell
2013-2015	The Mario Rosenstock Show	Multiple roles
2013	1916 Seachtar Dearmadta	Maud Gonne
2013	Dark Touch	Collette
2012	Dublin in Pieces	Anna
2011	The Evening Was Long	Viki
2011	Death of a Superhero	Nursey Worsey
2010	The Alarms: A Story in Words	Kate
2010	The Crush	Miss Purdy
2009	Rásaí na Gaillimhe	Sinéad Connell
2009	Blood Coloured Moon	Jenny Brennan
2009	Legend of the Bog	Mallory Ross
2009	This is Nightlive	Úna Óg Nic Ní Suailecaint
2008	Team Sleep/Foireann Codladh	Council Official
2008	Raw	Katherine
2008	Ape	Various
2005-2007	The Clinic	Molly Miller
2007	Nuts	Wife
2007	Speed Dating	Victoria Grant
