= Rory Keenan =

Irish actor

- Born: Dublin, Ireland
- Education: Trinity College Dublin
- Occupation: Actor
- Years active: 1999–present
- Spouse: Gemma Arterton (m. 2019)
- Children: 2

Rory Keenan is an Irish actor. On film and television he has starred in Somewhere Boy, The Duchess, Birdsong, Versailles, War & Peace, The Guard, and Peaky Blinders.

== Career ==
Keenan has performed in many National Theatre productions, as well as at BAM, New York, and Wyndhams Theatre in the West End as Jamie in Long Day's Journey into Night, directed by Sir Richard Eyre. He starred at the Donmar Warehouse in Saint Joan and Welcome Home Captain Fox!

Previous work at the National Theatre includes The Kitchen, Damned By Despair and Liola, and Philadelphia, Here I Come! and Dublin Carol at the Donmar Warehouse.

He has performed many leading roles in Ireland, having worked from an early age at Abbey Theatre, as well as the title roles in Hamlet and Macbeth, the latter of which landed him Best Actor at the 11th Irish Times Irish Theatre Awards.

In 2010, Keenan appeared in the short film The Crush, which was nominated at the Academy Awards for Best Live Action Short Film.

On television he was seen in Channel 4's Somewhere Boy, Netflix's The Duchess, BBC's Versailles, War & Peace and Peaky Blinders.

In 2022, Keenan wrote and directed his debut film Bump, which starred his wife Gemma Arterton, and was screened at the Cinequest Film & Creativity Festival in San Jose, California, and Cleveland International Film Festival. He was awarded Best Director at the British Short Film Awards 2022.

== Personal life ==
In 2019, he married actress Gemma Arterton. The couple's first child, a son, was born in December 2022.

== Filmography ==
=== Television ===
Year	Title	Role	Notes
1999	Aristocrats	George	TV mini series
2001–02	On Home Ground	Kevin King	16 episodes
2003	The Clinic	Michael	6 episodes
2005	Showbands	Keith	TV mini series
2011	Primeval	Michael	1 episode
2012	Birdsong	Brennan	TV mini series
2014	Peaky Blinders	Donal Henry	3 episodes
2016	Stan Lee's Lucky Man	Simon	2 episodes
2016	War & Peace	Bilibin	4 episodes
2017	Versailles	Leopold	8 episodes
2017	Come Home	Tomlinson	2 episodes
2017–18	Striking Out	Eric	10 episodes
2020	The Duchess	Shep	6 episodes
2021	Rules Of The Game	Hugh	3 episodes
2022	Somewhere Boy	Steve	8 episodes
2024	Blackshore	Garda Cian Furlong	6 episodes
TBC	The Secret Diary of Adrian Mole Aged 13¾	Mr. Lucas	TV mini series

=== Film ===
Year	Title	Role	Notes
2002	Reign of Fire	Devon	
2003	Intermission	Anthony Lowry	
2003	Benedict Arnold: A Question of Honor	Malitiaman	TV movie
2004	Ella Enchanted	Otto	
2005	Showbands	Keith	TV movie
2005	Still Life	Man	Short film
2006	Pride and Joy	Rory Lawlor	
2009	One Hundred Mornings	Mark	
2009	Zonad	Guy Hendrickson	
2010	Windows	Terry	Short film
2010	The Crush	Boyfriend	nominated Academy Award Best Live Action Short Film
2011	National Theatre Live: The Kitchen	Kevin	
2011	The Guard	McBride	
2012	Earthbound	Gordon	
2012	Keys to the City	Paul	
2016	The Young Messiah	Lucifer	
2016	Grimsby	James Thurbeck	
2026	Power Ballad	Binzer	

=== Theatre ===
Year	Title	Role	Theatre	Notes
2007	Don Carlos	Don Carlos	Rough Magic	
2007	Saved	Fred	Abbey Theatre	
2009	Macbeth	Macbeth	Siren Productions/The Empty Space	Best Actor In Supporting Role, Irish Times Theatre Awards
2009	The Last Days of the Celtic Tiger	Ronan	Landmark Productions/Olympia Theatre, Dublin	
2010	The Big Fellah	Ruairi	Lyric Hammersmith	
2010	The Importance of Being Earnest	Jack	Rough Magic/Gaiety Theatre, Dublin	
2011	The Kitchen	Kevin	Royal National Theatre	
2011	Lakeboat/Prairie du Chien	Fred	Arcola Theatre	
2012	Damned by Despair	Pedrisco	Royal National Theatre	
2012	Philadelphia Here I Come	Gar Private	Donmar Warehouse	
2012	Dublin Carol	Mark	Donmar Warehouse	
2013	Liola	Liola	Royal National Theatre	
2015	Someone Who'll Watch Over Me	Edward	Chichester Festival Theatre	
2016	Saint Joan	The Inquisitor	Donmar Warehouse	
2016	The Seagull	Trigorin	Dublin Theatre Festival	
2016	Welcome Home Captain Fox	Gene	Donmar Warehouse	
2018	Long Day's Journey Into Night	James Tyrone Jr.	Wyndham's Theatre / BAM, New York	
2019	Plenty	Raymond Brock	Chichester Festival Theatre	
