= The Crush (2010 film) =

2010 short film by Michael Creagh

- Directed by: Michael Creagh
- Written by: Michael Creagh
- Produced by: Damon Quinn
- Starring: Olga Wehrly; Rory Keenan; Charlie Bonner; Neili Conroy; Oran Creagh
- Cinematography: Jim Creagh
- Edited by: Ciara Brophy
- Music by: David Geraghty
- Release date: 22 April 2010 (Tribeca)
- Running time: 15 minutes
- Country: Ireland
- Language: English

The Crush is a 2010 Irish live action short film. The film's runtime is approximately 15 minutes. It was written and directed by first-timer Michael Creagh, and produced by Damon Quinn. The film was shot during Easter 2009 in Skerries, north Dublin. Creagh cast his nine-year-old son Oran in the lead role of the story.

The story sees an eight-year-old schoolboy (Oran Creagh) named Ardal Travis fall in love with his teacher, Miss Purdy (Olga Wehrly). However, heartbreak ensues when he finds Miss Purdy with an engagement ring from her boyfriend (Rory Keenan). Devastated and spurned, Ardal challenges Miss Purdy’s fiancé to a duel to the death.

== Plot ==
Eight-year-old Ardal Travis has a crush on his second grade class teacher, Ms. Purdy, and demonstrates his love by giving her a toy ring. Subsequently, while out shopping with his mother, Ardal sees Ms. Purdy, who happily explains to them that she and her boyfriend Pierce have just become engaged to be married. Pierce appears to be a jerk; he refuses to take Ms. Purdy for lunch to celebrate the hour-old engagement, insisting instead on going home to watch the football. That evening Ardal sees his dad put a gun carefully in the closet, at which he stares contemplating his options.

Some days later, Ardal confronts Pierce while Pierce is impatiently waiting for Ms. Purdy outside of the school. Ardal challenges Pierce to a duel to the death, which Pierce mockingly accepts. The next day, Ardal meets Pierce in the school yard. Pierce forgets his gun on purpose and Ardal pulls a gun on him. Pierce at first believes it to be a toy, but Ardal insists it is not. Ms. Purdy attempts to intervene but Ardal refuses to back down. Pierce, by now genuinely concerned for his own safety, becomes irate and is finally reduced to a crying mess, ultimately confessing that he never loved Ms. Purdy but only proposed to her to “shut her up". Ardal shoots the gun, the scene blacks out momentarily, and then returns with Pierce having fallen to the ground, but with eyes open.

It is revealed that the gun was a toy, after all, one that Ardal’s father was saving in his closet until his birthday. Ms. Purdy angrily calls off the engagement and breaks up with Pierce. She protectively walks Ardal out, agreeing to “keep this between ourselves". Ardal then tells Ms. Purdy that he has decided not to marry her after all because he is "not financially stable enough to cater for all [her] needs" adding that "someone as nice as you should have everything she wants". Charmed - even moved - by his earnest innocence and yet, despite herself, somehow still impressed by his precociousness, she says: "Come on Romeo, I'll get you home". As they walk off into the distance she places an affectionate hand fleetingly on his shoulder.

At the beginning of the movie Ms. Purdy had asked her students to look up the three words 'reveal', 'pretend' and 'love'; concepts which, we now see, may be thought to encapsulate the entire film.

== Cast ==
As listed:

- Olga Wehrly as Ms. Purdy
- Rory Keenan as Boyfriend
- Oran Creagh as Ardal Travis
- Charlie Bonner as Dad
- Neilí Conroy as Mum

== Accolades ==
The film was awarded Best Irish Short at the 23rd Foyle Film Festival. On 25 January 2011, it was nominated for the Academy Award for Best Live Action Short Film at the 83rd Academy Awards.
