= David Wilmot (actor) =

Irish actor

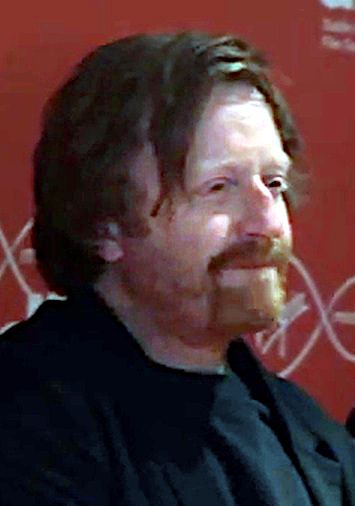
- Wilmot at VDIFF 2020
- Occupation: Actor
- Years active: 1987–present

David Wilmot is an Irish actor. His credits include Michael Collins (1996), I Went Down (1997), The Devil's Own (1997), The Tale of Sweeney Todd (1998), Intermission (2003), The Clinic (2003–2004), King Arthur (2004), Six Shooter (2006), The Tudors (2009-2010), The Guard (2011), Anna Karenina (2012), Treasure Island (2012), Gold (2014), Ripper Street (2012–2016), Black Sails (2017), The Alienist (2018), Resistance (2019), Rebellion (2019), The Letter for the King (2020), Barkskins (2021), Station Eleven (2021–2022), Bodkin (2025), Hamnet (2025), and Hokum (2026).

== Career ==
=== Film and television ===
Wilmot's acting debut was in the television film Lapsed Catholics (1987), He appeared in The Field (1990), and in Michael Collins (1996).

In 2003, Wilmot portrayed Dr. Ed Costello in 16 episodes of the RTÉ series The Clinic, for which, he was nominated for the Irish Film and Television Award for Best Actor in a TV Drama. Other credits were Laws of Attraction (2004), King Arthur (2004), Six Shooter (2006), The Guard (2011) and Gold (2014).

In 2009 and 2010, Wilmot appeared as rebel captain Sir Ralph Ellerker in seasons 3 and 4 of the Showtime series The Tudors. In January 2012, he appeared alongside Eddie Izzard in Sky 1's version of Treasure Island. He also appeared in the docudrama Saving the Titanic as the ship's Chief Engineer Joseph Bell. Wilmot played a supporting role in the BBC One drama Ripper Street, as the cantankerous bearded Police Sergeant Donald Atherton. He similarly played police Captain Connor in 2018's TNT production of The Alienist. He played the character of Israel Hands in season 4 of Starz pirate series Black Sails.

Wilmot starred as a series regular as the corporate consultant Clark in the 2021 HBO Max TV series Station Eleven, an adaptation of the novel of the same name.

In 2025, he played John Shakespeare, starring alongside Jessie Buckley, Paul Mescal, and Emily Watson in the Chloé Zhao directed romantic historical drama film Hamnet.

=== Theatre ===
In 1992, Wilmot began his theatre career in the play At the Black Pig's Dyke for the Druid Theatre Company, Galway. Later theatre credits include Six Characters in Search of an Author at the Abbey Theatre, Dublin (1996), As You Like It with the Druid Theatre Company, Galway (1999), and Juno and the Paycock at the Gaiety Theatre, London.

He originated the role of Padraic in The Lieutenant of Inishmore at The Other Place in Stratford-upon-Avon in 2001, played it at the Barbican Centre in 2002, then joined the 2006 off-Broadway Atlantic Theater Company production, which later transferred to Broadway. For this role, he was nominated at the 60th Tony Awards for the Best Performance by a Leading Actor in a Play, the Drama League Award for Distinguished Performance, and the Outer Critics Circle Award for Outstanding Actor in a Play 2006, and won the Lucille Lortel Award for Outstanding Lead Actor, and the Theatre World Award for his performance.

== Filmography ==
=== Film ===
Year	Title	Role	Notes
1990	The Field	Boy at Dance	
1996	Michael Collins	Squad Youth #2	
1997	The Devil's Own	Dessie	
1997	I Went Down	Anto	
1997	The Last Bus Home	Bus Conductor	
1998	The General	Assassin	
1999	A Love Divided	Ted Nealan	
2000	Rat	Phelim Spratt	
2000	Flick	Des Fitzpatrick	
2003	Intermission	Oscar	IFTA Nom + Win
2004	Laws of Attraction	Brendan	
2004	King Arthur	Woad killed by Lancelot	
2006	Studs	Bubbles	
2006	Middletown	Sammy	
2007	Waiting for Dublin	Heneghan	
2008	Dorothy	Colin Garrivan	
2010	All Good Children	Julian	
2010	Parked	Peter	
2011	The Guard	Liam O'Leary	
2011	Eliot & Me	Tom	
2012	Shadow Dancer	Kevin Mulville	IFTA Nom
2012	Good Vibrations	Eric	
2012	Anna Karenina	Nikolai	
2013	The Food Guide to Love	Padraig	
2014	Calvary	Father Leary	
2014	'71	Boyle	
2014	Gold	Ray	
2016	War on Everyone	Pádraic Power	
2017	Breathe	Paddy	
2018	Fantastic Beasts: The Crimes of Grindelwald	Portkey Tout	
2019	Little Joe	Karl	
2019	Calm with Horses	Hector	
2019	Ordinary Love	Peter	IFTA Win
2022	The Wonder	Seán Ryan	
2023	Lies We Tell	Silas	IFTA Nom
2023	Embers	Gary	
2025	Hamnet	John Shakespeare	
2026	Hokum	Jerry	Completed
TBA	No Way Off	TBA	Filming

=== Television ===
Year	Title	Role	Notes
1987	Lapsed Catholics	Fan	Television film
1991	The Treaty	Niall	Television film
1993	The Bill	Kevin Ryan	Episode: "A Malicious Prosecution"
1997	The Tale of Sweeney Todd	Tom	Television film
2002	Ultimate Force	Fintan Maguire	Episode: "The Killing of a One-Eyed Bookie"
2002	Home for Christmas	Damien Quirke	Television film
2003–2004	The Clinic	Dr. Ed Costello	16 episodes - IFTA Nom
2009	Father & Son	Detective Declan Henderson	3 episodes
2009–2010	The Tudors	Ralph Ellerker	5 episodes
2012	Saving the Titanic	Joseph Bell	Television film
2012	Treasure Island	William O'Brien	Television film
2012	Immaturity for Charity	Various	Television film
2012–2016	Ripper Street	Sgt. Donald Artherton	25 episodes
2013	Vikings	Olaf Andwend	Episode: "Rites of Passage"
2016	Murder	Clyde Harris	Episode: "The Big Bang"
2017	Black Sails	Israel Hands	10 episodes
2017	Vera	Mal Hinkin	Episode: "The Blanket Mire"
2018	The Alienist	Captain Connor	10 episodes
2018	Genius	José Ruiz y Blasco	Episode: "Picasso: Chapter One"
2018	Mother's Day	Arthur	Television film
2019	Resistance	Patrick Mahon	4 episodes
2019	The Crown	Arthur Scargill	Episode: "Imbroglio"
2019	Rebellion	Patrick Mahon	2 episodes
2020	The Letter for the King	Slupor	5 episodes
2020	Barkskins	Constable Bouchard	8 episodes
2021–2022	Station Eleven	Clark Thompson	10 episodes
2024	Bodkin	Seamus Gallagher	7 episodes - IFTA Nom
2025	Small Town, Big Story	Keith McCurdle	6 episodes
2025	House of Guinness	Bonnie Champion	
2026	Industry	Edward Burgess	
TBC	The Secret Diary of Adrian Mole Aged 13¾	Mr. Scruton	TV mini series

== Awards and nominations ==
Year	Award	Category	Work	Result	Ref.
2003	Irish Film and Television Awards (IFTA)	Best New Talent	Intermission	Nominated	
2003	Irish Film and Television Awards (IFTA)	Best Supporting Actor in a Film/TV	Intermission	Won	
2004	Irish Film and Television Awards (IFTA)	Best Actor in a TV Drama	The Clinic	Nominated	
2006	Tony Awards	Best Performance by a Leading Actor in a Play	The Lieutenant of Inishmore, Atlantic Theater Company	Nominated	
2006	Outer Critics Circle Awards	Outstanding Actor in a Play	The Lieutenant of Inishmore, Atlantic Theater Company	Nominated	
2006	Theatre World Award		The Lieutenant of Inishmore, Atlantic Theater Company	Won	
2006	Drama League Awards	Award for Distinguished Performance	The Lieutenant of Inishmore, Atlantic Theater Company	Nominated	
2006	Lucille Lortel Award	Outstanding Lead Actor	The Lieutenant of Inishmore, Atlantic Theater Company	Won	
2013	Irish Film and Television Awards (IFTA)	Best Supporting actor (Film)	Shadow Dancer	Nominated	
2020	Irish Film and Television Awards (IFTA)	Best Actor in a Supporting Role (Film)	Ordinary Love	Won	
2024	Irish Film and Television Awards (IFTA)	Best Lead Actor (Film)	Lies We Tell	Nominated	
2025	Irish Film and Television Awards (IFTA)	Best Supporting actor (Drama)	Bodkin	Nominated	
