= Studs (film) =

2006 Irish film

- Theatrical film poster
- Directed by: Paul Mercier
- Written by: Paul Mercier
- Produced by: Cúán Mac Conghail; Fiach Mac Conghail
- Starring: Brendan Gleeson; David Wilmot; Eanna MacLiam; Liam Carney; Eamonn Owens; Emmett J. Scanlan; Eoin Macken; Domhnall Gleeson
- Cinematography: Ronan Fox
- Edited by: Cúán Mac Conghail
- Music by: John Dunne
- Release date: March 17, 2006 (Ireland)
- Running time: 90 mins.
- Country: Ireland
- Language: English

Studs is a 2006 Irish comedy film, written and directed by Paul Mercier. It stars Brendan Gleeson, David Wilmot, Eamonn Owens, Emmett J. Scanlan, Domhnall Gleeson, Eoin Macken, Liam Carney, and Eanna MacLiam. It premiered in Ireland on St. Patrick's Day in 2006.

== Synopsis ==
Emmet Rovers are the team at the bottom of the league, and after losing their manager, they are now faced with the loss of their home grounds. Maybe a manager can bring some luck for the team.

== Cast ==
- Brendan Gleeson as Walter Keegan
- David Wilmot as Bubbles
- Eanna MacLiam as Hopper
- Liam Carney as Isaiah
- Eamonn Owens as Virgil
- Emmett J. Scanlan as Jake
- Domhnall Gleeson as Trampis
- Eoin Macken as Tosh
- Phelim Drew as Ref. Mr. Duffy
- Philip O'Sullivan as Coun. McGuirk
- David Herlihy as Danny
- Tomás Ó Súilleabháin as Kevin

== Reception ==
Séamus Leonard of RTÉ graded the film 1/5 stars, and opined that the film is "terribly dated".
