= Speed Dating (2007 film) =

2007 Irish film

- Theatrical film poster
- Directed by: Tony Herbert
- Written by: Tony Herbert
- Produced by: John Conroy; Tony Herbert
- Starring: Hugh O'Conor; Emma Choy; Nora-Jane Noone; David Hayman; Olga Wehrly; Don Wycherley
- Cinematography: John Conroy
- Edited by: Kate Walshe
- Release dates: March 17, 2007 (ÉCU); April 20, 2007 (Ireland)
- Running time: 85 mins.
- Country: Ireland
- Language: English

Speed Dating is a 2007 Irish romantic comedy film, written and directed by Tony Herbert. It stars Hugh O'Conor, Nora-Jane Noone, Emma Choy, Don Wycherley, Olga Wehrly, and David Hayman. It premiered at the ÉCU The European Independent Film Festival in 2007, before being released in Ireland later that same year.

== Synopsis ==
James is approaching his 30th birthday. After the break-up with the love of his life, he has taken up speed dating without much success. Despondent, he turns his attention towards a mysterious young woman who frequents his local pub.

== Cast ==
- Hugh O'Conor as James Van Der Bexton
- Emma Choy as Susan King
- Nora-Jane Noone as Juliet Van Der Bexton
- David Hayman as Dr. Birmingham
- Paul Ronan as Dan Moran
- Shashi Rami as Leo Judge
- Olga Wehrly as Victoria Grant
- Charlotte Bradley as Beatrice Van Der Bexton
- Gerry O'Brien as Basil Van Der Bexton
- Phelim Drew as Dr. Jack Goldenberg
- Don Wycherley as Det. Noel Long
- Luke Griffin as Det. Brendan McCardle
- Tony Herbert as Simon Elliott
- Flora Montgomery as Jennifer
- Liam Carney as Jupiter
- Anne Marie McAuley as Amber
- Aaron Monaghan as Bookshop Manager
- Kate Stanley-Brennan as Bookshop Assistant

== Reception ==
David McDonnell of RTÉ called the film "a thoroughly enjoyable romantic comedy", plus lauded Hugh O'Conor ("first-rate") and Emma Choy ("well-cast") for their performances. But Entertainment.ie referred to the film as "a mess", although they did praise Don Wycherley's performance.
