= Calm with Horses =

2019 Irish drama film

- Theatrical release poster
- Directed by: Nick Rowland
- Written by: Joe Murtagh
- Produced by: Daniel Emmerson
- Starring: Cosmo Jarvis; Barry Keoghan; Niamh Algar; Ned Dennehy; Kiljan Tyr Moroney; David Wilmot
- Cinematography: Piers McGrail
- Edited by: Nicolas Chaudeurge; Matthew Tabern; Andonis Trattos
- Music by: Benjamin John Power
- Production companies: Film4 Productions; Element Pictures; Screen Ireland; DMC Film; WRAP Fund
- Distributed by: Altitude Film Distribution (United Kingdom); Element Pictures (Ireland)
- Release dates: 8 September 2019 (TIFF); 13 March 2020 (Ireland)
- Running time: 101 minutes
- Countries: Ireland; United Kingdom
- Language: English
- Box office: $104,946

Calm with Horses (a.k.a. The Shadow of Violence, as released in the USA) is a 2019 Irish crime drama film directed by Nick Rowland in his feature debut, and written by Joe Murtagh. It concerns an ex-boxer who works as an enforcer for a criminal family in rural Ireland while providing for his autistic son. The film stars Cosmo Jarvis, Barry Keoghan, Niamh Algar, Ned Dennehy, Kiljan Moroney, and David Wilmot. It is adapted from the short story of the same name from the collection Young Skins by Colin Barrett.

It had its world premiere at the Toronto International Film Festival on 8 September 2019. It was released in Ireland on 13 March 2020 by Altitude Film Distribution.

== Plot ==
Douglas "Arm" Armstrong, a retired boxer, now works as muscle for the Devers crime family after accidentally killing an opponent in the ring. Under the orders of his close friend and boss Dympna Devers, Arm beats a Devers associate named Fannigan for drunkenly trying to climb in under the sheets of bed of Dympna's youngest sister, 14 year old Charlie, although he insists he did not intend to molest her.

Arm visits his estranged partner Ursula and their autistic son Jack who both live with mother. Ursula and Arm still have feelings for one another, but the Devers family is dangerous and Arm has trouble coping with Jack's outbursts and understanding his needs. Ursula is moving on, she has been taking Jack to therapeutic horseback riding sessions at a local farm and is also dating the therapist Rob. She has enrolled Jack ina special needs school in Cork and asks Arm to help pay for the tuition.

Dympna and Arm are summoned to the Devers farm, where Dympna's uncles Paudi and Hector run the family business. Hector says he heard about Charlie and admonishes the pair for letting Fannigan live, giving them one chance to kill Fannigan themselves. Paudi subtly threatens to kill Jack if Arm cannot follow through on these orders. Dympna gets Arm high, and tells him to push Fannigan off the edge of the seaside cliff. Arm prepares to strike him with a stone and cast him naked into the sea, making it look like a suicide, but cannot bring himself to do it. Instead, he tells Fannigan to leave town and never return. Arm tells Dympna he followed through on the murder, and Dympna tells his uncles.

Arm starts visiting Jack when he is with the horses and offers to take more responsibility for Jack, impressing Ursula. However, Jack becomes overstimulated at a fair under Arm's care and has an episode, causing Arm to panic and return Jack to his grandmother. Ursula tries confronting Arm at Dympna's house, but the Devers accuse her of abusing drugs while pregnant with Jack and using Arm for his money. Arm promises to make things right with Ursula and Jack and to provide money for the school in Cork, but urges Ursula to stay away from the Devers in the meantime.

Dympna and Arm are again called to the farm, this time to discuss Fannigan's murder with Paudi. Arm maintains his lie that he killed the man, but Paudi reveals Fannigan's corpse in a barn, evidently tortured to death. Paudi orders Dympna to kill Arm for his disloyalty, but Dympna allows Arm to flee for his life. Arm successfully escapes, but is shot in the side by Paudi. Arm makes his way to the house of Maire, a wealthy widow Hector has been seeing and attempts to rob her so Jack and Ursula can get to Cork and escape the Devers' wrath.

Dympna calls Arm's cell phone with Paudi beside him to try and call him back to the farm with threats to Jack and Ursula. Arm takes Hector hostage and tells Paudi to meet him at Maire's house. Hector escapes in Arm's car, and Maire tries convincing Arm to see a doctor for his gunshot wounds. Recognizing Arm as the boxer who accidentally killed his opponent, Maire tells him his loved ones would not want this for him. He allows her to leave with her savings, but stays himself to await Paudi. Ursula calls Arm to announce she got a job at the special education school in Cork, which will pay for most of Jack's fees. Arm apologizes for acting so immaturely and tells Ursula he loves her. As Paudi pulls into the widow's driveway, Arm ends the call and waits in a chair with a hammer, bleeding out rapidly. The final scene sees Ursula packing to move to Cork, then walking Jack to his new school.

== Cast ==
- Cosmo Jarvis as Douglas "Arm" Armstrong
- Barry Keoghan as Dympna Devers
- Niamh Algar as Ursula Dory
- Ned Dennehy as Paudi Devers
- Kiljan Tyr Moroney as Jack Dory
- David Wilmot as Hector Devers
- Bríd Brennan as Maire Mirkin
- Anthony Welsh as Rob
- Simone Kirby as June Devers
- Hazel Doupe as Charlotte "Charlie" Devers
- Ryan McParland as Needles
- Ally Ní Chiárain as Mrs. Dory
- Liam Carney as Fannigan
- Toni O'Rourke as Lisa Devers
- Róisín O'Neill as Fatima Devers
- Rory Quinn as Brandon

== Production ==
In April 2018, it was announced Cosmo Jarvis, Barry Keoghan and Niamh Algar had joined the cast of the film, with Nick Rowland directing from a screenplay by Joe Murtagh. Michael Fassbender served as an executive producer via his DMC Film banner.

== Release ==
The film had its world premiere at the Toronto International Film Festival on 8 September 2019. It was released in Ireland on 13 March 2020 by Altitude Film Distribution. Saban Capital Group acquired the American distribution rights to the film. and released it via its dedicated division, Saban Films, under the title The Shadow Of Violence It was also released on VOD by Lionsgate Home Entertainment on 1 September 2020.

== Reception ==
=== Box office ===
Calm with Horses grossed $104,946 worldwide.

=== Critical response ===
The film was well-received by critics. Of the 69 reviews compiled on review aggregator Rotten Tomatoes, 94% are positive, with an average of 7.5/10. The website's critical consensus reads: "Calm with Horses presents a grimly effective portrait of one man's struggle with divided loyalties, elevated by standout performances from a stellar cast." Metacritic, which uses a weighted average, assigned the film a score of 67 out of 100, based on 14 critics, indicating "generally favorable" reviews.

=== Accolades ===
Award	Date of ceremony	Category	Recipient(s)	Result	Ref.
British Independent Film Awards	18 February 2021	Best British Independent Film	Nick Rowland, Joe Murtagh and Daniel Emmerson	Nominated	
British Independent Film Awards	18 February 2021	Best Director	Nick Rowland	Nominated	
British Independent Film Awards	18 February 2021	Best Performance by an Actor	Cosmo Jarvis	Nominated	
British Independent Film Awards	18 February 2021	Best Supporting Actor	Barry Keoghan	Nominated	
British Independent Film Awards	18 February 2021	Best Supporting Actress	Niamh Algar	Nominated	
British Independent Film Awards	18 February 2021	Most Promising Newcomer	Niamh Algar	Nominated	
British Independent Film Awards	18 February 2021	The Douglas Hickox Award (Best Debut Director)	Nick Rowland	Nominated	
British Independent Film Awards	18 February 2021	Best Debut Screenwriter	Joe Murtagh	Nominated	
British Independent Film Awards	18 February 2021	Best Casting	Shaheen Baig	Nominated	
British Independent Film Awards	18 February 2021	Breakthrough Producer	Daniel Emmerson	Nominated	
British Academy Film Awards	11 April 2021	Best Actress in a Supporting Role	Niamh Algar	Nominated	
British Academy Film Awards	11 April 2021	Best Actor in a Supporting Role	Barry Keoghan	Nominated	
British Academy Film Awards	11 April 2021	Best Casting	Shaheen Baig	Nominated	
British Academy Film Awards	11 April 2021	Outstanding British Film	Nick Rowland, Daniel Emmerson and Joe Murtagh	Nominated	
Irish Film & Television Awards	18 October 2020	Best Film (2020)	Calm with Horses	Nominated	
Irish Film & Television Awards	18 October 2020	Best Script	Joe Murtagh	Nominated	
Irish Film & Television Awards	18 October 2020	Best Actress in a Supporting Role – Film	Niamh Algar	Won	
Irish Film & Television Awards	18 October 2020	Best Actor in a Supporting Role – Film	Barry Keoghan	Nominated	
Irish Film & Television Awards	18 October 2020	Best Production Design	Damien Creagh	Nominated	

== See also ==
- 2019 in film
