= Fundación Aladina =

Fundación Aladina is a Spanish nonprofit organization founded in 2005, whose aim is to make sure that children fighting against cancer never lose their smiles. Aladina also works with the families to make the long stays at the hospital more comfortable. The organization´s main goal is to help the children and their families through three integral means of support: emotional, material and psychological.

The main project of the foundation has been the creation of a Bone Marrow Transplant center. It is the number one center in Spain and is located in the Hospital Infantil Universitario Niño Jesús and admits many patients every year at national level. The organization is working on the renovation of the ICU in the Niño Jesus Hospital.

== History ==
In the year 2001, Paco Arango, creator and producer of the series ¡Ala... Dina!, began working in the Hospital Niño Jesús as a volunteer in the Oncology section. He comments on his experience, sharing that:

"I used to spend some hours sharing games with children with cancer. Little by little I began to establish friendships with the families and the children, many of them teenagers, who couldn't or didn't want to go to the games room. That changed my life and, what used to be weekly visit, ended up being a daily activity"

Through this experience and with the potential promise of being able to meet specific needs of the patients and their families, he decided to start Fundación Aladina in the year 2005 in the Hospital Niño Jesús.

In 2013, they created the Maktub Center in the same hospital, opening up the possibility of extending their reach to other hospitals in Madrid with different Volunteer programs that also offered material and psychological help for the patients with cancer. Since then, different programs have been developed in various hospitals throughout Spain, reaching more than 1,200 patients every year. Thanks to their work, they have received many acknowledgements and prizes.

== Aladina's ICU in the Niño Jesus Hospital ==
Launched in February 2016, the campaign is already underway to raise the 1,300,000€ needed for the renovation to take place. Part of the campaign includes sending a text to donate money to the project.

The remodel will include 14 beds with robotic arms, 6 private units, and will give control over natural and artificial light while being energy efficient. This project is being realized through the "Achuchón" campaign, which began in February 2016. In spanish achuchón means both hug and push, and their campaign slogan is to give an "achuchón" for the new ICU at the hospital, meaning to give both a hug but also a push in the direction on the renovation.

== Maktub Center ==
In February 2013, Fundación Aladina inaugurated the Maktub Center, which had been the most ambitious project until the launch of their latest campaign to renovate the entire ICU at the Niño Jesus Hospital. In the first twelve months at the Maktub center there were 63 transplants.

Maktub Center cost more than €500,000. It has been designed as a center in which patients can feel comfortable, as the atmosphere is ideal for their recovery during the long periods of time they must spend here.

The project was mainly financed by the benefits received from the movie Maktub, which was directed and produced by the president, Paco Arango, as well as with the collaboration of other organizations and individuals who decided to support this important project.

== Regional Mothers-Milk Bank Aladina-MGU ==
Apart from all the reforms made for patients with cancer, the foundation has also reformed the Mothers Milk Bank of the Hospital Doce de Octubre. It is the first bank of this type in all the peninsula and has been fully functioning since 2007. Up to the date of the reform, it was equipped with a system that could provide 600 liters of breast milk every year for children that couldn't be breast fed by their mothers. Once the reform was done, the hospital was prepared with a regional bank, allowing them to give out 2,000 liters of breast milk to all the Community of Madrid
