= Sunlight (2023 film) =

2023 Irish film

- Theatrical film poster
- Directed by: Claire Dix
- Written by: Ailbhe Keogan
- Produced by: Roisin Geraghty
- Starring: Barry Ward; Liam Carney; Maureen Beattie; Mark O'Halloran; Ericka Roe; Lydia McGuinness; Gus McDonagh; Tony Doyle
- Cinematography: Narayan Van Maele
- Edited by: Tony Cranstoun; Alec Moore
- Music by: Matthew Nolan; Stephen Shannon
- Release dates: February 25, 2023 (Dublin); June 16, 2023 (Ireland)
- Running time: 95 mins.
- Country: Ireland
- Language: English

Sunlight is a 2023 Irish dramedy film, directed by Claire Dix and written by Ailbhe Keogan. The film stars Barry Ward, Liam Carney, Maureen Beattie, and Mark O'Halloran. It premiered in 2023 at the Dublin International Film Festival.

== Synopsis ==
A recovering addict who is caring for his terminally ill sponsor.

== Cast ==
- Barry Ward as Leon
- Liam Carney as Iver
- Maureen Beattie as Maria
- Mark O'Halloran as Cleggs
- Ericka Roe as Angela
- Lydia McGuinness as Anita
- Gus McDonagh as Jimmy
- Tony Doyle as Deano

== Reception ==
On the review aggregator website Rotten Tomatoes, 78% of 9 critics' reviews are positive, with an average rating of 5.30/10.

Liam Hanlon of Film Ireland lauded the screenplay, stating "the script from Ailbhe Keogan achieves a tonal balance with moments of levity and glimmers of optimism". Fionnuala Halligan of Screen Daily commended director Claire Dix for "taking on hefty subject manner".

Wendy Ide of The Observer, who gave the film 3/5 stars, praised Barry Ward's performance as a standout, saying he "excels as a recovering drug addict". Alan Zilberman of the Washington City Paper said that "the story avoids schmaltz because it is infused with passion and exuberance" and also applauded Ward for "elevating the material" with his performance.

Andrew Murray of The Upcoming also gave it 3/5 stars and highlighted "endearing turns from Liam Carney and Maureen Beattie". However, Peter Bradshaw of The Guardian chastised the film for being "well-intentioned but implausible" and rated it 2/5 stars.
