= Middletown (2006 film) =

2006 Northern Irish film

- Theatrical film poster
- Directed by: Brian Kirk
- Written by: Daragh Carville
- Produced by: Michael Casey
- Starring: Matthew Macfadyen; Daniel Mays; Eva Birthistle; Gerard McSorley; Richard Dormer; David Wilmot; Sorcha Cusack; Mick Lally; Bronagh Gallagher; Charlene McKenna; Lalor Roddy; Marie Jones
- Cinematography: Adam Suschitzky
- Edited by: Tim Murrell
- Music by: Debbie Wiseman
- Release dates: April 28, 2006 (Tribeca); November 3, 2006 (Ireland); March 2, 2007 (UK)
- Running time: 88 minutes
- Countries: Ireland; United Kingdom
- Language: English

Middletown is a 2006 Irish-British drama film, written by Daragh Carville and directed by Brian Kirk. It stars Matthew Macfadyen, Daniel Mays, Eva Birthistle, Gerard McSorley, Richard Dormer, David Wilmot, Sorcha Cusack, Mick Lally, Charlene McKenna, Bronagh Gallagher, Marie Jones, and Lalor Roddy. It premiered at the Tribeca Festival in 2006, before being released in Ireland later that year and the UK the following year of 2007.

== Synopsis ==
An overzealous priest returns to his home town and ends up battling against his brother for the heart of the locals.

== Cast ==
- Matthew Macfadyen as Gabriel Hunter (adult)
  - Tyrone McKenna as Gabriel Hunter (young)
- Daniel Mays as Jim Hunter (adult)
  - Niall Wright as Jim Hunter (young)
- Gerard McSorley as Bill Hunter
- Eva Birthistle as Caroline Hunter
- Richard Dormer as Ned (adult)
  - John Joseph Mcneill (young)
- David Wilmot as Sammy (adult)
  - Declan McGee as Sammy (young)
- Sorcha Cusack as Mrs. Lennon
- Mick Lally as Rev. Clay
- David Herlihy as Bap Miller
- Bronagh Gallagher as Tessie
- Charlene McKenna as Adele
- Lalor Roddy as Bin
- Frankie McCafferty as Pokey
- Marie Jones as Agnes
- Larry Cowan as Villager (uncredited)
- Daragh Carville as Bar Patron (uncredited)

== Reception ==
Michael Doherty of Mad About Movies proclaimed the film to be "one of the finest films to emerge from Ireland" in quite some time. Mike Goodridge of Screen Daily labelled it "a melodramatic brew" and praised Daniel Mays for his "compelling performance".

Harry Guerin of RTÉ lauded Matthew Macfadyen for his "chilling performance", but opined that the film "didn't live up to its full potential". Jane Ruffino of Estudios Irlandeses chided the film, stating "Brian Kirk's attempt to satirise the bleakness of 1960s Ireland is just yet another foggy, formless Irish film", although she did commend him for being "a talented director".
