= Gold (2014 film) =

2014 film by Niall Heery

- Film poster
- Directed by: Niall Heery
- Written by: Brendan Heery; Niall Heery
- Produced by: Tristan Lynch; Aoife O'Sullivan
- Starring: James Nesbitt; David Wilmot; Kerry Condon; Maisie Williams
- Cinematography: Tim Fleming
- Edited by: Tony Cranstoun
- Music by: Niall Byrne
- Production companies: Subotica; Gloucester Place Films
- Distributed by: Wildcard Distribution
- Release dates: 22 February 2014 (JDIFF); 10 October 2014 (Ireland)
- Running time: 88 minutes
- Country: Ireland
- Language: English
- Box office: $371,745

Gold is a 2014 Irish comedy-drama film directed by Niall Heery, who co-wrote the screenplay with his brother Brendan Heery. It stars James Nesbitt, David Wilmot, Kerry Condon, and Maisie Williams. The film follows a man making an unwelcome appearance at the family home for the first time in 12 years.

It premiered at the 12th Jameson Dublin International Film Festival on 22 February 2014, and was theatrically released in Ireland and the United Kingdom by Wildcard Distribution on 10 October 2014. The film was praised for the performances of the cast, with both Nesbitt and Condon receiving IFTA Award nominations.

== Plot ==
Ray, an estranged father, returns to his hometown after an absence of twelve years to visit his dying father. He awkwardly uses the opportunity to reconnect with his ex-partner Alice, mother of his acerbic daughter Abbie. Alice is now in a relationship with the self-important Frank McGunn, Ray's former P.E. teacher. Homeless Ray drives around with an abandoned couch he found tied to the roof of his car. Abbie has ambitions to become an athlete with Frank using her as a training guinea pig for his sports-themed self-help DVD "The Way of The McGunn". Despite good intentions, Ray unwittingly finds himself responsible for almost destroying all their lives.

== Cast ==
- James Nesbitt as Frank McGunn
- Maisie Williams as Abbie
- David Wilmot as Ray
- Kerry Condon as Alice
- Steven Mackintosh as Gerry
- David McSavage as Therapist
- Lucy Parker Byrne as Karen (as Lucy Byrne)
- Patrick Gibson as Devon
- Dónal Haughey as Stuart
- Eddie Jackson as Gym Receptionist
- Martin Maloney as Kenny
- Ashley McGuire as Rosie

== Production ==
Gold was produced by Tristan Lynch and Aoife O'Sullivan for Subotica in association with Gloucester Place Films with funding from the Irish Film Board and the Broadcasting Authority of Ireland. Principal photography took place in Dublin, County Dublin and County Wicklow.

== Reception ==
=== Critical response ===
On the review aggregator website Rotten Tomatoes, 67% of 9 critics' reviews are positive, with an average rating of 5.3/10.

Leslie Felperin of The Guardian gave Gold 3 out of 5 stars, and felt "it's quite pleasing that everything doesn't quite work out according to the divine rules of quirky indie comedy." Geoffrey Macnab of The Independent described the film as "a potentially dark family drama [which] is handled in disconcertingly flippant fashion." George Byrne of the Irish Independent concluded his review by stating: "The whole tone of Gold just doesn't hang together, being neither funny at all nor serious enough to be taken seriously." Donald Clarke of The Irish Times gave the film 4 out of 5 stars, and opined that it "remains the sort of picture you want to hug indulgently to a welcoming bosom." Clarke also wrote: "There's not a great deal of plot to the piece. But it gets by on strong performances and convincing characterisation."

=== Accolades ===
Year	Award	Category	Recipient	Result
2014	9th Dublin Film Critics' Circle Awards	Top 10 Irish Film	Gold	7th place
2015	12th Irish Film & Television Awards	Best Actor in a Supporting Role in a Feature Film	James Nesbitt	Nominated
2015	12th Irish Film & Television Awards	Best Actress in a Supporting Role in a Feature Film	Kerry Condon	Nominated
