= Barry Keoghan =

Irish actor (born 1992)

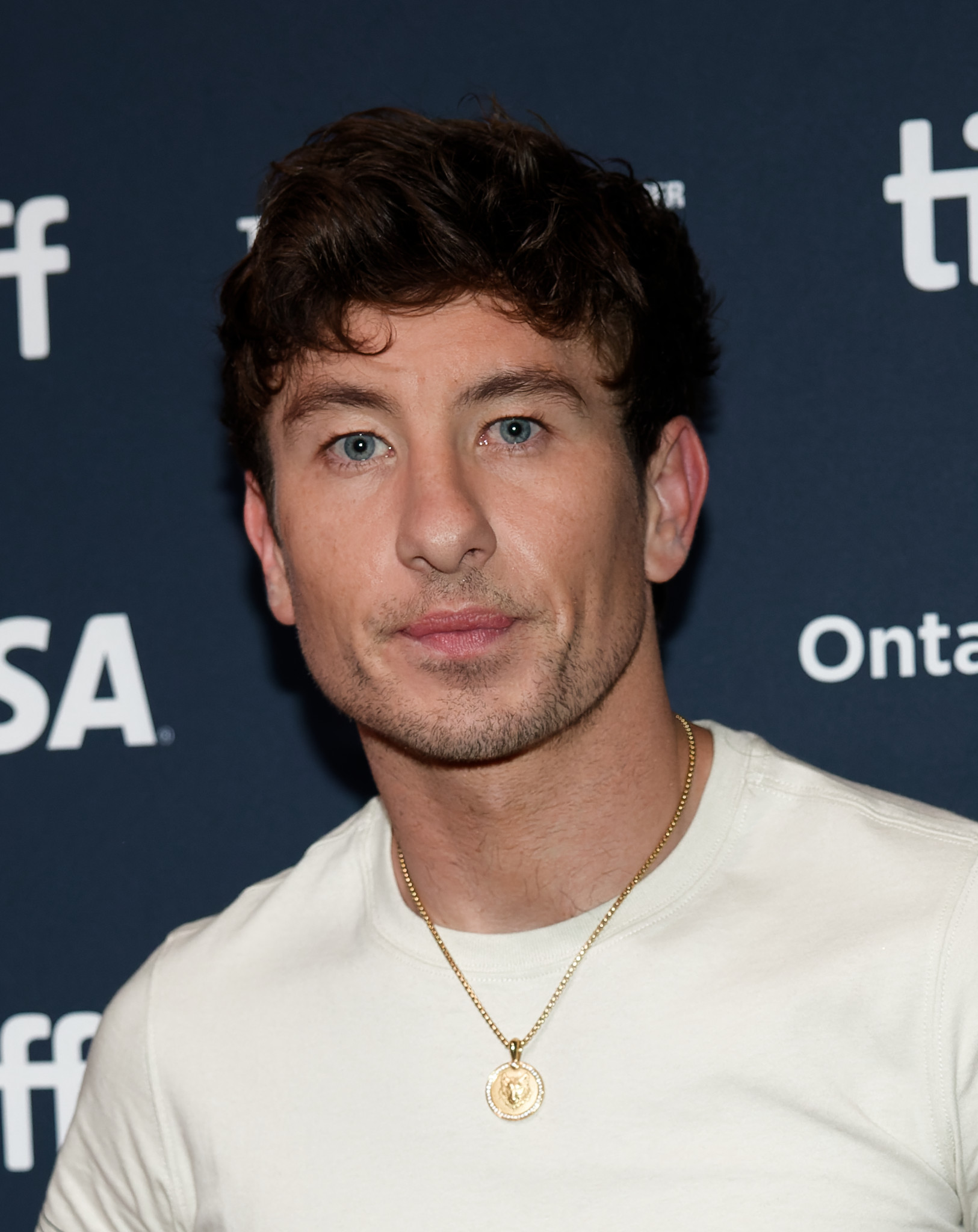
- Keoghan in 2024
- Born: 18 October 1992 (age 34) (Note: Some sources state that Keoghan was born on 18 October 1992. Other sources state that he was born on 17 October 1992. However, Keoghan has stated on X that he was born on 18 October.); Dublin, Ireland
- Occupation: Actor
- Years active: 2010–present
- Partner: Alyson Kierans (2021–2023)
- Children: 1
- Relatives: Frank Stapleton (cousin)
- Awards: Full list

Barry Keoghan (/ˈkjoʊɡən/ KYOH-gən; born 18 October 1992) is an Irish actor. His accolades include a BAFTA Award, along with nominations for an Academy Award and two Golden Globe Awards. In 2020, he was listed at number 27 on The Irish Times list of Ireland's greatest film actors.

Keoghan's breakthrough came with supporting roles in Christopher Nolan's Dunkirk and Yorgos Lanthimos's The Killing of a Sacred Deer (both 2017). His career progressed with roles in the Irish crime film Calm with Horses (2019), the Marvel Cinematic Universe film Eternals (2021), Martin McDonagh's The Banshees of Inisherin (2022), and the psychological drama Saltburn (2023). For his performance in The Banshees of Inisherin, he won the BAFTA Award for Best Actor in a Supporting Role and earned a nomination for the Academy Award for Best Supporting Actor.

On television, Keoghan appeared in the RTÉ drama Love/Hate (2013), the HBO miniseries Chernobyl (2019), the final season of the Netflix reboot Top Boy (2023), and in the Apple TV+ miniseries Masters of the Air (2024).

== Early life ==
Keoghan was born on 18 October 1992, and grew up in Summerhill, Dublin, Ireland. His mother Debbie was a heroin addict and died in 2003. His father, who was largely absent from his life, died under similar drug-related circumstances. Keoghan has stated that two uncles and a cousin have also died of drug overdoses. With his brother Eric, he spent seven years in foster care, in 13 foster homes, before being raised by their grandmother, aunt, and older cousin Gemma, whom he refers to as his sister.

As a child, Keoghan appeared in school plays in the O'Connell School on Dublin's North Richmond Street but was banned for "messing about". He attributes his film education to sneaking into films with friends at Cineworld, Parnell Street, from which he was eventually barred. After appearing in Between the Canals (2010), Keoghan studied acting at The Factory (now Bow Street Academy), a local Dublin drama school. He remembers "not even having €2.20 to get the bus to The Factory" at that time.

== Career ==
=== 2011–2018: Early roles and breakthrough ===
Keoghan began his acting career in 2010, when he answered a casting notice in a Sheriff Street shop window for the crime film Between the Canals (2010), directed by Mark O'Connor. He also starred in O'Connor's Stalker (2012). At the age of 18, he appeared in the Irish soap opera Fair City. In 2013, Keoghan appeared as Wayne on Love/Hate. The role earned Keoghan recognition in Ireland, and he went on to feature in '71 (2014) and Mammal and Trespass Against Us (2016).

Keoghan appeared in two films in 2017. He featured as George Mills in Dunkirk and starred as Martin Lang in The Killing of a Sacred Deer alongside Colin Farrell and Nicole Kidman. He won the Irish Film and Television Award for Best Supporting Actor for his work in The Killing of a Sacred Deer. The following year, he appeared in Black '47 as Hobson, an English soldier stationed in Ireland during the Great Famine. He also starred in American Animals the same year. He portrayed Spencer Reinhart in the film, based on a real-life theft of rare books from a university library. In 2018, The Hollywood Reporter described Keoghan as "the next big thing" for his film work in the previous three years.

=== 2019–present: Career progression ===
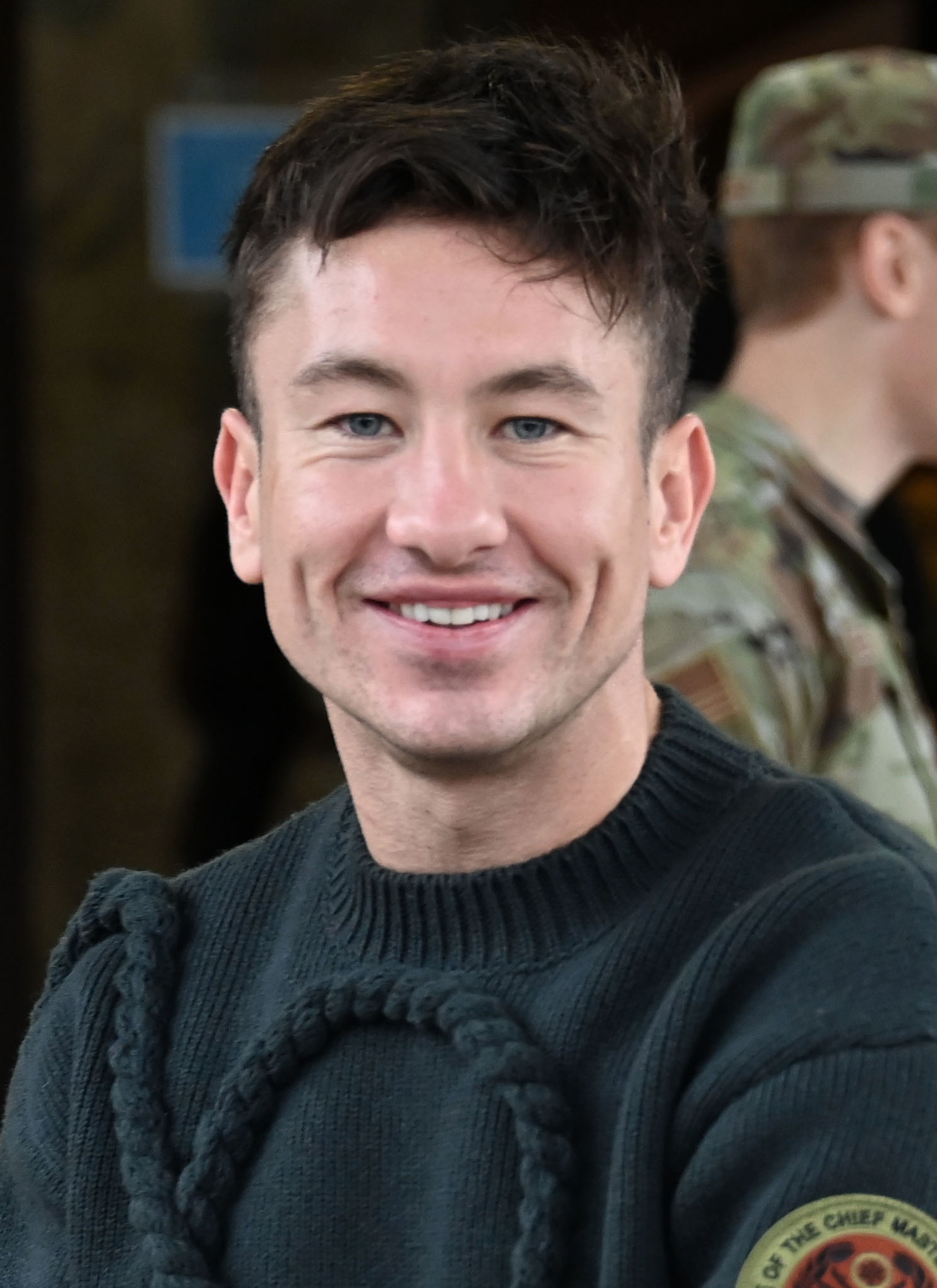
Keoghan in 2024

In 2019, he appeared in the HBO miniseries Chernobyl. and in an episode of Living With Lucy. His work in Calm With Horses was shown in the premiere at the 2019 Toronto International Film Festival. In February 2020, Keoghan left the main series production of Y: The Last Man, in which he had cast lead character Yorick Brown. In 2019, he was nominated for the BAFTA Rising Star Award. In 2021, Keoghan played Druig in the Marvel Cinematic Universe film Eternals, and appeared in The Green Knight.

Keoghan appeared in Matt Reeves's film The Batman (2022), credited as "Unseen Arkham Prisoner", a character subsequently confirmed to be the Joker. Three weeks after the film's release, Warner Bros. released a deleted scene featuring Keoghan's Joker and Robert Pattinson's Batman. Keoghan received an Academy Award for Best Supporting Actor nomination, and won BAFTA Award for Best Actor in a Supporting Role for his performance in the 2022 film The Banshees of Inisherin, written and directed by Martin McDonagh.

In 2023, Keoghan played the lead role of Oliver Quick in Emerald Fennell's psychological thriller Saltburn, alongside Jacob Elordi, Rosamund Pike, Alison Oliver, Richard E. Grant, and Carey Mulligan. Keoghan received critical acclaim for his performance, and was nominated for the Golden Globe for Best Actor. The following year he appeared in Andrea Arnold's Bird, which premiered at the 2024 Cannes Film Festival. Due to scheduling conflicts, he had to drop out of a villain role in Gladiator II. Keoghan was cast as Ringo Starr in a series of four interconnected but separate biopics about the Beatles from filmmaker Sam Mendes. The films are scheduled to be released in April 2028.

=== Ambassador ===
In March 2022, Keoghan was announced as the new ambassador for the Barretstown children's charity. He helped open the charity's new Aladina Studio funded by the Spanish Aladina Foundation.

Keoghan has been a brand ambassador for the Dior luxury brand in 2017. In March 2024, British luxury fashion house Burberry named Keoghan as its brand ambassador.

== Personal life ==
Keoghan is an amateur boxer. He is a supporter of Manchester United and appeared in the club's promotional campaign for the 2024–25 season kit with his second cousin, former United player Frank Stapleton.

In 2020 Keoghan revealed he has ADHD and takes medication for it.

In April 2022, Keoghan was arrested in Dublin for public intoxication. He was later released without charge and issued with a fixed charged notice.

In September 2021, Keoghan began dating Alyson Kierans, a dental nurse and orthodontic therapist. The birth of their son was announced in August 2022. Their relationship ended in mid-2023.

In late 2023, Keoghan began a relationship with American singer Sabrina Carpenter, appearing in the music video for her song "Please Please Please". The pair split in 2024. Afterward, Keoghan claimed to be receiving threats from Carpenter fans directed at himself, his grandmother, and his then two-year-old son. Keoghan also alleged some fans stood outside the home in which his son and ex-girlfriend were living.

In November 2024, Keoghan said in an interview on The Louis Theroux Podcast that a thick skin was required to deal with online hate. In a March 2026 interview with SiriusXM, he said he avoids online platforms and the public because of harsh criticism of himself and his looks, and that it bothers him that his son may read these things later.

== Filmography ==
=== Film ===
Year	Title	Role	Notes	Ref.
2011	Stand Up	Stand up Bully	Short film	
2011	Between the Canals	Aido		
2012	Stalker	Tommy		
2012	King of the Travellers	Young Dublin Lad		
2013	Wasted	Ben	Short film	
2013	Life's a Breeze	Pizza Guy		
2013	Stay	Sean Meehan		
2014	'71	Sean Bannon		
2014	Standby	Crusty		
2014	North	Aaron	Short film	
2015	Norfolk	Boy		
2015	Traders	Ken		
2015	The Break	Sean	Short film	
2016	Mammal	Joe		
2016	Trespass Against Us	Windows		
2016	Candy Floss	Shane	Short film	
2017	Light Thereafter	Pavel		
2017	The Killing of a Sacred Deer	Martin Lang		
2017	Dunkirk	George Mills		
2018	American Animals	Spencer Reinhard		
2018	Black '47	Hobson		
2019	Calm With Horses	Dymphna		
2021	The Green Knight	Scavenger		
2021	Eternals	Druig		
2022	The Batman	Joker	Credited as "Unseen Arkham Prisoner"; cameo	
2022	The Banshees of Inisherin	Dominic Kearney		
2023	Saltburn	Oliver Quick		
2024	Bird	Bug		
2024	Bring Them Down	Jack		
2025	Hurry Up Tomorrow	Lee		
2026	Crime 101	Ormon		
2026	Peaky Blinders: The Immortal Man	Duke Shelby		
2026	Butterfly Jam	Azik		
2026	Lemonade †	Josh		
2028	The Batman: Part II †	Joker	Filming	
2028	The Beatles – A Four-Film Cinematic Event †	Ringo Starr	Filming	
Key: † / Denotes films that have not yet been released

=== Television ===
Year	Title	Role	Notes	Ref.
2011	Fair City	Dave Donoghue	3 episodes	
2013	Jack Taylor: Priest	Hoodie 1	Television film	
2013	Love/Hate	Wayne	6 episodes	
2016	Rebellion	Cormac McDevitt	4 episodes	
2019	Chernobyl	Pavel	Miniseries; 2 episodes	
2023	Top Boy	Jonny McGee	3 episodes	
2024	Masters of the Air	Lt. Curtis Biddick	Miniseries; 3 episodes	

=== Music videos ===
Year	Title	Artist(s)
2024	"Please Please Please"	Sabrina Carpenter
2024	"Bug"	Fontaines D.C.

== Accolades ==
Keoghan has received various accolades, including a BAFTA Film Award and nominations for an Academy Award and two Golden Globe Awards.
