= Bird (2024 film) =

Film by Andrea Arnold

- Release poster
- Directed by: Andrea Arnold
- Written by: Andrea Arnold
- Produced by: Andrea Arnold; Lee Groombridge; Juliette Howell; Tessa Ross
- Starring: Nykiya Adams; Barry Keoghan; Franz Rogowski; Jason Buda; Jasmine Jobson; Frankie Box; James Nelson-Joyce
- Cinematography: Robbie Ryan
- Edited by: Joe Bini
- Music by: Burial
- Production companies: House Productions; Ad Vitam; Arte France Cinéma
- Distributed by: Ad Vitam Distribution (France); Mubi (United States and United Kingdom)
- Release dates: 16 May 2024 (Cannes); 8 November 2024 (United States and United Kingdom)
- Running time: 119 minutes
- Countries: United Kingdom; France; Germany; United States
- Language: English
- Box office: $1.9 million

Bird is a 2024 drama film written and directed by Andrea Arnold and starring Nykiya Adams, Barry Keoghan, and Franz Rogowski.

The film had its world premiere at the 77th Cannes Film Festival on 16 May 2024. The film was theatrically released in the United States and the United Kingdom by Mubi on 8 November 2024. It received positive reviews from critics and was named one of the top 10 independent films of 2024 by the National Board of Review (NY).

== Plot ==
Bailey is a twelve-year-old girl who lives in a run-down building with her father, Bug, and half brother, Hunter. One day, Bug announces his engagement to Kayleigh, a woman he has known for three months with their wedding on the following Saturday. Bailey, in shock and frustration, claims she will not attend and storms off.

Later that day, Hunter tells Bailey he is in a vigilante group with his friends. Intrigued, Bailey follows them and witnesses the group of boys storm into a house and threaten a man with a box cutter. Police are quickly called and Bailey escapes into an empty field where she falls asleep for the night.

The next morning, she is greeted by a mysterious man who calls himself Bird. She follows him to an apartment complex where he searches for a woman who lived there sometime ago, but has little luck finding her. Bailey leaves after this, but notices Bird on the roof of the building before Bug arrives to take her home and grounds her for being out all night.

Bailey learns that Bird was looking for his mother who lived in the apartment complex, and that long ago she disappeared when he was a child. Warming to Bird, Bailey suggests her mother, Peyton, could help Bird as she lived in the complex years ago.

At Peyton's house, Bailey and Bird inquire about the residents, but are interrupted by the attitude of her live-in boyfriend, Skate. An argument ensues between Bailey and Skate, leading Bailey to film him, with Skate threatening to kill Peyton if Bailey shows the footage to the authorities. Despite this, Peyton is able to remember Bird's father's name. Bailey sends the video to Hunter, who promises Bailey he and his group will attack Skate in order to rescue her mother along with her half-siblings.

Later, Hunter requests Bailey's assistance in delivering a note to his girlfriend Moon asking that the two run away to Scotland, due to her family's disapproval of her recently discovered pregnancy. On the way, a crow follows Bailey and helps her slip the note past Moon's parents.

The next day as Hunter and his friends plan their attack, Bailey takes her half-siblings out for the day to avoid the incident. Bird reappears to help Bailey and the kids to the beach where he attempts to track down his father. When they find his apartment, the man living there denies ever having a son to Bird and Bailey. Later, the man recants his denial and admits to Bird that he was with Bird's mother and they did have a boy, but left shortly after, stating "she was crazy". Bailey consoles a tearful Bird as the group heads back home.

Soon after their return, Skate attempts to barge into their house. Peyton is unsuccessful in stopping him, leading to him assaulting her. Bailey attempts to stop him, but Skate knocks her unconscious. Bird re-enters the apartment and also attempts to defend Peyton, but Skate bashes his head in. While recovering, Bailey witnesses Bird transform into a creature with feathers, large wings, and bird-like eyes. He fights Skate again, this time taking him outside, where Bird knocks him unconscious, grabs him with talons and flies off with his body.

The next morning Bailey discovers that Hunter has left home. She informs Bug and the two run to the train station and discover him alone, devastated that Moon did not follow through with his plans. Bug comforts Hunter, telling him he is too young for parenthood. The three of them ride back home and attend the wedding of Bug and Kayleigh, with Bailey in better spirits about the ceremony. During the reception, Bird shows up unannounced and hugs Bailey goodbye. As he leaves, Bailey's eyes are revealed to be bird-like in the same manner that Bird's eyes were.

== Cast ==
- Nykiya Adams as Bailey
- Barry Keoghan as Bug, Bailey's father
- Franz Rogowski as Bird
- Jason Buda as Hunter, Bailey's half-brother
- Jasmine Jobson as Peyton, Bailey's mother
- Frankie Box as Kayleigh, Bug's fiancée
- James Nelson-Joyce as Skate, Peyton's boyfriend
- Angel Lovegrove as Penna
- Arianna Lovegrove as Kisha
- Michael Lovegrove as Louis
- Joanne Matthews as Debs
- Sarah Beth Harber as Dionne's Mum
- Jason Williamson as Fred
- Rhys Yates as Beck

== Production ==
=== Casting ===
Keoghan reportedly came aboard the project in May 2023 after leaving the cast of Ridley Scott epic Gladiator II. That same month Franz Rogowski was revealed to be in talks to join the cast.

=== Filming ===
Principal photography took place in the south of England with filming locations including Gravesend, Northfleet, Ashford and Bean, Kent in June 2023. In July 2023 filming took place on the Isle of Sheppey. Robbie Ryan served as the cinematographer.

Letters were also dropped to residents of Kent's letter boxes by the film's location manager Mark Lambert.

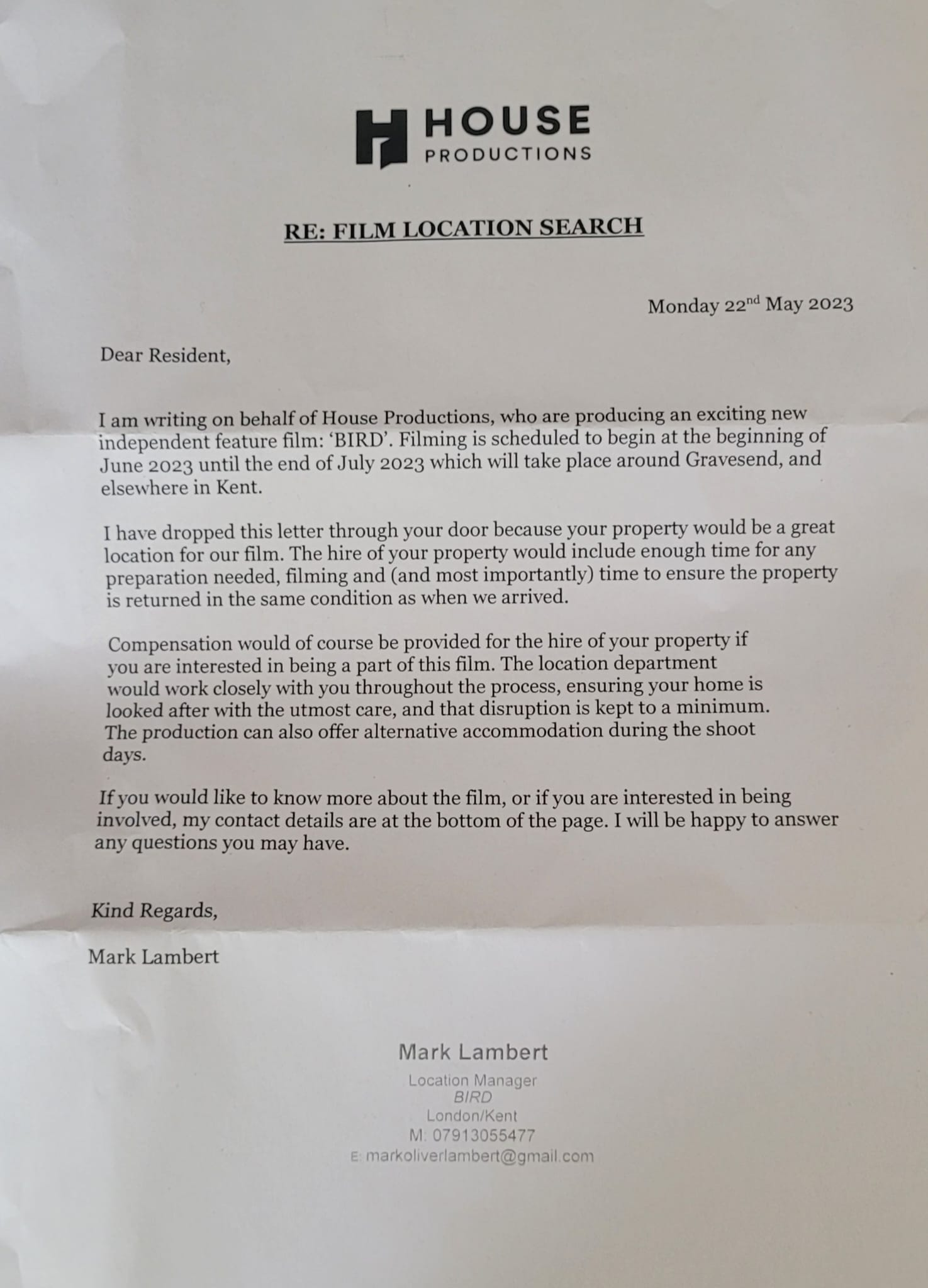
A letter from Bird's location manager attempting to find filming locations.

=== Soundtrack ===
The soundtrack was scored by British electronic artist Burial. It also featured tracks by Fontaines D.C., Blur, Sleaford Mods and Coldplay.

== Release ==
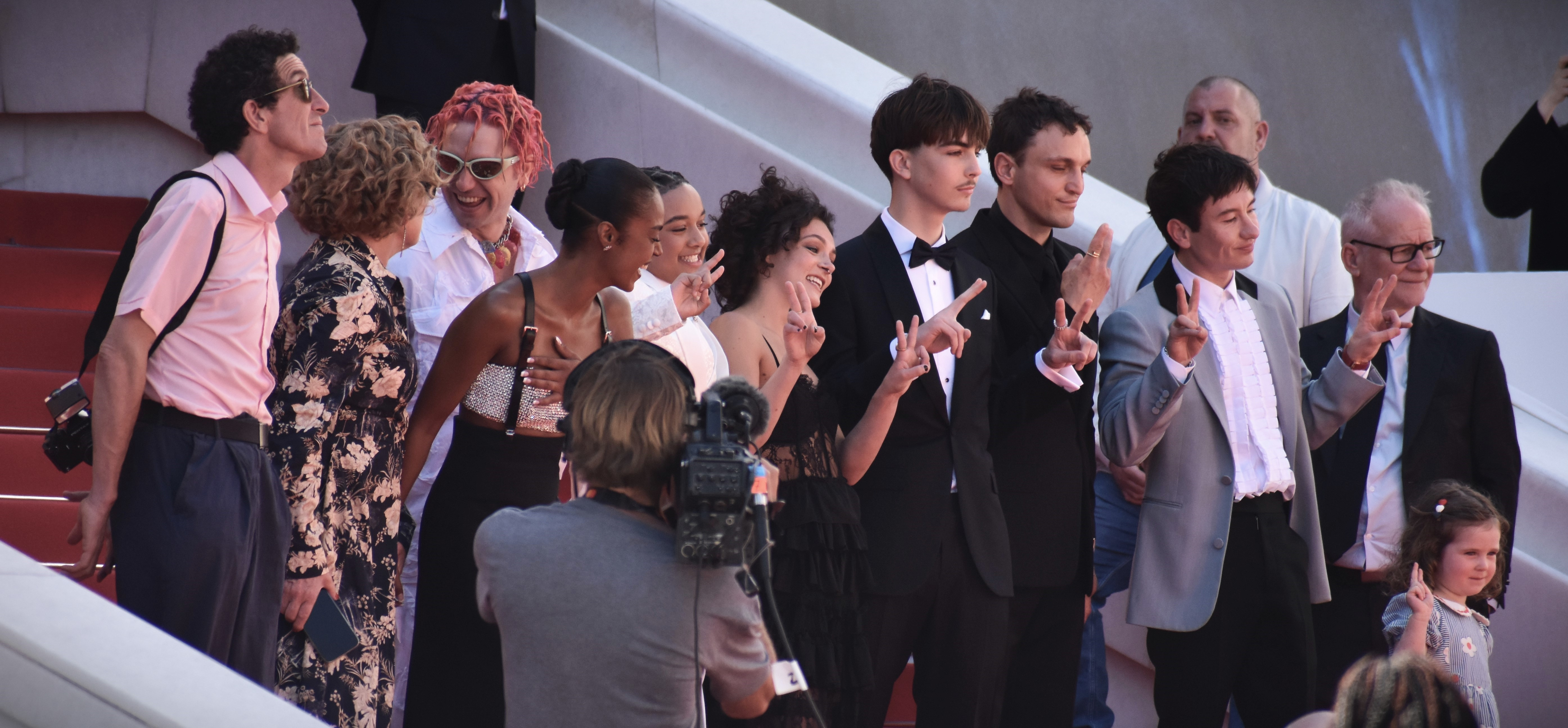
Cast and crew of Bird during its premiere at 2024 Cannes Film Festival

Bird was presented at the European Film Market as part of the Berlin International Film Festival, with Cornerstone Films handling sales. The film was selected in the main competition at the 2024 Cannes Film Festival, where it premiered on 16 May 2024. Prior to, Mubi acquired UK and Irish distribution rights to the film from Cornerstone, then subsequently purchasing the distribution rights for North America and Turkey. The film will also play at the Toronto International Film Festival in September 2024. It was released in theaters by Mubi in the United Kingdom and the United States on November 8, 2024, with a streaming release in Turkey on a later date.

== Reception ==
=== Critical response ===
On Rotten Tomatoes, the film holds an approval rating of 86% based on 131 reviews, with an average rating of 7.4/10. The website's critical consensus reads, "Director Andrea Arnold strikes a coming-of-age chord through Nykiya Adams' moving performance, marrying fantasy and reality to the dizzying end." On Metacritic, the film has a weighted average score of 74 out of 100, based on 36 critic reviews indicating "generally favorable" reviews.

=== Accolades ===
The film received seven nominations at the British Independent Film Awards in November 2024. Robbie Ryan was nominated for Best Cinematography at the Irish Film and Television Awards in January 2025.

Award	Date of ceremony	Category	Recipient(s)	Result	Ref.
Cannes Film Festival	25 May 2024	Palme d'Or	Andrea Arnold	Nominated	
Cannes Film Festival	25 May 2024	Queer Palm	Andrea Arnold	Nominated	
Cannes Film Festival	25 May 2024	Prix de la Citoyenneté	Andrea Arnold	Won	
Cinéfest Sudbury International Film Festival	26 September 2024	Outstanding Female-Led Feature Film	Bird	Won	
National Board of Review	4 December 2024	Top 10 Independent Films	Bird	Won	
European Film Awards	7 December 2024	European Director	Andrea Arnold	Nominated	
European Film Awards	7 December 2024	European Actor	Franz Rogowski	Nominated	
British Independent Film Awards	8 December 2024	Best Director	Andrea Arnold	Nominated	
British Independent Film Awards	8 December 2024	Best Supporting Performance	Barry Keoghan	Nominated	
British Independent Film Awards	8 December 2024	Best Supporting Performance	Franz Rogowski	Won	
British Independent Film Awards	8 December 2024	Breakthrough Performance	Nykiya Adams	Nominated	
British Independent Film Awards	8 December 2024	Best Casting	Lucy Pardee	Nominated	
British Independent Film Awards	8 December 2024	Best Editing	Joe Bini	Nominated	
British Independent Film Awards	8 December 2024	Best Original Music	Burial	Nominated	
