= Undiscovered country =

Undiscovered country may refer to:

- "The undiscover'd country...", from the "To be, or not to be" soliloquy in Hamlet

== Literature ==
- The Undiscovered Country, an 1880 novel by William Dean Howells
- The Undiscovered Country, a 1968 novel by Julian Mitchell
- Undiscovered Country, a 1979 play by Tom Stoppard
- Star Trek VI: The Undiscovered Country, a 1991 novelization by J.M. Dillard
- Undiscovered Country, a 1998 novel by Christina Koning
- My Undiscovered Country, a 2018 short story collection by Cyril Dabydeen
- Undiscovered Country, an ongoing comic book series published by Image Comics and written by Scott Snyder, running since 2019

== Film and television ==
- Star Trek VI: The Undiscovered Country, a 1991 Star Trek film

=== Television episodes ===
- "Undiscovered Country" Shades of Blue season 1, episode 7 (2016)
- "The Undiscovered Country", Dead the Drop Donkey series 4, episode 1 (1994)
- "The Undiscovered Country", Law & Order: Special Victims Unit season 19, episode 13 (2018)
- "The Undiscovered Country", Life Support (British) episode 6 (1999)
- "The Undiscovered Country", Playwrights '56 episode 14 (1956)
- "The Undiscovered Country", The Omega Factor episode 1 (1979)
- "That Undiscovered Country", Then Came Bronson episode 18 (1970)

== Other ==
- The Undiscovered Country, the 1998 album (and song) by the Swedish band Destiny
