= Øyevitne =

- Genre: Drama
- Created by: Jarl Emsell Larsen
- Written by: Jarl Emsell Larsen
- Directed by: Jarl Emsell Larsen
- Opening theme: "Savior Unknown" by Shaun Bartlett
- Country of origin: Norway
- Original language: Norwegian
- No. of seasons: 1
- No. of episodes: 6

Production
- Running time: 60 minutes

Original release
- Network: NRK
- Release: 20 October – 24 November 2014

Eyewitness (Øyevitne) is a Norwegian crime drama from 2014, produced by Norway's NRK. It was written and directed by Jarl Emsell Larsen. The series follows the investigation into a multiple homicide witnessed by two teenage boys. The series was remade for USA Network in 2016 as Eyewitness, for HBO Europe as Valea Mută, and for TF1 in 2018 as Les Innocents.

== Plot ==
Philip and Henning, both 15 years old, live in the small village of Mysen, close to the border between Norway and Sweden. They are classmates and neighbors, but also secretly in love. While secretly meeting at a gravel pit in the nearby forest, they witness the shooting of four members of a criminal gang. The boys are also threatened by the killer, but they manage to overpower him and escape with the murder weapon. To avoid revealing their relationship, they decide to remain silent about being at the scene of the crime.

Helen Sikkeland, the local police chief, is in charge of the investigation into the murder. She is also Philip's foster mother. As the gang violence continues and more resources are devoted to the investigation, the boys' pact of secrecy begins to unravel, causing a rift between Philip and Henning, who is most concerned about revealing why they were in the forest together that night. As Helen continues to search for the truth, Henning is tracked down and attacked by the murderer, who turns out to be much closer to the investigation than anyone realized.

== Cast ==
- Axel Bøyum as Philip
- Anneke von der Lippe as Helen Sikkeland
- Odin Waage as Henning
- Per Kjerstad as Ronny Berg Larsen
- Yngvild Støen Grotmol as Camilla
- Kim Sørensen as Olle
- Yngve Berven as André
- Ingjerd Egeberg as Elisabeth

== Episodes ==
| No. | Title | Directed by | Written by | Original release date |
|---|---|---|---|---|
| 1 | "Episode 1" | Jarl Emsell Larsen | Jarl Emsell Larsen, Kathrine Valen Zeiner & Lasse Nederhoed | 20 October 2014 |
| 2 | "Episode 2" | Unknown | Jarl Emsell Larsen & Kathrine Valen Zeiner | 27 October 2014 |
| 3 | "Episode 3" | Unknown | Jarl Emsell Larsen | 3 November 2014 |
| 4 | "Episode 4" | Unknown | Jarl Emsell Larsen & Kathrine Valen Zeiner | 10 November 2014 |
| 5 | "Episode 5" | Unknown | Jarl Emsell Larsen | 17 November 2014 |
| 6 | "Episode 6" | Unknown | Jarl Emsell Larsen | 24 November 2014 |

== Adaptations ==
In January 2016, USA Network gave a 10-episode straight-to-series order to a US adaptation from Shades of Blue producer Adi Hasak titled Eyewitness. Eyewitness premiered on USA Network on 16 October 2016. Starting from 23 October 2016, HBO Europe presented a four-episode Romanian adaptation of the series, titled Valea Mută (The Silent Valley). In January 2018, TF1 aired a six-episode French adaptation of the series, titled Les innocents (The innocents).

== Awards ==
International Emmy Awards 2015

- Best Performance by an Actress (Anneke von der Lippe) (won)

== See also ==
- List of programs broadcast by the Norwegian Broadcasting Corporation
