= Nive Nielsen =

Greenlandic singer-songwriter and actress

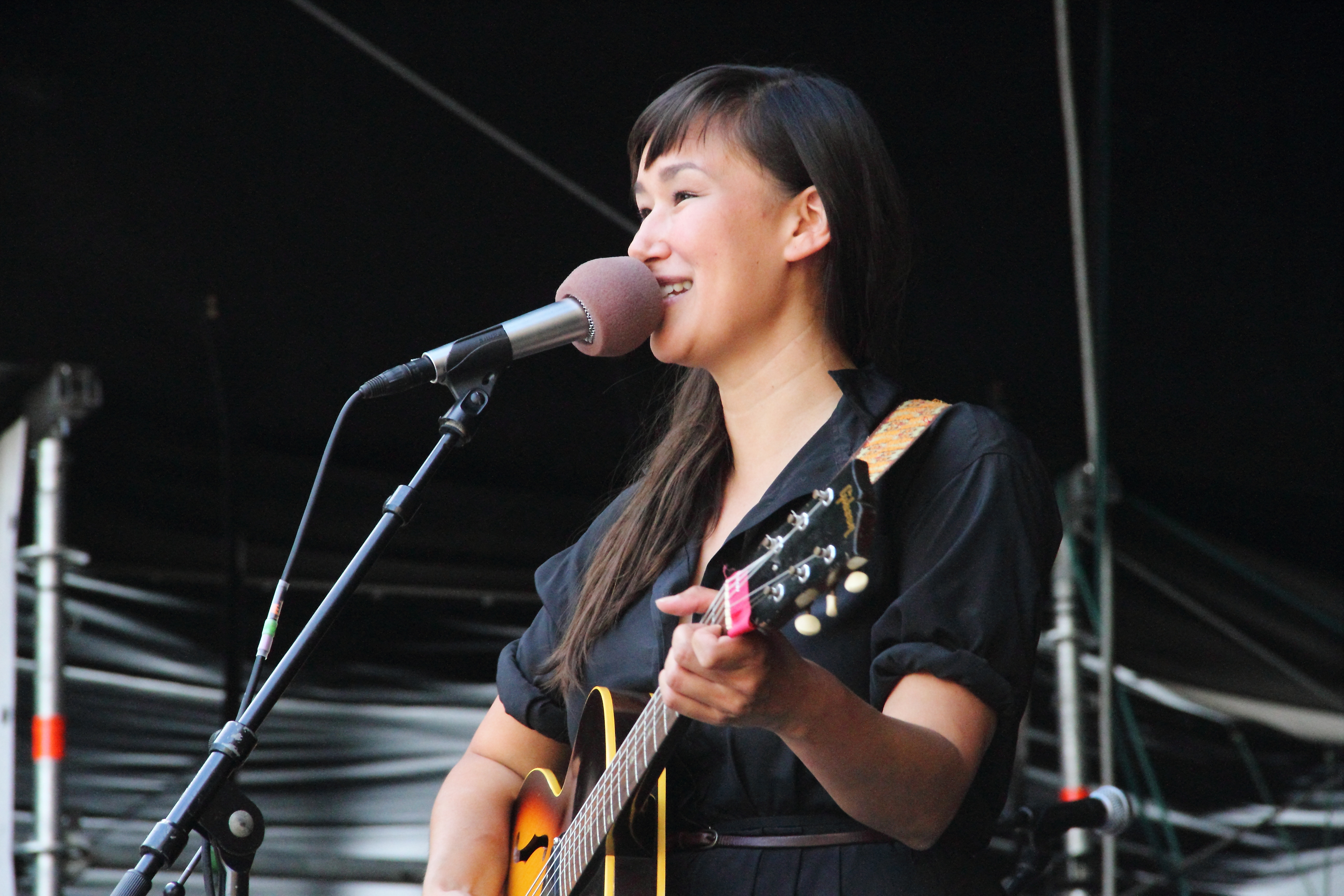
- Nielsen at Rudolstadt-Festival in 2016

Background information
- Born: Nuuk, Greenland
- Genres: Folk, indie
- Occupations: Singer, songwriter, actress
- Instrument: Guitar
- Years active: 2002–present

Nive Nielsen is a Greenlandic singer-songwriter and an actress. An Inuk from Nuuk, Greenland, as a singer-songwriter she plays with her band The Deer Children, often using a little red guitar-ukulele, which kickstarted her music career. The first concert she played was for Margrethe II of Denmark.

She appeared as an Inuk woman in The New World, starring Colin Farrell, in 2005. She also starred in the first season of the AMC supernatural thriller series, The Terror, in 2018. In this series she portrayed an angakkuq (shaman) named Silna, dubbed "Lady Silence" by the crew of Franklin's lost expedition.

== Discography ==
=== Albums ===
==== As part of Nive and the Deer Children ====
As part of Nive and the Deer Children she has released the following albums:

- 2012 – Nive Sings!
- 2015 – Feet First
- 2026 – My Mother's Name

== Filmography ==
=== Movies ===
- 2005 – The New World
- 2019 – Togo

=== Television ===
- 2018 – The Terror as Lady Silence
- 2021 – The North Water as Anna
- 2025 – Washington Black as Uki
