= The Terror (TV series) =

American television series

- Genre: Historical drama; Supernatural horror; Anthology; Psychological thriller
- Created by: Max Borenstein (s. 2); Alexander Woo (s. 2); Victor LaValle (s. 3)
- Based on: The Terror by Dan Simmons (s. 1); The Devil in Silver by Victor LaValle (s. 3)
- Developed by: David Kajganich (s. 1)
- Starring: Season 1: Jared Harris; Tobias Menzies; Paul Ready; Adam Nagaitis; Ian Hart; Nive Nielsen; Ciarán Hinds; Season 2: Derek Mio; Kiki Sukezane; Cristina Rodlo; Shingo Usami; Naoko Mori; Miki Ishikawa; George Takei; Season 3: Dan Stevens; b; Hampton Fluker; John Benjamin Hickey; Judith Light; Aasif Mandvi; CCH Pounder; Stephen Root; Chinaza Uche
- Composers: Marcus Fjellström (s. 1); Mark Korven (s. 2); Dominic Lewis (s. 3)
- Country of origin: United States
- Original languages: English; Japanese (s. 2)
- No. of seasons: 3
- No. of episodes: 26

Production
- Executive producers: David Kajganich (s. 1); Soo Hugh (s. 1); Ridley Scott; David W. Zucker; Alexandra Milchan; Guymon Casady; Scott Lambert; Dan Simmons (s. 1); Edward Berger (s. 1); Alexander Woo (s. 2); Max Borenstein (s. 2); Jordan Sheehan (s. 2); Victor LaValle (s. 3); Chris Cantwell (s. 3); Karyn Kusama (s. 3); Dan Stevens (s. 3)
- Producers: Robyn-Alain Feldman (s. 1); Mitch Engel (s. 2)
- Production locations: Budapest, Hungary (s. 1); Island of Pag, Croatia (s. 1); Vancouver, British Columbia (s. 2)
- Cinematography: Florian Hoffmeister; Frank van den Eeden; Kolja Brandt; Julie Kirkwood (s. 3); Sarah Cawley (s. 3)
- Editors: Tim Murrell; Andrew MacRitchie; Daniel Greenway
- Running time: 40–56 minutes
- Production companies: Scott Free Productions; Entertainment 360; EMJAG Productions; Aquatic Wonders, Inc. (s. 2); AMC Studios

Original release
- Network: AMC
- Release: March 25, 2018 – October 14, 2019
- Network: AMC+; Shudder
- Release: May 7, 2026 – present

The Terror is an American supernatural horror drama anthology television series developed for AMC. Each season is a stand-alone story with a different cast and mostly different crew, each set during a unique historical backdrop also featuring supernatural elements. It premiered on March 25, 2018; after a hiatus following the second season released in 2019, the show was revived in 2024 for a third season that premiered on May 7, 2026, on AMC+ and Shudder and on AMC later in the year.

The first season was developed by David Kajganich who served as co-showrunner alongside Soo Hugh, and is named after Dan Simmons's 2007 novel The Terror which serves as the basis for the story, a fictionalized account of the real lost expedition of Captain Sir John Franklin to the Arctic from 1845 to 1848. The second season, subtitled Infamy, was co-created by Alexander Woo and Max Borenstein and is set in an American internment camp for Japanese Americans during World War II. The third season, subtitled Devil in Silver, was created by Victor LaValle and based on his 2012 novel of the same name.

== Premise ==
=== The Terror ===
The first season begins with the Royal Navy's polar explorer ships HMS Erebus and HMS Terror having recently left Beechey Island in the Canadian Arctic Archipelago, heading south toward King William Island into uncharted territory, seeking to find and confirm the existence and navigability of the fabled Northwest Passage. The ships are soon frozen and trapped in the ice, and those aboard must survive the harsh weather conditions and each other, while being stalked by an elusive menace.

=== The Terror: Infamy ===
The second season takes place on the west coast of the United States during World War II and centers on the Japanese folklore of bakemono, which harasses a Japanese American community in Southern California.

=== The Terror: Devil in Silver ===
The third season follows Pepper, a man who is wrongfully committed to psychiatric hospital, where he must deal with adversarial patients and doctors, as well as the supernatural.

== Cast and characters ==
=== Season 1 ===
==== Main ====
- Jared Harris as Captain Francis Crozier, Commanding Officer of HMS Terror, and expedition second-in-command
- Tobias Menzies as Commander James Fitzjames, First Officer of HMS Erebus
- Paul Ready as Assistant Surgeon Harry Goodsir, HMS Erebus
- Adam Nagaitis as Caulker's Mate Cornelius Hickey, HMS Terror
- Ian Hart as Ice Master Thomas Blanky, HMS Terror
- Nive Nielsen as Silna/Lady Silence, a Netsilik woman
- Ciarán Hinds as Captain Sir John Franklin, Commanding Officer, HMS Erebus, and expedition leader

==== HMS Erebus ====
- Tom Weston-Jones as Commander Graham Gore, First Lieutenant
- Declan Hannigan as Lieutenant Henry Le Vesconte, Second Lieutenant
- Sebastian Armesto as Lieutenant Charles Des Voeux, Second Mate
- Trystan Gravelle as Second Master Henry Collins
- Alistair Petrie as Surgeon Stephen Stanley
- Mike Kelly as Engineer John Gregory
- Gordon Morris as Carpenter John Weekes
- Scott Alexander Young as Ship's Cook Richard Wall
- Daniel Oldroyd as Captain's Steward Edmund Hoar
- John Lynch as Officers' Steward John Bridgens
- Owen Good as Able Seaman Charles Best
- Jack Colgrave Hirst as Able Seaman Tom Hartnell (Note: Brother of John Hartnell)
- Anthony Flanagan as Able Seaman John Morfin
- Sam Rintoul as Ship's Boy George Chambers
- Alfie Kingsnorth as Ship's Boy David Young
- Richard Riddell as Sergeant David Bryant, Royal Marines
- Aaron Jeffcoate as Private William Pilkington, Royal Marines

==== HMS Terror ====
- Matthew McNulty as Commander Edward Little, First Lieutenant
- Christos Lawton as Lieutenant George Hodgson, Second Lieutenant
- Ronan Raftery as Lieutenant John Irving, Third Lieutenant
- Charles Edwards as Assistant Surgeon Alexander McDonald
- Edmund Short as Boatswain John Lane
- Máté Haumann as Captain of the Maintop Thomas Farr
- Kevin Guthrie as Captain of the Foretop Henry Peglar
- Simon Nader as Caulker Thomas Darlington
- Chris Corrigan as Ship's Cook John Diggle
- Liam Garrigan as Captain's Steward Thomas Jopson
- Edward Ashley as Officers' Steward William Gibson
- Charlie Kelly as Gunroom Steward Thomas Armitage
- Guy Faulkner as Able Seaman Samuel Crispe
- Stephen Thompson as Able Seaman Magnus Manson
- Freddie Greaves as Able Seaman William Strong
- Joe Hurst as Ship's Boy Thomas Evans
- Mikey Collins as Ship's Boy Robert Golding
- David Walmsley as Sergeant Solomon Tozer, Royal Marines
- Roderick Hill as Private William Heather, Royal Marines

==== Others ====
- Greta Scacchi as Jane, Lady Franklin, wife of Sir John Franklin
- James Laurenson as Sir John Barrow
- Ian Pirie as a translator
- Richard Sutton as Captain Sir James Clark Ross
- Johnny Issaluk as a Netsilik hunter
- Sian Brooke as Sophia Cracroft, Sir John Franklin's niece
- Apayata Kotierk as a Netsilik shaman, Lady Silence's father
- Clive Russell as Captain Sir John Ross
- Tristan Teller as Charles Dickens
- Vin Hawke as George Barrow

=== Season 2 ===
==== Main ====
- Derek Mio as Chester Nakayama (born Taizo Tanabe), an American-born (Nisei) photographer
- Kiki Sukezane as Yuko Tanabe
- Cristina Rodlo as Luz Ojeda, Chester's Mexican college friend
- Shingo Usami as Henry Nakayama, a fisher and Chester's father emigrated from Japan (Issei)
- Naoko Mori as Asako Nakayama, Chester's mother
- Miki Ishikawa as Amy Yoshida, the Nakayama's family friend
- George Takei as Nobuhiro Yamato, community elder and former fisher captain

==== Recurring ====
- Hira Ambrosino as Fumi Yoshida
- Eiji Inoue as Hideo Furuya
- James Saito as Wilson Yoshida
- Reilly Dolman as Marlon
- Lee Shorten as Walt Yoshida
- Alex Shimizu as Toshiro Furuya
- Yuta Takenaka as Genzo
- Camille Martinez as Miss Antoinette
- C. Thomas Howell as Major Hallowell Bowen
- Reed Diamond as Colonel Stallings
- Christopher Naoki Lee as Ken Uehura
- Aya Furukawa as Sachiko
- Matthew Smalley as MP Corporal Nessler
- Hiro Kanagawa as Dr. Kitamura
- Emi Kamito as Nurse Hasegawa
- Marcus Toji as Arthur Ogawa
- Clayton Chitty as MP Private Burlingham
- Ruben Garfias as Bart Ojeda
- William MacDonald as George Nicol
- Nathan Houle as MP Technical Sergeant Gimbel
- Naomi Simpson as Sister Agatha
- Alma Martinez as Rocío Trujillo
- Juana Lerma Juárez as Paula
- Hugo Ateo as Hector
- Mia García as Elena
- Pierce Kang as Jirou Tanabe
- Francisco Trujillo as Father Ysidro

==== Notable guest stars ====
- Mayumi Yoshida as Shiori
- Peter Shinkoda as Leading Private Ishinabe
- Ted Cole as Major Van Allen
- Jorge Vargas as Deputy Cisneros
- Garry Chalk as Mr. Delaney
- Sab Shimono as Kazu

=== Season 3 ===
==== Main ====
- Dan Stevens as Peter "Pepper" Coffin, a working-class "moving man" wrongfully committed to the New Hyde Psychiatric Hospital
- Michael Aronov as "Huey", one of three plainclothes police officers who arrest Pepper and whom he nicknames "Huey, Dewey, and Louie"
- b as Loochie, a young resident in the New Hyde Psychiatric Hospital
- Philip Ettinger as "Louie", one of three plainclothes police officers who arrest Pepper and whom he nicknames "Huey, Dewey, and Louie"
- Hampton Fluker as Scotch Tape, a nurse at the New Hyde Psychiatric Hospital
- John Benjamin Hickey as:
  - Dr. Walter, the founder of the New Hyde Psychiatric Hospital
  - The "Devil" / the "Duppy", a mysterious, malevolent entity haunting the hospital's residents
- Marin Ireland as "Dewey", one of three plainclothes police officers who arrest Pepper and whom he nicknames "Huey, Dewey, and Louie"
- Judith Light as Dorry, a longtime resident at the New Hyde Psychiatric Hospital
  - Kennedy McMann as young Dorry
- Aasif Mandvi as Dr. Anand, a doctor and facility manager of the New Hyde Psychiatric Hospital
- CCH Pounder as Miss Chris, a nurse and administrator of the New Hyde Psychiatric Hospital
- Stephen Root as Dr. Laurence Badger, a doctor at the New Hyde Psychiatric Hospital who leads a book club
- Chinaza Uche as "Coffee" (real name Kofi Osei), Pepper's roommate at the New Hyde Psychiatric Hospital
- Hayward Leach as Anthony, Pepper's estranged son, who is a social worker
  - Joseph Baucum as young Anthony

==== Recurring ====
- Juani Feliz as Marisol, Pepper's girlfriend
- Maureen Sebastian as Josephine Alzona, a nurse at the New Hyde Psychiatric Hospital who provides money for her family in the Philippines and Dorry is sympathetic to
- Mel Johnson Jr. as Mr. Mack, an older resident at the New Hyde Psychiatric Hospital
- Larry Marshall as Frank Waverly, an older resident at the New Hyde Psychiatric Hospital
- Celia Keenan-Bolger as Sam, a resident at the New Hyde Psychiatric Hospital
- Andrea Syglowski as Sammy, a resident at the New Hyde Psychiatric Hospital

==== Guest ====
- Sean Patrick Folster as Mr. Bromden, a former resident at the New Hyde Psychiatric Hospital who is found deceased in his bed at the beginning of the season
- Manuel Herrera as Ivan, Marisol's abusive ex-husband
- Teagan Meredith as Isabel, Marisol's daughter
- Ali Skamangas as Nancy
- Siddiq Saunderson as Marvin, Mr. Mack's son
- Susanna Guzmán as Loochie's nana
- Luis Rivera Figueroa as Loochie's brother
- Jason Babinsky as Scott
- Maboud Ebrahimzadeh as Sal
- Brittany Bradford as Esther
- Eli Gelb as Ralph, Dorry's husband who had her committed to the New Hyde Psychiatric Hospital in the 1960s
- Robert Sean Leonard as Director Cleave, the head of the review board conducting a formal inquiry into a resident's death
- Stephen Bradbury as Arnold Visserplein, a resident who was brought to the New Hyde Psychiatric Hospital in 1965 and later used as a vessel for a malevolent entity
  - Christopher Rhodes as young Arnold Visserplein
- Andrew Polk as Administrator Ambrose

== Episodes ==
Season	Title	Episodes	Originally released		
Season	Title	Episodes	First released	Last released	Network
1	The Terror	10	March 25, 2018	May 21, 2018	AMC
2	Infamy	10	August 12, 2019	October 14, 2019	AMC
3	Devil in Silver	6	May 7, 2026	June 11, 2026	AMC; AMC+ Shudder

=== Season 1: The Terror (2018) ===
No. overall	No. in season	Title	Directed by	Written by	Original release date (Note: Episodes 4 to 10 were released before their AMC broadcast on Amazon Prime Video in every country where the service is present except the United States, Canada and the United Kingdom.)	U.S. viewers (millions)
1	1	"Go for Broke"	Edward Berger	David Kajganich	March 25, 2018 (Note: This episode was shown as a special preview on March 25, 2018, and then aired its official premiere on March 26, 2018.)	3.34
In 1850, Royal Navy officer James Clark Ross, searching for Sir John Franklin's expedition to find the Northwest Passage, learns from a Netsilik man that Sir John's second-in-command, Francis Crozier, was seen leading a party south, pursued by a supernatural being known as "Tuunbaq". In 1846, sixteen months into the expedition on the ships HMS Erebus and HMS Terror, ship's boy David Young falls deathly ill, while the Erebus's propeller is caught on ice, causing seaman William Orren to go over the side and drown. Young sees a vision of a Netsilik man and screams to assistant Erebus surgeon Harry Goodsir that "he wants us to run" before dying. Caulker's mate Cornelius Hickey steals a ring off of Young's corpse. Second master and Orren's friend Henry Collins unblocks the propeller, but is horrified to find Orren's frozen corpse in the water. Terror captain Crozier, acting on the findings of his ice master Thomas Blanky, advises Erebus captain Sir John to consolidate their resources and take only the Terror east to wait out the winter, but Sir John is adamant that they are close to the Passage and refuses. The ships soon become trapped in the ice.
2	2	"Gore"	Edward Berger	Soo Hugh	March 26, 2018	1.39
In 1845, Sir John presses his niece Sophia Cracroft to reject Crozier's marriage proposals because of his Irish heritage. Eight months after the ships' freezing, lieutenant John Irving catches Hickey and officers' steward William Gibson being intimate. Two search parties are sent to find leads in the ice, but one returns early when they discover some of their food to be rotten. The other finds a message cairn and leaves a note. As Royal Marine David Bryant and commander Graham Gore look for another cairn, the others return to find their sledge boat overturned and fear a polar bear is stalking them. As Gore and Bryant return, the latter shoots at a dark shape he believes to be a bear, only to realize he hit the man from Young's vision. Gore is killed by a massive bear-like creature, and the party hurries back with the dying shaman and his daughter in tow. As Goodsir notices that the man's tongue has been removed, he dies inside instead of out on the ice as his daughter requests after telling her that she now has to control the "Tuunbaq". She warns Crozier that the ships must leave or they will all "disappear."
3	3	"The Ladder"	Sergio Mimica-Gezzan	Gina Welch	April 2, 2018	1.11
"Lady Silence", nicknamed for refusing to speak to the men, is sent off while her father's body is dropped in a fire hole in lieu of a proper burial. Crozier asks for Sir John's permission to go with a party to look for rescue, but Sir John refuses, citing Crozier's alcoholism as why he will never be fit to lead. A Terror cook finds more food to be spoiled. Irving confronts Hickey, having heard about his forceful tendencies from Gibson, and implores him to seek penance in religion. Gibson ends their relationship for good when Hickey tries to pressure him. Sir John joins a hunting party tracking the bear, which ambushes the group and kills Bryant. It drags Sir John into the fire hole, where he falls to his death and the crews find only his severed leg. With Crozier now leading the expedition, he stays with the ships but sends a party led by lieutenant James Fairholme, while Hickey does not attend Sir John's funeral and uses the distraction to defecate on Gibson's bed. As Lady Silence makes camp near the ships, the bear delivers a freshly killed seal to her.
4	4	"Punished, as a Boy"	Edward Berger	David Kajganich	April 9, 2018	1.17
Sophia and Sir John's widow Lady Jane futilely plead with the Admiralty to send a search party for the expedition, and resolve to fund their own rescue. New Erebus captain James Fitzjames argues with Crozier about his lack of enthusiasm as a leader, who admits that he only joined the expedition in hopes that Sophia would marry him for keeping Sir John safe. Goodsir finds that seaman John Morfin's gums are gray. The bear abducts a seaman. His friend goes with Crozier to find him, but Crozier is lured away by the bear and it kills the other man, putting the corpses' bisected halves together for the crews to find. Having seen Lady Silence's symbiotic relationship with it, Hickey learns her location from Royal Marine Solomon Tozer, and, with seamen Magnus Manson and Tom Hartnell, abducts her. Crozier has Manson and Hartnell lashed in response and has Hickey lashed "as a boy" across the buttocks for arguing. Goodsir apologizes to Lady Silence for Hickey's behavior and asks to learn her language.
5	5	"First Shot a Winner, Lads"	Sergio Mimica-Gezzan	Josh Parkinson	April 16, 2018	0.91
As Goodsir and Lady Silence teach each other their languages, Crozier presses him to ask about the bear. Hickey reingratiates himself to Gibson by giving him Young's ring, and asks him to report any dissent amongst the ships' higher-ups. Crozier's drinking worsens as he takes whiskey from the Erebus, to Fitzjames's chagrin. He summons Lady Silence to the Terror and presses her to explain that the "Tuunbaq" is the creature hunting them, and it is "bound to no one now." When she refuses to explain how to kill it, Crozier orders her ejected from the ships, only for a furious Fitzjames to interrupt after learning Crozier stole his personal whiskey stores. The Tuunbaq attacks the Terror, revealing itself to have a human-like face. It chases Blanky up the mast and mauls his leg before he sets it on fire and the crew shoots it with a cannon, forcing it to retreat. Blanky's leg is amputated and Crozier resolves to isolate himself without drink until his alcoholism subsides. Suspecting that Morfin is suffering from lead poisoning, Goodsir tests this by feeding a can of contaminated food to Sir John's pet monkey Jacko.
6	6	"A Mercy"	Sergio Mimica-Gezzan	Vinnie Wilhelm	April 23, 2018	0.92
Deciding that Crozier was right about abandoning ship, Fitzjames plans to do so but, on advice from Blanky based on his experience working under John Ross, orders a carnivale be held to celebrate the first sunrise of 1848 and boost morale. Gibson informs Hickey that the higher-ups are inventorying the ships' containers and Hickey realizes what they are planning. Jacko becomes violent and dies, confirming Goodsir's theory. He tells his superior, Stephen Stanley, and connects it to Young's death and unexplained health problems amongst the crews, but Stanley appears unconcerned. As Crozier is tended to by his steward Thomas Jopson, he recovers in time to attend the carnivale. As he announces to the crews that they will be abandoning the ships, Lady Silence arrives, having severed her own tongue to get the Tuunbaq back under control. A deteriorating Stanley lights the tents and himself on fire, killing several men, while Hickey accidentally kills the Terror's assistant surgeon while cutting an escape opening. The Terror's surgeon dies in the fire, leaving Goodsir the only one remaining.
7	7	"Horrible from Supper"	Tim Mielants	Andres Fischer-Centeno	April 30, 2018	0.97
A few men stay behind on the Terror in case the ice thaws so they can take it back to land, while the rest of the crews abandon the ships. Tozer and Morfin find the bodies of Fairholme's party, killed by the Tuunbaq after only eighteen miles out, and report it to Crozier and Fitzjames. Crozier conceals it as well as the lead poisoning, while Morfin, in agony from his illness, seizes a rifle and is killed by Tozer, who tells Hickey about Fairholme. As Hickey recruits lieutenant George Hodgson for a burgeoning mutiny, Crozier promotes Jopson to lieutenant and learns from Hartnell that gunroom steward Thomas Armitage helped abduct Lady Silence, who is traveling with the crew. While leading a hunting party of Hickey and petty officer Thomas Farr, Irving comes across a group of Netsilik who he trades with for seal meat. Hickey murders him and Farr, and a flashback reveals that he murdered and took the identity and place of the real Cornelius Hickey aboard the Terror.
8	8	"Terror Camp Clear"	Tim Mielants	David Kajganich	May 7, 2018	0.86
As Crozier and Fitzjames update the message Gore left in the cairn, Fitzjames admits that he only attained his rank for covering up a scandal involving Sir John Barrow's son and he was born out of wedlock half-Portuguese, the latter of which he has never told anyone. He begins to show symptoms of scurvy, as does petty officer Harry Peglar, the secret lover of officer's steward John Bridgens. Hickey pins the murders of Irving and Farr on the Netsilik, prompting Hodgson to rally men and kill a nearby family in revenge. While Crozier grows suspicious of Hickey's story, Armitage and Tozer arm his men. Lady Silence is sent away when Crozier realizes the paranoia in camp will likely lead to her death, and orders Goodsir to perform an autopsy on Irving, revealing seal meat in his stomach. Concluding that Irving was fed by the Netsilik, Crozier orders the executions of Hickey and Tozer and informs the crew of Fairholme's party's deaths. The hangings are interrupted by the Tuunbaq, spurred by the family's murder, and Hickey and his men escape in the chaos with a sledge boat and supplies, abducting Goodsir along the way. Fitzjames wounds the Tuunbaq with a Congreve rocket, while an escaping Tozer witnesses it consume Collins's soul.
9	9	"The C, the C, the Open C"	Tim Mielants	Soo Hugh	May 14, 2018	0.78
Lady Jane recruits Charles Dickens in her efforts to fund a search party. Fitzjames's scurvy worsens and he begs Crozier to euthanize him, who complies. Peglar also succumbs, and a heartbroken Bridgens commits suicide by wandering into the wilderness and dying of exposure. The man Ross spoke to orders Lady Silence to use the Tuunbaq to "balance things again" as the crew's presence is disrupting nature. Goodsir realizes Gibson is dying of lead poisoning, so Hickey kills him and forces Goodsir to cut up the body for consumption. Goodsir is shaken to find Young's ring on Gibson's body. Horrified by Collins's death, Tozer posits returning to the Terror to Hickey and begins organizing a party when he is refused. Hickey orders Crozier brought to him, so a defected ship's boy lures a group of Crozier's men out and they are cornered by Hickey's men. Hartnell is killed, and Crozier surrenders and orders lieutenant Edward Little to continue taking their group to civilization. A tearful Sophia stands in the snow without her shoes, something Lady Jane had earlier mentioned she did to feel empathy for Sir John. With his leg turning gangrenous, Blanky covers himself in forks and leaves the crew to lure the Tuunbaq away, accidentally finding the Passage as the Tuunbaq arrives.
10	10	"We Are Gone"	Tim Mielants	David Kajganich	May 21, 2018	0.79
Little demands that the remaining crew rescues Crozier, but is unanimously outvoted. The crew leaves the sick against Crozier's orders, including Jopson, who does not know the situation and dies believing Crozier abandoned him. Goodsir ingests poison and commits suicide; Hickey's men consume him, but Crozier, signaled by Goodsir, eats the soles of his feet to avoid poisoning. Having caught wind of Tozer's plans, Hickey attacks him and takes his men to summon the Tuunbaq. He admits to his weakened men and Crozier that he is an impostor, having planned to escape to the Hawaiian Islands when the ships stopped there. The Tuunbaq arrives and slaughters Hickey's men while he cuts out his tongue in an attempt to control it, but it rejects the tongue and eats him. Heavily injured and weakened from eating Blanky, it chokes to death on Hickey's corpse. Lady Silence arrives and nurses Crozier back to health, and they find that Little's group has cannibalized each other. Little murmurs "close" to Crozier as he dies, referencing Crozier's view that "close is worse than nothing." Lady Silence and Crozier travel to her people (where her name is revealed to be "Silna") and she self-exiles for having "lost" the Tuunbaq. Two years later, Crozier has assimilated into the Netsilik when Ross, having been cleared to search for the expedition after Lady Jane's campaign, arrives. On Crozier's orders, the Netsilik man informs Ross that there is no way to the Passage and that all the men are dead, while an eavesdropping Crozier leaves to hunt seal with his people.

=== Season 2: Infamy (2019) ===
No. overall	No. in season	Title	Directed by	Written by	Original release date	U.S. viewers (millions)
11	1	"A Sparrow in a Swallow's Nest"	Josef Kubota Wladyka	Story by : Max Borenstein & Alexander Woo; Teleplay by : Alexander Woo	August 12, 2019	0.58
The residents of Terminal Island are haunted by a series of mysterious unexplained deaths. Chester, a Japanese-American man, learns that his Mexican girlfriend Luz is pregnant, and contemplates his future. The men of Japanese ancestry are arrested after the news breaks that Japan has attacked Pearl Harbor.
12	2	"All the Demons Are Still in Hell"	Josef Kubota Wladyka	Tony Tost	August 19, 2019	0.45
An evacuation order is given for the residents of Terminal Island who are to be held in internment camps following the Pearl Harbor attack. Chester wants to leave with Luz but is later arrested after a local resident reports him to the FBI. Luz decides to join Chester after telling the FBI agents that she is carrying his child.
13	3	"Gaman"	Michael Lehmann	Shannon Goss	August 26, 2019	0.42
Chester and his family start to settle into life in the internment camp. Some of the residents believe that a bakemono is responsible for the events that have occurred. Furuya is arrested for assault and tells Chester that he wasn't responsible for his actions and that something had possessed him. The camp's children discover Furuya's body the next day in the nearby woods after Yuko kills him. Chester then accepts a translator job with the army and departs the camp. Concerned about the pregnancy, Luz meets with Yuko who is posing as a midwife at the camp to assist her, but she is unaware that Yuko harbors a strong interest in Chester and their unborn child.
14	4	"The Weak Are Meat"	Michael Lehmann	Naomi Iizuka	September 2, 2019	0.38
Chester is stationed in Guadalcanal where he works with the U.S. Army. While on assignment to locate a missing sergeant, Chester uncovers a secret code on a belt of a dead Japanese soldier. Believing he may be haunted by a Yūrei, Chester takes pictures near his camp and closely examines them. Yuko possesses an MP named Nessler and forces him to jump from a watchtower, killing him. Major Bowen believes that Nessler was drunk from contraband sake and orders a crackdown in the camp. Luz is heartened by Chester's letter and thinks about what life would be like when they have a family of their own. Asako takes Luz to see Dr. Kitemura after she goes into labor, which leads Yuko to possess Nurse Hasegawa so she can assist with her birth. But after a difficult labor, the twins are stillborn.
15	5	"Shatter Like a Pearl"	Lily Mariye	Steven Hanna	September 9, 2019	0.36
The Japanese Americans are forced to undertake a humiliating exercise that divides the community. Chester comes face to face with a man who forces him to question his very nature. Luz, stricken by grief after the tragedy, is forced to make an important choice.
16	6	"Taizo"	Everardo Gout	Max Borenstein & Benjamin Klein	September 16, 2019	0.38
A story of the past provides insight into the present evil that stalks the Terminal Islanders. Chester returns home to his family, only to find that someone he was searching for is gone. Henry and Asako are faced with a difficult decision.
17	7	"My Perfect World"	Meera Menon	Danielle Roderick & Tony Tost	September 23, 2019	0.33
The Nakayamas have been torn apart, and Chester searches for the person he believes can help, even if it means taking drastic action. A tuberculosis outbreak in the community forces Amy to act, though she's caught between doing what she's told and doing what's right.
18	8	"My Sweet Boy"	Toa Fraser	Alessandra Dimona & Shannon Goss	September 30, 2019	0.28
Chester and Luz have reached a turning point in their relationship, one that causes an evil force to catch up to them. Amy must take matters into her own hands as she's tormented by a powerful nemesis. Chester meets a boy who gives him answers.
19	9	"Come and Get Me"	Frederick E.O. Toye	Steven Hanna & Naomi Iizuka	October 7, 2019	0.38
The Terminal Islanders return home to find that things have changed since they left. The Nakayamas, still tense from the pain they've inflicted on one another, must come together to battle the spirit that threatens their future.
20	10	"Into the Afterlife"	Frederick E.O. Toye	Alexander Woo	October 14, 2019	0.36
As all seems lost, Henry and Asako must look to the past to provide answers to their current turmoil. Chester and Luz grapple with their identities in hopes of saving those who are dearest to them. Amy and Yamato-san struggle to once again assimilate to American life.

=== Season 3: Devil in Silver (2026) ===
No. overall	No. in season	Title	Directed by	Teleplay by	Original release date
21	1	"November in My Soul"	Karyn Kusama	Victor LaValle	May 7, 2026
A deceased resident is discovered at New Hyde Psychiatric Hospital with severely contorted injuries in rigor mortis, and staff question if it wasn't a suicide. Meanwhile, Pepper, a "moving man" from Queens, buys a drum set to teach music lessons amidst financial strain with his girlfriend Marisol. When Marisol's abusive ex-husband Ivan arrives and becomes aggressive, Pepper intervenes and a fight breaks out, with Pepper unknowingly assaulting a group of plainclothes police officers—whom he nicknames "Huey, Dewey and Louie"—who take him to New Hyde instead of the police station. After Dr. Anand admits Pepper for a 3-day psychiatric hold and he is medicated with haloperidol and placed with roommate Coffee, he misses his release window due to sedation and becomes trapped in the system. He experiences disturbing visions and a warning that he was "summoned" there. Pepper angrily accosts Dr. Anand demanding his release, leading him to be forcibly drugged and restrained and his stay extended to two weeks. "Louie", an officer who brought Pepper in, begins questioning the hospital's practices, and while looking for a way out of the facility he encounters what seems to be a ghostly apparition in the form of Dr. Walter, the hospital's deceased founder, who forces him to shoot himself. Pepper suggests to Coffee that they escape using stolen staff keys. The presence of something supernatural lurking within New Hyde becomes apparent.
22	2	"Disturbed"	Karyn Kusama	Victor LaValle	May 14, 2026
Pepper's two-week hold begins. Coffee receives an ominous phone call warning that Pepper must not leave. During visiting hours, Marisol tells Pepper his estranged adult son Anthony came looking for him at their home and she gave him the hospital's address, noting she believes only "family" can secure his release. While Pepper attempts to chase after Marisol as she leaves, he accidentally knocks over resident Loochie's grandmother. Loochie attacks Pepper in response, but Pepper receives overnight restraints as punishment, after which he is haunted by a mysterious entity. Longtime resident Dorry claims there is something supernatural behind a silver door. She reveals that Coffee already has Nurse Josephine's stolen staff keys but uses them only to access cookies rather than escape. Pepper attempts escape using the keys, but is attacked by a bison-headed creature. As Pepper is taken to receive medical attention and the keys are recovered by staff, he realizes the entity wants to keep him trapped and will fight to prevent escape.
23	3	"New York in June"	Emmanuel Osei-Kuffour Jr.	Adria Lang	May 21, 2026
Josephine treats Pepper's injuries, claiming he harmed himself, while he insists on a supernatural explanation. Coffee takes Pepper to the silver door and says the Devil lives behind it. Pepper calls his estranged son Anthony, a social worker, who visits but says he cannot help him get released as he isn't family and doesn't share his last name, asking for money for his mother's cremation and expressing disappointment in Pepper's state before leaving. Dorry and other residents claim the creature that attacked Pepper is a patient controlled by the entity known as "Dr. Walter". Dr. Badger follows a pleading voice into a trap. An entity in the form of the deceased officer "Louie" appears to Pepper, promising to help him escape in exchange for a future favor. For "pizza night," Pepper convinces multiple patients to go off their medication as part of an escape plan. During an outing at a Sal's Pizza restaurant, residents face ableist intolerance from customers. Pepper has a chance to escape on a bus but stays to protect his friends when a fight breaks out. Dr. Anand scolds them for non-compliance and institutes total surveillance. "Louie" stops Pepper from entering the silver door, showing him his bullet wound and visions of dead residents to coerce his cooperation. Pepper vows to Dorry, Coffee, and Loochie that they'll defeat the entity together. Afterward, Dorry secretly opens a hidden passage and crawls into a dark hole.
24	4	"A Number in the System"	Emmanuel Osei-Kuffour Jr.	Vanessa Baden Kelly	May 28, 2026
Dr. Walter summons Dorry and pressures her into compliance, revealing he has long manipulated her. Miss Chris' daughter urges her to leave New Hyde. A review board director threatens to shut down New Hyde following the Sal's incident, and Dr. Anand demands strict compliance from the staff. Josephine brings food to the patients that includes metal forks by accident, which are quickly confiscated, but Pepper secretly pockets one. Dr. Badger goes missing without explanation. Pepper and others debate how to defeat the creature, proposing to tranquilize it with haloperidol, but Dorry suggests making peace instead. Scotch Tape adjusts Pepper's back injury and shares his plan to leave the hospital once his residency is complete. Miss Chris attempts to lead Coffee through the silver door but is stopped by Dr. Anand. Marisol calls Pepper and ends their relationship as she is moving to Orlando. Pepper is lured into a psychic "session" with Dr. Walter, who torments him with visions of him abandoning Anthony as a baby, attempting to psychologically break him. Dr. Walter reveals to Pepper he wants his help escaping New Hyde, with the understanding he will kill everyone if he refuses. Dorry warns this would be catastrophic. Coffee is shot and killed by security after being driven to a breakdown.
25	5	"Vermillion"	Craig William Macneill	Christopher Cantwell	June 4, 2026
Director Cleave of the review board conducts a formal inquiry into Coffee's death, interviewing staff and patients, with all patients claiming they were in their rooms. In flashbacks, Dorry's backstory is revealed: she was committed to New Hyde in the mid-1960s by her husband, and was subjected to medical violence by Dr. Walter and staff, who perform unprompted lobotomies on patients. Miss Chris criticizes the hospital administration for only engaging with New Hyde when problems arise. Dr. Anand announces the unit will be shut down and patients transferred by the end of the week. Anthony returns to the hospital after hearing news of Coffee's death, and Pepper apologizes to him, confesses that he abandoned him as a child, and promises to cover the cost of his mother's cremation. Miss Chris reveals that behind the silver door lies the patient Arnold Visserplein, who arrived in 1965 and committed a murder a year later. She believes he is being controlled by an entity called the "duppy" and vows to trap it before the unit closes. Dorry confronts Dr. Anand, accusing him of being possessed by the entity, leading to a violent altercation that leaves Dr. Anand brutally murdered. After the creature helps loosen her restraints, Dorry subsequently climbs the outer fence of the hospital, and ends her own life. Miss Chris tells Pepper and Loochie she believes them about the supernatural entity, and they form an alliance to stop it.
26	6	"Starry Night"	Craig William Macneill	Victor LaValle & Chikira Bennett	June 11, 2026
In flashbacks, Dr. Walter announces his retirement, but Arnold subsequently murders him as Dorry watches. In retaliation for sabotaging its escape method, the entity previously harbored in Dr. Walter's body threatens Dorry to force Arnold to become its new vessel. In the present, Pepper convinces Miss Chris to give him the keys to the silver door and threatens Arnold, triggering an unstable condition. While trying to treat Arnold, the police officer "Dewey" is killed when he wakes up and snaps her neck. Pepper is dominated by Dr. Walter, who intends to use his body in exchange for sparing his loved ones, but he refuses. The creature arrives and kills multiple people, prompting an evacuation. Scotch Tape breaks out of the window and promises to find help. The entity jumps from Arnold into Anthony before Pepper subdues it. Miss Chris helps Loochie escape and plans to share documents containing "the truth" with the world. Some time later, Pepper is shown outside in contact with Marisol and her daughter Isabel, Loochie, and Anthony. However, it's revealed that Pepper took the entity's deal allowing his body to be used as a vessel, and continues to see constant visions of Dr. Walter.

== Production ==
=== Season 1 ===
After the success of the show The Walking Dead, the American cable TV network AMC planned to create a horror TV series based on the novel The Terror. In March 2016, it was confirmed that AMC ordered 10 episodes of the show, with an expected premiere date in 2018.

David Kajganich and Soo Hugh serve as co-showrunners, while Kajganich penned the adaptation. Ridley Scott, Alexandra Milchan, Scott Lambert, David W. Zucker, and Guymon Casady are executive producers. In September 2016, it was announced that Tobias Menzies was cast as a series lead and the showrunners were seeking an Inuk woman, between the ages of 16 and 30, to play an unspecified 'major character', most likely Lady Silence.

Most of the scenes on the ice were created using CGI. Archaeologist Matthew Betts consulted as historical advisor.

=== Season 2 ===
The second season, titled The Terror: Infamy, and consisting of 10 episodes, is co-created by Max Borenstein and Alexander Woo, who also serves as the showrunner.

Derek Mio plays the lead role of Chester Nakayama, a son of Japanese born immigrants who joins the army. George Takei plays Yamato-san, a former fishing captain and community elder who was imprisoned with his family in two Japanese-American internment camps during WWII. Also cast are Kiki Sukezane as Yuko, a mysterious woman from Chester's past; Shingo Usami as Henry Nakayama, Chester's father; and Naoko Mori as Asako Nakayama, Chester's mother; and Miki Ishikawa as Amy, a Nakayama family friend. Takei also serves in a consulting role to ensure the accuracy of historical events and storytelling. C. Thomas Howell was cast as Retired Major Hallowell Bowen, an official with the War Relocation Authority whose "presence looms over the Japanese-American characters in the story."

Josef Kubota Wladyka directed the first two episodes of the season. Production began on January 14, 2019, in Vancouver.

=== Season 3 ===
In January 2020, it was reported by Deadline Hollywood that AMC president Sarah Barnett had expressed interest in renewing The Terror for a third season and that AMC and Scott Free Productions were discussing plot ideas. In February 2024, AMC announced that the series would be renewed for a third season, subtitled Devil in Silver, consisting of six episodes that would premiere in 2025. The season is based on the novel of the same name by Victor LaValle. Chris Cantwell and LaValle serve as writers and executive producers. Karyn Kusama, also an executive producer, directed the first two episodes. Dan Stevens was cast in the lead role and also serves as an executive producer. The rest of the cast includes Judith Light, CCH Pounder, Chinaza Uche, Hampton Fluker, Aasif Mandvi, John Benjamin Hickey, Stephen Root, Hayward Leach, Michael Aronov, Marin Ireland, and Philip Ettinger.

== Release ==
The first season premiered on AMC in the United States and Canada on March 25, 2018, and concluded on May 21, 2018. It was released worldwide on Amazon Prime Video in every other country where the service is present (except Canada, the UK and some Middle Eastern countries) starting March 26, 2018. Amazon released most of the first season ahead of its broadcast on AMC. In the United Kingdom, The Terror premiered on AMC on April 24, 2018, and BBC Two on March 3, 2021.

== Reception ==
=== Critical response ===
==== Season 1 ====
The first season received positive reviews from critics. On Rotten Tomatoes, the season has a 94% rating based on 69 reviews. The website's critical consensus reads: "A thriller wrapped in a prestige drama package, The Terror makes for gripping, atmospheric supernatural horror." On Metacritic, which uses a weighted average, the season has a score of 76 out of 100, based on 20 critics, indicating "generally favorable reviews".

==== Season 2 ====
The second season also received positive reviews from critics. On Rotten Tomatoes, the season has an 80% rating based on 46 reviews. The website's critical consensus reads: "Real-world and supernatural horrors collide in Infamy, an exceptionally well-crafted ghost story that creeps under the skin and stays there." On Metacritic, the season has a score of 75 out of 100, based on 17 critics, indicating "generally favorable reviews".

==== Season 3 ====
The third season received generally positive reviews from critics. On Rotten Tomatoes, the season has a 95% rating based on 21 reviews. The website's critical consensus reads: "Dan Stevens and a game supporting cast deliver well-rounded performances with nuance and verve in this latest installment of The Terror, which humanely depicts its subject's troubles with mental health and supernatural frights." On Metacritic, the season has a score of 71 out of 100, based on 11 critics, indicating "generally favorable reviews".

=== Ratings ===
Viewership and ratings per season of The Terror
Season	Timeslot (ET)	Episodes	First aired		Last aired		Avg. viewers (millions)	Avg. 18–49 rating
Season	Timeslot (ET)	Episodes	Date	Viewers (millions)	Date	Viewers (millions)	Avg. viewers (millions)	Avg. 18–49 rating
1	Monday 9:00 pm	10	March 25, 2018	3.34	May 21, 2018	0.79	1.22	0.36
2	Monday 9:00 pm	10	August 12, 2019	0.58	October 14, 2019	0.36	0.39	0.08

==== Season 1 ====
Viewership and ratings per episode of The Terror
No.	Title	Air date	Rating (18–49)	Viewers (millions)	DVR (18–49)	DVR viewers (millions)	Total (18–49)	Total viewers (millions)
1	"Go for Broke"	March 25, 2018	1.3	3.34	0.5	1.03	1.8	4.37
2	"Gore"	March 26, 2018	0.4	1.39	0.3	1.12	0.7	2.51
3	"The Ladder"	April 2, 2018	0.3	1.11	0.3	1.07	0.6	2.18
4	"Punished, as a Boy"	April 9, 2018	0.3	1.17	0.3	1.04	0.6	2.22
5	"First Shot a Winner, Lads"	April 16, 2018	0.2	0.91	—N/a	—N/a	—N/a	—N/a
6	"A Mercy"	April 23, 2018	0.2	0.92	0.3	0.86	0.5	1.78
7	"Horrible from Supper"	April 30, 2018	0.2	0.97	—N/a	—N/a	—N/a	—N/a
8	"Terror Camp Clear"	May 7, 2018	0.2	0.86	0.2	0.81	0.4	1.67
9	"The C, the C, the Open C"	May 14, 2018	0.2	0.78	—N/a	—N/a	—N/a	—N/a
10	"We Are Gone"	May 21, 2018	0.2	0.79	0.2	0.75	0.4	1.54

==== Season 2 ====
Viewership and ratings per episode of The Terror
No.	Title	Air date	Rating (18–49)	Viewers (millions)	DVR (18–49)	DVR viewers (millions)	Total (18–49)	Total viewers (millions)
1	"A Sparrow in a Swallow's Nest"	August 12, 2019	0.15	0.58	0.10	0.40	0.25	0.98
2	"All the Demons Are Still in Hell"	August 19, 2019	0.10	0.45	0.08	0.38	0.18	0.83
3	"Gaman"	August 26, 2019	0.07	0.42	0.08	0.40	0.15	0.82
4	"The Weak Are Meat"	September 2, 2019	0.06	0.38	0.06	0.37	0.12	0.74
5	"Shatter Like a Pearl"	September 9, 2019	0.08	0.36	0.07	0.31	0.15	0.67
6	"Taizo"	September 16, 2019	0.07	0.38	0.06	0.31	0.13	0.69
7	"My Perfect World"	September 23, 2019	0.07	0.33	0.07	0.31	0.14	0.64
8	"My Sweet Boy"	September 30, 2019	0.04	0.28	0.03	0.22	0.08	0.50
9	"Come and Get Me"	October 7, 2019	0.09	0.38	—N/a	—N/a	—N/a	—N/a
10	"Into the Afterlife"	October 14, 2019	0.09	0.36	—N/a	—N/a	—N/a	—N/a

=== Awards and nominations ===
Year	Award	Category	Nominee(s)	Result	Ref.
2019	Satellite Awards	Best Television Series – Genre	The Terror	Won	
2019	Satellite Awards	Best Actor – Miniseries or Television Film	Jared Harris	Nominated	
2019	Satellite Awards	Best Supporting Actor – Series, Miniseries or Television Film	Paul Ready	Nominated	
2019	Satellite Awards	Best Supporting Actress – Series, Miniseries or Television Film	Nive Nielsen	Nominated	
2019	Visual Effects Society Awards	Outstanding Visual Effects in a Photoreal Episode	Frank Petzold, Lenka Líkařová, Viktor Muller and Pedro Sabrosa (for "Go for Broke")	Nominated	
2020	Satellite Awards	Best Genre Series	The Terror	Nominated	
2020	Writers Guild of America Awards	Long Form – Original	Max Borenstein, Alessandra DiMona, Shannon Goss, Steven Hanna, Naomi Iizuka, Benjamin Klein, Danielle Roderick, Tony Tost and Alexander Woo	Nominated	
