= Aaron Jeffcoate =

English actor (born 1993)

- Born: Aaron Jeffcoate; July 23, 1993 (age 33); Staffordshire, UK
- Occupation: Actor

Aaron Jeffcoate (born 23 July 1993) is a British actor from Staffordshire, UK, best known for his roles in The Terror, Casualty, Shameless and Doctors. He started his acting career at the age of 12 when he took part in several theatre productions. Since then he has appeared in a number of feature films, shorts films, TV series, commercials and music videos.

== Television ==
| Year | Title | Role | Notes |
|---|---|---|---|
| 2009 | Doctors | Dean | 1 episode |
| 2009 | We Are Klang | Teenage layabout | 1 episode |
| 2010 | Survivors (2008 TV series) | Ben | 1 episode |
| 2011 | Scott & Bailey | Son of nick savage | 1 episode |
| 2012 | Shameless (British TV series) | Gang member | 2 episodes |
| 2012 | Last Tango in Halifax | Young Alan | 1 episode |
| 2015 | Casualty | Joss Pearce | 1 episode |
| 2018 | The Terror | Pvt. William Pilkington | 6 episodes |

=== Films ===
| Year | Title | Role |
|---|---|---|
| 2011 | FunTimes | Nathan |
| 2012 | No More a Coward Than You or I | Eddie |
| 2012 | Demonologically Incorrect | Jeff |
| 2012 | Sometime Around Midnight | The helpful guy |
| 2012 | Breaking Point: Two Friends and an Apocalypse | Jason |
| 2012 | Come Home | Damien |
| 2012 | Malice | Dane Tyler |
| 2013 | Molly Crows | William |
| 2013 | The Devils Breath | Sam |
| 2013 | Its Not Too Late | Joe |
| 2013 | Blood Loyal | William Fletcher |
| 2013 | Five Pillars | Gary |
| 2014 | No One Else | Armus |
| 2014 | Legacy of Thorn | Zach Narvy |
| 2014 | One Night | Jake |
| 2015 | The Singing Bird Will Come | Reece |
| 2016 | Our Father | Private Elder |
