= Tyler Young (actor) =

Actor

- Born: Tyler Matthew Young; December 17, 1998 (age 27); Chicago, Illinois, U.S.
- Education: DePaul University
- Occupation: Actor
- Years active: 2013–present

Tyler Matthew Young (born December 17, 1998) is an American actor, known for his role as Philip Shea in the USA Network drama limited series Eyewitness. He portrayed Connor Bell in the horror film Polaroid (2019).

== Early life ==
Young was born in Chicago, Illinois, and raised in the suburb of Kildeer. He was educated at Stevenson High School in Lincolnshire, Illinois, and graduated from DePaul University with a degree in advertising and public relations. Young studied acting at The Theatre School at DePaul and improvisational theatre at The Second City. He is of Jewish descent.

== Career ==
In 2016, Young was cast in a leading role in USA Network's drama limited series Eyewitness. He portrayed Philip Shea, a gay teenager in the foster care of a small town sheriff (Julianne Nicholson), who witnesses a triple murder. Young has also starred in the Dimension Films horror film Polaroid (2019) as Connor Bell, opposite Kathryn Prescott and Madelaine Petsch.

He has appeared in guest roles on episodes of NBC's Chicago Fire and Fox's Empire, as well the show Code Black and the mini-series When We Rise.

== Filmography ==
=== Film ===
Year	Title	Role	Notes
2014	The Ballad of Ronnie and Clive	Sam	Short film
2014	The Last Hour	Eric	Short film
2018	Small Arms	Ethan	Short film
2019	Polaroid	Connor Bell	
2024	Cycles	Matthew	Short film (Post Production)

=== Television ===
Year	Title	Role	Notes
2013–2014	The Avatars	J.P.	Main role (49 episodes)
2014	Chicago Fire	Jason Lullo	Episode: "Arrest in Transit"
2015	Empire	Shy Fan	Episode: "Die But Once"
2016	Eyewitness	Philip Shea	Main role (10 episodes)
2017	Code Black	Jared	Episode: "Unfinished Business"
2017	When We Rise	Matt	Miniseries
