= Eyewitness (American TV series) =

2016 television series

- Genre: Crime; Thriller; Drama
- Based on: Eyewitness by Jarl Emsell Larsen (Uncredited)
- Developed by: Adi Hasak
- Written by: Jennifer Coté; Adi Hasak; Samir Mehta; Angel Dean Lopez; Kendall McKinnon
- Directed by: Scott Peters; Catherine Hardwicke; Robert Lieberman; Kelly Makin
- Starring: Tyler Young; James Paxton; Julianne Nicholson; Gil Bellows; Warren Christie; Tattiawna Jones
- Composer: Keefus Ciancia
- Country of origin: United States
- Original language: English
- No. of seasons: 1
- No. of episodes: 10

Production
- Executive producers: Jackie de Crinis; Jarl Emsell Larsen; Adi Hasak; Scott Peters; Catherine Hardwicke
- Producer: Steve Solomos
- Production locations: Ontario, Canada
- Cinematography: David Greene
- Editors: James Kilton; Bartholomew Burcham; Doug Hannah
- Camera setup: Single-camera
- Running time: 42 minutes
- Production companies: Adi TV Studios; Universal Cable Productions

Original release
- Network: USA Network
- Release: October 16 – December 18, 2016

Eyewitness is an American crime thriller drama television series that premiered on USA Network on October 16, 2016. An adaptation of the 2014 Norwegian miniseries of the same name, the series stars Tyler Young and James Paxton as two teenage boys who accidentally witness a triple murder. It also stars Julianne Nicholson, Gil Bellows, Warren Christie, and Tattiawna Jones.

== Cast and characters ==
=== Main ===
- Julianne Nicholson as Helen Torrance, a sheriff
- Tyler Young as Philip Shea
- James Paxton as Lukas Waldenbeck
- Gil Bellows as Gabe Caldwell, a veterinarian, and Helen's husband
- Warren Christie as Ryan Kane
- Tattiawna Jones as Kamilah Davis, an FBI agent

=== Recurring ===
- Amanda Brugel as Sita Petronelli, Kamilah's sister
- Aidan Devine as Bo Waldenbeck, Lukas' father
- Rainbow Sun Francks as Burlingame, Kamilah's partner
- Matt Murray as Tony Michaels, a deputy
- Katie Douglas as Bella Milonkovic
- Mercedes Morris as Rose, Lukas' ex-girlfriend
- Carlyn Burchell as Anne Shea, Philip's mother
- Alex Karzis as Mithat Milonkovic
- Adrian Fritsch as Tommy

== Episodes ==
No.	Title	Directed by	Teleplay by	Original release date	US viewers (millions)
1	"Buffalo '07"	Catherine Hardwicke	Adi Hasak	October 16, 2016	0.77
Philip and Lukas, two teenage boys, are making out in an isolated cabin when they are interrupted by the unexpected arrival of a group of men. The boys hide when the men enter the cabin. They see one of the men shoot the others before he turns to kill them. The boys manage to overpower him and escape into the night, hiding all evidence of the encounter and vowing not to tell anyone what happened. Helen Torrance, Philip's foster mother, and the sheriff of Tivoli, New York, goes to investigate the killings and finds that the FBI is already involved. Kamilah Davis, an FBI agent, tells Helen the three bodies are a routine gang killing linked to a drug trafficking crime family. Despite being warned to stay away, an invigorated Helen suspects there is something more going on. She and her deputy Tony begin investigating, starting with the car parked outside the cabin.
2	"Bless the Beast and the Children"	Catherine Hardwicke	Adi Hasak	October 23, 2016	0.63
Philip spots the killer on the bus. Helen investigates the murder at the cabin, but comes into conflict with Kamilah, who is still trying to cover up the FBI's involvement in the murders. Meanwhile, the killer stalks Tommy, a friend of Philip's. The killer recognizes the leather jacket Tommy is wearing and believes that Tommy witnessed the shootings at the cabin; however, the jacket was actually given to Tommy by Philip. Philip and Lukas disagree about what they should do about having witnessed the shooting, especially after Tommy is found murdered and the killer is revealed to be someone close to the investigation.
3	"Bella, Bella, Bella"	Scott Peters	Adi Hasak & Angel Dean Lopez	October 30, 2016	0.56
The search for Bella, a potential witness, by both Helen and FBI agent Ryan Kane, continues as the case becomes more complex. Lukas and Philip head into the city to try to forget about what they saw and visit a gay club. Helen questions Mithat, Bella's drug-dealing father, as to the whereabouts of Bella and discovers a note Bella left for her lover. Helen makes yet another deal with Kamilah, having discovered that Kamilah's sister was responsible for a bomb at Mithat's apartment. Ryan finally catches up with Bella after she uses a stolen credit card. However, Bella's body is later found on the outskirts of Tivoli.
4	"Crème Brulée"	Scott Peters	Adi Hasak & Samir Mehta	November 6, 2016	0.57
Parts of Helen's past are revealed as she tries to find out what happened to Bella. Philip tells his foster father, Gabe, about a particularly traumatic event during his childhood. Ryan tries to warn Helen off both the shooting at the cabin and Bella's murder. Philip confesses to Helen and Gabe that he's gay. Kamilah tries to convince her sister to wear a wire and become an informant in return for witness protection. Lukas and Philip engineer a sex scandal in order to dispel the gay rumours surrounding Lukas. Helen uncovers more evidence of Bella's boyfriend, and Kamilah is arrested after drugs are found in her house.
5	"The Lilies"	Kelly Makin	Angel Dean Lopez & Samir Mehta	November 13, 2016	0.61
Helen and her husband go to Philip's mother's house to take her to a drug rehabilitation facility, but she is not ready. Lukas asks Philip to get him drugs from his mother since he is distraught about the shooting, but Philip refuses. Lukas confesses to Philip that he did not actually have sex with his girlfriend and that he has feelings for Philip. Ryan picks up Kamilah and she tells him her sister planted the drugs in her home. Helen uncovers evidence that supports her view that Bella was murdered and gets an autopsy warrant. Helen tells Ryan about the autopsy and the rape kit. Ryan replaces his DNA in Bella's body with Mithat's DNA. Lukas spends his allowance on fake drugs and Philip helps him get money. Lukas lies to his father and says that he needs to pay for his girlfriend to get an abortion. Despite a court order, Philip's mother goes to see him and meets Lukas. Ryan insists on not letting Helen arrest Mithat for child sex abuse yet. Philip's mother enters drug rehabilitation. Philip tells Helen that Lukas was at the cabin during the shooting and has the gun.
6	"The Yellow Couch"	Kelly Makin	Samir Mehta	November 20, 2016	0.62
7	"They Lied"	Rob Lieberman	Angel Dean Lopez	November 27, 2016	0.61
8	"The Larsons' Dog"	Rob Lieberman	Adi Hasak & Samir Mehta	December 4, 2016	0.64
9	"Savior Unknown"	Scott Peters	Adi Hasak & Jennifer Coté	December 11, 2016	0.64
10	"Mother's Day"	Scott Peters	Adi Hasak & Kendall McKinnon	December 18, 2016	0.74
Helen and the boys now know that Ryan is the killer. The boys flee from a hospital to hide from Ryan. Still searching for the boys, Ryan goes to Philip's mother's rehabilitation facility and kills her. Philip and Lukas wind up in a motel, where they talk and eventually have sex. Philip then uses the motel phone to contact Helen. The boys are told to stay put while Helen tracks down Ryan. Philip, however, receives an urgent text from his mother's phone and goes to find her, not knowing that Ryan had sent the message using Philip's mother's phone. Ryan kidnaps both boys. Ryan calls Helen into an isolated area where he has a gun to Philip's head; Lukas is in the trunk of his car. Ryan lets go of Philip. After an emotional speech by Helen, Ryan points his gun at her. Helen shoots him dead, although it turns out that Ryan's gun was empty. The case is closed. The episode ends happily, with Gabe and Helen stronger than ever. Lukas and Philip go to a party together, and Lukas plans to kiss him in front of everyone.

== Production ==
Principal photography commenced on April 25, 2016 and wrapped on August 8, 2016. The majority of filming took place in Parry Sound, Ontario. Filming also took place in McKellar, Rosseau, Seguin, Magnetawan, and Bracebridge.

On March 1, 2017, USA Network confirmed the series would be canceled because it did not hold as much of the Law & Order: Special Victims Unit audience as the network had hoped.

== Reception ==
=== Critical response ===
Eyewitness received positive to mixed reviews. On review aggregator website Rotten Tomatoes, the series has a 83% rating based on 12 critics. On Metacritic, it has a weighted average score of 58 out of 100, based on 11 critics.

=== Ratings ===
In Nielsen's Live+Same Day ratings, the miniseries attained a 0.17 in the 18-49 demographic and 639,000 total viewers.

=== Awards and nominations ===
Year	Award	Category	Recipient	Result	Ref.
2017	28th GLAAD Media Awards	Outstanding TV Movie or Limited Series	Eyewitness	Won	
