= Polaroid (film) =

2019 American supernatural horror film

- German theatrical release poster
- Directed by: Lars Klevberg
- Screenplay by: Blair Butler
- Based on: Polaroid by Lars Klevberg
- Produced by: Roy Lee; Chris Bender; Michael Mahoney
- Starring: Kathryn Prescott; Samantha Logan; Tyler Young; Javier Botet; Mitch Pileggi
- Cinematography: Pål Ulvik Rokseth
- Edited by: Peter Gvozdas
- Music by: Philip Giffin
- Production companies: Dimension Films; Good Fear Film; Eldorado Film; Vertigo Entertainment
- Distributed by: Vertical Entertainment (United States); Lantern Entertainment (International co-distribution with 13 Films)
- Release dates: January 10, 2019 (Germany); October 11, 2019 (United States)
- Running time: 88 minutes
- Country: United States
- Language: English
- Budget: $8.5 million
- Box office: $1.7 million

Polaroid is a 2019 American supernatural horror film directed by Lars Klevberg, and based on his 2015 short film of the same name. The film follows high schooler Bird Fitcher, who is given a vintage Polaroid camera that holds dark and mysterious secrets. She soon realizes that those who get their picture taken by it meet a tragic death. It stars Kathryn Prescott, Samantha Logan, Tyler Young, and Javier Botet.

Dimension Films announced the film in 2015, with Klevberg set to direct and Blair Butler writing the script. Principal photography began in Halifax, Nova Scotia on March 9, 2017, and was completed in May 2017. The film was set to be released in August 2017, but was rescheduled several times. By October 2018, Lantern Entertainment, which acquired The Weinstein Company/Dimension's assets through its bankruptcy, and 13 Films, an international distribution and finance company, had struck a deal to co-distribute the film internationally. This was also the last film to be produced by Dimension Films, which filed for bankruptcy in 2017 following a series of sexual assault cases against co-founder Harvey Weinstein two years prior to the film's release.

Polaroid was theatrically released in Germany on January 10, 2019, by Wild Bunch, and in the United Kingdom on June 1, 2019. It was released in the United States on September 17, 2019, on VOD and on October 11, 2019, in select theatres, by Vertical Entertainment, before streaming on Netflix. The film received mostly negative reviews from critics, with criticism aimed towards the film's heavy reliance on jump scares and its plot.

== Plot ==
Sarah and her friend Linda are going through a box of her late mother's belongings when they find a Polaroid SX-70 camera. Sarah takes a photo in lingerie on the Polaroid camera for her boyfriend, feeling uneasy. Linda leaves soon after. When she takes a look at the Polaroid, there is a creepy shadow behind her in the photo of her. She gets killed on the same night by an entity.

Shy high school student Bird Fitcher is given an old Polaroid camera by her co-worker Tyler, who got it from a garage sale. The camera has the initials "RJS" carved into it. Bird snaps a picture of Tyler but later notices an odd smudge-like figure on his photo.

Bird attends a costume party with her best friend Kasey and meets her other friends Mina, Mina's boyfriend Devin, Avery, and Bird's high school crush Connor. She uses her Polaroid camera to take the group's picture and Avery later snaps a selfie with it. Meanwhile, Tyler is killed by the entity, and Sheriff Pembroke informs Bird. At home, Bird sees Tyler's photo free from the shadow, which has mysteriously transferred to Avery's photo.

Avery is killed when the entity snaps her neck. When Bird learns about this, she tries to destroy the camera and attempts to warn her friends. Devin attempts to burn the group photo, but when the flames reach Mina in the photo, her arm spontaneously combusts and the flames cannot be extinguished. Kasey's fingers are slightly singed before Bird stomps out the fire and the photograph restores itself. Mina is taken to the hospital to undergo surgery for her arm; Devin and Kasey stay with her while Bird and Connor leave to learn more about the camera. While in the antique store, Bird is attacked by the entity, which behaves like a photograph: following the same rules as photographic development (i.e. it is sensitive to heat). She questions why she was chased too and notices that her reflection is in the photo's background.

Mina is killed at the hospital by the entity. Bird and Connor research and discover that the camera was owned by a photography teacher Roland Joseph Sable from their school years ago. He was accused of torturing four students and killing three of them while taking maniacal photographs. One of the captives escaped and Roland was killed by police. Devin confronts Bird at the diner and accuses her of being responsible for what happened to Mina. He attempts to take a picture of her as a threat. With Connor and Devin both fighting for the camera, Devin is accidentally snapped by the camera and the shadow transfers to his photo. Devin lunges at Bird, Kasey saves Bird by stabbing Devin's photo with a pencil, injuring him in real life. Devin, upset from being stabbed, becomes aggressive and accidentally slaps Sheriff Pembroke. Devin is detained and is later killed in his cell when Roland manifests and attacks him.

Connor, Kasey, and Bird learn Roland's wife is alive and visit her. They meet an elderly lady named Lena Sable, who explains that the camera actually belonged to her daughter Rebecca Jane Sable. Lena explains that Rebecca was "slow," and when gifted with the camera she became very attached to it. As a result, Rebecca was bullied by four classmates, who took the camera and used it to take inappropriate photos of her. She killed herself out of shame, causing her father Roland to abduct and kill her bullies in a fit of rage. Now even in death, Roland roams, looking for the last bully who escaped to kill him. Lena shows the two a picture of the survivor and they search the yearbooks. Bird finds out that the survivor was Sheriff Pembroke. In an attempt to stop the entity from killing them, Connor takes a picture of Pembroke, who reveals that Roland in truth often sexually assaulted Rebecca; Lena's version of the events was merely just to cover her husband's evil deeds. The four students, including him, were Rebecca's friends trying to warn her of her father's actions upon finding her nude pictures in his possession. Fearing the public would find out, Roland abducted them, prompting Rebecca to kill herself out of misplaced guilt.

Shortly after, Roland manifests and ambushes the group, killing Pembroke, and injures Kasey. Connor gets separated; the girls find safety in the school's showers, with Bird turning on the hot water to create heat to ward off Roland. Bird reunites with Connor, and she has an idea that involves retrieving the camera and going somewhere where Roland can "fully develop". Roland manifests and drags Connor away, but Bird takes a picture of herself, prompting him to chase her instead. She leads him into the school's dark room, where he is able to fully develop, but the entity ambushes her. As Roland prepares to kill her, she manages to discreetly retrieve the camera and take a picture of him. Bird immediately crushes the photograph. Roland survives however, and she burns the photograph, disintegrating Roland for good. She later reunites with her friends, and ultimately throws the camera into a river.

== Cast ==
- Kathryn Prescott as Bird Fitcher
- Grace Zabriskie as Lena Sable
- Tyler Young as Connor Bell
- Samantha Logan as Kasey
- Javier Botet as The Entity
- Katie Stevens as Avery
- Madelaine Petsch as Sarah
- Priscilla Quintana as Mina
- Davi Santos as Tyler Drew
- Keenan Tracey as Devin
- Mitch Pileggi as Sheriff Thomas Pembroke
  - Kolton Stevens as young Thomas
- Shauna MacDonald as Mrs. Fitcher, Bird's Mother
- Rhys Bevan John as Roland Joseph Sable
- Emily Power as Rebecca Jane Sable
- Erika Prevost as Linda

== Production ==
Dimension Films spearheaded the feature, an adaptation of the 2015 short film Polaroid, written and directed by Norwegian director Lars Klevberg, who also directed the full length version. Chris Bender, Jake Weiner and Jake Wagner produced with Benderspink, Roy Lee with Vertigo and Petter Onstad Løkke and John Einar Hagen with Eldorado Film, which had produced the short film with Klevberg in Norway.

=== Filming ===
Principal photography began in Halifax, Nova Scotia on March 9, 2017.

== Release ==
The film was originally scheduled to be released on August 25, 2017. It was then pushed back to December 1, 2017, before being moved up to November 22, 2017. It was then pulled from the schedule, with plans to release it in 2018. Vertical Entertainment acquired distribution rights to the film, and released it on September 17, 2019, on VOD and on October 11, 2019, in select theaters. By 2020, the film streamed on Netflix, before being removed from the service in July 2022.

In October 2018, Lantern Entertainment, which acquired The Weinstein Company's assets through its bankruptcy, including Dimension Films content; and 13 Films, an international distribution and finance company, struck a deal to co-distribute Polaroid internationally. The film was theatrically released in Germany on January 10, 2019, by Wild Bunch. The film was released in the United Kingdom on June 1, 2019.

== Critical reception ==
On review aggregator Rotten Tomatoes, the film has 4 reviews all labeled “Rotten”, with an average rating of 2.4/10. The Independent reports that it is considered the "worst horror film ever made".

== See also ==
- Camera Obscura, a 2017 film with a similar premise
- Say Cheese and Die!, a 1992 Goosebumps book, which was adapted into a 1996 television episode, with a similar premise
- A Most Unusual Camera, an episode of The Twilight Zone (1959 TV series) dealing with a similar premise
