= Hampton Fluker =

American actor (born 1990)

- Born: Hampton Sterling Fluker; 1990 or 1991 (age 35–36); Atlanta, Georgia, U.S.
- Education: Boston University College of Fine Arts
- Occupation: Actor
- Years active: 2011–present

Hampton Sterling Fluker (born 1990 or 1991) is an American actor known for his roles on stage and in the television series Shades of Blue as well as in some film productions.

== Career ==
Fluker was born in 1990 or 1991 and grew up in Atlanta, Georgia. In his childhood, Fluker dreamed of playing football and pursuing a career in medicine. However, he fell for acting after watching Denzel Washington in the film Glory, where Washington portrays an African-American soldier serving in an infantry unit during the American Civil War. Impressed by Washington's performance, Fluker told his mother that he would pursue a career in acting.

After finishing high school, Fluker moved to New York City and enrolled at Boston University College of Fine Arts, from where he graduated in 2013. He has taken part in numerous theater plays, which have earned him recognition and awards, including lead roles in The Brother/Sister Plays of Tarell Alvin McCraney and The Skin of Our Teeth, a play by Thornton Wilder presented in 2013 at Boston University Theatre. Fluker was awarded the Elliot Norton Award for his role in McCraney's work. In 2019, he won the Dorothy Loudon Award at the Theatre World Award for his role in All My Sons, a play by Arthur Miller.

Fluker has taken part in television series like Shades of Blue, The Good Wife, Major Crimes, and Blue Bloods. Among his film credits, Fluker has been featured in The Blind Side, Whitney, Patriots Day, and Instant Family. Other high-stakes television productions for Fluker include Chicago Med and the third season of The Terror.

== Personal life ==
Fluker is married to Amber Reauchean Williams and resides in Beacon, New York, after moving there from Brooklyn in 2020. His father was a professor at Boston University and a native of Mississippi who moved to Chicago during the Great Migration.

== Selected roles ==
=== Television ===
Year	Title	Role	Ref.
2014	The Good Wife	Khalil Dade	
2014–2015	Major Crimes	Jamey Perez	
2016–2018	Shades of Blue	Marcus Tufo	
2016	Blue Bloods	Sean Young	
2020–2026	Chicago Med	Michael Goodwin	
2026	The Terror	Scotch Tape	

=== Film ===
Year	Title	Role	Ref.
2009	The Blind Side	David	
2015	Whitney	Steve	
2016	Patriots Day	James Williams	
2018	Instant Family	Kit	

== Awards and nominations ==
Year	Award	Category	Work	Result	Ref.
2012	IRNE Awards	Small Theater: Best Supporting Actor (play)	The Brother/Sister Plays	Won	
2012	Elliot Norton Award	Outstanding Performance by an Actor (Small/Fringe Theater)	The Brother/Sister Plays	Won	
2019	Theatre World Awards	Dorothy Loudon Award	All My Sons	Won	
2019	Drama Desk Awards	Outstanding Actor in a Play	All My Sons	Nominated	
