= List of Shades of Blue episodes =

Shades of Blue is an American crime drama television series created by Adi Hasak and premiered on January 7, 2016. The series is set in New York City and stars Jennifer Lopez as the main character Harlee Santos, a single-mother NYPD Detective, who is forced to work in the FBI's anti-corruption task force, while dealing with her own financial and family problems.

On March 17, 2017, the series was renewed for a third and final season. During the course of the series, 36 episodes of Shades of Blue aired, between January 7, 2016, and August 19, 2018.

== Series overview ==
Season	Episodes	Originally released	
Season	Episodes	First released	Last released
1	13	January 7, 2016	March 31, 2016
2	13	March 5, 2017	May 21, 2017
3	10	June 17, 2018	August 19, 2018

== Episodes ==
=== Season 1 (2016) ===
No. overall	No. in series	Title	Directed by	Written by	Original release date	U.S. viewers (millions)
1	1	"Pilot"	Barry Levinson	Adi Hasak	January 7, 2016	8.55
When rookie Michael is out with Harlee and accidentally shoots a drug dealer, she covers it up. Harlee is also part of Matt's group which keeps the peace between the local gangsters and collects extortion money from them, and uses her share for her daughter Cristina's high school tuition. Matt helps them tie up a loose end on Michael's shooting, so Michael now owes him, too. A meeting with a bookie turns out to be an FBI setup for Harlee, who is now forced to work with Agent Robert Stahl and his anti-corruption task force to avoid jail. Robert sends Harlee on a meeting with Matt wearing a wire, where he angrily confides in her that he knows there is an FBI informant on his team whom she is supposed to help find and kill.
2	2	"Original Sin"	Barry Levinson	Story by : Jack Orman & J. David Shanks; Teleplay by : Jack Orman	January 14, 2016	6.64
Now that Matt knows that there is an FBI informant, Harlee feels too much at risk and stops cooperating with Robert. She demands that he patches his leak first. Matt is injured in a drive-by shooting and puts his team to work to find the shooter. Donnie tells Matt that the FBI would pick an informant with personal secrets, which points him to Harlee. Coincidentally, he is reminded of an old case: Miguel Zepeda, Harlee's abusive ex-boyfriend and Cristina's father whom she framed for murder to protect her daughter. Matt sets up a polygraph interrogation of Harlee which she passes, but he still knows she is the FBI informant from a telltale gesture.
3	3	"False Face, False Heart"	Dan Lerner	Mike Daniels & Wolfe Coleman	January 21, 2016	6.94
Matt tells Harlee that Miguel's case is up for retrial, but he will cover for her. After the FBI establishes that they do not have a leak, they demand results from Harlee or will arrest her. Matt finds out that Harlee was going through his office and decides to kill her to protect himself and his lover Donnie. Meanwhile, Tess moves a dead body out of her backyard and asks her colleagues for help. Harlee solves the case and presents it to Robert but he wants Matt. Harlee is on a dinner date with James to discuss Miguel's case when Robert wires her up for her meeting with Matt. She can convince Matt that she is not the rat. Finally, Harlee finishes up her interrupted date with James at his place.
4	4	"Who Can Tell Me Who I Am"	Dan Lerner	Yahlin Chang & Benjamin Lobato	January 28, 2016	6.49
Michael feels guilty about killing the drug dealer and attends his funeral when his police team picks him up to talk some sense into him. Later, he tries to do right by protecting the wife of another abusive criminal suspect, and Harlee seduces him to work outside the rules. After a random sexual encounter at a bar, Matt crashes his car and ends up in hospital. He apologizes to Harlee and asks her for help. She tells Robert about her job to move a van only after hiding explosives and counting machines that Donnie had put into the van without Matt's knowledge. But eventually, Robert and Molly find the items at Matt's storage unit. Meanwhile, Carlos helps Tess by appeasing the woman she attacked for sleeping with her husband, and they kiss.
5	5	"Equal and Opposite"	Dan Lerner	Tamara Becher-Wilkinson & Julian Oliver Meiojas	February 4, 2016	5.64
Tess arrests a drug dealer with a large supply of heroin owned by drug boss Raul Mendez. Matt refuses to return the drugs to Raul. In revenge, Raul has Matt's car stolen and prominently returned with gay graffiti and porn, as a warning that he knows about his secret, so Matt blackmails Raul to leave the city. Donnie has Marcus and David under surveillance, and finds out from a visit by Robert that the FBI is investigating against the team. Suspicious about Tess, Matt follows her and catches her in bed with Carlos. His suspicions about David turn out to be wrong, too. Harlee is worried that Robert became obsessed with her and she suspects that he bugged her apartment. She has a camera installed at his place and watches him practice his lines for his date, but shuts it off when his date arrives and does not realize that she is a "Harlee" look-a-like escort.
6	6	"Fall of Man"	Dan Lerner	Story by : Marta Gené Camps; Teleplay by : Mike Daniels & Wolfe Coleman	February 11, 2016	5.40
When Matt finds out that David has been sneaking away from duty, he is convinced that David is the FBI rat, while he was really only taking Portuguese lessons. Harlee asks Robert to protect David, so Robert arrests him, but David escapes. Meanwhile, Miguel asked Harlee to find Frank Kovach, who committed the murder that Harlee framed Miguel for. Also, Cristina finds letters from Miguel, so Harlee tells her that he abused her and lies to her that he is not her father. She also makes sure Cristina is not allowed to visit him. The hunt for Frank and David's flight from the FBI brings them together with Matt on a top floor of a construction site. Matt pushes David down and shoots Frank dead, making it look like they fought each other, but David survives his fall.
7	7	"Undiscovered Country"	David Boyd	Story by : Mike Daniels; Teleplay by : Jack Orman & Wolfe Coleman	February 18, 2016	5.29
David is in the hospital in a coma, severely injured. Robert and Molly find that Harlee visited Miguel. Miguel is not cooperative, and neither is Harlee, because she is furious that Robert did not protect David. Robert and Molly begin to investigate about Kovach, and find Maxine, who was a friend of the woman killed by Miguel (or rather by Kovach). After Gail visits the police department, Matt is convinced that David is the informant, but Harlee talks him out of murdering him. When Tufo finds the federal immunity contract at David's house, Matt decides that David cannot survive, and stages a bomb threat at the hospital so that he can finish David off.
8	8	"Good Cop Bad Cop"	David Boyd	Story by : J. David Shanks; Teleplay by : Nikki Toscano	February 25, 2016	4.98
Cristina's boyfriend Manny is beat up by abusive and racist street cops. Instead of asking Harlee, Cristina asks Matt for help, who takes care of the cops. Harlee learns that Robert found a witness in Miguel's case who Matt has been paying off regularly. When Robert tells James to stay away from Harlee, she confronts Robert about it and confesses to him that Miguel had abused her and she framed him to protect Cristina. Matt's team mourns for David. At first, Harlee refuses to cooperate with Robert because he failed to protect David, but in the end, she tells him that Matt murdered David and offers her help to bring him down.
9	9	"Live Wire Act"	Millicent Shelton	Story by : Tamara Becher-Wilkinson; Teleplay by : Wolfe Coleman & Tamara Becher-Wilkinson	March 3, 2016	4.77
Furious that Matt murdered David, Harlee wants to put him in jail and asks Robert for a wire. She gets involved in a kidnapping that Donnie had secretly arranged as a test. When Matt angrily confronts Donnie about it, Harlee manages to plant her wire so she and Robert learn about Matt and Donnie's affair. Molly helps Miguel who she knows is innocent in jail by arranging a deal with the DA which Miguel accepts and is set free.
10	10	"What Devil Do"	Millicent Shelton	Mike Daniels	March 10, 2016	4.88
Harlee and Wozniak secure more details on the big score and meet Donnie's silent partner, who reveals himself to be a DEA agent. They learn the big score is an armored car heist. Wozniak takes interest in a fellow marine veteran who is suspected of murder under dubious circumstances.
11	11	"The Breach"	Steven DePaul	Wolfe Coleman	March 17, 2016	5.10
On the day of the heist, Harlee realizes she misplaced her trust in Stahl but it is too late to back down. Harlee tries to get immunity for her crew as she participates in the heist knowing that it will lead to Wozniak's arrest. Miguel discovers Harlee's secret. Loman unwittingly witnesses the heist just as the exchange goes terribly wrong.
12	12	"For I Have Sinned"	Steven DePaul	Mike Daniels	March 24, 2016	5.13
Harlee and Wozniak must face the consequences of the disappearance of the heist's money. Out of options, Harlee approaches the FBI and promises to find the money and deliver Wozniak and his partners if Stahl keeps her in play.
13	13	"One Last Lie"	Paul McCrane	Jack Orman	March 31, 2016	5.43
Unable to provide the FBI with Linklater, who fled the country, and Donnie, who was killed in self-defense by Loman while searching Wozniak's house for the heist money, Harlee makes a deal with Stahl to exchange her own immunity for that of her crew. Wozniak later reveals that he knows Harlee is the mole and that he forgives her; he also reveals that he made his own deal with the FBI in exchange for his crew, including Harlee, receiving immunity, although Harlee proposes to him an alternative idea which is not disclosed to the viewer. Harlee sends her daughter to live with her aunt in New Jersey and faces Miguel's demands to be a part of Cristina's life and his wish to not only keep the money Harlee gave him to leave them alone but also to get his old life back and punish Harlee and Cristina for spending 10 years incarcerated. Miguel attempts to rape Harlee but she takes advantage of his lowered guard and snaps his neck in self-defense, killing him.

=== Season 2 (2017) ===
No. overall	No. in series	Title	Directed by	Written by	Original release date	U.S. viewers (millions)
14	1	"Unforgiven"	Thomas Carter	Jack Orman & Wolfe Coleman	March 5, 2017	5.25
After killing Miguel, Harlee wraps his body in a shower curtain and later uses the grave of her former crew member, Sapperstein, to bury the body while also recovering the stolen heist money she used to bribe Miguel into leaving.
15	2	"Eye of the Hurricane"	Christopher Misiano	Nick Thiel & Jessica Grasl	March 12, 2017	4.84
When Wozniak calls Harlee to meet over dinner, she thinks he has forgiven her for being the informant but instead he states that he needed someone to translate rat to FBI agent Stahl, because he refuses to turn over his old friend Mayoral Candidate Julia Ayers. Later, Harlee pursues a case against a judge after suspecting him of corruption from the mob and a stranger infiltrates the precinct.
16	3	"Ghost Hunt"	Christopher Misiano	Niceole R. Levy & Rashad Raisani	March 19, 2017	4.09
Harlee aids Wozniak and develops a plan to catch Linklater, the man who was behind the armored car heist, and succeeds until Linklater is murdered in cold-blood by agent Stahl. Stahl informs Harlee and Wozniak that Julia Ayers was the reason that his partner was killed while undercover. Loman, who is still dealing with the murder of Donnie Pomp, becomes suspicious when an internal affairs officer named Verco starts an investigation into his disappearance.
17	4	"Daddy's Girl"	Paul McCrane	Michael C. Martin & Marta Gené Camps	March 26, 2017	4.36
As Harlee and Wozniak dispose of Linklater's body in the crematorium, Harlee realizes that she cannot dissuade Stahl from his vendetta against Julia Ayers. A drug case causes Wozniak to deal with his inner demons while also gaining closure for the death of his daughter.
18	5	"Sweet Caroline"	Paul McCrane	Wolfe Coleman & Jessica Grasl	April 2, 2017	4.12
While investigating a murder in the park, Harlee recognizes the victim as Caroline, the ex-fiancée of her boyfriend, Nava, and is horrified to realize that she is being framed by the mafia when a bullet on the scene is a match to the bullets used in her gun. Harlee swipes the bullet from the crime scene and asks Wozniak to replace the bullet until she can recover the gun. Later, Christina is surprised to learn that Miguel is fighting for custody of her, after Stahl poses as a lawyer for family court in order to find out the truth.
19	6	"Fracture"	Peter Weller	Niceole R. Levi & Jessica Grasl	April 9, 2017	3.98
Harlee and Wozniak must race to find the gun used in Caroline's murder after Bianchi threatens the lives of more people if they continue to refuse to give him the name of the person who told them to frame him. Tensions arise between Harlee and Nava after his brief interrogation outside the courthouse, and a break in the case leads Tess and Harlee to the apartment of the murderer, who was hired by Bianchi to not only kill Caroline but, upon later inspection, was hired to kill Nava. Fortunately, he was intercepted by Harlee, which leads to a reconciliation with Nava. Wozniak becomes suspicious of the crew when he notices Tufo chatting with Verco and Loman suspects Wozniak of being the rat when he follows him to the docks and sees him chatting with Stahl.
20	7	"A House Divided"	Peter Weller	Wolfe Coleman & Marta Gené Camps	April 16, 2017	4.05
In the crew's hiding place, Harlee confesses to them that she was the informant for the FBI. This causes the crew to turn their backs on her and Wozniak. With the crew's trust and bond in mind, Harlee and Wozniak agree to meet Bianchi in the woods with an envelope of cash in order to bribe him into leaving. Bianchi, however, has other plans and agrees to meet at the docks in exchange for Julia Ayers. The FBI follows Harlee and Wozniak to the docks but retreats when Wozniak sends a text message to Julia Ayers telling her not to show up. At the precinct, Tufo and Esapada have a heart to heart with Wozniak as each express dissatisfaction with having been lied to and wishes to leave the crew. On public television, Julia Ayers is rescued by Harlee after almost being assassinated.
21	8	"Unpaid Debts"	Jim McKay	Rashad Raisani & Nick Thiel	April 23, 2017	4.13
Fed up with Wozniak's games, Stahl targets the crew by arresting Espada after he agrees to collect weapons to help Tufo's brother. After turning in his badge to Wozniak, Tufo looks towards the crew with assistance in helping to pay off his brother's debt to a drug dealer by hot wiring a car to transport weapons. At the precinct, Wozniak's son, Nate, shows up to write an article on the crew, but after interviewing Loman discovers the truth about his father's dirty dealings, as well as his relationship with Donnie Pomp. Wanting to put a stop to Stahl's harassment of her, Harlee comes face to face with Stahl's ex wife, who reveals the history between Stahl and his partner.
22	9	"Chaos Is Come Again"	Jim McKay	Wolfe Coleman	April 30, 2017	4.53
At the precinct Loman is approached off the books about a missing child named Adrian, from a woman involved in Quince's drug crew. He decides to involve Tufo and Wozniak, who think it is a set up. Stahl continues in his search for Miguel after pushing a reluctant Christina for answers. After discovering text messages from Miguel on Christina's phone, Harlee decides to contact her old ally Caddy, but after no response goes to his apartment. There she discovers that he has apparently died from an overdose, which leads her to an emotional breakdown where she confides in Wozniak that she murdered Miguel. Adrian, the missing child, is located in a park with a bag full of drugs, which leads to a drug bust at a local diner. Tensions boil over with Stahl after a confrontation with Harlee leads Stahl to almost uncover the truth about Miguel. At Wozniak's house things take a turn for the worse when a shootout occurs and Wozniak's son, Nate, is shot.
23	10	"Whoever Fights Monsters"	Felix Enriquez Alcala	Rashad Raisani & Niceole R. Levy	May 7, 2017	4.09
As Wozniak's son, Nate, fights for his life after being shot, Wozniak vows to find the people responsible. As Stahl continues his search for evidence on Miguel's disappearance he uncovers a tooth at Detective Sapperstein's burial plot. At the precinct, Verco ambushes the crew as they search for evidence. Harlee, Tess and Espada track down evidence that leads them to discovering the bodies of the people responsible for the shooting at Wozniak's house.
24	11	"The Quality Of Mercy"	Felix Enriquez Alcala	Jessica Grasl & Marta Gene Camps	May 14, 2017	4.64
Harlee and Wozniak, along with Tufo and Espada, work to gather the ledger files from Bianchis safe with an arrest warrant. Meanwhile, Stahl goes to extreme lengths to obtain a hair sample from Christina in order to match DNA from a tooth that was recovered in the cemetery.
25	12	"Behind The Mask"	Steven DePaul	Wolfe Colman & Michael C. Martin	May 21, 2017	3.78
Harlee must cover for Nava after his brutal encounter with Bianchi leaves the mobster with a broken neck. Later, Harlee confides to Nava that she killed Miguel. A murder in the park leads to a bust on Quince's drug warehouses. Stahl eavesdrops on a conversation between Wozniak and Harlee via Harlee's hacked home WiFi router and learns where Wozniak dumped Miguel's body.
26	13	"Broken Dolls"	Steven DePaul	Story by : Marta Gene Camps & Niceole R. Levy; Teleplay by : Jessica Grasl & Jack Orman	May 21, 2017	4.10
An anonymous tip by Stahl leads Verco on the hunt for Miguel's killer, leaving Harlee and Wozniak rattled. Meanwhile, Nate uncovers audio recordings between Bianchi and Julia Ayers which reveal a betrayal. An encounter between Julia and Wozniak turns fatal just as Julia is elected mayor. Things take a tragic turn after a botched framing results in Stahl kidnapping Harlee, and Wozniak is shot.

=== Season 3 (2018) ===
No. overall	No. in series	Title	Directed by	Written by	Original release date	U.S. viewers (millions)
27	1	"Good Police"	John Behring	Jack Orman & Marta Gené Camps	June 17, 2018	3.52
After their near death experiences, Harlee and Wozniak try to piece their lives back together but danger seems to lurk and old enemies resurface. Later, while entrusting Nava with a suspect on the run from the New York Intelligence Unit Harlee thinks she sees Stahl on a subway but is wrong and in an apparent drive-by shooting, Nava is killed.
28	2	"The Hollow Crown"	John Behring	Wolfe Coleman & Matthew V. Lewis	June 24, 2018	3.10
While dealing with the loss of Nava, Harlee pursues evidence of a higher level of corruption within the NYPD which leads her to the crime scene at a local diner. Harlee meets Cole, a detective who works for Police Captain Ramsey of The New York Higher Intelligence Unit. Harlee suspects that Cole know more about the diner shoot-out then she does so she agrees to help him if he can help her find Nava's killer. Wozniak tries to protect Harlee and his crew from escalating threats.
29	3	"That Way Madness Lies"	Leslie Libman	Erika L. Johnson & Katie Gruel	July 1, 2018	3.50
Harlee gives the eulogy at James Nava's funeral. A doctor tells Wozniak he needs a high-risk surgery to remove the bullet lodged near his spine or he is risking paralysis. Adrian, the boy who shot Wozniak has been beaten up in juvenile detention because Quince is dead. Adrian is more worried about his Mom, Karen, who missed his visit. When Harlee lets Gina stay at their home because she is terrified of Stahl, Gina ends up telling Cristina that Stahl had kidnapped Harlee, information Cristina did not know. When Nate alludes to knowing Wozniak's secrets, Woz accosts Loman, asking what he has told Nate about him, but Loman hedges his answers, not admitting he showed Nate the intimate photos of Woz and Donnie Pomp. After Gina leaves, Harlee thinks she sees Stahl outside her house in the dark. She chases him but then stops, insisting to herself that she has had enough. Little does she know, this time it was really Stahl.
30	4	"A Walking Shadow"	Leslie Libman	Vincent Angell & Nikhil S. Jayaram	July 8, 2018	2.90
In a flashback to Stahl finding Harlee bleeding on the lawn, he calls 911, grabs his things, sets the house on fire and runs. Stahl later ditches the car, steals a motorcycle and grabs a passport, gun, and cash he has hidden, but before he leaves town he makes sure Harlee is alive at the hospital. Stahl makes Gina call the FBI and say she believes Harlee is obsessed with Stahl and plans to kill him. After being beaten in the alley, Wozniak has visions of his late daughter, Annie, until Harlee finds him and cleans him up. Nate's source is Molina's priest so Wozniak finds him and threatens him. Harlee and Loman follow the Intelligence Unit officers and try to disrupt their work. Wallace tells Tufo that working with Wozniak makes him feel like he has a purpose. He feels like Superman, so Tufo lets him go ahead with the operation. Over Wallace phone, they can hear that the meet is actually an ambush.
31	5	"The Blue Wall"	Steve Shill	Marta Gené Camps	July 15, 2018	3.23
Harlee begins to have a panic attack at the hospital while waiting with Loman as Wallace, who has a bad head injury from the ambush, is in hospital care. The Intelligence unit pulls over and arrests Cristina when they find pills on her. Cristina calls Wozniak. Later, Cristina admits to Harlee that she failed her finals while Harlee was in the hospital. She confesses she has been taking Adderall for the last few months and that she is afraid that if she stops, her grades will drop. Wozniak, Tess, and Loman torture Diana, a woman hired to kill Loman by the domestic abuser, who turns out to be Enrique Ortiz, son of Sebastian Ortiz, a cartel kingpin. Harlee follows Bennet and then breaks into his apartment, where she finds Nava's notebook. Harlee asks Cole if Bennett was ordered to kill Nava, but he says he thinks Bennet improvised. Stahl continues to watch Harlee and notices someone else is also watching her too. He dispatches the man with a knife. Harlee plans to arrest Bennet for Nava's murder but as they are surrounded by other cops, Wozniak talks her down. Harlee arrests Bennet for murder and when he resists, Wozniak punches him in front of everyone.
32	6	"The Reckoning"	Steve Shill	Story by : Wolfe Coleman & Ariel Hall; Teleplay by : Wolfe Coleman	July 22, 2018	3.10
Nava's notebook has disappeared from Bennett's residence by the time a search warrant arrives. Although their captain wants to release Bennett, Detective Verco from Internal Affairs agrees to hold him for 24 hours to give Harlee and Wozniak time to gather evidence. Harlee goes to Gina's apartment but Gina does not open the door because Stahl has her tied and gagged. Stahl later kills Gina with a knife and then plants it in Harlee's car. Cole calls Harlee to investigate the office of lawyer Dustin Hayward which is now a crime scene, and they find a note on the back of his family's photo, leading them to a document for an LLC called Magnolia Limited. Cole says that Magnolia was Ramsay's last operation overseas and that it did not go well. Wozniak and the team head to the warehouse in Red Hook in hopes of busting Ramsay's operation, but it is a setup and they come under fire. When they call for backup, police cars approach the scene but then turn away. Tess is in one of them as a passenger, stuck riding on patrol that day, and when she realizes what is happening, she pulls her gun and commandeers the vehicle to return to the shoot-out.
33	7	"Straight Through The Heart"	David Boyd	Story by : Marta Gené Camps; Teleplay by : Marta Gené Camps & Matthew V. Lewis	July 29, 2018	2.98
Tess comes to the rescue of her team, but she is alone. The Intelligence Unit members spray down cover fire and get away. Tess never sees their faces. Later, Internal Affairs officers arrive as the only back up that did not abandon the team. At the warehouse, they find cocaine being shipped in fake apples but Ramsay has doctored the paperwork to make it look like the warehouse and Magnolia Corporation are Wozniak's and not his. When Wozniak questions Bennett he lets it slip that Ramsay has an informant in Internal Affairs. Harlee gets the call that Gina Romero has been found dead in her apartment but the detectives on the case will not let Harlee anywhere near it. Harlee and Cole find the bloody knife in her car and realizes she is being framed by Stahl. Cole offers to dispose of the knife, but Harlee brings it to the FBI and turns it over to Agent Myers. Cole leads Harlee to Vanessa Ruiz, Enrique's girlfriend who can identify Bennett as a corrupt cop. Bennett is released from custody. Cole is terrified when Ramsay calls him in. Ramsay must realize that only Bennet or Cole could have let Harlee and the team know where to find Vanessa. Harlee convinces Cole not to run, but he convinces her to make it look as though he has been tortured because he believes it is the only way Ramsay will not kill him.
34	8	"Cry Havoc"	David Boyd	Wolfe Coleman & Vincent Angell	August 5, 2018	2.86
Harlee gives Cole injuries and ties him up so that they can trick Ramsay. She hides when Ramsay shows up. Cole reassures Ramsay he kept their secrets but suspects Bennett instead so Ramsay backs up off of Cole so Cole can shoot Bennett while Harlee watches from her hiding spot. Wozniak goes home to find the crew all there. They make plans for what they are going to do to get to Enrique. Harlee offers to drive the decoy car. Harlee gets in the decoy van ready to go when she notices the back door is open. She heads to shut it when Stahl comes out of nowhere and pushes her in the back. He tells her it is time to talk. She tries to get out of the back door by shooting at it but Stahl backs the van up but hits something. Harlee jumps out of the back. Stahl gets out to see what happened. She shoots at him and he takes off. Harlee calls Cole to tell him to get out. He runs for it. They pick him up. Wozniak calls Ramsay and tells him they have what he wants and can make a deal for peace but Ramsey has other plans.
35	9	"Goodnight, Sweet Prince"	Nick Gomez	Wolfe Coleman & Erika L. Johnson	August 12, 2018	3.22
Cole wants to run but Harlee asks him to give her one day to figure out a plan. Cole tells Harlee he agrees to testify against Ramsey. Harlee goes to Verco. She does not give Cole's name because she fears he will be killed but she tells Verco that if he convenes a Commission on Police Corruption, she and a witness will testify. She also asks him to broker a trade with the Feds for a wanted cartel member. Harlee's car is seized as part of the investigation into Gina's murder because Agent Myers passed along the information about Harlee finding the knife in her car. Harlee notices an earpiece on Myers' desk and suspects she has been in contact with Stahl. She and Loman pull the original MTA subway footage to recheck and see that Stahl was following Harlee that night and that someone had doctored a copy of the video. Harlee returns home to find Stahl there. She is unarmed and he has a gun. Cristina comes home and goes straight to her room, appearing not to have seen Stahl. Harlee begs him to leave but he will not. Cristina comes in to give Harlee a hug before she leaves again and turns her so she cannot see Stahl, but Cristina already knows he is there and has Harlee's gun in the side of her jeans. She puts Harlee's hand on it and whispers for her not to hesitate. Harlee turns and shoots Stahl three times. He falls to the floor, bleeding badly but is still alive. As he is slowly dying on the floor, he says he is glad it was her that shot him. Harlee shoots him a fourth time and kills him. Harlee and Cristina go to the same motel for the night where Cole is hiding out. Cristina tells Harlee she did the right thing and none of this was her fault. Harlee disagrees, goes into the bathroom and breaks down in tears.
36	10	"By Virtue Fall"	Nick Gomez	Story by : Ariel Hall & Wolfe Coleman; Teleplay by : Marta Gené Camps & Jack Orman	August 19, 2018	3.21
The morning after gunning down Stahl in her living room, Harlee formally brings her case against Captain Ramsey to the police commission. Harlee assures Wozniak that Cole would be delivering the testimony but Cole is a no-show, and after being found by Harlee, officially backs out of their arrangement before leaving town. After letting Enrique escape, Tess and Wozniak meet with the cartel liaison, who leads Ramsey into saying incriminating things while Wozniak records the conversation. Wozniak sends the evidence to Harlee, as she is about to face Ramsey and the counsel by herself. The hearing reconvenes, and Harlee is left to lay out the accusations against Captain Ramsey herself while also incriminating herself. As a result, Ramsey is arrested and his assets are frozen as the department investigates the Intelligence unit. Later, Harlee reveals to Wozniak that she has decided to take a plea deal in regards to her corrupt actions. Even though he warns her that she'll lose her badge and will never be able to work as a cop again on top of going to prison, Harlee has accepted this, citing the one thing Stahl was right about: the only way to conquer her demons is to face them, and that only then can she truly be the good woman and mother she has desired so long to be. She tearfully urges Wozniak and her team to look after Cristina while she is incarcerated, and the two embrace. Sometime afterward, as Ramsey is being transferred to Rikers, Wozniak pulls some strings to infiltrate the transport and strangles the corrupt captain to death in revenge for forcing Harlee to bring him down by incriminating herself. Two months later, after getting her affairs in order, Harlee allows Wozniak to escort her to prison to begin her three-year sentence. Cristina moves in with the Wozniaks and settles into their late daughter's room; she later finds a letter from her mother explaining her actions. At the 64th, the team celebrates as Tess and Tufo are restored to Detective status, but Loman misses Harlee's presence. As Harlee is processed into prison and gets settled into her cell, an expression of peace comes over her face.

== Ratings ==
=== Season 1 (2016) ===
Viewership and ratings per episode of List of Shades of Blue episodes
No.	Title	Air date	Rating/share (18–49)	Viewers (millions)	DVR (18–49)	DVR viewers (millions)	Total (18–49)	Total viewers (millions)
1	"Pilot"	January 7, 2016	1.8/6	8.55	1.3	4.92	3.1	13.46
2	"Original Sin"	January 14, 2016	1.3/4	6.64	1.3	4.67	2.6	11.31
3	"False Face, False Heart"	January 21, 2016	1.4/5	6.94	1.2	4.53	2.6	11.47
4	"Who Can Tell Me Who I Am"	January 28, 2016	1.3/4	6.49	1.0	3.62	2.3	10.11
5	"Equal and Opposite"	February 4, 2016	1.1/4	5.64	1.2	4.31	2.3	9.95
6	"Fall of Man"	February 11, 2016	1.1/4	5.40	1.1	3.98	2.2	9.38
7	"Undiscovered Country"	February 18, 2016	1.1/4	5.29	1.1	4.02	2.2	9.31
8	"Good Cop Bad Cop"	February 25, 2016	1.0/4	4.98	1.1	3.81	2.1	8.77
9	"Live Wire Act"	March 3, 2016	1.0/3	4.77	1.1	3.91	2.1	8.68
10	"What Devil Do"	March 10, 2016	1.0/4	4.86	1.0	3.80	2.0	8.68
11	"The Breach"	March 17, 2016	1.0/4	5.10	0.9	3.62	1.9	8.72
12	"For I Have Sinned"	March 24, 2016	1.0/4	5.13	1.0	3.82	2.0	8.95
13	"One Last Lie"	March 31, 2016	1.1/4	5.43	0.9	3.58	2.0	8.96

=== Season 2 (2017) ===
Viewership and ratings per episode of List of Shades of Blue episodes
No.	Title	Air date	Rating/share (18–49)	Viewers (millions)	DVR (18–49)	DVR viewers (millions)	Total (18–49)	Total viewers (millions)
1	"Unforgiven"	March 5, 2017	1.0/4	5.25	—N/a	—N/a	—N/a	—N/a
2	"Eye of the Hurricane"	March 12, 2017	0.9/3	4.84	0.6	2.57	1.5	7.41
3	"Ghost Hunt"	March 19, 2017	0.8/3	4.09	0.6	2.72	1.4	6.81
4	"Daddy's Girl"	March 26, 2017	0.8/3	4.36	0.7	2.54	1.5	6.90
5	"Sweet Caroline"	April 2, 2017	0.7/3	4.12	0.6	2.67	1.3	6.78
6	"Fracture"	April 9, 2017	0.7/3	3.98	0.6	2.67	1.3	6.65
7	"A House Divided"	April 16, 2017	0.7/3	4.04	0.6	2.75	1.3	6.80
8	"Unpaid Debts"	April 23, 2017	0.7/3	4.13	0.6	2.62	1.3	6.75
9	"Chaos Is Come Again"	April 30, 2017	0.8/3	4.53	—N/a	—N/a	—N/a	—N/a
10	"Whoever Fights Monsters"	May 7, 2017	0.7/3	4.09	0.6	2.56	1.3	6.65
11	"The Quality Of Mercy"	May 14, 2017	0.9/4	4.64	0.6	2.60	1.5	7.25
12	"Behind The Mask"	May 21, 2017	0.7/3	3.78	0.5	2.28	1.2	6.06
13	"Broken Dolls"	May 21, 2017	0.7/3	4.10	0.6	2.50	1.3	6.60

=== Season 3 (2018) ===
Viewership and ratings per episode of List of Shades of Blue episodes
No.	Title	Air date	Rating/share (18–49)	Viewers (millions)	DVR (18–49)	DVR viewers (millions)	Total (18–49)	Total viewers (millions)
1	"Good Police"	June 17, 2018	0.6/3	3.52	0.5	2.41	1.1	5.94
2	"The Hollow Crown"	June 24, 2018	0.5/2	3.10	0.5	2.36	1.0	5.46
3	"That Way Madness Lies"	July 1, 2018	0.5/2	3.50	0.5	2.19	1.0	5.69
4	"A Walking Shadow"	July 8, 2018	0.5/2	2.90	0.4	2.11	0.9	5.01
5	"The Blue Wall"	July 15, 2018	0.5/2	3.23	0.4	2.04	0.9	5.27
6	"The Reckoning"	July 22, 2018	0.4/2	3.10	0.5	2.14	0.9	5.24
7	"Straight Through The Heart"	July 29, 2018	0.5/2	2.98	0.5	2.26	1.0	5.24
8	"Cry Havoc"	August 5, 2018	0.5/2	2.86	0.4	2.00	0.9	4.86
9	"Goodnight, Sweet Prince"	August 12, 2018	0.6/3	3.22	0.4	2.18	1.0	5.40
10	"By Virtue Fall"	August 19, 2018	0.6/3	3.21	0.4	2.04	1.0	5.25
