= Adi Hasak =

American screenwriter and producer

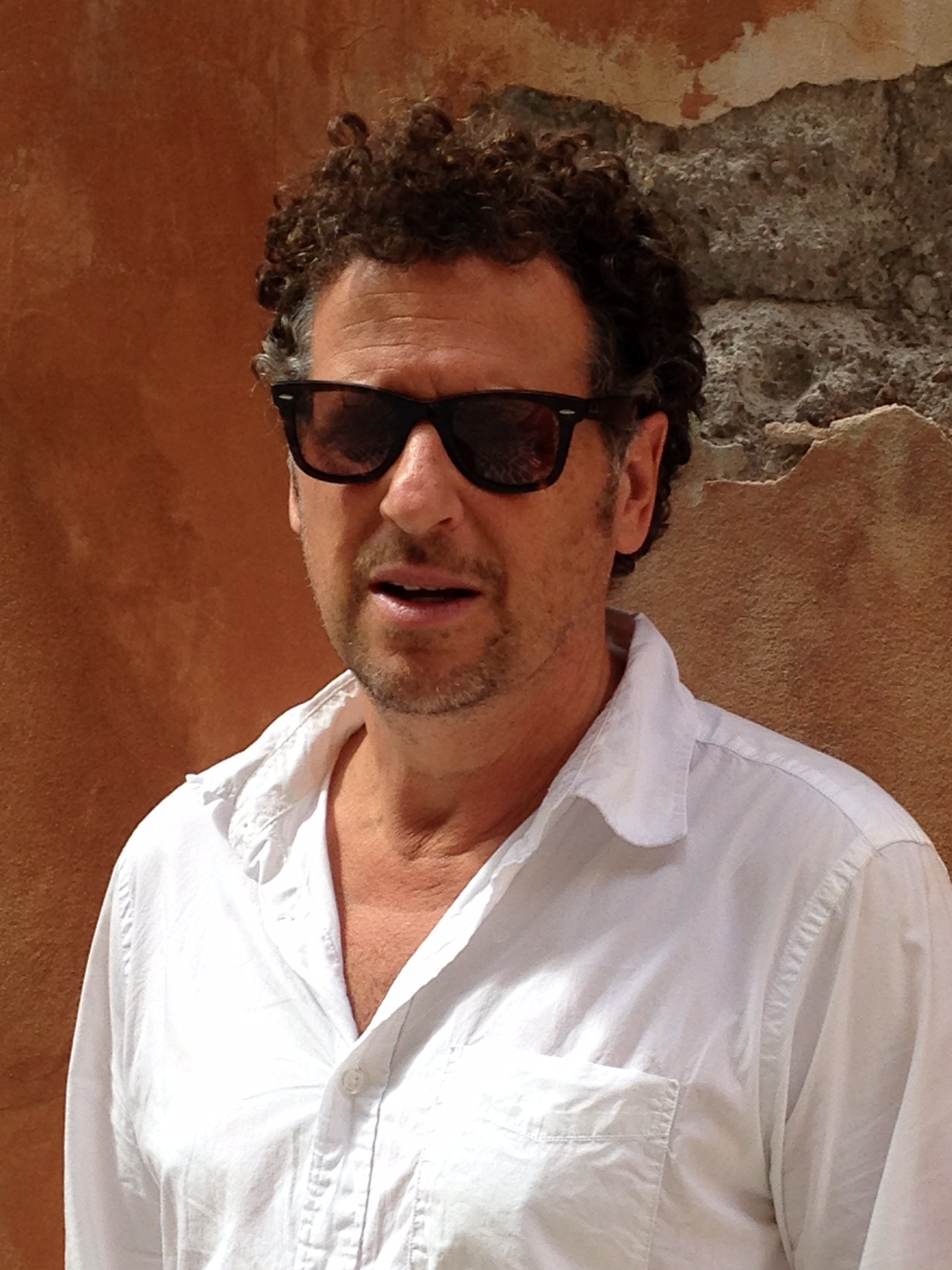
- Adi Hasak in 2014
- Occupations: Screenwriter, producer

Adi Hasak is a screenwriter, producer, and former journalist.

He is the creator of the American crime drama series, Shades of Blue, which stars Jennifer Lopez, Ray Liotta, and Drea de Matteo. The series premiered on January 7, 2016 on NBC.

== Early life ==
Hasak was born in Rotterdam, Netherlands to Israeli parents, Russian Jews from New York. After a stint as a journalist he moved to Los Angeles where he began writing features but eventually transitioned to TV and become a showrunner.

== Career ==
He co-wrote the 1997 film, The Shadow Conspiracy. It was the final film directed by George P. Cosmatos, who died in 2005. Hasak is a frequent collaborator with Luc Besson, and the pair have jointly written and produced two feature films, From Paris With Love, starring John Travolta, and 3 Days To Kill, starring Kevin Costner.

He developed the drama series Eyewitness, which is based on the Norwegian series Øyevitne, for American television. The series premiered on USA Network on October 16, 2016 and lasted for one season.

Hasak developed, wrote and acted as showrunner on The Box, which premiered on Viaplay on 28 November 2021.
