= Shades of Blue (TV series) =

2016 American crime drama television series

- Genre: Crime drama; Action; Mystery; Thriller
- Created by: Adi Hasak
- Based on: Shades of Blue: 30 Years of (Un)ethical Policing by Michael Rudolph
- Starring: Jennifer Lopez; Ray Liotta; Drea de Matteo; Warren Kole; Dayo Okeniyi; Hampton Fluker; Vincent Laresca; Sarah Jeffery; Gino Anthony Pesi
- Composers: Wendy Melvoin; Lisa Coleman
- Country of origin: United States
- Original language: English
- No. of seasons: 3
- No. of episodes: 36 (list of episodes)

Production
- Executive producers: Jennifer Lopez; Ryan Seacrest; Adi Hasak; Barry Levinson; Nina Wass; Jack Orman; Elaine Goldsmith-Thomas; Benny Medina
- Producers: Priscilla Porianda; David DeClerque
- Production locations: New York City, US
- Cinematography: Stefan Czapsky
- Editors: Aaron Yanes; Joel Goodman; Elba Sanchez-Short
- Camera setup: Single-camera
- Running time: 42 minutes
- Production companies: Nuyorican Productions; EGTV Productions; Ryan Seacrest Productions; Jack Orman Productions; Adi TV Studios; Universal Television

Original release
- Network: NBC
- Release: January 7, 2016 – August 19, 2018

Shades of Blue is an American crime drama television series created by Adi Hasak for NBC. The series premiered on January 7, 2016. It is set in New York City and stars Jennifer Lopez as Harlee Santos, a single-mother NYPD Detective who is forced to work for the FBI's Anti-Corruption Task Force, while dealing with her own financial and family problems.

The series is loosely based on the novel Shades of Blue: 30 Years of (Un)ethical Policing by Michael Rudolph.

In March 2017, the series was renewed for a third season. NBC later announced in April 2018 that this would be the final season, and that it would consist of 10 episodes. The third and final season premiered on June 17, 2018, and the series finale aired on August 19, 2018.

== Cast and characters ==
=== Main ===
- Jennifer Lopez as Harlee Santos, a corrupt NYPD Detective with the Street Crimes detective squad in the NYPD's 64th Precinct and an FBI informant for the FBI's Anti-Corruption Task Force. She is a single mother to 16-year-old Cristina; Cristina's father was abusive, and shortly after his release from prison in 2005, Harlee framed him for murder. She joined Wozniak's crew after he helped cover up her frame job. After getting arrested by the FBI in an anti-corruption investigation, she becomes a reluctant informant against Wozniak in exchange for immunity. She eventually sacrifices her career and freedom to bring down the corrupt Intelligence Unit, and is sent to prison for three years.
- Ray Liotta as Lieutenant Matt Wozniak, a corrupt NYPD Lieutenant who is the commander of the 64th Precinct's Street Crimes detective squad and the main target in an FBI anti-corruption investigation. He is a 25-year veteran of the force, and before that spent six years in the United States Marine Corps. He is very close to Harlee, whom he considers a daughter, and Harlee's own daughter, Cristina; this stems from the guilt he feels over the death of his own daughter Anna-Kate, from a drug overdose at age 19. After Harlee sacrifices her career and freedom to bring down the corrupt Intelligence Unit, Wozniak drives her to prison and takes in Cristina per her wishes.
- Drea de Matteo as Detective Tess Nazario, an NYPD Detective in Wozniak's crew who wrestles with her personal life, most notably her marriage, which eventually ends during the series. She is reassigned to patrol as an officer in season 3 due to the fallout of the events of the previous season's finale but is promoted back to detective in the series finale.
- Warren Kole as Special Agent Robert Stahl, an FBI Special Agent assigned to the Anti-Corruption Task Force, and Harlee's handler. He develops an obsession with Harlee which, after crossing multiple lines, leads to his indefinite suspension and eventual termination from the Bureau. Stahl then goes rogue and after temporarily kidnapping Harlee, becomes obsessed with trying to bring her down by any means necessary, even by killing those allied with him and attempting to frame her. Near the end of the series, he corners Harlee inside her home, only for her to shoot and finally kill him with Cristina's help.
- Dayo Okeniyi as Detective Michael Loman, a rookie NYPD Detective assigned to the 64th, who initially struggles to stay straight amongst the corrupt actions of his co-workers but embraces the dirty cop lifestyle by the end of the series.
- Hampton Fluker as Detective Marcus Tufo, an NYPD Detective who fancies himself as a ladies' man, and often has to deal with his brother's shortcomings. He is reassigned to patrol as an officer in season 3 due to the fallout of the events of the previous season's finale but is promoted back to detective in the series finale.
- Vincent Laresca as Detective Carlos Espada, an NYPD Detective who operates as the muscle of Wozniak's squad. He and Tess have a brief affair during season 1, which is then followed by much sexual tension between them for the rest of the series.
- Sarah Jeffery as Cristina Santos, Harlee's 16-year-old daughter and a musical prodigy. She is often kept in the dark regarding her mother's corrupt activities, but soon comes to know and accept her as a good person. At the end of the series, after Harlee is sent to prison, she moves in with the Wozniaks, settling into their late daughter's old room and reading a letter left by her mother.
- Gino Anthony Pesi as James Nava (seasons 2–3; recurring season 1), the Assistant District Attorney assigned to monitor the 64th Precinct and who becomes romantically involved with Harlee. He is murdered at the start of season 3 by the corrupt Intelligence Unit detectives after being entrusted with a suspect running from them, who is killed along with him.

=== Recurring ===
- Leslie Silva as Gail Baker, an FBI special agent in charge, and an old friend of Harlee's, who assigns her as the mole under Stahl's supervision.
- Santino Fontana as David Saperstein (season 1), a detective who is part of Wozniak's crew. Wozniak kills him after being led to believe that he is the FBI's mole.
- Michael Esper as Donnie Pomp (season 1), a corrupt lieutenant in Internal Affairs who uses his position to protect Wozniak and his crew. He is later killed by Loman in self-defense and his body is cremated by Wozniak.
- Lolita Davidovich (season 1) and Margaret Colin (seasons 2–3) as Linda Wozniak, Matt's wife
- Annie Chang as Molly Chen (seasons 1–2), an FBI special agent and Stahl's partner. She later has herself reassigned after becoming very uncomfortable with Stahl's growing obsession with Harlee.
- Mark Deklin as Joe Nazario (season 1), Tess' husband, who eventually becomes divorced from her.
- Erica Ash as Erica (season 1), Loman's love interest
- Kathryn Kates as David's mother (season 1)
- Stephen Lang as Terrence Linklater (seasons 1–2), a corrupt DEA agent in league with Wozniak and Pomp to pull off an armored car heist, only to betray the team and steal most of the money before fleeing the country. He later returns and is captured by Harlee and Wozniak, who aim to use him as a bargaining chip to get out from under the FBI's thumb. However, Stahl instead prevents this by murdering Linklater in cold blood and his body is cremated by Harlee and Wozniak.
- Antonio Jaramillo as Miguel Zepeda (season 1), Harlee's violently abusive ex-boyfriend and Cristina's father. Wozniak and Harlee conspired to frame him for murder in order to keep Harlee and Cristina safe. He is later released and tries to reconnect with his daughter but is repeatedly stalled by Harlee's attempts to keep Cristina away from him. Harlee eventually kills him in self-defense after he attempts to rape her at gunpoint. His disappearance becomes a focus point in season 2 as Stahl attempts to uncover the truth behind it.
- Vanessa Vander Pluym as Gina Rodriguez (seasons 2–3), a prostitute that Stahl frequents due to her resemblance to Harlee (Pluym is also Jennifer Lopez's stunt double for the show). Gina was killed by Stahl in an attempt to bring down Harlee.
- Dov Davidoff as Tom Verco (seasons 2–3), a detective serving as an Internal Affairs investigator, who gradually becomes a reluctant ally of Wozniak and his crew.
- Cameron Scoggins as Nate Wozniak (seasons 2–3), Matt and Linda's son, and the brother of Anna Kate. He beat up the drug dealer who sold Anna Kate the drugs she overdosed on and left him for dead, and would have ended up in jail had Julia Ayres not covered it up.
- Anna Gunn as Julia Ayres (season 2), a New York City councilwoman and mayoral candidate. She was a member of Wozniak's crew prior to her promotion to NYPD Captain. During season 2, she becomes the subject of an FBI investigation led by Stahl. She later commits suicide after a fallout between her and Wozniak threatens to put all of her misdeeds out in the open, just as she is elected Mayor of New York City.
- Karsen Liotta as Anna Kate Wozniak (season 3), Matt and Linda's daughter. Karsen Liotta, the real-life daughter of Ray Liotta, plays his character's deceased daughter Anna Kate, who Matt sees visions of in season 3.
- Afton Williamson as Katie Myers (season 3), an FBI special agent assigned to search for Stahl after he becomes a fugitive, but is later revealed to be allied with him, due to Stahl having saved her life when the two were in Quantico. Stahl later kills her after their attempted frame job against Harlee comes apart and she refuses to help him again after discovering he'd been keeping certain secrets from her.
- Bruce McGill as Jordan Ramsey (season 3), the corrupt captain who heads the NYPD's Intelligence Unit. As of the most powerful men in the department, he is not afraid to flex his muscle at anyone whom he sees as a threat to his plans. In the series finale, after his corrupt activities are exposed by Harlee, who sacrifices everything to bring them to light, Ramsey is arrested, his assets are frozen and he is killed by an enraged Wozniak.
- Nick Wechsler as Anthony Cole (season 3), a lieutenant in the Intelligence Unit who turns against them after they orchestrate the death of his partner. Although he at first works with the 64th detectives to bring them down, he soon discovers how ruthless his corrupt colleagues are and leaves town during the series finale.
- Victor Turpin as Enrique Ortiz (season 3), the spoiled son of a dangerous, powerful and wealthy Colombian drug lord. His family have minions in the police department, who make sure he gets liberated after being arrested by Santos.

== Episodes ==
Season	Episodes	Originally released	
Season	Episodes	First released	Last released
1	13	January 7, 2016	March 31, 2016
2	13	March 5, 2017	May 21, 2017
3	10	June 17, 2018	August 19, 2018

== Production ==
In February 2014, NBC gave a 13-episode straight-to-series order. A teaser trailer was made available on June 3, 2015, containing statements by Lopez, Ray Liotta, and Drea de Matteo. The series premiered on January 7, 2016. On February 5, 2016, NBC renewed Shades of Blue for a 13-episode second season, which premiered on March 5, 2017. On March 17, 2017, the series was renewed for a third season. NBC later announced on April 4, 2018, that this would be the final season, and it would contain 10 episodes. The third season premiered on June 17, 2018.

=== Casting ===
Lopez was given the main role in 2014. On February 26, 2015, Liotta, de Matteo, Vincent Laresca and Warren Kole were cast as Lt. Matt Wozniak, Det. Shirley Nazario, Det. Tony Espada and Agent Robert Stahl, respectively. Dayo Okeniyi was given the role of Det. Michael Loman. On March 30, 2015, Hampton Fluker was cast in a recurring role as Det. Marcus Tufo. On April 8, Sarah Jeffery was cast as Santos' daughter, Christina. On April 13, 2015, Gino Anthony Pesi was cast in a recurring role as Assistant District Attorney James Nava. On June 15, 2016, Anna Gunn joined Shades of Blue's second season in a recurring role.

=== Filming ===
Filming for the first season began on June 5, 2015, for the second season in July 2016, and for the third season in April 2017.

All filming took place in New York City.

== Themes ==
Character Harlee Santos is an NYPD detective who is a single mother. She is corrupt, taking bribes and protection money so that she can provide for her daughter. When confronted, she is forced by the FBI to go undercover and investigate her own squad. In their book, Reel Latinxs: Representation in U.S. Film and TV, academics Frederick Luis Aldama and Christopher González suggest that Santos is depicted as duplicitous and traitorous. They argue that the show follows a Latina-as-mamá stereotype. Conversely, Willa Paskin, writing for Slate magazine, argues that Santos is presented too sympathetically and generously: she is "down-to-earth and competent, flipping from flirtatious to distressed, maternal to infuriated."

== Reception ==
=== Ratings ===
Season	Time slot (ET/PT)	Episodes	Season premiere		Season finale		TV season	Rank	Viewers (in millions)
Season	Time slot (ET/PT)	Episodes	Date	Viewers (in millions)	Date	Viewers (in millions)	TV season	Rank	Viewers (in millions)
1	Thursday 10:00 pm	13	January 7, 2016	8.55	March 31, 2016	5.43	2015–16	#35	9.87
2	Sunday 10:00 pm	13	March 5, 2017	5.25	May 21, 2017	4.10	2016–17	#58	6.74
3	Sunday 10:00 pm	10	June 17, 2018	3.52	August 19, 2018	3.21	2017–18		

=== Critical response ===
The show has received mixed reviews despite praise for Lopez's performance. On Metacritic, Shades of Blue has a score of 58 out of 100, based on 28 critics. On Rotten Tomatoes, the show is rated 57% based on 42 reviews, with an average rating of 5.8/10. The site's consensus reads "Solid performances by Jennifer Lopez and Ray Liotta fail to lift Shades of Blue above the ranks of the pedestrian network procedural".

Writing for USA Today, Robert Bianco gave the series two stars out of four, calling it "a thoroughly ordinary reworking of pretty much every crooked cop show and movie you've ever seen". Slate reviewer Willa Paskin criticized the show as "moderately terrible", though praised Lopez's performance as "hugely appealing" and called her "the show's one reliable pleasure". In a more positive review, Yahoo!'s Ken Tucker called Lopez's work "solid" and felt the series was "perhaps the best dramatic work she's done since her first-rate film, Out of Sight". Molly Eichel from The A.V. Club gave the series a C+ rating, saying that "While the plot starts out cut and dried, it becomes more twisty and turny in a way that will eventually bring the audience back to the opening scene of a makeup-less, de-glammed Santos confessing her sins into a camera". Matt Zoller Seitz of Vulture wrote that "Shades of Blue isn't a deep show, but it's a sensationally effective one. It knows what it is (a compacted, melodramatic, commercial TV-friendly gloss on one of those '70s and '80s Sidney Lumet police-corruption thrillers) and it rarely steps wrong."

=== Awards and nominations ===
Year	Award	Category	Nominee(s)	Result	Ref.
2016	Imagen Foundation Awards	Best Actress – Television	Jennifer Lopez	Nominated	
2016	Imagen Foundation Awards	Best Primetime Television Program – Drama	Shades of Blue	Nominated	
2016	Teen Choice Awards	Choice TV Actress: Drama	Jennifer Lopez	Nominated	
2016	Teen Choice Awards	Choice TV Drama	Shades of Blue	Nominated	
2017	Imagen Foundation Awards	Best Actress – Television	Jennifer Lopez	Nominated	
2017	Imagen Foundation Awards	Best Primetime Television Program – Drama	Shades of Blue	Nominated	
2017	Nigeria Entertainment Awards	Lead Role (Diaspora TV)	Dayo Okeniyi	Nominated	
2017	People's Choice Award	Best Crime Drama Actress	Jennifer Lopez	Won	
2018	Imagen Foundation Awards	Best Actress – Television	Jennifer Lopez	Nominated	
2018	Imagen Foundation Awards	Best Primetime Television Program – Drama	Shades of Blue	Nominated	

== Broadcast ==
In India, Shades of Blue premiered on Colors Infinity on January 8, 2016, and aired shortly after its U.S. counterpart. In Canada, Shades aired on Global, at the same time and day as it aired on NBC. In the Netherlands, Shades was aired on Wednesdays on Fox. In Latin America, the series premiered on April 7, 2016 on Universal Channel. In Australia, it premiered on the Universal Channel on August 2, 2016. In the United Kingdom, Shades of Blue premiered on Sky Living on July 13, 2016. In Italy, it premiered on pay-platform Mediaset Premium on September 22, 2016 and then aired as a free broadcast on Canale 5 from July 5, 2017. In Bulgaria, the series premiered on October 3, 2016, on Fox Crime. In Germany, it premiered on RTL on October 18, 2016. In France, it premiered on March 13, 2017 on France 2. In Greece, the series premiered on September 3, 2018, on Makedonia TV.
