= 3rd Irish Film & Television Awards =

Annual Irish film and television awards ceremony

- Date: 5 November 2005
- Site: Royal Dublin Society
- Hosted by: James Nesbitt

Highlights
- Best Film: Pavee Lackeen
- Best Actor: Liam Neeson; Kinsey
- Best Actress: Renee Weldon; Trouble With Sex
- Most awards: Pure Mule (5)
- Most nominations: Pure Mule (8); Short Order (8); Trouble With Sex (8)

The 3rd Annual Irish Film & Television Awards was hosted by James Nesbitt on 5 November 2005 at the Royal Dublin Society, Dublin, honouring Irish film and television released in 2005.

== Awards in film ==
Best Film

- Pavee Lackeen (Winner)
  - Mickybo and Me
  - The Mighty Celt
  - Tara Road
  - Trouble With Sex

Best Short Fiction Award

- Martin McDonagh for Six Shooter (Winner)
  - Rory Bresnihan & John Butler for George
  - Ronan Burke and Rob Burke for Jellybaby
  - Ken Wardrop for Ouch

Best Animation Award Winner

- Cúilín Dualach (Winner)
  - Agricultural Report
  - Dick Terrapin
  - Not There Yet

Best Director

- Terry George for Hotel Rwanda (Winner)
  - Anthony Byrne for Short Order
  - Fintan Connolly for Trouble With Sex
  - Perry Ogden for Pavee Lackeen

Best Cinematography

- Seamus Deasy for The Mighty Celt (Winner)
  - Brendan Galvin for The Flight of the Phoenix
  - Seamus McGarvey for Sahara
  - Owen McPolin for Trouble With Sex

Best Music

- Gregory Magee for Winter's End (Winner)
  - Niall Byrne for Short Order
  - Niall Byrne for Trouble With Sex
  - Fiachra Trench for The Boys & Girl From County Clare

Best Script

- Anthony Byrne for Short Order (Winner)
  - Pearse Elliott for The Mighty Celt
  - Terry George for Hotel Rwanda
  - Terry Loane for Mickybo and Me

Best Production Design

- Eleanor Wood & Laura Bowe for Short Order (Winner)
  - Laurent Mellet for Trouble With Sex
  - Tom McCullagh for Mickybo and Me
  - Anna Rackard for Boy Eats Girl

Best Costume Design

- Hazel Webb-Crozier for Mickybo and Me (Winner)
  - Susan Scott for Boy Eats Girl
  - Marian Smyth for Trouble With Sex
  - Judith Williams for Short Order

== Awards across TV and film ==
Best Documentary in the English Language

- John McGahern: A Private World (Winner)
  - Macintyre's Underworld: Gangsters
  - Haughey
  - My Name Is Paul

Best Documentary in the Irish Language

- Concerto – Do Chaitlín Maude (Winner)
  - An Bathadh Mór
  - Cosc Ar Ghnéas
  - Iran: An Bealach In Airde

Best Editing in Film / TV Drama

- Emer Reynolds for Shameless (Winner)
  - J. Patrick Duffner for Short Order
  - Ray Roantree for Trouble With Sex
  - Ben Yates for Love Is the Drug

Best Sound in Film / TV Drama Award Winner

- Philippe Faujas, Niall Brady & Ken Galvin for Pure Mule (Winner)
  - Patrick Drummond, Tom Johnson, John Fitzgerald & Stuart Bruce for Boy Eats Girl
  - Ray Cross, Nikki Moss, John Fitzgerald John Fitzgerald & Peter Blayney for Short Order
  - Karl Merre, Nicky Moss & Ken Galvinfod for Showbands

== Awards in television ==
Best TV Drama / Drama Series

- Love Is the Drug (Winner)
  - Murphy's Law
  - Pure Mule
  - Showbands

Best Current Affairs Programme

- Prime Time Investigates: "Home Truths" (Winner)
  - Prime Time Investigates: "The Money Pit"
  - Insight: "When Hospitals Kill"
  - Spotlight: "Dirty Secrets"

Best News Programme

- BBC Newsline (Winner)
  - Nuacht TG4
  - RTÉ News
  - Sky News Ireland

Best Children's / Youth Programme

- PicMe (Winner)
  - GFI: Go For It
  - The Island of Inis Cool
  - What's The Story?

Best Entertainment Award Winner

- Stew (Winner)
  - Killinaskully
  - The Panel
  - Wild Trials

Best Lifestyle Programme

- Show Me The Money (Winner)
  - Neelo: "KKK"
  - Mother Knows Best
  - The Snip

Best Sports Feature

- Marooned (Winner)
  - Coach
  - The Crossing
  - Final Words: Hurling '04

Best Director TV Drama / Drama Series

- Declan Recks for Pure Mule (Winner)
  - Aisling Walsh for Fingersmith
  - Charlie McCarthy for Pure Mule
  - Dearbhla Walsh for Shameless

== Awards in acting ==
Best Actor in Leading Role – Film

- Liam Neeson for Kinsey (Winner)
  - Gabriel Byrne for Wah-Wah
  - Cillian Murphy for Red Eye
  - Aidan Quinn for Convicted

Best Actress in a Leading Role – Film

- Renee Weldon for Trouble With Sex (Winner)
  - Andrea Corr for The Boys & Girl From County Clare
  - Jillian Bradbury for Winter's End
  - Winnie Maughan for Pavee Lackeen
  - Renee Weldon for Trouble With Sex

Best Actor in a Supporting Role – Film

- David Kelly for Charlie and the Chocolate Factory (Winner)
  - Seán McGinley for On a Clear Day
  - Cillian Murphy for Batman Begins
  - Tagdh Murphy for Boy Eats Girl

Best Actress in a Supporting Role – Film

- Charlotte Bradley for The Boys & Girl From County Clare (Winner)
  - Nora Jane Noone for The Descent
  - Deirdre O'Kane for Boy Eats Girl
  - Tatiana Ouliankina for Short Order

Best Actor – Television

- Tom Murphy for Pure Mule (Winner)
  - Allen Leech for Love Is the Drug
  - Finbar Lynch for Proof 2
  - James Nesbitt for Murphy's Law

Best Actress – Television

- Dawn Bradfield for Pure Mule (Winner)
  - Elaine Cassidy for Fingersmith
  - Anne Marie Duff for Shameless
  - Aisling O'Sullivan for The Clinic

Best Actor in a Supporting Role – Television

- Garrett Lombard for Pure Mule (Winner)
  - Gary Lydon for The Clinic
  - John Lynch for The Baby War
  - Chris O'Dowd for The Clinic

Best Actress in a Supporting Role – Television

- Eileen Walsh for Pure Mule (Winner)
  - Eva Birthistle for The Baby War
  - Tine Kellegher for Showbands
  - Eleanor Methevan for Love Is the Drug

== People's Choice Awards ==
O_{2} TV Personality of the Year

- Mark Cagney (Winner)
  - Aoife Ní Thuairisg
  - Stephen Nolan
  - Gráinne Seoige
  - Pat Shortt

AIB Best Irish Film

- Inside I'm Dancing (Winner)
  - Adam & Paul
  - Headrush
  - Mickybo and Me

Jameson Best International Film

- Charlie and the Chocolate Factory (Winner)
  - Batman Begins
  - Crash
  - Sin City

Avica Best International Actor

- Mickey Rourke for Sin City (Winner)
  - Christian Bale for Batman Begins
  - Johnny Depp for Charlie and the Chocolate Factory
  - Brad Pitt for Mr. & Mrs. Smith

Pantene Best International Actress

- Gillian Anderson for The Mighty Celt (Winner)
  - Drew Barrymore for The Perfect Catch
  - Dakota Fanning for War of the Worlds
  - Natalie Portman for Garden State

== Lifetime achievement award ==
- Awarded to David Kelly
