= Susan Fitzgerald =

Irish actress

Susan FitzGerald
- Born: Susan Mary Theresa FitzGerald; 28 May 1949; Leicester, England
- Died: 9 September 2013 (aged 64); Dublin, Ireland
- Education: Trinity College
- Occupations: Stage and television actress
- Spouse: Michael Colgan (divorced 2010)
- Children: 3
- Relatives: Geraldine Fitzgerald (aunt); Tara Fitzgerald (cousin); Jennifer Johnston (cousin)

Susan Mary Theresa FitzGerald (28 May 1949 – 9 September 2013) was an English-born Irish actress, best known for her work in television and her work in Irish theatre. She also played the role of May in Samuel Beckett's Footfalls for the Gate Theatre's Beckett on Film project. At her death she was hailed as "one of Ireland's best known stage actresses" and "the pre-eminent stage actress of her generation and beloved of theatre audiences."

== Biography ==
Born in Leicester, England, she was the eldest of six children born to William FitzGerald, a GP, and his wife, Emily Irwin; her parents moved to Leicester from Dublin during the Second World War. She was educated at Evington Hall convent school in Leicester; her family moved back to Kinsale, in County Cork, in 1966.

FitzGerald met Michael Colgan, later a prominent director, soon after entering Trinity College in 1968, where she read English, philosophy and history. They married while they were active with the Trinity Players and later had three children: Sarah, Sophie, and Richard. FitzGerald and Colgan divorced in 2010 after a long separation, but they remained on good terms.

== Career ==
Starting in the 1970s, FitzGerald played leading roles in productions, by both Irish and non-Irish European writers, at the Gate Theatre. She was particularly known for having played May in Footfalls in the Gate's Beckett Festival in New York and London, and for having filmed Footfalls for the Beckett on Film project. She also worked for the Abbey Theatre, in plays such as Six Characters in Search of an Author, A Midsummer Night's Dream and Hedda Gabler.

More recently at the Gate, she appeared as Lady Bracknell in The Importance of Being Earnest, as Mrs. Bennett in Pride and Prejudice (she reprised the role in the Spoleto Festival in Charleston), in Jane Eyre (directed by Alan Stanford), in The Eccentricities of a Nightingale (directed by Dominic Cooke), and in Martin Crimp's adaptation of The Misanthrope, as well as in Pygmalion and in The Constant Wife. She appeared in a variety of other projects in Ireland, including various plays at the Olympia Theatre.

Her television work included numerous appearances in Fair City, Rebel Heart, Bachelor's Walk, Proof and The Big Bow Wow. She appeared in such feature films as Trouble With Sex, Satellites and Meteorites and Happy Ever Afters.

== Death ==
FitzGerald died, aged 64, from cancer, which had been diagnosed in 2005.

== Selected filmography ==
=== Film ===
- Happy Ever Afters – Mrs. Maguire
- Satellites & Meteorites – Angela Gore
- Trouble with Sex – Rosie
- Footfalls (short) – May
- Angela's Ashes – Sister Rita
- The Serpent's Kiss – Mistress Clevely
- A Portrait of the Artist as a Young Man (1977) – Emma

=== Television ===
- The Big Bow Wow – Patricia
- Proof – Beatrice Cosgrove
- The Irish R.M. – Miss Longmuir
