= Circus World =

Circus World may refer to:

- Circus World (TV series), an Irish children's television series which premiered in 2016
- Circus World (novel), a 1981 science-fiction novel by Barry B. Longyear
- Circus World (film), a 1964 film starring John Wayne and Rita Hayworth
- Circus World (store), a now-defunct chain of toy stores in the United States
- Circus World (theme park), a defunct theme park in Florida
- Circus World Museum
- Circus World (1974 film), a film directed by Roman Kroitor
