= All Aboard =

All Aboard may refer to:

== Music ==
- All Aboard! (John Denver album), 1997
- All Aboard (musical), 1913 Broadway musical by E. Ray Goetz, Malvin M. Franklin, and Mark Swan
- All Aboard (Side Effect album), 1982
- All Aboard: A Tribute to Johnny Cash, tribute album to Johnny Cash, 2008
- All Aboard, an unreleased album by Locomotiv GT
- "All Aboard" (Romeo Santos song), 2012
- "All Aboard", a song by Bassjackers vs D'Angello & Francis, 2017
- "All Aboard", a song by the Lucky Monkeys, 1990

== Other uses ==
- All Aboard (TV series), an Irish children's television series which premiered in 2018
- All Aboard (1917 film), a 1917 comedy short starring Harold Lloyd
- All Aboard (1927 film), a 1927 film starring Johnny Hines
- All Aboard! Rosie's Family Cruise, a 2006 American documentary film
- All Aboard! 20th Century American Trains, a United States Postal Service stamp set
- Brightline, United States Train operator previously known as All Aboard Florida
- All Aboard, the slogan for Eurovision Song Contest 2018

== See also ==
- All a Bir-r-r-rd, a 1949 Looney Tunes cartoon
