= On the Couch =

On the Couch may refer to:

- On the Couch, book by Lorraine Bracco
- On the Couch (Irish TV series)
- On the Couch (Australian TV series)
- "On the Couch", a song by Supersuckers from La Mano Cornuda, 1994
- "On the Couch", a song by Prince from Musicology, 2004
