= Fintan Connolly =

Irish film director and screenwriter

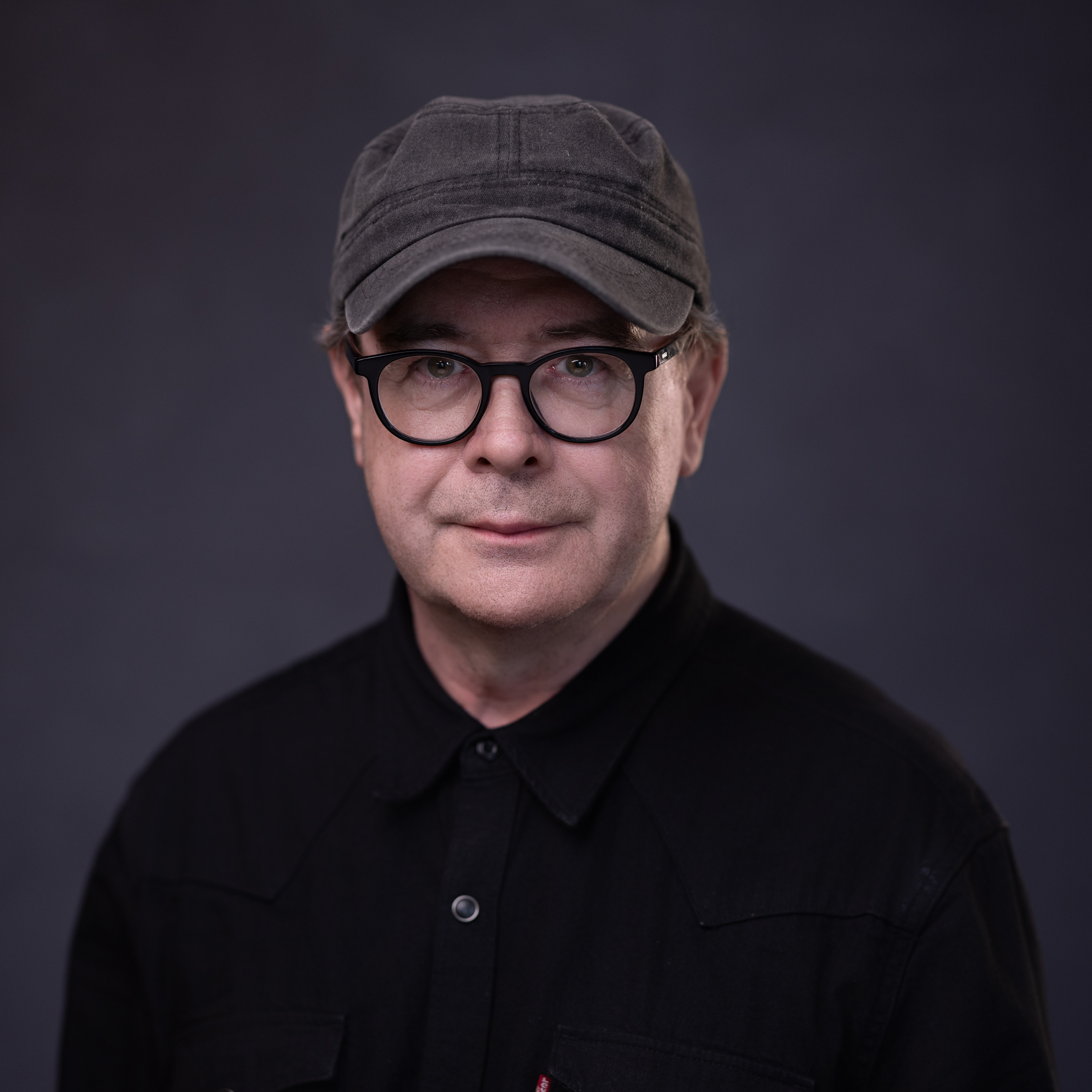
Fintan Connolly Irish filmmaker SDGI AGM 2026

Fintan Connolly is an Irish film director, screenwriter and producer living in Dublin. Much of his earlier work was in television documentaries which explored social issues in Ireland. He has also made films, including Flick (2000), Trouble with Sex (2005), Eliot & Me (2012) and Barber (2023) through his production company Fubar Films.

== Career ==
Connolly directed the short film Angel on the Rocks in 1985. He co-produced, with Helen Fahy, the short movie Horse (1993) directed by Kevin Liddy. This film won an award for "Best European Short" at the Premiers Plan Festival in Angers, France in 1994. Working with co-director Hilary Dully, he worked on several television documentaries for RTÉ, Channel 4 and TG4. These include Framed! (1987), No Comment (1988), ...and finally France (1988), For Better Or Worse (1989), No Comment II (1991), Notice To Quit (1992, rights of older tenants), 50,000 Secret Journeys (1994, abortion), and Comely Maidens (1995). As a single director, Connolly directed the documentaries Sisters (1998), Priests (1998), Out of Nowhere (2000, asylum seekers), Ainé's Journey (2000) and Singleton (2002).

Connolly made his feature film directorial debut with Flick in 2000 in conjunction with producer Fiona Bergin. The film starred David Murray, Isabelle Menke, David Wilmot, Gerard Mannix Flynn, Catherine Punch and Alan Devlin. Connolly wrote the film's script and it was shot in 18 days with no budget. Flick had its premiere at the Cork Film Festival in October 1999. A reviewer in the Sunday Independent said "In many ways, Fintan Connolly's first film, Flick is a breath of fresh air. We get to see Dublin on the screen – a very contemporary Dublin, too. It's about time. In Flick, there are no horses in lifts. You won't spot the Chieftains playing trad on Moore Street. This is real Dublin – and what first strikes you about the film is that Flick is a love letter to Connolly's native city."

In 2005, Connolly made Trouble with Sex, starring Aidan Gillen and Renée Weldon, for which he received two Irish Film and Television Awards nominations. The film was premiered at the Dublin International Film Festival in February 2005. Trouble with Sex was the second feature created through a director/producer partnership between Fintan Connolly and Fiona Bergin. Connolly told the Galway Advertiser that "only 20 per cent of directors get to make a second feature, so I've been really lucky".

In 2012, Connolly made Eliot & Me, a children's adventure drama, co-written with Fiona Bergin and featuring his daughter Ella. The movie had its world premiere as the opening film at the Film Festival Zlin in May 2012. He also completed a documentary about Aosdána, an affiliation of Irish artists, called The Art Tribe.

He later made observational documentaries for RTÉ’s children's channel RTÉjr, including Zara World (2014), Circus World (TV series), (2016) and All Aboard (TV series) (2018).

His film Barber, with Aidan Gillen, premiered at the 2023 Dublin International Film Festival.

== Controversy ==
50,000 Secret Journeys, which, along with all Connolly's early documentary work, was co-directed with the documentary filmmaker Hilary Dully, is a film in which three women who had abortions tell their stories intercut with news clips recounting events in a legal struggle between pro and anti abortion campaigners. A decision to pull the film from the RTÉ schedule, on 29 March 1994, provoked strong protest from several film-makers. A statement issued by SIPTU, on behalf of the TV producer/director and director grades, said that it was "a matter of serious concern to TV producers and directors that such a programme should be deemed unsuitable for inclusion in one of RTÉ's main current affairs programmes". An RTÉ spokesperson said the decision had been taken "for internal RTÉ reasons which we don't want to go into". The documentary was ultimately screened on RTÉ on 27 October 1994 and followed by a studio debate on abortion in Ireland chaired by Marian Finucane.

== Recognition ==
Writing on the release of Connolly's debut film, Flick (2000), Ciaran Carty in the Sunday Tribune said "What's exciting about this new crop of directors is that they've broken away from the preoccupation with theory and ideology that for so long bedeviled Irish independent film-making. They're not interested in using movies as part of an argument about the nature of Irish identity: instead they show Irish life as it is – or was – and let the audience make what they like of it. Their movies are movies, not statements or messages". Michael Dwyer, of the Irish Times, described Flick as "a lean, tightly coiled contemporary drama resourcefully achieved on a remarkably low budget". Pete Walsh, programmer at the Irish Film Institute, wrote that "Connolly's impressive first feature makes a welcome addition to the relatively small band of truly independent low-budget Irish films. Written by Connolly himself, and developed with producer Fiona Bergin, the finished work has a genuinely "indie" feel and a strong sense of its makers' commitment to a vision".

The Sunday Times referred to the films Flick and Trouble with Sex as "Irish noir fiction", saying that "Fintan Connolly's movies [..] depict a thoroughly noir-looking Dublin full of moody shadows and drenched in blue light, but there is no corresponding heart of darkness in the plot". Another reviewer said that Trouble With Sex "vacillates between modes of melodrama and avant-gardism, unsure what kind of film it is".

Of Trouble with Sex, Yvonne Hogan in Irish Independent stated that "The ennui of single thirty somethings in the newly wealthy Ireland is a field ripe for cinematic interrogation and Connolly is to be commended for grappling with it".

=== Awards and nominations ===
- 2005, Irish Film and Television Awards nomination for 'Best Director' for Trouble With Sex
- 2005, Irish Film and Television Awards nomination for 'Best Film' for Trouble With Sex

== Selected filmography ==
Year	Title	Role	Notes
1985	Angel on the Rocks	Director, co-writer	20 minutes short film
1993	Horse	Producer	30 minutes short film
2000	Flick (2000 film)	Director, writer	82 minutes crime drama
2000	Country	Associate producer	92 minutes drama
2005	Trouble with Sex	Director, co-writer	89 minutes drama
2012	Eliot & Me	Director, co-writer	60 minutes drama
2023	Barber	Director, co-writer	90 minutes drama
