= Alan Moloney =

Irish film and television producer

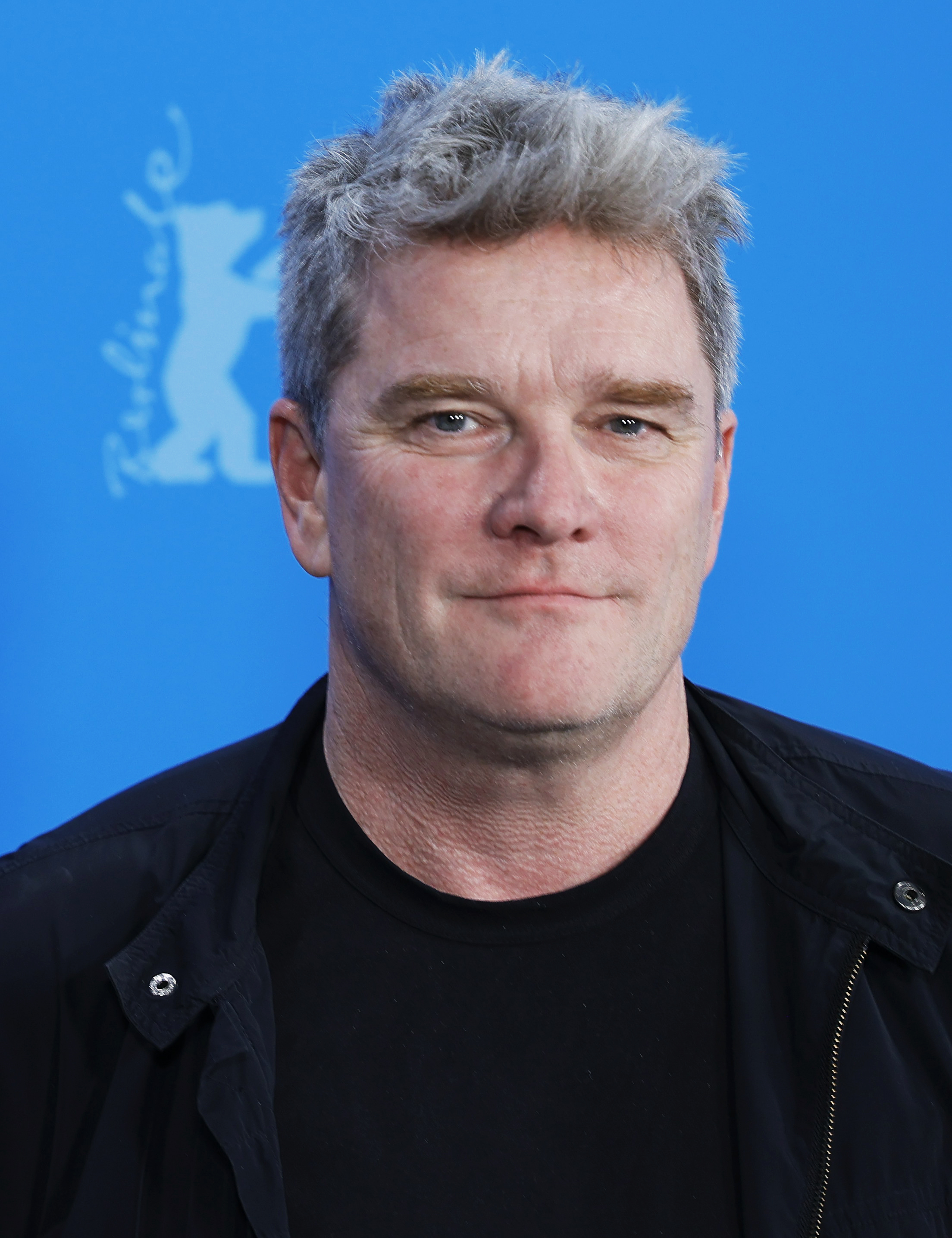
- Moloney at the 2024 Berlinale
- Born: November 1966 (age 59–60)
- Years active: 1993–present

Alan Moloney (born November 1966) is an Irish film and television producer. He established Parallel Film Productions in 1993. He was named a 2005 producer to watch by Variety.

In 2001, alongside Michael Colgan, Moloney produced Beckett on Film, a project aimed at making film versions of all nineteen of Samuel Beckett's stage plays. Ten of the films were screened at the 2000 Toronto International Film Festival and some shown on Channel 4. The series won the Best TV Drama award at the 6th The South Bank Show Award at the Savoy Theatre in London. In 2006, Moloney worked with Harold Pinter to produce a TV adaptation of the stage play Celebration.

In 2007, Moloney produced Joe Strummer: The Future Is Unwritten, directed by Julien Temple. In the same year he also produced The Escapist, which premiered at the Sundance Film Festival. In 2008, he produced A Film with Me in It, and in 2009, Triage and Perrier's Bounty. In 2024, he produced the film Small Things Like These.

Moloney has been responsible for TV dramas in Ireland and the UK including Kingdom and The Clinic.
