= Tatiana Ouliankina =

Russian actress (born 1970)

- Born: 13 May 1970 (age 56); Moscow, Russian SFSR, Soviet Union
- Other name: Tatianna Ouliankina
- Education: Boris Shchukin Theatre Institute
- Occupation: Actress
- Years active: 2000–present
- Spouse: John Moore (m. 2000)
- Children: 2

Tatiana Ouliankina (Russian: Татьяна Ульянкина, romanized: Tatyana Ulyankina; born 1970) is a Russian actress, best known for her work in Irish film and television.

== Filmography ==
- Publication (1988) as Oksana Shevchenko
- Paths to Freedom (TV, 2000) as Natalya Ivanova (3 episodes)
- The Clinic (TV, 2003) as Natalia Riabushkin (6 episodes)
- Proof (2004) as Club Hostess (1 episode)
- Short Order (2005) as Stefani
- Fair City (TV, 2003–07) as Lana Borodin Dowling
- Belonging to Laura (TV film, 2009) as Sascha
- Parked (2010) as Aqua Aerobics Instructor
- A Date for Mad Mary (2016) as Oksana

== Awards ==
Ouliankina has been nominated for two Irish Film & Television Awards: in 2005 as Best Supporting Actress (Film) for Short Order; and in 2010 as Best Supporting Actress (TV) for Belonging to Laura, a TV adaptation of Lady Windermere's Fan.
