= Chartbusters =

Irish video rental chain

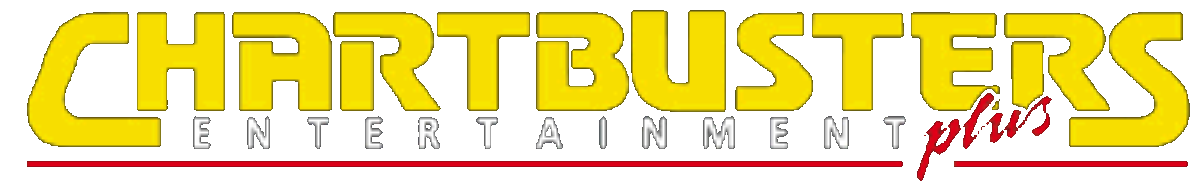
- Logo as of 2004
- Company type: Private limited company
- Industry: Video rental
- Founded: 28 July 1993; 32 years ago
- Founder: Richard Murphy
- Defunct: 15 November 2010
- Fate: Liquidation
- Number of locations: 16 (2010)
- Area served: Ireland

Chartbusters was an Irish video rental chain founded by former Xtra-vision chief executive, Richard Murphy.

== History ==
Chartbusters was founded by Richard Murphy following his departure from Xtra-vision in 1990. His exit contract with the latter included a non-competitive clause that ran until 1994. Chartbusters was registered on 28 July 1993 as Chartbusters Limited. The chain rented out VHS/DVDs and games, and sold VHS/DVDs, computer games, cassettes and books. The first two locations opened in Tallaght and Blanchardstown.

=== Stores ===
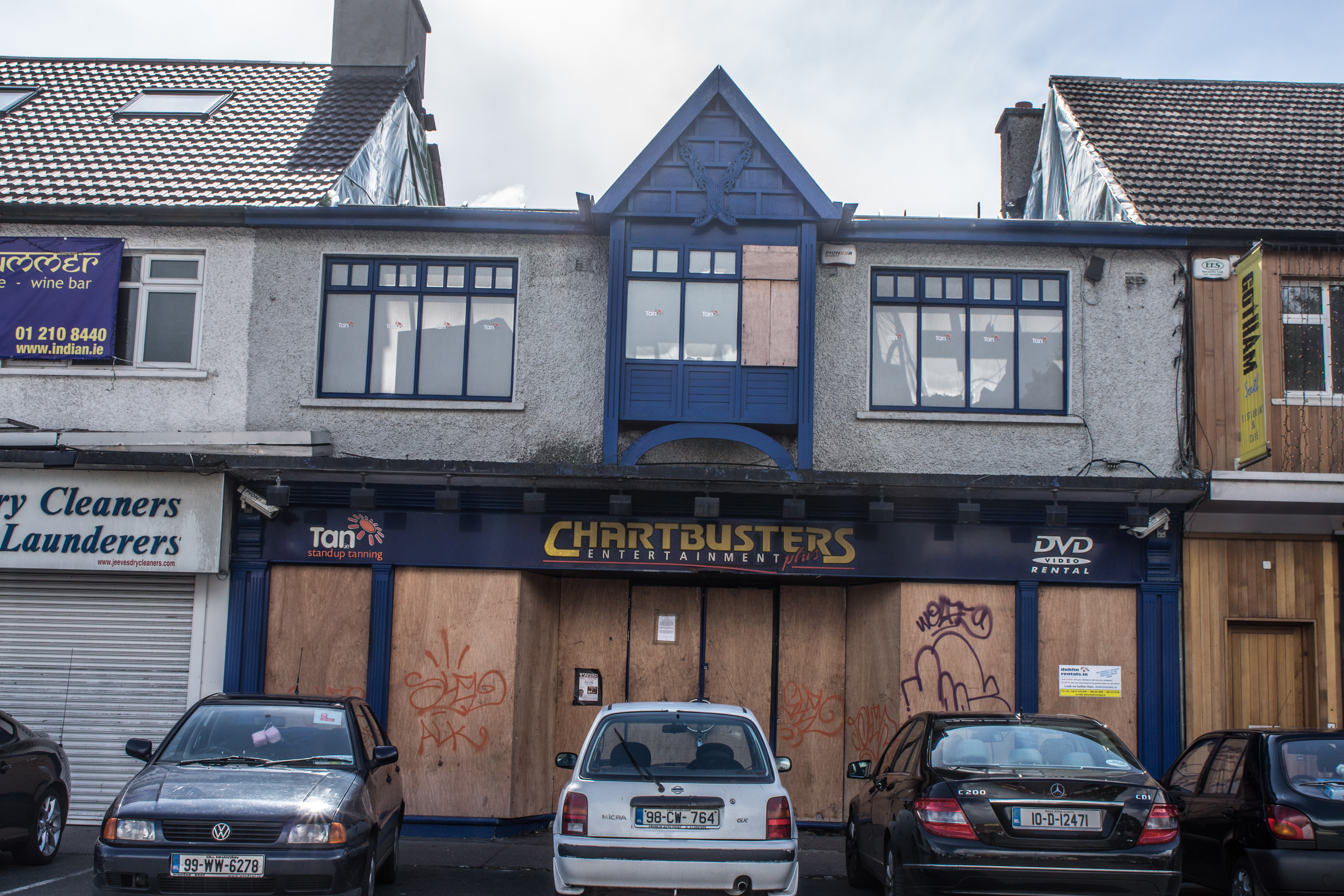
Fire damaged premises in Stillorgan, 2011

The first store that opened was in Blanchardstown followed by the second in Tallaght, both of which were classed as superstores and were reported to be generating £6,500 to £7,000 per week in 1994. In 2003, stores began to offer stand tanning under the company's tan.ie branding in the outlets. At the height of their popularity, in 2004, the chain had 52 stores across Ireland. By 2009, there were 44 stores open.

On 21 January 2011, a fire broke out in the vacant Chartbusters store in Stillorgan resulting in the adjacent restaurant and Mill House pub to be evacuated.

=== Liquidation ===
In 2009, Chartbusters' debts mounted to €20 million and they declared that they had gone bust, later going into examinership. The company made an announcement that they were to cease trading on 29 October 2010 with the loss of 87 jobs. The petition for winding up was struck out on 15 November 2010.
