= Barber (film) =

- Theatrical release poster
- Directed by: Fintan Connolly
- Written by: Fiona Bergin; Fintan Connolly
- Produced by: Fiona Bergin
- Starring: Aidan Gillen
- Cinematography: Owen McPolin
- Edited by: Nicolas de Toth
- Music by: Forrest Gray
- Production company: Fubar Films with the participation of Fís Éireann/Screen Ireland
- Release date: February 2023 (Dublin International Film Festival)
- Running time: 90 minutes
- Country: Ireland
- Language: English

Barber is a 2023 Irish thriller film starring Aidan Gillen. The film is written by Fiona Bergin and Fintan Connolly, produced by Bergin and directed by Connolly. It premiered at the 2023 Dublin International Film Festival.

== Premise ==
Val Barber, a private investigator, is hired by a wealthy widow to find her missing granddaughter.

== Cast ==
- Aidan Gillen
- Aisling Kearns
- Gary Lydon
- Helen Behan
- Deirdre Donnelly
- Camille O'Sullivan
- Ruaidhri Conroy
- Nick Dunning
- Jimmy Smallhorne

== Release ==
The film received a theatrical release in Ireland on 14 April 2023.

== Reception ==
A Film Ireland review said of the film, "This character study of a fragmented man searching for connection is certainly well timed for the post COVID era; Barber is an ambitious, accomplished film with a lot to offer". Writing in the Irish Examiner, Declan Burke described it as "nowhere as bleak as the blackest of noirs tend to be, but Fintan Connolly, who also directs, has crafted a thoughtful, nuanced film that goes beyond the genre's conventions to deliver a noir with real heart".
