= 50,000 Secret Journeys =

- Genre: Documentary
- Created by: Fintan Connolly; Hilary Dully
- Country of origin: Ireland
- Original language: English

Production
- Running time: 25 minutes
- Production company: The Picture House

Original release
- Network: RTÉ One
- Release: 29 March 1994

50,000 Secret Journeys is an Irish documentary made by Fintan Connolly and Hilary Dully for RTÉ One in 1994. The documentary comprised interviews with three Irish women about their experiences of abortion. The 25-minute film was interspersed with news archive footage giving historical context to the abortion debate in Ireland.

== Controversy ==
50,000 Secret Journeys was pulled from the RTÉ schedule on 29 March 1994. The decision provoked a strong protest from the station's film-makers. The Tuesday File film "50,000 Secret Journeys" was to be screened after the main evening news. A statement issued by SIPTU on behalf of the TV producer/director and director grades regretted the decision of Director of Television not to broadcast the programme. "It's a matter of serious concern to TV producers and directors that such a programme should be deemed unsuitable for inclusion in one of RTÉ's main current affairs programmes," it said. An RTÉ spokesperson said the decision had been taken "for internal RTÉ reasons which we don't want to go into."

The documentary was eventually screened on RTÉ on 27 October 1994 at a later time and was followed by a studio debate on abortion in Ireland chaired by Marian Finucane. “We were never actually told that they wouldn’t show it, and it was kind of suggested that they would – but not then,” says Hilary Dully. “We were told that it lacked balance, and that one of the reasons for this was that the women involved didn’t express sufficient remorse.” RTÉ's decision put commissioning editor John Masterson in an impossible position, and he resigned from his post as head of Tuesday File and moved out of current affairs broadcasting. He subsequently became a producer on The Late Late Show.

Speaking in 2013 Masterson wrote “In 1993 I was editor of an RTÉ current affairs series called Tuesday File. My brief included commissioning a small number of programmes from independent producers and we advertised for proposals. One I chose was submitted by a talented team, Fintan Connolly and Hilary Dully. They proposed to interview three women who had been to London for abortions and who agreed to discuss their experiences. After four years as executive producer of Today Tonight (the Prime Time of its day) I was well familiar with editorial procedures when dealing with sensitive topics. Having run the proposal up the relevant flagpoles, I was given the go-ahead to commission the programme. It was called 50,000 Secret Journeys. The programme-makers did a first-class job. The programme was viewed at various stages and, the final version having been cleared, it was scheduled and advertised for transmission on March 29, 1994, at 9.30pm. At a very late stage it was pulled, for reasons I did not accept. I felt I had let the young filmmakers down. I resigned my position. The programme, with one very minor cut, was transmitted on October 27 in a much later time slot and followed by a studio discussion chaired by Marian Finucane. This could easily have been done on March 29 had anyone so wished. The programme could be transmitted today. It could merely be renamed 150,000 Secret Journeys.”

The fact that the abortion narratives of three Irish women were shared in such a public manner on Irish television would have to be noted as a key turning point in abortion discourse in Ireland. The open and honest natures of the interviews in 50,000 Secret Journeys about personal experiences of abortion enabled a ‘cultural conversation’ where the media also served as an ‘ongoing participant’.

== Repeal of the Eighth Amendment ==
On 25 May 2018, the Irish people voted by 66.4% to 33.6% in a referendum to repeal the Eighth Amendment. They approved the Thirty-sixth Amendment of the Constitution Bill 2018 to delete the current provisions of Article 40.3.3º and replace it with the following:

3º Provision may be made by law for the regulation of termination of pregnancy.
