= Zara World =

- Genre: Children Documentary
- Created by: Fintan Connolly; Fiona Bergin
- Starring: Zara Gleeson
- Country of origin: Ireland
- Original language: English
- No. of series: 1
- No. of episodes: 10

Production
- Producer: Fiona Bergin
- Running time: 8 minutes
- Production company: Fubar Films

Original release
- Network: RTÉjr
- Release: 13 October – 24 October 2014

Zara World is an Irish documentary series, produced by Fubar Films and screened on RTÉjr. The series premiered on Monday 13 October 2014. It features a seven-year-old girl called Zara who lives with her family in Dublin city. Filmed over six months, each episode features a small snapshot of Zara's life. The series is produced by Fiona Bergin and filmed and directed by Fintan Connolly.

== Plot ==
Zara World follows Zara Gleeson as she goes about the business of being seven. Zara goes on trips to the beach, park, library, playground, zoo and aquarium as well as a day trip to Bray, plays games with her friends, does Taekwondo training and spends time with her family. Zara's Dad Gordon, big sister, Ali, and younger brother, Zack play an important role in the documentaries.

== Series 1 (2014) ==
No.	Title	Directed by	Original release date
1	"beach"	Fintan Connolly	13 October 2014
Zara goes to the beach with her dad Gordon, big sister Ali, younger brother Zack and the family dog Max.
2	"play"	Fintan Connolly	14 October 2014
Zara goes to the playground with her big sister Ali, younger brother Zack and her friends Eva, Ali and Kori.
3	"library"	Fintan Connolly	15 October 2014
Zara goes to the library with her big sister Ali, younger brother Zack and her friends Ali, Kori, Zoe and Kian.
4	"taekwondo"	Fintan Connolly	16 October 2014
Zara goes to a Tae Kwon Do class with her big sister Ali and takes part in her first competition.
5	"park"	Fintan Connolly	17 October 2014
Zara and her family visit St Stephen’s Green.
6	"zoo"	Fintan Connolly	20 October 2014
Zara goes to the zoo with her dad Gordon, mum Ethna, big brother Dean, big sister Ali and younger brother Zack.
7	"games"	Fintan Connolly	21 October 2014
Zara plays on the street with her friends Eva, Zoe, Ali, Kori and Kian.
8	"aquarium"	Fintan Connolly	22 October 2014
Zara goes to the aquarium with her dad Gordon, big sister Ali and younger brother Zack.
9	"festival"	Fintan Connolly	23 October 2014
Zara goes to the Street Performers World Championship with her dad Gordon and big sister Ali.
10	"amusements"	Fintan Connolly	24 October 2014
Zara and her family go on a day out to Bray.

== Music ==
The score for Zara World is written by Stephen Rennicks.
