= Fubar Films =

Irish film and television production company

- Company type: Production company
- Industry: Film Television
- Headquarters: Dublin, Ireland
- Key people: Fiona Bergin
- Website: http://fubarfilm.wix.com/fubarfilms

Fubar Films is an Irish film and television production company based in Dublin, Ireland. Fubar Films has been responsible for the production of Flick, Trouble with Sex, Eliot & Me, and comedy series On the Couch. Key people in the production company include producer Fiona Bergin and director Fintan Connolly.

== Productions ==
=== Film ===
- Flick (2000) feature
- Trouble with Sex (2005) feature
- Eliot & Me (2012) feature
- Barber (2022) feature

=== Television ===
- On the Couch (2013)
- Zara World (2014)
- Circus World (2016)
- All Aboard (2018)
