= Beckett on Film =

- Directed by: Michael Lindsay-Hogg; Conor McPherson; Patricia Rozema; Karel Reisz; Enda Hughes; Atom Egoyan; Kieron J. Walsh; Katie Mitchell; Anthony Minghella; John Crowley; Damien Hirst; Neil Jordan; Charles Garrad; Walter Asmus; Robin Lefevre; Richard Eyre; Charles Sturridge; David Mamet; Damien O'Donnell
- Written by: Samuel Beckett
- Produced by: Michael Colgan; Alan Moloney
- Starring: Penelope Wilton; Harold Pinter; Julianne Moore; Barry McGovern; Johnny Murphy; Michael Gambon; David Thewlis; John Hurt; Jim Norton; Timothy Spall; Alan Rickman; Kristen Scott Thomas; Rosaleen Linehan; Sean Foley; Juliet Stevenson; David Kelly; Rebecca Pidgeon; Jeremy Irons; John Gielgud
- Release date: 29 August 2002
- Running time: 647 minutes
- Language: English

Beckett on Film was a project aimed at making film versions of all nineteen of Samuel Beckett's stage plays, with the exception of the early and unperformed Eleutheria. This endeavour was successfully completed, with the first films being shown in 2001.

The project was conceived by Michael Colgan, artistic director of Dublin's Gate Theatre. The films were produced by Colgan and Alan Moloney for the Irish broadcaster RTÉ, the British broadcaster Channel 4 and the Irish Film Board. Each had a different cast and director, drawn from theatre, film and other fields.

Ten of the films were screened at the 2000 Toronto International Film Festival and some were shown on Channel 4 in June 2001 and on RTÉ in Ireland in 2001. On Wednesday 6 February 2002, the series won the Best TV Drama award at the 6th The South Bank Show Award at the Savoy Theatre in London. The films never enjoyed a general cinematic release, but for seven days between 2 and 8 February 2001, all nineteen were screened at the Irish Film Institute (then called the Irish Film Centre) in Dublin. For eight days between 13 and 20 September 2001, all nineteen were screened at the Barbican Centre in London, with live appearances from its leading actors and directors. They were also released in a number of videos and as a four-DVD box set in 2003, comprising a souvenir programme, several additional features, and including the video documentary Check the Gate: Putting Beckett on Film.

The video documentary, titled Check the Gate: Putting Beckett on Film, directed by Pearse Lehane, was released first on the DVD. It followed closely the project's work.

The ten films screened at the 2000 Toronto International Film Festival (TIFF) in Canada, were: Act Without Words I (dir. by Karel Reisz), Catastrophe (dir. by David Mamet), Endgame (dir. by Conor McPherson), Happy Days (dir. by Patricia Rozema), Krapp's Last Tape (dir. by Atom Egoyan), Not I (dir. by Neil Jordan), Play (dir. by Anthony Minghella), Rockaby (dir. by Sir Richard Eyre), Rough for Theatre I (dir. by Kieron J. Walsh), and What Where (dir. by Damien O'Donnell).

In the US, New York-based PBS television station WNET released a programme titled Stage on Screen: Beckett On Film, which showed eight of the films, which were: Catastrophe (2001) dir. by David Mamet, Ohio Impromptu (2002) dir. by Charles Sturridge, Come and Go (2000) dir. by John Crowley, Breath (2001) dir. by Damien Hirst, Play (2001) dir. by Anthony Minghella, Act Without Words II (2001) dir. by Enda Hughes, What Where (2000) dir. by Damien O'Donnell, and Waiting for Godot (2001) dir. by Michael Lindsay-Hogg. They premiered across two dates on 15 September 2002 and 1 January 2003. This programme later won a 2002 Peabody Award at the 62nd annual awards ceremony for the two main production companies, Blue Angel Films Ltd. and Tyrone Productions.

== Credits ==
=== Waiting for Godot ===
The play was originally published in 1952. Of directing the film version, Michael Lindsay-Hogg said, "Beckett creates an amazing blend of comedy, high wit and an almost unbearable poignancy in a funny yet heartbreaking image of man's fate. With the camera, you can pick those moments and emphasise them, making Beckett's rare and extraordinary words all the more intimate [...]. The play is about what it is about. Samuel Beckett would have said it's about two men waiting on the side of the road for someone to turn up. But you can invest in the importance of who is going to turn up. Is it a local farmer? Is it God? Is it salvation? Or is it simply someone who just doesn't show up?

"The important thing is the ambiguity, the fact that it doesn't really state what it is. That's why it's so great for the audience to be part of it: they fill in a lot of the blanks; it works in their imaginations.

"For me, Beckett's view of the world is quite sadly accurate. We are all really just bugs in the carpet."

The cast was composed of the following:

- Vladimir: Barry McGovern
- Estragon: Johnny Murphy
- Pozzo: Alan Stanford
- Lucky: Stephen Brennan
- The Boy: Sam McGovern
- Director: Michael Lindsay-Hogg
- Running Time: 2 hours

=== Endgame ===
Original play published 1957.

- Hamm – Michael Gambon
- Clov – David Thewlis
- Nagg – Charles Simon
- Nell – Jean Anderson
- Directed by Conor McPherson
- Running Time – 1 hour 24 minutes

=== Happy Days ===
Original play published 1960.

- Winnie – Rosaleen Linehan
- Willie – Richard Johnson
- Directed by Patricia Rozema
- Running Time – 1 hour 19 minutes

=== Act Without Words I ===
Original play written 1956.

- Mime – Sean Foley
- Directed by Karel Reisz
- Running Time – 16 minutes

=== Act Without Words II ===
Original play written 1956.

- A – Pat Kinevane
- B – Marcello Magni
- Directed by Enda Hughes
- Running Time – 11 minutes

=== Krapp's Last Tape ===
Original play written 1958.

- Krapp – John Hurt
- Directed by Atom Egoyan
- Running Time – 58 minutes

=== Rough for Theatre I ===
Original play written late 1950s.

- A – David Kelly
- B – Milo O'Shea
- Directed by Kieron J. Walsh
- Running Time – 20 minutes

=== Rough for Theatre II ===
Original play written late 1950s.

- A – Jim Norton
- B – Timothy Spall
- C – Hugh B. O'Brien
- Directed by Katie Mitchell
- Running Time – 30 minutes

=== Play ===
Original play written 1963.

- M – Alan Rickman
- W1 – Kristin Scott Thomas
- W2 – Juliet Stevenson
- Directed by Anthony Minghella
- Running Time – 16 minutes

=== Come and Go ===
Original play written 1965.

- Vi – Anna Massey
- Ru – Siân Phillips
- Flo – Paola Dionisotti
- Directed by John Crowley
- Running Time – 8 minutes

=== Breath ===
Original play written 1969.

- Voice – Keith Allen
- Directed by Damien Hirst
- Running Time – 45 seconds

=== Not I ===
Original play written 1972.

- Auditor/Mouth – Julianne Moore
- Directed by Neil Jordan
- Running Time – 14 minutes

=== That Time ===
Original play written 1975.

- Listener and Voices – Niall Buggy
- Directed by Charles Garrad
- Running Time – 20 minutes

=== Footfalls ===
Original play written 1975.

- May – Susan Fitzgerald
- Voice – Joan O'Hara
- Directed by Walter Asmus
- Running Time – 28 minutes

=== A Piece of Monologue ===
Original play written 1980.

- Speaker – Stephen Brennan
- Directed by Robin Lefevre
- Running Time – 20 minutes

=== Rockaby ===
Original play written 1981.

- Woman – Penelope Wilton
- Directed by Richard Eyre
- Running Time – 14 minutes

=== Ohio Impromptu ===
Original play written 1981.

- Reader and Listener – Jeremy Irons
- Directed by Charles Sturridge
- Running Time – 12 minutes

=== Catastrophe ===
Original play written 1982.

- P – John Gielgud
- A – Rebecca Pidgeon
- D – Harold Pinter
- L – ?
- Directed by David Mamet
- Running Time – 7 minutes

=== What Where ===
Original play written 1983.

- Bam – Sean McGinley
- Bem, Bim and Bom – Gary Lewis
- Directed by Damien O'Donnell
- Running Time – 12 minutes

== Criticism ==
Reviews were generally laudatory. Michael Dwyer, film correspondent of The Irish Times, called it "commendably ambitious and remarkably successful, a truly unique collection".
