= Richard Murphy (businessman) =

Irish entrepreneur (born 1961)

- Born: 1961 (age 64–65); Kimmage, Dublin, Ireland
- Known for: Founder of Xtra-vision and Chartbusters

Richard Murphy is an Irish businessman and entrepreneur, best known for being the founder of the now defunct video rental chains Xtra-vision and Chartbusters.

== Early life ==
Murphy was born in 1961 in Kimmage, Dublin. He was educated at St Andrews High School. His first job was as a motorcycle courier during which he got a compensation after suffering a leg injury. Using the compensation and his savings he founded Xtra-vision in 1979.

== Career ==
After opening the first Xtra-vision in Ranelagh, the company made Murphy worth around 26 million euro by the time he was 29. He left the company in 1990, taking his fraction of the ownership value with him. After American giants Blockbuster bought Xtra0vision in 1993, Murphy decided to set up a new company, called Chartbusters to compete, which it did successfully for some time.

== Personal life ==
Murphy has three daughters.
