= Hazel Webb-Crozier =

British costume designer

Hazel Webb-Crozier is a costume designer from Belfast, Northern Ireland. Since 1990, she has been involved with costume design for the British and Irish film and television industries and in 2005 won her first IFTA for her work on Mickybo and Me. Webb-Crozier has managed the costume and wardrobe department on high-profile Hollywood films such as Your Highness, Closing the Ring, Cherrybomb and Wilderness, and for television series Tom Jones and The Woman in the Wall.

== Life ==
Hazel Webb-Crozier is a costume designer from Belfast, Northern Ireland.

Since 1990, she has been involved with costume design for the British and Irish film and television industries and in 2005 won her first IFTA for her work on Mickybo and Me, a film telling the story of two local Northern Irish children, one Catholic and one Protestant, who become friends at the start of the troubles in 1970.

Webb-Crozier has managed the costume and wardrobe department on high-profile Hollywood films such as Your Highness (2011), Closing the Ring (2007), Cherrybomb (2009), Wilderness (2006), and Whole Lotta Sole (2012). More recently, she has costumed for television series, including in the 2023 series Tom Jones, for which she had to learn the design and construction of eighteenth century clothes. Initially she had planned to hire period-appropriate costumes but a competing production filming at the same time meant Webb-Crozier constructed many pieces by hand herself.

Web-Crozier also designed costumes for 2023 drama series The Woman in the Wall.
