= Barbara Bergin =

Irish actress, writer and director

Barbara Bergin is an Irish actress, writer and director.

Among her acting credits are comedy sketch show Stew, Fair City, The Snapper, The Van and Intermission. Theatre credits include Cell by Paula Meehan, for which she won an Irish Times Irish Theatre Award and the Corn Exchange's adaptation of Dubliners by James Joyce.

Her writing credits include The Clinic and the IFTA award-winning Love Is the Drug. She directed On the Couch, a six-part comedy drama she created and wrote with Gary Cooke. Her debut play Dublin Gothic premiered in The Abbey Theatre, Ireland's National Theatre on 27th November 2025 and is a finalist for the Susan Smith Blackburn prize 2026.
