= Circus World (TV series) =

Irish documentary TV series

- Genre: Children; Documentary
- Created by: Fintan Connolly; Fiona Bergin
- Starring: Blake, Michael and Isabella Gerbola
- Country of origin: Ireland
- Original language: English
- No. of series: 1
- No. of episodes: 10

Production
- Producer: Fiona Bergin
- Running time: 7 minutes
- Production company: Fubar Films

Original release
- Network: RTÉjr
- Release: 4 July – 15 July 2016

Circus World is an Irish documentary series, produced by Fubar Films and screened on RTÉjr. The series premiered on Monday 4 July 2016. It follows the adventures of three children as they travel around Ireland with their mum and dad's circus. The series is produced by Fiona Bergin and filmed and directed by Fintan Connolly.

== Plot ==
Set in and around a real Irish circus, Blake (10), Michael (8), Isabella (5) and their parents Mikey and Tara Gerbola are the hosts. The ten part series follows the adventures of these three lively children as they travel all around Ireland putting up their tent.

Each episode features a circus performer and their big top performance. The series introduces different circus artistes from around the world and shows children trying out new skills. Among the acts and activities featured are: clowning, acrobatics, wire walking, roller skating, magic, juggling, slapstick, flying, gymnastics and finale.

Each episode culminates with an entertaining aspect of the children' s life on the road. They are in a different county every day.

== Tagline ==
"Brings all the fun and excitement of the circus to your screen."

== Episodes ==
No.	Title	Original release date
1	"The Circus Comes to Town"	July 4, 2016
2	"Aunty Lisa Teaches Blake, Michael, and Isabella to Climb"	July 5, 2016
3	"Cesar the Wire-Walker"	July 6, 2016
4	"Thomas the Roller Skater"	July 7, 2016
5	"Aunty Lisa and Amy Make People Disappear"	July 8, 2016
6	"Lenka the Juggler"	July 11, 2016
7	"Domingo and Mikey’s New Acts"	July 12, 2016
8	"Aunty Lisa and the Flying Hoop"	July 13, 2016
9	"Melany the Contortionist"	July 14, 2016
10	"Amy the Dancer"	July 15, 2016
