= Aidan Gillen =

Irish actor (born 1968)

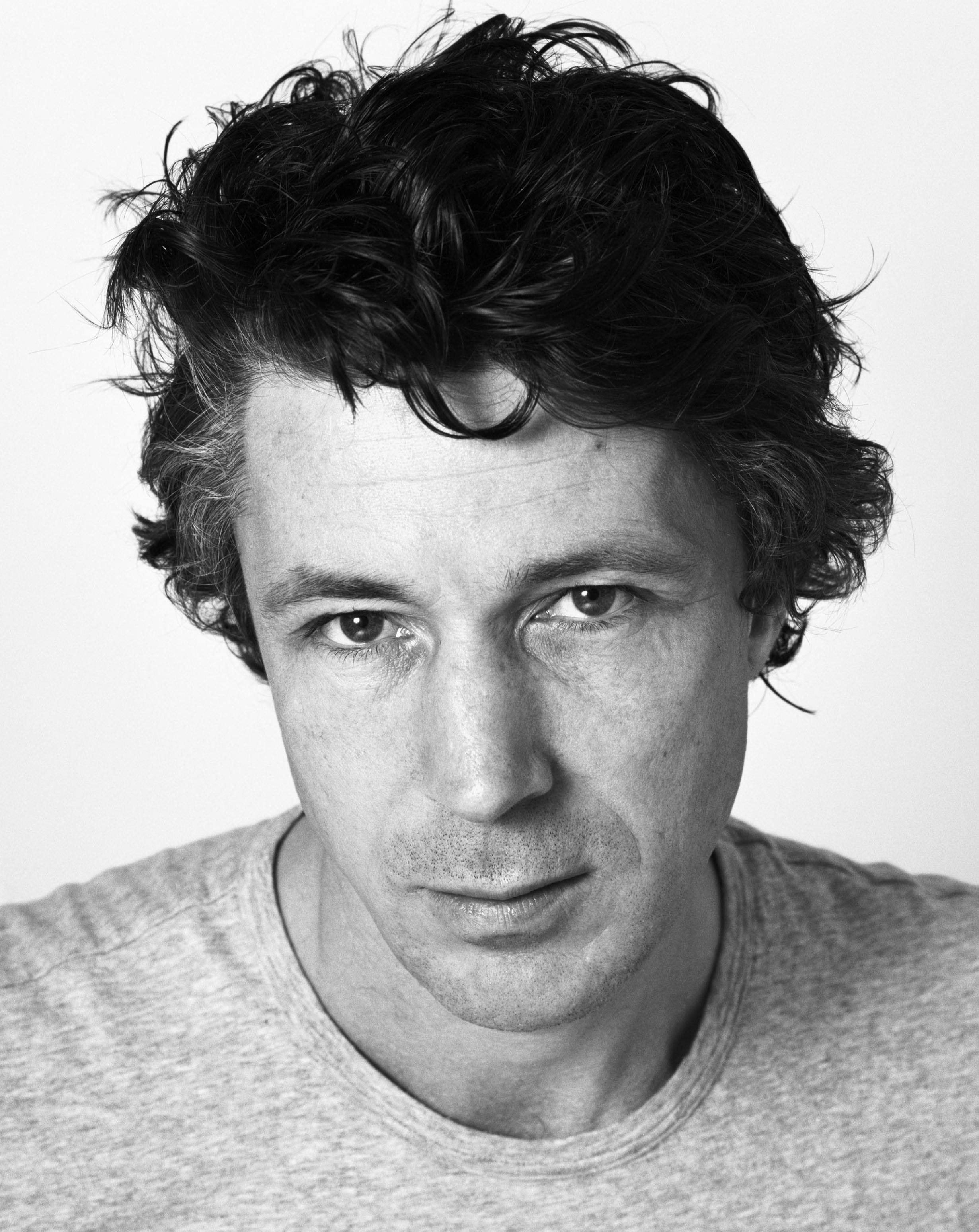
- Gillen in 2010
- Born: Aidan Murphy; 24 April 1968 (age 58); Dublin, Ireland
- Occupation: Actor
- Years active: 1981–present
- Spouse: Olivia O'Flanagan (m. 2001; sep. 2005)
- Partner(s): Camille O'Sullivan (2014–present)
- Children: 2

Aidan Murphy (born 24 April 1968), known professionally as Aidan Gillen (/ˈɡɪlən/), is an Irish actor. He is the recipient of three Irish Film & Television Awards and has been nominated for a British Academy Television Award, a British Independent Film Award, a Tony Award, and a Drama Desk Award.

Gillen is known to television audiences for his roles as Stuart Alan Jones in Queer as Folk (1999–2000); Tommy Carcetti in The Wire (2004–2008); John Boy Power in Love/Hate (2010–2011); Petyr "Littlefinger" Baelish in Game of Thrones (2011–2017); Aberama Gold in Peaky Blinders (2017–2019); Milo Sunter in Mayor of Kingstown (2021–2024); and Frank Kinsella in Kin (2021–2023).

His film roles include Lord Nelson Rathbone in Shanghai Knights (2003), as 'CIA' in The Dark Knight Rises (2012), Dr. Frank Harte in Calvary (2014), Janson in Maze Runner: The Scorch Trials (2015) and Maze Runner: The Death Cure (2018), Robert in Sing Street (2016), and John Reid in Bohemian Rhapsody (2018).

== Early life and education ==
Gillen was born Aidan Murphy in the Drumcondra area of Dublin, the youngest of six children born to Patricia (née Gillen) and Denis Murphy, on 24 April 1968. He was educated at St. Vincent's C.B.S. in Dublin's Glasnevin neighbourhood.

Gillen joined the National Youth Theatre (Note: This is variously quoted in sources, and the National Portrait Gallery mentions an "Irish Youth Theatre", but most likely refers to the Youth Theatre Ireland and its annual programme called National Youth Theatre, rather than the (British) National Youth Theatre.) at the age of fourteen, and also joined Dublin Youth Theatre in his teens. His career began when he was 16, with the role of Nick Bottom in the Dublin Youth Theatre's production of A Midsummer Night's Dream at the Project Theatre in 1983.

He obtained his Equity card straight after leaving school, and began getting small professional roles at 17. The name Aidan Murphy was already registered so he began using his mother's maiden name as a stage name. He moved to London in 1987 when he was 18 or 19.

== Career ==
=== Stage ===
Gillen's first role on a London stage was at the Bush Theatre, in Billy Roche's Wexford Trilogy. Soon afterwards he had a role in Juno and the Paycock at the Royal National Theatre.

In 2005, he played one of three men in a prison cell in Dominic Dromgoole's production of Irish playwright Frank McGuinness's 1992 hostage drama, Someone Who'll Watch Over Me at the New Ambassadors in London.

In 2008, Gillen played Teach in the Dublin Gate Theatre's 2007 production of David Mamet's American Buffalo.

Gillen had his Broadway debut playing Mick, alongside Patrick Stewart and Kyle MacLachlan, in Harold Pinter's play The Caretaker in 2003, directed by David Jones. The New York Times reviewer Ben Brantley called his performance a "smashing Broadway debut".

=== Screen ===
During the 1990s, Gillen played a number of roles in television dramas and series, including a TV adaptations of the Wexford Trilogy. Gillen played a lead role as Stuart Alan Jones in the 1999 Channel 4 television series Queer as Folk and its sequel.

In 1997, he appeared alongside playwright Harold Pinter in Mojo based on the 1995 play of the same name by Jez Butterworth and directed by Butterworth.

In 2000, he starred in The Low Down, director Jamie Thraves' first feature film. The film was named among the "neglected masterpieces" of film history by The Observer in its rundown of 50 Lost Movie Classics.

In 2003, he played the villain in the Shanghai Noon sequel, Shanghai Knights.

In 2004, having been spotted by producers in The Caretaker, Gillen was cast as Tommy Carcetti in the HBO series The Wire, for which he received an Irish Film & Television Award for Best Actor in a Lead Role in Television.

In 2011, Gillen began playing Petyr "Littlefinger" Baelish on the HBO series Game of Thrones, for which he received his second Irish Film & Television Award nomination. He appeared in seven seasons, until his character's death in the season 7 finale "The Dragon and the Wolf". He starred as cop killer Barry Weiss in the British crime-thriller Blitz and in the British horror film Wake Wood. Gillen played crime boss John Boy in the acclaimed Irish crime-drama Love/Hate, for which he received his third Irish Film & Television Award nomination and second win.

In 2012, he played CIA operative Bill Wilson (the character's name is from the novelisation; his name is not directly said in the film's script) in The Dark Knight Rises, his first role in a major Hollywood film. Gillen said he enjoyed playing the role, but preferred low-budget lead roles to blockbuster bit-parts. Gillen's character was particularly noted by some Internet circles for his delivery of supposedly awkward dialogue in the film's opening plane scene, especially by users of 4chan's /tv/ board. Thus, he subsequently became the subject of an Internet meme popular among /tv/ users known as "Baneposting", which references the dialogue between Wilson and Tom Hardy's character Bane in said scene. The same year, Gillen also starred in the British spy-drama Shadow Dancer, and was announced as the new host of the music show Other Voices.

He starred in the BBC five-part thriller Mayday in 2013, and the Irish comedy-drama film Calvary the following year. He shared a Screen Actors Guild Award nomination with the cast of Game of Thrones for Outstanding Performance by an Ensemble in a Drama Series. Gillen also starred in the short film Ekki Múkk, created for the Valtari Mystery Film Experiment by Icelandic band Sigur Rós, as well as Janson in the second film, The Scorch Trials, and third film, Maze Runner: The Death Cure, in the Maze Runner trilogy.

Gillen played Queen's manager John Reid in the biopic Bohemian Rhapsody, which was released on 2 November 2018. He starred as Aidan in the short film titled I Didn't...I Wasn't...I Amn't, written and directed by Irish actress Laoisa Sexton.

He starred in The History Channel's two-season series Project Blue Book from 2019 to 2020. Gillen played Dr. J. Allen Hynek, a brilliant and underappreciated college professor who is recruited by the U.S. Air Force to spearhead an operation named Project Blue Book. He is joined by his partner Air Force Capt. Michael Quinn as they investigate UFO sightings around the country.

Gillen co-wrote the script of and starred in Jamie Thraves' fourth feature film, Pickups (2017). This was the third collaboration with Thraves.

He plays Frank Kinsella, a member of a prominent Irish crime family, in the RTÉ One crime drama Kin (2021–2023).

== Personal life ==
Gillen resides in his native Dublin. He met Olivia O'Flanagan when they were teenagers. They have two children. They married in 2001 and separated in 2005.

Gillen has been in a relationship with singer Camille O'Sullivan since 2014.

== Filmography ==
=== Film ===
Year	Title	Role	Notes
1985	The Drip	Young Guy	Short film
1987	The Lonely Passion of Judith Hearne	Youth at Liquor Store	Credited as 'Aidan Murphy'
1988	The Courier	Boy	Credited as 'Aidan Murphy'
1995	Circle of Friends	Aidan Lynch	
1996	Some Mother's Son	Gerard Quigley	
1997	Mojo	Baby	
1998	Gold in the Streets	Paddy	
1998	Amazing Grace	Young Man	Short film
1999	Buddy Boy	Francis	
2000	The Second Death	Pool Player	Short film
2000	The Low Down	Frank	
2001	My Kingdom	Barry Puttnam	
2001	Robertson Major	William Robertson	Short film
2002	The Final Curtain	Dave Turner	
2003	Photo Finish	Joe Wilde	
2003	Shanghai Knights	Lord Nelson Rathbone	
2003	Burning the Bed	Stephen	Short film
2006	Trouble with Sex	Conor	
2008	Blackout	Karl	
2009	12 Rounds	Miles Jackson	
2009	Spunkbubble	Dessie	Short film
2009	Runners	Terry	Short film
2010	Treacle Jr.	Aidan	
2011	Wake Wood	Patrick Daley	
2011	Blitz	Barry Weiss	
2012	The Dark Knight Rises	CIA Op	
2012	Shadow Dancer	Gerry	
2012	Ekki Múkk	Little One	Short film
2012	The Good Man	Michael	
2013	Scrapper	Ray	
2013	The Note	Lars	Short film
2013	Mister John	Gerry Devine	
2013	Beneath the Harvest Sky	Clayton	
2013	Song	Dan	Short film
2014	Calvary	Dr. Frank Harte	
2014	Still	Tom Carver	
2014	Song	Dan	Short film
2014	Ambition	Master	Short film
2015	You're Ugly Too	Will	
2015	Maze Runner: The Scorch Trials	Janson	
2016	Sing Street	Robert	
2017	The Lovers	Robert	
2017	King Arthur: Legend of the Sword	Goosefat Bill	
2018	Maze Runner: The Death Cure	Janson	
2018	Bohemian Rhapsody	John Reid	
2019	I Didn't...I Wasn't...I Amn't	Aidan	Short film
2019	Rose Plays Julie	Peter	
2021	Those Who Wish Me Dead	Jack Blackwell	
2023	Barber	Val Barber	
2023	Dance First	James Joyce	
2024	Amongst The Wolves	Power	
2024	London Calling	Freddy Darby	
2025	Re-creation	Hamilton Barnes	
2025	The Physician II	Physician Hunne	
2026	Gorky Resort	Vasily Zarubin	
2026	Cold War 1994	F.M.	Hong Kong film
2026	7 Miles Out	Ronald Westbourne	
2027	Panic Carefully		

=== Television ===
Year	Title	Role	Notes
1982	Wanderly Wagon	Shadow	
1990	The Play on One	Harry	Episode: "Killing Time"
1992	An Ungentlemanly Act	Marine Wilcox	Television film
1993	A Handful of Stars	Tony	Television film
1993	Belfry	Dominic	Television film
1993	The Bill	Jeff Barratt	Episode: "Play the Game"
1993	Screenplay	Gypo	Episode: "Safe"
1994	In Suspicious Circumstances	James Crozier	Episode: "To Encourage the Others"
1999–2000	Queer as Folk	Stuart Alan Jones	10 episodes
2000	The Darkling	Jeff Obold	Television film
2000	Lorna Doone	Carver Doone	Television film
2001	Dice	Glenn Taylor	2 episodes
2002	First Communion Day	Seamus	Television film
2003	Agatha Christie's Poirot	Amyas Crale	Episode: "Five Little Pigs"
2004–2008	The Wire	Thomas J. "Tommy" Carcetti	35 episodes
2005	Law & Order: Trial by Jury	Jimmy Colby	Episode: "Vigilante"
2005	The Last Detective	Steve Fallon	Episode: "Willesden Confidential"
2005	Walk Away and I Stumble	Paul	Television film
2009	Freefall	Gus	Television film
2010	Thorne	Phil Hendricks	6 episodes
2010	Identity	DI John Bloom	6 episodes
2010–2011	Love/Hate	John Boy Power	10 episodes
2011–2017	Game of Thrones	Petyr Baelish	41 episodes
2011–2013	Other Voices	Himself (host)	
2013	Mayday	Everett Newcombe	5 episodes
2015	Charlie	Charles J. Haughey	3 episodes
2017	Urban Myths	Timothy Leary	Episode: "Cary Grant and Timothy Leary"
2017–2019	Peaky Blinders	Aberama Gold	10 episodes
2018	Dave Allen at Peace	Dave Allen	Television film
2019–2020	Project Blue Book	J. Allen Hynek	20 episodes
2021	Killers of the Cosmos	Gumshoe detective (voice)	6 episodes
2021–2023	Kin	Frank Kinsella	16 episodes
2021–2024	Mayor of Kingstown	Milo Sunter	22 episodes
2022	That Dirty Black Bag	Butler	2 episodes
2022	Chicago Party Aunt	Small Man (voice)	Episode: "St. Patrick's Day"
2024	Rock Paper Scissors	Steven Shadowwhispers (voice)	Episode: "Trash"
2026	Tall Tales & Murder	Grinner McNair	6 episodes
TBA	Saviour	Eddie	Main role

=== Music video appearances ===
Year	Title	Artist	Ref.
2012	"Ekki múkk"	Sigur Rós	
2014	"Valentine"	I Draw Slow	
2016	"Cameo"	Mick Flannery	
2019	"When We Go Out"	Vinci	
2019	"Lived Through This Before"	Barry McCormack	
2020	"A Hero's Death"	Fontaines D.C.	
2020	"Distant Shores"	Barry McCormack	

=== Audiobooks ===
Year	Title	Notes
1994	Paddy Clarke Ha Ha Ha	
1995	Felicia's Journey	
1995	The Barrytown Trilogy: The Commitments	
1998	Irish Short Stories	
2010	The Poetry of Ireland	
2015	The Art of War	

=== Video games ===
Year	Title	voice role	Notes
2016	Quantum Break	Paul Serene	Also motion capture

== Stage credits ==
Year	Title	Role	Venue(s)
1981	The Do-It-Yourself Frankenstein Outfit	Robot	Dublin Youth Theatre
1985	Our Day Out	Andrews	Dublin Youth Theatre
1985	A Midsummer Night's Dream	Nick Bottom	National Youth Theatre
1988	The Wexford Trilogy: A Hand of Stars	Tony	Bush Theatre
1989	Juno and the Paycock	Soldier	Royal National Theatre
1989	Blue	Ed Ache / Fred	National Theatre Studio
1989	The Long Way Round	Albin	Royal National Theatre
1989	The Water Engine	Bernie	Hampstead Theatre
1990	Lovers Meeting	Joe Hession	Druid Theatre Company
1991	The Patriot Game	Pearse	Abbey Theatre
1991	The Wexford Trilogy: Belfry	Dominic	Bush Theatre
1992	Drama at Inish	Eddie Twohig	Abbey Theatre
1993	The Wexford Trilogy	Tony / Dominic	Abbey Theatre
1993	Marvin's Room	Hank	Hampstead Theatre
1993	Marvin's Room	Hank	Comedy Theatre
1994	The Playboy of the Western World	Christopher Mahon	Almeida Theatre
1995	Mojo	Skinny	Royal Court Theatre
2000	The Tempest	Ariel	Almeida Theatre
2001	Platonov	Platonov	Almeida Theatre
2003	The Caretaker	Mick	Roundabout Theatre
2005	Someone Who'll Watch Over Me	Edward	New Ambassadors Theatre
2007	American Buffalo	Teach	Gate Theatre
2007	Glengarry Glen Ross	Richard Roma	Apollo Theatre
2015	The Dead		Sam Wanamaker Playhouse
2021–22	Faith Healer	Frank Hardy	Abbey Theatre

== Radio appearances ==
Year	Title	Notes
2013	The Last Tycoon	BBC Radio 4

== Awards and nominations ==
Year	Work	Award	Result
2000	Queer as Folk	British Academy Television Award for Best Actor	Nominated
2000	The Low Down	Edinburgh International Film Festival for Best British Newcomer	Won
2004	The Caretaker	Drama Desk Award for Outstanding Featured Actor in a Play	Nominated
2004	The Caretaker	Outer Critics Circle Award for Outstanding Featured Actor in a Play	Nominated
2004	The Caretaker	Tony Award for Best Featured Actor in a Play	Nominated
2008	American Buffalo	Irish Theatre Award for Best Actor	Nominated
2009	The Wire	Irish Film and Television Award for Actor in a Lead Role Television	Won
2010	Treacle Jr.	British Independent Film Award for Best Performance by an Actor	Nominated
2011	Treacle Jr.	Milan International Film Festival Award for Best Actor	Won
2012	Love/Hate	Irish Film and Television Award for Actor in a Lead Role Television	Won
2012	Game of Thrones	Irish Film and Television Award for Actor in a Supporting Role Television	Nominated
2012	Game of Thrones	Screen Actors Guild Award for Outstanding Performance by an Ensemble in a Drama Series	Nominated
2014	Game of Thrones	Irish Film and Television Award for Actor in a Supporting Role Television	Nominated
2015	Charlie	Irish Film and Television Award for Actor in a Lead Role Television	Won
2015	Game of Thrones	Empire Hero Award	Won
2016	Game of Thrones	Screen Actors Guild Award for Outstanding Performance by an Ensemble in a Drama Series	Nominated
2016	Maze Runner: The Scorch Trials	Teen Choice Award for Choice Movie Villain	Nominated
2017	Quantum Break	NAVGTR Award for Supporting Performance in a Drama	Won
2018	Maze Runner: The Death Cure	Teen Choice Award for Choice Movie Villain	Nominated
