= On the Couch (Irish TV series) =

- Genre: Comedy Drama
- Created by: Barbara Bergin; Gary Cooke
- Written by: Barbara Bergin; Gary Cooke
- Directed by: Barbara Bergin
- Starring: Barbara Bergin; Gary Cooke
- Country of origin: Ireland
- Original language: English
- No. of series: 1
- No. of episodes: 6

Production
- Producer: Fiona Bergin
- Editor: Úna Ní Dhonghaíle
- Camera setup: PJ Dillon
- Running time: 22 minutes
- Production company: Fubar Films

Original release
- Network: TV3
- Release: 12 February – 9 April 2013

On the Couch is an Irish comedy-drama, produced by Fubar Films and screened on TV3. The series, created and performed by Barbara Bergin and Gary Cooke, premiered on Tuesday 12 February 2013. It follows three different couples embarking on therapy for the first time - Sylvia and Dudley, Carmel and Brendan, Graeme and Moya. The series is produced by Fiona Bergin and directed by Barbara Bergin .

== Plot ==
Dudley Gibbons hopes therapy will force his formidable wife Sylvia to "move on" from his mindless affair with an 18-year-old employee. Carmel Curtin hopes to discover why her massive weight loss has failed to reignite husband Brendan's sex drive and high-flyers Graeme and Moya de Paor-Cullen talk about why their parenting skills have landed them in court. Before the end of the first session everyone has already got more than they bargained for. Sex, parenthood, trust, money, fear, ambition, food, negligence, disappointment and fidelity are just some of the issues that raise their head.

== Tagline ==
Watch it, laugh, weep and be glad it's not you.

== Cast ==
- Barbara Bergin as Sylvia/Carmel/Moya
- Gary Cooke as Dudley/Brendan/Graeme

== Production ==
On the Couch is TV3's first original comedy series. It is made with the support of the Broadcasting Authority of Ireland's Sound and Vision Fund. In an interview with Doug Whelan of TV Now Barbara Bergin talks about the audience taking on the role of the therapist. "You can put your characters under pressure that way," she says "by keeping the focus on them. They are never off the rack, so to speak. It’s about the awkward situations they’re in and how they deal with them. It’s got a lot of heart, but it can be quite dark. You might call it tragic-comedy." In the same interview Gary Cooke, best known for his role in Après Match adds "The hope in writing for yourself is that you can get to places quicker by kicking ideas around and trying them out as you’re going. When you’re working with loads of departments – writers, directors, producers and so on – it can get diluted very quickly. This way you can create things on the spot and mould them as you go, rather than working through the layers." Bergin agrees "It’s very rare that there aren’t obstacles, but it didn’t feel like a hard road because in the beginning we were just playing around to see if we could bring our ideas to fruition. Our comfort in performing together definitely helped during that phase; the way things are done sometimes, if there had been more people involved the idea would have been pulled apart before it was fully formed but we were able to take our time and bring these couples to life. It’s great to have that dynamic, and be able to gauge what the other person is doing and where they want to go with an idea."

== Reception ==
Writing in The Irish Times Bernice Harrison said "New Irish comedy. Now there are three words to make your blood run cold. But On the Couch is funny – and not in a good-for-an-Irish-comedy sort of way but properly funny. Each story is rich with blackly comic potential. The acting is spot on, especially from Bergin, who is a terrific character actor, and the writing is subtle enough that by the end of the first episode the dynamics between the couples have shifted – and look set to shift again next week. You mightn’t recognise everything in all the characters, but they seem very real all the same."

In The Sunday Times Liam Fay describes the series as "a gleefully bitchy two-hander. The dialogue is studded with elaborate social detail but the performances steal the show: one character’s reaction is just as important as the lines delivered by the other. All six characters seethe with disapproval of their other halves. However, they become inflamed with even greater rage whenever they recall a third party’s criticism of their choice of mate. Here, Bergin and Cooke succeed in mining comedic gold from an often over-looked universal truth: people take proprietorial pride in their partners, even those they wish would become ex-partners. To admit that a spouse is a dud is publicly to admit wasting time and a shameful lapse in judgment. There is no more painful property trap than the one for which you fell with your eyes wide open.". In the RTÉ Guide Michael Doherty described the series as "observational humour of the highest quality", while Pat Stacey in The Evening Herald called it "a very satisfying maiden voyage into uncharted and, in terms of Irish television's track record, notoriously treacherous waters for the commercial channel. It’s funny and well observed."

== Episodes ==
No.	Title	Directed by	Written by	Original release date
1	"In Denial"	Barbara Bergin	Barbara Bergin & Gary Cooke	12 February 2013
Three couples begin couples therapy. Cheating, sex and parenting are among the issues as everyone gets more than they bargained for.
2	"A Can of Worms"	Barbara Bergin	Barbara Bergin & Gary Cooke	19 February 2013
Brendan blames Carmel’s meddling best friend for their marriage woes. Moya and Graeme blame their child-minders for chaos at home and Dudley is forced to take the blame for his mindless affair.
3	"Fight or Flight"	Barbara Bergin	Barbara Bergin & Gary Cooke	5 March 2013
Sylvia’s reaction to Dudley’s tears has surprising consequences. Brendan believes he’s winning the battle for Carmel when she moves home. Graeme and Moya are forced to remain in therapy thanks to a court order.
4	"Second Honeymoon"	Barbara Bergin	Barbara Bergin & Gary Cooke	12 March 2013
Carmel is ecstatic as Brendan gets more physical. Sylvia and Dudley are in the mood for love but Graeme and Moya are at each other’s throats as spending time at home takes its toll.
5	"Heart of Darkness"	Barbara Bergin	Barbara Bergin & Gary Cooke	2 April 2013
Brendan takes drastic measures to avoid sex with Carmel. Graeme and Moya are united in terror as Dargan’s court case looms and Sylvia finally forgives Dudley for the affair but he has an even bigger shock in store.
6	"The Labour Of Love"	Barbara Bergin	Barbara Bergin & Gary Cooke	9 April 2013
The three couples come to the end of their respective therapy sessions - but are they any the wiser for it?

== Music ==
The score for On the Couch is written by Peter Delaney.
