= Short Order =

2005 film by Anthony Byrne

Short Order - Life Is A Buffet!!!
- Promotional poster
- Directed by: Anthony Byrne
- Written by: Anthony Byrne
- Produced by: Christine Alderson; Patricia Barona; David Collins; Howard Gibbins; Stephen Smith; Brian Willis
- Starring: Emma de Caunes; Rade Šerbedžija; Cosma Shiva Hagen; Jack Dee; Paul Kaye; Vanessa Redgrave; John Hurt; Tatiana Ouliankina
- Cinematography: Brendan Maguire
- Edited by: J. Patrick Duffner
- Music by: Niall Byrne
- Release date: 1 March 2005
- Running time: 100 minutes
- Countries: Ireland; United Kingdom; Germany; Monaco; Spain
- Languages: English, German, Spanish, Italian

Short Order is a 2005 Irish drama film written and directed by Anthony Byrne. It was released in Ireland on 1 March 2005. Later on during the Dinard Festival of British Cinema, it was released in France on 6 October 2005. It was released at Newport Beach International Film Festival on 26 April 2006, in the US and was later released as Life Is A Buffet on 16 May 2008. Spain saw the release at Seville Film Festival on 7 November 2006. The Germany release was on 25 October 2012. Some parts of the dialogues are versed in German, Spanish and Italian, during the course of the movie, interactions between the casts, etc. The film's primary language is English and some segments are in other languages.

== Plot ==
Fifi is a chef who receives frequent job offers. The film depicts the lives of the chefs, their perspective on their work, and their focus on food.

== Awards ==
The film has got 3 awards and has been nominated 7 times.

Won

- Irish Film and Television Awards in 2005 for Best Production Design for Film.
- Eleanor Wood and Laura Bowe won the award.

Nominated

- Tatiana Ouliankina - Best Supporting Actress in a Feature Film
- Anthony Byrne - Best Director
- Anthony Byrne - Best Script for Film
- Judith Williams - Best Costume Design for Film
- Niall Byrne - Best Music in a Film
- J. Patrick Duffner - Best Editing in Film/TV Drama
- Ray Cross, Nikki Moss, John Fitzgerald and Peter Blayney - Best Sound in Film/TV Drama

Won

- Monaco International Film Festival in 2006 for Best Newcomer (actress) and Best Actor.
- Cosma Shiva Hagen - Best Newcomer
- Rade Serbedzija - Best Actor

== Cast ==
The cast list is:

- Emma de Caunes as Fiona (Fifi Koko)
- Rade Šerbedžija as Paulo Federico
- Cosma Shiva Hagen as Catherine
- Jack Dee as Harry Melville
- Paul Kaye as Burt Stone, The Cable Show Guy
- Vanessa Redgrave as Marianne
- John Hurt as Felix
- Jon Polito as Tony
- Paschal Friel as Pedro
- Tatianna Ouliankina as Stephanie (Stefani)
- Vincent Fegan as Master Chef / Sebastian Gruel
- Frédéric Andrau
- Eamonn Hunt as Jerry
- Terrence Orr as Butler
- John Henry as Sinatra
- Tommy O'Neil as Dapper Gent
- Marc Copeland as Barman
- Frederic Andrau as Peirre
- Roger Gregg as Lenny Green

== Locations ==
Short Order was filmed mostly on sets in (tudio Bendestorf bei Hamburg, Bendestorf and Lower Saxony.

== Soundtracks ==
Track No.	Title	Writer and Music Composer	Performed By	Arranged By	Published By	Performance By	Courtesy(TM/C)
1.	You Are My Sunshine	Davis, Mitchell	Emma de Caunes	Niall Byrne	Peer Music Limited	Andy Williams	Sony BMG Music Limited
2.	Yummy Yummy Yummy	Arthur Resnick and Joey Levine	Emma de Caunes	Niall Byrne	TM Music Inc		Carlin Music Corp
3.	Ninety Nine And A Half (Won't Do)	Steve Cropper; Wilson Pickett Jr. Eddie Floyd	The Detroit Cobras		Pronto Music Inc; Warner-Tamerlane Publishing Corp. East Memphis Music; Irving Music Inc. Rondor Music Ltd.		Warner-Chappell Music Ltd
4.	Think About Your Troubles	Harry Nilsson	Emma de Caunes	Niall Byrne	Dunbar Music Inc. Six Continents Music Publishing Inc. Blackwood-Music Inc. Golden-Syrup-Music		Warner-Chappell Music Ltd
5.	Grazing In The Grass	Philemon M Hou, Harry Elston	The Friends Of Distinction		Mancur Street Music Ltd.		BMG Records
6.	Go-Ped	Rori Colman		Rori Colman			
7.	Short Order Baby	Emma de Caunes	Anthony Byrne; Niall Byrne				
