= All Aboard (TV series) =

- Genre: Children; Documentary
- Created by: Fintan Connolly; Fiona Bergin
- Country of origin: Ireland
- Original language: English
- No. of series: 1
- No. of episodes: 15

Production
- Producer: Fiona Bergin
- Running time: 6 minutes
- Production company: Fubar Films

Original release
- Network: RTÉjr
- Release: 26 March – 13 April 2018

All Aboard is an Irish documentary series, produced by Fubar Films and screened on RTÉjr. The series premiered on Monday 26 March 2018. It follows two sisters and their parents on a barge journey down the Grand Canal from Dublin to Shannon Harbour in Co. Offaly. The series is produced by Fiona Bergin and filmed and directed by Fintan Connolly.

== Plot ==
This 15 part family adventure is set on the beautiful barge ‘Tig Beatha’ as it drifts along the Grand Canal. Sisters Muireann (9) and Caoimhe (7) are the hosts along with their parents Mick and Trish. The family live in a floating home and make many stops on the way. Their journey takes them three weeks.

The family visits special places and tries out new activities: going through a lock, feeding swans, stencilling the name on the barge, visiting a fen, helping to clean up the canal, going out in a dinghy, looking for bats at night, getting pulled along by dray horses, meeting a lock keeper, cutting turf on the bog, aqua cycling, pony riding, going on a nature walk, catching butterflies and going fishing.

== Episodes ==
No.	Title	Director	Airdate
1	"Grand Canal Docks - Portobello"	Fintan Connolly	Monday 26 March 2018
Caoimhe and Muireann travel through the city to Portobello.
2	"Portobello - Hazelhatch"	Fintan Connolly	Tuesday 27 March 2018
Caoimhe and Muireann feed swans before leaving the city for the country.
3	"Hazelhatch - Henry Bridge"	Fintan Connolly	Wednesday 28 March 2018
Caoimhe and Muireann stencil the name Tig Beatha on their barge.
4	"Henry Bridge - Sallins"	Fintan Connolly	Thursday 29 March 2018
Caoimhe and Muireann visit a fen and look for little creatures.
5	"Sallins - Lowtown"	Fintan Connolly	Friday 30 March 2018
Caoimhe and Muireann help to clean up the canal.
6	"Lowtown - Littletown"	Fintan Connolly	Monday 2 April 2018
Caoimhe and Muireann go out in a dinghy
7	"Littletown - Allenwood"	Fintan Connolly	Tuesday 3 April 2018
Caoimhe and Muireann look for bats at night.
8	"Allenwood - Trimblestown"	Fintan Connolly	Wednesday 4 April 2018
Caoimhe and Muireann’s barge gets pulled along the canal by dray horses.
9	"Trimblestown - Rhode"	Fintan Connolly	Thursday 5 April 2018
Caoimhe and Muireann meet a lock keeper.
10	"Rhode - Killeen"	Fintan Connolly	Friday 6 April 2018
Caoimhe and Muireann cut turf on the bog.
11	"Killeen - Daingean"	Fintan Connolly	Monday 9 April 2018
Caoimhe and Muireann go aqua cycling, kayaking and zorbing on the canal.
12	"Daingean - Ballycommon"	Fintan Connolly	Tuesday 10 April 2018
Caoimhe and Muireann go pony riding for the first time.
13	"Ballycommon - Pollagh"	Fintan Connolly	Wednesday 11 April 2018
Caoimhe and Muireann go on a nature walk and catch butterflies.
14	"Pollagh - Belmont"	Fintan Connolly	Thursday 12 April 2018
Caoimhe and Muireann meet a fairy in the woods.
15	"Belmont - Shannon Harbour"	Fintan Connolly	Friday 13 April 2018
Caoimhe and Muireann go fishing and reach the end of their journey.

== Music ==
The score for All Aboard is written by Stephen Rennicks.
