= Michael Colgan (director) =

Irish film and television producer

- Born: 1950 (age 75–76); Dublin, Ireland
- Education: Trinity College Dublin
- Occupation: • Theatre director • film producer • television producer
- Spouse: Susan FitzGerald (1974–2010)
- Children: 3
- Writing career
- Genre: Theater
- Subject: Acting

Michael Colgan, OBE (born 1950) is an Irish film and television producer who is former director of the Gate Theatre in Dublin.

== Life ==
Born in Dublin in 1950, he was educated at Trinity College Dublin, where, as a student, he became chairman of Trinity Players. In 1983, he became director of the Gate Theatre and prior to this, he was a director at the Abbey Theatre, manager of the Irish Theatre Company and artistic director of the Dublin Theatre Festival.

In his 30 years at the Gate, he has produced many award-winning plays, including Salomé directed by Steven Berkoff, The Collection starring Harold Pinter, A Streetcar Named Desire starring Frances McDormand, The Home Place starring Tom Courtenay, Three Sisters starring the three Cusack sisters, and recently Faith Healer (which won a Tony Award when it toured to Broadway in 2006), starring Ralph Fiennes. He has also produced four Pinter Festivals and five Beckett festivals.

The first Beckett Festival was produced at the Gate in 1991, in which the theatre presented all nineteen of Samuel Beckett's stage plays in Dublin over a three-week period. This festival was presented again at the Lincoln Center, New York City in 1996 and at the Barbican Centre in London in 1999. In April 2006, to mark the centenary of Beckett's birth, the Gate produced a month-long festival which ran simultaneously in Dublin and at the Barbican in London and, in January 2007, presented the Beckett Season to acclaim at the Sydney Festival where Michael Colgan directed Ralph Fiennes in a stage adaptation of Beckett's novella First Love.

His productions of Beckett plays have also been seen in many cities throughout the world and at many festivals, from Chicago to Beijing and Melbourne to Toronto. The Pinter festivals were presented in Dublin in 1994 and 1997 with a major festival in New York in 2001. Most recently, in 2005, the Gate produced a festival to celebrate the writer's 80th birthday, part of which was subsequently seen in London and in Turin.

Alongside his work for the theatre, Michael Colgan is also a film producer. He is co-founder and executive director of Little Bird Productions, a film and television company, which produced Troubles, a major two-part drama for LWT in 1986. In 1993, he produced the RTÉ television series Two Lives.

In 1999, with Alan Moloney, he formed Blue Angel Films specifically to produce the Beckett on Film project in which all nineteen of Beckett's plays were filmed using internationally renowned directors and actors. The series won many awards including The South Bank Show award for Best Drama and, in the US, the prestigious Peabody Award. More recently, in 2006, he produced the film version of Harold Pinter's play Celebration for Channel 4 starring Michael Gambon and Colin Firth.

From 1989 to 1994, he was a member of the Arts Council of Ireland and he was Chairman of the St. Patrick's Festival from 1996 to 1999.

In 1996, he received the Eamonn Andrews Award for excellence in the National Entertainment Awards and in 1999 he won the People of the Year Award. In 1985 and 1987, he received the Sunday Independent Arts Award. In July 2000, he received the degree of Doctor in Laws (honoris causa) from Trinity College, Dublin. He was awarded the Irish Theatre Award for lifetime achievement in 2006 and, in 2007, was honoured with the title Chevalier dans l'Ordre des Arts et des Lettres by the French government and in 2010 he was presented with an honorary OBE from Queen Elizabeth II.

He has three children, Sarah, Sophie and Richard.

== Sexual harassment allegations (2017) ==
In November 2017, Colgan made Irish headlines after seven women who had worked at the Gate Theatre spoke to The Irish Times citing that they were sexually abused and harassed by Colgan while they were working in the theater. Colgan has since responded with a public apology for anyone who felt uncomfortable, although he has disputed the claims that are sexual in nature.

An independent investigation into allegations of inappropriate behaviour and abuse of power by Colgan began in November 2017 and recommendations were related in February 2018. The review was set up by the Gate Theatre in November 2017 following a series of allegations made by a multiple women working in the arts industry. The review found that he has 'a case to answer' for his actions towards several woman. The review received input from 56 individuals, including current and former employees and board members, and also freelancers. Face-to-face interviews, phone conversations and email and written submissions were conducted. "Many of the participants reported feeling they had "nowhere to go" and that feeling appeared to prevent them from invoking grievance procedures." The report also made 14 recommendations on how to make the Gate Theatre "a more positive and safe place in the future".

In January 2018, Colgan stated his intention to sue Village magazine for a defamation of character after it published an editorial on the matter concerning the allegations made towards Colgan.
