= Mickybo and Me =

- Directed by: Terry Loane
- Written by: Terry Loane
- Based on: Mojo Mickybo by Owen McCafferty
- Produced by: Mark Huffam; Michael McGeagh
- Starring: John Joe McNeill; Niall Wright; Julie Walters; Ciarán Hinds; Adrian Dunbar; Gina McKee
- Cinematography: Roman Osin
- Edited by: Scott Thomas
- Music by: Stephen Warbeck
- Production companies: StudioCanal; Working Title Films; Irish Film Board; Northern Ireland Film & Television Commission; WT^{2} Productions; Moving Picture Company
- Distributed by: Universal Pictures
- Release dates: August 2004 (Edinburgh); 25 March 2005 (Ireland and United Kingdom)
- Running time: 95 minutes
- Countries: Northern Ireland; United Kingdom
- Language: English
- Budget: $5 million
- Box office: £172,336

Mickybo and Me is a 2004 Northern Irish comedy-drama film written and directed by Terry Loane and based on the stage play Mojo Mickybo by Owen McCafferty. The film was produced by Working Title Films, and released by Universal Pictures.

== Plot ==
An eight and a nine-year-old boy living in Belfast during The Troubles, one Catholic, one Protestant, become friends. They are obsessed with the film Butch Cassidy and the Sundance Kid and dream of robbing banks and emigrating to Australia.

Although the boys are from completely different backgrounds, they bond quickly. After watching the film together, they take on the characters' personas. Later, believing that they will get blamed for an old man's death, they go 'on the run,' trying to escape to Australia.

Their journey towards the ferry (which they believe will carry them to Australia) is a series of misadventures, including a 'bank robbery', riding a horse/ponies, a fire in a stable, escape from a police car. Once re-apprehended by the police, they discover they had crossed the Irish border.

Upon their return, one of the boy's fathers is killed in a sectarian-related shooting, driving a wedge between them. In the closing scene, 30 years later, Mickeybo opens a large envelope from Jonjo, which contains the toy sheriff's star and a photo of him with his family living in Australia.

== Cast ==
- John Joe McNeill as Michael "Mickybo" Boyle
- Niall Wright as John "Jonjo" Wright
- Julie Walters as Mickybo's mother
- Ciarán Hinds as Jonjo's father
- Adrian Dunbar as Mickybo's father
- Gina McKee as Jonjo's mother
- Brendan Caskey as "Gank"
- Charlie Clarke as "Fartface"
- Michael McElhatton as the Mechanic

== Release ==
- Irish Film Festival of New Zealand
- Edinburgh International Film Festival, 2004

Ireland: Nationwide Cinema Release April 2005

== Awards ==
Wins

• Best Irish Film in Big Buzz Ireland Entertainment Awards 2005.
• Best Feature Film in the Boston Irish Film Festival 2005.
• Audience Award at the Schlingel International Children's Film Festival, Chemnitz, 2005.
• The CIFEJ Award for Best Film & Children's Jury Award for Best Film in the OULU International Film Festival 2005.
• Best Children's Film, Tiburon International Film Festival, USA, 2006.
• Grand Prix (International Jury) and Grand Prix (Children's Jury), Buster Film Festival, Copenhagen 2006.
• Best Director, Olympia International Youth Film Festival, 2006.
• Best Film, Olympia International Youth Film Festival, 2006.
• Audience Award - Best Film at the Titanic International Film Festival, Budapest 2007.
• Best Costume Design, Irish Film and Television Awards 2005

Nominations

- Shortlisted for the Michael Powell Award for Best British Film, Edinburgh International Film Festival, 2004.
- Best Film, Irish Film and Television Awards 2005
- Best Screenplay for Film, Irish Film and Television Awards 2005
- Breakthrough Talent, Terry Loane, Irish Film and Television Awards 2005
- Best Production Design for Film, Irish Film and Television Awards 2005
- Best Film, Austin Texas Film Festival 2005
