= Xtra-vision =

Video, film and music retailer in Ireland

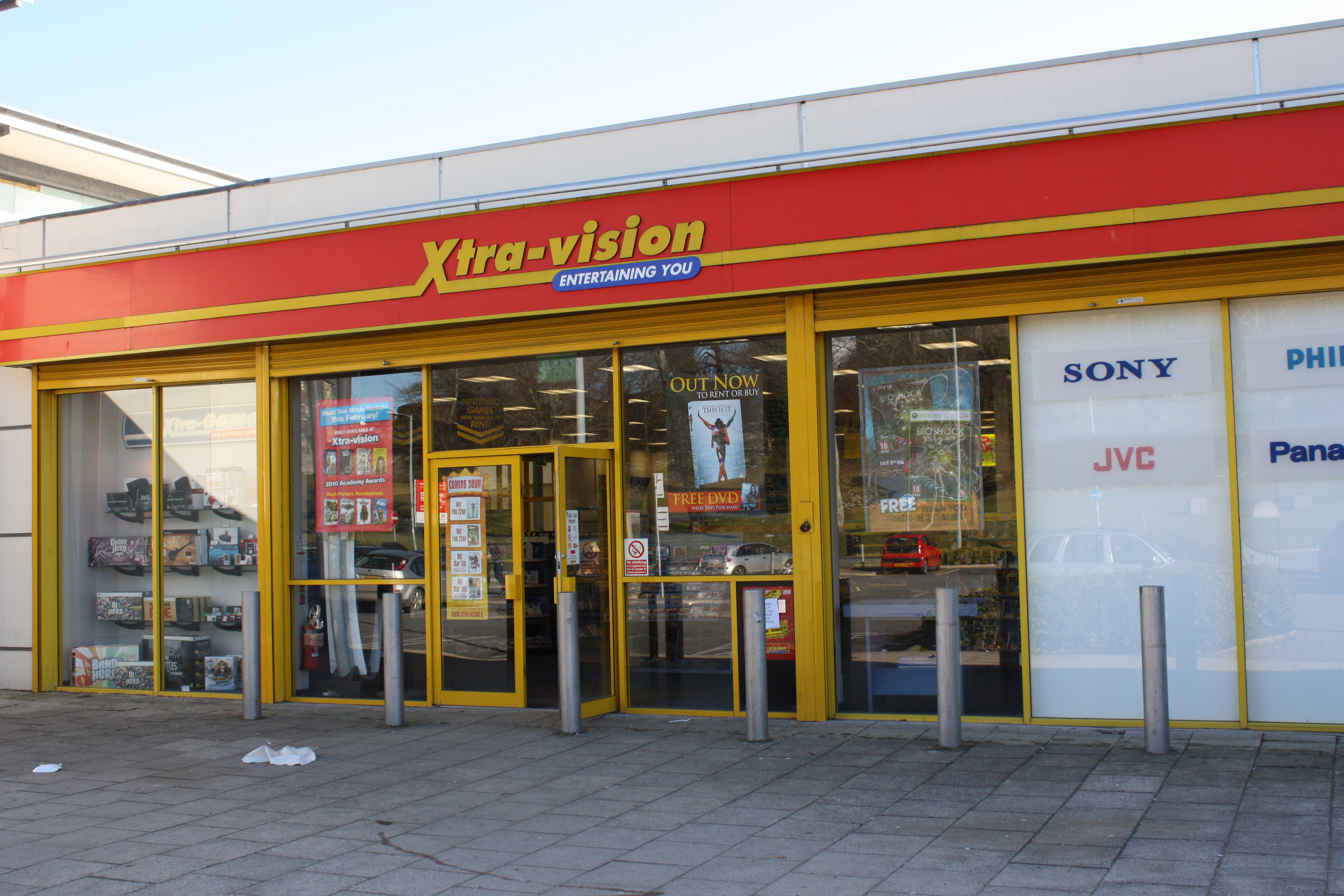
- Xtra-Vision, Downpatrick
- Type: Private
- Industry: Video rental
- Founded: 1979
- Founder: Richard Murphy
- Defunct: 2021
- Headquarters: Dublin, Ireland

Xtra-vision was a video, film and music retailer that operated across the island of Ireland. Founded in 1979, it had 200 shops at its peak before running into financial difficulties, changing ownership a number of times, and ultimately closing in 2021. All physical Xtra-vision stores closed across Ireland in January 2016.

== History ==
=== 1979–1993: founding, early history and receivership ===
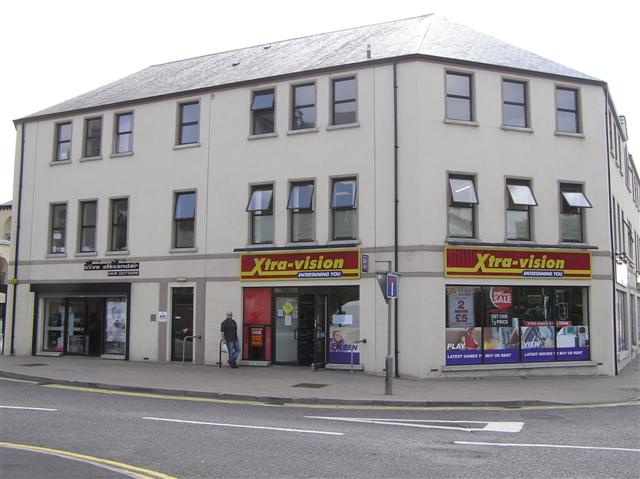
Xtra-Vision in Enniskillen

Xtra-vision was founded by Richard Murphy in 1979. At its peak, it operated over 200 shops across both the Republic of Ireland and Northern Ireland. Murphy later went on to form Chartbusters in 1993.

Xtra-vision went into financial difficulties in the early 1990s after aggressive expansion of their retail network caused a massive increase in their stock price on the Irish Stock Exchange, without sufficient liquidity to continue the network expansion, and their books having overestimated the value of their video stock in shops. The company entered examinership and its finances were turned around by businessman Peter O'Grady Walshe in 1993. The company was bought by a venture capital consortium in 1994, with O'Grady Walshe as managing director.

=== 1996–2009: Blockbuster era ===
In 1996, the company was sold to US giant Blockbuster. The chain never rebranded in Ireland, citing market research that the Xtra-vision name was better known and more respected than Blockbuster across the island. The few Xtra-vision shops outside Ireland — those in Manchester, London and New Hampshire, were rebranded to Blockbuster after the takeover.

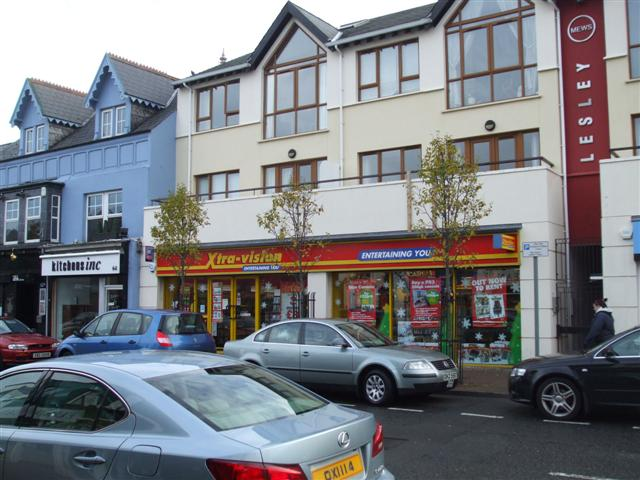
Xtra-Vision in Holywood

The company had an exclusive deal meaning that any movie with funding from the Irish Film Board would initially be provided for rental and sale solely through their network.

On 20 October 2009, as a promotion for the upcoming release of Halo 3: ODST, Xtra-vision ran a Halo 3 tournament, in which they held 2 categories, Teams and Doubles, Teams being a 4 player team and Doubles being a 2 player team, in which they would compete in an all Ireland tournament, the winners receiving a free copy of Halo 3: ODST. The campaign turned out a great success, boosting publicity for Xtra-vision and the release of Halo 3: ODST. The winners of the Teams being "Team Axios", a Halo team from County Mayo, and the winner of the Doubles being Dan Vaughan and Marcus Conaghey.

In August 2009, Blockbuster sold its Irish operations to Birchhall Investments.

=== 2011–2016: continued financial struggles and liquidation ===
In May 2011, the company went into examinership but successfully exited in August.

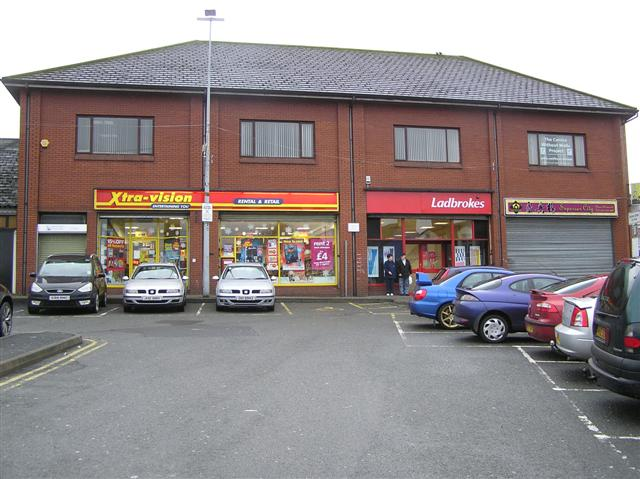
Xtra-Vision in Strabane

On 29 April 2013, the company announced that it was to enter receivership with Luke Charleton and Colin Farquharson, of Ernst & Young. On 7 May 2013, the receivers announced that 20 shops would close throughout Ireland with a loss of up to 120 jobs. These outlets were closed due to trading losses because of fall in revenue. Xtra-vision was sold to Hilco Capital Ireland in June 2013 for an undisclosed sum.

When the Xbox One was released in November 2013, Xtra-vision gained negative media attention due to their policy of forcing customers who had pre-ordered the console to purchase an additional game in order to get their console. After media attention and backlash on social media websites, Ireland's National Consumer Agency launched an investigation into Xtra-vision's practices. Xtra-vision reversed this policy, and announced that refunds were available for those who had purchased an additional game with their pre-ordered console.

On 30 August 2013, Hilco announced that 26 Xtra-Vision shops would be dual-branded as HMV/Xtra-Vision).

On 27 January 2016, the High Court appointed a provisional liquidator to Xtra-Vision after the company became insolvent and unable to pay their debts, with most of the 580 jobs expected to be lost.

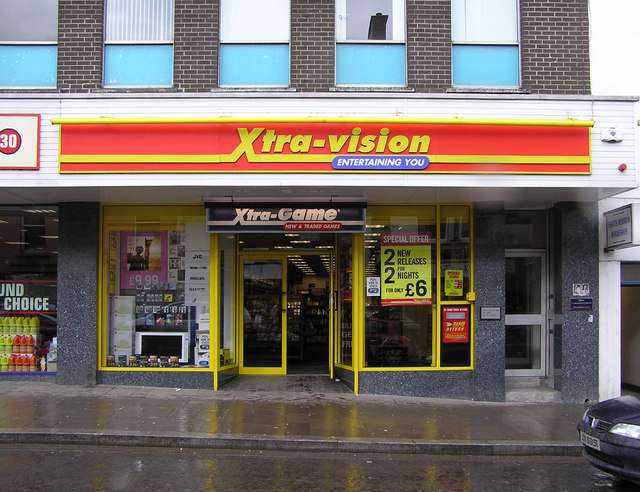
Xtra-Vision in Omagh

=== 2016–2024: attempts to pivot and relaunch ===
The company thereafter operated as an online business, selling movies, video games and electronics, and also operated vending machines (branded as Xtra-Vision Xpress) for renting movies and video games in SuperValu supermarkets, petrol stations and shopping centres. New movies were added every Friday. The customer selected the item they wished to rent and paid by debit/credit card. No subscription was required, but an e-mail address had to be provided if a receipt was desired. The item had to be returned by 8pm on the return date (between 1–3 nights depending on amount of discs rented). If not returned, the fee was €1.50 daily, up to a maximum of 10 days (€15). After 10 days, the disc was the customer's to keep.

On 7 July 2021, Xtra-Vision Xpress was placed into voluntary liquidation and the business was closed.

On 15 May 2024, Reuben May bought the Xtra-Vision brand and was granted a trademark on 31 October 2024. Plans were in the works to create a new business model for the once iconic brand and launch Irelands first dedicated Esports gaming lounge in early 2025 but nothing came to it with the relaunched Xtra-vision website going offline again.
