= List of Stuckist artists =

Stuckism is an international anti-conceptual art and pro-figurative painting art movement founded by Charles Thomson and Billy Childish in 1999. The founding group in London had 13 members. In 2000, Regan Tamanui started a group in Melbourne, Australia, and it was decided that other artists should be free to start their own groups also, named after their locality. Stuckism has since grown into an international art movement of 230 groups in 52 countries, as of April 2012. This is a list of associated artists who, unless otherwise indicated, are painters.

Name	Group	Country	Joined	Left	Notes
Billy Childish	Stuckists	UK	1999	2001	CFS
Charles Thomson	Stuckists	UK	1999		CFS, PV
Philip Absolon	Stuckists	UK	1999		MS, PV
Frances Castle	Stuckists	UK	1999	2002	MS, PV
Sheila Clark	Stuckists	UK	1999		MS
Eamon Everall	Stuckists	UK	1999		MS, PV
Ella Guru	Stuckists	UK	1999		MS, PV
Wolf Howard	Stuckists	UK	1999	2006	MS, PV
Bill Lewis	Stuckists	UK	1999		MS, PV
Sanchia Lewis	Stuckists	UK	1999		MS
Joe Machine	Stuckists	UK	1999		MS, PV
Sexton Ming	Stuckists	UK	1999	2005	MS, PV
Charles Williams	Stuckists	UK	1999		MS, PV
Dawn Clarke	Belfast	UK	2008		F
Dan Belton	Brighton	UK	2001		F, PV
Guy Denning	Bristol	UK	2004	2011	F
Udaiyan	Cambridge	UK	2003		F
Jacqueline Jones	Cardiff	UK	2004		F
Peter Murphy	East Kent	UK	2005		F
Arfius Arf	Liverpool (St Helens)	UK	2006		F
Anne Forte	Edinburgh	UK	2004		F
Peter McArdle	Gateshead	UK	2003	2008	F, PV
Leo Goatley	Gloucester	UK	2005		F
Naive John	Liverpool	UK	2004		F, PV
Jasmine Maddock	Liverpool (Merseyside)	UK	2005		F
Andrew Galbraith	Liverpool (Waterloo)	UK	2006		F
Amanda Macgregor	Loanhead	UK	2006		F
Jane Kelly	London (Acton)	UK	2003		F, PV
Stephen Howarth	London (Balham)	UK	2004		F, PV
Alexis Hunter	London (Camden)	UK	2008		F
Annie Zamero	London (Crouch End)	UK	2002		F
Edgeworth Johnstone	London (Other Muswell Hill)	UK	2006		F
Piers Butler	London (Notting Hill)	UK	2003	2003	F
Angela Edwards	London (Notting Hill)	UK	2006	2006	F
Abby Jackson	London (Oval)	UK	2005		F
Stella Vine	London (Westminster)	UK	2001	2001	F
Rémy Noë	Maidstone	UK	2001		F, PV
Paul Harvey	Newcastle	UK	2001		F, PV
Rachel Jordan	North Kent	UK	2000		M, PV
Mark D	Nottingham	UK	2006		F
Daniel Pincham-Phipps	Southend	UK	2001		F, PV
Gina Bold	Student	UK	2002	2003	M, then GA
Steven Coots	Tunbridge Wells	UK	2005		F, PV
John Bourne	Wrexham	UK	2001		CF, PV
Elfyn Jones	Wrexham	UK	2001		CF
Jonathon Coudrille	Lizard	UK	2011		M, PV
Mandy McCartin	–	UK			GA, PV
Alex Forster Cabròn	Vienna	Austria	2005		F
Godfrey Blow	Perth	Australia	2003		F, PV
Regan Tamanui	Melbourne	Australia	2000		F
Cedric Lenaers	Bruges	Belgium	2009		F
Monica Bez Blatter	Rio de Janeiro	Brazil	2002		F
Iracema Brochado	Stuckafé Brasil	Brazil	2001		F
Pavel Lefterov	Sofia	Bulgaria	2011		F
David Wilson	White Rock	Canada	2008		F
Carlos Camus	Chilean	Chile	2001		F
Shelley Li	Shanghai	China	2009		F
Lucia Chaves	Bogota	Colombia	2005		F
Gustavo Alvarez	Medellin	Colombia	2005		F
Jane Dunn	Bohemia	Czech	2006		F
Robert Janás	Prague	Czech	2004		F, photographer
Jiří Hauschka	Prague	Czech	2005		M
Markéta Urbanová	Prague	Czech	2010		M
Jaroslav Valečka	Prague	Czech	2004		M
Filip Kudrnáč	Prague	Czech	2004		M
Kateřina Pažoutová	Prague	Czech	2004		M
Martin Salajka	Prague	Czech	2004		M
Jan Spěváček	Prague	Czech	2004		M
Jaromír 99	Prague	Czech	2010		M
Kip Bauersfeld	Prague 7	Czech	2005		F
Carl Frederik Waage Beck	Copenhagen	Denmark	2010		F
John Geggie	Danish	Denmark	2001		F
Hoek Regenbot	Kankaanpää	Finland	2006		F
Elsa Dax	Paris	France	2001		F, PV
Dimitri Likissas	St Martin FWI	French West Indies	2004		F
Sophie Kilasonia	Tbilisi	Georgia	2006		CF
Levan Mindiashvili	Tbilisi	Georgia	2006		CF
Ian Stenhouse	Berlin	Germany	2008		F
Peter Klint	Hamburg and Sylt	Germany	2002		F
Christian Malsch	Goettingen	Germany	2005		F, photographer
Mary Von Stockhausen	Lewenhagen	Germany			F, PV
Frank Schroeder	Munich	Germany	2002		F
Meral Ismail	Stuttgart	Germany	2005		F
Odysseus Yakoumakis	Athens	Greece	2004		F
Sheona Josiah	Georgetown	Guyana	2011		F
Leyton Rowley	Arnhem	Netherlands	2004		F
Arthur X	Delft	Netherlands	2004		F
Fons Bloemen	Limburg	Netherlands	2008		F
Smeetha Boumik	Mumbai	India	2006		F
Joko Apridinoto	Yogyakarta	Indonesia	2007		M
Kenny Hickey	Dublin	Ireland	2001		F
Samantha Keil	Tuscany	Italy	2008		F
Mafa Bamba	Abidgan	Ivory Coast	2001		F
Yuri Figini	Beppu	Japan	2009		F
Roberto Greene	Jersey	Jersey	2002		F
Fady Chamaa	Beirut	Lebanon	2009		F
Rene Trujillo	Mexico City	Mexico	2006		F
Alfredo Noyola	Monterrey	Mexico	2008		F
Zoran Zivkovic	Podgorica	Montenegro	2005		F
Mike Mayhew	Christchurch	New Zealand	2005		F
Asim Butt	Karachi	Pakistan	2005	2010 (died)	F
Sheherbano Husain	Karachi	Pakistan	2011		F
Gabriel Darvasi	Lima	Peru	2008		F
Przemyslaw Matecki	Żagań	Poland	2003		F
Jaime Braz	Lisbon	Portugal	2004		F
Elena Kartintseva	Moscow	Russia	2008		F
Igor	St Petersburg	Russia	2006		F
Vladislav Scepanovic	Belgrade	Serbia	2007		F
Maximillian Nikolajevitch	Kraljevo	Serbia	2007		F
Peter Takac	Slovak	Slovakia	2006		F
Alfons Freire	Barcelona	Spain	2006		F
Cesar Aguilar Gazquez	Catalonia	Spain	2007		F
Mariano Casas	Galicia Hartista	Spain	2008		CF
Carmen Martín	Galicia Hartista	Spain	2008		CF
Miguel-Anxo Varela	Galicia Hartista	Spain	2008		CF
Felix Nieto Raya	Madrid	Spain	2004		F
Eli Shaw	Malaga	Spain	2008		F
Esther Andicoberry	Seville	Spain	2001		F
Torbjorn Larsson	Orebro	Sweden	2006		CF
Puck Thyen	Orebro	Sweden	2006		CF
Kristina Bäck	Stockholm	Sweden	2002		F
Joel Sassoon	Zurich	Switzerland	2009		F
Michael Dickinson	Istanbul	Turkey	2004		F, collagist
Oxana Bondar	Kyiv	Ukraine	2009		F
Vanessa Rossetto	Austin	United States	2003		F
Jeffrey Scott Holland	Central Kentucky	USA	2001		F
Jesse Todd Dockery	Central Kentucky	USA	2001		M, PV
Richard J Cronborg	Chicago	USA	2001		F
Tony Juliano	Connecticut	USA	2002		F, PV
Don Lawler	Kentucky Mooleyville	USA	2005		CF, sculptor
Meg White	Kentucky Mooleyville	USA	2005		CF, sculptor
Nick Christos	Miami	USA	2009		F
Floyd Anthony Alsbach	Missouri Valley	USA	2008		F
Jesse Richards	New Haven	USA	2001	2006	CF, PV
Nicholas Watson	New Haven	USA	2001		CF
Terry Marks	New York	USA	2001		F, PV
Nick Treadway	Orange County of California	USA	2007		F
AnneMarie Gund	Edinburgh Lawrence	UK USA	1999	2005	MS
Susan Constanse	Pittsburgh	USA	2000		F
Peggy Clydesdale	Reno	USA	2006		F
Kim Richardson	St Louis Missouri	USA	2004		F
Frank Kozik	San Francisco	USA	2003		F
Brett Hamil	Seattle	USA	2001		CF
Jeremy Puma	Seattle	USA	2001		CF
Herndon Allen	Tulsa	USA	2006		F
Rebekah Maybury	Underage	International	2006		F
Liv Soul	Underage	International	2006		F

== Key ==
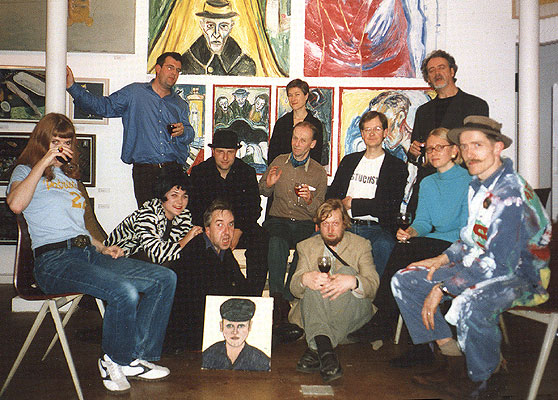
The first Stuckist group, founded in 1999.

- CFS = Co-founder of the first Stuckist group
- MS = Member of the first Stuckist group
- F = Founder of the named group
- CF = Co-founder of the named group
- M = Member of the named group
- GA = Guest artist
- PV = Represented in The Stuckists Punk Victorian show
- Student = Student for the first Stuckist group
- For groups in London and Liverpool, the name of the group is in brackets.
