= Sir Nicholas Serota Makes an Acquisitions Decision =

2000 painting by Charles Thomson

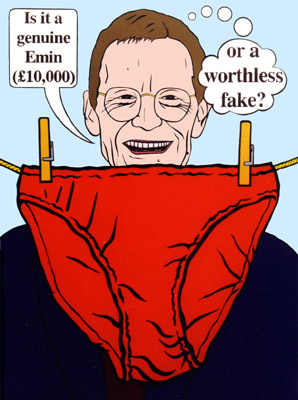
- Artist: Charles Thomson
- Year: 2000
- Type: Oil and acrylic on canvas
- Dimensions: 101.6 cm × 76.2 cm (40 in × 30 in)

Sir Nicholas Serota Makes an Acquisitions Decision is one of the paintings that was made as a part of the Stuckism art movement, and is recognized as a "signature piece" for the movement. It was painted in 2000 by the Stuckism co-founder Charles Thomson, and has been exhibited in a number of shows since, as well as being featured on placards during Stuckist demonstrations against the Turner Prize.

It depicts Sir Nicholas Serota, Director of the Tate Gallery, and chairman of the Turner Prize jury. "Emin" satirises Young British Artist Tracey Emin's installation My Bed, consisting of her bed and objects, including knickers, which she exhibited in 1999 as a Turner Prize nominee.

== Background and description ==
In 1999, Thomson was the co-founder, with Billy Childish of the Stuckism art group, which set out to promote figurative painting, in opposition to conceptual art, which they identified with the Turner Prize (whose jury chairman was Sir Nicholas Serota) and the Young British Artists, of which Tracey Emin (who had once been in a relationship with Childish) was a leading representative.

Thomson's painting shows Serota, the director of the Tate gallery. He is smiling behind a large pair of red knickers on a washing line, saying "is it a genuine Emin (£10,000)" and thinking, "or a worthless fake?". This is a reference to Tracey Emin's My Bed, literally a display of her (dishevelled) bed with detritus which included a pair of her knickers, shown in the 1999 Turner Prize at Tate Britain. The image was painted over a few days and in a final 24-hour non-stop stint.

== Shows ==
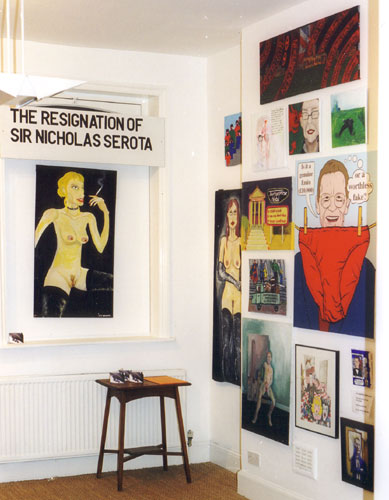
The first exhibition of the painting at Gallery 108, London, in 2000.

The painting was first exhibited in March 2000 at Joe Crompton's Gallery 108, Leonard Street, Shoreditch, London as the highlight of the third Stuckist show, The Resignation of Sir Nicholas Serota, which included a display of paintings about Serota. A small black-and-white image appeared in the Daily Telegraph. It was displayed again in the Stuckists Real Turner Prize Show later in the year. Richard Dean wrote:

Thomson has painted what must be the masterpiece of Stuckism so far: Sir Nicholas Serota Makes an Acquisitions Decision. Here the slick handling and smartass irony of Britart are turned on its champion to make a very funny point and a rather good portrait. This is an example of what the Situationists called detournement, using your enemies' own weapons against him.

The painting was included in the show catalogue, a signed copy of which was left at the Tate for Serota by Thomson and Billy Childish, the co-founder of the Stuckists. Artist Ranko Bon described greeting Serota at the opening of that year's Turner Prize at Tate Britain:

"Ah," I grabbed him by his bony shoulders, "when I look at you like this, I cannot but see Charles Thomson's portrait of you, which I saw last night at The Real Turner Prize Show in Shoreditch." I emphasized the word "real" with all my might. "Yes," Nick beamed back at me without even blinking, "I must see it!"

It was exhibited in summer 2002 during The First Stuckist International, the inaugural show at Thomson's Stuckism International Gallery (which closed in 2005). Sarah Kent (a staunch advocate of Britart) said: "One might forgive his puerile humour if Thomson didn't consider it a serious weapon ... cut the ranting and Thomson could be a reasonable painter." Thomson pointed out in response, "it's reality. A few weeks after I did the painting, Tracey Emin was shown on TV getting very angry about an installation because someone had substituted another pair of knickers for hers ... That makes it a bit sad."

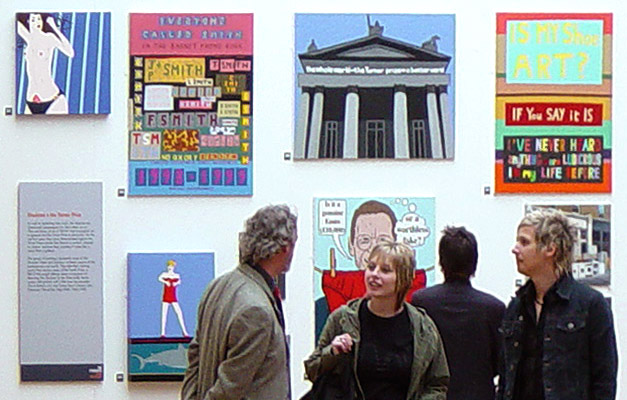
The Stuckists Punk Victorian at the Walker Art Gallery, 2004

The painting was also shown at the 2004 Liverpool Biennial in The Stuckists Punk Victorian show at the Walker Art Gallery. Serota went to the show and commented that it was "lively", while standing next to Thomson's painting of him. John Russell Taylor started his review of the Biennial in The Times, "Say what you will about the Stuckists, they certainly know what they don’t like. In the eccentric British group’s latest show the most explicit target is clearly the Turner Prize: the attitude can be summed up in one painting, Charles Thomson’s Sir Nicholas Serota Makes an Acquisitions Decision". 160 paintings from the show were offered as a donation to the Tate, including Thomson's painting of Serota, but "not surprisingly" rejected by Serota, who said, "We do not feel that the work is of sufficient quality in terms of accomplishment, innovation or originality of thought to warrant preservation in perpetuity in the national collection."

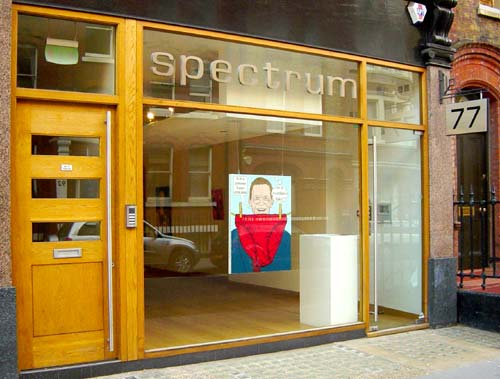
The Stuckist Go West show at Spectrum London, 2006.

The painting was the centrepiece at Spectrum London gallery in September 2006 in the Go West exhibition and priced at £30,000. The show at Spectrum London was the Stuckists' first show in a commercial gallery in the West End of London. The Spectrum London director, Royden Prior, said people shouldn't just look at the politics, but should look beyond them because "These artists are good, and are part of art history," Jane Morris wrote in The Guardian, "If the stuckists go down in art history, and the jury is still out as to whether they will, Sir Nicholas Serota Makes an Acquisitions Decision by stuckist co-founder Charles Thomson may well become their signature piece." The Evening Standard said some people would see the display of the painting as revenge against Serota, after he had rejected the Stuckists' offer to donate work to the Tate; it also mentioned that the Stuckists had first drawn attention to the Tate's purchase of The Upper Room by Chris Ofili, a Tate trustee, which had led to the Tate being censured by the Charity Commission in 2006.

== General election ==
In 2001 Thomson stood in the general election as the Stuckist Candidate. His opponent was Chris Smith, the then Culture Minister. Thomson adopted the painting of Sir Nicholas Serota and the knickers as the official logo of his party. He said "I can't see how the Electoral Commission would find it offensive. The real thing is on display at Tate Modern. What's more her knickers were funded by Chris Smith using public money."

== Demonstrations ==
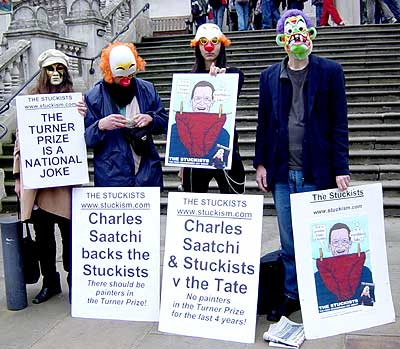
Stuckist protest against the Turner Prize, Tate Britain, in 2004.

The painting was used on one of the placards, when the Stuckists staged a protest at the unveiling of Rachel Whiteread's sculpture, Untitled Monument, in Trafalgar Square on 4 June 2001. Serota remonstrated with Thomson and told him the demonstration was a "cheap shot".

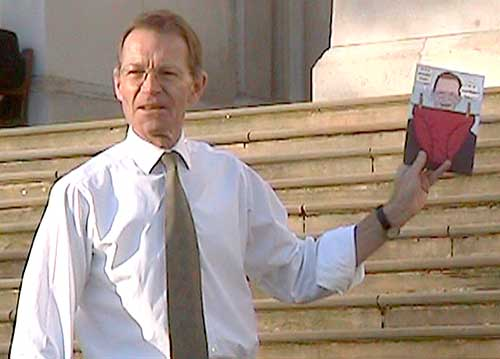
Sir Nicholas Serota holds up a postcard of the painting in 2006.

The image has also been used on posters in Stuckist demonstrations which were held outside the Turner Prize at Tate Britain 2000–2006. Photographs such as the one shown are used on the Stuckist web site to promote and record the demonstration.

In December 2006, during the Stuckists' demonstration, Thomson handed Serota a leaflet with the painting on it. This incident was caught by a freelance photographer, Rick Friend, on video, which was put on the Stuckism web site, along with the still image from it shown here. Serota stood on the steps of the Tate and held up the postcard, saying, "Can't you make another image?"

== Reception ==
Stella Vine. Hi Paul Can You Come Over.

Serota was described as being relatively unfazed by the message of Acquisitions Decision. He later visited the Stuckists' Punk Victorian show and conversed amicably with members, but ended his visit by rejecting an offered donation of their work as lacking "sufficient quality in terms of accomplishment, innovation or originality of thought to warrant preservation in perpetuity in the national collection"

Writer Paul Vallely defended Serota from Stuckist campaigns, criticizing the movement's anti-conceptualism for its association with "forces of social reaction" such as the Daily Mail and upholding Serota as the "greatest single champion of modern art in Britain". Vallely stated that while "I did smile" at Acquisitions Decision, he equally admired Serota's "cool response to the Stuckist détournement".

== Influence ==
Thomson has said that his painting was the idea that Stella Vine used for her painting of Princess Diana, Hi Paul Can You Come Over, that launched her to fame when it was bought by Charles Saatchi in 2004. Three years before, she had been a member of the Stuckist group and also briefly married to Thomson, who said that she was aware of the media appeal of the idea, as he had shown her press cuttings of the painting.

He said that she had not previously done a painting in that way and that "Her painting of Princess Diana was based on the same idea as my painting Sir Nicholas Serota Makes an Acquisitions Decision — namely to imagine what a famous person is thinking and write the words next to a portrait of them. She has made an intelligent, innovative and personal interpretation of influences to form her own identity, which is what all artists do. It is only fair and honest to acknowledge there was this help and there has been an influence." Vine refutes the idea that Thomson and the Stuckists had any role to play in her development, citing her inspiration instead as Sophie von Hellermann, Elizabeth Peyton, Anna Bjerger, Karen Kilimnik and Paul Housley

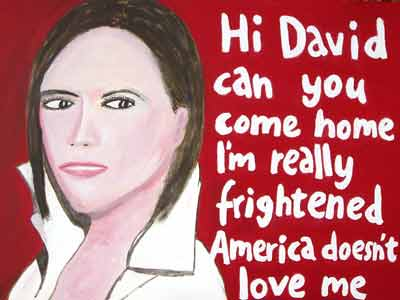
Mark D. Victoria Beckham: America Doesn't Love Me.

Thomson also drew a comparison between his and Vine's painting and a later work, Break Art Free, by Gina Bold: "You can't deny there's a connection between those works, but they are all also works with a strong individual identity. You certainly wouldn't say it’s plagiarism, but they spring from the same underlying idea." Mark D in turn made a satirical version of Vine's painting, substituting Victoria Beckham for Princess Diana.

== Gallery ==
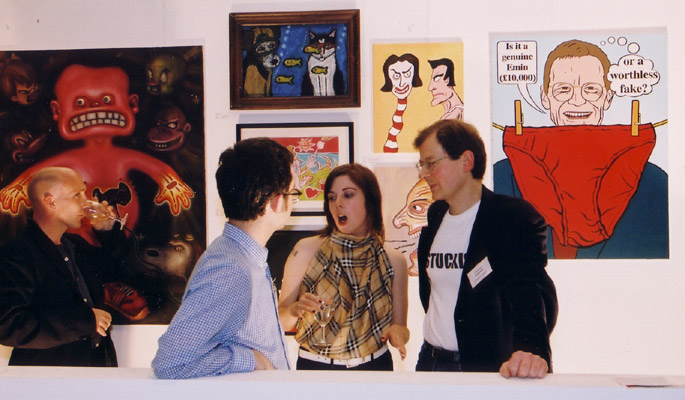
The Real Turner Prize Show, Pure Gallery, Shoreditch, London, 2000.

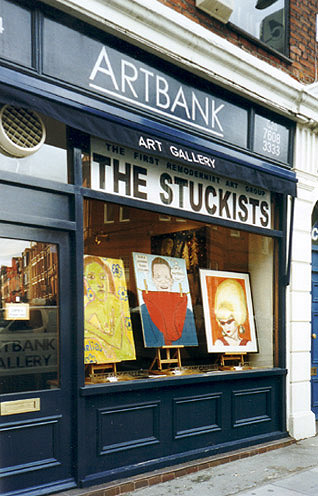
Artbank gallery, Clerkenwell, London, 2001.

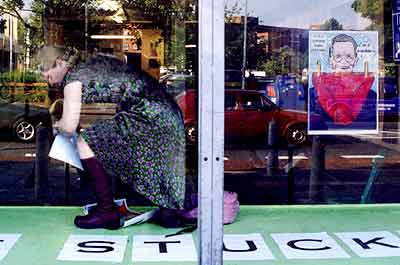
Fridge Gallery, Brixton, London, 2001. Stella Vine makes a window display.

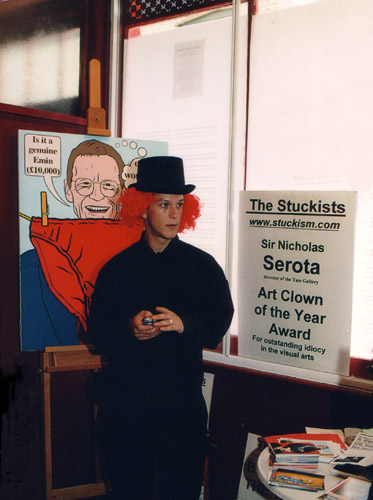
The First Stuckist International, Stuckism International Gallery, Shoreditch, London, 2002.

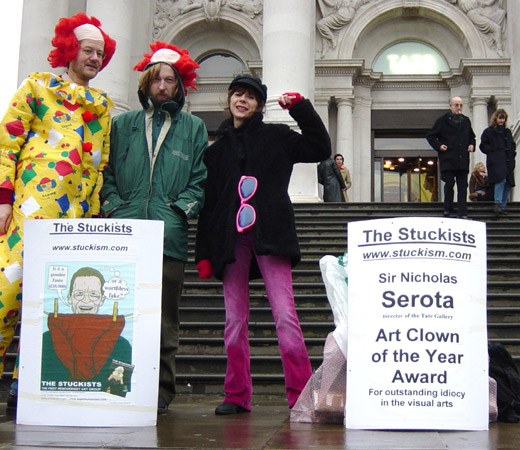
Stuckist demonstration against the Turner Prize, Tate Britain, 2002.

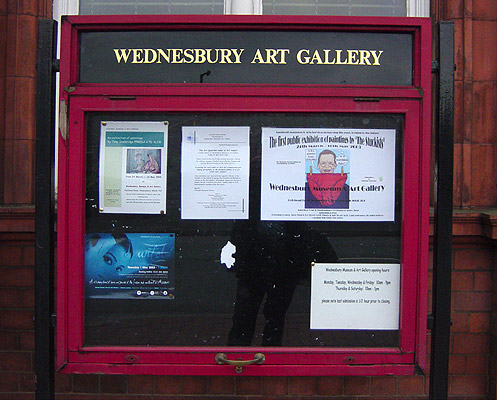
Stuck in Wednesbury, Wednesbury Museum and Art Gallery, Wednesbury, West Midlands, 2003.

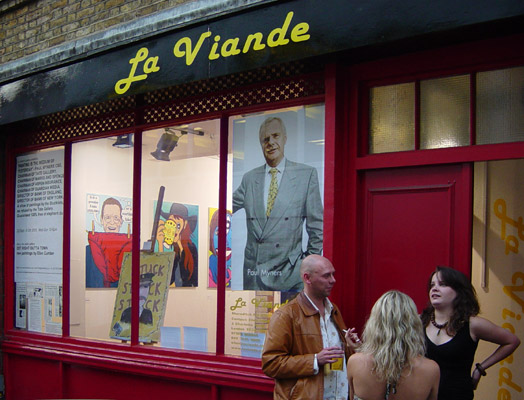
La Viande gallery, Shoreditch, London, 2005.

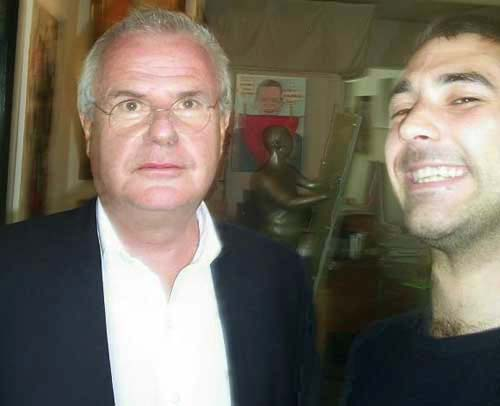
A Gallery, Wimbledon, London, 2007. Left: Paul Myners, Tate Chairman. Right: Fraser Kee Scott, A Gallery director.
