= Naive John =

British artist and figurative painter (born 1962)

- Born: Ian Wylie; 18 October 1962 (age 63)
- Known for: Painting
- Movement: Stuckism

Naive John (born Ian Wylie; 18 October 1962) is a British artist and figurative painter. His work centers around subjects that combine elements from popular culture alongside the mythic and mundane. He has also in the past been involved in the Stuckism art movement.

== Art ==
Naive John is a self-taught artist. Early work like The Blue Man (1988) with its use of flattened space and cartoon imagery predates Lowbrow art and Pop Surrealism and is indicative of the artist's maverick approach to art production. His current paintings combine mythological, surreal and popular images juxtaposed with Liverpool's urban setting. They often refer to concerns for the environment with a humorous element. The painting Sefton Park – Genetically Modified is a good example of the issues the artist has explored. In other paintings figures are shown in isolation and appear pensive and alienated from the rest of society. The relationship between the difficulty facing ordinary human beings making moral choices when they have to face hostile environmental factors is portrayed in Toxteth Cherub.

A commission painting, The Chav-ant Garde, is a depiction of the artist's dysfunctional family and a satire on media manipulated public outrage based around the stereotype of the chav. The family members are derived from the popular children's television series Teletubbies and In The Night Garden.

Naive John works very slowly, late at night, producing an average of three paintings a year. He uses water-based oil paints and his paintings are built up in layers using a variety of techniques: old master's Flemish methods, digital manipulation, sgraffito, rubbing with fingers, wiping paint off with a kitchen towel and other innovative methods.

His work is displayed in private and public collections, including the Hunterian Museum, Glasgow and the Roberts Institute of Art.

== Life ==
Naive John was born Ian Wylie in Poole, Dorset, his family moving to Glasgow when he was two years of age. He attended Cumbernauld High School, Glasgow 1973–79. During the period 1979–83 he took part in a youth training scheme, where amongst other things he played cards. In 1983 he was accepted without academic qualifications as an exceptional student at Greys School of Art, Aberdeen, but was later expelled. Within two years he had sold a painting Yellow Envy to Edwin Morgan, Scotland's Poet Laureate and won an award for his short experimental animation film Phobia. In 1998 he fled to Liverpool after a homophobic knife attack. Intensive psychotherapy followed during 1998 in an attempt to come to terms with his past traumatic experiences. He has since been diagnosed with dysthymia. Throughout his periods of illness he continued to produce drawings and paintings albeit in limited numbers. Ex-Vaselines front woman Frances McKee commissioned the artist to create several CD covers for her band Suckle.

In 2003 he started a BA (Hons) Art History course at Liverpool John Moores University, where he won the Susan Cotton Travel Scholarship. He adopted the name Naive John in 2004 and founded the Liverpool Stuckist group. He adopted the pseudonym Naive John as a means of distancing himself from mainstream artistic concerns of being "relevant", "fashionable" and "cutting edge". In 2004 his work was included in The Stuckists Punk Victorian show at the Walker Art Gallery during the 2004 Liverpool Biennial. This exhibition was a definitive showing of the Stuckist oeuvre at a national gallery and marked a key point in the development of the art movement. In October 2006 he curated and exhibited in Triumph of Stuckism. His painting The Other was the central image featured on promotional literature and attracted the attention of influential collector David Roberts. In 2007 Naive John was invited to exhibit his work as part of the Fellow Travellers touring group exhibition at Salford Museum alongside Holly Johnson and BP Portrait Award winner Sadie Lee. Salford Museum commissioned the artist in 2008 to produce public art to display on billboard spaces in Salford as part of Walkabout; a joint project with The Lowry. He exhibited in the Fellow Travellers show which took place in Korpfulstadir, Reykjavík, Iceland July 2008.

== Triumph of Stuckism ==
At the invitation of Professor Colin Fallows, Chair of Research at Liverpool School of Art and Design, Naive John led The Triumph of Stuckism, an international symposium on Stuckism announced for October 2006 at the Liverpool John Moores University during the Liverpool Biennial, along with an accompanying exhibition in the 68 Hope Gallery at Liverpool School of Art and Design (John Moores University Gallery). The title of the symposium is a reference to the Triumph of Painting shows staged in 2005 by Charles Saatchi, and according to The Independent newspaper, "Charles Saatchi is about to become the latest victim of a critical mauling from the people of Liverpool", whose "finest academics are meeting to slag off the secretive collector." It marks a new step for the artists: "The Stuckists have gained some academic credibility after being dismissed as a media freak-show."

Naive John chaired the symposium, which was announced as a day of illustrated lectures, presented by leading Stuckist artists and independent art historians. Booked speakers included: Guy Denning, Paul Harvey, Jacqueline Jones, Bill Lewis, Charles Thomson and Odysseus Yakoumakis. John also curated the exhibition of Stuckist paintings. The event was part of the programme of the 2006 Liverpool Biennial, and followed the Stuckist show at the 2004 Liverpool Biennial. Artists exhibiting in the 2006 show included Philip Absolon, Godfrey Blow, John Bourne, Jaime Braz, Guy Denning, John Geggie, Ella Guru, Paul Harvey, Naive John, Jacqueline Jones, Peter Klint, Bill Lewis, Mike Mayhew, Jesse Richards, Kim Richardson, Mary Von Stockhausen, Charles Thomson and Odysseus Yakoumakis.

== See also ==
- The Stuckists Punk Victorian
- Stuckist demonstrations
- Lowbrow art
- Pop Surrealism
