= John Bourne (artist) =

British artist and painter (born 1943)

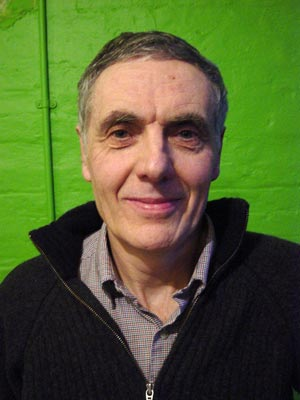
- John Bourne
- Born: 1943 (age 82–83)
- Education: Imperial College of Science and Technology
- Known for: Painting
- Notable work: Aeroplane, Tea at the Albert Dock
- Movement: Stuckism

John Bourne (born 1943) is a British artist and painter, living and working in Wales, and a member of the Stuckists art movement. He founded the Wrexham Stuckists group in 2001 and has been exhibited in the group's shows since then, including The Stuckists Punk Victorian. He has also taken part in Stuckist demonstrations against the Turner Prize. The subject matter for his paintings, which are done in a simplified style, comes from his memories.

== Life and career ==
John Bourne was born in Staffordshire, England, and spent much of his childhood in Northern Ireland; his father was a Methodist minister in the Yorkshire Dales and passionate about Van Gogh: Bourne says that his earliest memory, aged three, was of his father copying a Van Gogh painting.

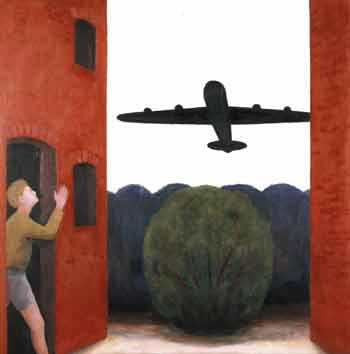
John Bourne. Aeroplane

1964–68, Bourne gained a BSc in Physics at the University College of North Wales, followed 1968–71 by an MPhil (Research on Solid State Theory) at the Imperial College of Science and Technology and H. C. Ørsted Institute, Copenhagen.

He worked as a computer programmer, maths teacher and physics lecturer, until 1986, when "I did a Gauguin but not in the South Seas. I walked out. It was tremendous." He has been a full-time artist ever since then. In 1990, he won first prize in the Mostyn Open 1 competition. In 1991, he staged a solo show at Theatr Clwyd, Mold. He has said that the increasing dominance of conceptual art proved obstructive to his own progress as a painter, and this came to a head in November 2001, when his work was rejected from a local exhibition: he began to despair of getting exposure.

He recalled an article about the Stuckists painting group which had appeared in The Sunday Times and responded to them: "I liked the Stuckist Manifesto with its emphasis on painting and artistic integrity. It contained many new ideas and seemed to sum up my disquiet concerning the contemporary art world. Here was a radical, modern movement which championed painting. Some of the artists appeared a little rough and their work at times shocking, but this seemed an advantage if anything."

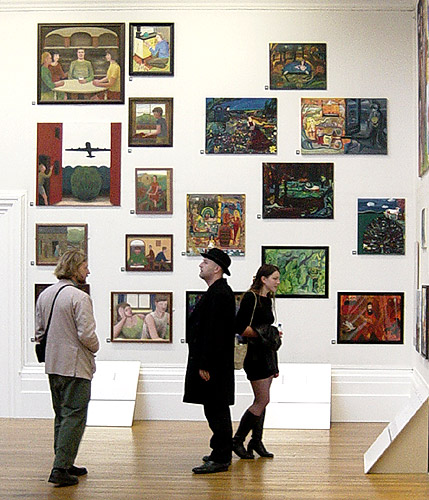
John Bourne's work (on the left) at The Stuckists Punk Victorian, 2004.

He immediately founded the Wrexham group of the Stuckists art movement, the first group in Wales, along with Elfyn Jones, Neil Robertson and Geraint Dodd. In 2002, he was included in The First Stuckist International and subsequent shows at the Stuckism International Gallery in London, as well as Stuck in Wednesbury at the Wednesbury Museum and Art Gallery. In 2003, founded the Welsh Stuckism International Centre at his home. From 2003, he took part in Stuckist demonstrations against the Turner Prize at Tate Britain.

In 2004, he was one of the fourteen "founder and featured" artists in The Stuckists Punk Victorian held at the Walker Art Gallery for the Liverpool Biennial. Bourne was a co-curator, doing work at the museum to arrange the show. Philip Key of the Liverpool Daily Post commented on the exhibition: "And they are not all lacking artistic skills. John Bourne of the Wrexham Stuckists—there are now groups all over the world—paints some well thought-out subdued portraits including the pleasing foursome in Tea at the Albert Dock."

Although Tate gallery director, Sir Nicholas Serota was dubbed the "least likely visitor" to the show, which included a wall of work satirising the Tate and Serota himself, such as Stuckist co-founder Charles Thomson's painting, Sir Nicholas Serota Makes an Acquisitions Decision, he did visit, describing the work as "lively", and meeting Bourne and other artists (see photo). In 2005, Serota rejected the Stuckists' offer of a donation of 160 paintings from the Walker show, because "We do not feel that the work is of sufficient quality in terms of accomplishment, innovation or originality of thought to warrant preservation in perpetuity in the national collection". Six of Bourne's paintings were amongst the rejected work.

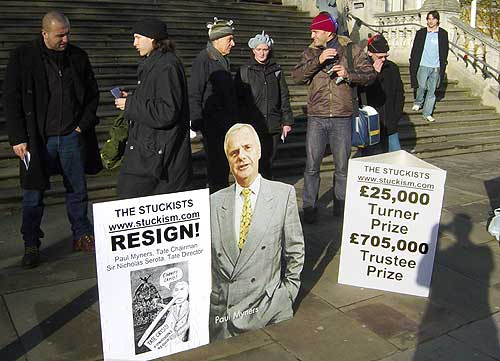
John Bourne (third from left) at the Stuckist demonstration outside the Turner Prize in 2005 against Tate's purchase of The Upper Room.

A direct consequence of the rejection was a Stuckist media campaign led by Thomson over the Tate's purchase of its trustee Chris Ofili's work, The Upper Room. This included a demonstration about the purchase outside the Turner Prize at Tate Britain in December 2005, where Bourne handed a protest leaflet to Serota—an event which Thomson considers to have precipitated Serota's angry defence of the purchase at the prize ceremony in the evening. In 2006 the Charity Commission censured the Tate and ruled that it had broken the law in making the purchase and similar trustee purchases during the previous 50 years. The Daily Telegraph called the verdict "one of the most serious indictments of the running of one of the nation's major cultural institutions in living memory."

Bourne curated a Wrexham Stuckists show at the Oswestry Heritage Centre, Shropshire, in 2005. He was one of the artists in the Triumph of Stuckism, a Stuckist painting exhibition which comprised part of Liverpool Biennial's 2006 programme at Liverpool John Moores University.

He lives with his wife in a red-brick terrace in rural Wales, and has two daughters living in London.

== Art ==
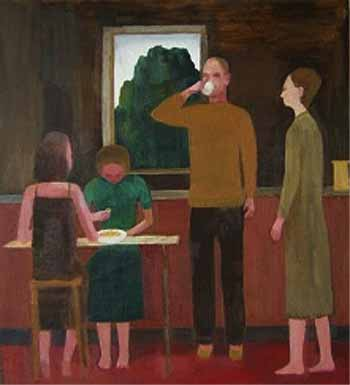
John Bourne. Epsom Kitchen.

Bourne is mostly self-taught. He works in acrylic, oil and ink to produce images, where visual detail is simplified in order to depict memories of both recent life and his Northern Ireland childhood. He said:

I start with memories. You only remember what’s relevant. I make loads of sketches from imagination. I pin the sketches on the wall. I often look at a sketch for months or even years before I see a way to make it into a painting. It usually goes well at first but then I run into problems of composition. I have to make many changes. Sometimes it’s years later that I find a way to finish it. I’m trying to reveal something of a world beyond time and space.

He describes the genesis of his painting Aeroplane as a fear of low-flying aircraft and the experience of seeing an aeroplane—which looked like a World War II Lancaster bomber—coming towards him over the treetops one day. While doing the painting he adjusted the angles in it obsessively "to get it just right".

== Gallery ==
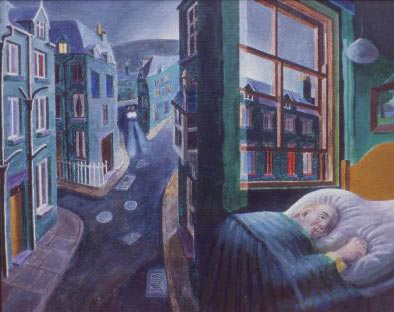
The Milk Float

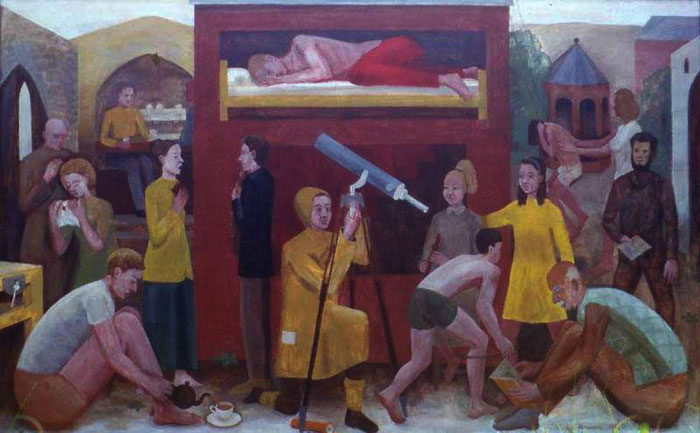
The Amateur

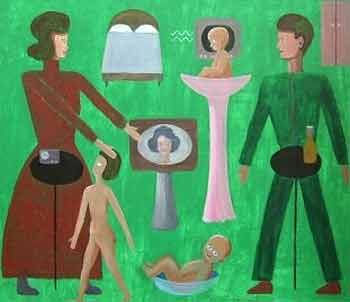
Domestic Scene

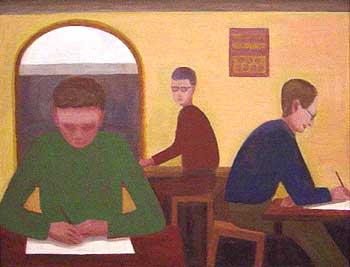
Postgraduates
