= The Stuckists Punk Victorian =

2004 art exhibition in Liverpool, England

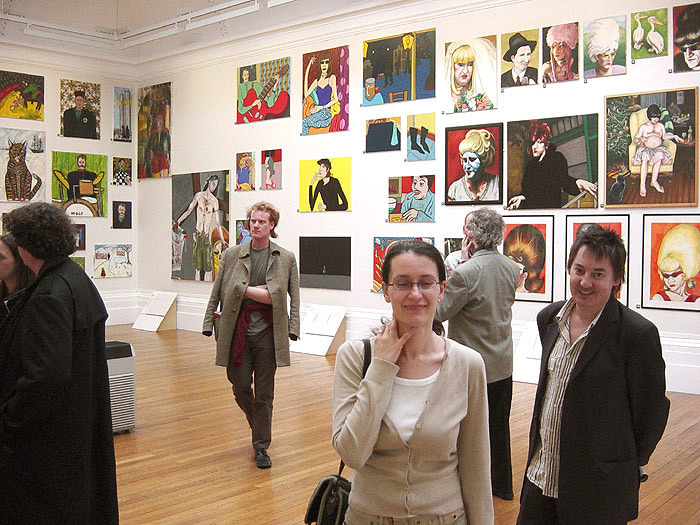
The Stuckists Punk Victorian show at the Walker Art Gallery, Liverpool, 2004. Foreground: artists Rachel Jordan and Paul Harvey. Between them (back turned): Bill Lewis. Background paintings, left to right: Wolf Howard, Mandy McCartin, Charles Thomson, Ella Guru.

The Stuckists Punk Victorian was the first national gallery exhibition of Stuckist art. It was held at the Walker Art Gallery and Lady Lever Art Gallery in Liverpool from 18 September 2004 to 20 February 2005 and was part of the 2004 Liverpool Biennial.

It comprised more than 250 paintings by 37 artists, mostly from the UK but also with a representation of international Stuckist artists from the US, Germany and Australia. There was also a smaller accompanying exhibition of the Stuckist Photographers. A book, The Stuckists Punk Victorian, was published to accompany the exhibition. Six fringe shows, created in association with the event, took place internationally.

Some of the work was compared with the "shocking" work of YBAs, Jake and Dinos Chapman. The gallery posted a warning notice of some "sexual and violent" subject matter. Daily Mail journalist, Jane Kelly, exhibited a painting of Myra Hindley and was dismissed from her job.

Critical reaction to the show ranged from "dreadful" to "the next big thing in art". Sir Nicholas Serota, director of the Tate gallery, visited the show and called it "lively". The Walker deemed it a very successful show and extended the run.

In 2005, the Stuckists offered 160 of the paintings as a donation to the Tate gallery. This was turned down by Serota on the grounds that the work was not of "sufficient quality". The rejection stimulated a campaign by the group over purchases of trustee work by the Tate. These purchases were subsequently censured by the Charity Commission.

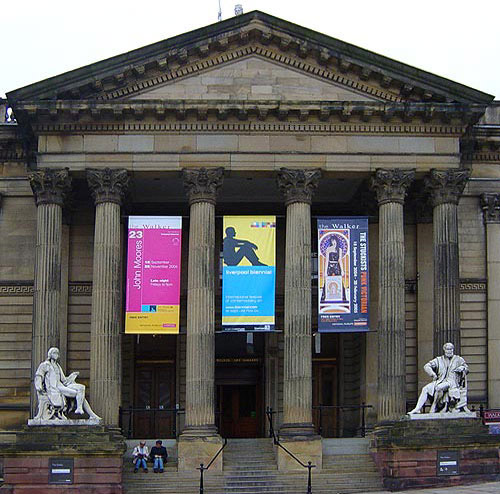
The Walker Art Gallery during the show.

== The Stuckists ==
The Stuckists were founded in 1999 by Charles Thomson and Billy Childish to promote figurative painting and oppose conceptual art. The name was derived from an insult by Tracey Emin. The original group of 13 artists has now grown to an international movement of over 160 groups in 40 countries. Childish left the group in 2001.

== Walker Art Gallery ==
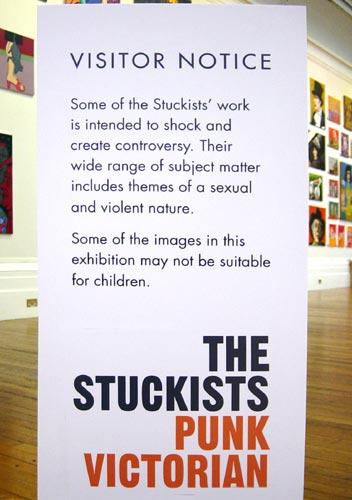
Warning notice in the Walker Art Gallery during the show.

The main show was in a large gallery at the Walker which normally houses works from the contemporary collection. The paintings were hung in a manner akin to the "salon" style, using the whole height of the wall. "Founder and featured artists" were each given their own space, while representative works from other UK and international artists were grouped accordingly. There was also a free-standing display of work which satirised the Tate Gallery and the Turner Prize.

The Gallery posted a notice:

VISITOR NOTICE: THE STUCKISTS PUNK VICTORIAN
Stuckist artists believe in "honest and uncensored expression". Their wide range of subject matter includes themes of a sexual and violent nature. Some of the images in this exhibition may not be suitable for children.

The show was extended from two to five months and the Walker called it "a really, really popular show and very successful."

== Lady Lever Art Gallery ==
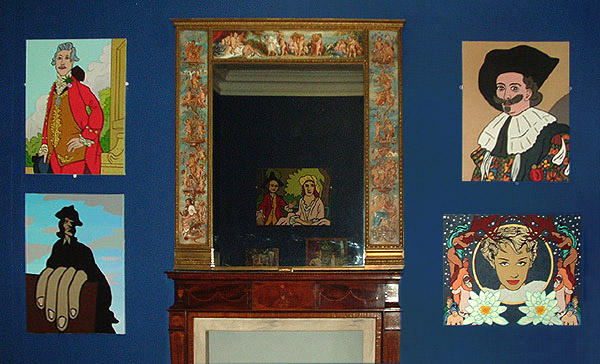
The Lady Lever Art Gallery: paintings by Charles Thomson and (bottom right) Paul Harvey.

A separate smaller show at the Lady Lever Art Gallery concentrated on the theme of "Art and Artists", including Stuckist interpretations of past work by artists such as Thomas Gainsborough, Frans Hals and Georges Seurat. The gallery also staged the first national exhibition by the Stuckist Photographers.

== Book ==
A 144-page book was published by National Museums Liverpool to accompany the show with 150 colour illustrations, including work by all the artists, as well as photographs showing the history of the group. A photograph from 1987 shows some of the group members in an earlier form as The Medway Poets, at which time Tracey Emin was associated with them. Other photographs are of demonstrations outside the Turner Prize, two artists (Ella Guru and Sexton Ming) getting married in drag, and Stella Vine in the Vote Stuckist show in 2001.

The book also includes two Stuckist manifestos, biographies of the artists, a section on Stuckist photographers, and two essays, "A Stuckist on Stuckism" by group co-founder, Charles Thomson and "Manifestos From the Edge and Beyond" by art historian Paul O'Keefe. The book was edited by Frank Milner and designed by March Design, Liverpool.

=== Cover ===
Cover of the book The Stuckists Punk Victorian.

The image on the cover is a painting by Paul Harvey (acrylic on canvas, 212.5 × 75.5 cm), and was originally intended to accompany a previous show, the Stuckists Real Turner Prize Show 2003, when the placard held by the main figure read "SEROTA NEEDS A GOOD SPANKING". Due to an argument between Harvey and another artist, Gina Bold, the painting was not used and the show was cancelled. Some months later the placard was repainted to promote the Walker show. The main figure is based on a photograph of the model, musician and DJ Emily Mann, taken by Charles Thomson.

=== A Stuckist on Stuckism ===
Thomson's essay starts with an account of a confrontation with Sir Nicholas Serota in Trafalgar Square in 2001 on the occasion of a Stuckist demonstration against the installation of Rachel Whiteread's sculpture Monument. It then traces the history of the group from origins in 1979 to its foundation in 1999, reviews "A Dysfunctional Decade of Saatchi Art", describes Stuckist demonstrations at the Turner Prize and gives background on artists who have left the Stuckists—co-founder Billy Childish, Stella Vine and Gina Bold. A final section puts the group in context in a wider historical view with a proposition that the development of Modernism has been a "story of fragmentation" and that it is necessary to provide a holistic approach. A passage by Eamon Everall is quoted to explain Stuckist art:

The Stuckists as a group are not wedded to some formulaic and often stultifying notion of what a painting should look like, as in past movements. For them the unifying element is not visual: it is their overriding and enduring search for emotional veracity and their concern with the authenticity and honesty of the creative impetus.

=== Manifestos From the Edge ===
Paul O'Keefe's essay, Manifestos from the Edge and Beyond, is in three sections. The first treats the history of Modernism in Britain and the scorn that greeted the 1910 Post-Impressionist exhibition. He describes the emergence of the homegrown radical movement, the Vorticists and how they clashed on one occasion, using brass knuckledusters, with rival avant-garde group the Italian Futurists. He includes Royal Academy President, Alfred Munnings', notorious 1949 speech, wanting to kick Picasso. He traces the evolution of radicalism into the new establishment, setting the scene for the Stuckist challenge to it.

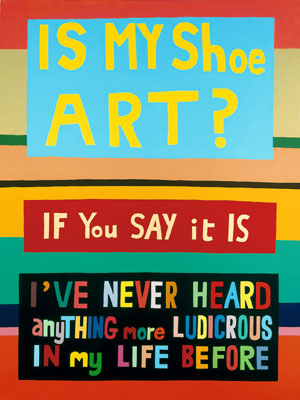
Charles Thomson. Is My Shoe Art?

The second section is an analysis of a BBC2 Newsnight programme on 19 October 1999 hosted by Jeremy Paxman with Charles Thomson attacking that year's Turner Prize and artist Brad Lochore defending it. Thomson was displaying Stuckist paintings, while Lochore had brought along a plastic detergent bottle on a cardboard plinth. At one stage Lochore states, "if people say it's art, it's art". Paxman asks, "So you can say anything is art?" and Lochore replies, "You could say everything is art..." At this point Thomson, off-screen, can be heard to say, "Is my shoe art?" while at the same time his shoe appears in front of Lochore, who observes, "If you say it is. I have to judge it on those terms." Thomson's response is, "I've never heard anything so ludicrous in my life before."

Part three describes the Stuckists' line of argument as "devastating in its capacity to demolish the pretensions of Conceptualism" and cites Damien Hirst's observation that "The best spot painting you can have by me is one painted by Rachel" (one of Hirst's assistants). O'Keefe's conclusion remains undecided as to "whether the Momart warehouse blaze indeed represents the funeral pyre of BritArt" and as to the future of Stuckism's role "from its outpost on the edge".

== Daily Mail ==
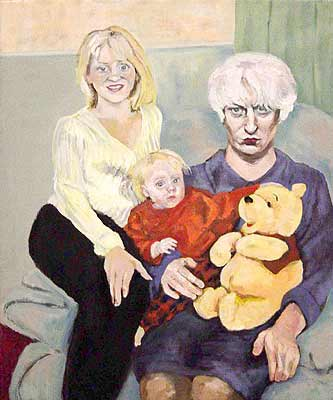
Jane Kelly. If We Could Undo Psychosis 2.

Daily Mail feature writer Jane Kelly, who is also a Stuckist artist, was sacked by the paper after exhibiting her painting If We Could Undo Psychosis 2 in the show. The painting shows a family group of mother and two children with child-killer Myra Hindley substituted for the father and holding a teddy bear. Thomson said, "It is not glorifying Myra Hindley, it's called psychosis—can anyone ever be healed is the question posed by this painting."

Kelly's sacking was reported on the front page of The Guardian, which described how the Daily Mail had welcomed a previous work by Kelly showing London Mayor Ken Livingstone in the context of the 1944 Stauffenberg plot against Hitler, and commented:

"Stuckism, the art movement founded by Tracey Emin's former boyfriend to oppose the pretensions of Britart, claims to advocate 'honest, uncensored expression'. Unfortunately, the Daily Mail does not appear to share those values".

The Daily Mail's managing editor, Lawrence Sear, who dismissed Kelly, described as "unmitigated rubbish" the claim that the loss of her job was related to her artwork and that "the departure of Jane Kelly is a matter only for her and the newspaper."

== Reaction ==
There was a very diverse reaction to the show. Adrian Searle, art critic of The Guardian called it "dreadful" and Tate Chairman, Paul Myners denounced it as "a travesty". "Young British Artist" Gavin Turk advised in a BBC interview that people should try to see the show.

The sexual and violent content of some of the paintings was commented on. Mark Lawson on BBC Radio 4 warned, with particular reference to a painting by Joe Machine of two sailors having anal sex, that the paintings might cause controversy, as they were "certainly not ... conventional" but contained "very bold and explicit images".

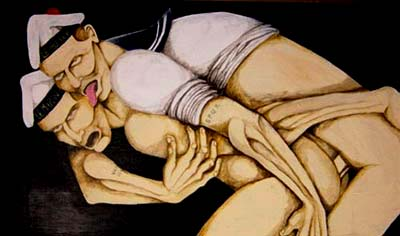
Joe Machine. Sea Shanty

Susan Mansfield in The Scotsman said they were "far from traditional or conservative" and "as shocking as anything Jake and Dinos Chapman could produce", adding "the Stuckists have a strong philosophical base". Simon Pia, another writer in the same paper, predicted the group would be "the next big thing in art".

A review in the inflight magazine Velocity evaluated the work as "a worthy argument for painting as the fundamental medium of artistic expression ... a refreshing willingness to be understood in today's world of oblique messages." The Sunday Times saw the presence of the work in an established national museum as "another step on the road to critical acceptance", as did the museum review site 24hourmuseum: ""They’ve spent years fighting the establishment. Now ... the Stuckists have been invited to join it."

== Fringe shows ==
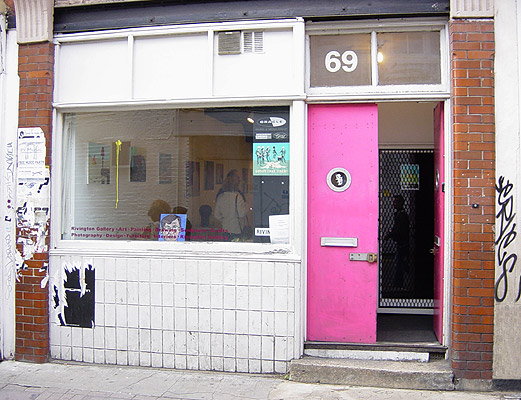
The Rivington Gallery, Shoreditch, London, held a fringe show.

There were also 6 simultaneous fringe shows:

- "Stigmata" or "Censorious": The Stuckists Punk Victorian at the Rivington Gallery in London
- Stuck in the Country at the Brockdam Gallery in Northumberland
- Stuckists in the Walker - Stuckists in Lewenhagen at the Stuckism Centre in Germany
- Stuckist Punk Victorian Lite If You Can't Be Bothered to Go to Liverpool in Edinburgh
- More of the Welsh Bit of the Stuckists Punk Victorian at the Stuckism Centre in Wales
- The Stuckists Punk Victorian In the Toilet in New Haven, US.

The Rivington Gallery issued a statement from its director, Harold Werner Rubin, that he was showing work from private collections by ex-Stuckists, Stella Vine and Gina Bold, which had been barred from the Walker show because of their objection, as well as a painting Charity Work by Philip Absolon which had also been excluded. The Scotsman reported that Stella Vine had threatened to commit suicide if her work was in the Stuckist show.

== Serota's visit and Tate donation ==
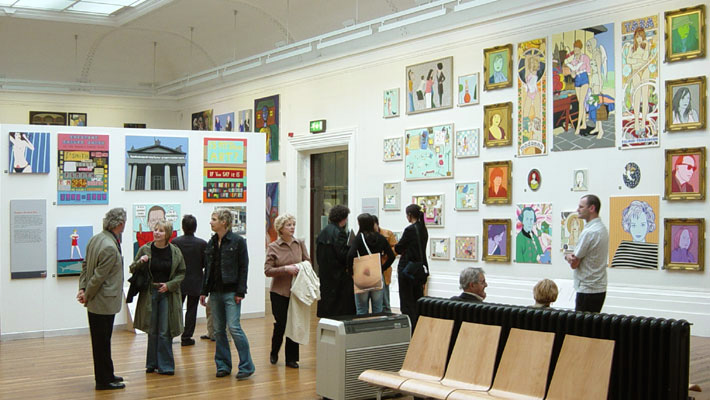
The display in the centre of the show satirised the Tate and Turner Prize. Work on the right wall is by Charles Williams and Paul Harvey.

Left to right: Charles Thomson, John Bourne, Sir Nicholas Serota, Joe Machine, at the show, 17 September 2004.

Sir Nicholas Serota was dubbed the "least likely visitor" to the show, which included a wall of work satirising the Tate and Serota himself, such as Thomson's Sir Nicholas Serota Makes an Acquisitions Decision. In fact, he did visit and met the artists, describing the work as "lively".

In 2005, the Stuckists offered a donation of 160 paintings from the show with a value of £500,000 to the Tate. This offer was rejected by Serota, who wrote, "the works in question have been reviewed by our curators and presented to the Board of Trustees ... We do not feel that the work is of sufficient quality in terms of accomplishment, innovation or originality of thought to warrant preservation in perpetuity in the national collection." The Times reported:

The Tate was accused yesterday of snubbing one of Britain’s foremost collections after it rejected a gift of 160 paintings that had been given pride of place at the Walker Art Gallery in Liverpool. Its director, Sir Nicholas Serota, said that the works did not deserve to be in a national collection, even though their five-month exhibition last autumn drew thousands of people to the Walker, one of the outstanding collections of fine art in Europe and part of National Museums Liverpool."

Thomson said, "The Tate ... rejected Modernism and artists such as Matisse and Picasso ... Now it has lost the nation the prime works of an international movement founded in Britain. A direct consequence of this was a media campaign Thomson led over the Tate's purchase of its trustee Chris Ofili's work, The Upper Room. In 2006 the Charity Commission censured the Tate and ruled that it had broken the law in making the purchase and similar trustee purchases during the previous 50 years. The Daily Telegraph called the verdict "one of the most serious indictments of the running of one of the nation's major cultural institutions in living memory."

== Artists ==
=== Featured artists ===
Philip Absolon, Frances Castle, Elsa Dax, Eamon Everall, Ella Guru, Paul Harvey, Wolf Howard, Bill Lewis, Joe Machine, Peter McArdle, Mandy McCartin, Sexton Ming, Charles Thomson, Charles Williams

=== UK artists ===
Stephen Coots, David John Beesley, Dan Belton, John Bourne, Jonathon Coudrille, Michelle England, Stephen Howarth, Naive John, Rachel Jordan, Jane Kelly, Emily Mann, Daniel Pincham-Phipps, Matthew Robinson, Mary von Stockhausen.

=== International artists ===
Godfrey Blow, J Todd Dockery, Brett Hamil, Tony Juliano, ZF Lively, Terry Marks, Jesse Richards

=== Photographers ===
Andy Bullock, Larry Dunstan, Wolf Howard, Charles Thomson

== Gallery ==
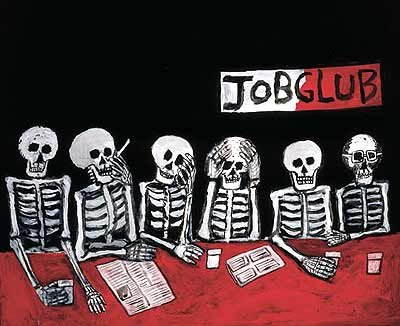
Philip Absolon. Job Club

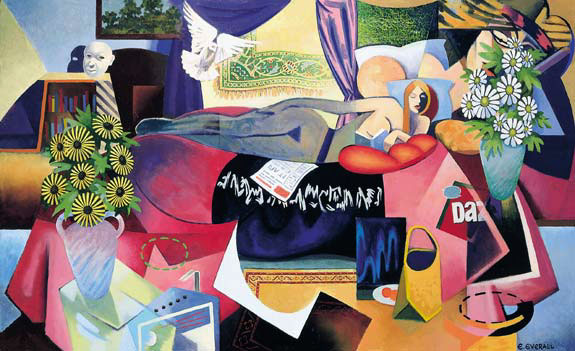
Eamon Everall. A Newer Olympia

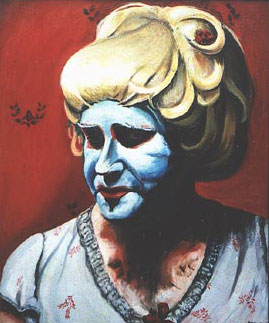
Ella Guru. Facepack

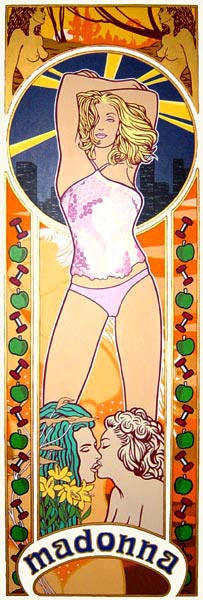
Paul Harvey. Madonna

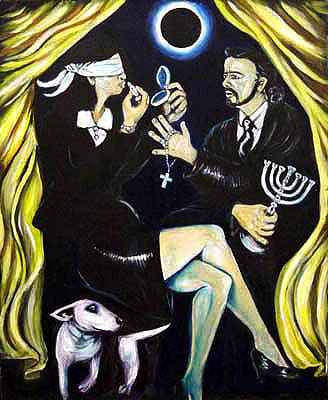
Bill Lewis. God Is an Atheist: She Doesn't Believe in Me

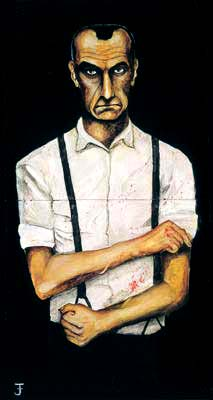
Joe Machine. My Grandfather Will Fight You

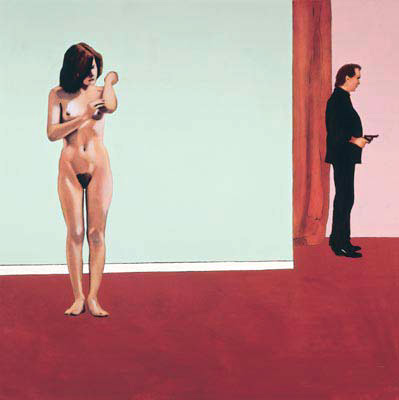
Peter McArdle. On a Theme of Annunciation

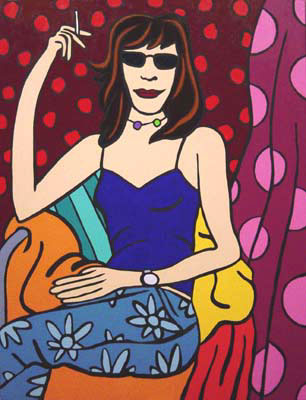
Charles Thomson. A Long Way from Greece

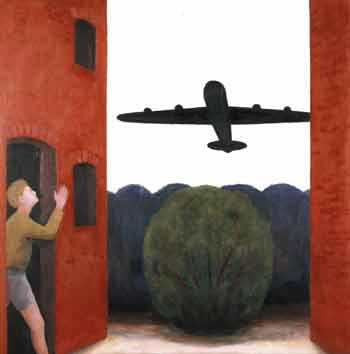
John Bourne. Aeroplane

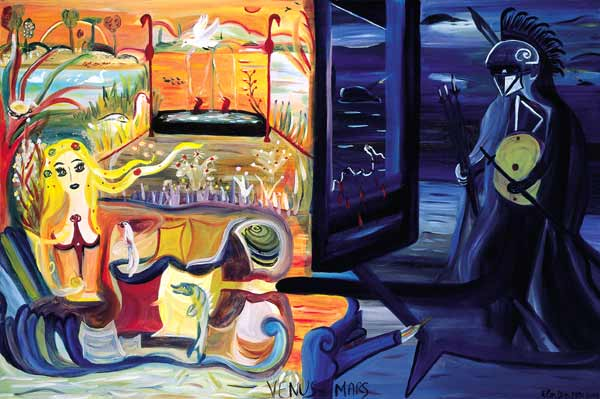
Elsa Dax. Venus and Mars

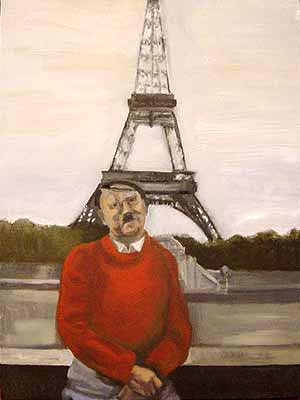
Jane Kelly. If We Could Undo Psychosis 1

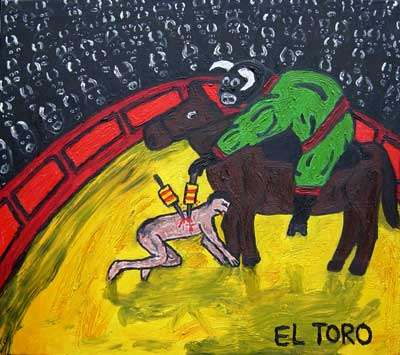
Wolf Howard. El Toro
