= Mounsi =

French novelist and singer (born 1951)

Mounsi (born 1951) is a French novelist and singer, born in Kabylie, Algeria. Aged seven, his father brought him to live in France, growing up in the red-belt suburb of Nanterre in Paris. Petty crime saw him in borstal, where he discovered his voice as an author after reading the poetry of François Villon.

His only work published in English translation is The Demented Dance (Black Amber, 2003), which was originally published in France in 1986. The book draws heavily on Mounsi's growing up amidst petty crime in the red-belt suburbs and could be seen as a companion piece for films like La Haine. The book was released to substantial acclaim in the UK and like his other French novels, is the recipient of a number of literary prizes. In 2004, he was presented with the inaugural 3AM Good Sex Prize at the Stuckism International Gallery in London.

His other books include: La Cendre des Villes awarded the Lauréat de la Bourse du Centre national du livre, Le Voyage des Ames awarded the Prix de l'Astrolabe-étonnants voyageurs, Territoire d'outre-ville and Les sauvageons expliqués aux fils des ministres. Dubbed the 'Boris Vian of the Inner City' by Le Nouvel Observateur, Mounsi has also written a number of plays and recorded three albums for the French label Disques Motors.
