= Rachel Jordan =

English painter

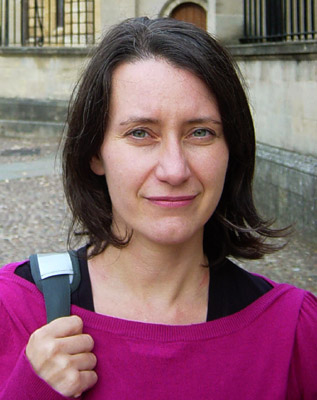
- Photo of Rachel Jordan by Charles Thomson
- Born: 8 May 1968 (age 57); Maldon, Essex, England
- Education: University of Sheffield, City Literary Institute
- Known for: Painting
- Movement: Stuckism

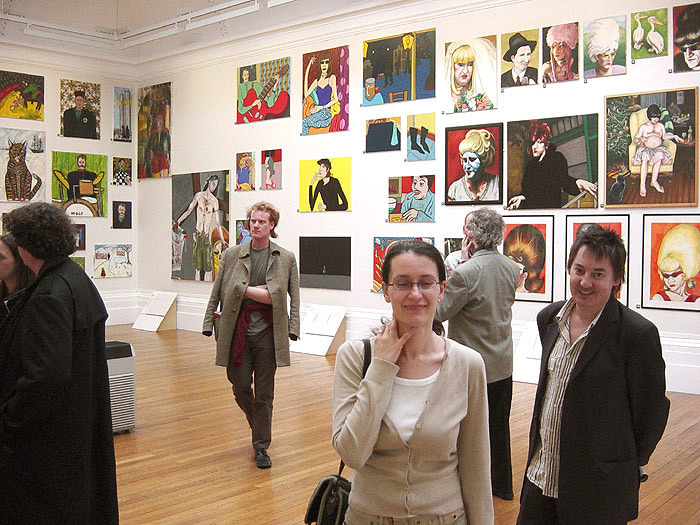
Rachel Jordan at The Stuckists Punk Victorian show, Walker Art Gallery, Liverpool, 2004. With her is Paul Harvey.

Rachel Jordan (born 8 May 1968) is a British artist and has been a frequent guest exhibitor with the Stuckists. For Stuckist shows she created satirical figurative paintings; however, her main body of work is abstract paintings and drawings, alluding to cellular forms.

== Life and career ==
Rachel Jordan was born in Maldon, Essex, England, and attended the University of Sheffield (1986–90), where she obtained Dual Honours in French and Hispanic Studies, then worked in office jobs until 1999, while also attending a fine art course 1995–98 at the City Literary Institute, London, where her final show, The Princess Project, consisted of paintings about Princess Diana. In 2000, she started work as a picture researcher for BBC Books. The same year, she exhibited in the Stuckist show, The Resignation of Sir Nicholas Serota and took part, dressed as a Pierrot, in the first Stuckist demonstration against the Turner Prize outside Tate Britain.

In 2001, she moved from London to Chatham to live with Stuckist artist Wolf Howard, with whom she shared a studio for three years. In 2003–04, she ran children's art workshops in Medway galleries and schools, then for Colchester Borough Council and firstsite Gallery in 2005–06, and in Oxford in 2007. In 2004, she was included in the Stuckists' show The Stuckists Punk Victorian, at the Walker Art Gallery during the Liverpool Biennial. She said that she is 95% recovered from ME, from which she suffered.

She was a friend of Miriam Hyman, who was killed in the 7 July 2005 London bombings.

== Art ==
The Whole Word – The Turner Prize = A Better World by Rachel Jordan.

Jordan has painted work satirising the Tate gallery and the Turner Prize, including one painting based on Martin Creed's illuminated lettering The Whole World – The Work = The Whole World, which at one time was displayed on the portico of Tate Britain (it is now in Tate Modern). Jordan's painting shows the installation at Tate Britain, but with substituted words and is called The Whole World – The Turner Prize = A Better World. She said:

I felt incensed by Martin Creed's light going on and off in Tate Britain, but was unable to do a satirical painting of it because there was nothing there, so I did this one instead.

Her main body of work consists of abstract paintings and drawings in acrylic, watercolour and charcoal using repeated patterns based on circles and squares. She said:

I think I still have a lot of expression coming through because I use water colours, and that can be very variable in how strong or weak the colour is on the paper. I don’t try to keep the colour that consistent when I apply it. Also, I don’t use a ruler. So, if I’m doing a hexagon I don’t try to make it a totally perfect mathematical hexagon. I’m just drawing by hand, so I still regard my paintings as full and free expression. What is also unlimited is the amount and combination of colours and forms that you can have.

Psychedelic Frogspawn by Rachel Jordan.

She describes these abstracts as suggestive of "cellular life", citing influences from Paul Klee and Edward Hopper, as well as Roman mosaics, Islamic patterns, Egyptian hieroglyphics and the shapes revealed in aerial photography.

== See also ==
- Abstract art
