= Stuckist photographers =

Cellular Toxicity

Stuckist photographers develop the values of the Stuckism art painting movement into film and photography. Some of them are in a group called the Stuckist Photographers.

== Individual photographers ==
Robert Janás is a Czech Stuckist photographer and poet. He founded The Prague Stuckists in 2004, and has curated shows of the group and held solo photography shows.

Alexis Hunter was a contemporary New Zealand painter and photographer, who used feminist theory in her work. She lived in London. Hunter was a member of Stuckism. In 2011 she exhibited photography in The Enemies of Art show in London with the Stuckists. She took part in Stuckist demonstrations against the Turner Prize, and published photos of the 2008 demonstration on her website.

== Group ==
The Stuckist Photographers were founded in London advocating feeling, ideas and personal expression. This was a development of the Stuckism movement from painting into film and photography. Stuckist Photographers share many of the ideals uniting the Stuckist painters.

The Stuckist Photographers emerged when Larry Dunstan asked, "Is there a place for photography in Stuckism?" The photography group is independent of the artists' group, but in alliance with it. The photographers also state that they are a Remodernist group, meaning that their aspiration is to establish "a new spirituality in art".

Gina's Restaurant, a photograph by Charles Thomson (centre). He states: "The photos that I am in, I took with the camera held at arm's length."

The Manifesto of the Stuckist Photographers states 11 points, among them:

Concepts with integrity are at the heart of the Stuckist photograph
The Stuckist Photographer develops vision and reality
The Stuckist Photographer has depth, soul, heart, love and passion for the art of photography

An exhibition of the Stuckist Photographers, their first major show, took place at the Lady Lever Art Gallery as part of The Stuckists Punk Victorian show during the 2004 Liverpool Biennial. Jesse Richards wrote in NYArts of Wolf Howard's photography: "beautiful haunting images that seem to be from a world long gone by." He said " The work of Andy Bullock on the other hand, and Dunstan to a slightly lesser degree unfortunately smacks of them being conceptual artists in Stuckist clothing".

The other current members are Wolf Howard, Ella Guru and Charles Thomson. They each take a different approach to photography. Bullock, whose work is in the National Portrait Gallery, takes an introspective and sometimes political stance. Dunstan uses his facility as a commercial photographer to address the question of beauty, as well as environmental issues and the effects of technology, such as airborne "tube dust". Howard works exclusively with pinhole photographs, and Thomson records his everyday experiences with a "snap-shot vocabulary".

== See also ==
- The Stuckists Punk Victorian
- Remodernist Film
