= Joe Machine =

English painter and poet (born 1973)

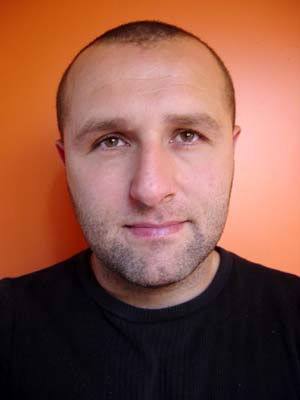
- Joe Machine (circa 2008)
- Born: Joseph Stokes; 6 April 1973 (age 53); Chatham, Kent, England
- Education: No formal training
- Occupations: Painter, poet
- Known for: Painting
- Notable work: My Grandfather Will Fight You, Sea Shanty
- Movement: Stuckism

Joe Machine (born Joseph Stokes, 6 April 1973) is an English painter and poet. He is a founding member of the Stuckists art group.

== Life ==
Joseph Machine was born in Chatham, Kent, and comes from a Romani background on the Isle of Sheppey.

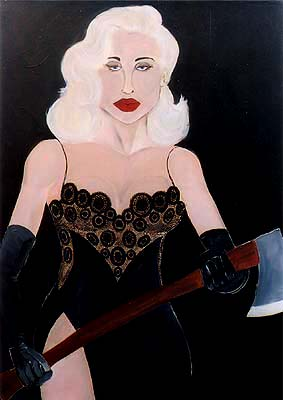
Joe Machine. Diana Dors with an Axe

In 1988, Machine was sent to Alston House Approved School, Rochester, for the theft of scrap material, and the following year to a Dover borstal for young offenders, after burgling a greengrocers in Leysdown (Isle of Sheppey). He spent time claiming benefits and running the family business, an amusement arcade in Leysdown, as well as breeding Rottweiler dogs and working as a bouncer in South London night clubs.

He started painting around 1988 and has not had any formal college art training. He has described creativity as the way out of the background in which he felt trapped: "Painting and writing have been far better for me than any of the mistakes I made in stealing and fighting."

In 1999, he was one of the thirteen original founder members of the Stuckists, an anti-conceptual-art group, co-founded by Billy Childish and Charles Thomson. His painting Diana Dors with an Axe (after actress Diana Dors) was used on the front cover of the first book on the group, The Stuckists, and also to promote the show The Real Turner Prize Show in Shoreditch in 2000.

Machine has exhibited widely with the Stuckists, most notably in their first national museum exhibition, at the Walker Art Gallery for the 2004 Liverpool Biennial. The exhibition, titled The Stuckists Punk Victorian, was a definitive showing of the Stuckist oeuvre, and Machine was one of the "featured artists". Reviewing the Walker show, Mark Lawson commented, referring to Machine's painting, Sea Shanty:

Although they set themselves against conceptual art, they're certainly not standing up for conventional painting. These are very bold and explicit images, particularly a painting over to my left, in which a sailor is taking another sailor from behind... is probably about as far as we can go in describing it. And that is an image, which is very bold, very explicit, and could lead to protests and complaints.

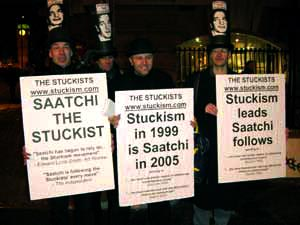
Joe Machine (third from left) in a protest at the Saatchi Gallery, 2005.

In January 2005, he took part in a Stuckist protest at the launch of the Triumph of Painting show at the Saatchi Gallery in London. In December that year, he was part of the Stuckist protest outside the Turner Prize at Tate Britain to draw attention to the Tate's purchase of its trustee Chris Ofili's work The Upper Room and demand the resignation of the Tate director, Sir Nicholas Serota.

Machine was one of the ten leading Stuckist artists to show in the Go West exhibition at the Spectrum London gallery in October 2006, where six of his paintings sold in advance of the show opening.

Machine commented on the Stuckists: "some of the paintings are not all that marvellous ... But everyone's painting and getting involved".

Artist and musician Billy Childish owns a Machine painting of a woman slashing her wrists, which he describes as "quite disturbing".

Machine sang with the "junk" group, The Dirty Numbers, and has published six poetry books.

In 2003, Machine married Charlotte Gavin, who has exhibited her work in Stuckist shows.

== Art ==
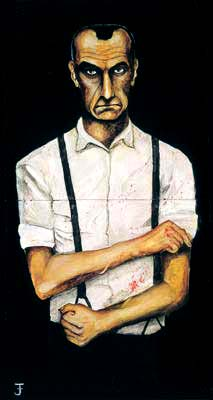
Joe Machine. My Grandfather Will Fight You.

Machine's work is strongly autobiographical and often draws on life experiences of sex and violence. Machine works with a limited range of mostly five colours (which Machine claims was initially due to poverty), and has cited his grandfather, who used to paint, as a major influence.

Recurrent images are emaciated women, sailors and bloodshed. He has shown fighting dogs and a sailor having his throat slit . Other images are actresses Ute Lemper, and Diana Dors with an axe and also with a sub-machine gun. My Grandfather Will Fight You depicts a gaunt older man with clenched fists and blood-spattered shirt, painted on two wooden boards nailed together.

== Gallery ==
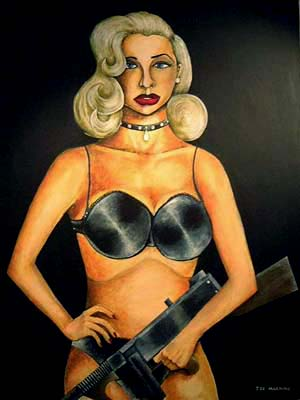
Diana Dors with a Machine Gun

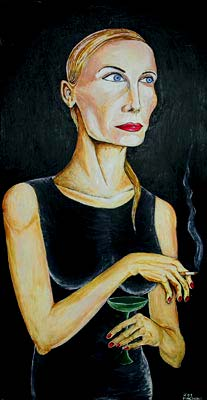
Ute Lempe

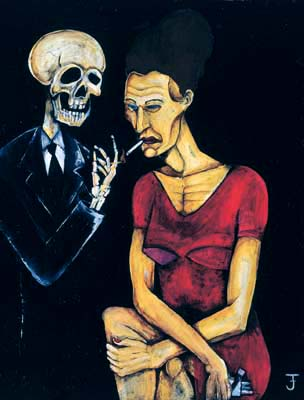
My Mother's Last Cigarette

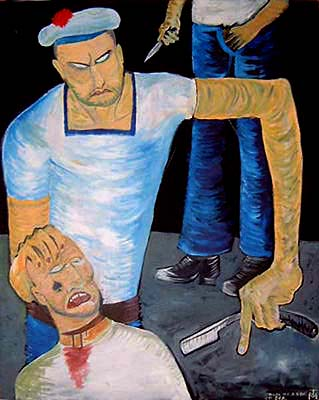
Sailor on a Sea of Sex

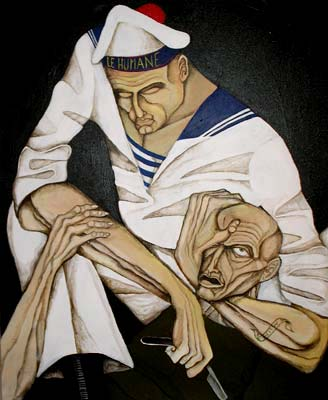
Sex Crime Variation 2

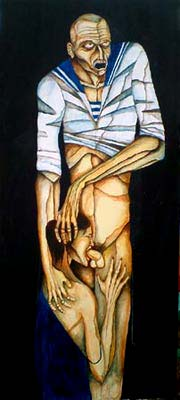
Oral Sex

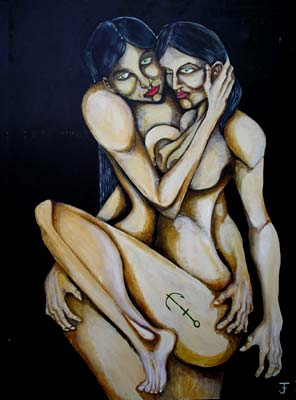
Two Girlies

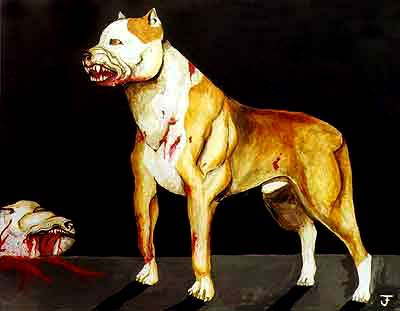
Until the Last Dog Is Hung
