= Stuckism International Gallery =

2002–2005 gallery of the Stuckist art movement

Coordinates: 51°31′35″N 0°4′52″W

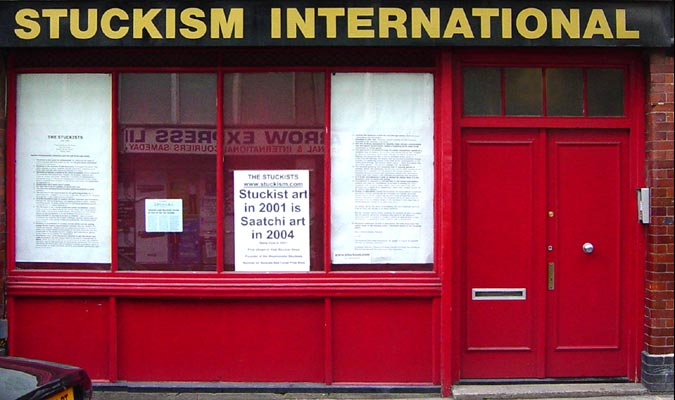
Stuckism International Gallery in 2004

The Stuckism International Gallery was the gallery of the Stuckist art movement. It was open from 2002 to 2005 in Shoreditch, and was run by Charles Thomson, the co-founder of Stuckism. It was launched by a procession carrying a coffin marked "The death of conceptual art" to the neighbouring White Cube gallery.

The gallery staged group and solo shows of Stuckist paintings, and displayed a preserved shark as a challenge to Damien Hirst and Charles Saatchi. The premises were taken over by La Viande gallery, which shut in 2008.

== History ==
Charles Thomson had originally intended to buy a Shoreditch warehouse building with his then-wife, Stella Vine, but, after the arrangements had been made, she withdrew from the project. He subsequently made the purchase on his own.

The Stuckism International Gallery opened July 2002 at 3 Charlotte Road, Shoreditch, in a four-story Victorian warehouse, 70 yards (64 m) away from the White Cube gallery, which represents Tracey Emin and Damien Hirst, conceptual art which the Stuckists oppose. Thomson lived on the premises, using the ground floor and basement for a studio. He said:

The space was designed to fulfill the belief stated in our manifesto that the best space for art is not a white wall gallery but the more human space of a home (or a musty museum). The main space was my living room. It had sofas and normal home lighting, not gallery spotlights, which create a separation between the art and the viewer. People could come in, sit down, maybe have a cup of tea and experience the art as part of their environment, if they wanted to. The upstairs walls were either brick or painted maroon, and the downstairs a deep green. It was a small oasis in the greyness of the outside environment...

Stephen Howarth was a member of the Students for Stuckism group at Camberwell College of Arts and in 2002 was "expelled from the painting course for doing paintings." He was given a show, before the official opening of the gallery, with the title I Don't Want a Painting Degree if it Means Not Painting.

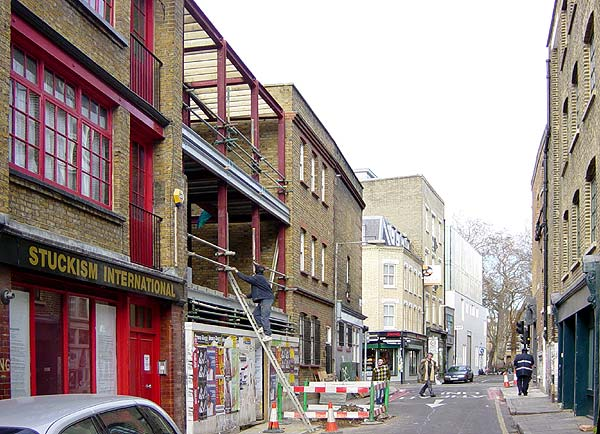
The White Cube gallery is at the end of the road

To celebrate the opening of the gallery, the Stuckists carried a cardboard coffin round to the nearby White Cube gallery to announce "The Death of Conceptual Art".

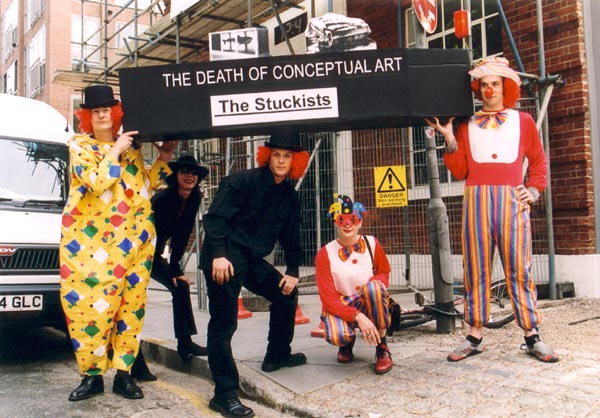
Stuckist artists leave a coffin, marked "The death of conceptual art", outside the White Cube gallery in Shoreditch, 25 July 2002.

This event also launched the first formal group show at the gallery which was The First Stuckist International. The show had Stuckist art from around the world including Melbourne, Pittsburgh and the Ivory Coast. It ran till October 2002, reinforcing the Stuckist manifesto endorsement of content, meaning and communication through painting as the most viable contemporary form of art.

David Prudames of 24 Hour Museum reviewed the show, "This exhibition of Stuckist work from around the world at a purpose built gallery lays the movement's foundations and states it is here to stay." Arty magazine edited by Cathy Lomax of Transition Gallery said, "Work presented here is always a wonder to behold... The best painted space in town—the coloured walls are themselves better than some galleries' shows... Art with attitude, whatever style you happen to enjoy. And there are more styles here than you'd be led to believe." However, Sarah Kent stated in Time Out, "it will prove their undoing. These vociferous opportunists are revealed to be a bunch of Bayswater Road-style daubers without an original idea between them."

In October 2002 the Gallery displayed a betting slip by Sean Hall. This was a bet that "Charles Saatchi, the renowned contemporary art collector, will purchase the original of this betting slip for pounds 1,000 or more on or before 31 December 2005."

In December 2002 the gallery staged The Real Turner Prize Show to protest that the Tate's Turner Prize should be for paintings. The four artists shown at the gallery—Ella Guru, Mandy McCartin, Paul Harvey and Charles Williams—shared the Stuckist prize.

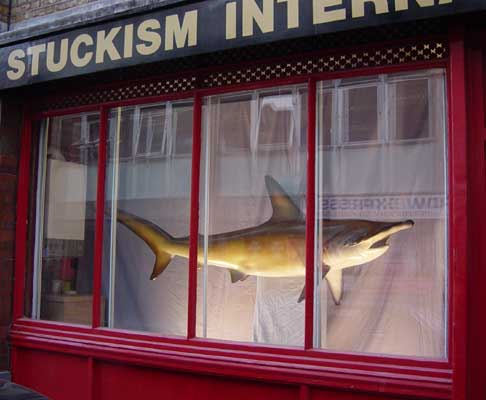
A Dead Shark Isn't Art, Stuckism International, 2003.

On 17 April 2003, when the Saatchi Gallery opened in new premises at County Hall with a display of Damien Hirst's work, including The Physical Impossibility of Death in the Mind of Someone Living (a shark in formaldehyde in a vitrine), the Stuckism gallery displayed a stuffed shark in their window. This 148 kg (325 lb) golden hammerhead shark had been caught off Florida in 1989, two years before Hirst's work was made, by Eddie Saunders, who displayed it in his Shoreditch shop, JD Electrical Supplies. Thomson asked:

If Hirst’s shark is recognised as great art, then how come Eddie’s, which was on exhibition for two years beforehand, isn’t? "Do we perhaps have here an undiscovered artist of genius, who got there first, or is it that a dead shark isn’t art at all? Not only did Eddie catch it himself — unlike Hirst — but it is also in considerably better condition.

We can’t see why Hirst’s shark was made so much fuss of when Eddie’s has been in a public London venue all this time. A lot of people admired it in his shop, but I doubt that anyone considered it a work of artistic genius.

The Stuckists suggested Hirst may got the idea for his work from Saunders' shop display.

In September 2003, the gallery collaborated with the Prince of Wales in hosting a charity show and auction with paintings including ones by Judi Dench, Jerry Hall and, said Thomson, "a painting from the BritArt artist Gavin Turk, who is normally somebody we would attack." The next month, the gallery's scheduled show, The Real Turner Prize Show, was cancelled because of a dispute with Gina Bold, one of the artists, over how it should be promoted.

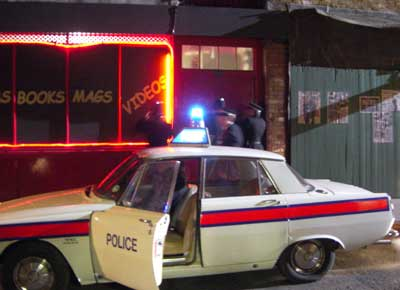
Gallery as a BBC set for The Long Firm.

In February 2004, the gallery exterior was turned into a 1960s and 1970s sex shop frontage as a set for the BBC2 gangster drama, The Long Firm (based on the book by Jake Arnott).

In May 2004, Mounsi was presented with the inaugural 3AM Good Sex Prize at the gallery for his book, The Demented Dance, after an event which included readings by Tony White and Colin MacCabe. Later that month, Charles Saatchi and his wife, Nigella Lawson arrived in a black cab to visit the gallery, but failed to gain admission, as Thomson was upstairs drinking coffee and Saatchi did not ring the bell.

The last exhibition at the Gallery, in July 2004, was a solo show, Hysterical Shock, consisting of 12 paintings by Gina Bold from private collections and named after the title of one of them. It was curated by Louise Urwin and Tom Cowley. Bold was invited to participate in the show, but did not reply or attend it.

=== La Viande ===
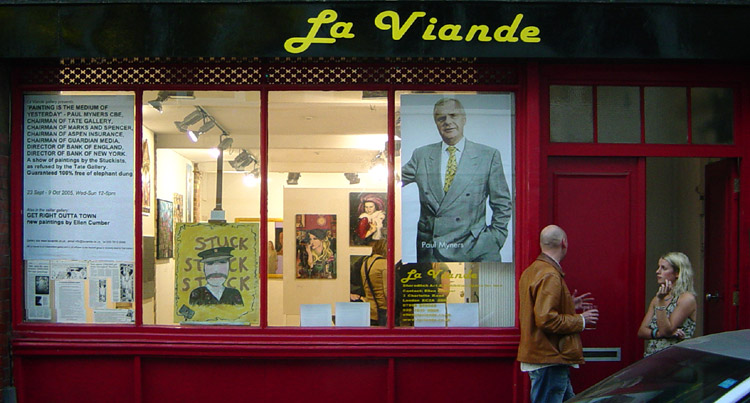
Stuckist show at La Viande gallery, 2005.

Thomson moved in 2005 and the premises were taken over by La Viande gallery, which staged a Stuckist exhibition in September 2005, called "Painting Is the Medium of Yesterday"—Paul Myners CBE, Chairman of Tate Gallery, Chairman of Marks and Spencer, Chairman of Aspen Insurance, Chairman of Guardian Media, Director of Bank of England, Director of Bank of New York. A Show of Paintings by the Stuckists, as Refused by the Tate Gallery. Guaranteed 100% Free of Elephant Dung.

A large photo was displayed in the gallery window of Paul Myners, who had made the remark, "Painting is the medium of yesterday", to the Stuckists during their demonstration in 2004 against the Turner Prize at Tate Britain. He had also told them that their popular show, The Stuckists Punk Victorian at the Walker Art Gallery in Liverpool, was "a travesty".

In February 2008, La Viande staged Disney Heroines Committing Suicide, a show of two Stuckist artists, Abby Jackson and Mark D, the latter's work satirising Stella Vine's paintings. La Viande closed in July 2008.

== List of shows ==
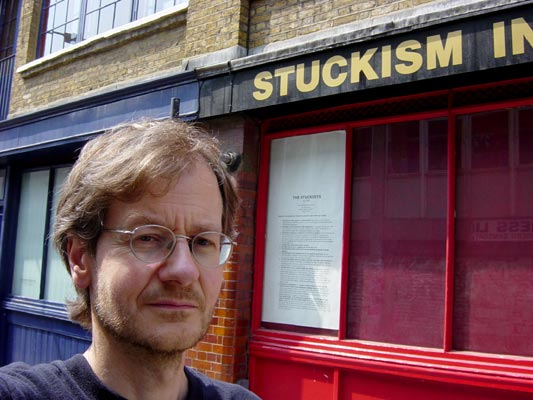
Charles Thomson outside the gallery in 2004

Group Shows

- The First Stuckist International
- War on Blair
- The Real Turner Prize Show 2002
- Stuckist Classics..
- Stuckist Classics 2
- Stuckist Classics 3
- The Stuckist Summer Show 2003
- Kith and Kids charity show included work by Ella Guru, Paul Harvey, Charles Thomson (artist), Jane Kelly, Gina Bold, Adrian Bannister, Jerry Hall, Elizabeth Jagger, Judi Dench, Richard Rogers, Gavin Turk, Keith Coventry and Jon Moss
- Cabinet of Conceptualism featured a brick by Mike Dawson and a Saatchi betting slip by Sean Hall.
- The Real Turner Prize Show 2003 (cancelled)

Solo shows

- A Dead Shark Isn't Art, Eddie Saunders
- Intellectual Property, photos by Larry Dunstan
- The Vagina Monologues Of An Essex Boy, David Beesley
- Portraits of Leigh Bowery by Sexton Ming
- The Pinhole Photography of a Gifted Gentleman Amateur, Wolf Howard
- Being On The Dole Is Like Playing Chess with Hitler, Wolf Howard
- Hysterical Shock, Gina Bold

Other

- 3:AM Magazine Good Sex Prize, presented by Madame Tytania (with whip)

== Gallery ==
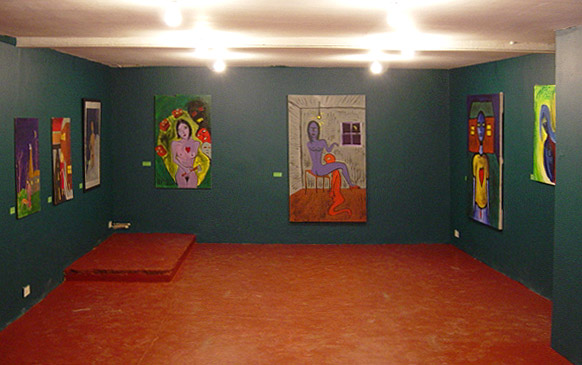
I Don't Want a Painting Degree if it Means Not Painting, Stephen Howarth, June 2002

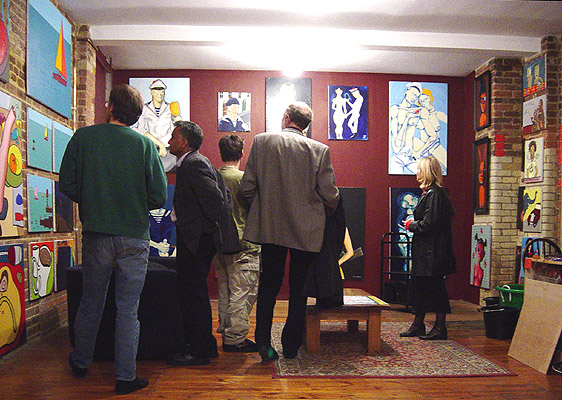
The First Stuckist International, July 2002

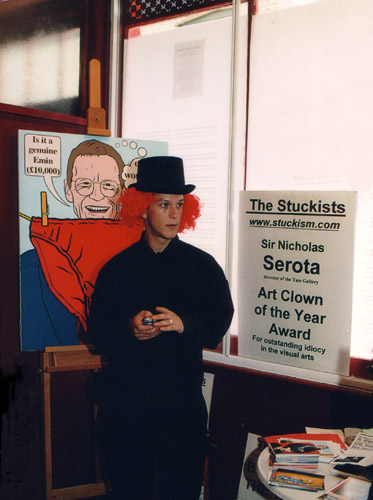
The First Stuckist International, July 2002

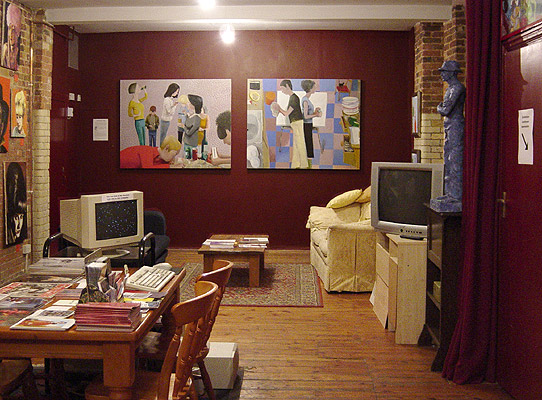
The Real Turner Prize Show 2002, December 2002

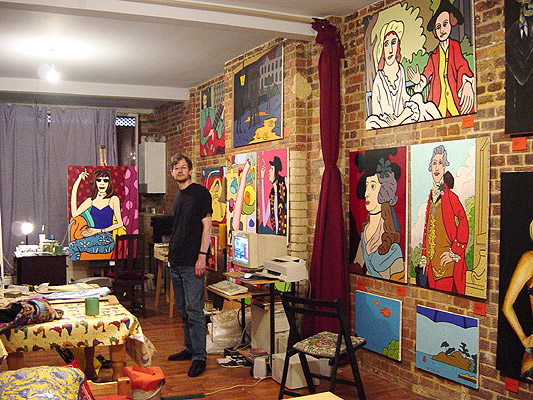
The Stuckists Summer Show, June 2003

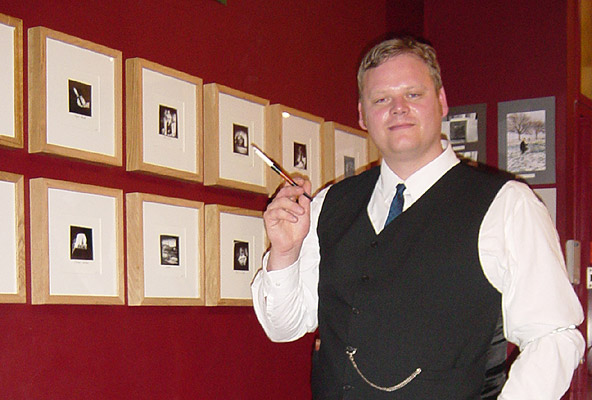
The Pinhole Photography of a Gifted Gentleman Amateur, Wolf Howard, October 2003

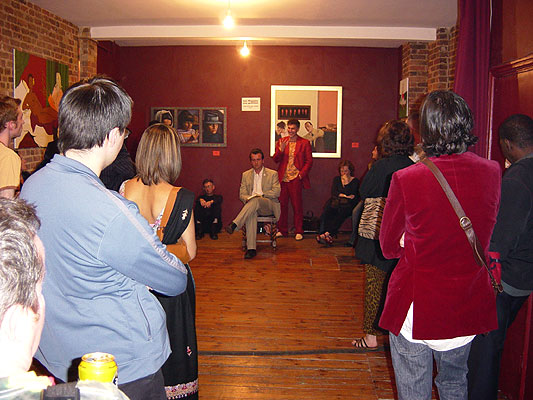
3:AM Magazine Good Sex Prize, July 2004

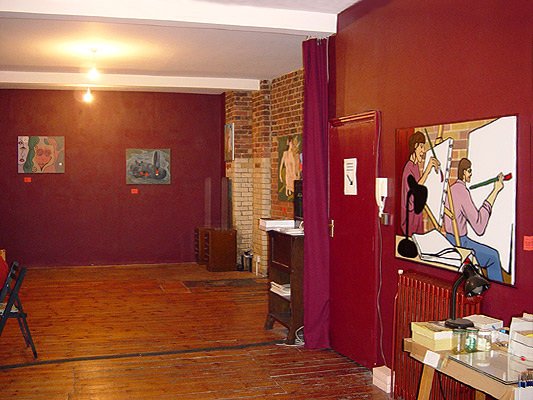
Hysterical Shock, Gina Bold, July 2004
