= Adrian Searle =

British art critic and painter (born 1953)

- Born: 1953 (age 72–73); Welwyn Garden City, Hertfordshire, England
- Education: Trent Polytechnic; Winchester School of Art
- Occupations: Art critic; painter
- Employer: The Guardian
- Children: 1

Adrian Searle (born 1953 in Welwyn Garden City, Hertfordshire) is an art critic for The Guardian, and has been writing for the paper since 1996. Previously he was a painter.

== Life and career ==
Searle studied at the St Albans School of Art (1971–72), Trent Polytechnic (1972–73) and the Winchester School of Art (1973–75). He has taught at Central St Martins College of Art (1981–94), Chelsea College of Art (1991–96) and Goldsmiths College (1993–96), De Ateliers, Amsterdam (2000–03). From 2007 to 2012 he was Visiting Professor at the Royal College of Art, London.

Searle has curated exhibitions internationally. These include:

- Promises Promises, a group exhibition at the Serpentine Gallery, London, 1989
- Unbound: Possibilities in Painting, an international exhibition, co-curated with Greg Hilty, at the Hayward Gallery, London, 1994
- Glad That Things Don't Talk, Irish Museum of Modern Art, Dublin, 2004
- Pepe Espaliú retrospective at Reina Sofia, Madrid, co-curated with Juan Vicente Aliaga, 2004
- Juan Muñoz, Marian Goodman Gallery, New York, 2006
- Julião Sarmento: Close Distance, La Casa Encendida, Madrid, 2011
- Juan Muñoz: An inaccessible moment, Frith Street Gallery, London, co-curated with Jane Hamlyn, 2012

Originally a painter, represented by Nigel Greenwood Gallery, London, and exhibiting widely, he stopped when he took up his newspaper job. He said, "I was always torn between making art and writing. Writing won." He also occasionally writes fiction.

Searle has been a juror for the Turner Prize, 2004, Paul Hamlyn Foundation, 1996, Andy Warhol Foundation/Creative Capital, 2009, and Kurt Schwitters Prize, 2009–13.

Before joining The Guardian, he wrote for The Independent, Time Out and contributed regularly to Artscribe magazine (1976–92), Artforum, and frieze.

In 2007, he was decorated Chevalier de l'Ordre des Arts et des Lettres. In 2011, Searle received an Honorary degree for Doctor of Art from Nottingham Trent University and in 2012 was made an Honorary Fellow of the University of the Arts London.

Searle is divorced. He has a daughter and two grandsons.

== Reviews ==
- Jim Shaw's ICA "Thrift Store Paintings" (2000):

1) The paintings are awful, indefensible, crapulous….these people can't draw, can't paint; these people should never be left alone with a paintbrush.
2) The Thrift Store Paintings are fascinating, alarming, troubled and funny. Scary too, just like America.

- Chris Ofili's The Upper Room (2002):

Ofili says that he was trying to do something sincere – whatever sincerity means nowadays. It would be a great pity to split The Upper Room apart, to sell the paintings one by one. The Tate should buy it. The Upper Room is better than Ofili probably realises.

- Charles Saatchi (2004):

Charles Saatchi had almost completed installing New Blood at his gallery at London's County Hall last week when we met by chance. "Let me write your review for you," he said, enraged. "I'm a cunt, this place is shit, and the artists I show are all fucked. Will that do for you?" I almost wish my views could be expressed with the same vigour, precision and exactitude. It would save a lot of time.

- The Stuckists (2004)

Once in a lifetime is too often for the Stuckists. So dreadful are they that one might be forgiven for thinking there must be something to them. There isn't, except a lot of ranting.

- Damien Hirst (2005):

The eye-candy dot paintings walked off the walls; the gore sells in buckets. But the spin paintings were always miserable and the big bronzes are boring. Nor has his art been particularly influential, or developed much. Hirst has lived his career backwards, doing his greatest work first, saving all the repetitive stuff and the juvenilia for later.

- Tracey Emin (2005):

We learn that she's "so tired and borred of masterbating". Why not just give it a break, Tray? ... This exhibition is an exhausting bender, careening from highs to lows. The lows are bad. Somehow Emin wouldn't be any good if they weren't.
