= Mandy McCartin =

English artist

- Born: 10 April 1958 (age 67); Sheffield, England
- Education: University of East London
- Known for: Painting
- Movement: Stuckism

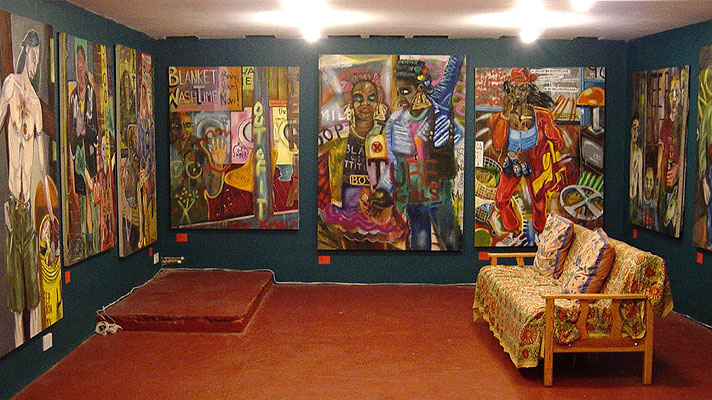
Mandy McCartin's work in the Real Turner Prize Show 2002 at the Stuckism International Gallery

Mandy McCartin (born 10 April 1958) is an English artist based in London, a "proud butch lesbian" and DJ "classic soul fanatic".

== Life and work ==
Mandy McCartin was born in Sheffield, England, and went to North East London Polytechnic (now the University of East London). She describes herself as from a working-class background and this is reflected in her images which are often of characters in inner city settings, painted in an intense way with different media including spray can graffiti.

Shows have included William Jackson Gallery (Cork Street), Whitechapel Open, Battersea Arts Centre, New Contemporaries (ICA), and James Coleman.

McCartin describes her work as paintings of "real people living on the edges of society, emotional moments in the struggle to survive."

Stuckists founder Charles Thomson has always endorsed her work and sees it as "an intense visual confection of urban life."

David Prudames has reviewed it as "snapshot images positively bustle with human activity, delving beneath the surface of city life's rougher side. Tube Girls is all attitude and Charity Shop's colourful confusion barks out aggression to the staccato rhythm of a busy street."

Noted author (and lawyer) Andrew Vachss has included McCartin on his website as one of "the artists we respect".

She has been regularly exhibited as a guest artist with the Stuckists in London. She was one of the four joint winners of their Real Turner Prize Show 2002 and was a featured artist in their major show The Stuckists Punk Victorian at the Walker Art Gallery during the 2004 Liverpool Biennial. She is not a member of the group (by choice), but "does like them".

== Books ==
- Monograph with introduction by Cherry Smyth (1996), "From the Street" éditions Aubrey Walter, London, ISBN 0-85449-195-3
- Ed. Frank Milner (2004), "The Stuckists Punk Victorian" National Museums Liverpool, ISBN 1-902700-27-9
