= Guy Denning =

English painter (born 1965)

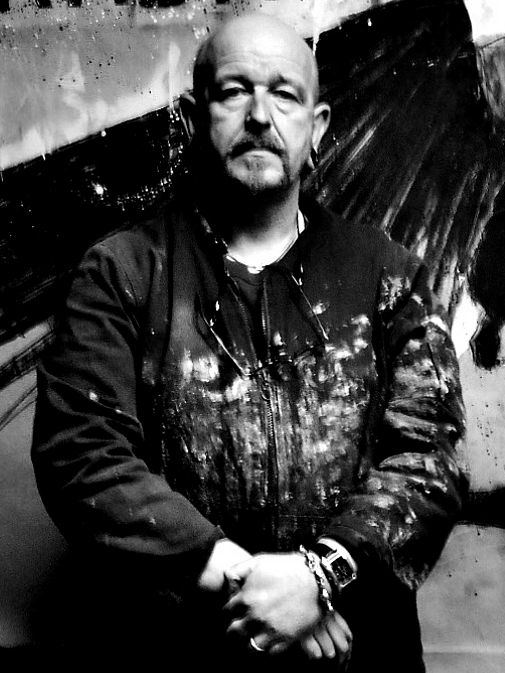
- Denning in 2015
- Born: 1965; Bristol, England
- Known for: Painting, Street art, Protest art
- Movement: Neomodern, urban art

Guy Denning (born 1965) is a self-taught English contemporary artist and painter based in France. He is the founder of the Neomodern group and part of the urban art scene in Bristol.

== Biography ==
Denning was born in Somerset, England, in October 1965. Prior to his commercial success in art he worked full-time on top of his painting at weekends and at night. He had a series of jobs, working as a roofer, general labourer, shop assistant, and pathology lab worker.

He applied to study at several art colleges during the 1980s but was refused entry.

He does not always work to set motifs, but sometimes makes paintings and drawings from observation and photographic reference.

He has stated that his work has been significantly informed by the subject of war "When I was about 11 or 12 I came to France with my parents and they took me to the war cemetery at Verdun. It was the most significant thing that ever happened to me."

Beginning in 1992, Denning has exhibited across Britain. His first solo show with Red Propeller Gallery featured paintings connected to the 9/11 terrorist attack. Although created at the time of this atrocity, Denning delayed its exhibition. The show was completely sold out.

In February 2008, he sold two works in Bonhams Urban Art auction.

Denning held a trio of international exhibitions in 2011/12 showcasing paintings interpreting Dante's Divine Comedy. The paintings examined Britain's failings and political problems. In 2013 he was one of the artists invited to participate in the Paris Tower 13 urban art project. In 2015 Denning spoke at the UNESCO presentation at the COP21 climate conference concerning artistic activism and climate change awareness.

In 2018, for the centenary of the Armistice, Denning pasted 112 life size drawings of French First World War soldiers to the walls of the village of La Feuillee to mark the loss of that particular village during the war.

== Notable solo exhibitions ==
- 2012 'Dante's Paradiso' Signal Gallery, London, UK
- 2010 'Behemoth' Red Propeller Gallery/The Crypt Gallery, St Martin in the Fields, London, UK
