= Charles Williams (artist) =

British artist

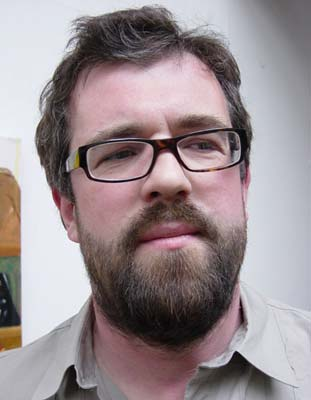
- Photo of Charles Williams by Charles Thomson
- Born: 16 March 1965 (age 61); Evanston, Illinois, USA
- Education: Maidstone College of Art, Royal Academy of Art
- Known for: Painting
- Movement: Stuckism

Charles Williams (born 16 March 1965) is a British artist. He is a founding member of the Stuckist art group and a member of the New English Art Club.

== Life and work ==
Born in Evanston, Illinois, Williams is a British artist. A former student at the Royal Academy Schools, and a founder member of the Stuckist art movement, his work has been exhibited in the UK, Europe, and the United States. While most of his career has been directly involved in the art world, painting and exhibiting in London, the UK and the wider world, he has also had a ten-year career in teaching visual art in Higher Education.

Formerly Programme Director of Fine Art at Canterbury Christ Church University, he was a PhD scholar there between 2018 and 2021, completing an autoethnographic investigation into his painting in 2023. This year he was elected President of the Royal Watercolour Society. Exhibitions include RA Summer Exhibition, Hunting Prize, Lynn Painter Stainers, Threadneedle Prize, The Marmite Prize, and the John Moore’s. Galleries include Lily Zeligmann Gallery in the Netherlands, John Martin of London, Charlie Dutton Gallery, and solo shows at, among others, the Bakersfield Museum of Modern Art, Cal., USA. He is currently represented by New Arts Projects in London.

Williams is a painter who also writes. In his work, the possibility of presence in the two- dimensional arena of painting wrestles with scale and material. Narrative, surface, and image are knitted together in an unfolding improvisation, taking in his hapless attempts to thrive in the Art World, from being a West End Gallery Artist to teaching art in care homes and being Louise Bourgeois’ most inept studio assistant. Recent work has taken him into the world of therianthropy. He works alone in his studio, but sometimes in collaboration with self- styled con-artist Dan Devlin, who published Talking to Louise Bourgeois with www.susakpress.com. They worked together on The Lost Paintings Of Herzog Dellafiore, also available on www.susakpress.com.

‘My work is a dialogue between me in my studio and paintings that seem to gain holds on me – Joseph Highmore’s Mr Oldham And His Guests, Annibale Carracci’s The Butcher’s Shop, Daniel Stringer’s 1776 self-portrait for example – and stories and ideas that swill around in my imagination and memory. Evelyn Waugh described his friend Anthony Powell’s fictional characters as being like fish that come towards you in their tank, look at you for a while and then disappear in the murk, and that seems an apt analogy to my painting process.’ April 2023

His book, Basic Drawing (pub. Robert Hale), summing up his teaching methods, was published in September 2011, and the follow-up, Basic Watercolour was published in 2014.

== See also ==
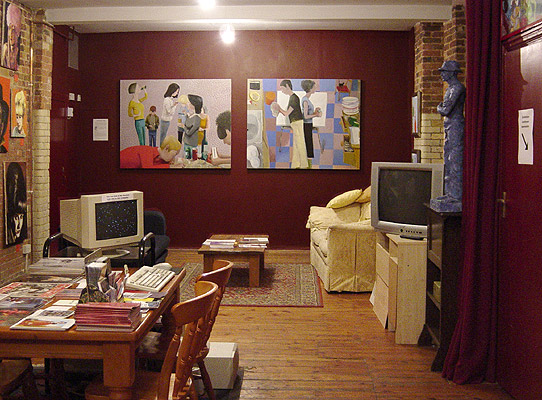
Charles Williams paintings (back wall) during the Real Turner Prize Show 2002 at the Stuckism International Gallery.

- Stuckism
- New English Art Club
- Royal Watercolour Society

== Sources ==
- Ed. Katherine Evans (2000), The Stuckists, Victoria Press, ISBN 0-907165-27-3
- Ed. Frank Milner (2004), The Stuckists Punk Victorian, National Museums Liverpool, ISBN 1-902700-27-9
