= Wolf Howard =

English painter

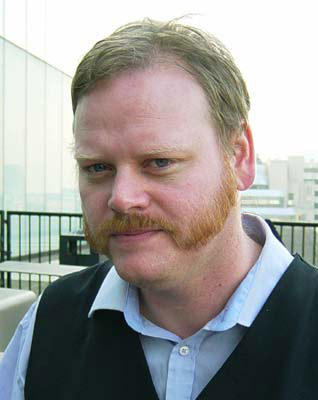
- Photograph of Wolf Howard by Charles Thomson. 2008
- Born: 7 April 1968 (age 58); Strood, Kent, England
- Education: No formal art training
- Known for: Drums, painting, photography
- Movement: Stuckism (1999–2006)

Wolf Howard (born 7 April 1968) is an English artist, poet and filmmaker living in Rochester, Kent and was a founder member of the Stuckists art group. He is also a drummer who has played in garage and punk bands, currently as a member of The Musicians of the British Empire (MBE's) with Billy Childish.

== Life ==
Simon 'Wolf' Howard was born in Strood, Kent and attended Mid-Kent College for O-levels, where he "doesn't think he got any but always tells people he got two". In 1986 he began drumming, having taught himself, and has continued to do so ever since. From 1987 for 15 years he was on the dole, except for a total of two periods of two months, one day and half-an-hour, when he was respectively sweeping an ironmonger's warehouse floor, sweeping a neon light warehouse floor, picking apples and working in a frozen shepherds-pie factory. He decided against going to art college on the basis that it would "worsen himself". He lives in Chatham, where he works as a volunteer in an Oxfam shop.

== Music ==
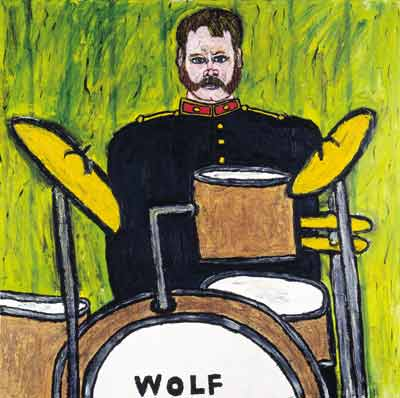
Wolf Howard. Wolf Howard on Drums

Wolf Howard has played drums in many bands. The most important are (in chronological order) The Daggermen, The James Taylor Quartet, The Prime Movers, The Solarflares, Dodsons Dogs and The Buff Medways. His drumming is "louder than a self-propelled Howitzer."

== Art ==
Howard was one of the 13 original founder members of the Stuckists, a pro-figurative painting, anti-conceptual art group, co-founded by Childish and Charles Thomson in 1999. Howard exhibited in group shows, including The Stuckists Punk Victorian (2004) at the Walker Art Gallery for the Liverpool Biennial and Go West at Spectrum London (2006). He left the group in 2006 to pursue a solo career.

He paints bold figurative images in a simple, vigorous, impasto style. This has incurred criticism for its apparent naivety. Howard has stated that his finished result only comes about after hard work, which can involve scraping the paint back to the canvas up to ten times.

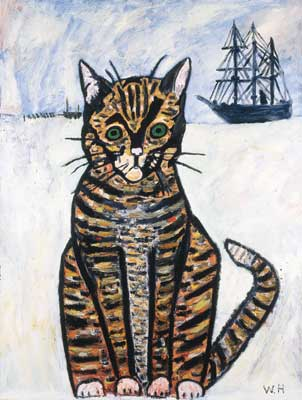
Wolf Howard. Mrs Chippy

He has explained a particular painting, Mrs Chippy:

People have said do me, ‘What’s the point in painting a cat? My five-year-old daughter could do that.’ Yes, she could, but would it be a cat that had the look in its eyes that conveyed to you that it was about to be shot? That’s the fate that befell Mrs Chippy during one of the greatest survival adventures ever—Ernest Shackleton’s voyage to the Antarctic in 1914 on the ship Endurance—shown in the background of the painting, stuck in the ice, as the crew drag the small open boat which later accomplished an 850-mile rescue journey through sixty-foot waves. That’s the difference between my cat and a five-year-old’s. … I also paint cats where there is no difference.

In Aesthetica magazine, Abby Jackson contrasted the different responses of Howard and Luc Tuymans to the subject of 9/11: "Tuymans chooses to avoid his subject matter, whereas Howard, as a Stuckist, approaches his subject head on."

== Pinhole photography ==
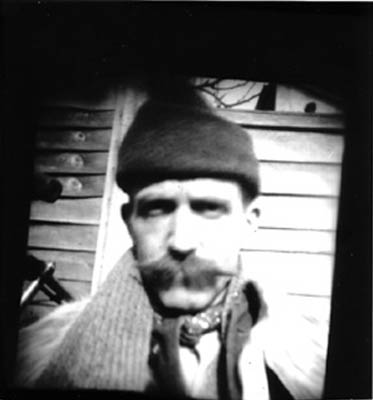
Pinhole photograph of Billy Childish by Wolf Howard

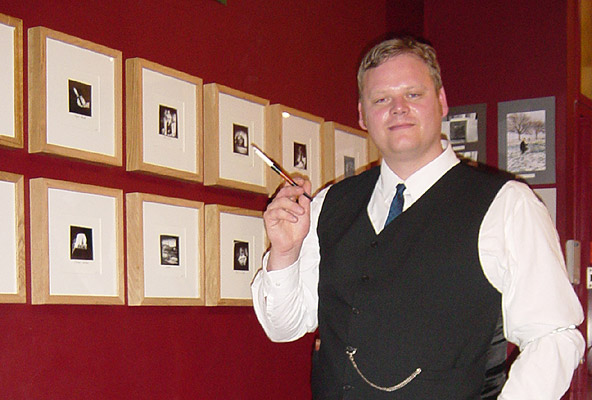
The Pinhole Photography of a Gifted Gentleman Amateur, show by Wolf Howard, Stuckism International Gallery, 2003.

Wolf Howard is a member of the Stuckism Photography group and takes pinhole photographs. He uses a light-proof wooden box 4" square with a fixed-size pinhole in the front. Photographic paper is placed at the back of the box. There is no lens and no viewfinder, so he estimates the aim of the camera. A wooden slider allows light into the box for an exposure which is between 40 seconds and 5 minutes. The camera is placed inside a light-proof bag to replace the photographic paper.

He develops a negative print (in his bathroom) and makes the final positive print by placing another sheet of photographic paper under the negative with a 5-second exposure under a light bulb. The whole process requires estimation throughout and he "faces many disappointments in his darkroom. The hard work will eventually pay off."

He describes his motivation:

There is something special about a pinhole camera. There is a beauty in its simplicity and rawness that technology has not been able to better. There is a timeless quality that can make the most uncomplicated subject seem full of poetry.

In each pinhole picture I take I hope to capture the joy and excitement that the early pioneering photographers (Fox Talbot and friends) must have felt when they took and developed photographs for the very first time.

An exhibition of his work, The Pinhole Photographs of a Gifted Gentleman Amateur, was held at the Stuckism International Gallery in 2003 as part of Alternative Arts Photomonth. He was one of the four Stuckist Photographers showing work at the Lady Lever Art Gallery during the 2004 Liverpool Biennial. Jesse Richards wrote in a review of the show, "Wolf Howard's pinhole photographs of a pocket watch, a trench cap, and his friend Billy Childish are beautiful haunting images that seem to be from a world long gone by. I've really never seen anything like it."

== Gallery ==
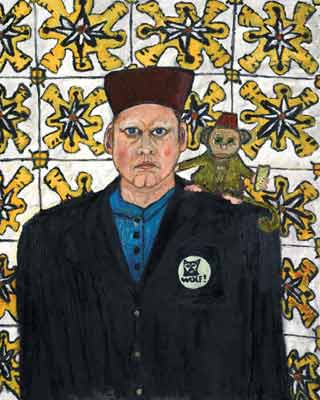
Wolf in Tunisia

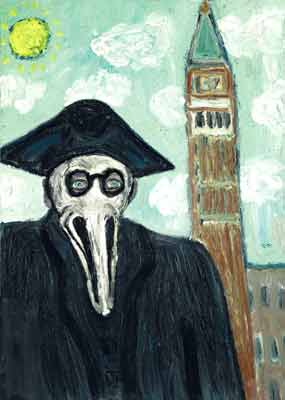
Venice Mask

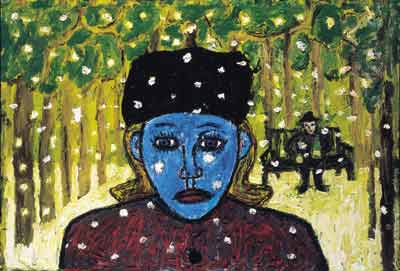
Russian Girl

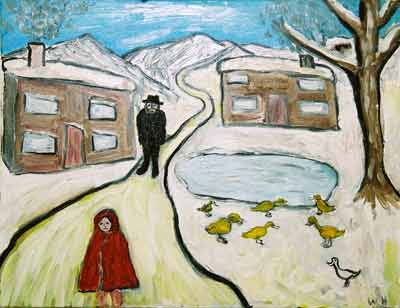
Hunger

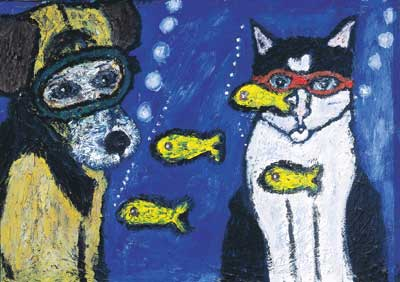
Dog and Cat Underwater

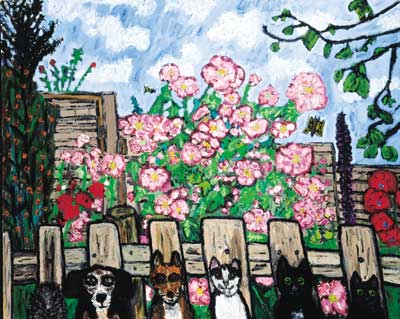
Firing Squad

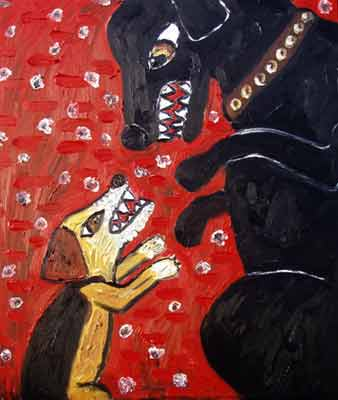
Two Dogs Fighting

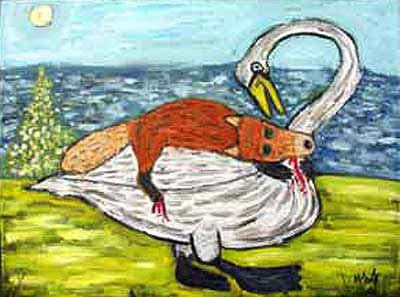
Swan and Fox

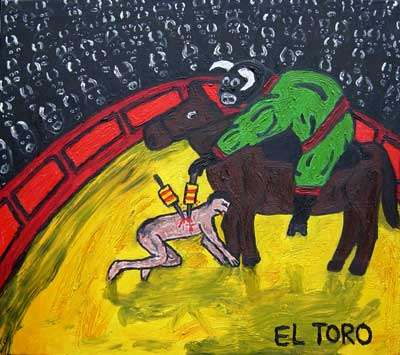
El Toro

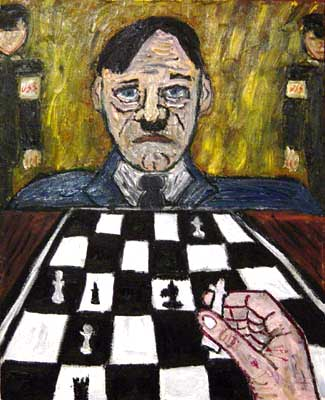
Being on the Dole is like Playing Chess with Hitler

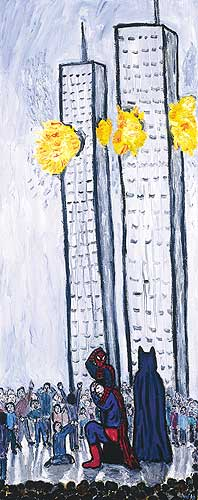
Superpowerless

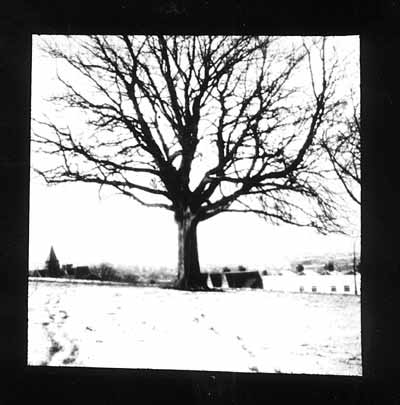
Tree in Snow (pinhole photograph)

== See also ==
- Stuckism
- The Stuckists Punk Victorian
- Stuckism Photography
- Pinhole Photography
