= Jane Kelly (artist) =

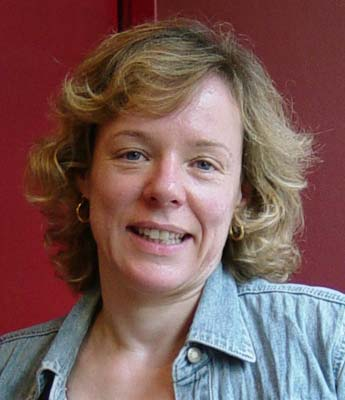
- Jane Kelly
- Born: 7 May 1956 (age 70); Charlton, London, England
- Education: Central Saint Martins College of Art and Design; Royal Central School of Speech and Drama
- Known for: Painting
- Notable work: If We Could Undo Psychosis 2, Paul Dacre's Prawn Cocktail
- Movement: Stuckism

Jane Kelly (born 7 May 1956) is a journalist and artist, affiliated with the Stuckist art group. She was dismissed from the Daily Mail after exhibiting a painting of serial killer Myra Hindley.

== Life and work ==
Jane Kelly was born in Charlton, London, and educated at Pendeford High School, Wolverhampton, and Stirling University, where she graduated in 1978 in history and fine art. 1978–79 she taught in Sosnowiec University, Poland, since when she has worked as a journalist, including the Walsall Observer, The Times, The Daily Telegraph, Daily Mail, The Guardian and Daily Express. She said:

In the 1970s it was Lynda Lee-Potter against Jean Rook on the Daily Express, and we younger women writers all thought we would inherit that. But it's faded out. There's been a change in editorial approach. Perhaps lippy women aren't as much of a draw as they were.

In 1995, she took an Advanced Diploma in Painting at the Central Saint Martins College of Art and Design, London. In 2000, she exhibited in the Royal Academy Summer Show. The same year, she was a guest artist of the Stuckist art group, and in 2003 founded The Acton Stuckists group.

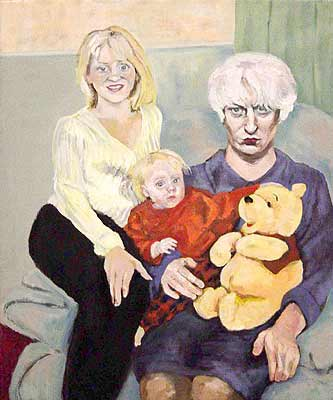
Jane Kelly. If We Could Undo Psychosis 2.

In 2004, she was an exhibitor in The Stuckists Punk Victorian show at the Walker Art Gallery during the 2004 Liverpool Biennial. At the time she was a writer on the Daily Mail, but was dismissed after a painting by her, If We Could Undo Psychosis 2 featuring Myra Hindley, was exhibited in the show. The painting shows a family group of a mother and child with child-killer Myra Hindley substituted for the father and holding a teddy bear. The incident was reported on the front page of The Guardian newspaper, which commented:

Stuckism, the art movement founded by Tracey Emin's former boyfriend to oppose the pretensions of Britart, claims to advocate 'honest, uncensored expression'. Unfortunately, the Daily Mail does not appear to share those values.

It described how the paper welcomed a previous work exhibited at the Royal Academy Summer Show by Kelly showing London Mayor Ken Livingstone in the context of the 1944 Stauffenberg plot against Hitler. The Daily Mail's managing editor, Lawrence Sear, who dismissed Kelly, described as "absolute rubbish" the claim that the loss of her job was related to her artwork.

She has said that she was never given a full reason for her dismissal, but that she had previously also got into trouble by trying to introduce the term "German expressionism" into some copy about the performing dwarves used in the MGM film, The Wizard of Oz, some of whom came from Weimar Germany. She said that the acting feature editor at the time had never heard of such a thing and told her "what the fuck is German Expressionism? I have never heard of it and neither have our fucking readers." Her own explanation of her painting in the show catalogue was:

I've always been fascinated by Myra Hindley's disastrous life and because hers was the first horrible crime I knew about as a child. I wanted to see what she might have looked like in the kind of family situation she was always denied.

The painting sold to a European Union Commissioner for £3,500.

In December 2006, her show, Stupid English Men, was held in a Brighton gallery, Art Café. Her painting of Tim Walker, The Sunday Telegraph's theatre critic and diarist, was stolen from the gallery.

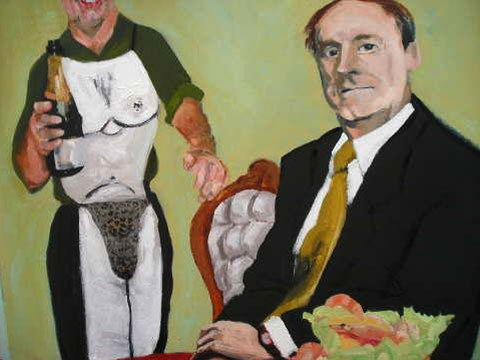
Jane Kelly. Paul Dacre's Prawn Cocktail.

In August 2007, she appeared in the documentary, The Daily Mail Diet, on Al Gore's Current TV internet video site, where she showed a painting of Daily Mail editor, Paul Dacre behind a prawn cocktail, which Kelly said represented "a little bit of taste, but very predictable, bland and no surprises—it's from a different age where people had a more limited palate", and that she had depicted him as a stern figure as he "loves the 50s he wants people to go back to a time of discipline". She explains the other figure in the painting: "The Mail has always been slightly prurient and a bit scared of sex and I wanted this figure to represent that—it's slightly nasty and a bit threatening." The documentary, on the same principle as the film Super Size Me, showed film maker Nick Angel consuming only one news product—the Daily Mail—for four weeks, a diet, which Kelly considered, "dangerous—it would be like eating hamburgers and nothing else—you're starving yourself." The Guardian challenged Daily Mail journalists to print out her picture and post it on the newsroom wall.

Kelly's work is mainly preoccupied with The Holocaust and she sees herself as a "post-holocaust painter". She has visited Zandvoort beach, 15 minutes from Amsterdam, where Anne Frank used to go regularly as a child, accompanied by her family. Kelly made a painting based on this visit which was auctioned by Sotheby's in Belfast on 28 April 2006, in aid of victims of trauma. The painting was sold for £1,500 to an Irish collector. Kelly said, "It was rather a lonely job going out to Zandvoort to make the drawings for the painting and sometimes I doubted my sanity in doing it at all."

Her work has been shown at the Cristus Gallery, Sandgate, The Royal Academy Summer Show, The Walker Art Gallery, Liverpool, The White Cube, London, the Sackville Gallery, London, the Excel Centre, Manchester, the MacRobert Arts Centre, Stirling and the Wolverhampton City Art Gallery.

In May 2010, she was diagnosed with ovarian cancer. She has kept a blog on her dealings with the NHS called Icantbelieveitsreallycancer.

== Gallery ==
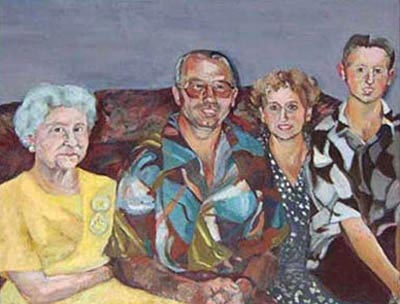
Happy Family

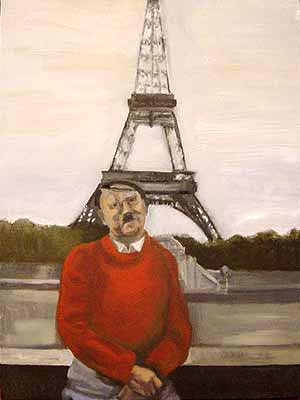
If We Could Undo Psychosis 1

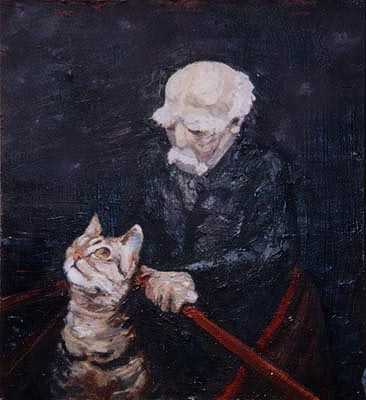
Death of Sandy

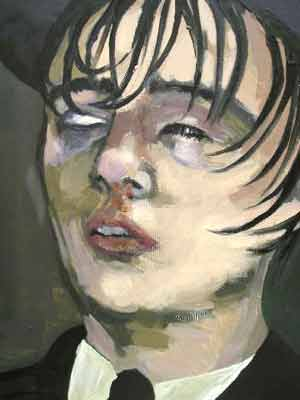
You're in My Blood You Fuck

== See also ==
- Portrait painting
