= The Upper Room (paintings) =

Art installation

The Upper Room by Chris Ofili.

The Upper Room is an installation of 13 paintings of rhesus macaque monkeys by English artist Chris Ofili in a specially designed room. It was bought by the Tate gallery in 2005 from the Victoria Miro Gallery and was the cause of a media furore after a campaign initiated by the Stuckist art group as Ofili was on the board of Tate trustees at the time of the purchase. In 2006 the Charity Commission censured the Tate for the purchase, but did not revoke it.

== The work ==
Mono Turquesa by Chris Ofili, 1992–2002. One of thirteen paintings in The Upper Room.

A large walnut-panelled room designed by architect David Adjaye holds the paintings. The room is approached through a dimly-lit corridor, which is designed to give a sense of anticipation. There are thirteen paintings altogether, six along each of two long facing walls, and a larger one at the shorter far end wall.

Each painting depicts a monkey based around a different colour theme (grey, red, white etc.). The twelve smaller paintings show a monkey from the side and they are based on a 1957 Andy Warhol drawing. The larger monkey is depicted from the front. Each painting is individually spotlit in the otherwise darkened room. The room is designed to create an impressive and contemplative atmosphere.

The paintings each rest on two round lumps of elephant dung, treated and coated in resin. There is also a lump of the dung on each painting. Strictly speaking, each work is mixed media, comprising paint, resin, glitter, mapping pins and elephant dung. The Upper Room as a whole is described by the Tate as an "installation".

The Upper Room is a reference to the Biblical Last Supper of Jesus and his disciples, hence the thirteen paintings. Ofili states the work is not intended to be offensive, but rather to contrast the harmonious life of the monkeys with the travails of the human race.

== Background ==
The work was first exhibited at the Victoria Miro Gallery in a solo show Freedom One Day in 2002, when it generally received very favourable reviews, especially from Adrian Searle, art critic of The Guardian, who wrote, "It is certainly the bravest, and one of the most original works I have seen by a painter for years ... It would be a great pity to split The Upper Room apart, to sell the paintings one by one. The Tate should buy it."

Negotiations began between Victoria Miro and the Tate in 2002, but it was not until 2005 that the work was finally purchased. In July 2005 this was publicly announced as part of the new BP-sponsored rehang of Tate Britain. Again reviews were mostly favourable.

== Controversy ==
In the same week as announcing the purchase, the Tate rejected a donation of 160 Stuckist paintings valued at £500,000 and was accused of "snubbing one of Britain’s foremost collections", the Walker Art Gallery, where the work had been in The Stuckists Punk Victorian show. This led Stuckist co-founder Charles Thomson to investigate the trustees who had ratified the decision and he found that Ofili was one of them.

I don't think many people realise how the Tate is run—I certainly didn't. Serota, as the director, chooses the trustees, and the trustees are then responsible for reappointing the director. The director then buys the trustees' work. There is nominally an external inspector, but in practice there are very few checks. Basically the Tate are appointing their own bosses. (Note: In October 2008 in Varsity Serota refuted this statement, saying, "I don't have any part to play in their [the trustees'] appointment." Thomson responded in 3:AM Magazine, quoting Tate trustee minutes, where Serota had interviewed prospective trustees.)

— Charles Thomson, The Observer

He applied to the Tate under the UK Freedom of Information Act 2000, and the museum was forced to release previously confidential trustee minutes relating to the purchase, as well as revealing that £100,000 had been donated by Tate Members towards it. The minutes showed that the Tate had begun negotiations with Ofili's dealer to purchase The Upper Room when an unnamed American collector was going to enter into a joint purchase with the museum. When this fell through, Ofili's dealer Victoria Miro then organised a consortium of five benefactors to donate half the purchase price, whilst also buying their own Ofili work privately. The Stuckists then led a media campaign over the Tate's purchase of The Upper Room.

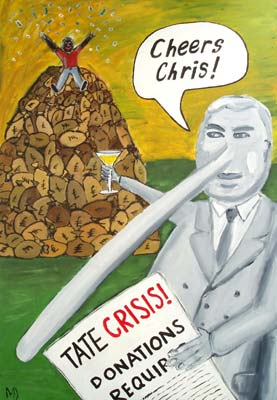
The Hypocrisy of Myners, a painting by Stuckist artist, Mark D, used on a protest placard. (Paul Myners is the Tate Chairman.)

On 14 August 2005 The Sunday Telegraph published an article by their arts correspondent, Chris Hastings, with the heading, "Chris Ofili said artists should give work to the Tate for nothing... so why has he accepted £100,000 for one of his dung pictures?" It expressed criticism of the Tate's purchase, because Ofili was a serving trustee (which had not previously been mentioned in the press), and, furthermore, the previous year had urged other artists to donate work to the Tate because of a shortage of funds to buy new acquisitions.

There followed a series of articles in The Sunday Telegraph, as well as other newspapers, over the following few months, detailing more aspects of the purchase. Initially the Tate had attempted to reduce the price, but Miro refused: she said she had lowered it from the price she originally wanted of £750,000 to £600,000 (making £705,000, including VAT).

The Sunday Telegraph obtained an email sent by Miro to Serota in November 2002:

There is also extra pressure as Chris is getting married next week and I suspect he may be less willing than previously to wait for an extended period in terms of finance. Evidently, especially as Chris is a trustee, this is a sensitive situation, but if you could give me some indication as to which way to proceed, I will ensure that your decision is handled with discretion. Ideally I would still love the work to go to the Tate.

Serota said Miro would have to find half the cost, and she obtained £300,000 in donations towards the purchase from five anonymous private benefactors, several of whom were also buying their own Ofili work. The revelation of this arrangement caused questions to be raised in the press as to whether the private benefactors knew privileged information, and if they anticipated a profit through the increased value of Ofili's work after the Tate purchase.

Richard Dorment, art critic of The Daily Telegraph, said The Upper Room was "one of the most important works of British art painted in the last 25 years," that the Tate had got "the bargain of the century," and "If you ask me, Miro and Ofili deserve medals for acting not in their own interests but for the public good." The Times said, "Victoria Miro, Mr Ofili’s dealer, appears to have driven a hard bargain with the Tate, which is the job of a clever dealer." Charles Thomson, co-founder of the Stuckists, said, "Sir Nicholas Serota mentions Victoria Miro's generosity in constructing this deal. Victoria Miro’s 'generosity' would seem to be in attracting benefactors who will give money to the Tate—so that the Tate can then give it back to her."

In September 2005, Serota wrote to the Department of Culture, Media and Sport (DCMS), assuring them that this purchase of a serving trustee's work was "exceptional" and had happened on only one other occasion. David Lee, editor of The Jackdaw magazine, showed that the Tate had acquired work by six serving artist trustees, in one case 50 works. The Art Newspaper pointed out that work by every serving artist trustee had been acquired during Serota's tenure. Official DCMS guidelines caution against commercial transactions with trustees: "even the perception of a conflict of interest in relation to a board member can be extremely damaging to the body’s reputation."

In December 2005, Serota admitted that he had filled in with false information an application form to the Art Fund (NACF) for a £75,000 grant towards buying the work. He had stated that the Tate had made no prior commitment to purchase the work, whereas they had in fact already paid a first instalment of £250,000 several months previously. He attributed this to "a failing in his head". Revelation of the application also raised the issue that the current chairman of NACF David Verey was until 2004 Chairman of the Tate Trustees. The NACF allowed the Tate to keep the grant.

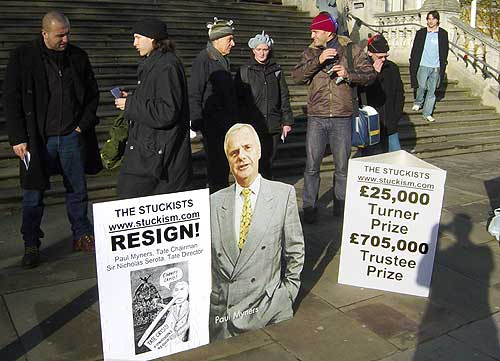
Outside the Turner Prize, Tate Britain, 2005: Stuckists demonstrate against the purchase of Chris Ofili's The Upper Room. The cutout is Tate Chairman Paul Myners.

The Stuckists demonstrated outside the Turner Prize on 6 December 2005 against the purchase of The Upper Room with slogans such as "£25,000 Turner Prize, £705,000 Trustee Prize", and were approached by Serota, who became tense, according to Stuckist leader, Thomson. In front of guests at the award ceremony that evening, in what was described as a "moment of rare passion" and an "unusual, possibly unprecedented" move, he spoke out with "an angry defence" of the purchase, saying, "I defy anybody who has actually taken the time and trouble to see the work not to agree with the trustees' decision to acquire this most extraordinary and important piece of work."

Christopher McCall QC wrote to The Times alleging that the purchase of a trustee's work in these circumstances was a breach of charity law. In addition to the problems concerning the purchase of the work, difficulties were also found in the display of the work. A leaked Tate Conservator's report mentioned (potential) damage due to the lighting level and that the work might have to be removed from display. It was out of commission for a short time, due to the lights not working properly.

The total sale price of The Upper Room was £705,000, costing the Tate £600,000 as VAT could be reclaimed. The Stuckists have also pointed out that, during the period of the negotiations, works by the artist had suffered a decline in price, but had doubled after it.

Chris Ofili's term of office as a trustee expired in November 2005. He was replaced by Anish Kapoor.

In July 2006 the Charity Commission completed an investigation into The Tate's purchase of Ofili and other trustees' work, censuring the gallery for acting outside its legal powers. It ruled the Tate had broken charity law (but not the criminal law) over the purchase and similar trustee purchases, including ones made before Serota's Directorship. The Daily Telegraph called the verdict "one of the most serious indictments of the running of one of the nation's major cultural institutions in living memory."
