= Gina Bold =

English artist and poet

- Inner dealer by Gina Bold
- Born: London, England
- Education: Self taught artist
- Known for: Painting/Outsider art
- Notable work: 'The Wedding Photo After The Divorce'

Gina Bold is an English artist/poet, who makes paintings, stained glass and sculpture. She was an artist in residence at Arlington House from May to November 2007.

== Life and work ==
Gina Bold was born in London to a Greek mother and Scottish father and lived in Abbey Road, London. She studied fashion at Kilburn Polytechnic and pattern cutting. She started painting in 1987 with the encouragement of personal friend Shaun Parry-Jones. In 1993, she attended the Mary Ward Center and learned how to make stained glass windows. She started to make small sculptures in 2006. She was exhibited for the first time in 2002 by Barnet College and also at the Stuckism International Gallery.

In 2007, she held her first solo show, Born to Be Bold, at the Arlington Gallery in Camden Town, London. The show consisted of 67 paintings and 10 sculptures.

== Shows ==
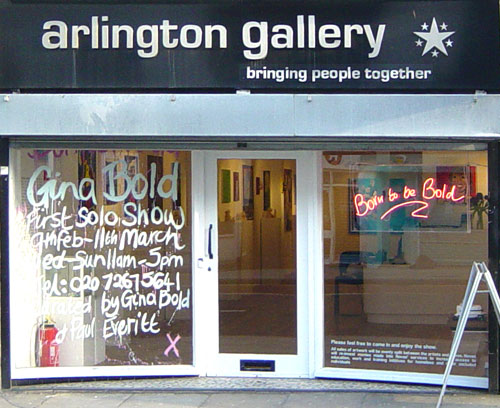
The Arlington Gallery, Camden, London, during "Born to Be Bold"

- 2002: Barnet college end of term show
- 2002: The First Stuckist International (guest artist)
- 2002: F-EST
- 2003: Art4All, Prince's Trust.
- 2003: Kith and Kids charity show
- 2003: Stuck in Wednesbury (guest artist)
- 2004: The Clifton, St Johns Wood, London, solo show
- 2004: ODPM with Vision Impossible (group show)
- 2005: Bull and Last, Highgate Road (solo show)
- 2007: Born to Be Bold (solo)
- 2007: The Other Side Gallery Christmas fair, Novas Gallery (group show)
- 2008: Spirit of Arlington: (group show)
- 2009: A Bite of Bold: (solo show)
- 2009: Bold in the Basement: (solo show)
- 2009: Bold 'n' Blue: (solo show) Charlotte Street Blues, London
- 2009: Outside In: (group show)Pallent House Gallery, Chichester
