= List of Stuckist shows =

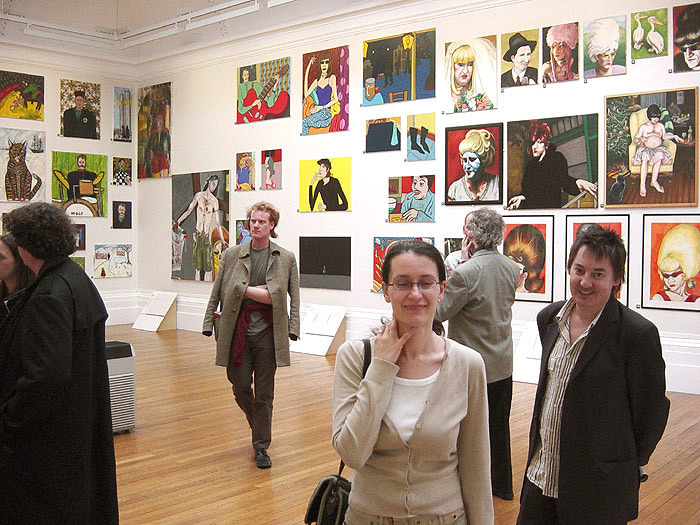
The Stuckists Punk Victorian show at the Walker Art Gallery, Liverpool, 2004.

This page is a list of group shows of the Stuckism International art movement.

--List==

Australia

- 2000 - The Real Turner Prize Show
- 2002 - Stuck Down South

Belgium

- 2006 - United Colours ltd. in Brussels

Czech

- 2007 - Stuck in the Middle of November
- 2008 - Between dream and reality
- 2008 - Stuck in the Middle of November II
- 2010 - Private landscapes
- 2010 - Stuck at the National gallery
- 2011 - Prague Stuckists
- 2012 - Stuck in the Castle

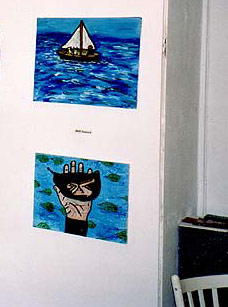
First Stuckist Show in Paris, curated by Elsa Dax. Paintings by Wolf Howard.

France

- 2001 - First Stuckist Show in Paris
- 2005 - Les Stuckistes A Paris

Germany

- 2000 - Stuckism in Germany
- 2000 - Stuck in Freiburg
- 2000 - Stuck in Köln
- 2004 - Stuckists in the Walker—Stuckists in Lewenhagen
- 2006 - Stuckomenta I in Hamburg
- 2006 - Stuckomenta II in Lewenhagen
- 2007 - Stuckomenta III in Munich
- 2007 - Flotter stuckistischer Dreier in Hamburg

Greece

- 2010 - Under the Cover of Romantic Anonymity: The 1st Stuckist Event in Greece

Iran

- 2010 - Tehran Stuckists: Searching for the Unlimited Potentials of Figurative Painting
- 2013 - International Stuckists: Painters Out of Order

Spain

- 2009 - Catalonia Stuckists
- 2009 - Catalonia Stuckists: Stuckist Fest Anniversary 2009
- 2009 - The Negation of the Anti-art: All the Paintings We Have ever Done
- 2012 - Remodernist Artists Against Rubbish

UK

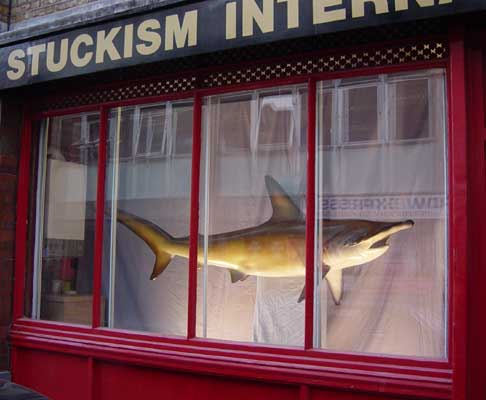
A Dead Shark Isn't Art, show at Stuckism International Gallery, 2003

- 1999 - Stuck! Stuck! Stuck!
- 2000 - The First Art Show Of the New Millennium
- 2000 - The Resignation of Sir Nicholas Serota
- 2000 - Students for Stuckism: A Remodernist Painting Show and Talk
- 2000 - Stuck!
- 2000 - The Real Turner Prize Show
- 2001 - The Stuckists: The First Remodernist Art Group
- 2001 - The Oxford Stuckists First Exhibition
- 2001 - Vote Stuckist
- 2001 - Stuck in Worthing
- 2002 - Stuck Up North!
- 2002 - I Don't Want a Painting Degree if it Means Not Painting
- 2002 - The First Stuckist International
- 2003 - A Dead Shark Isn't Art

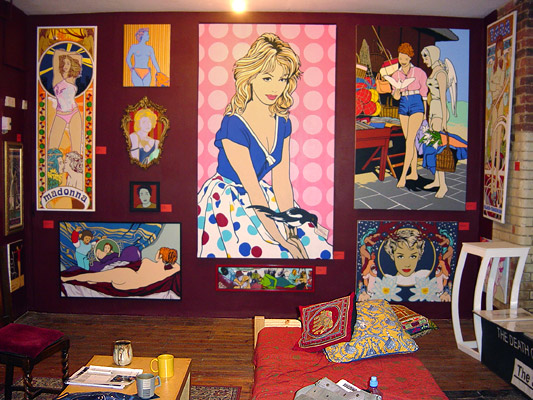
The Stuckists Summer Show, 2003

- 2003 - The Stuckists Summer Show
- 2003 - Stuck in Worthing, Again
- 2003 - Stuck in Wednesbury
- 2003 - War on Blair
- 2004 - Members Only: the Artist Group in Contemporary Japan and Britain
- 2004 - Stuckist Classics
- 2004 - The Stuckists Punk Victorian
- 2004 - "Stigmata" or "Censorious": The Stuckists Punk Victorian
- 2004 - Stuck in the Country
- 2004 - Stuckist Punk Victorian Lite If You Can't Be Bothered to Go to Liverpool
- 2004 - More of the Welsh Bit of the Stuckists Punk Victorian

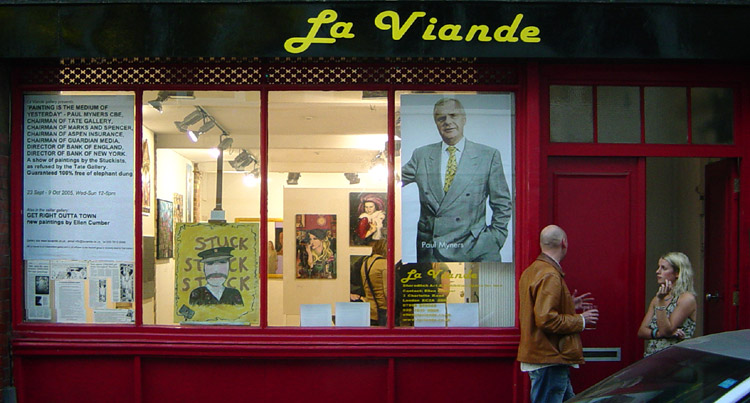
Painting is the Medium of Yesterday, La Viande, London, 2005

- 2005 - "Painting Is the Medium of Yesterday"—Paul Myners CBE, Chairman of Tate Gallery, Chairman of Marks and Spencer, Chairman of Aspen Insurance, Chairman of Guardian Media, Director of Bank of England, Director of Bank of New York. A Show of Paintings by the Stuckists, as Refused by the Tate Gallery. Guaranteed 100% Free of Elephant Dung.
- 2006 - Go West
- 2006 - The Triumph of Stuckism
- 2007 - Mark D and the Stuckists vs Tracey Emin and Damien Hirst
- 2007 - I Won't Have Sex with You as Long as We're Married
- 2008 - An Antidote to the Ghastly Turner Prize
- 2010 - The Enemies of Art
- 2010 - Stuckist Clowns Doing Their Dirty Work
- 2011 - Stuck on the Wall: The Young and the Old
- 2011 - The Enemies of Art

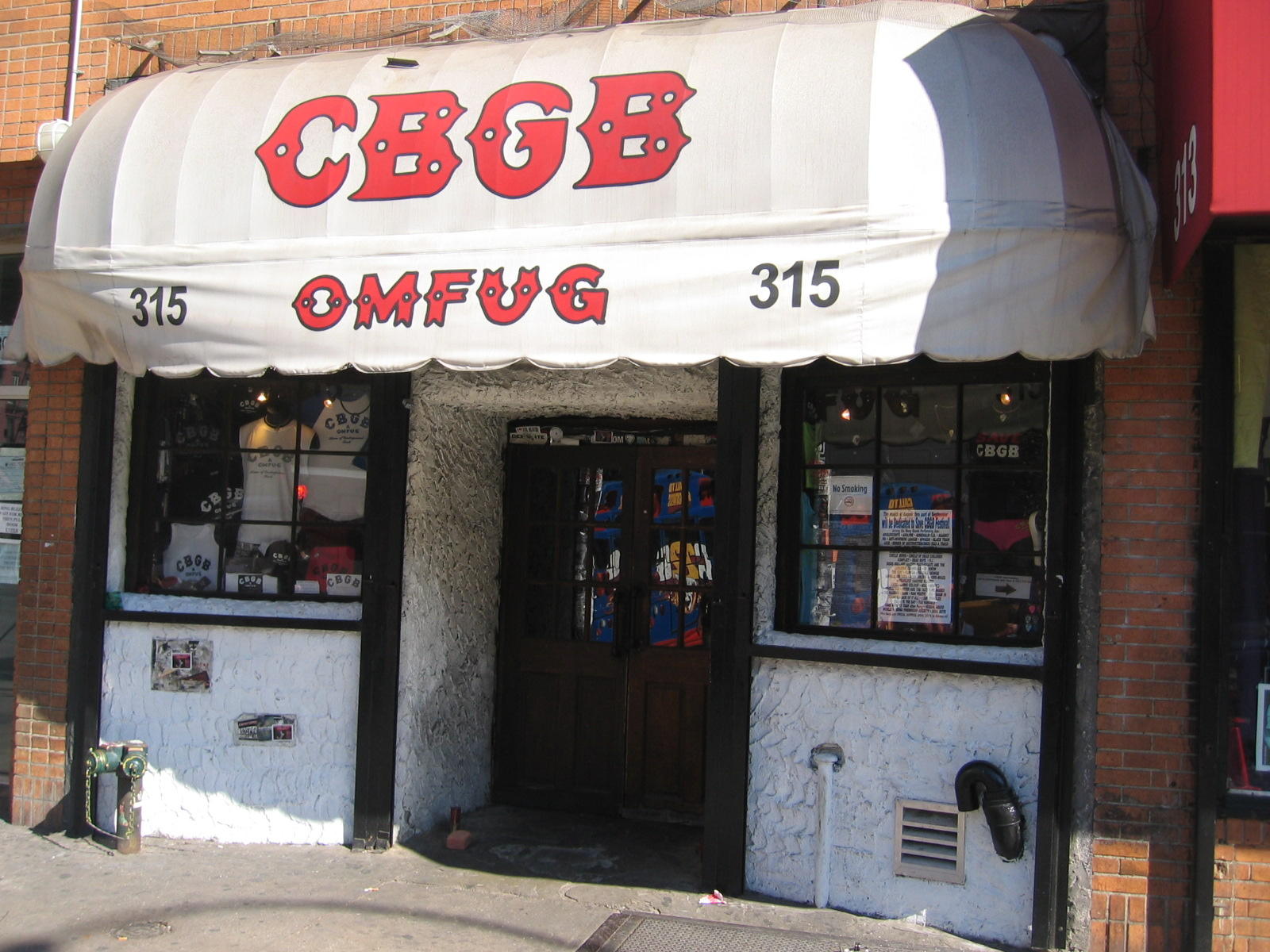
CBGB, New York, venue for Addressing the Shadow and Making Friends with Wild Dogs: Remodernism, 2005

- 2014 - Crazy Over You

US

- 2001 - Touring Show
- 2002 - Stuckist Paintings at the Fringe
- 2002 - We Just Wanna Show Some Fuckin' Paintings
- 2003 - War on Bush
- 2004 - The Stuckists Punk Victorian in the Toilet
- 2005 - Addressing the Shadow and Making Friends with Wild Dogs: Remodernism
- 2009 - New Life: The Premiere Exhibition of the Miami Stuckists
- 2010 - Stuck in Fort Lauderdale: The Raving Reactionary Miami Stuckist Daubers
