= Peter Murphy (artist) =

British artist

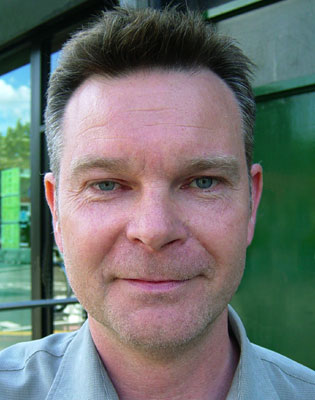
- Born: 1959
- Known for: Painting
- Movement: Stuckism

Peter Murphy (born 1959) is a British artist working in traditional egg tempera and gold leaf techniques, and a member of the Stuckist art movement.

== Life and work ==
Peter Murphy was born in Leeds, England, and studied at Jacob Kramer College of Art and the University of East London. He trained with iconographer Guillem Ramos-Poquí.

Murphy uses traditional techniques from medieval altar painting, including egg tempera paint and gilding with gold leaf. He is a member of the Society of Tempera Painters and runs courses teaching these traditional techniques. He has led workshops in Byzantine painting techniques on the Greek island of Skyros.

Byzantine Virgin of Loving Tenderness, date unknown.

He has been commissioned by a number of churches in the UK, notably Tewkesbury Abbey and the church of St Mary Redcliffe in Bristol. He has also been employed by a number of museums. In 1998 he recreated a triptych by Simone Martini for the Barber Institute of Fine Arts.

He was one of a team on a TV show which recreated a Botticelli painting in a week. As well as traditional iconic subject matter of saints and madonnas, he has used the same techniques to depict rock heroes, including Elvis Presley, Jimi Hendrix and John Lennon. He formed a Broadstairs group of the Stuckists art movement in 2005 and has exhibited with the group on several occasions since, including I Won't Have Sex with You as long as We're Married, 2007, at the A Gallery, London.

In 2007, Murphy painted twelve "vibrant images" for a new shrine to St. Ethelbert, king and martyr, in Hereford Cathedral, where the saint is buried. The images, painted in his usual Byzantine technique, tell the story of the saint and are incorporated on a seven-sided wooden structure around a pillar to the east of the high altar. Robert Kilgour, cathedral architect, designed the structure, which was made by Stephen Florence. In 2013 Murphy founded the St Peter's Centre for Sacred Art in the Medieval Church of St Peter's in Canterbury England to teach traditional Byzantine and Early Italian painting techniques.

== See also ==
- Stuckism
- Tempera
