= Asim Butt =

Asim Butt may refer to:

- Asim Butt (cricketer)
- Asim Butt (artist)
