= Michael Dickinson =

Michael Dickinson may refer to:

- Michael Dickinson (artist) (1950-2020), English artist
- Michael Dickinson (biologist) (born 1963), American fly bioengineer
- Michael Dickinson (horseman) (born 1950), English racehorse trainer
