= A Gallery =

Contemporary art gallery in London

Coordinates: 51.4110°N 0.2094°W

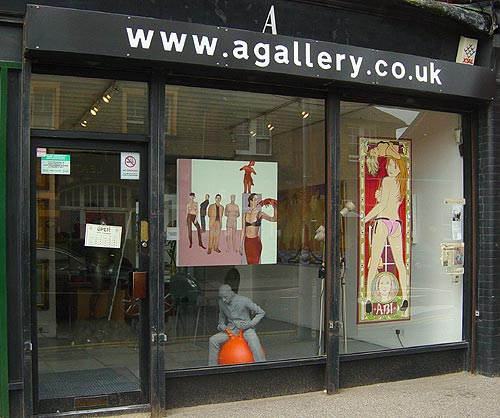
The A Gallery, Wimbledon, July 2007. Paintings by Peter McArdle (left) and Paul Harvey, sculpture by Adrian Bannister.

The A Gallery was a contemporary art gallery in Wimbledon, London run by Fraser Kee Scott.

== Founding ==
The A Gallery was founded by Fraser Kee Scott in 1997. The gallery's first exhibit was recent Chelsea graduate Alison Jackson's Crucifix, priced at £1,500 and five years later valued at ten times that amount, after she had won a Bafta and written a best-selling book.

== Exhibitions ==
=== Nude sculpture ===
In 2004, the gallery exhibited in the window a life-sized nude sculpture, This Is Me (Who Am I), by Marie White (aged 24), a graduate of Wimbledon College of Art. The work, made from hair, wax and resin, was shown at her degree show without a problem. A lady entered the gallery and expressed interest in the work. Then some local schoolboys entered and made out they were molesting the sculpture, until Scott shouted at them and they left. Some passers-by made complaints to police that the sculpture was "disgusting", one stopping a police car to do so. Two policeman went to the gallery, which was advised the work was offensive under the Indecent Displays Act 1991. Chief Inspector Neil Patterson, who visited the gallery, said the work was very lifelike, "very explicit and very graphic."

For 24 hours the sculpture was moved to the side of the gallery, out of public view, then returned to the window with two frosted glass panels in place. Scott raised the sculpture's price from £5,000 to £7,000, which he said was nearer its real value, as it had taken eight months and cost £3,000 to make, mainly for 250 hours of the model's time. White said the work was not intended to cause offence, and that, as it was not posed in a "lewd, crude way", she was surprised at "the reaction of males that they can't view a nude sculpture and not imprint the sexual aspect onto her." Scott said he knew that "eye-catching" sculptures in the gallery window, including a large screaming lady, would "get attention, but I didn't know it would get this," that there were nude sculptures outside the Houses of Parliament, including male figures, and he did not understand why there was so much fuss. The sculpture was later exhibited as part of the town's Feva festival in The Boathouse at Waterside, Knaresborough, White's home town.

=== Stuckists ===
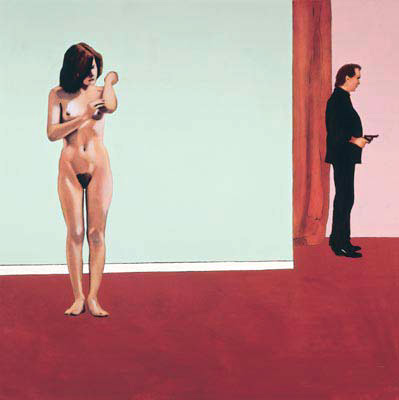
Peter McArdle. An Annunciation. Censored by MySpace.

In October 2005, Scott, described as "gallery owner—and Stuckist", said in The Daily Telegraph that Tate gallery chairman, Paul Myners, was hypocritical for refusing to divulge the price paid by the Tate for its purchase of The Upper Room, paintings by its trustee, Chris Ofili, who had asked other artists to donate work to the gallery. Scott said that Stuckist artists would be painting pictures called "The Hypocrisy of Myners" and the best one would be offered to the Tate.

The gallery staged On Form, a group show which included Paul Normansell, Diarmuid Byron O'Connor and Stuckist artists, Charles Thomson, Paul Harvey and Peter McArdle, whose painting On a Theme of Annunciation, used to promote the show, was censored by MySpace for showing a nude figure. Scott said it had been removed without warning, called the site "Murdoch Space" and said the painting was not porn or titillation, but thought-provoking: "They don't seem to be able to differentiate between the two!"

In an article in the South London Guardian, Scott talked about the show and also about Scientology. Six weeks later in the Evening Standard, Thomson said the South London Guardian article put the Stuckists in a difficult position, as he had been promised the gallery was run as a commercial enterprise, and it was "outrageous" that the show should be used to promote Scientology, linking it to the Stuckists, who had no connection with the Church. The article had included a painting by Paul Harvey, who said, "I feel my work was being used without my permission to promote Scientology." Leading German Stuckist Peter Klint said it was "very dangerous" to co-operate with the gallery and that it would fund Scientology. Scott said that it wasn't "even an issue" and he did not use artists to promote Scientology, but was dedicated to selling their work, which he did so very successfully.

Interviewed later by Scott, Thomson said that his remarks in the Evening Standard represented how he saw matters at the time, but that he accepted Scott's subsequent explanation that there was no intention to link the show and the Church and Scott did not realise the article would do this; Thomson said to Scott that the matter was a misunderstanding which had been resolved, and the Stuckists had continued to show successfully at the gallery: "For the record, I have always found you to be a very honest and principled person with a genuine passion for art."

In July 2007, the Stuckists held an exhibition at the gallery, I Won't Have Sex with You as long as We're Married. The Stuckist show was titled after words apparently said to Thomson by his ex-wife, Stella Vine on their wedding night. It coincided with the opening of Vine's major show at Modern Art Oxford and was occasioned by Thomson's anger that the material promoting her show omitted any mention of her time with the Stuckists, which he said had had an influence on galvanising her previously "fairly ordinary" work.

Work in the show included a painting by Harvey based on Vine and Thomson's wedding photo, and two paintings by Mark D of Vine, who holds a placard in one with the words "Go fuck yourself", which Vine had previously said to him, when he attempted to buy her work and she found out he had a link with Thomson. Another painting by Mark D, the Hypocrisy of Myners, depicted Tate gallery chairman, Paul Myners. The show also exhibited Michael Dickinson's collage, Good Boy, for which Dickinson faced prosecution in Turkey on a charge of insulting the Turkish prime minister. Leo Goatley, Rose West's solicitor, showed New Millennium Economic Symphony, a painting commenting on the undermining of "society's dwindling safety" as a result of government reforms.

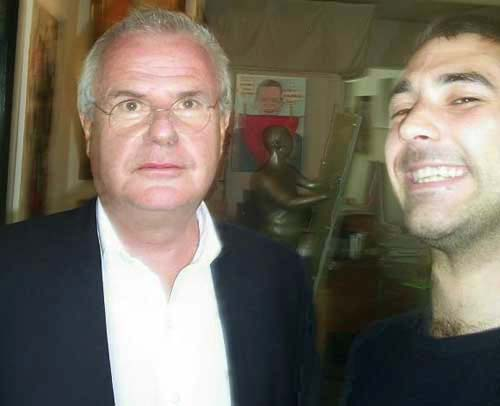
Then-Tate gallery chairman Paul Myners (left) and Fraser Kee Scott, director of A Gallery, in July 2007.

Myners visited both Vine's and the Stuckists' shows in succession. Scott said, "He [Myners] said he wasn't sure why we were so critical when our art was quite similar to the stuff... at the Tate"; Scott replied, "...if that were the case why on earth did the Tate turn down the art we offered them?"

In May 2008, Jason James, head of the British Council in Tokyo, ordered a print from the gallery of Sir Nicholas Serota Makes an Acquisitions Decision, Thomson's "infamous" painting of Tate gallery director, Sir Nicholas Serota, with a view to unveiling it during Serota's forthcoming visit. A printing delay prevented this.

=== Go Figure ===
In June 2008, the gallery opened Go Figure, a figurative exhibition by nine artists including Diarmuid Byron O'Connor, Beth Carter, Mila Judge Furstova, Gay Ribisi, Dormice, Carmen Giraldez, Charles Thomson, Thomas Ostenberg and Paul Normansell.

An article on Go Figure in GQ magazine showed Normansell's painting of Kate Moss, which was seen by the manager of rock band The Killers, who commissioned Normansell to create the artwork for the Day & Age album and the single, Human. The video to the single the Killers featured Normansell's paintings.

=== Scientology connections ===
In 2001, Scott became a member of the Church of Scientology during a trip to Los Angeles. The gallery had a shelf of books for sale by Scientology founder, L. Ron Hubbard and hosted religious workshops for the Church about two times a week. Scott said that the importance of artists is acknowledged by Scientology, whose teachings can help artists' work by improving their "emotional tone", which in the case of Francis Bacon was "all fear".

Scott has worked with photographer Tyler Shields, who has said of A Gallery's Scientology affiliation, "I have a lot of friends that are Scientologists ... Fraser [Kee Scott], the guy who runs that gallery, he found me back in the MySpace days. He is a very, very fucking smart guy and he has a great eye for things. He worked at my last gallery and to my knowledge he wasn't promoting Scientology to anybody, he was trying to sell art."

The A Gallery was located at 154 Merton Hall Road, Wimbledon, London SW19 3PZ.
