= Eamon Everall =

English Stuckist artist and educator

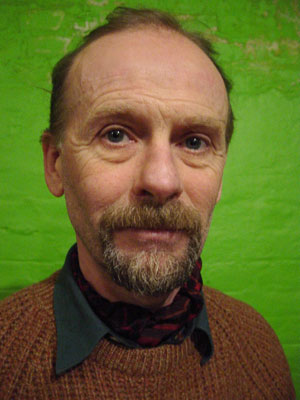
- Eamon Everall
- Born: 6 October 1948 (age 77); Aldershot, Hampshire, England
- Education: Waltham Forest School of Art, Wimbledon School of Art, Architectural Association School of Architecture
- Known for: Painting
- Notable work: The Marriage, The Gift
- Movement: Stuckism

Eamon Everall (born 6 October 1948) is an English artist and educator. He was one of the 12 founder members of the Stuckists art group. He paints in a "neo-cubist" style, with subjects from life worked on over a long period.

== Life and career ==
He was born in Aldershot, Hampshire in an army family. He spent his childhood years in the UK, Europe and Asia, and attended 14 schools, including in Germany and the Far East. The last of these were St Edmunds School, Dover, and The Harvey Grammar School, Folkestone, both in Kent, England.

He studied art at the now-defunct Folkestone School of Art, and then Waltham Forest School of Art (now University of East London). He took a postgraduate course in advanced printmaking at Wimbledon School of Art, specialising in printmaking. After college he travelled abroad, and ended up working on a Rhine river steamer, then worked as a postman and a dustman.

1974–76, Everall won an ARCUK (Architects' Registration Council of the United Kingdom) scholarship and studied architecture at the Architectural Association School of Architecture, London. For the following twelve years he repaired musical instruments, was a builder's assistant labourer, antique fair promoter and part-time art lecturer.

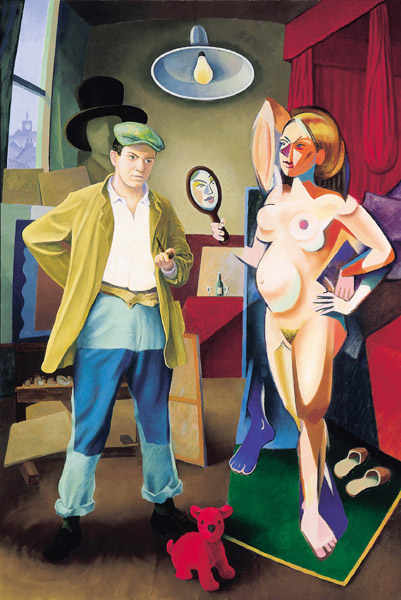
Eamon Everall. The Marriage

From 1988 onwards, he has divided his week between his studio practice and working as Head of Art & Design, Redbridge Institute, London. He said that "adult learners really can turn out the goods and produce work of great depth and wit" and that he sees entry level students regularly gaining university places.

In 1996, he gained a post-graduate degree (MA) in Visual Theory. He was a founder member of the Stuckist art movement in 1999, and has been an exhibitor in all their main group shows since then. In 2000 he curated the Stuckist exhibition at the Metropole Arts Centre in Folkestone.

In 2004, he was one of the fourteen "founder and featured" artists in The Stuckists Punk Victorian held at the Walker Art Gallery for the Liverpool Biennial. In 2006, he was one of the ten "leading Stuckists" in the Go West exhibition at Spectrum London gallery.

He lives in east London on the edge of Epping Forest. He practices Buddhist meditation; his early years in Malaya have created a lasting taste for hot, spicy food.

== Art ==
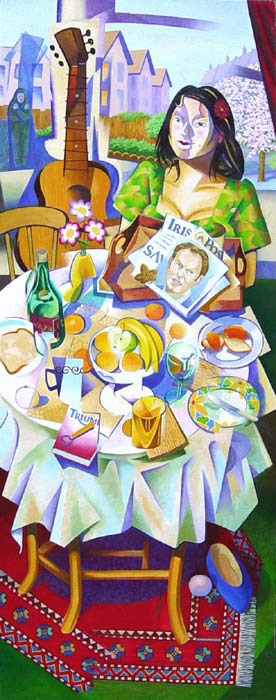
Eamon Everall. The Gift

Everall creates vivid compositions incorporating elements of neo-cubism. He mostly works from life and observation, although there is considerable interpretation in the result.

Some of his paintings may take several years to complete, as changes are made and the composition revised over many layers. He is also technically knowledgeable, studying theories of "paint chemistry, technique, history of art, composition and the perceptual process. I consider such knowledge an essential part of the painter's method."

He goes on Buddhist meditation retreats, and this can inform his work: the idea for a painting The Gift came to him "in a flash" during one. He refrains from talking about the meaning of the painting, as it "works on a number of different levels. I'm trying to create paintings which can be revisited time and time again, so the viewer finds a growing set of meanings and sensations."

The basic subject of the painting is a woman standing behind a cluttered table of plates, fruit and books, and seen through a doorway (the painting is the shape and size of a door). There is an empty chair next to her and a guitar in between.

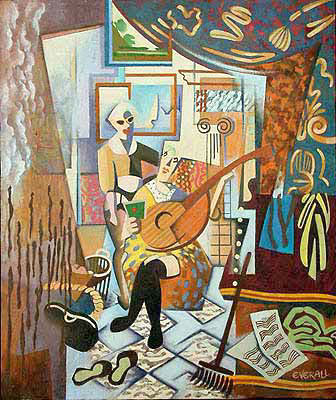
Eamon Everall. The Love Letter

Behind her is what appears to be a window showing a typical English residential street. The woman's hands hold a wooden tray upon which lie an assortment of papers and magazines. Different viewpoints, visual perspectives and facetted images are employed throughout the painting which is built upon a vertical pictorial geometry based on a golden section rectangle and a square.

As of 2008, Everall is working on a series of paintings portraying artists associated with Stuckism. Completed so far are portraits of Billy Childish and Charles Thomson (co-founders of Stuckism), Ella Guru and Mark D, plus one of himself. All the portraits are either wholly from life or using drawings made from life, backed up with his own photos. The intention is to create more than 20 such works in the coming year.

As well as producing paintings and related 2D art work, Everall also creates 3D works which range from small palm sized ceramic pieces to large outdoor stone sculpture. He won a commission for a Millennium sculpture in East London.

== Gallery ==
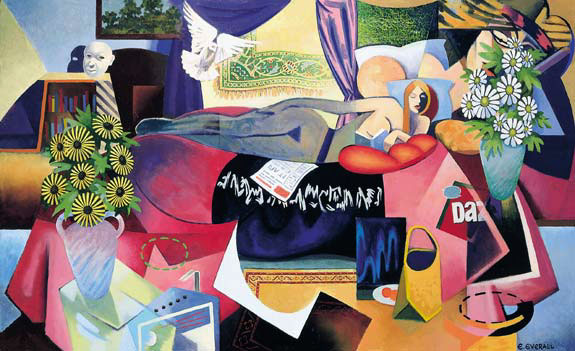
A Newer Olympia

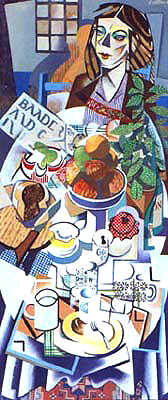
Windmill Baader

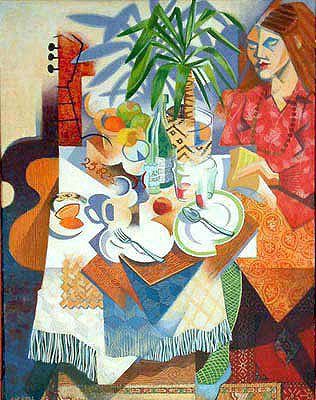
Breakfast with Andrea

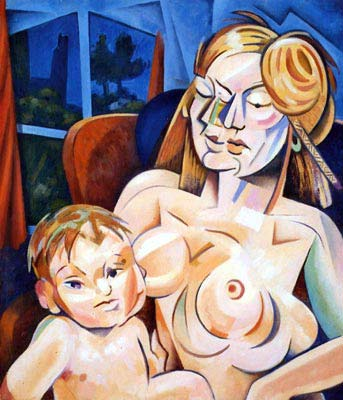
Mother and Child

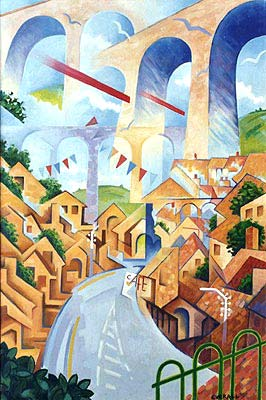
Folkestone 1

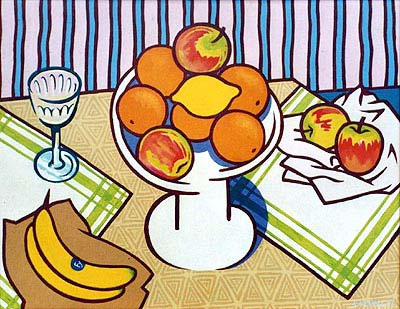
Candy Stripes

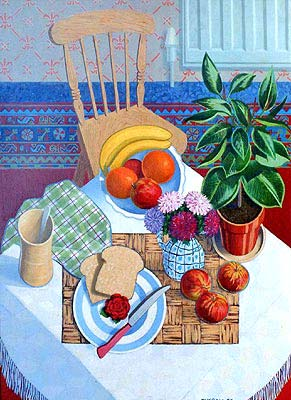
Axonometric Still Life

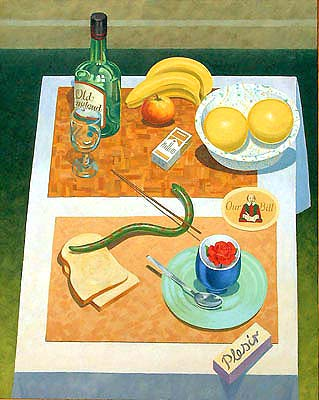
Desire

== Notes and references ==
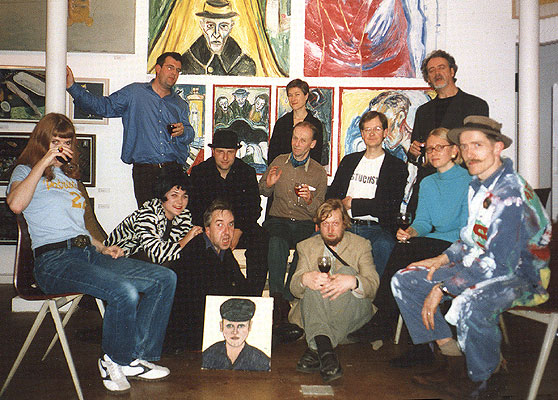
Eamon Everall (seated, centre) with the first Stuckist group, 2000
