= Peter Klint =

German painter

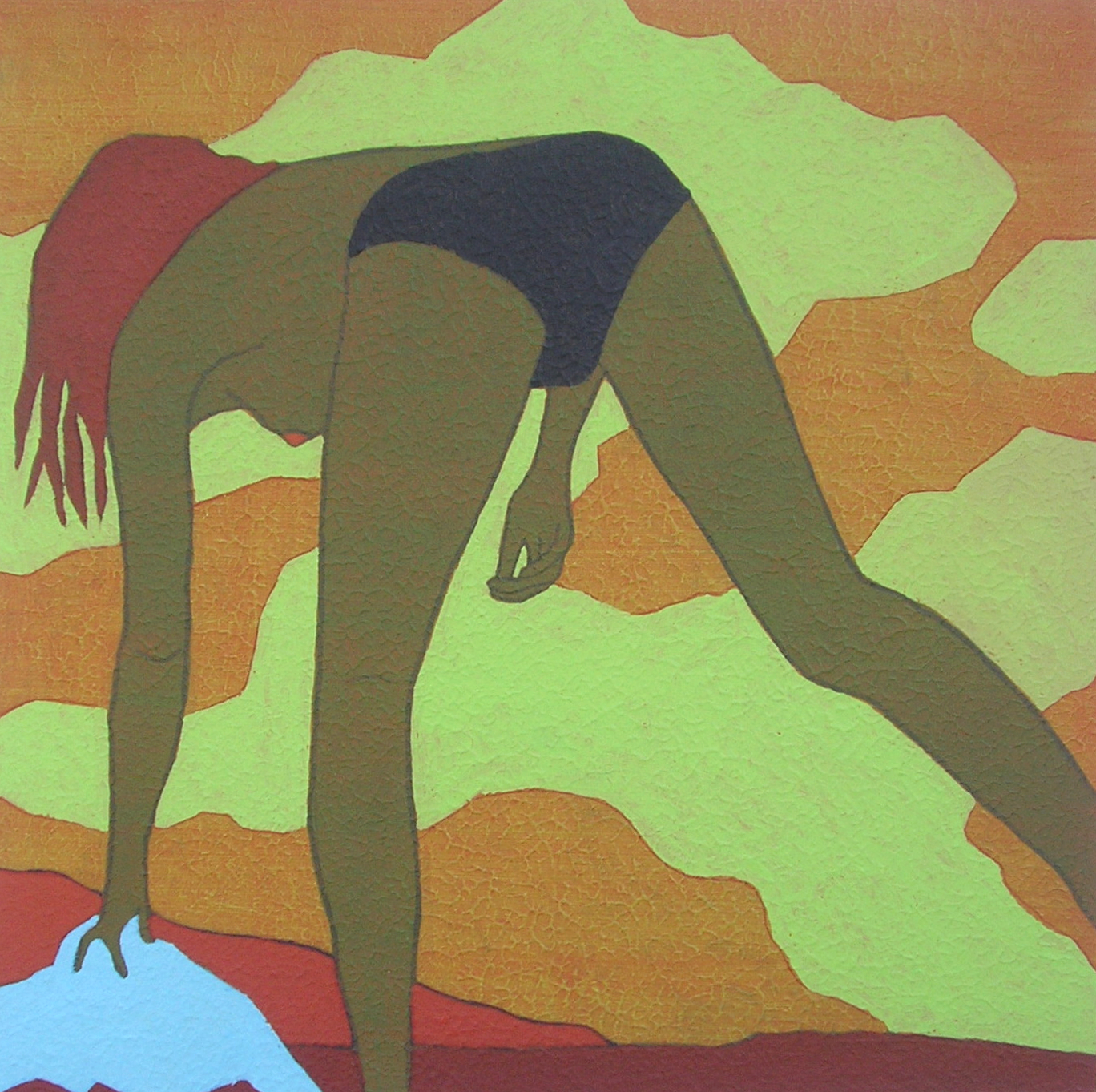
Peter Klint. Rotes Kliff, Kiel, 2008

Peter Klint (born 11 November 1971) is a German artist. He is a figurative painter and was a member of the Stuckist movement from 2003 to 2007.

In October 2001 Klint's Portrait of Thomas Bernhard was on the front page of TLS magazine.

Klint's work was part of the international Stuckist group shows "War on Bush" (Yale University, New Haven 2003, curated by Jesse Richards) and "Triumph of Stuckism" (Liverpool John Moores University, School of Art and Design 2006, curated by Naive John) . In 2006 Klint curated the Stuckist group show "Stuckomenta I" in Hamburg.

In 2010 Klint's Work was published in "1999-2009 - The Stuckist Decade" (Victoria Press, London) by Robert Janás .
