= Stuckism =

International art movement

- Formation: 28 January 1999; 27 years ago
- Location: Worldwide
- Members: 233 groups
- Founders: Billy Childish; Charles Thomson
- Members of first group: Philip Absolon, Eamon Everall, Ella Guru, Bill Lewis, Joe Machine, Charles Williams, Wolf Howard, Sexton Ming, Frances Castle, Sheila Clarke, Sanchia Lewis
- Later members: Elsa Dax, Guy Denning, Michael Dickinson, Robert Janás, Odysseus Yakoumakis, John Bourne, Mark D, Paul Harvey, Stephen Howarth, Alexis Hunter, Abby Jackson, Naive John, Rachel Jordan, Jane Kelly, Peter McArdle, Mandy McCartin, Peter Murphy, Rémy Noë, Udaiyan, Jeffrey Scott Holland, Frank Kozik, Terry Marks, Nicholas Watson, Godfrey Blow, Asim Butt, Mike Mayhew, Regan Tamanui, Jonathon Coudrille
- Website: stuckism.com

Stuckism (/ˈstʌkɪzəm/) is an international art movement founded in 1999 by Billy Childish and Charles Thomson to promote figurative painting as opposed to conceptual art. By May 2017, the initial group of 13 British artists had expanded to 236 groups in 52 countries.

Childish and Thomson have issued several manifestos. The first one was The Stuckists, consisting of 20 points starting with "Stuckism is a quest for authenticity". Remodernism, the other well-known manifesto of the movement, opposes the deconstruction and irony of postmodernism in favor of what Stuckists refer to as the "spirituality" of the artist. In another manifesto they define themselves as anti-anti-art which is against anti-art and for what they consider conventional art.

After exhibiting in small galleries in Shoreditch, London, the Stuckists' first show in a major public museum was held in 2004 at the Walker Art Gallery, as part of the Liverpool Biennial. The group has demonstrated annually at Tate Britain against the Turner Prize since 2000, sometimes dressed in clown costumes. They have also come out in opposition to the Charles Saatchi-patronised Young British Artists.

Although painting is the dominant artistic form of Stuckism, artists using other media such as photography, sculpture, film and collage have also joined, and share the Stuckist opposition to conceptualism and "ego-art."

== Name, founding and origin ==
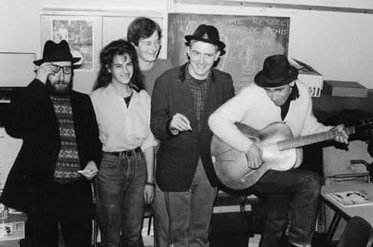
Sexton Ming, Tracey Emin, Charles Thomson, Billy Childish and musician Russell Wilkinson at the Rochester Adult Education Centre to record the Medway Poets LP, 11 December 1987.

The name "Stuckism" was coined in January 1999 by Charles Thomson in response to a poem read to him several times by Billy Childish. In it, Childish recites that his former girlfriend, Tracey Emin had said he was "stuck! stuck! stuck!" with his art, poetry and music. Later that month, Thomson approached Childish with a view to co-founding an art group called Stuckism, which Childish agreed to, on the basis that Thomson would do the work for the group, as Childish already had a full schedule.

There were eleven other founding members: Philip Absolon, Frances Castle, Sheila Clark, Eamon Everall, Ella Guru, Wolf Howard, Bill Lewis, Sanchia Lewis, Joe Machine, Sexton Ming, and Charles Williams. The membership has evolved since its founding through creative collaborations: the group was originally promoted as working in paint, but members have since worked in various other media, including poetry, fiction, performance, photography, film and music.

In 1979, Thomson, Childish, Bill Lewis and Ming were members of the Medway Poets performance group, to which Absolon and Sanchia Lewis had earlier contributed. Peter Waite's Rochester Pottery staged a series of solo painting shows. In 1982, TVS broadcast a documentary on the poets. That year, Emin, then a fashion student, and Childish started a relationship; her writing was edited by Bill Lewis, printed by Thomson and published by Childish. Group members published dozens of works. The poetry group dispersed after two years, reconvening in 1987 to record The Medway Poets LP. Clark, Howard and Machine became involved over the following years. Thomson got to know Williams, who was a local art student and whose girlfriend was a friend of Emin; Thomson also met Everall. During the foundation of the group, Ming brought in his girlfriend, Guru, who in turn invited Castle.

== Manifestos ==
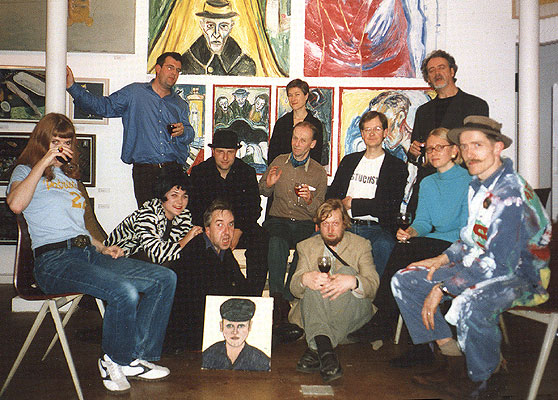
The first Stuckists group of 13 artists at the Real Turner Prize Show, Pure Gallery, Shoreditch, London, in October 2000

In August 1999, Childish and Thomson wrote The Stuckists manifesto which stress the value of painting as a medium, its use for communication, and the expression of emotion and experience – as opposed to what Stuckists see as the superficial novelty, nihilism and irony of conceptual art and postmodernism. The most contentious statement in the manifesto is: "Artists who don't paint aren't artists".

The second and third manifestos, An Open Letter to Sir Nicholas Serota and Remodernism respectively, were sent to the director of the Tate, Nicholas Serota. He sent a brief reply: "Thank you for your open letter dated 6 March. You will not be surprised to learn that I have no comment to make on your letter, or your manifesto 'Remodernism'."

In the Remodernism manifesto, the Stuckists declared that they aimed to replace postmodernism with remodernism, a period of renewed spiritual (as opposed to religious) values in art, culture and society. Other manifestos have included Handy Hints, Anti-anti-art, The Cappuccino writer and the Idiocy of Contemporary Writing, The Turner Prize, The Decreptitude of the Critic and Stuckist critique of Damien Hirst.

In Anti-anti-art, the Stuckists outlined their opposition to what is known as "anti-art". Stuckists claim that conceptual art is justified by the work of Marcel Duchamp, but that Duchamp's work is "anti-art by intent and effect". The Stuckists feel that "Duchamp's work was a protest against the stale, unthinking artistic establishment of his day", while "the great (but wholly unintentional) irony of postmodernism is that it is a direct equivalent of the conformist, unoriginal establishment that Duchamp attacked in the first place".

Manifestos have been written by other Stuckists, including the Students for Stuckism group. An "Underage Stuckists" group was founded in 2006 with a manifesto for teenagers written by two 16-year-olds, Liv Soul and Rebekah Maybury, on MySpace. In 2009, a group calling itself the Other Muswell Hill Stuckists published The Founding, Manifesto and Rules of the Other Muswell Hill Stuckists.

== Growth in the UK ==
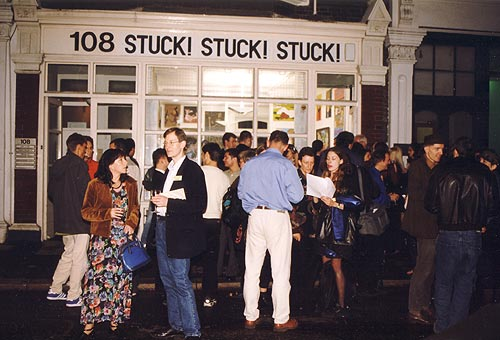
Stuck! Stuck! Stuck!, the first Stuckist show, 1999

In July 1999, the Stuckists were first mentioned in the media, in an article in The Evening Standard and soon gained other coverage, helped by press interest in Tracey Emin, who had been nominated for the Turner Prize.

The first Stuckist show was Stuck! Stuck! Stuck! in September 1999 in Joe Crompton's in Shoreditch Gallery 108 (now defunct), followed by The Resignation of Sir Nicholas Serota. In 2000, they staged The Real Turner Prize Show at the same time as the Tate Gallery's Turner Prize exhibition.

A "Students for Stuckism" group was founded in 2000 by students from Camberwell College of Arts, who staged their own exhibition. S.P. Howarth was expelled from the painting degree course at Camberwell college for his paintings, and had the first solo exhibit at the Stuckism International Gallery in 2002, named I Don't Want a Painting Degree if it Means Not Painting.

Thomson stood as a Stuckist candidate for the 2001 British General Election, in the constituency of Islington South & Finsbury, against Chris Smith, the then Secretary of State for Culture. He picked up 108 votes (0.4%). Childish left the group at this time because he objected to Thomson's leadership.

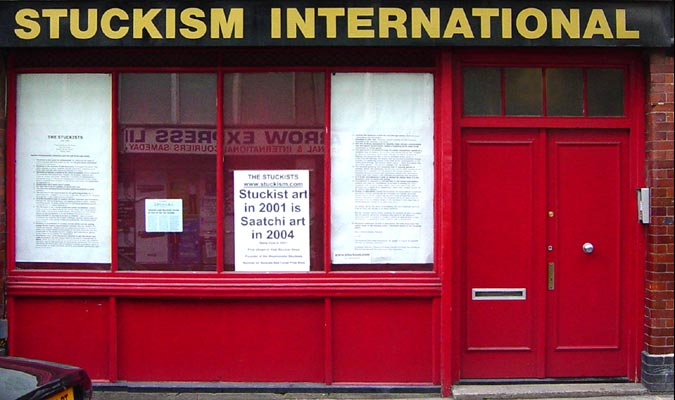
Stuckism International Gallery

From 2002 to 2005, Thomson ran the Stuckism International Centre and Gallery in Shoreditch, London. In 2003, under the title A Dead Shark Isn't Art, the gallery exhibited a shark which had first been put on public display in 1989 (two years before Damien Hirst's) by Eddie Saunders in his Shoreditch shop, JD Electrical Supplies. It was suggested that Hirst may have seen this and copied it.

In 2003, they reported Charles Saatchi to the UK Office of Fair Trading, complaining that he had an effective monopoly on art. The complaint was not upheld. In 2003, an allied group, Stuckism Photography, was founded by Larry Dunstan and Andy Bullock. In 2005, the Stuckists offered a donation of 175 paintings from the Walker show to the Tate; however, it was rejected by the Tate's trustees.

In August 2005, Thomson alerted the press to the fact that the Tate had purchased a work by Chris Ofili, The Upper Room, for £705,000 while the artist was a serving Tate trustee. Fraser Kee Scott, owner of A Gallery, demonstrated with the Stuckists outside the Tate Gallery against the gallery's purchase of The Upper Room. Scott said in The Daily Telegraph that the Tate Gallery's chairman, Paul Myners, was hypocritical for refusing to divulge the price paid. Ofili had asked other artists to donate work to the gallery. In July 2006 the Charity Commission censured the gallery for acting outside its legal powers. Sir Nicholas Serota stated that the Stuckists had "acted in the public interest".

In October 2006, the Stuckists staged their first exhibition, Go West, in a commercial West End gallery, Spectrum London; this signalled their entry as "major players" in the art world.

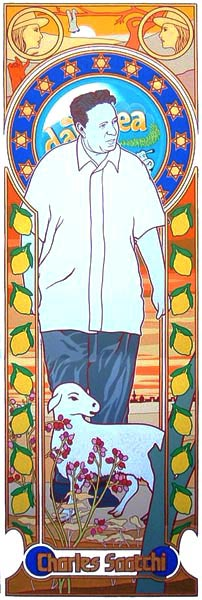
Paul Harvey. Charles Saatchi, 2006.

An international symposium on Stuckism took place in October 2006 at the Liverpool John Moores University during the Liverpool Biennial. The programme was led by Naive John, founder of the Liverpool Stuckists. There was an accompanying exhibition in the 68 Hope Gallery at Liverpool School of Art and Design (John Moores University Gallery).

By 2006, there were 63 Stuckist groups in the UK. Members include Naive John, Mark D, Elsa Dax, Paul Harvey, Jane Kelly, Udaiyan, Peter McArdle, Peter Murphy, Rachel Jordan, Guy Denning and Abby Jackson. John Bourne opened Stuckism Wales at his home, a permanent exhibition of (mainly Welsh) paintings. Mandy McCartin is a regular guest artist.

In 2010, Paul Harvey's painting of Charles Saatchi was banned from the window display of the Artspace Gallery in Maddox Street, London, on the grounds that it was "too controversial for the area". It was the centrepiece of the show, Stuckist Clowns Doing Their Dirty Work, the first exhibition of the Stuckists in Mayfair, and depicted Saatchi with a sheep at his feet and a halo made from a cheese wrapper. The Saatchi Gallery said that Saatchi "would not have any problem" with the painting's display. The gallery announced they were shutting down the show. Harvey said, "I did it to make Saatchi look friendly and human. It's a ludicrous decision". The Stuckists protested with emails to the gallery. Subsequently, the painting was reinstated and the show continued.

=== Demonstrations ===
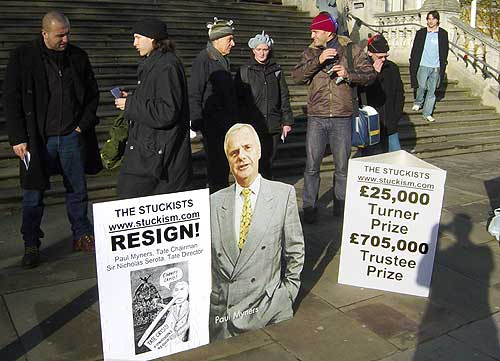
Outside the Turner Prize, Tate Britain, 2005: Stuckists demonstrate against the purchase of Chris Ofili's The Upper Room. The cutout is Tate chairman Paul Myners.

The Stuckists gained significant media coverage for eight years of protests (2000–2006 and 2008) outside Tate Britain against the Turner Prize, sometimes dressed as clowns. In 2001, they demonstrated in Trafalgar Square at the unveiling of Rachel Whiteread's Monument. In 2002, they carried a coffin marked The Death of Conceptual Art to the White Cube Gallery. Outside the launch of The Triumph of Painting at the Saatchi Gallery in 2004, they wore tall hats with Charles Saatchi's face emblazoned; they also carried placards claiming that Saatchi had copied their ideas.

Events outside Britain have included The Clown Trial of President Bush held in New Haven in 2003 to protest against the Iraq War. Michael Dickinson has exhibited political and satirical collages in Turkey for which he was arrested, and charged, but acquitted of any crime—an outcome which was seen to have positive implications for Turkey's relationship with the European Union.

=== The Stuckists Punk Victorian ===
The Stuckists Punk Victorian was the first national gallery exhibition of Stuckist art. It was held at the Walker Art Gallery and Lady Lever Art Gallery and was part of the 2004 Liverpool Biennial. It consisted of over 250 paintings by 37 artists, mostly from the UK but also with a representation of international Stuckist artists from the US, Germany and Australia. There was an accompanying exhibition of Stuckist photographers. A book, The Stuckists Punk Victorian, was published to accompany the exhibition. Daily Mail journalist Jane Kelly exhibited a painting of Myra Hindley in the show, which may have been the cause of her dismissal from her job.

=== A Gallery ===
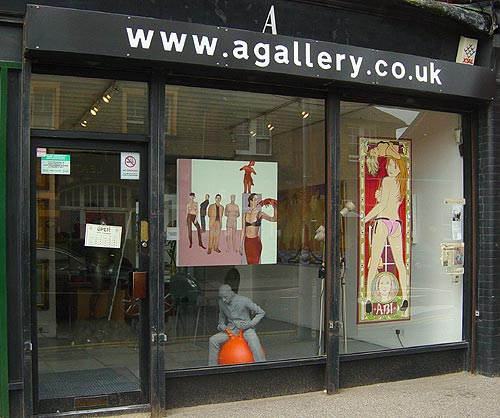
The A Gallery, Wimbledon, July 2007. Paintings by Peter McArdle (left) and Paul Harvey, sculpture by Adrian Bannister.

In July 2007, the Stuckists held an exhibition at A Gallery, I Won't Have Sex with You as long as We're Married, titled after words apparently said to Thomson by his ex-wife, Stella Vine on their wedding night. The show coincided with the opening of Vine's major show at Modern Art Oxford and was prompted by Thomson's anger that the material promoting her show did not mention her time with the Stuckists. Tate chairman Paul Myners visited both shows.

=== Sir Nicholas Serota Makes an Acquisitions Decision ===
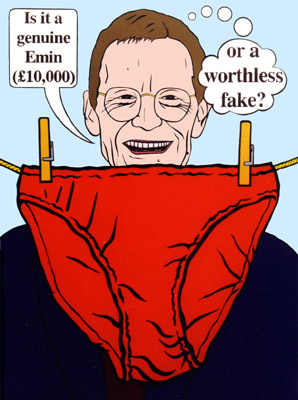
Charles Thomson. Sir Nicholas Serota Makes an Acquisitions Decision, 2000

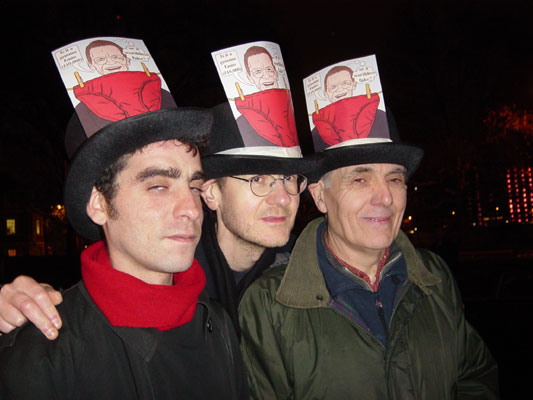
Demonstration against the Turner Prize, 2006. Left to right: Federico Penteado, Charles Thomson, John Bourne.

As Charlotte Cripps of The Independent wrote, Charles Thomson's painting Sir Nicholas Serota Makes an Acquisitions Decision is one of the best known paintings to come out of the Stuckist movement, and as Jane Morris wrote in The Guardian it's a likely "signature piece" for the movement, standing for its opposition to conceptual art. Painted in 2000, the piece has been exhibited in later Stuckist shows, and featured on placards in Stuckist demonstrations against the Turner Prize. It depicts Sir Nicholas Serota, Director of the Tate Gallery and the usual chairman of the Turner Prize jury, and satirises Young British Artist Tracey Emin's installation, My Bed, consisting of her bed and objects, including knickers, which she exhibited in 1999 as a Turner Prize nominee.

== International movement ==
In 2000, Regan Tamanui started the first Stuckist group outside Britain in Melbourne, Australia, and it was decided that other artists should be free to start their own groups also, named after their locality. Stuckism has since grown into an international art movement of 233 groups in 52 countries, as of July 2012.

=== Africa ===
Mafa Bamba founded the Abidgan Stuckists in 2001 in Ivory Coast and Kari Seid founded the Cape Town Stuckists in 2008 in South Africa.

=== America ===
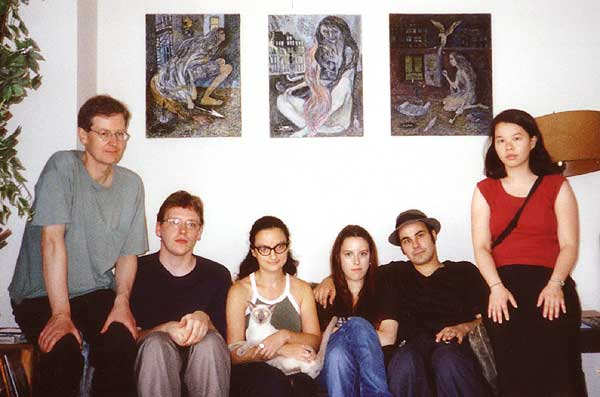
Charles Thomson with US Stuckists, Nicholas Watson, Terry Marks, Marisa Shepherd, Jesse Richards and Catherine Chow, 2001

In 2000, Susan Constanse founded the first U.S. group the Pittsburgh Stuckists in Pittsburgh—the second group to be founded outside the UK. This was announced in the In Pittsburgh Weekly, 1 November 2000: "The new word in art is Stuckism. A Stuckist paints their life, mind and soul with no pretensions and no excuses." By 2011, there were 44 U.S. Stuckist groups. There have been Stuckist shows and demonstrations in the U.S., and American Stuckists have also exhibited in international Stuckist shows abroad. U.S. Stuckists include Ron Throop, Jeffrey Scott Holland, Frank Kozik and Terry Marks. There are also 4 Stuckist groups in Canada including the White Rock Stuckists in British Columbia founded by David Wilson.

=== Asia ===
Asim Butt founded the first Pakistani Stuckist group, the Karachi Stuckists, in 2005. At the end of 2009 he was thinking of expanding the Karachi Stuckists with new members; however, on 15 January 2010 he committed suicide. In 2011, Sheherbano Husain restarted the group.

The Tehran Stuckists is an Iranian Stuckist, Remodernist and anti-anti-art group of painters founded in 2007 in Tehran, which is a major protagonist of Asian Stuckism. In April 2010 they curated the first Stuckist exhibition in Iran, Tehran Stuckists: Searching for the Unlimited Potentials of Figurative Painting, at Iran Artists Forum, Mirmiran Gallery. Their second exhibition, International Stuckists: Painters Out of Order, including paintings by Stuckists from Iran, Britain, USA, Spain, South Africa, Pakistan and Turkey was held at Day Gallery in November 2013. Although one of the main aspects of Stuckism movement is that "the Stuckist allows him/herself uncensored expression"; however, the Tehran Stuckists exhibitions in Iran are censored and they are not allowed to exhibit some of their artworks in Iranian galleries. The group has also participated in Stuckist exhibitions in Britain, Lithuania and Spain.

Other Asian Stuckists are Shelley Li (China), Smeetha Boumik (India), Joko Apridinoto (Indonesia), Elio Yuri Figini (Japan) and Fady Chamaa (Lebanon).

=== Europe ===
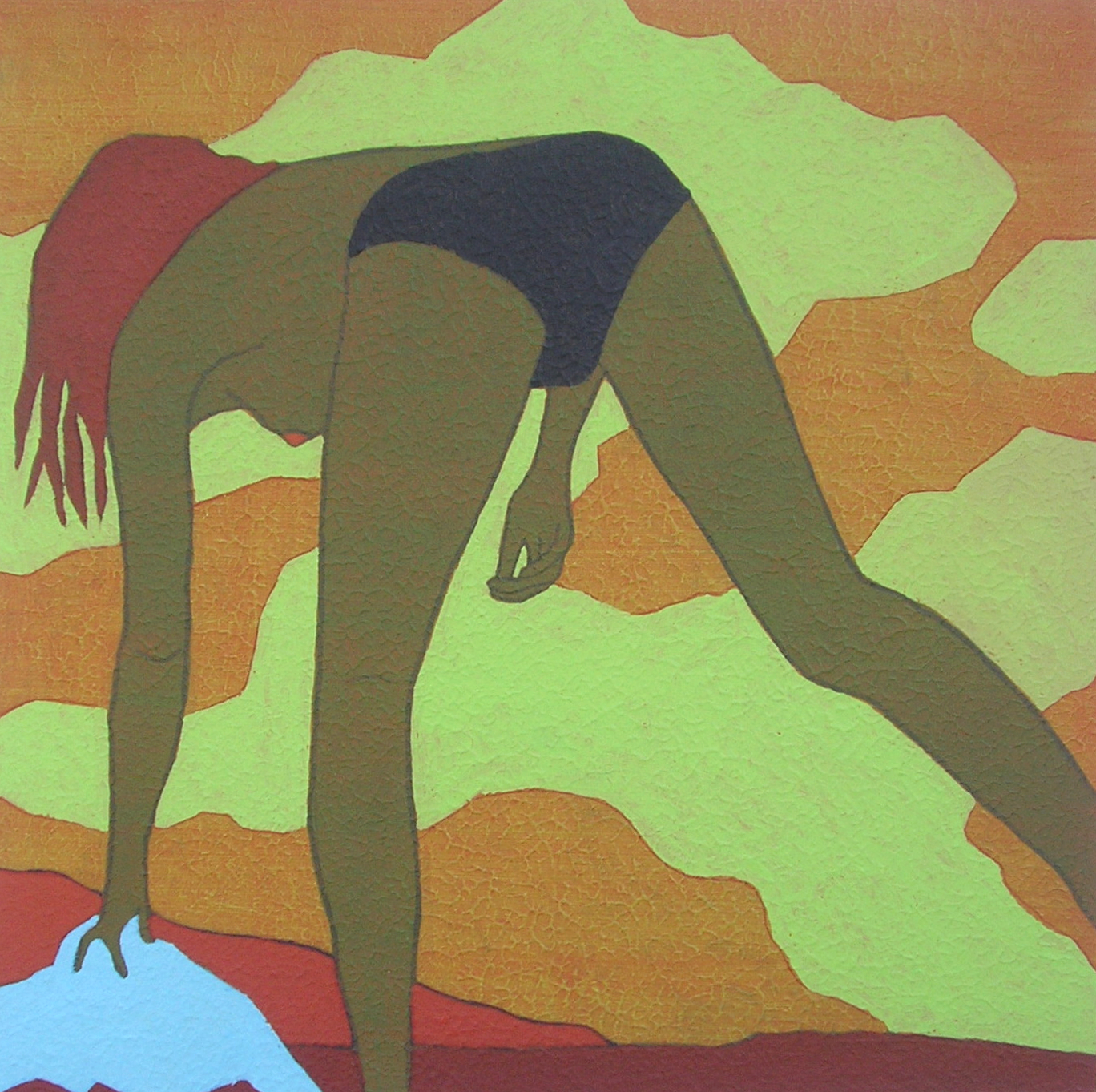
Peter Klint. Rotes Kliff, 2008

The Prague Stuckists were founded in 2005 in the Czech Republic by Robert Janás, Other Stuckist artists in Europe include Peter Klint (Germany), Michael Dickinson (Turkey), Odysseus Yakoumakis (Greece), Artista Eli (Spain), Kloot Per W (Belgium), Jaroslav Valečka (Czech Republic), Jiří Hauschka (Czech Republic), Markéta Korečková (Czech Republic), Ján Macko (Slovakia) and Pavel Lefterov (Bulgaria).

=== Oceania ===
In October 2000, Regan Tamanui founded the Melbourne Stuckists in Melbourne, the fourth Stuckist group to be started and the first one outside the UK. On 27 October 2000, he staged the Real Turner Prize Show at the Dead End Gallery in his home, concurrent with three shows with the same title in England (London, Falmouth and Dartington) and one in Germany in protest against the Tate Gallery's Turner Prize. Other Australian Stuckists include Godfrey Blow, who exhibited in The Stuckists Punk Victorian. In 2005 Mike Mayhew also founded the Christchurch Stuckists in New Zealand.

== Ex-Stuckists ==
Co-founder Billy Childish left the group in 2001, but has stated that he remains committed to its principles. Sexton Ming left to concentrate on a solo career with the Aquarium Gallery. Wolf Howard left in 2006, but has exhibited with the group since. Jesse Richards who ran the Stuckism Centre USA in New Haven, left the group in 2006 to focus on Remodernist film.

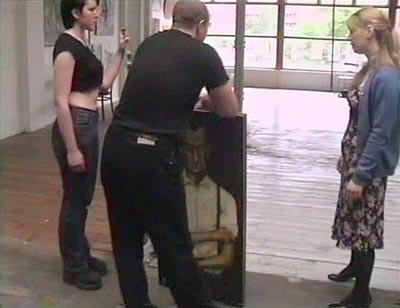
Stella Vine (right) with Charlotte Gavin (left) and Joe Machine at the Vote Stuckist show in 2001, where her work was first shown publicly.

In June 2000, Stella Vine went to a talk given by Childish and Thomson on Stuckism and Remodernism in London. At the end of May 2001, she exhibited some of her paintings publicly for the first time in the Vote Stuckist show in Brixton, and formed the Westminster Stuckists group. On 4 June, she took part in a Stuckist demonstration in Trafalgar Square. By 10 July, she had renamed her group the Unstuckists. In mid-August, Thomson and Vine married. A work by her was shown in the Stuckist show in Paris, which ended in mid-November, by which time she had rejected the Stuckists, and the marriage had ended.

In February 2004, Charles Saatchi bought a painting of Diana, Princess of Wales, by Vine and was credited with "discovering" her. Thomson said it was the Stuckists and not Saatchi who had discovered her. At the end of March 2004, Thomson made a formal complaint about Saatchi to the Office of Fair Trading, claiming that Saatchi's leading position was monopolistic "to the detriment of smaller competitors", citing Vine as an example of this. On 15 April, the OFT closed the file on the case on the basis that Saatchi was not "in a dominant position in any relevant market."

== Responses and critique ==
A short time after the 1999 exhibition of My Bed and the Stuckists' response with Sir Nicholas Serota Makes an Acquisitions Decision, a pair of performance artists named Yuan Cai and Jian Jun Xi performed an art intervention titled Two Naked Men Jump into Tracey's Bed at the Tate Gallery's Turner Prize. Cai had written, among other things, the words "Anti Stuckism" on his bare back as the two jumped on the bed and performed a pillow fight. Fiachra Gibbons of The Guardian wrote (in 1999) that the event "will go down in art history as the defining moment of the new and previously unheard of Anti-Stuckist Movement." Writing in The Guardian ten years later, Jonathan Jones described the Stuckists as "enemies of art", and what they say as "cheap slogans" and "hysterical rants".

The artist Max Podstolski wrote that the art world needed a new manifesto, as confrontational as that of Futurism or Dadaism, "written with a heart-felt passion capable of inspiring and rallying art world outsiders, dissenters, rebels, the neglected and disaffected", and suggests that "Well now we've got it, in the form of Stuckism".

New York art gallery owner Edward Winkleman wrote in 2006 that he had never heard of the Stuckists, so he "looked them up on Wikipedia", and stated he was "turned off by their anti-conceptual stance, not to mention the inanity of their statement about painting, but I'm more than a bit interested in the democratization their movement represents." Thomson responded to Winkleman directly.

Also in 2006, Colin Gleadell, writing in The Telegraph, noted that the Stuckists' first exhibition in central London had brought "multiple sales" for leading artists of the movement, and that this raised the question of how good they were at painting. He observed that "Whatever the critics may say, buyers from the UK, the US and Japan have already taken a punt. Six of Thomson's paintings have sold for between £4,000 and £5,000 each. Joe Machine, a former prisoner who paints for therapeutic reasons, has also sold six paintings for the same price."

Paul Vallely defended Sir Nicholas Serota from Stuckist campaigns, criticizing the movement's anti-conceptualism for its association with "forces of social reaction" such as the Daily Mail and upholding Serota as the "greatest single champion of modern art in Britain". Vallely stated that while "I did smile" at Acquisitions Decision, he equally admired Serota's "cool response to the Stuckist détournement", visiting the Punk Victorian show and conversing with members before rejecting an offered donation of their work as not of "sufficient quality in terms of accomplishment, innovation or originality of thought to warrant preservation in perpetuity in the national collection".

The BBC arts correspondent Lawrence Pollard wrote in 2009 that the way was paved for "cultural agitators" like the Stuckists, as well as the Vorticists, Surrealists and others, by the Futurist Manifesto of 20 February 1909.

== Gallery ==
Some UK Stuckist artists' work:

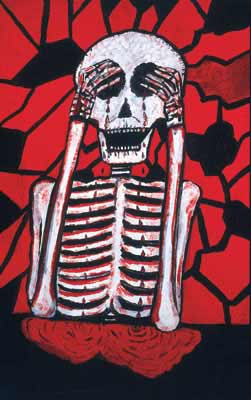
Philip Absolon. Breakdown (uploaded 2008, date of creation not known)

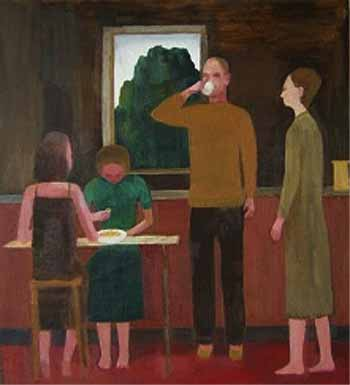
John Bourne. Epsom Kitchen (uploaded 2008)

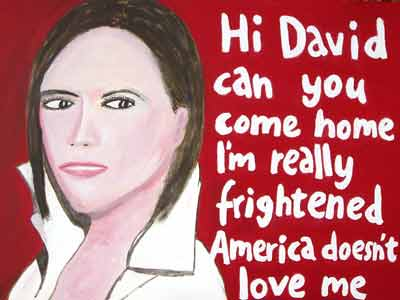
Mark D. Victoria Beckham: America Doesn't Love Me (uploaded 2008)

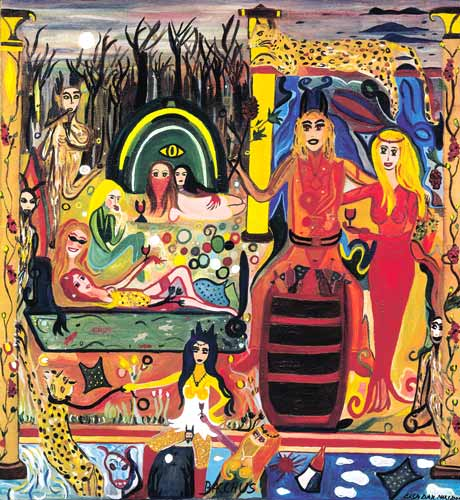
Elsa Dax. Bacchus (uploaded 2008)

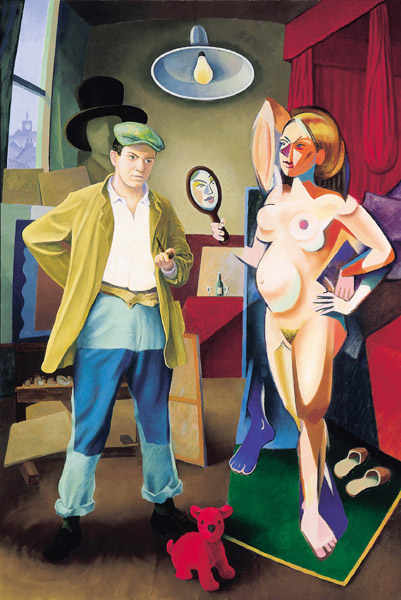
Eamon Everall. The Marriage (uploaded 2008)

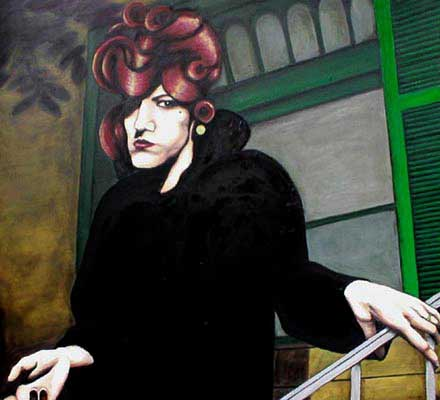
Ella Guru. Goodbye Columbus, (uploaded 2008)

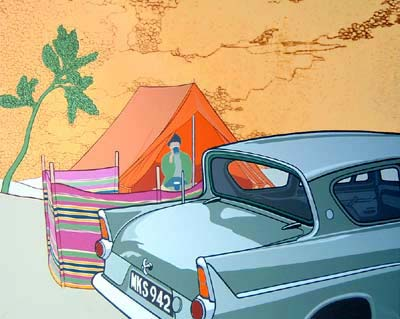
Paul Harvey. Ford Anglia with Tent and Giotto Tree (uploaded 2008)

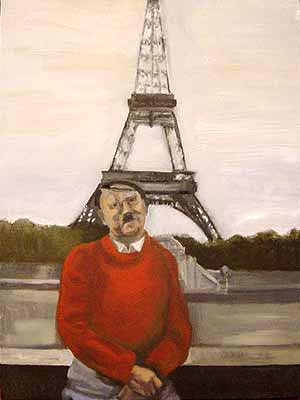
Jane Kelly. If We Could Undo Psychosis 1 (uploaded 2008)

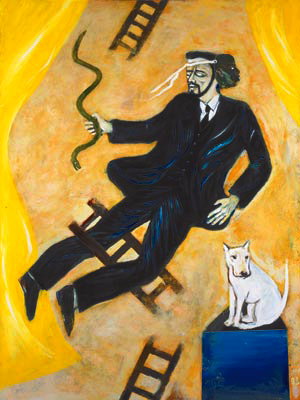
Bill Lewis. The Laughter of Small White Dogs (uploaded 2008)

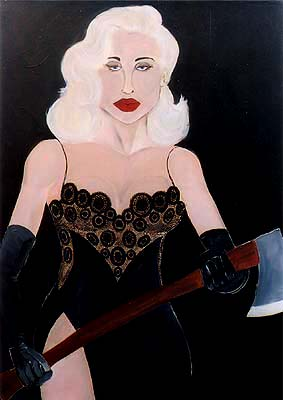
Joe Machine. Diana Dors with an Axe (uploaded 2008)

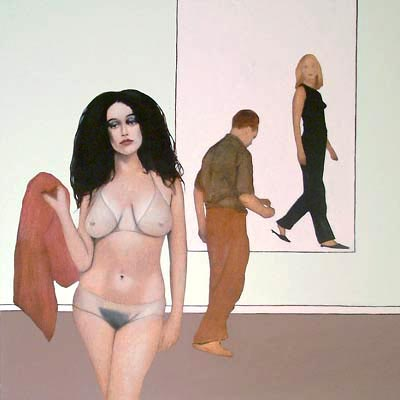
Peter McArdle. Artist and Model (uploaded 2008)

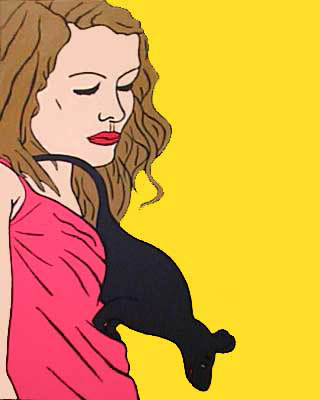
Charles Thomson. A Single Woman in London Is Never more than Six Inches from the Nearest Rat (uploaded 2008)

== See also ==
- List of Stuckist artists
- List of Stuckist shows
- Remodernism – Present-day modernist philosophical movement
- Dogme 95 – Danish filmmaking movement
- Neomodernism – Philosophical movement
- New Puritans – Literary movement
- Wesley Kimler – American painter (anti-conceptual artist)
