= Elsa Dax =

French painter

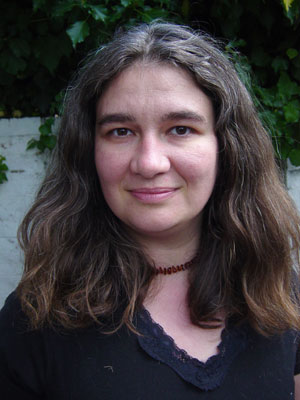
- Born: 14 May 1972 (age 54); Paris, France
- Education: Sorbonne
- Known for: Painting
- Notable work: Venus and Mars
- Movement: Stuckism

Elsa Dax (born 14 May 1972) is a French painter and a member of the Stuckists art movement. Major themes in her work are myth, legend and fairytale.

== Life and career ==
Elsa Dax was born in Paris, and educated at the Sorbonne where she gained an MA in cinema, Russian art studies, Constructivism and Suprematism. In 1994, she worked as a production assistant for the film Beyond the Clouds, directed by Michelangelo Antonioni. In 1995 she was a librarian in the Pompidou Centre. In 1996 she was a television production assistant at the Musée d'Orsay for the film Whistler, an American in Paris, directed by Edwige Kertes.

In 1997, she was a production cinema assistant at the Ciné Lumière, French Institute, South Kensington, London, and the following year a television encoder and editor for Xtreme Information Ltd. From 1997 to 1998, she rented a 3 sq metre room in a convent, containing just a bed, a small cupboard and a tap. She spent her time there painting, "and I was very happy". In 1999, she worked as an editor at the Cannes Advertisement Festival.

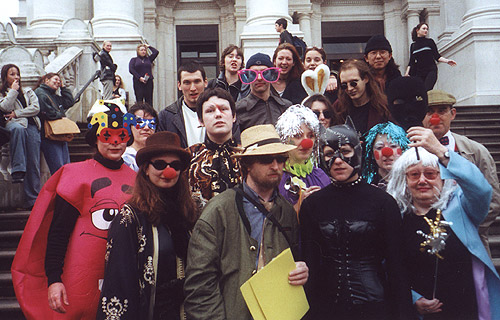
Elsa Dax (foreground, second from left) at the first Stuckist demonstration against the Turner Prize outside Tate Britain in 2000

In 2000, she joined the Stuckists, the anti-conceptual art movement co-founded by Billy Childish and Charles Thomson. She first exhibited with them in their The Real Turner Prize Show at the Pure Gallery, Shoreditch, London, in that year, and participated in their first demonstration outside Tate Britain against the Turner Prize. She also took part in other demonstrations in subsequent years, and has participated in may international Stuckist shows.

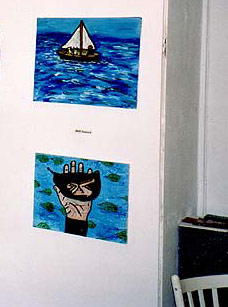
The First Stuckist Show in Paris curated by Elsa Dax. Work by Wolf Howard.

In 2001 she founded the Paris Stuckists and organised the Stuckist Vernissage (Stuckist Paintings) the first Paris show of the Stuckists at the Musee d'Adzak: this included the artist Stella Vine (later made famous by Charles Saatchi), who at that time was a member of the Stuckist group. In 2004, she was one of the fourteen "founder and featured" artists in The Stuckists Punk Victorian held at the Walker Art Gallery for the Liverpool Biennial. She promoted the second Paris Stuckist show in 2005.

In 2005, she illustrated a children's book. In 2006, the Tarot Museum in Bologna acquired a Tarot deck, which she had designed in 1999.

Dax was one of the ten "leading Stuckists" in the Go West exhibition at Spectrum London gallery in October 2006.

In 2008, she was the first signatory a petition to the prime minister asking him not to approve Sir Nicholas Serota as Tate director.

She spends her time divided between Camden in London and Paris. She is now a full-time artist. As well as painting her own work, she is also a collector of other Stuckist paintings by Ella Guru, Charles Thomson, Bill Lewis, Philip Absolon, Rémy Noë and Ruth Stein.

She is married to John Kerr, an architect.

== Art ==
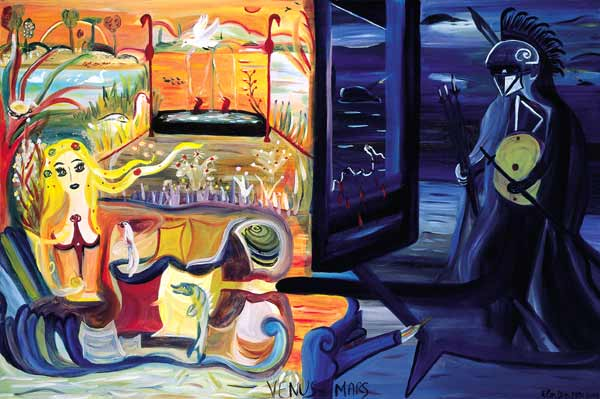
Elsa Dax. Venus and Mars

Dax said that she chose her themes of myths, legends and fairytales as "I find reality terribly sad and cruel. I need to escape to another dimension," and that her style has been likened to Chagall's. A large body of her paintings are of Greek mythology, composing a mass of figurative detail. She respects the force of nature.

Research for a painting is a combination of academic books on the subject and infant picture books, which leads to a few weeks' mental preparation for the main elements. The first part of the painting is the central character, around which other images evolve in an imaginative process to "discover images like you might discover figures in a cloud." It takes her three months to complete the painting.

She has said of her work:

My aim is to paint all the Greek and Roman gods and goddesses. I've been working on this series for eight years; it will probably take me another eight years to complete. I try to penetrate with my imagination into the essence of the god or goddess. After painting them I feel as if I'm protected by these deities on a spiritual level. When I painted Venus I felt quite happy and relaxed; Mars made me feel like Churchill – the warrior, the struggle. Venus and Mars don't appear to be intimate, but there is a subtle sexual union. His penis is about to enter her vagina.

== Solo shows ==
- 2002, Westminster Gym, Houses of Parliament, London
- 2002, Lourdes Museum, Pau, France

== Gallery ==
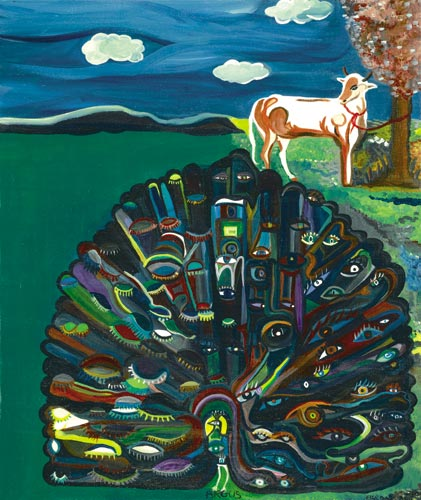
Argus

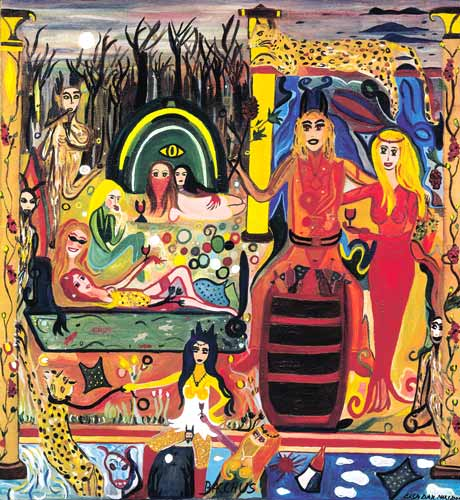
Bacchus

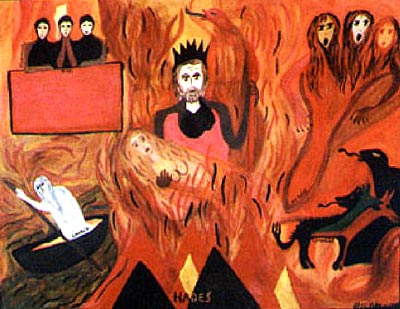
Hades

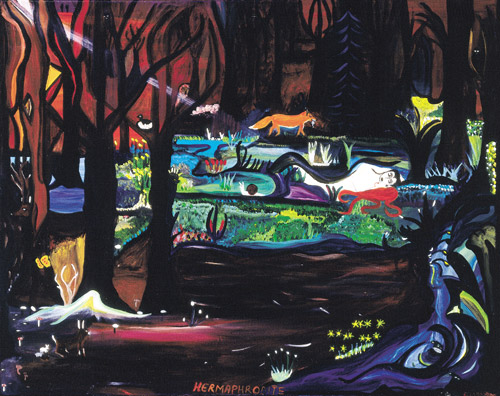
Hermaphrodite

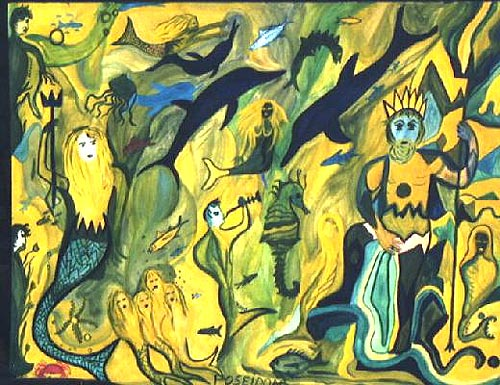
Poseidon

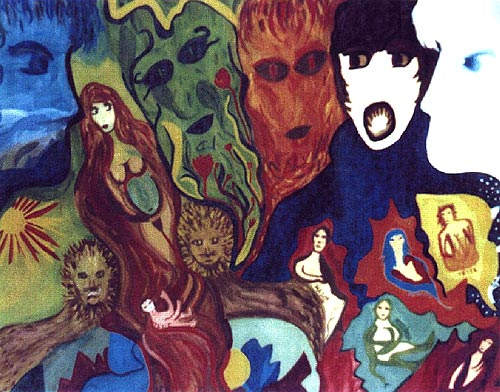
Rhea and Chronos

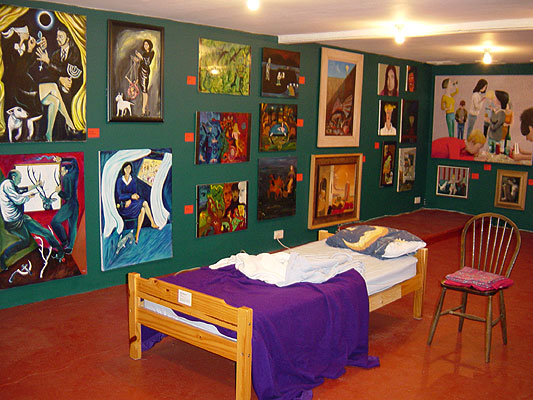
Work in the Stuckism International Gallery, 2003 (group of 6 behind the bed)

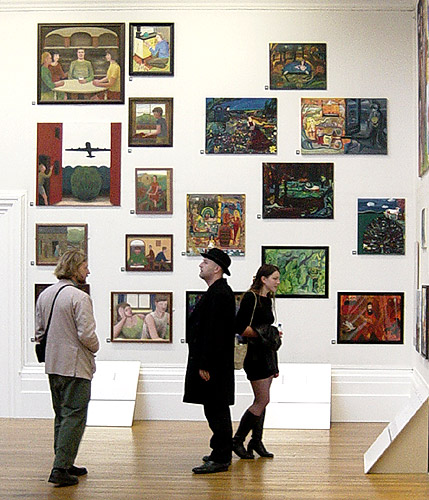
Work in The Stuckists Punk Victorian, Walker Art Gallery, 2004 (right side of wall)

== Notes and references ==
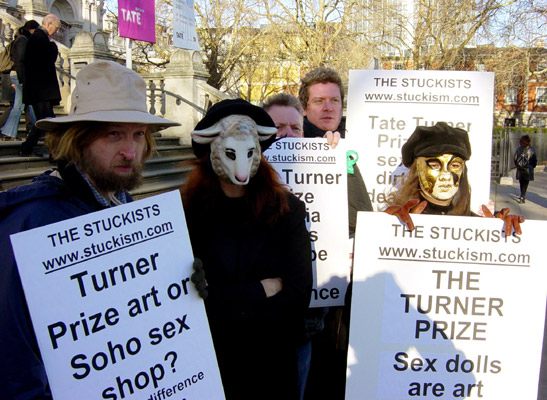
Elsa Dax (right) at the Turner Prize Stuckist demonstration, 2003
