= The Medway Poets =

English poetry performance group

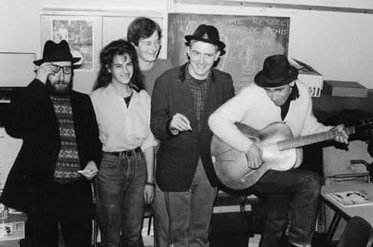
Sexton Ming, Tracey Emin, Charles Thomson, Billy Childish and musician Russell Wilkinson at the Rochester Adult Education Centre 11 December 1987 to record the Medway Poets LP

The Medway Poets were founded in Medway, Kent, in 1979. They were an English punk based poetry performance group and later formed the core of the first Stuckists Art Group. The members were Miriam Carney, Billy Childish, Robert Earl, Bill Lewis, Sexton Ming, Charles Thomson and Alan Denman. Others associated with the group include Philip Absolon, Sanchia Lewis and Tracey Emin. Most members also practised other art forms including music and painting.

== History ==
The origin of The Medway Poets was a series of readings called "Outcrowd" staged by Bill Lewis and Rob Earl from 1975 on the bank of the River Medway in Maidstone, Kent, in the Lamb Inn, later called Drake's Crab and Oyster House, at 9 Fair Meadow. These led on to readings promoted by a Medway College lecturer, Alan Denman, in the York Tavern & Railway Inn in Chatham, which brought The Medway Poets together, inspired by a fusion of the then-new Punk subculture and a historical reference to Berlin cabaret. Lewis named the group.

Alan Denman was a founding member, but the group stabilised to Miriam Carney, Billy Childish, Rob Earl, Bill Lewis, Sexton Ming and Charles Thomson. Others who read with the group included Philip Absolon and Sanchia Lewis (no relation to Bill Lewis).

The Medway Poets' appearances included pubs like The Three Daws at 6 Town Pier in Gravesend and colleges, sometimes with punk groups, as well as the Kent Literature Festival and the 1981 international Cambridge Poetry Festival. There were, however, personality clashes within The Medway Poets, particularly between Childish and Thomson, who said, "There was friction between us, especially when he started heckling my poetry reading and I threatened to ban him from a forthcoming TV documentary." However, a Television South (TVS) documentary on the group in 1982 brought them to a wider regional audience.

According to Billy Childish:

Me & Charles were at war from 1979 until 1999. He even threatened having bouncers on the doors of Medway Poet’s readings to keep me out. There were two camps in the Medway Poets from day one - me & Sexton versus everyone else. Bill came down on our side in the end. Rob Earl would have been with me & Sexton, but he wasn’t on the scene so much.

Thomson has also said this period was "an incredibly pressured and creative time and established the basis on which we are still working." He described the performances:

Bill Lewis jumped on a chair, threw his arms wide (at least once hitting his head on the ceiling). Billy sprayed his poems over anyone too close to him and drank whiskey excessively. Miriam told the world about her vagina. Rob and I did a joint performance posing, with little difficulty, as deranged, self-obsessed writers. Sexton finally introduced us to his girlfriend, Mildred, who turned out to be a wig on a wadge of newspaper on the end of an iron pipe. She liked his poems.

Thomson was "a very amusing poet, who avoided 'rant' and 'rap', conveying skip-along, punked up rhyming couplets – a Sir John Betjeman on speed – hilariously accompanied by props, sounds, music."

The Medway Poets album

After the Television South (TVS) programme, reunions were increasingly intermittent. An LP The Medway Poets was released on Hangman Records in 1988 with guest readers including Tracey Emin and Victor Templar. In 1988 they performed together for five shows at the Medway Arts Centre in Chatham, and Mid-Kent College in Maidstone, for an Amnesty International fundraiser for political prisoners. There was virtually no group activity during the early 1990s. In 1998, Lewis, Childish and Thomson discussed by phone a possible Medway Poets anthology. On 28 January 1999 Thomson suggested to Childish that they relaunch the group with an art agenda as the Stuckists, a name which Thomson had derived from a Childish poem, which quoted Emin's insult that Childish was "Stuck! Stuck! Stuck!" for his pursuit of painting, as well as his style of music and poetry. Bill and Sanchia Lewis (no relation), Ming and Absolon were also founder members.

The original group name still appeared occasionally, and in 2000, it was advertised on Ming's website that "Sexton and 3 other Medway Poets will be reading at the next Stuckism Show" on 20 May at the Metropole Arts Centre at The Leas, in Folkestone, Kent.

== Publications ==
The members of The Medway Poets published their work and that of others prolifically with imprints such as Victoria Press, Phyroid Press, Lazerwolf, Hangman and Cheapo. The early publications of the group were mostly xeroxed and stapled publications, and are now sought after. The Power House And Other Plays by Sexton Ming (The Phyroid Press, Chatham, 1980) is now selling for £50 as "First Edition. Very scarce and early piece from one of the founding members ... A near fine in stapled wrappers."

== Tracey Emin ==
Tracey Emin was a local art student, who did a foundation year at the Medway College of Design in Rochester (now the University of the Creative Arts), and became associated with the Stuckism group through her then-boyfriend, Childish. In 1995, during an interview in the Minky Manky show catalogue by Carl Freedman, when asked, "Which person do you think has had the greatest influence on your life?" She replied, "Uhmm... It's not a person really. It was more a time, going to Maidstone College of Art, hanging around with Billy Childish, living by the River Medway."

She took part in some of the later poetry performances. On one such occasion at the Gravesend Adult Education Centre, in the Victoria Centre on Darnley Road, she walked onto the stage in a mac. After a period of indecision, Emin removed it to reveal a pink basque and stockings, and read out poems by Childish, who in the meantime had quickly fled from the room.

Her first book of writing was "'edited' into reasonable shape" by (Bill) Lewis, printed by Thomson and published by Childish as Six Turkish Tales (Hangman 1987).

== Anthologies ==
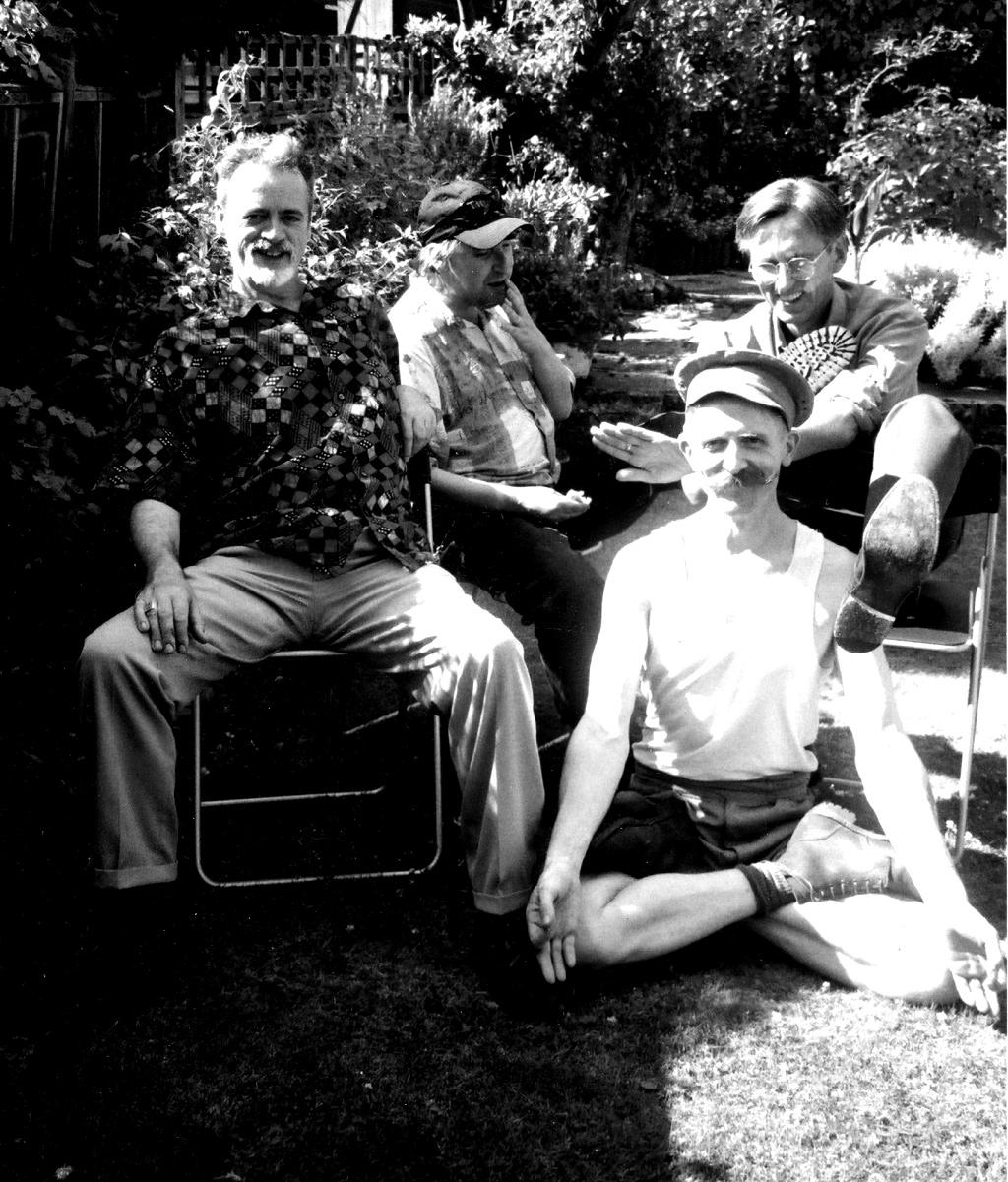
Bill Lewis, Sexton Ming, Robert Earl and Billy Childish (in yoga position), August 2003

This list is incomplete

- 1980: The Medway Poets (Cheapo Publications)
- 1980s: Fracture Clinic (Bill Lewis)

== Imprints ==
This list is incomplete

- Cheapo Press
- Phyroid Press
- Lazerwolf
- Hangman
- Victoria Press

== See also ==
- Medway scene
- Punk literature
- Stuckism
- 3:AM Magazine
