= Go West (exhibition) =

Coordinates: 51°31′10″N 0°8′28″W

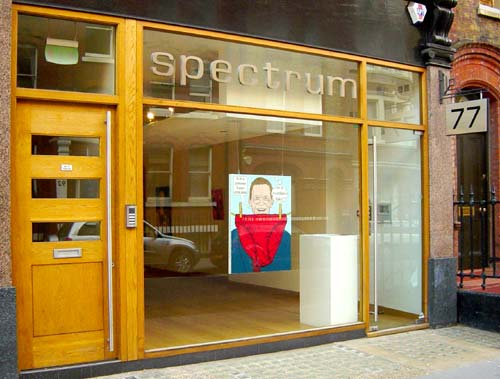
Spectrum London gallery, September 2006, during the Stuckists Go West show.

Go West is the title of the first exhibition by Stuckist artists in a commercial London West End gallery. It was staged in Spectrum London gallery in October 2006. The show attracted media interest for its location, for the use of a painting satirising Sir Nicholas Serota, Director of the Tate gallery, and for two paintings of a stripper by Charles Thomson based on his former wife, artist Stella Vine.

== Show ==
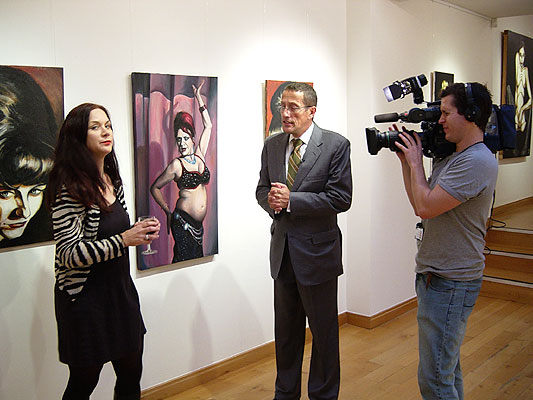
Exhibiting artist, Ella Guru, is interviewed at Spectrum London gallery during the show by Richard Quest of CNN International.

The Stuckists had previously been seen as art world outsiders, but with the backing of a West End gallery in a "major exhibition" became "major players" in the art world. Ten leading Stuckist artists were exhibited.

Royden Prior, the director of Spectrum London, said, "These artists are good and are part of history. Get past the art politics and look at the work."

Art critic Edward Lucie-Smith wrote in an essay for the show:

Stuckism has gained so much fame from its demonstrations and media campaigns that its real purpose is in some danger of being overshadowed. That purpose is perfectly obvious – to make art, and to have it seen and discussed without preconceptions, in a perfectly normal and rational fashion.

Rachel Campbell-Johnston, art critic of The Times, condemned the work as "empty of anything much" and "formulaic". Nevertheless, Thomson's and Joe Machine's paintings sold out, before the show opened, to buyers from the UK, Japan and the US.

Exhibition dates: October 6 – November 4, 2006.

== Controversy ==
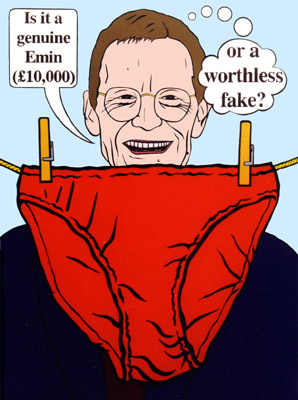
Charles Thomson. Sir Nicholas Serota Makes an Acquisitions Decision.

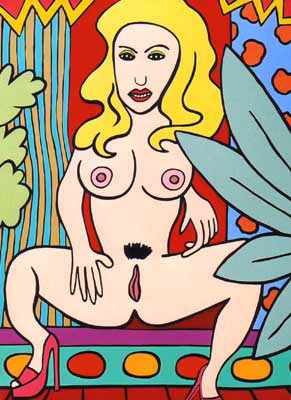
Charles Thomson. Stripper.

It was suggested that the exhibition of Thomson's painting, Sir Nicholas Serota Makes an Acquisitions Decision, satirising Sir Nicholas Serota, displayed in the gallery window (see image above), could be seen as revenge for the Tate's rejection of a Stuckist donation of 175 paintings the previous year.

Thomson was also accused of revenge for exhibiting two paintings of strippers, which he said were based on his ex-wife and one-time stripper, Stella Vine. She was briefly a member of the Stuckists group at the time of their marriage in 2001, but has since attracted solo attention. Rivalry increased when her work was promoted by Charles Saatchi in 2004. Thomson denied any intention of vengeance with the paintings and said that "I would prefer her to enjoy these, as I still enjoy her art".

Michael Dickinson, a Stuckist from Istanbul, was a guest artist at the show with a folder of collages. He had recently been released from ten days in a Turkish jail without charge after exhibiting Good Boy, a collage of the Turkish prime minister, Tayyip Erdoğan as a dog.

== Artists in the show ==
- Charles Thomson
- Joe Machine
- Paul Harvey
- Ella Guru
- Peter McArdle
- Philip Absolon
- Bill Lewis
- Wolf Howard
- Eamon Everall
- Elsa Dax

Guest artist

- Michael Dickinson

== See also ==
- Stuckism
- Stuckist demonstrations
- The Stuckists Punk Victorian
- Sir Nicholas Serota Makes an Acquisitions Decision
