= Peter McArdle =

English artist

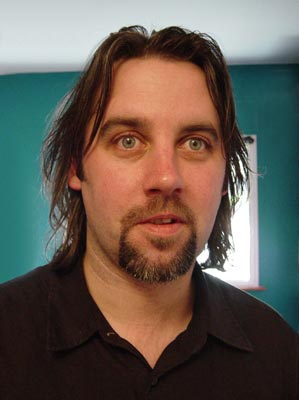
- Born: 17 December 1965 (age 60); Tynemouth, England
- Education: University of Sunderland, Jeffrey Johnson atelier
- Known for: Painting
- Notable work: On a Theme of Annunciation
- Movement: Stuckism

Peter McArdle (born 17 December 1965) is an English artist, member of the Stuckists art group, and gallery owner.

== Life and career ==
Peter McArdle was born in Tynemouth. He finished St. Aidan's RC School (Ashbrooke, Sunderland) in 1983, at which point he began to get sales for his paintings, which have supported him since. He gained a National Diploma in Art and Design at Newcastle College of Art and Design, 1983–85, then attended the University of Sunderland, from which he graduated in 1992. From 1992, he showed at Mark Jason Fine Art in Bond Street, London.

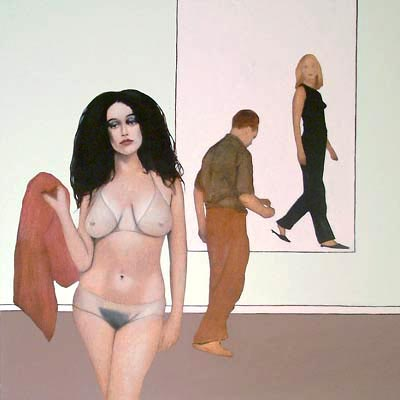
Artist and Model (Richter Revised) by Peter McArdle

In 1989, he was on the shortlist for the Winsor & Newton Young Artist Award. In 1997, during the Year of Visual Art, he was commissioned for work by the Tyne & Wear Development Corporation. He also received commissions from Arts Resource, Sunderland, and the City Council. From 1990, he participated also in group shows, including the Discerning Eye show at the Mall Galleries, London.

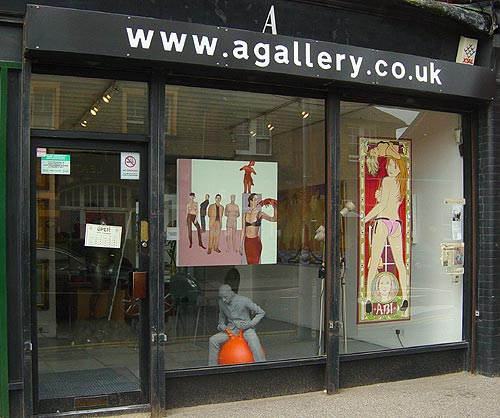
Peter McArdle's work (centre painting) in the A Gallery window, July 2007.

In 2003 he founded The Gateshead Stuckists group and was exhibited at the Stuckism International Gallery. He was a featured artist in The Stuckists Punk Victorian show at the Walker Art Gallery for the 2004 Liverpool Biennial, and was one of the ten "leading Stuckists" in Go West at Spectrum London gallery in 2006. In 2007, he was shown in I Won't Have Sex with You as Long as We're Married at the A Gallery.

In 2007, he became Head of the Foundation course at Northumberland College, and Fine Art lecturer on the BA course there.

== Art ==
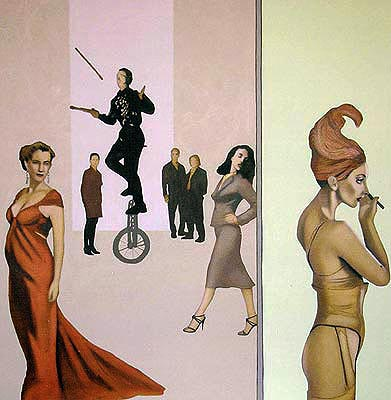
A Small Crowd Gathered by Peter McArdle

He is a dedicated worker, and has painted seven days a week and starting as early as 4 am. He paints in oil with traditional glazing techniques, taking six months or more per painting, sometimes working with a 000 ("cat's whisker") sable brush. A burnt umber underpainting can have up to seventeen layers of glazing. He rejects a third of the finished paintings.

Images are mostly one or several figures in an empty room, often seemingly unaware of each other's presence, and given titles that are equally enigmatic. He has said that the images "hover on the frontier between the familiar and the enigmatic, addressing a range of contemporary issues. They are an endless and imperceptible moving to and fro between dream and reality", and also that they draw on his personal experience, as well as art history and mass media popular culture, acknowledging the difficulty of his work, which requires time and engagement from the viewer.

He was reviewed by Paul Clark in the Evening Standard as "a top draughtsman with a funky fluid style" and in Art Review as someone who "augurs well for the future of British painting".

== Gallery ==
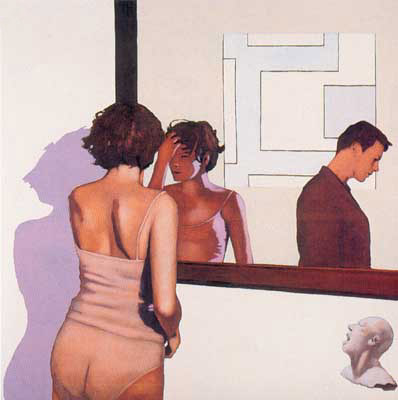
Silence Between

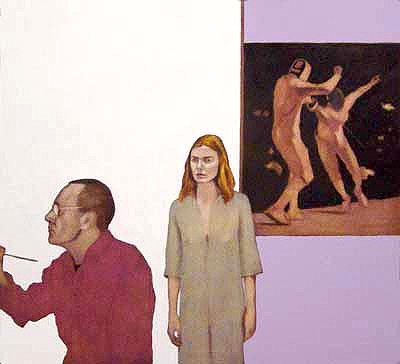
His Muse

== Notes and references ==
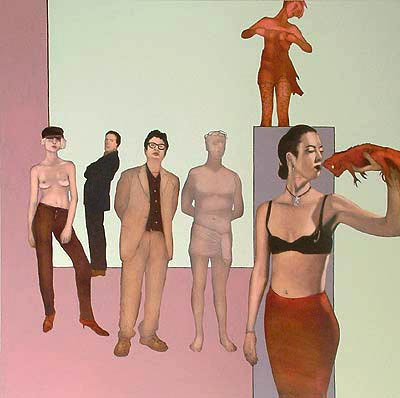
Strange Love by Peter McArdle
