= Jiří Hauschka =

Czech painter

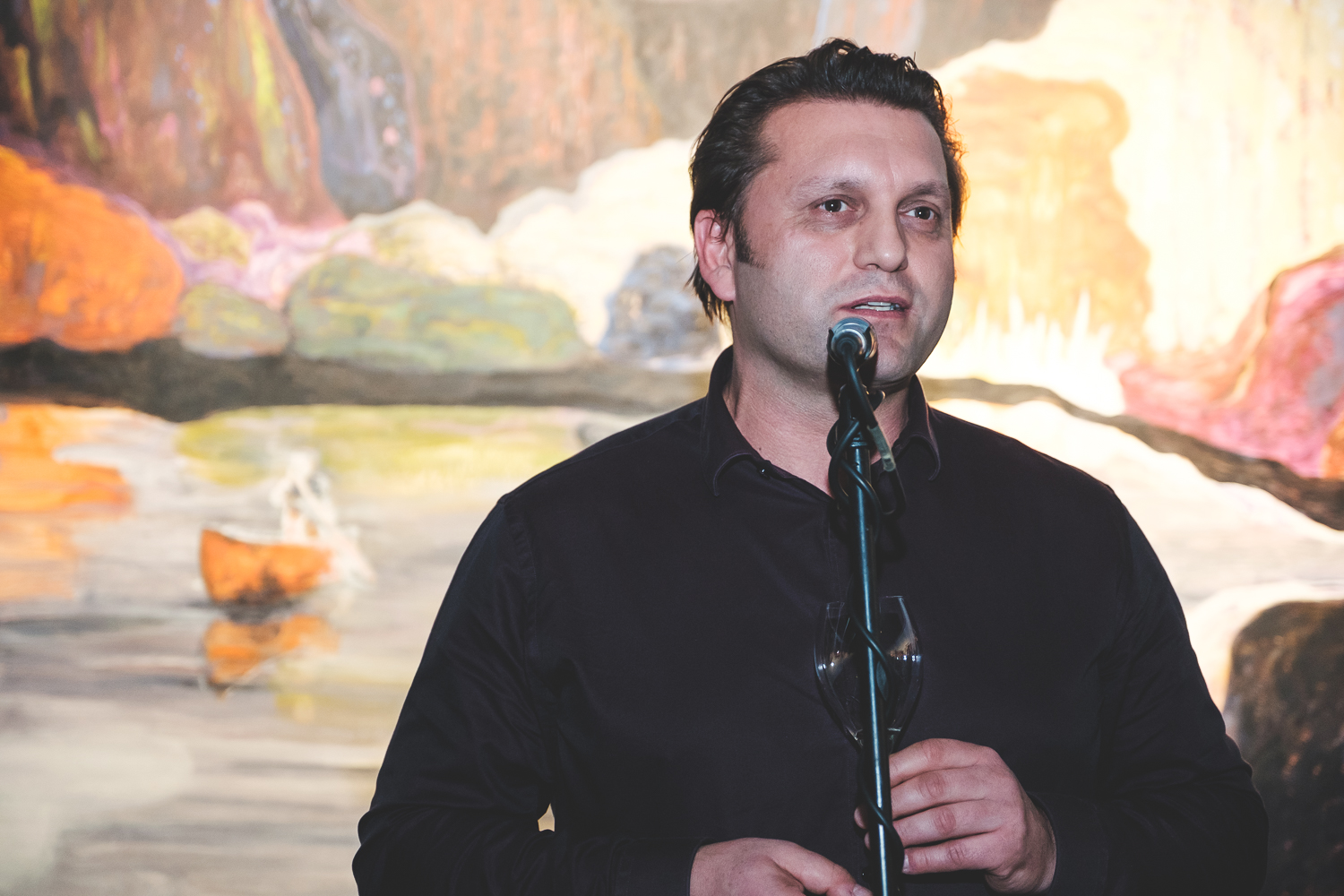
- Born: August 24, 1965 (age 60); Šumperk

Jiří Hauschka (born 24 August 1965) is a Czech painter and member of the Stuckists, an international art movement. Born in Šumperk, he now lives in Prague. He received a classical arts education. His work is borderline between abstraction and figuration. His works are represented in the National Gallery in Prague and in many private collections.

== Work ==
Although Jiří Hauschka has painted since childhood, he has never been fully devoted to painting. He described great interest in his teachers' art history lessons and developed an affinity for the Surrealists when they appeared as a subject. Despite this he still experienced painting losing ground to his numerous other interests. Only at the age of 38 he decided to turn all his attention to art work.

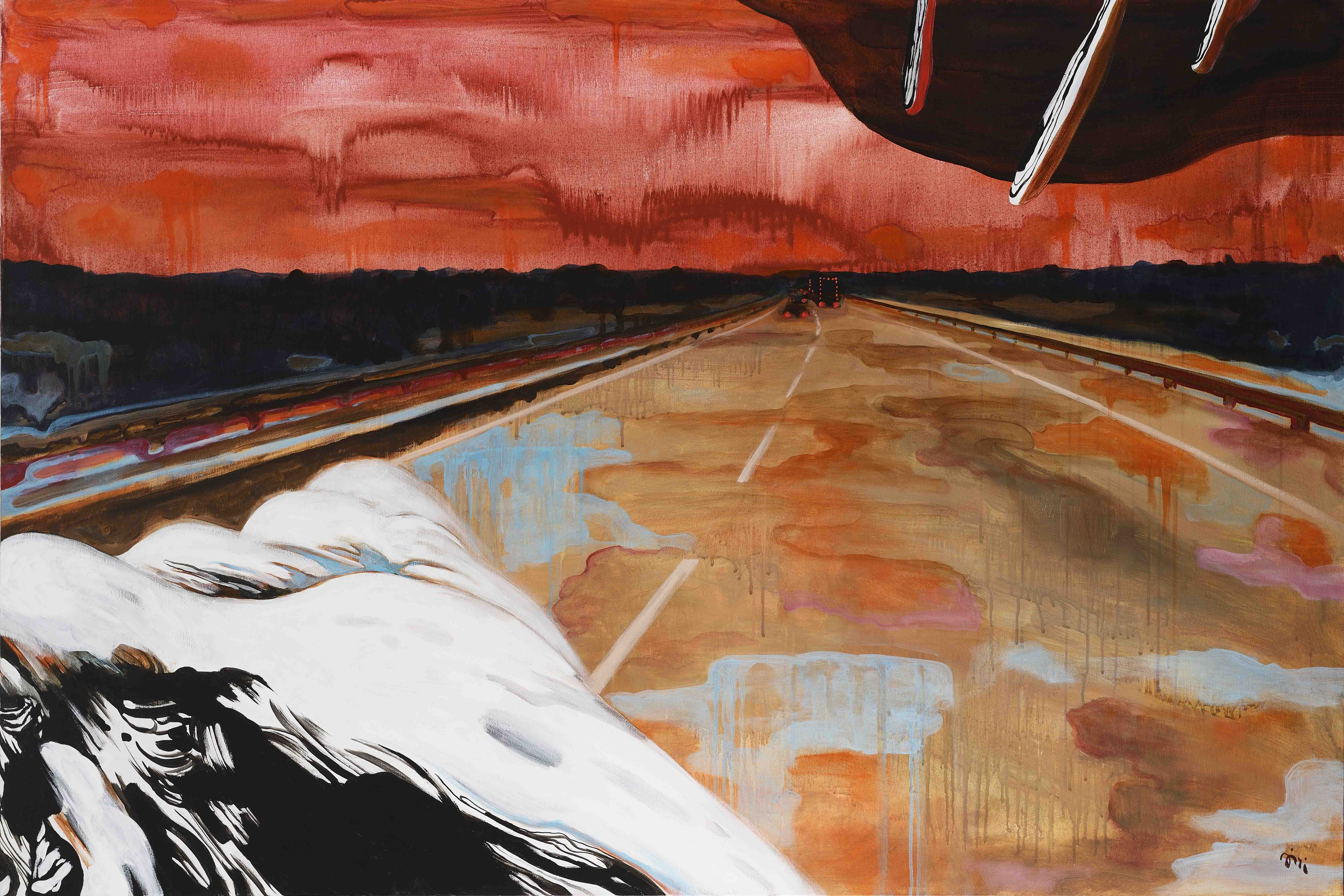
Work: Highway

At the beginning, his work was distinguished by abstract style. His artistic development was influenced by his stay in the United Kingdom in 2005 when he met Charles Thomson, the founder of Stuckism. At that time Hauschka left a strictly abstract style and focussed on detail and distinctive black line drawing, resembling pen drawing. After returning from the UK, he approached realistic conception; his work balances between abstraction and magic realism. The themes are inspired by the author's experience and perceptions (two worlds: deep inner and specific outer), which wind through the author's work.

He has a sense of the surface composition, a distinctive contour line, symbolic colourfulness and, in particular, characteristic fluidity of forms, adding organic dynamics to the depicted objects. His landscape paintings often reflect fascination with the magic and mystique of the forest, with an almost gloomy atmosphere of forest mists. Hauschka is fascinated by the spaces of a modern city which speak of their history. He is also attracted by the places where humans have left footprints, and often places a human figure into his compositions. Edward Lucie-Smith wrote about him: "Jiri Hauschka is one of the most interesting artists who have appeared on the Czech scene during a quarter century after the fall of communism."

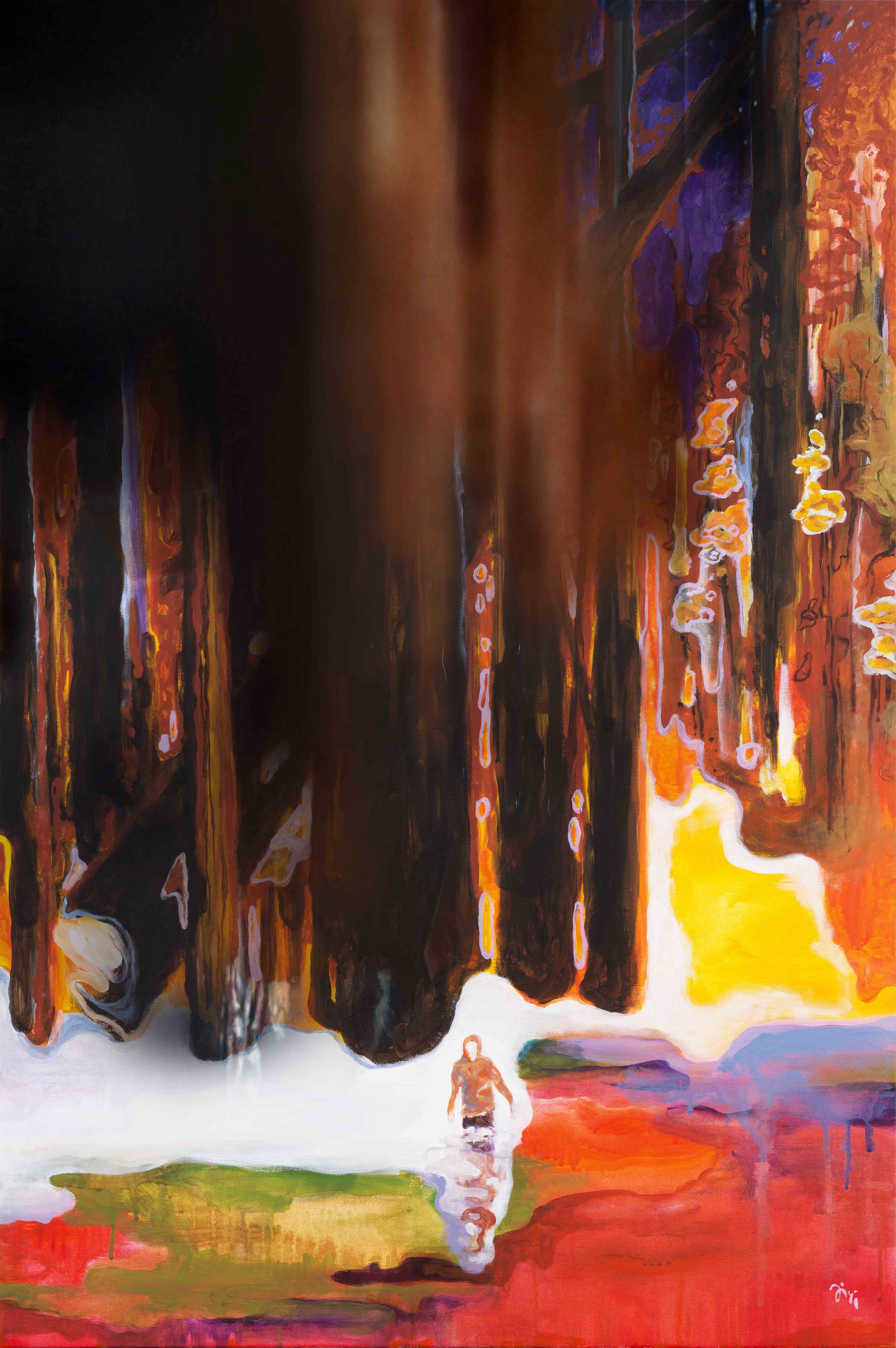
Work: Autumn bath

== Solo exhibitions ==
- 2022 Jiří Hauschka: Sovy nejsou tím, čím se zdají být, Městská knihovna T. G. Masaryka Šumperk
- 2021 Jiří Hauschka: Over There, Outside, Giudecca Art District, Venice
- 2020 Jiří Hauschka: Sovy nejsou tím, čím se zdají být, Art & Event Gallery, Prague
- 2017 Jiri Hauschka: In the middle of something, Crag Gallery, Torino
- 2015 Black Swan Gallery, Vernisage, Prague (CZ)
- 2015 House od Art Gallery, In the Middle of Somewhere, Prague (CZ)
- 2014 Era Gallery, Prague (CZ)
- 2014 Oko Gallery (Town Hall Gallery), Opava (CZ)
- 2013 Michal's Collection Gallery (with Albert Ruiz Villar), Prague (CZ)
- 2013 Magna Gallery, Ostrava (CZ)
- 2012 21st Century Gallery, Prague (CZ)
- 2011 Vltavín Gallery, Prague (CZ)
- 2011 Red Gate Gallery, London (with J. Valecka) (UK)
- 2011 Rabas Gallery, Rakovník (CZ)
- 2010 Stuckists and guests, 21st Century Gallery, Prague (CZ)
- 2010 Kotelna Gallery, Říčany (CZ)
- 2008 Dolmen Gallery, Prague (CZ)
- 2010 XXL Gallery, Louny (CZ)

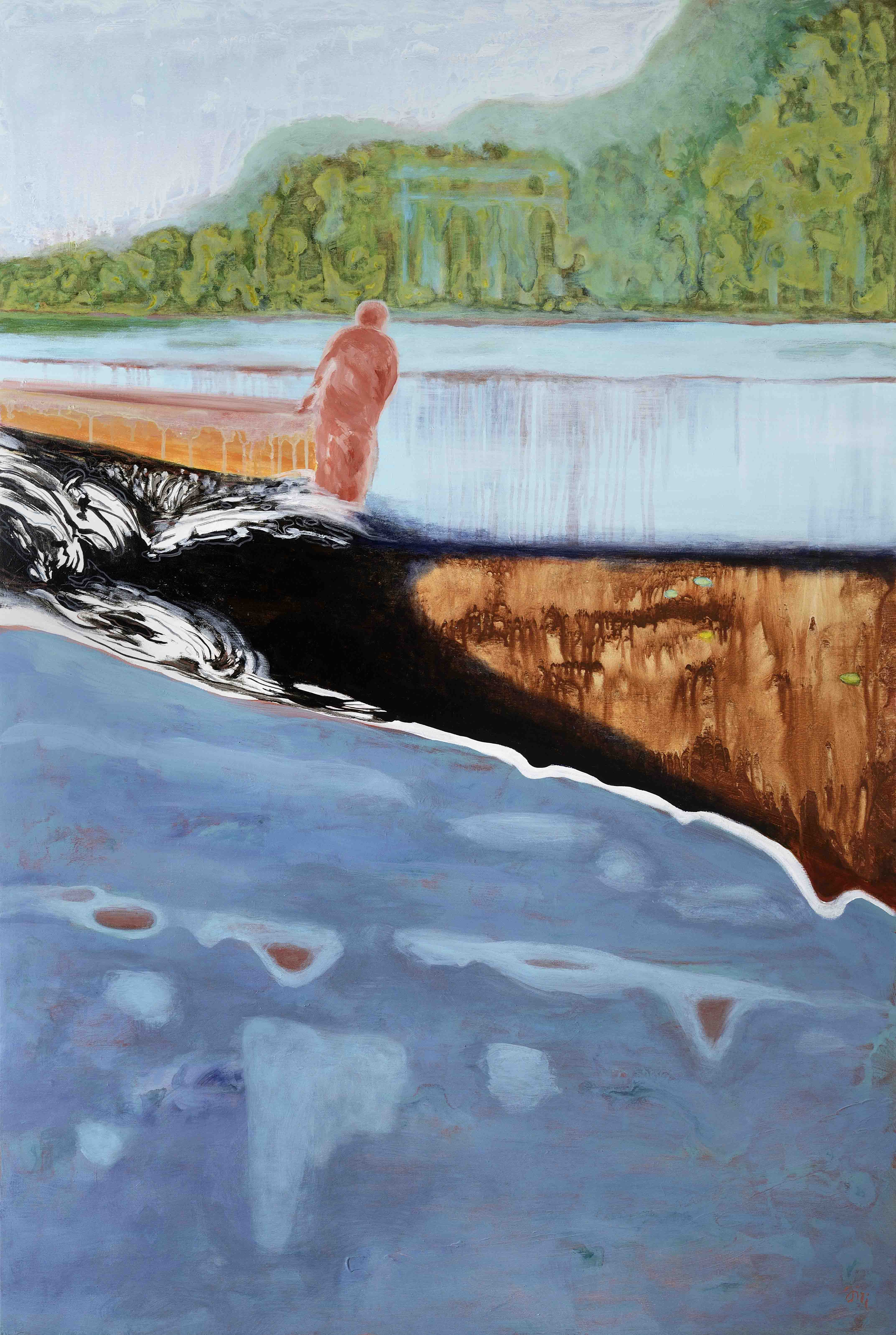
Work: Around Us

- 2006 The Residence Gallery, London (UK)
- 2005 Hellge Gallery, Passau (D)
- 2005 Town Hall Gallery Prachatice (CZ)
- 2004 Library Gallery Liberec (CZ)

== Group exhibitions ==
- 2016 Art Prague, Prague (CZ)
- 2015 Stuckism: Remodernising the Mainstream, Studio 3 Gallery, Canterbury (UK)
- 2015 Art Prague, Prague (CZ)
- 2014 Art and time, Black Swan Gallery, Prague (CZ)
- 2014 Gallery Goltozova tvrz, Golčův Jeníkov (CZ)
- 2014 The Stuckists, Explorers and Inventors, Phoenix (USA)
- 2014 STUCK!!, Vltavín Gallery, Prague (CZ)
- 2014 Group M, Gallery Rabas Rakovník (CZ)
- 2013 Stuck between Prague and London, Nolias Gallery, London (UK)
- 2013 Group M, Castle Kvasiny (CZ)
- 2013 Group M Gallery Mánes, Prague (CZ)
- 2013 STUCK in Pardubice, Town Hall Gallery Pardubice (CZ)
- 2012 Stuckists: Elizabethian Avant-Garde, Bermondsey Gallery, London (UK)
- 2012 Original and perspective, Klatovy – Klenová Gallery (CZ)
- 2012 Endangered species, ArtPro Gallery, Prague (CZ)
- 2011 Enemies of Art, Lauderdale House Gallery, London (UK)
- 2011 Prague stuckists, Town Hall Gallery Chrudim (CZ)
- 2010 Stuckists and guests, 21st Century Gallery, Prague
- 2010 „Summer choice“ Gallery Vltavín, Prague (CZ)
- 2010 „Private landscape“ Gallery S.U.V. Mánes Diamant, Prague (CZ)
- 2009 „Art at the castle“, Ostrava castle, Ostrava (CZ)
- 2009 „Prague stuckists“, Gallery Dolmen, Prague (CZ)
- 2008 „Stuck in the middle od November II”, Gallery Dolmen (CZ)
- 2008 Art Prague, Mánes, Prague (CZ)
- 2007 „Stuck in the middle od November”, Topičův salon Gallery, Prague (CZ)
- 2006 „The Brighton Stuckists” Art House Gallery, Brighton (UK)
