= Asim Butt (artist) =

Pakistani artist (1978–2010)

Asim Butt عاصم بٹ
- Born: 26 March 1978; Karachi, Pakistan
- Died: 15 January 2010 (aged 31); Karachi, Pakistan
- Education: Li Po Chun United World College, Indus Valley Institute of Art and Architecture
- Known for: Painting, sculpture
- Movement: Stuckism

Asim Butt (26 March 1978 – 15 January 2010) was a Pakistani painter and sculptor, with an interest in graffiti and printmaking. He was also a member of the Stuckism International art movement and founder of The Karachi Stuckists.

== Life and work ==
Asim Butt was born in Karachi. He attended Li Po Chun United World College. He started painting at an early age, but at his parents' insistence, went to college, where he studied Social Sciences from the Lahore University of Management Sciences. He began a Ph.D. in History at University of California, Davis (UC Davis) in California, United States of America, but left the course after two years, when he participated in a group show mounted at the San Francisco Arts Commission Gallery in March 2002 with Rigo '02 and LYRIC. He then returned to enroll in a B.F.A. in Painting in Karachi.

He participated in group shows in Karachi and Lahore, and in 2003 painted two murals in the environs of the shrine to the 8th Century Sufi saint Abdullah Shah Ghazi. This is an area visited by many people each day and also home to many of Karachi's homeless, including transgender people, beggars and drug addicts. One mural, about America's Shock and Awe campaign in Iraq, was called, 5 Ways to Kill a Man, inspired by Edwin Brock's poem. The other was about glue-sniffing children he encountered, while painting the first mural. Both murals were later whitewashed by city authorities.

In 2005, Butt founded the Karachi chapter of the Stuckist art movement. That year he did three interactive performative pieces, one of which sought to claim the Mohatta Palace Museum as a lived space, resulting in his being banned from it. In 2006, he graduated from the Indus Valley School of Art and Architecture, Karachi. In 2007, he participated in group shows, 13 Satellites (Lahore), Emerging Talent (Karachi) and Sohni Dharti, part of the Shanaakht festival at the Karachi Arts Council.

He spoke out against the imposition of emergency regulations in November 2007 by starting an "art protest" movement—spray-stencilling graffiti of an "eject" symbol of a red triangle over a red rectangle, an image which has now become widespread in Karachi. Butt said it was a representation to:

eject the military from the presidency. The sign could also be a red house (parliament dominated by the left) or simply a curious shape that reappeared in different parts of the city around the time of the emergency.

He was caught on two occasions and claimed it was school art project work. He says that people's dignity has been overtaken by the predominant social and economic power of the military.

While Butt increasingly came to view public political art as central to his art practice, he continued painting on canvas. Butt publicly and openly identified himself as gay even in the face of social pressure to avoid doing so. Nevertheless, he was ambivalent about being viewed as a "gay artist" preferring to describe himself as an "artist who happened to be gay." Much of Butt's art practice, including his public art, explored themes of gender, sexuality and masculinity and the male physique. He described Pakistani attitudes to homosexuality in these words:

"Pakistanis are generally tolerant of homosexuality but don't like to bring sexual politics into public. Men and women engage in homosexual acts without necessarily identifying themselves as 'gay'. However, western ideas of about [sic] sexuality do shape the identity and cultural practices of a growing middle-class 'gay' community."

He lived in Karachi's affluent Defence Housing Authority neighbourhood with his parents.

== Death ==
Asim Butt died on 15 January 2010, a news report stating that he had committed suicide by hanging himself in his residence.
