= Philip Absolon =

British artist

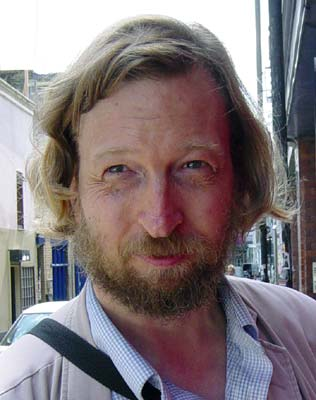
- Philip Absolon
- Born: 24 November 1960 (age 65); Erith, London, England
- Education: Medway College of Art and Design, Epsom College of Art
- Known for: Painting
- Notable work: Job Club
- Movement: Stuckism

Philip Absolon (born 24 November 1960) is a British artist and a founder member of the Stuckists art group, exhibiting in the group shows, including The Stuckists Punk Victorian at the Walker Art Gallery in 2004, and taking part in Stuckist demonstrations against the Turner Prize. He has had long-term unemployment problems, depicted in his work with imagery of skeletons; his other main subject is cats, which he studies and depicts in motion.

== Life and career ==
Philip Absolon was born in Erith, Kent, and is the great-great-grandson of the Victorian watercolourist John Absolon (1815–1895). He attended Rede School, Strood, and Educational Special Unit, Chatham (he is dyslexic). 1977–79, he was at the Foundation Art course, Medway College of Art and Design, along with future Stuckist artists, Billy Childish and Bill Lewis, who in 1979 formed The Medway Poets performance group with Charles Thomson and three others. This group—with which Absolon read, although he was not a formal member— was the core of the Stuckism art group founded in 1999.

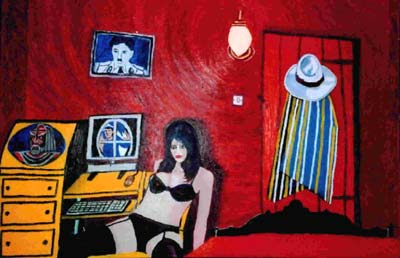
Philip Absolon. Primal Scream.

1979–82, he did a Diploma course at Epsom College of Art, where his paintings were thrown in a skip on the orders of the Principal. 1982–93 was spent either unemployed or in job training schemes for computer or office work. In 1984, his application for the Slade School of Fine Art was rejected, and so in 1987 was his application for the Royal College of Art, to which he submitted pictures of cats. 1993–94, he was on a Fine Art Access course at Maidstone College of Art, then accepted for a part-time degree, which financial constraints made him unable to accept; he was then awarded a grant for a full-time course, but his application was rejected. In 1999, he was accepted for an NVQ in horse care, which he could not finish as he had to undertake a mandatory Government Project Work placement. Childish provided a source of support during Absolon's difficult times.

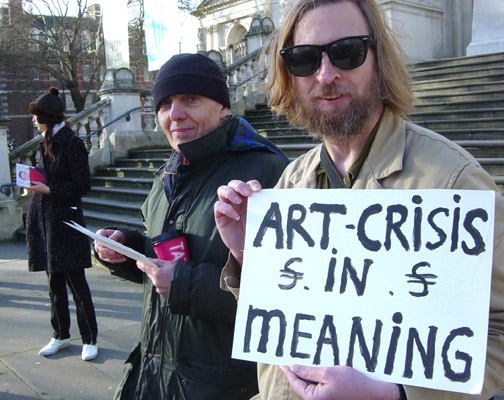
Left to right: Emily Mann, John Bourne and Philip Absolon at the 2006 Stuckist Turner Prize demonstration

In 1999, he was one of the founder members of the Stuckists art group, launched by Thomson and Childish; he has regularly exhibited in Stuckist shows, and also participated in most of the group's demonstrations against the Turner Prize at Tate Britain. 2003–04, he was Artist-in-Residence at the Rochester Adult Education Centre, Kent. In 2004, he was one of the fourteen "founder and featured" artists in The Stuckists Punk Victorian held at the Walker Art Gallery for the Liverpool Biennial.

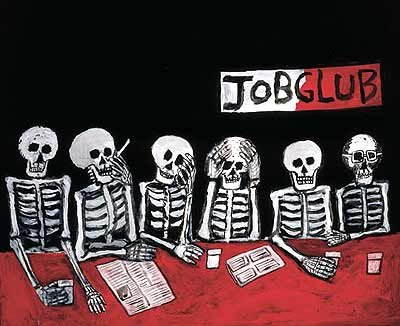
Philip Absolon. Job Club, c.1999.

John Davies, a Liverpool Church of England vicar chose Absolon's Job Club as his picture of the month in February 2005, saying, "Of all the striking paintings in The Stuckists: Punk Victorian exhibition ... Philip Absolon's hit me hardest. I get the impression a lot of Stuckists are well used to life on society's fringes, on the receiving end of welfare-to-work policies which just don't work for many. Absolon's pictures – many in this style and on this theme – seem born out of the awful experience of sitting in places like Job Clubs and feeling, well, skeletal, living dead."

In July 2006, he was selected by Matt Price for the Saatchi Gallery Your Gallery: Critic's Choice. Price said:

Some of the cat paintings are classics, but for me the most interesting works are those that depict people and unusual places ... The works appear unassumingly outsider and contentedly naïve, and as such are fascinating, curious and endearing paintings.

Absolon was one of the ten "leading Stuckists" in the Go West exhibition at Spectrum London gallery in October 2006.

He travels Europe by train in order to visit art museums and palaces. He has a strong interest in the German Hohenzollern Empire (1871–1918), and likes The Arts Club in Mayfair, London. He lives in a cottage in Norfolk, England.

== Art ==
Absolon has drawn regularly since he was sixteen, and still attends courses on sculpture, life drawing and painting. He always carries a sketch book with him, drawing, for example, customers in cafés. He studies cats in movement and draws them. Cats and skeletons are the main subjects in his work, which can be compared to Outsider art, but has much greater depth.

His working method is to enlarge the original drawing on a photocopier and then trace it onto the canvas with dressmaker's tracing paper. He usually paints from 8 to 10 at night. One of his paintings may take up to a month to complete.

He described the origin of his painting, Job Club:

They were all real people on a government unemployed scheme. They were builders apart from me, and they didn't want to be there. We'd all been doing it so long that I thought we would end up dead still doing it. I also disguised them because I didn't want to get beaten up. They're all portraits. I'm the middle one.

== Gallery ==
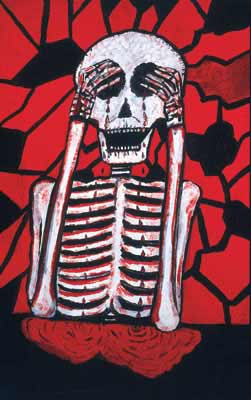
Breakdown

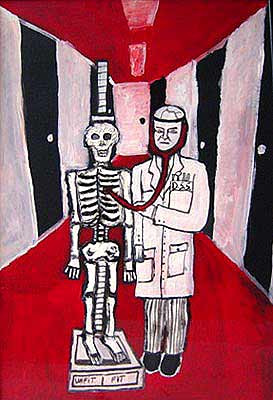
Fit for Work

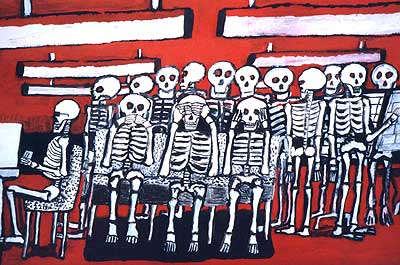
See No Evil, Hear No Evil, Speak No Evil

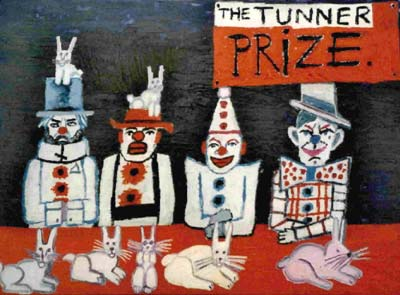
Turner Prize

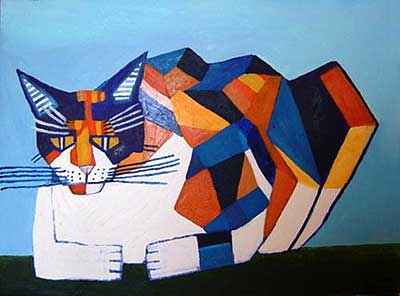
Cassie Thinking About Cubism

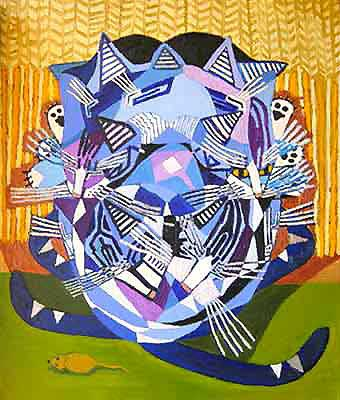
Cat Cleaning and Dead Mouse

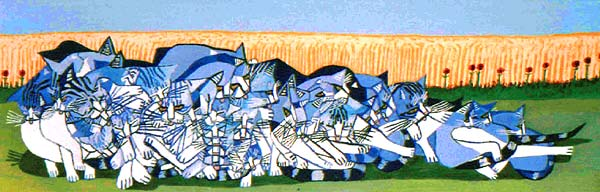
Cat Cleaning

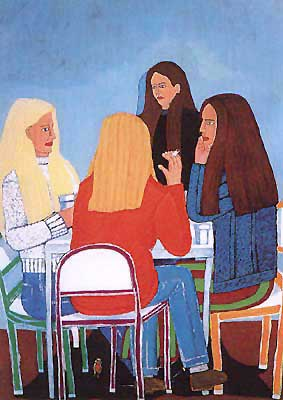
College Canteen

== See also ==
- Outsider art
