= Robert Janás =

Czech Stuckist Photographer and poet (born 1973)

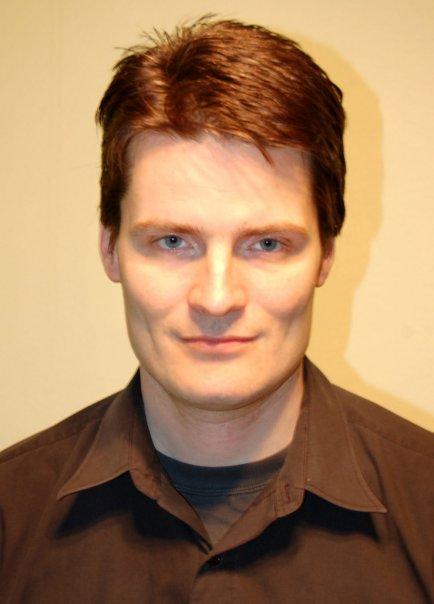
- Robert Janás
- Born: 30 April 1973; Brno, Czech Republic
- Education: Masaryk University
- Known for: Photography, Poetry, History of Art
- Movement: Stuckism

Robert Janás (born 30 April 1973) is a Czech Stuckist Photographer and poet. He founded The Prague Stuckists in 2004, and has curated shows of the group and held solo photography shows.

He has three books of poems, Blue Mist, Lamps of Emerald, Black Onyxes of Night and a short story collection Moonlight Street. He won the poetry prizes, Dies Academicus in 1998 and Šrámkova Sobotka in 1999 and 2000. He has also written papers on 19th-century painting and contemporary art, as well as articles in magazines including Art & Antiques.
