= Michael Dickinson (artist) =

British artist (1950–2020)

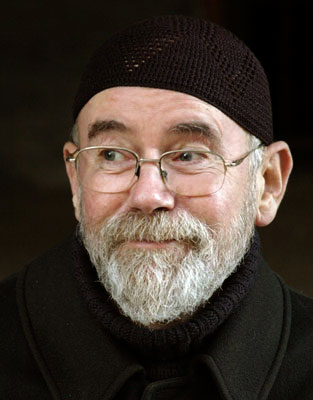
- Michael Dickinson
- Born: 1950; Durham, England
- Died: 2 July 2020; Highgate, England
- Known for: Collage
- Notable work: Tyrant's Pants, Best in Show, Good Boy
- Movement: Stuckism

Michael Dickinson (1950 – 2 July 2020) was an English artist, writer and playwright, who was best known for his satirical political collages. He was a member of the Stuckist international art movement. In 2008, Dickinson was arrested and prosecuted in Istanbul for a collage featuring the then Turkish prime minister Erdoğan, but was later acquitted.

== Life and work ==
Michael Dickinson was born in Durham, England, and spent most of his early years in Kuwait, where his father was an employee of the Kuwait Oil Company and where he attended the Anglo-American School. He later attended Fyling Hall school in Yorkshire. He lived and worked as an English teacher in Istanbul. He was the founder of the Istanbul branch of the Stuckist art movement, and also a writer, playwright and actor.

=== Collage banned by Tripod ===
In May 2005, Dickinson's web site, "The Carnival of Chaos", was blanked and he was informed by the host Tripod (a member of the Lycos group), "You are no longer an authorized member of Tripod. You have been removed because your web site violated our Terms of Service." This occurred after he had posted a collage, Tyrant's Pants, showing President Bush in his underpants with a cruise missile coming out of his rear and a swastika on his right buttock.

Tyrant's Pants collage by Michael Dickinson showing President Bush

The collage was a response to a photo which had appeared with the headline "Tyrant's in his pants" on the front page of the British tabloid newspaper The Sun, showing captive Saddam Hussein in underpants.

=== Turkish court case ===
In June 2006, the Istanbul police removed one of Dickinson's collages from a show in the city organised by the Global Peace and Justice Coalition. Dickinson stated that he hung his work in the show unknown to the organisers. The collage showed the Turkish Prime Minister Erdoğan as a dog being presented with a rosette by President Bush in a pet show. He was informed by Turkish authorities that he would be prosecuted for "insulting the Prime Minister's dignity"; the charge carries a sentence of one to three years.

The Times said: "The case could greatly embarrass Turkey and Britain, for it raises questions about Turkey’s human rights record as it seeks EU membership, with Tony Blair’s backing." Charles Thomson, co-founder of the Stuckist movement, wrote to British Prime Minister Tony Blair asking for his intervention: "It is intolerable that a country applying for EU membership should censor freedom of political comment in this way. I trust you will communicate your strongest condemnation and ask for this case to be abandoned immediately. I ask for your assurance that you will oppose Turkish EU membership in the strongest terms, until Turkey adopts the attitudes of the civilised world towards human rights." Dickinson said: "It’s such an Alice in Wonderland feeling. The law is so absurd ... This law exists in Turkey about insulting 'Turkishness' or the State. You’re not allowed to state your opinion."

In September 2006, Dickinson attended the trial of Erkan Kara, organiser of the Global Peace and Justice Coalition show, charged with insulting behaviour for exhibiting Dickinson's work. The prosecutor described Dickinson as "ill-intentioned", but declined to bring a case because of "lack of evidence". Hasan Gungor of the Istanbul-based group, Initiative for Freedom of Speech, attributed this to fear of international news, when the European Union has concerns over freedom of speech in Turkey.

Members of Global Peace and Justice Coalition remonstrated with Dickinson for distracting attention from their anti-Iraq War cause, and he then held up another collage showing Erdoğan as a dog with a lead of the stars and stripes; he was arrested and charged with insulting the Turkish prime minister's dignity with a trial date scheduled for October 2007. He was then held for ten days, three in prison and seven in the Detention Centre for Foreigners. During his transfer between facilities, he attempted to escape, but was shot at by a policeman, who recaptured him.

In July 2007, Dickinson's collages were displayed at the A Gallery, London, in the Stuckist show I Won't Have Sex with You as long as We're Married.

On 25 September 2008, he was acquitted of any crime, the judge ruling that although there were "some insulting elements" in his collage, it fell "within the limits of criticism". The case has favourable implications for Turkey's relationship with the European Union, which had called for an improvement of its human rights record. Dickinson said, "I am lucky to be acquitted. There are still artists in Turkey facing prosecution and being sentenced for their opinions."

In June 2009, Dickinson fled Turkey for his native country, Britain, after learning that his acquittal had been overturned. Unable to find work, he returned to Istanbul soon after. In January 2010, a Turkish court convicted Dickinson of mocking the Turkish prime minister and levied a fine. Refusing to pay the fine as a matter of principle, Dickinson faced up to two years in prison.

Dickinson's application for a residence permit was refused due to his 2010 conviction, but he remained in the country after the expiry of his tourist visa. He was arrested in October 2013 for shouting Gezi Park-related slogans at police, and detained after his expired visa was discovered. He was deported after some days (and banned from returning for five years), choosing to go to Barcelona rather than his native Britain.

=== “Retropulsion” and death ===
Shortly after returning from Turkey, after coming offstage Dickinson started to walk backwards. He identified as a sufferer of “retropulsion”, a psychological condition that he said caused him to only be able to walk backwards. In 2017, Dickinson said: “I am not acting. If it wasn’t for the retropulsion, I would much prefer to be walking forwards.”

On July 2, 2020, Dickinson died at his Highgate home of peritonitis resulting from a gut obstruction.

== See also ==
- Article 301 (Turkish penal code)
- Censorship in Turkey
- Human rights in Turkey
- Human rights in Europe
- International Freedom of Expression Exchange
- List of prosecuted Turkish writers
- Culture of Turkey
- Stuckism
- Stuckist demonstrations
- Böhmermann affair
