= Stuckism in the United States =

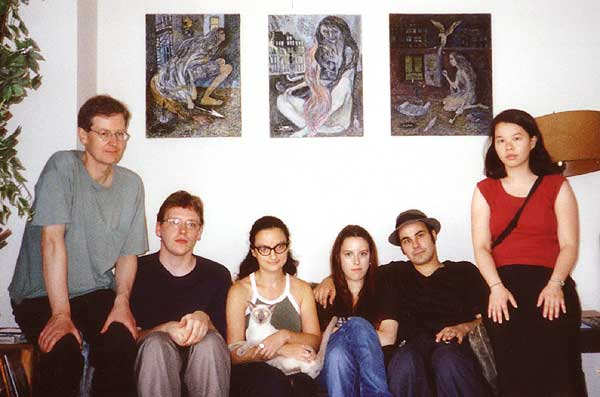
Left to right: Charles Thomson with US Stuckists, Nicholas Watson, Terry Marks, Marisa Shepherd, and Jesse Richards in Marks' New York apartment in 2001. The paintings on the wall are by her.

The Stuckism art movement was started in London in 1999 to promote figurative painting and oppose conceptual art. This was mentioned in the United States media, but the first Stuckist presence in US was not until the following year, when former installation artist, Susan Constanse, founded a Pittsburgh chapter.

In 2001, a Seattle branch staged a demonstration against a "tacky" city art project; and Jeffrey Scott Holland, a Kentucky artist, organized a traveling show of Stuckist paintings. In 2002, Jesse Richards and others founded a Stuckist gallery in New Haven, and staged a protest against the Iraq War.

In 2004, Richards, Terry Marks and others took part in The Stuckists Punk Victorian show in England. In 2005, Richards staged a show of Stuckist and Remodernist groups in New York. In 2009, Nick Christos and others founded a student group in Miami. As of June 2010, there are 40 Stuckist groups in USA.

== UK origin ==
The anti-conceptual art and pro-figurative painting art movement, Stuckism, was founded by Charles Thomson and Billy Childish in 1999, and named after an insult from YBA artist, Tracey Emin. The founding group in London had 13 members. In 2000, it was decided that other artists should be free to start their own groups also, named after their locality. Stuckism has since grown into an international art movement of 209 groups in 48 countries, as of November 2010.

The initial UK group was covered in the US media: On 25 September 1999, CNN International covered the first London Stuckist show, Stuck! Stuck! Stuck! of "a radical new art movement". In the October issue of the Virgin Atlantic inflight magazine, Hotair, Chrissy Iley said of the Stuckists, "there is a serious point to all this ... 'Brit Shit', as they refer to the work of Emin and her cohorts, has become all shock and no value." In June 2000, ARTnews, New York, covered the Stuckists.

== US Stuckism ==
In 2000, Susan Constanse founded the first US group. The Pittsburgh Stuckists—the second group to be founded outside the UK. This was announced in the In Pittsburgh Weekly, November 1, 2000: "The new word in art is Stuckism. A Stuckist paints their life, mind and soul with no pretensions and no excuses." Later that month, the paper looked at Constanse's show of work, Personal Thunderstorms, and said, "She believes conceptual art has alienated most viewers; art shouldn't be a private language; and that it should speak of the human condition."

In May 2001, the Seattle Stuckist group protested with placards, such as "Art-vertising is bad for the soul" and "Tacky and lame", against "Pigs on Parade", large fiberglass pigs which had been installed in the city and decorated by artists to make money for charity. Their objection was to commercial devaluation of art through "an insidious trend in corporate art-vertising. It appeals to the lowest public tastes by providing a kitschy, totally predigested and inoffensive McArt for the masses", especially as social or ethical comment is banned from the designs. King 5 News mentioned the group (with a "glib chuckle"), but otherwise the event went unreported. In 2001, Jeffrey Scott Holland of the mid-Kentucky Stuckists organised a traveling show of Stuckist paintings in the US. In 2001, Terry Marks contacted Charles Thomson after hearing about Stuckism on the radio; he visited her in NYC that spring, and she has participated in exhibitions with various Stuckist groups in the UK, US, Spain, France, Australia, & Iran.

Jesse Richards affiliated with the Stuckist art movement in 2001, and in 2002 with others founded a gallery as the first Stuckism center in the US, helping to organize shows. The center opened its doors with a show entitled "We Only Want to Do Some Fucking Paintings."

Jesse Richards	Tony Juliano
Richards and Juliano, with Nicholas Watson, organised the "Clown Trial of President Bush".

To "highlight the fact that the Iraq War does not have the support of the United Nations, thus violating a binding contract with the UN", The Clown Trial of President Bush took place at 7 p.m. on March 21, 2003 on the steps of the New Haven Federal Courthouse, staged by local Stuckist artists dressed in clown costume, led by Jesse Richards, Nicholas Watson and Tony Juliano. One of the participants was "a public defender for the state of CT. He thought it would be cool to dress up with us as clowns and do the thing. He ended up playing the clown judge. The courthouse that he works at is a block away from the federal courthouse where we did this."

Simultaneously the Stuckism International gallery run by them opened a War on Bush show, including work from Brazil, Germany and the UK, while the London equivalent staged a "War on Blair" show. The Yale Herald reported it with the headline, "Stuckists scoff at 'crap,' war". Richards took the opportunity to comment, "Duchamp would go over to the Yale University Art Gallery and he would say, 'This is crap,' and he would go paint a picture."

In 2004, US Stuckists Jesse Richards, Tony Juliano, Terry Marks, Jesse Todd Dockery, Brett Hamil and Z.F. Lively were included in the Stuckists' first show in a national museum, The Stuckists Punk Victorian in the Walker Art Gallery, England, during the 2004 Liverpool Biennial.

In 2005, Richards curated Addressing the Shadow and Making Friends with Wild Dogs: Remodernism, the first Remodernism exhibition in the US to include work from all of the Remodernist groups, including the Stuckists, the Defastenists, Remodernist Film and Photography, and Stuckism Photography. The show took place at the CBGB 313 gallery. In 2006, Richards was one of the artists in The Triumph of Stuckism, a show at Liverpool John Moores University Hope Street Gallery, curated by Naive John at the invitation of Professor Colin Fallows, Chair of Research at Liverpool School of Art and Design, and part of the Liverpool Biennial. Richards left the Stuckist movement in 2006.

Also in 2005, Tulsa Stuckist, Allen Herndon, also known as A. Sea Herndon, published online The Manifesto of the American Stuckists, which said, "[W]e are not a political group; we are painters ... Politics destroyed the spiritual aspects of Surrealism. The Los Angeles Stuckists group responded that this was a "strange definition" and that "the primary objectives of the Remodernist movement consists of uprooting postmodern thought and institutions. That is no small undertaking, and the process in large part has been, and will continue to be, an intensely political one."

In 2009, a group of students, led by Nick Christos, from Florida Atlantic University, founded the Miami Stuckists group and staged an exhibition at Grace Cafe & Galleries in Dania Beach of paintings, described by The Miami Herald as "forceful, compelling, spiritual, hopeful and obvious". Christos exhibited a picture of a clown missing one ear as a portrait of Damien Hirst, whose "work implies no ideas and is boring", Christos said. He continued: "Stuckism is a renaissance of modernism—it's re-modernism. We paint what we see." Other members of the group are Andrew Ackerman, and Ilya Alekseyev.

By November 2010, 40 Stuckist groups had been founded in the US.

== Shows ==
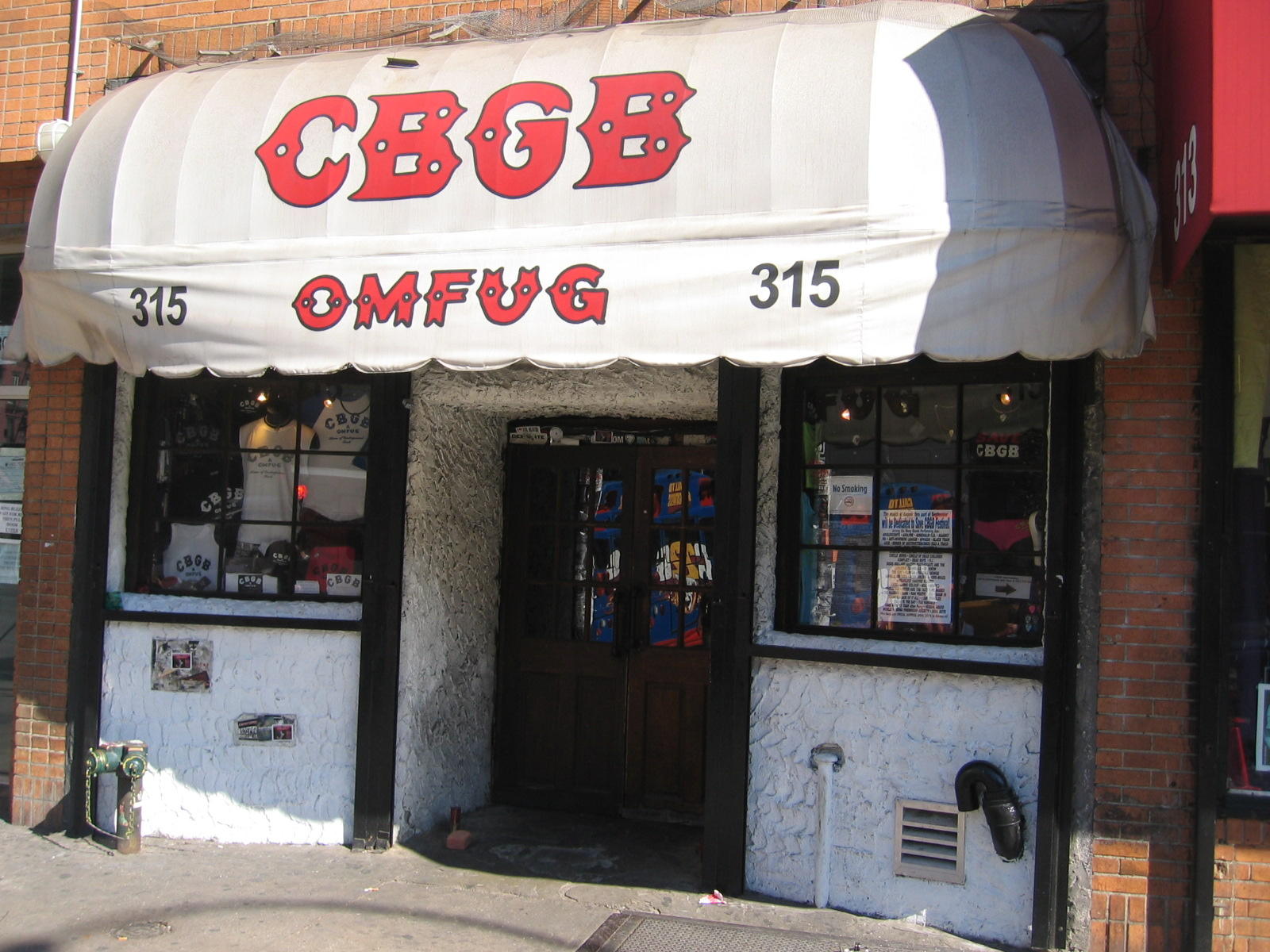
CBGB, New York

Group shows

- 2001 Travelling show (Richmond, Los Angeles, Seattle, Orlando, New Haven)
- 2002 Stuckism (Fringe Gallery, New Jersey)
- 2002 We just Wanna Show Some Fuckin' Paintings (Stuckist Gallery, New Haven)
- 2003 The War On Bush (Stuckist Gallery, New Haven)
- 2004 The Stuckists Punk Victorian In the Toilet
- 2005 Addressing the Shadow and Making Friends with Wild Dogs: Remodernism (CBGB's 313 Gallery New York)
- 2009 New Life: The Premiere Exhibition of the Miami Stuckists
- 2010 Stuck in Fort Lauderdale: The Raving Reactionary Miami Stuckist Daubers

Solo shows

Some solo shows promoted as Stuckist include:

- Terry Marks (New York)

== US Stuckist groups ==
These are shown in order of foundation with date of founding and founder(s).

- The Pittsburgh Stuckists (2000), Susan Constanse
- The Central Kentucky Stuckists (2001), Jeffrey Scott Holland
- The Seattle Stuckists (2001), Brett Hamil, Jeremy Puma
- The New Haven Stuckists (2001), Jesse Richards, Nicholas Watson
- The New Orleans Stuckists (2001), Barry "The Scatmuncher" Goubler

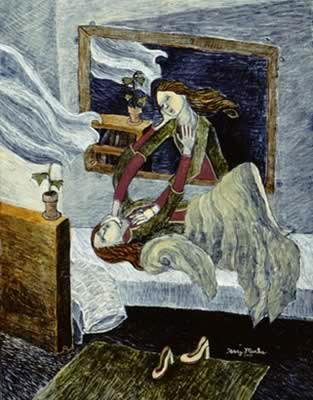
Terry Marks. Nightmare in a mirror, shown in The Stuckists Punk Victorian, 2004.

- The New York Stuckists (2001), Terry Marks
- The Minnesota Stuckists (2001), Dan Murphy
- The Delaware Stuckists (2001), Wilson Lakanuki
- The San Diego Stuckists (2001), Joe Morse
- The Chicago Stuckists (2001), Richard J. Cronborg
- The Connecticut Stuckists (2002). Tony Juliano
- The Florida Stuckists (2002), Selena'liunde
- The San Francisco Stuckists (2003), Frank Kozik
- The Long Beach Stuckists (2003), David Mark Dannov
- The Austin Texas Stuckists (2003), Vanessa Rossetto
- The Albany NY Stuckists (2004), Mark Wilson
- The Philadelphia Stuckists (2004), Anthony D. Palumbo
- The St Louis Missouri Stuckists (2004), Kim Richardson
- The Kentucky Mooleyville Sculpting Stuckists (2005), Meg White, Don Lawler
- The Minneapolis Stuckists (2005), S.R. Michaud
- The Reno Stuckists (2006), Peggy Clydesdale
- The Chicago Loop Stuckists (2006), Yoshi (Gakumei Yoshimoto)
- The Los Angeles Stuckist Group (2006)
- The Olympia (Washington) Stuckists (2006) Joseph Coon and Vince Verbatim
- The Oklahoma City Stuckists (2006), Colin Newman
- The Colorado Springs Stuckists (2006), David Graham
- The Tulsa Stuckists (2006), Allen Herndon aka A. Sea Herndon
- The Phoenix Stuckists (2006), Chris Hardy
- The Central Illinois Stuckists (2007), Robin Grant
- The Orange County of California Stuckists (2007), Nick Treadway
- The Amarillo Texas Stuckists (2008), Mardy Lemmons
- The Missouri Valley Stuckists (2008) Floyd Anthony Alsbach
- The Savannah Stuckists (2008), Zach Ryals
- The Fort Lauderdale Stuckists and St. Remy, Provence (2009), Jaff Noël Seijas
- The Lower East Side New York Stuckists (2009), Mike Rimbaud
- The Jacksonville Stuckists (2009), Virginia Andow
- The Missoula Stuckists (2009), Dylan R. Frey
- The Miami Stuckists (2009), Nick Christos
- The Boston Massachusetts Stuckists (2010), David Fichter
- The Lansing Stuckists (2010), Steev Lockhart

== See also ==
- Art manifesto
