= Terry Marks =

American painter

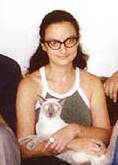
- Born: New York City, United States
- Education: New York Academy of Art
- Known for: Painting
- Movement: Stuckism

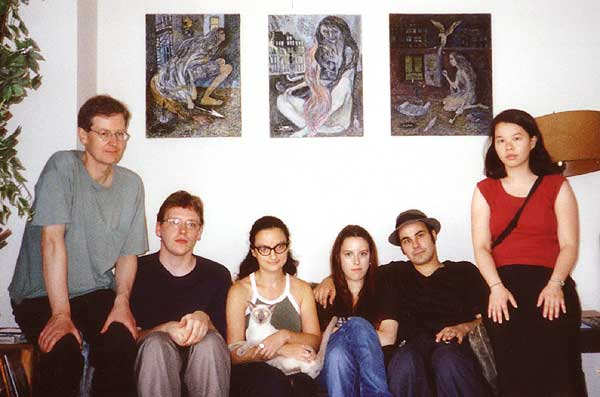
Left to right: Charles Thomson with US Stuckists, Nicholas Watson, Terry Marks (with cat), Marisa Shepherd, Jesse Richards and Catherine Chow in Marks' New York apartment in 2001. The paintings on the wall are by her.

Terry Marks is an American Stuckist artist in New York City. She was one of the US artists in the show The Stuckists Punk Victorian at the Walker Art Gallery during the 2004 Liverpool Biennial. She is also a tattooist and actor for film and television. Terry is a member of the Screen Actors Guild and the American Federation of Television and Radio Artists.

== Life and art ==
Terry Marks was born and raised in New York City. As a young teenager she met painter Joseph Wolins, known for his work during the WPA period, who became her first art teacher and mentor.

In 1980, she moved to London, England, where she lived for nine years, went to art college and worked in a lot of hellish pubs pulling pints for football hooligans. Marks received a BA Hons in Fine Art Printmaking from the Central Saint Martins College of Art and Design (1987) and an MFA in painting at New York Academy of Art (1993). After a chance hearing of a radio piece on Stuckism in 2001, she became founder of New York Stuckism, a local chapter of the international ReModernist art group. In addition to exhibiting with the Stuckists in England, she has also shown her work with the Melbourne Stuckists in Australia.

Other notable shows include her solo exhibition "This is Not an installation" (2004) at the Koi Gallery in Brooklyn, New York, and participation in the 1st Stuckist International (2002), Stuckist Centre, London. Marks has been exhibiting her work since 1982 and has taken part in many exhibitions in the United Kingdom, US, and Australia. Her work is in numerous private collections in the US & UK.

In a 2004 interview for NY Arts Magazine, she made the following statement about Stuckism that has been often quoted:

We all choose to be painters, but not as if rock & roll, television, cars, cinema, jazz, and the whole 20th century never happened.

On her process, she has said,

I arrange pictures I've collected in odd juxtapositions to trigger subconscious imagery and evoke a dream state. My compositions emerge from this process and the act of painting - lead white on a dark surface, then layers of translucent colours.

== Selected awards ==
- 1990 Dori Brown Award, Northern Arts Council (US).
- 1988 CCA Galleries Award for Print, Christies Contemporary Arts, London.
- 1987 Whitworth Young Contemporaries, Manchester England Whatman Paper Award,
- Young Printmakers Editions, Royal Academy of Art, London, UK.
- Whatman Paper Award, British Printmakers Council, UK.

== Gallery ==
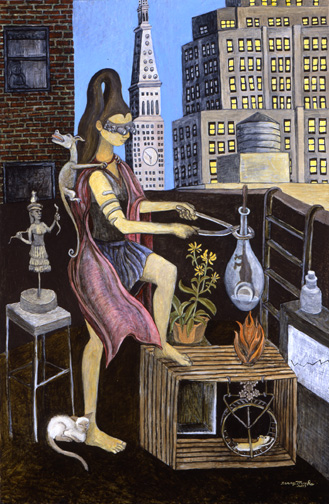
The Experiment by Terry Marks, 36 x 24 inches, Oil on canvas

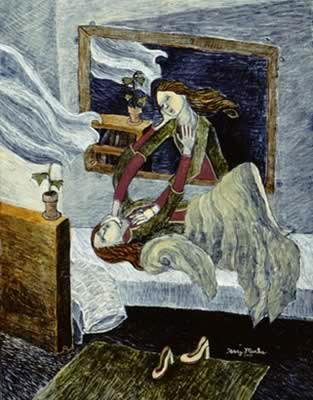
Nightmare Mirror by Terry Marks, 24 x 18 inches, Oil on canvas

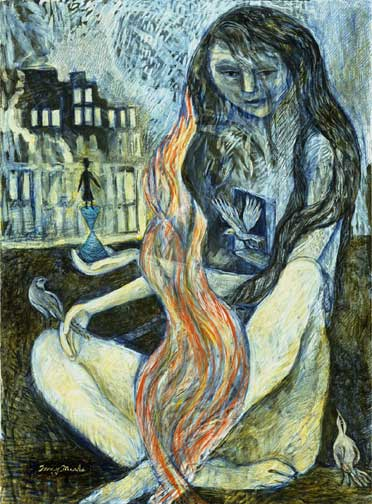
Burning the evidence by Terry Marks, 24 x 18 inches, Oil on canvas

== See also ==
- Remodernism
- Stuckism
- Stuckism in America
- The Stuckists Punk Victorian
