= Spectrum London =

Coordinates: 51°31′10″N 0°8′28″W

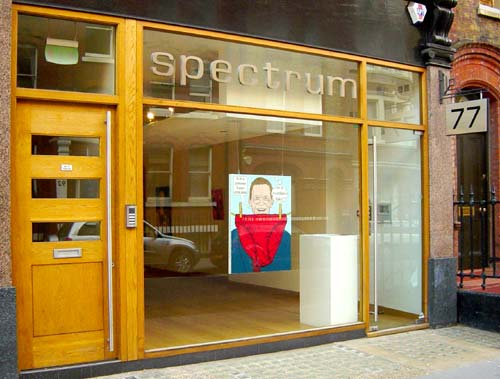
Spectrum London Gallery, September 2006, during the Stuckists "Go West" show.

Spectrum London was a London art gallery which showed contemporary figurative painting, photography and sculpture. It staged Go West, the first commercial West End show of the Stuckists, and a retrospective by Sebastian Horsley. It closed in 2008.

== Location ==
The gallery was at 77 Great Titchfield Street, London W1.

== History ==
In June 2005, the Spectrum London had a show of photographs by Dennis Morris documenting the daily lives, ceremonies and rituals of the Mowanjum Australian Aborigine community. The gallery was blessed by Aboriginal tribe leader, Francis Firebrace, wearing body paint and tribal dress.

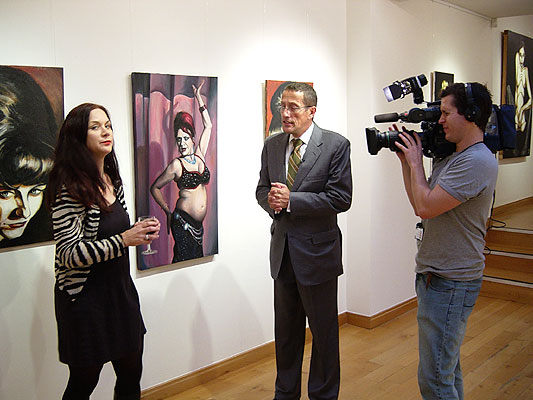
Ella Guru is interviewed by Richard Quest of CNN International during Go West at Spectrum London, October 2006

Spectrum London was the first West End commercial gallery to show the Stuckists, in the exhibition Go West in October 2006. This exhibition elevated the hitherto artworld outsiders into "major players", and occasioned controversy because of a satirical painting of Sir Nicholas Serota and nude paintings of Stella Vine by her ex-husband Charles Thomson." Ten leading Stuckist artists were exhibited. Thomson's and Joe Machine's paintings sold, before the show opened, to buyers from the UK, Japan and the US.

The gallery also exhibited work by Michael Dickinson, who was released from ten days in a Turkish jail without charge after exhibiting a collage of the Turkish prime minister, Tayyip Erdoğan, as a dog.

In March 2006, Venetian artist Ludovico de Luigi had his first solo show in the UK.

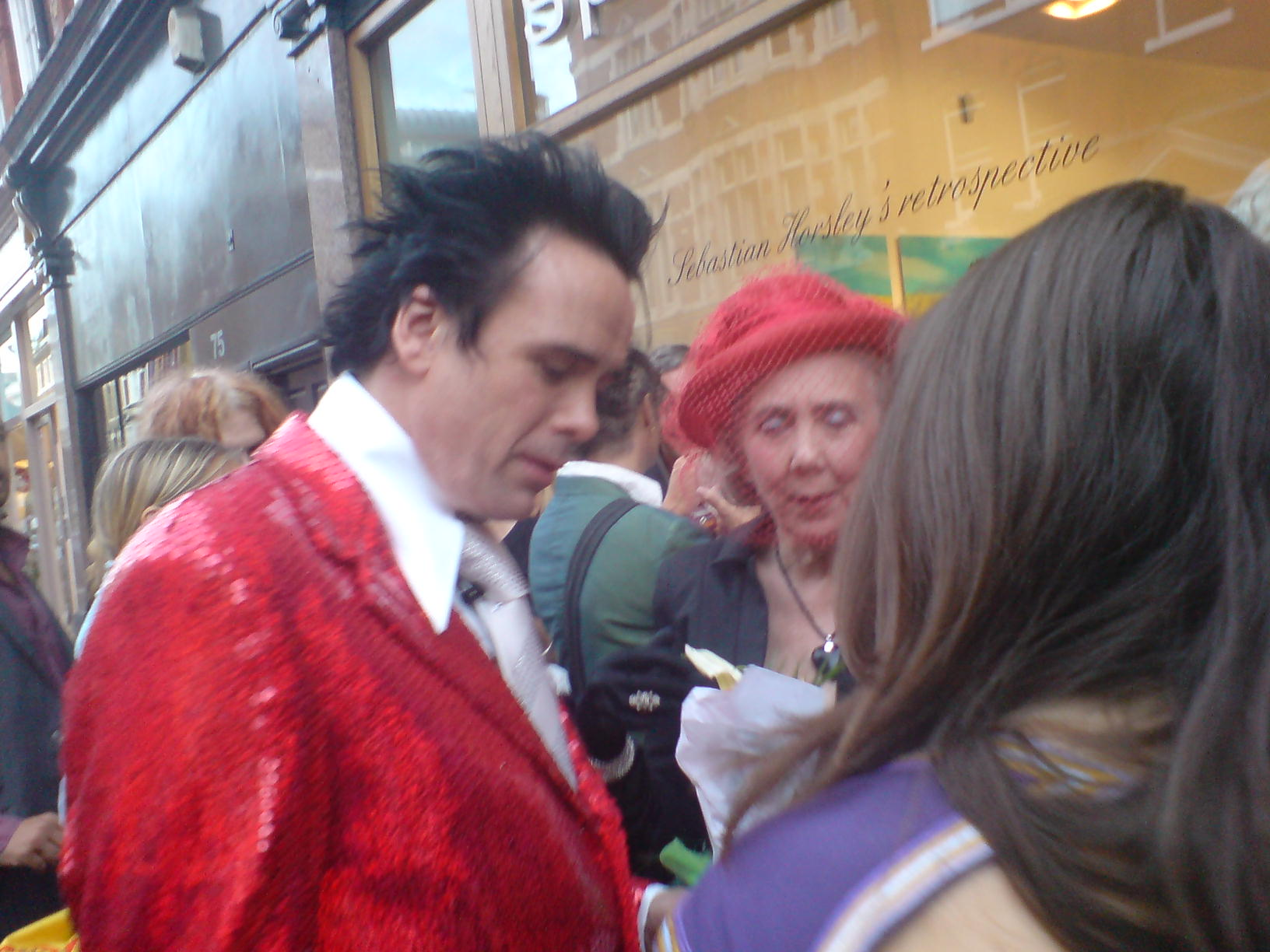
Sebastian Horsley and his mother, at a retrospective of his work at Spectrum London, 2007.

In September 2007, it staged Hookers, Dealers, Tailors, a retrospective by Sebastian Horsley. Horsley became known when he underwent a crucifixion in the Philippines; this show documented his diving in Australian shark-infested water and copiously ingesting deadly drugs.

Other artists shown at the gallery include Lennie Lee, Rita Duffy, Peter Murphy, Sir Peter Blake and Eduardo Paolozzi.

The gallery shut in 2008.

== See also ==
- Go West
- Stuckist demonstrations
