= Jeffrey Holland =

Jeffrey Holland may refer to:

- Jeff Holland (born 1997), American football player
- Jeffrey Holland (actor) (born 1946), English television actor
- Jeffrey R. Holland (1940–2025), American educator and leader in The Church of Jesus Christ of Latter-day Saints
- Jeffrey Scott Holland (born 1966), American artist and musician

== See also ==
- Geoffrey Holland (1938–2017), Vice-Chancellor of Exeter University
