= Stuckist demonstrations =

Art group activities

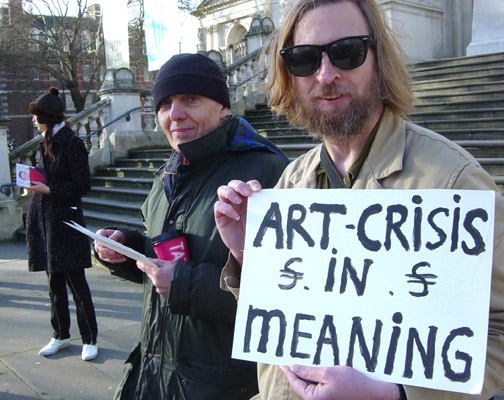
Stuckist artists demonstrate outside the Turner Prize, Tate Britain, London, 4 December 2006.

Stuckist demonstrations since 2000 have been a key part of the Stuckist art group's activities and have succeeded in giving them a high-profile both in Britain and abroad. Their primary agenda is the promotion of figurative painting and opposition to conceptual art.

Their demonstrations are particularly associated with the Turner Prize at Tate Britain (sometimes dressed as clowns to mock the museum), but have also been carried out at other venues, including Trafalgar Square and the Saatchi Gallery. There have also been other protests in the United States by US Stuckists, and there have been Stuckist events against the Iraq War in 2003.

They have received extensive media coverage for these events both in the UK and internationally, and become possible suspects for any London art protests, as in Matthew Collings' description of the opening of Tate Modern in 2000: "Guilt-free art lovers crossed picket lines put up by envious artist-outsiders. They didn't know who was protesting out there. Maybe it was the Stuckists." There is, however, no mention of any such demonstration on the Stuckism website. Sir Nicholas Serota, director of the Tate gallery, has recognised the demonstrations as a contribution to artistic debate, and the Tate archive contains material from the demonstrations, which are now a staple feature of the Turner Prize process.

== The Stuckists ==
The Stuckists were founded in 1999 by Charles Thomson and Billy Childish to promote figurative painting and oppose conceptual art. Thomson derived the name of the group from an insult by Tracey Emin to her ex-boyfriend Childish that he was "stuck". The original group of 13 artists has now grown to an international movement of 183 groups in 44 countries, as of November 2008. (Childish left the group in 2001.)

== Clowns at the Tate ==
The Stuckists have demonstrated annually at Tate Britain on the occasion of the Turner Prize since 2000, and have been featured extensively in the media for their appearances. The demonstrations have adopted a variety of themes to make their point, which is simply that the prize is named after a famous painter, but painting is neglected by it in favour of other media. Their Turner Prize manifesto comments: "The only person who wouldn't be in danger of winning the Turner Prize is Turner." This is a leaflet they have handed out to the public and prize ceremony guests. Although they have always been outside the building during the actual prize ceremony, they have, on two occasions, been mentioned by the guest of honour on live TV, just before the announcement of the winner—by Sir Peter Blake in 2003 and by Culture Minister, David Lammy in 2005.

=== 2000 ===
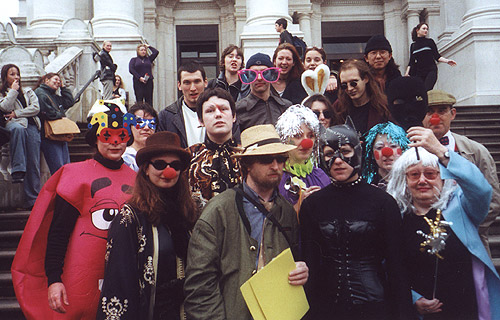
Stuckist artists dressed as clowns demonstrate against the Turner Prize, Tate Britain, in 2000

The first Stuckist demonstration took place outside Tate Britain on Turner Prize day, 28 November 2000. The group took care to work within the regulations in order to subvert them and ridicule the institution. They were dressed as clowns, and had obtained advance permission to enter the museum in this costume. They announced on their web site (and in the London Evening Standard):

this is not a demonstration in the normal meaning. This is simply the exercise of ones right to visit the gallery which one has paid for, in the attire of ones choice. We have a written statement from the Tate Gallery that the following is permissible dress for admission: suit and tie, trainers, jeans, T-shirt, sports clothing, barrister's wig and gown, Napoleonic military uniform, gorilla suit, clown costume .... the following is NOT permissible wear: naked, swimming costume, underwear.

Damien Hirst's godmother, the late Margaret Walsh, announced the "Art Clown of the Year" for "outstanding idiocy in the visual arts" was Charles Saatchi, the prize being a custard pie, which the winner was expected to purchase and administer on themselves. This award continued to be made in subsequent years.

They then paraded outside Tate Britain in clown costumes, walked into the museum and around the exhibition itself. To coincide with the Tate's show, they also staged their own concurrent show The Real Turner Prize Show with simultaneous shows of the same name in Germany and Australia. The Guardian announced the winner of the real Turner Prize with the headline "Turner Winner Riles the Stuckists".

=== 2001 ===
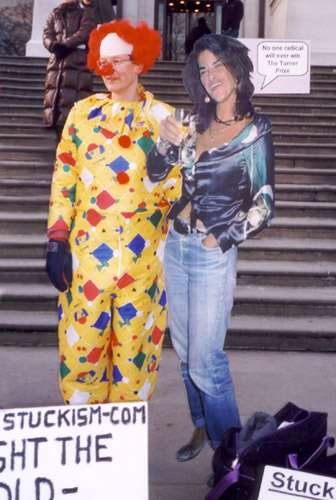
Charles Thomson at the 2001 demonstration with a cut-out of Tracey Emin

There was a demonstration in ordinary clothes at the Prize press launch on 6 November. The Independent on Sunday said, "In certain respects the Turner Prize never changes: art fleetingly makes the front pages; the dreary Stuckists protest outside the Tate and the winner gets a cheque for 20 grand."

Another demonstration took place on the Prize ceremony day, 9 December: this reached a worldwide TV audience, when it was syndicated by Reuters. The work of one nominee, Martin Creed, was an empty room, where the lights went on and off every five seconds. The demonstrators dressed in clown costume and shone torches in protest. Ekow Eshun wrote, "if scandal equated directly to success then this year's winners should probably be the Stuckists, the ragged band of artist malcontents who've turned their annual placard-waving anti-Turner protest outside the Tate into a kind of art event of their own that now generates press attention from around the world."

The Stuckists gave their "Art Clown of the Year Award" to Sir Nicholas Serota. Other nominees were Charles Saatchi (the winner in 2000), Norman Rosenthal and Sarah Kent.

=== 2002 ===
There was a demonstration at the Turner Prize press launch on 29 October, and one in clown costume on the prize day, 8 December. The "Art Clown of the Year Award" was given to Serota again, with the commendation, "The judges were extremely impressed by Sir Nicholas's ability to create a Turner Prize show which was even worse than last year's", and announced in The Daily Telegraph with the headline: "A custard pie for Serota as Turner Prize winner named." Meanwhile, the Stuckism International Gallery staged The Real Turner Prize Show 2002.

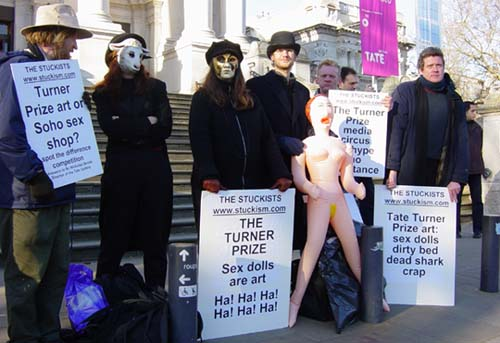
Stuckists artists satirise the Chapman brothers at Tate Britain, 7 December 2003

=== 2003 ===
In 2003, the Stuckists displayed two blow-up sex dolls to parody Jake and Dinos Chapman's bronze (painted) sculpture modelled on one. As guests, including Jay Jopling, Tracey Emin, Victoria Miro and Jake Chapman, arrived, they were greeted with the announcement, "Turner Prize preview—see the original here and the copy inside." Sarah Kent, art editor of Time Out, commented, "Fucking Stuckists... yes, you can quote me." Inside Tate Britain, on live television, Serota introduced Sir Peter Blake, who before he announced the winner, started his speech: "Thank you very much Nick. I'm quite surprised to be here tonight, because two days ago I had a phone call asking if I would be a judge for the Not the Turner Prize. And two years ago I was asked by the Stuckists to dress as a clown and come and be on the steps outside, so I am thrilled and slightly surprised to be here." There were cheers from the guests.

=== 2004 ===
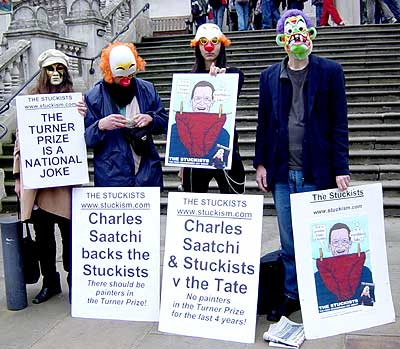
Stuckist protest against the Turner Prize, 19 October 2004, enlisting Charles Saatchi's name

There were two Stuckist demonstrations, one at the press launch on 19 October and one at the prize-giving day on 6 December. On 10 October, Charles Saatchi had been quoted in the press as saying there were not enough painters in the Prize—"For the last 10 years, only five of the 40 Turner Prize artists have been pure painters." The Stuckists turned this to their advantage with placards such as: "Charles Saatchi & Stuckists v the Tate" and "No painters in the Turner Prize for the last 4 years!"

The Turner show itself was characterised by video and computer imagery, including a virtual tour of one of Osama bin Laden's former residences. Thomson was quoted by the BBC website: "A lot of the stuff this year would be suitable for a Channel 4 documentary. There is no need for this to be in the Tate gallery when television does exactly the same thing."

To bring their point home, the Stuckists handed out a leaflet which read, with the mock tone of officialdom: "We apologise for the lack of art in this year's Turner Prize. As an alternative, you will find a display of enthusiasts' television programmes and computer games."

They also announced:

Charles Saatchi is winner of the Art Clown of the Year Award 2004 for posing as a leader in the arts and merely parroting ideas promoted by the Stuckists for the last five years.

The nominees for 2004 were:
Momart (for not having the Shark and the Bed in their warehouse)
Damien Hirst (for wasting his money buying work by Damien Hirst),
Charles Saatchi (for copying the Stuckists' ideas five years afterwards)
Stella Vine (for numerous reasons)

The Prize is a custard pie which the winner is entitled to purchase and push into their own face.

=== 2005 ===
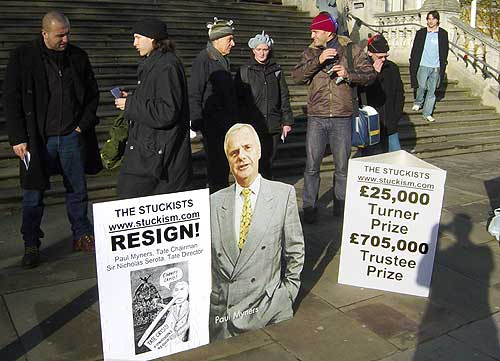
Stuckists outside the Turner Prize, Tate Britain, December 2005, demonstrate against the purchase of Chris Ofili's The Upper Room. The cutout is Tate Chairman Paul Myners.

The Stuckists demonstrated outside the Turner Prize on 6 December 2005 against the Tate's purchase of its trustee, Chris Ofili's work, The Upper Room. They displayed placards with slogans such as "£25,000 Turner Prize, £705,000 Trustee Prize", and wore monkey and elephant masks, referring to the monkeys Ofili had painted in his work, as well as the trademark balls of elephant dung it was propped on.

The demonstrators were approached by Sir Nicholas Serota, and the atmosphere was tense, according to Thomson: "I thought he was going to explode ... I looked at his face and I thought, this guy's going to lose it and hit me, or he's going to burst into tears."

Andrew Marr, a guest at the evening Prize reception, commented, "When they picketed us, the Stuckists seemed to me affable and intelligent people", although he strongly disagreed with them over Ofili's work.

That evening in front of guests at the award ceremony in what Marr described as a "moment of rare passion" and an "unusual, possibly unprecedented" move, Serota spoke out with "an angry defence" of the purchase, saying, "I defy anybody who has actually taken the time and trouble to see the work not to agree with the trustees' decision to acquire this most extraordinary and important piece of work."

Following this, David Lammy, the Culture Minister, made a brief speech before presenting the award, commenting, "Every year, the Turner Prize makes contemporary art the talk of the airwaves ... Stuckists threaten never to paint again", (although there is no evidence they had ever made such a statement).

The Stuckists were included in reports on the Prize by the four UK broadsheets and in a Reuters syndication internationally, where Thomson commented, "The Tate is run by a self-serving clique who hide behind secretiveness" and "The real prize at the Tate is becoming a trustee. It's worth far more money." The winner, Simon Starling had converted a shed into a boat and back again; The Times quoted Thomson that "The Turner should be renamed the B&Q diy prize."

=== 2006 ===
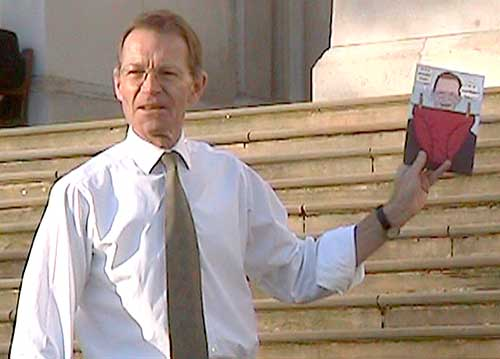
Sir Nicholas Serota holding a protest leaflet showing his portrait

The Stuckists handed Sir Nicholas Serota a demonstration leaflet with a Turner Prize "health warning" on one side (claiming that "the exhibits may cause drowsiness or headaches") and Thomson's painting of him on the other. He held it up and said, "Can't you make another image?" Tate chairman Paul Myners informed demonstrating artist, John Bourne, "We are grateful for the extra publicity the Stuckists have given the Tate".

The Stuckists picketed the 2006 ceremony with placards bearing the slogan 'Is It All A Fix?', a quote from Turner judge Lynn Barber, who had broken with convention by writing about the judging process in The Observer. She encountered the demonstrators, whilst going outside from the judging to have a cigarette, afterwards saying she was horrified to see her words displayed: "The words were taken completely out of context (I dread to think how often celebs have said that to me in interviews, and how often I have disbelieved them) but now I am stuck with being a hero of the Stuckist tendency. I scuttled back into the Tate and survived three hours without nicotine rather than risk encountering them again. Thomson's quote that winner Tomma Abts' work resembled "doodles done by a lobotomised computer" appeared in The Times and in media abroad.

=== 2007 ===
The Stuckists announced that they were not demonstrating for the first time since 2000, because of "the lameness of this year’s show, which does not merit the accolade of the traditional demo". They criticised the "recycling" of nominees as being laziness by the jury (two of the four had been nominated in previous years) and stated that Tate Chairman, Paul Myners had previously thanked them for giving the Tate extra publicity. They also claimed that Mark Wallinger had copied their idea of walking round a museum dressed in a costume, that he was indistinguishable from a Stuckist demonstrator, and that his work was "utter bilge", which had "all the excitement of watching a pensioner do the shopping at Asda".

=== 2008 ===
There was a demonstration by the artists, wearing black top hats, on 29 September, the day before the show opened, when they gave out a leaflet with a "Not wanted" poster for Serota and button badges with the text "The Turner Prize is crap", although they had not yet seen the exhibition. Condemning the Tate's promotion of conceptual art and the lack of figurative painting in the show (citing Stella Vine as one painter who has been passed over), Thomson said, "The work is not of sufficient quality in terms of accomplishment, innovation or originality of thought to warrant exhibition in a national museum." Demonstration material is stored in the Tate archive and Tate officials have thanked the demonstrators for generating publicity; Tate Britain director, Stephen Deuchar, said, "In a sense, that is the whole point of the prize: to encourage public debate." Richard Brooks, writing in The Sunday Times said of the Turner Prize show, "the mediocre standard has almost turned me into a supporter of the Stuckists."

=== Turner Prize manifesto ===
Childish and Thomson issued a Turner Prize manifesto, dated 1 September 2000. The text is:

1. Everyone talks about The Turner Prize but very few people believe in its worth. It has become an ongoing national joke, because of its pathetic and pretentious exhibits.
2. The Turner Prize is not, despite what Sir Nicholas Serota believes, the popularising of art but its dumbing down into a circus of curiosities.
3. The Turner Prize effectively turns The Tate Gallery into a state-funded advertising agency for Charles Saatchi, the Lisson Gallery and the White Cube Gallery.
4. Turner did not rebuild launderettes. He did not take photographs. He did not make videos, nor, to our knowledge, did he pickle sheep or construct concrete casts of negative space.
5. It should be pointed out that what Turner actually did was to paint pictures.
6. To call The Turner Prize The Turner Prize is like calling bubble-gum caviar.
7. The only artist who wouldn't be in danger of winning The Turner Prize is Turner.
8. To award The Turner Prize to an inferior re-hash of a Buster Keaton film is like awarding an Oscar to the workmen who paint the Forth Bridge.
9. If the Trustees of The Tate Gallery have any respect for the values to which Turner devoted his life, The Turner Prize must be awarded to an artist who continues the tradition of communicating the power of life through painting.
10. Alternatively, we propose that The Turner Prize should be renamed The Duchamp Award for the destruction of artistic integrity.

=== Tate response ===
Sir Nicholas Serota wrote to the Stuckists in 2005, rejecting a donation of Stuckist paintings, but saying he wanted to ensure "the Tate archive, as the national record of art in Britain, properly represents the contribution of the Stuckist movement to debates about contemporary art in recent years." In 2006, Tate chairman, Paul Myners, thanked the Stuckists for providing the Tate with extra publicity.

== New Blood feud with Saatchi ==
The Stuckists had declared their opposition to Charles Saatchi from the outset, criticising what they saw as the vacuity of Britart: "You can't help feeling that Saatchi's insipid sensationalism would make Duchamp wish that he'd never ever exhibited his piss-pot in the first place and had become a water-colourist instead."

=== A dead shark isn't art 2003 ===
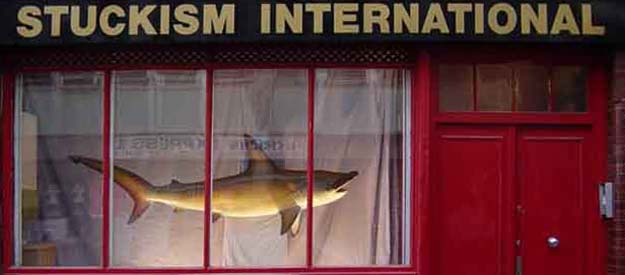
A Dead Shark Isn't Art, Stuckism International Gallery, 2003

In 2003, the Saatchi Gallery re-opened at County Hall with a Damien Hirst retrospective, which included the exhibition of his refurbished piece, The Physical Impossibility of Death in the Mind of Someone Living, a shark in a tank of formaldehyde. On the same day as the Saatchi opening, the Stuckism International Gallery in Shoreditch—under the title A Dead Shark Isn't Art— exhibited another dead shark, which had first been put on public display in 1989 (two years before Hirst's was first shown) by Eddie Saunders in his Shoreditch shop, JD Electrical Supplies. The Stuckists suggested Hirst may have seen this at the time and copied it, and pointed out that whether Hirst plagiarised Saunders work or not, Saunders was the real pioneering artist.

=== Stella Vine and OFT 2004 ===
In February 2004, Saatchi bought Hi Paul Can You Come Over, a painting of Diana, Princess of Wales, with blood coming from the mouth, by ex-stripper Stella Vine (it was then exhibited in Saatchi's next show, New Blood). There was international media reporting of this. Vine was talked of as "the new star of the Brit art scene", commenting, "I didn't think anyone really liked what I was doing", and that she had only been painting for four years "after accompanying her son Jamie, 18, to Hampstead School of Art" (a private college).

This caused a strong reaction from the Stuckists. Vine had for a short time been a member of their group, and they had first exhibited her in 2001, when she was also (briefly) married to Charles Thomson. She had even been a nominee for their Real Turner Prize Show. The Independent newspaper validated these claims and reported Thomson's complaint that Saatchi had been "stealing their identity as he tires of the Britart scene".

Thomson and eleven other people (including non-Stuckists, such as David Lee and Christopher Fiddes of the Movement for Classical Renewal) then reported Saatchi to the Office of Fair Trading. The grievance was:

Mr Saatchi's dominant market and PR position allowed him to achieve blanket coverage for a version of events which completely ignored her [Vine's] background with the Stuckists. Had this been known, it would have led to increased interest in the Stuckists as a group where new talent was fostered, and the likelihood of increased sales as collectors hoped to find another future star.

However, the complaint was not upheld and the OFT pronounced, "We do not have reasonable grounds to suspect that Charles Saatchi is in a dominant position in any relevant market", which Thomson turned to advantage by spotting the unintended slight and remarking that it was "just another cruel smack in the face" for Saatchi.

=== The Triumph of Painting 2005 ===
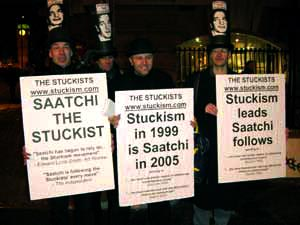
Stuckist demonstration at the Saatchi Gallery.

The Stuckists' concerns were not alleviated, when, at the end of 2004, Saatchi announced that he was putting his Britart holding into storage and devoting the next year to exhibitions featuring only painting. A few months prior to this announcement, Saatchi had stood outside the Stuckism International gallery, reading not only a placard that declared "STUCKIST ART IN 2001 IS SAATCHI ART IN 2004" (referring to Stella Vine), but also the anti-conceptual art, pro-painting Stuckist manifesto, which was on display.

Thomson responded immediately in the press to the announcement of Saatchi's change of direction, with the accusation: "almost verbatim, he's stolen the introduction to our manifesto."

When the show, The Triumph of Painting, opened at the Saatchi Gallery on 25 October 2005, the Stuckists mounted a picket outside, handing leaflets to the incoming guests (including Saatchi's wife Nigella Lawson), and displaying placards stating, "Stuckism leads, Saatchi follows" and "Stuckism in 1999 is Saatchi in 2005". They also wore tall hats with Saatchi's face on, and Thomson was photographed inside the gallery opening, wearing a T-shirt with the words "Saatchi the Stuckist".

== Other UK demonstrations ==
=== Trafalgar Square ===
The Stuckists demonstrated in 2001 in Trafalgar Square, when Rachel Whiteread's statue, Monument, was unveiled. This was a resin cast of the fourth (vacant) plinth in the square, and was inverted on the existing plinth. It represents the type of conceptual art that the Stuckists strongly oppose. The statue was unveiled by the then-Culture Secretary, Chris Smith, against whom Thomson was standing in the 2001 United Kingdom general election as a Stuckist candidate. At this point Stuckist protesters (one of whom was Stella Vine) in the watching crowd held up protest placards. Thomson jumped over the metal crowd barrier onto the now-vacant podium and used the PA system to make an address about the complete absence of paintings in that year's Turner Prize (referring to a comment by Smith the previous year that there should be more paintings in the Prize). At the same time he held up a placard, which read, "Mr Smith, do you really think this stupid plinth is a work of art?"

When the PA system was switched off by an official, Thomson made his way back through the crowd and was surprised to find that an angry Serota had followed him.

Serota: "That was a cheap shot, using another artist's work to promote your ideas."
Thomson: "It's Dada."
Serota: "So that gives you the right to do whatever you want to do whenever you want to do it?"
Thomson: "You and a few people like you control the art world and what goes on in it, and as artists this is the only way we can put our point of view across."
(At this point Serota walked off.)
Thomson: "That was Sir Nicholas Serota, the director of the Tate Gallery. Three cheers for Sir Nicholas."

The Stuckism website headed its report on the incident with a quote from Serota's book Experience or Interpretation: "a willingness ... to risk offence by unexpected confrontation can yield rewards"

=== The Death of Conceptual Art ===
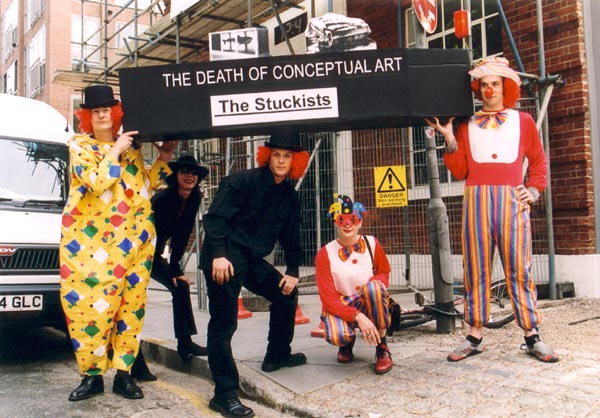
Stuckist artists leave a coffin, marked "The death of conceptual art", outside the White Cube gallery in Shoreditch, 25 July 2002.

In 1999, the Stuckists art group had declared themselves "opposed to the sterility of the white wall gallery system", and, three years later, they opened their own Stuckism International gallery (with coloured walls) in Shoreditch in a street adjoining the White Cube gallery, which represents Tracey Emin and Damien Hirst. To celebrate the opening on 25 July 2002, they dressed as clowns, processed the short distance from Charlotte Road over Old Street and deposited a coffin, marked "The Death of Conceptual Art", outside the White Cube's door with the comment, "This is the official date for the demise of conceptual art."

=== General election ===
In 2001, Stuckist Co-founder, Charles Thomson stood as a Stuckist candidate for the 2001 British General Election, on an anti-Britart ticket, in the constituency of Islington South and Finsbury, against Chris Smith, the Culture Secretary. Thomson picked up 108 votes (0.4%).

=== Cutting the string ===
In spring 2003, artist Cornelia Parker was allowed by the authorities to wrap Auguste Rodin’s sculpture The Kiss (1886) in Tate Britain in a mile of string. Many people felt it offensive to the original artwork and an act of vandalism rather than art. As a reaction, Stuckist artist Piers Butler cut the string, while couples stood around engaging in live kissing. However, this was described as an individual action outside the main Stuckist group by Thomson, who nevertheless took the opportunity to remark: "I was puzzled that Parker had been allowed to do her string-wrapping—thereby using another artist's work to promote her ideas—as this was precisely the allegation that an enraged Serota had thrown at me in Trafalgar Square and dubbed a 'cheap shot'."

== US Stuckist demonstrations ==
=== Seattle Pigs on Parade ===
In May 2001, the Seattle Stuckist group (J. Puma, Z.F. Lively, Amanda Perrin and Brett Hamil) protested with placards, such as "Art-vertising is bad for the soul" and "Tacky and lame", against "Pigs on Parade", large fibreglass pigs which had been installed in the city and decorated by artists to make money for charity. Their objection was to the commercial devaluation of art through "an insidious trend in corporate art-vertising. It appeals to the lowest public tastes by providing a kitschy, totally predigested and inoffensive McArt for the masses." (Social or ethical comment was banned from the designs.) King 5 News mentioned the group (with a "glib chuckle"), but otherwise the event went unreported. There was a certain amount of public support, and Hamil concluded: "For some reason, Stuckists are saddled with the task of vocalizing what everyone already knows, and yet that doesn't make it any less valid. It just makes it that much more regrettable that no one's said it yet."

=== Clown Trial of President Bush ===
In order to "highlight the fact that the Iraq War does not have the support of the United Nations, thus violating a binding contract with the UN", The Clown Trial of President Bush took place at 7 p.m. on 21 March 2003 on the steps of the New Haven Federal Courthouse, staged by local Stuckist artists dressed in clown costume, led by Jesse Richards, Nicholas Watson and Tony Juliano. One of the participants was "a public defender for the state of CT. He thought it would be cool to dress up with us as clowns and do the thing. He ended up playing the clown judge. The courthouse that he works at is a block away from the federal courthouse where we did this."

Simultaneously the New Haven Stuckism International gallery run by them opened a War on Bush show, including work from Brazil, Germany and the UK, while the London Stuckism International Gallery staged a "War on Blair" show. The Yale Herald reported with the headline, "Stuckists scoff at 'crap,' war". Richards took the opportunity to comment, "Duchamp would go over to the Yale University Art Gallery and he would say, 'This is crap,' and he would go paint a picture."

== Protest shows and art ==
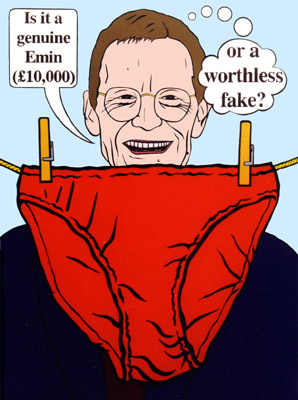
Sir Nicholas Serota Makes an Acquisitions Decision, 2000, painting by Charles Thomson

The Stuckists have made use of their art shows in order also to promote a message. The name of the group itself is an ironic pre-emptive riposte to their anticipated enemies—as represented in the first instance by former colleague-turned-YBA, Tracey Emin, who had called the group's co-founder, Billy Childish, "stuck". The group's first show in 1999 was titled, Stuck! Stuck! Stuck! In 2000, they made an overt challenge with a show titled, The Resignation of Sir Nicholas Serota. A painting in the show, Sir Nicholas Serota Makes an Acquisitions Decision by Charles Thomson, has since been reproduced in the media many times and become an iconic image for the Stuckists.

In 2005, another show was called: "Painting Is the Medium of Yesterday"—Paul Myners CBE, Chairman of Tate Gallery, Chairman of Marks and Spencer, Chairman of Aspen Insurance, Chairman of Guardian Media, Director of Bank of England, Director of Bank of New York. A Show of Paintings by the Stuckists, as Refused by the Tate Gallery. Guaranteed 100% Free of Elephant Dung.

The Stuckists Punk Victorian exhibition at the Walker Art Gallery during the 2004 Liverpool Biennial including a free-standing screen with paintings attacking the Turner Prize and the Tate gallery.

Michael Dickinson has exhibited political and satirical collages, addressing the Iraq War and world leaders, particularly US President George W. Bush. In 2006 he was told he faced prosecution in Turkey, where he lives, for his collage Best in Show, showing the Turkish Prime Minister Tayyip Erdoğan as a dog. He was subsequently prosecuted for a similar collage, Good Boy, and acquitted in a case that had implications for Turkey's application for membership of the European Union.

== Anti-Stuckism ==
There has only been one known anti-Stuckist demonstration, which was in 1999, when two Chinese performance artists jumped on Tracey Emin's installation My Bed, in the Turner Prize at Tate Britain. The pair had various words written on their bodies, including "Anti-Stuckism". Their explanation is that they were opposed to the Stuckists, who are anti-performance art. According to Fiachra Gibbons of The Guardian, the event "will go down in art history as the defining moment of the new and previously unheard of Anti-Stuckist Movement."

== See also ==
- Art manifesto
- Demonstration

== Notes and references ==
The online essay "A Stuckist on Stuckism" on stuckism.com is taken from the book:
Ed. Frank Milner (2004), The Stuckists Punk Victorian National Museums Liverpool, ISBN 1-902700-27-9
