= Andrej Tišma =

Serbian artist (born 1952)

Andrej Tisma was born in 1952 in Novi Sad, Yugoslavia. He graduated from the Academy of Fine Arts in Prague, Czechoslovakia in 1976. He has had solo exhibitions since 1972 (Novi Sad, Belgrade, New York, Milan, Seoul, Munich, Naples, San Francisco, London, Budapest, Tokyo, Bremen), and since 1969 has taken part in some 600 collective exhibitions in Yugoslavia and about 40 other countries.

Concerned with concrete poetry, mail art, photography, performance, electrography, video, web art, and music. He has been involved with the international mail art movement since 1974 and has organized about twenty mail art exhibitions in Yugoslavia and Canada.

Since 1996 Tisma has been dedicated to web art. His web-art works are included in the Net Art Idea Line, Whitney Museum of American Art, New York, USA; Rhizome Artbase, New York, USA; Net Art Guide, Stuttgart, Germany; Net Art Collection of the Irish Museum of Modern Art, Dublin, Ireland. He took part in the Ars Electronica festival, in Linz, Austria. He also works in the field of music.

He has been publishing art criticism and essays since 1976, in Yugoslavia and abroad. A collection of his articles, essays and rubber-stamp works was published in San Francisco by the Stamp Art Gallery in 1996.

Under the pen-name Andrej Zivor, he has published prose and poetry since 1977 in Yugoslavia and abroad (USA, France). Tisma is on the advisory board for the Web Biennial. He lives and works in Novi Sad, Serbia.
