= Paul Hartal =

Canadian painter and poet (born 1936)

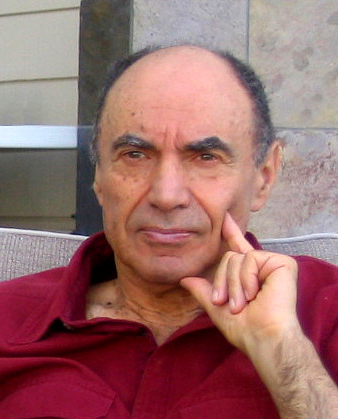
- Paul Hartal, 2008, San Diego, California, US
- Born: 1936 (age 89–90); Szeged, Hungary
- Occupations: Writer, Poet, Visual Artist, Literary Critic and Theorist

Paul Hartal (born 1936) is a Canadian painter and poet, born in Szeged, Hungary. He has created the term "Lyrical Conceptualism" to characterize his style in both painting and poetry, attempting to unite the scientific with the creative, or intuitive.

== Lyco art: Hartal's art theory ==
Lyco art, or lyrical conceptualism, is a term coined by Hartal.

In 1975, Hartal published A Manifesto on Lyrical Conceptualism, introducing Lycoism as a new art idea on the "periodic table of art". In this work, Hartal proposes a theory of art which runs contrary to what he claims is the traditional belief, that emotion and intellect are at odds with each other. Hartal proposes the idea that artists should be allowed to contribute to the emotional and intellectual development of society as scientists do. In 1975, the Lyrical Conceptualism Society was established in Canada, directed by Hartal.

In Mazes for the Mind, Clifford Pickover draws attention to Hartal's view that we need the imagination, the insight, and the lateral reasoning faculty, as well as human values, which are excluded from the rigid methodology of science but are intrinsic to art: "The present human condition calls for the rise of a new, inclusive form of culture in which art should play a most prominent role."

However, in introducing the notion of Lycoism, Hartal did not intend to form a new post-conceptualist splinter-trend; instead, his intention was the creation of a new philosophy of art in which the tearing down of the boundaries between art and science, the interlacement of the intuitive and the exact, and incorporation of the lyrical and the geometrical play a central role.

== Concepts and ideals of Lyco art ==
Arguably, Lyco art identifies the meaning of art with its life-serving purpose. Concerning itself with cultural transformation and the human condition, it seeks to expand the boundaries of aesthetics.

Lyco art proposes to create a conscious bridge between the impulsive, intuitional, and planned elements of the creative process, thereby moving along the whole continuum of formative energies. This creative process represents the interaction of emotion and intellect, wherein the passion of logic and the logic of passion are inexorably interwoven through the voyage of aesthetic consciousness. Hartal's poetry was described as balancing "...dreamy emotion and discerning intellect..."

Lycoism combines "geometric elements representing logic, shapeless forms symbolizing the creative process, and warm and cold colors indicating feelings."

In addition, since science and technology impact so much of modern lifestyle during the electronic age, Lycoism views the relationship of art, science, and technology as a pivotal concern. Lycoism refuses to polarize science and art; instead, it seeks to unify aesthetics and ethics in works which involve the use of science and technology by the artist in the creation of beauty.

In accordance with these premises, Hartal formed The Centre for Art, Science and Technology in Montreal during the 1980s. The Centre has implemented a variety of interdisciplinary projects exploring the connections between several branches of arts and sciences, including painting, poetry, music, architecture, communication, artificial intelligence, mathematics, cosmology, and space exploration.

== Early life ==
Hartal relays that as a student in Szeged he participated in the 1956 Hungarian Revolution, and that a few months later he burned all his poems and papers and escaped to freedom.

== Gallery ==
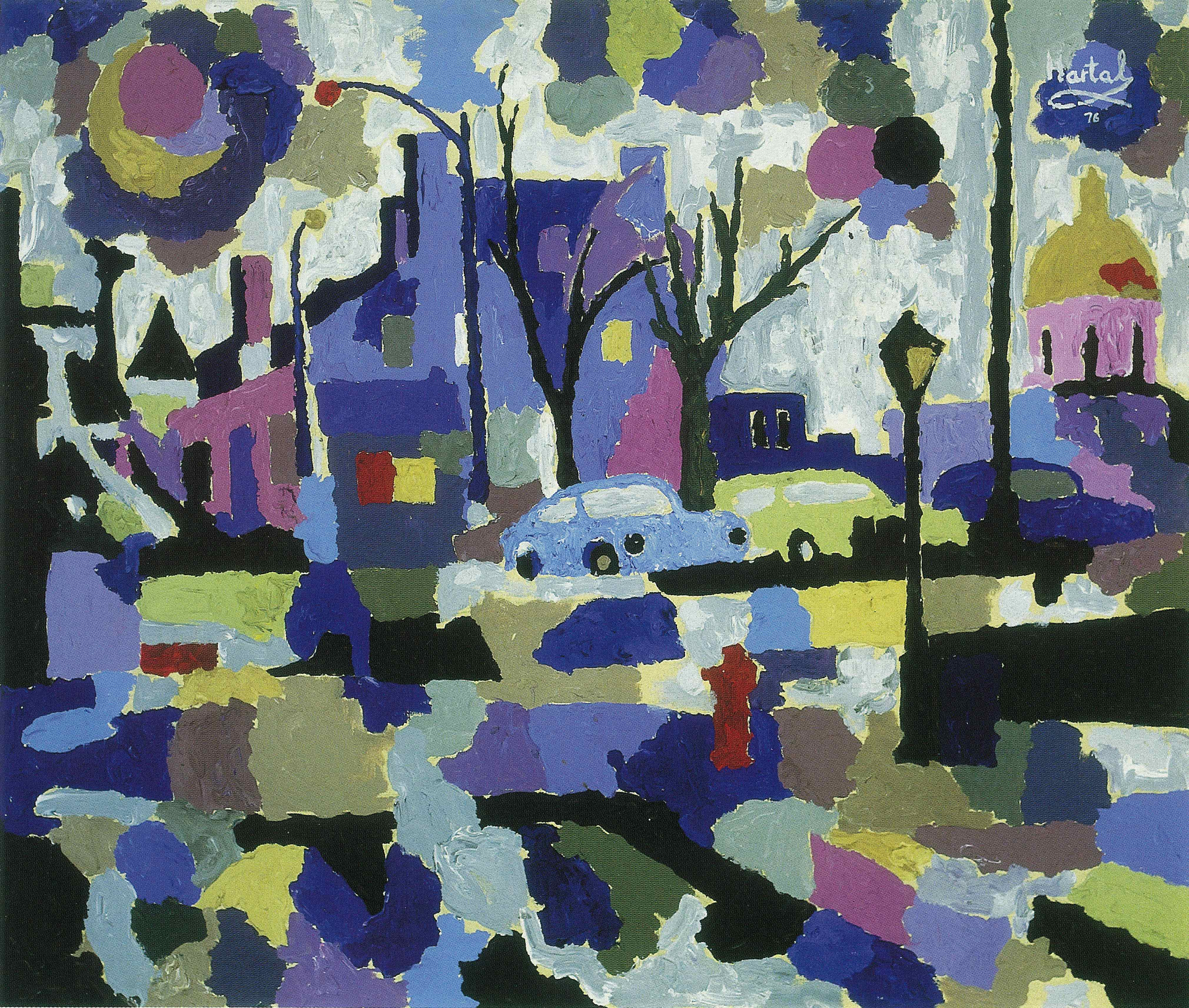
Chateau – Oil on canvas, 76 cm x 92 cm, 1976 Collection: Musee du Chateau Ramezay Museum, Montreal

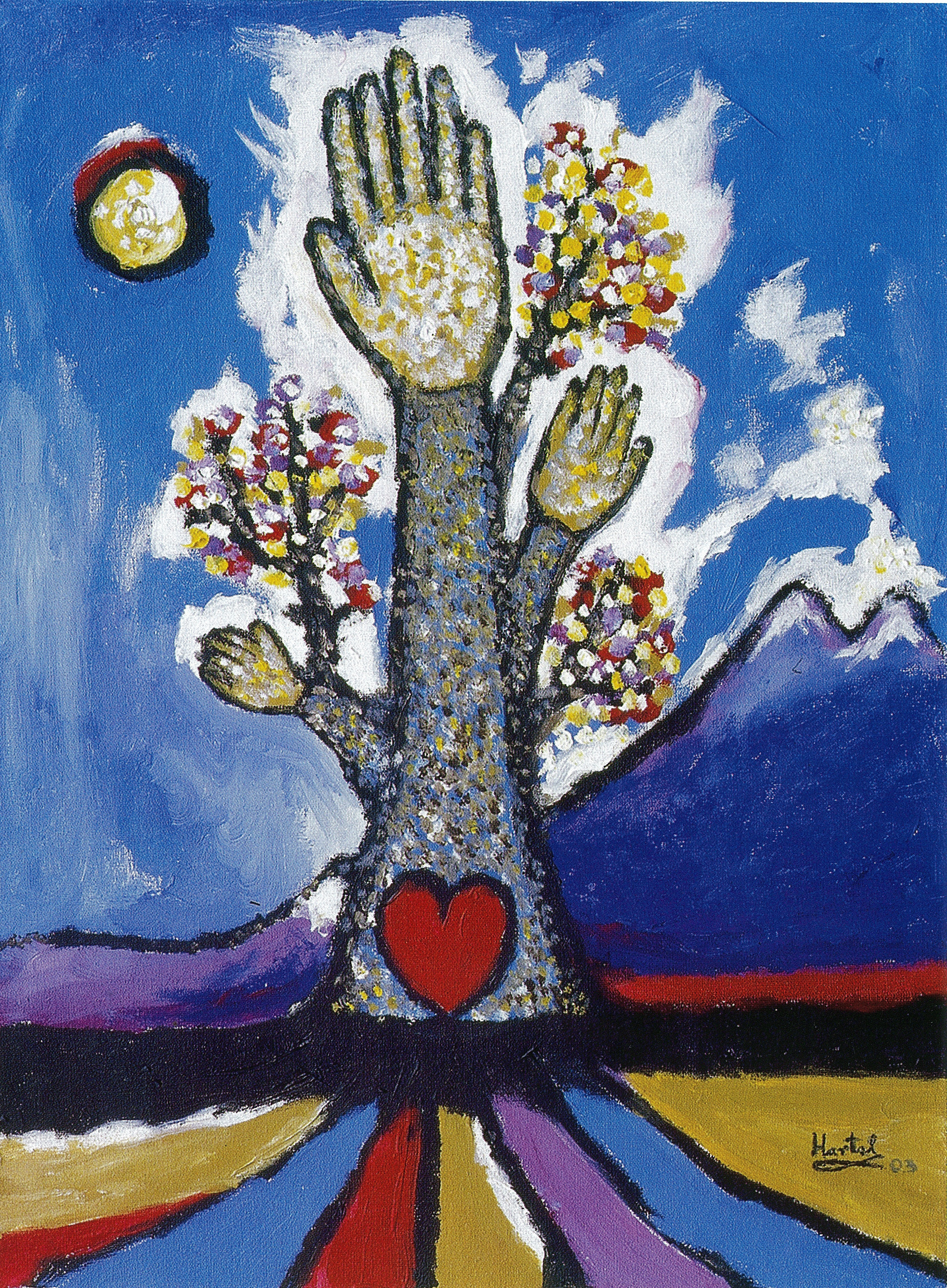
Tree of Life with Six Fingers – Acrylic on canvas, 18" x 24", 2003 Collection of Hanseo University Art Museum, Seoul
