= Jeffrey Scott Holland =

American painter

- Vodkatology, Acrylic on pegboard.
- Born: May 13, 1966 (age 60)
- Known for: Painting
- Movement: Stuckism

Jeffrey Scott Holland (born May 13, 1966) is an artist, writer and musician living both in New York City and in Louisville, Kentucky. He is an active member of the Stuckist and Remodernist art movements, holding a traveling exhibit of Stuckist art in the United States in 2001, and co-curating the Deatrick Gallery, the first Remodernist art gallery worldwide.

Holland cites painters Bernard Buffet and Georges Rouault as influences, and works in a primitive impasto style similar to that of fellow Stuckist, Billy Childish.

In addition to painting, Holland also works in photography, sculpture, graffiti and mixed media.

== Recent solo exhibitions ==
- July 2003: Desperate Telegrams, Gallerie Soleil, Lexington, Kentucky.
- January 2004: Worthless Advice, Cinderblock Gallery, Louisville.
- February 2005: Clowns in Love, Jigsaw Gallery, New York City.
- February 2006: Jefferson County Confidential, Deatrick Gallery, Louisville.
- April 2006: Project Egg, installation of art-filled easter eggs, Chicago, Atlanta, Cincinnati, St. Louis, Nashville, and Indianapolis.
- June 2006: Appalachian Voodoo, Black Box Gallery, Seattle.
- June 2006: Outhouse in Flames, Morgan Art Space, Brooklyn.
- April 2007: Fuel to Build a Fire, KISS Coffeehouse, Myrtle Beach, SC
