= Charles Thomson (artist) =

English artist, poet and photographer

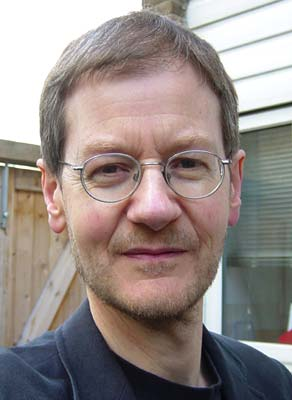
- Charles Thomson
- Born: 6 February 1953 (age 73); Romford, Essex, England
- Education: Maidstone College of Art
- Known for: Painting
- Notable work: Sir Nicholas Serota Makes an Acquisitions Decision
- Movement: Stuckism

Charles Thomson (born 6 February 1953) is an English artist, poet and photographer. In the early 1980s he was a member of The Medway Poets. In 1999 he named and co-founded the Stuckists art movement with Billy Childish. He has curated Stuckist shows, organised demonstrations against the Turner Prize, run an art gallery, stood for parliament and reported Charles Saatchi to the OFT. He is frequently quoted in the media as an opponent of conceptual art. He was briefly married to artist Stella Vine.

== Early life ==
Charles Thomson was born in Romford, Essex, and educated at Brentwood School, Essex, where he was a classmate of Douglas Adams. While still at school, he organised mixed media arts events and contributed to Broadsheet, a magazine edited by Paul Neil Milne Johnstone and published by Artsphere, a school arts group. Outside school, he started the Havering Arts Lab. this resulted in a headline "Sex Orgy Tale—Group Banned" in the local Havering Express newspaper. In 1970 he produced a satirical magazine, called 'Lubricant', which ran for 10 issues. In 1971 he stood (unsuccessfully) as a Dwarf candidate in the Havering council elections, and was involved in anti-pollution protests. He distributed "underground" magazines around London, including "Schoolkids OZ". In 1975 he went to Maidstone College of Art, where he was the only person in ten years to fail the painting degree. 1979–87 he worked part-time as a telephonist and receptionist at Kent County Ophthalmic and Aural Hospital. 1987–99 he was a full-time poet, with work in over 100 anthologies.

== The Medway Poets ==
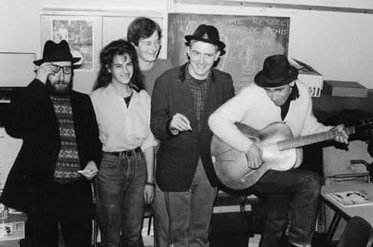
Sexton Ming, Tracey Emin, Charles Thomson, Billy Childish and musician Russell Wilkinson at the Rochester Adult Education Centre 11 December 1987 to record The Medway Poets LP

In 1979, Thomson was a founder member of The Medway Poets, a punk performance group, who read in pubs, as well as the Kent Literature Festival and the 1981 international Cambridge Poetry Festival. There were, however, personality clashes in the group, particularly between Billy Childish and Thomson, who said, "There was friction between us, especially when he started heckling my poetry reading and I threatened to ban him from a forthcoming TV documentary." However, a TV South documentary on the group in 1982 brought them to a wider regional audience. According to Childish: "Me & Charles were at war from 1979 until 1999. He even threatened having bouncers on the doors of Medway poet’s readings to keep me out."

Thomson has said this period was "an incredibly pressured and creative time and established the basis on which we are still working." Other members included future Stuckist artists Bill Lewis and Sexton Ming. Tracey Emin, then a local student, was on the outskirts of the group, being the girlfriend of Billy Childish. In 1987 Thomson printed her first book of writing, Turkish Tales, which had been edited by Lewis and was published by Childish.

== Stuckism ==
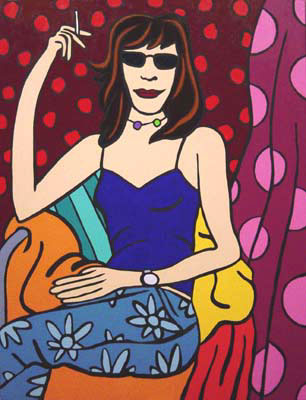
A Long Way from Greece

In 1999 Thomson was reconciled with Childish and together they founded the Stuckists art group with eleven other artists. Thomson coined the name "Stuckism" after an insult from Tracey Emin to ex-boyfriend Childish that he was "stuck", which Childish had recorded in a 1993 poem. The group stated its aims as promoting figurative painting and opposing conceptual art, being particularly critical of the Turner Prize and Charles Saatchi's promotion of Britart. Childish left the group in 2001 and Thomson remained as the figurehead, gaining extensive media coverage for his activities and outspoken views. In the meantime the Stuckists grew to a worldwide movement of over 100 groups in 30 countries.

From 2000 to 2005 he staged yearly Stuckist demonstrations against the Turner Prize (making use of props such as clown costumes and blow-up sex dolls). He stood in the 2001 United Kingdom general election, as a Stuckist candidate against the then-Culture Secretary, Chris Smith. The same year he exhibited the then-unknown artist, Stella Vine (later made famous by Charles Saatchi). The couple married in New York and separated after two months.

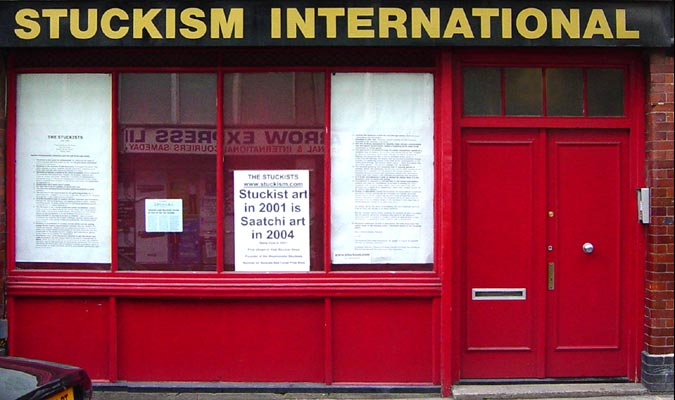
The Stuckism International Gallery, Shoreditch, London

Thomson opened the Stuckism International Gallery in Shoreditch (2002–2005). In 2004 he reported Saatchi to the OFT (Office of Fair Trading) for alleged unfair trading practices in the art world: the complaint was not upheld. He co-curated the Stuckists' first major exhibition in a public gallery, The Stuckists Punk Victorian show at the Walker Art Gallery, for the 2004 Liverpool Biennial. In 2005 he offered of a donation of 175 paintings by Stuckists artists from the Walker Gallery show to the Tate Gallery: this was rejected by the trustees. Later that year he obtained, under the Freedom of Information Act, Tate Gallery minutes about the purchase of a trustee Chris Ofili's work The Upper Room. This led to an ongoing press controversy about the purchase and resulted in an official investigation by the Charity Commission, who censured the Tate in July 2006 for acting outside its legal powers.

In June 2006 he wrote to the British Prime Minister Tony Blair asking him to intervene in the case of Stuckist artist Michael Dickinson, who was facing a possible 3-year jail sentence in Turkey for exhibiting a satirical collage of the Turkish Prime Minister Recep Tayyip Erdoğan.

In October 2006, Thomson exhibited paintings and presented an academic paper in both the Triumph of Stuckism exhibition and symposium respectively. Both these events were organised by Naive John for the 2006 Liverpool Biennial at the invitation of Professor Colin Fallows, Chair of Contextual Studies at Liverpool School of Art and Design.

He writes a regular arts column for 3:AM Magazine, which carries work by a number of Stuckists, ex-Stuckists and their opponents.

== Stella Vine ==
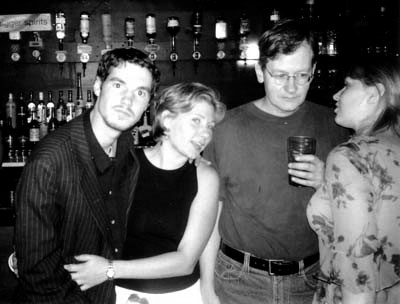
Left to right: Stephen Howarth, friend, Charles Thomson and Stella Vine at the Vote Stuckist show in 2001, where Vine exhibited her work publicly for the first time.

Charles Thomson was briefly married in 2001 to artist Stella Vine. She met Thomson on 30 May 2001 at the private view of the Vote Stuckist show in Brixton, where she accepted his invitation to form The Westminster Stuckists group and to exhibit some of her paintings publicly for the first time in the show. On 10 July, she renamed her group The Unstuckists.

Thomson and Vine had a two-month relationship and they married on 8 August 2001 in New York. The next day, Vine said she wanted a divorce; they had an intense row. She left him and they did not meet again until a week later. Vine said she could not cope with his controlling behaviour. The marriage ended in 2001 after about two months. They were granted a divorce in October 2003.

In February 2004, after Vine "rose to fame after being championed by Charles Saatchi", Thomson said that he was pleased that she had got success, but it was he and the Stuckists, not Saatchi, who had "discovered" Vine. Vine said that Stuckism was a misogynistic cult, that she had quickly realised that the marriage and the Stuckist group were not right for her, and that her marriage to Thomson was "an utter disaster". During the relationship Thomson had paid off Vine's debts of £20,000, and Vine said she married him because this had been a condition of his funding her: "I couldn't face stripping any more and it was too bloody good to turn down." Thomson said that they had a business arrangement to promote themselves as an art couple, there was no condition of marriage, and that she was "really selling herself short" by saying that was her motivation.

In March 2004, Vine said that she had only seen Thomson once, in an art shop, in the previous two years. She later told The Times that it was "impossible to explain" why she married Thomson, that he didn't "give a s*** about art or the Stuckist movement", and that he saw her as a means of gaining his own publicity: "When I met him and he saw some of my history, he saw dollar signs. He is a very exploitative man." In June 2007, Vine said that the marriage was consummated in 2001, a few weeks after the ceremony—"I owed him that"—and Thomson then paid off her debts of £20,000, after which "I've never seen him again."

On 28 March 2004, Thomson reported Saatchi to the Office of Fair Trading (OFT) for alleged breaches of the Competition Act and cited as an example Saatchi's promotion of Vine, a situation which made the row "more bitter". The OFT said they did not "have reasonable grounds to suspect that Charles Saatchi is in a dominant position in any relevant market", which Thomson said was "just another cruel smack in the face" for Saatchi. In September 2004, Vine threatened suicide if her work was included in The Stuckists Punk Victorian show at the Liverpool Biennial, and the owner of the painting withdrew it.

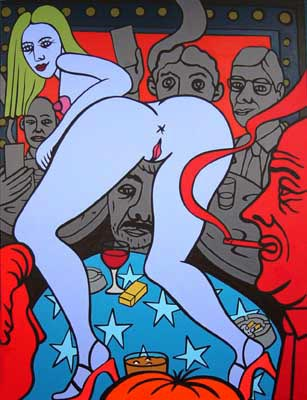
Strip Club

In October 2006, The Stuckists held a group show, Go West, at Spectrum London gallery, including two of Thomson's paintings, Stripper and Strip Club, which depicted "explicit images of his ex-wife." Thomson said the works would make Vine "pissed off", but that she had painted images that were far more upsetting for people, that he would prefer her to enjoy them as he did her art and that they were painted as a catharsis not as an attack. Vine said she had no comment.

In July 2007, at the same time as the opening of Vine's major solo show at Modern Art Oxford, Thomson, furious at Vine's refusal to acknowledge her debt to the Stuckists, held a rival Stuckist show at the A Gallery in Wimbledon, I Won't Have Sex with You as Long as We're Married, which Vine apparently said to him on their wedding night.

In September, Thomson wrote in The Jackdaw, criticising the Tate gallery for not having work by a number of figurative painters, among whom he listed Vine, and said she should have been one of that year's Turner Prize nominees for her show at Modern Art Oxford.

== Sir Nicholas Serota Makes an Acquisitions Decision ==
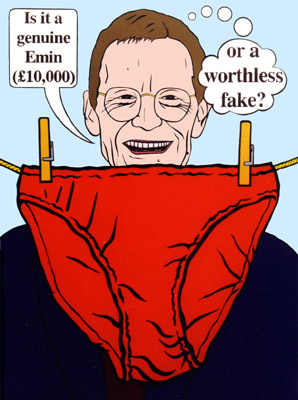
Sir Nicholas Serota Makes an Acquisitions Decision, 2000.

His satirical painting of Sir Nicholas Serota, Sir Nicholas Serota Makes an Acquisitions Decision, has been widely reproduced in the media and become a Stuckist icon. It has been reviewed:

Thomson has painted what must be the masterpiece of Stuckism so far: Sir Nicholas Serota Makes an Acquisitions Decision. Here the slick handling and smartass irony of Britart are turned on its champion to make a very funny point and a rather good portrait. This is an example of what the Situationists called detournement, using your enemies' own weapons against him.

However, Sarah Kent (a staunch advocate of Britart) was less impressed with the satire: "One might forgive his puerile humour if Thomson didn't consider it a serious weapon ... cut the ranting and Thomson could be a reasonable painter."

Thomson pointed out in response, "it's reality. A few weeks after I did the painting, Tracey Emin was shown on TV getting very angry about an installation because someone had substituted another pair of knickers for hers ... That makes it a bit sad."

In October 2006, Thomson's painting of Serota was exhibited during the Stuckists' Go West show at Spectrum London gallery in London. It was suggested that this could be seen as revenge for the Tate's rejection of a Stuckist donation of 175 paintings the previous year.

== Art technique ==
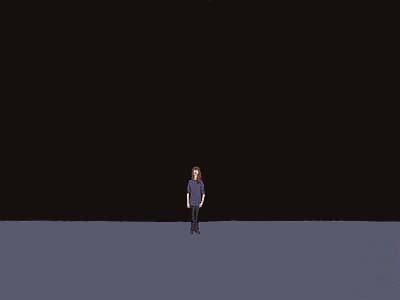
I Feel Bad When I Reject Your Love

Thomson typically paints figuratively with black outlines and areas of flat colour, often brightly coloured. The painting, I Feel Bad When I Reject Your Love is not typical in this respect. He said:

Based on something a (now ex) girlfriend said to me. I thought it was a negative picture, but then I realised it was positive because it’s a reconciliation after self-knowledge. It’s also ambiguous as to who’s speaking. Most of my paintings are based on experiences with people I know, usually on a drawing from life, but in this case from a photo I took of her.

The paintings are based on spontaneous line drawings with a black wax crayon in a sketchbook. These are enlarged on the canvas. The colour is usually the first one on the canvas, though mixing it can take up to an hour. He likens colour to feeling and concludes, "The final image is a synthesis of material, emotional and spiritual experience."

== Gallery ==
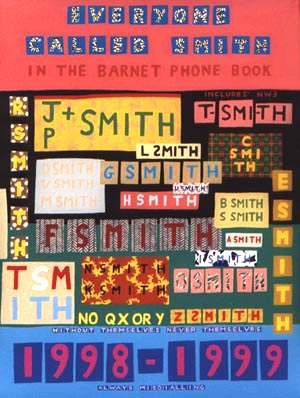
Everyone Called Smith in the Barnet Phone Book 1998–1999

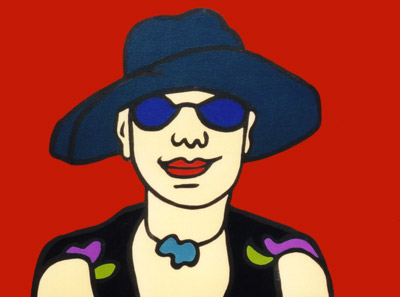
Woman in New York (Stella Vine Honeymoon 2001)

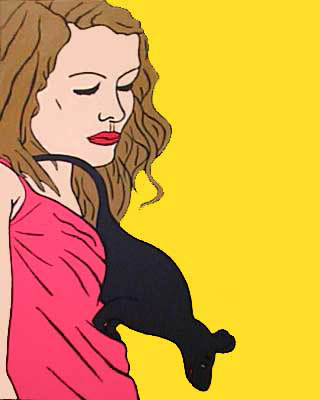
A Single Woman in London is Never More than Six Inches Away from the Nearest Rat

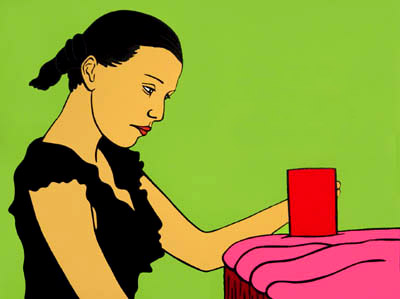
Oxana

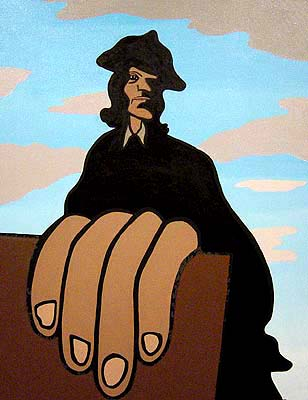
Salvator Rosa (after Salvator Rosa)

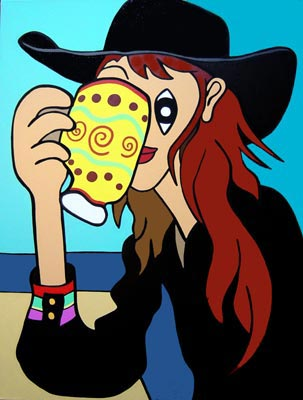
Woman in Black Hat with Yellow Mug

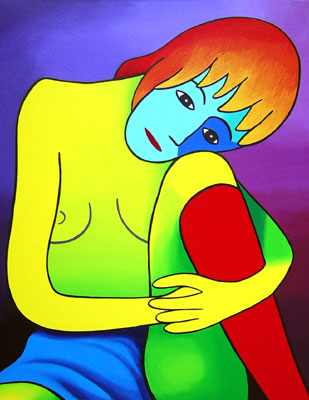
Woman with a Turquoise Face

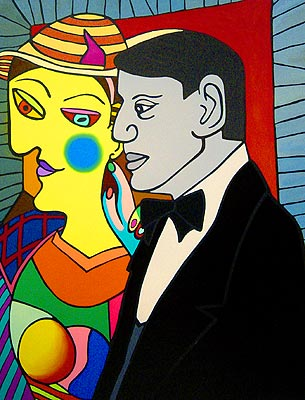
Artist and Model (after Picasso)

== See also ==
- Stuckism
- Remodernism
- Stuckism International Gallery
