= Darwin J. Flakoll =

American Hispanist and writer (1923–1995)

- Born: February 20, 1923; Wendte, South Dakota, US
- Died: April 15, 1995 (aged 72); Managua, Nicaragua
- Other name: Bud J. Flakoll
- Education: San Diego State University; George Washington University
- Occupations: Journalist, writer, translator
- Years active: 1948–1995
- Spouse: Claribel Alegría

Darwin J. Flakoll (February 20, 1923 – April 15, 1995), also known as Bud J. Flakoll, was an American Hispanist, journalist, writer, and translator. He is best known for his collaborations with his wife, the Nicaraguan-Salvadoran poet Claribel Alegría.

== Early life ==
Flakoll was born in Wendte, South Dakota on February 20, 1923. His parents were Alma (née Austin) and Arthur Andrew Flakoll. They were of Norwegian descent and ran a small rural school in South Dakota. In the Dakotas, Flakoll befriended Sitting Bull 's grandson; this relationship helped Flakoll to write from an Indigenous perspective later in life.

When he was four years old, he was an avid reader and had a special interest in science. The South Dakota Department of Education tested Flakoll when he was six years old, determining that he had the vocabulary of a college student. When he was nine years old, a test revealed that he had an IQ of 140, placing him higher than the top one percent of the U.S. population.

During the Great Depression in 1933, his family moved to San Diego, California. In 1935, he graduated from Horace Mann Junior High. When he was nineteen years old, Flakoll graduated from San Diego State University. While there, he was a member of Alpha Phi Omega.

Flakoll worked as a journalist after college. He enlisted in the United States Navy during World War II, serving on destroyers in the Atlantic and Pacific theaters. After the war, Flakoll enrolled at George Washington University to pursue a master's degree in history. While there, he met the Nicaraguan-Salvadoran poet Claribel Alegría in 1946; they developed a personal and literary relationship.

== Career ==
Flakoll was the Washington correspondent for the Albuquerque Journal in 1948. In 1949, he had the same position with the The Tacoma News Tribune. In September 1949, he was also working for the Santa Barbara News-Press, followed by the The Daily Report, The Times-News, and The Weiser American in 1950. In 1953, Flakoll and his wife move to Chile to work on a compilation of Latin American writers, with funding from the Catherwood Foundation.

From 1956 to 1959, he returned to Washington, D.C. to train for work in the foreign service. He was then posted in Montevideo, Uruguay. In 1960, he was transferred to Argentina. He resigned form the foreign service in 1962 and returned to journalism. He then moved to Paris, France, with his family for several years. In 1966, they moved to Majorca, Spain, to focus on writing full-time.

Flakoll and Alegria collaborated on numerous projects. They translated the Latin American Boom anthology New Voices of Hispanic America, published by Beacon Press in 1962, which introduced the English-speaking public to authors such as Mario Benedetti, Julio Cortázar, and Mario Vargas Llosa. In 1966, they published Cenizas de Izalco (Ashes of Izalco), which denounced the Salvadoran massacre for the first time; it was also a finalist for the Premio Biblioteca Breve. In 1979, the lived in Ni Nicaragua for six months to conduct research on Sandinista revolution for Death of Somoza, about the last days of dictator Anastasio Somoza García. They then co-wrote Tunnel to Canto Grande: The Story of the Most Daring Prison Escape in Latin American History; On the Front Line: Guerrilla Poems of El Salvador; and numerous joint translations of poetry. Calling on his experience as a journalist, Flakoll created the structure of the novels and memoirs, while his wife focused on the text.

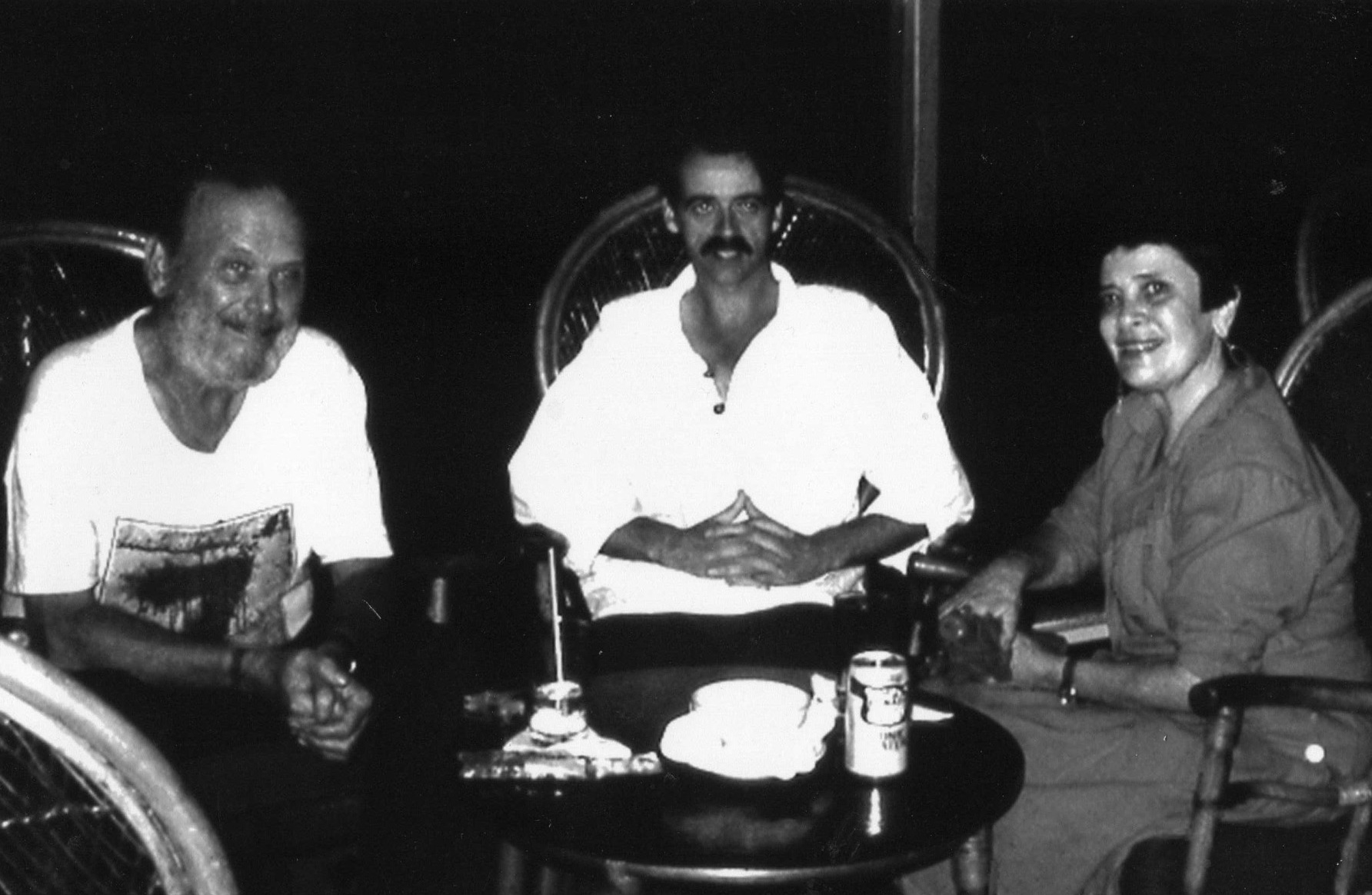
Darwin J Flakoll, Bill Lewis, and Claribel Alegría in Nicaragua, 1989

== Personal life ==
Three months after meeting, Flakoff and Claribel Alegría married on December 29, 1947, at St. Matthew's Church in Washington, D.C. The couple had four children: Maya, Patricia, Karen, and Erik. After time in Washington, D.C, they lived in Paris, Chile, Mexico, Uruguay, Argentina and Majorca, Spain. In Deya, Majorica they purchased Ca'n Blau Vell ("The Old Blue House").

In 1985, the couple moved to Managua, Nicaragua, retaining Ca'n Blau Vell as a vacation home. Flakoll died in Managua, Nicaragua, on April 15, 1995.

== Seected works ==
=== Works with Claribel Alegría ===
- Cenizas de Izalco (Ashes of Izalco). Barcelona: Seix Barral Publishers, 1966.
- La Encrucijada Salvadoreña. Barcelona: CIDOB Publishing House, 1980.
- Nicaragua, la revolución sandinista: una crónica política, 1855-1979. Mexico City: Ediciones Era, 1982.
- No me agarran viva, la mujer salvadoreña en la lucha. Mexico City: Ediciones Era, 1983. ISBN 978-968-411-096-0.
- Para romper el silencio: Resistencia y lucha en las cárceles salvadoreñas. Mexico City: Ediciones Era, 1984.
- Fuga de Canto Grande. San Salvador: UCA Editores, 1993. ISBN 978-84-8405-185-5.
- Somoza, Expediente Cerrado. Managua: El Gato Negro, 1993. ISBN 979-8395948724.
- Tunnel to Canto Grande. Willimantic: Curbstone Press, 1996. ISBN 9781880684344.

=== Editor and translator with Claribel Alegría ===
- New Voices of Hispanic America: An Anthology. Boston, Beacon Press, 1962.
- In the Front Line: Guerrilla Poems of El Salvador. Managua; Editorial Nueva Nicaragua, 1988.
- Blood Pact and Other Stories. Translated by Daniel Balderston and others Willimantic: Curbstone Press, 1997.

=== Translations ===
- Luisa en el país de la realidad/Luisa in Realityland by Claribel Alegrai. Willimantic: Curbstone Press/Talman, 1987.
- Mujer del rio/Woman of the River by Claribel Alegrai. Pittsburgh: University of Pittsburgh Press, 1989.
- Fugues by Claribel Alegría. Willimantic: Curbstone Press, 1993.
- Tunnel to Canto Grande (Fuga de Canto Grande) by Claribel Alegrai. Willimantic: Curbstone Press, 1996. ISBN 9781880684344.
- Umbrales = Thresholds: Poems by Claribel Alegrai. Willimantic: Curbstone Press, 1997.

=== Translations with Claribel Alegría ===
- The Cyclone (Miguel Angel Asturias) by Miguel Ángel Asturias. London: Peter Owen, Ltd., 1967.
- El Hereje (The Heretic) by Morris West. Barcelona: Pomaire, 1969.
- Unstill Life: An Introduction to the Spanish Poetry of Latin America edited by Mario Benedetti. New York: Harcourt, Brace & World, 1969.
- Cien poemas (One Hundred Poems) by Robert Graves. Barcelona: Lúmen, 1982.
- Viva Sandino by Carlos Fonseca. Managua: Vanguardia, 1985.
- Nuestra pequeña región de por aquí: Política de Seguridad de los Estados Unidos (Our Little Region Here: United States Security Policy) by Noam Chomsky. Managua: Nueva Nicaragua, 1989.
