= Bill Lewis =

English painter

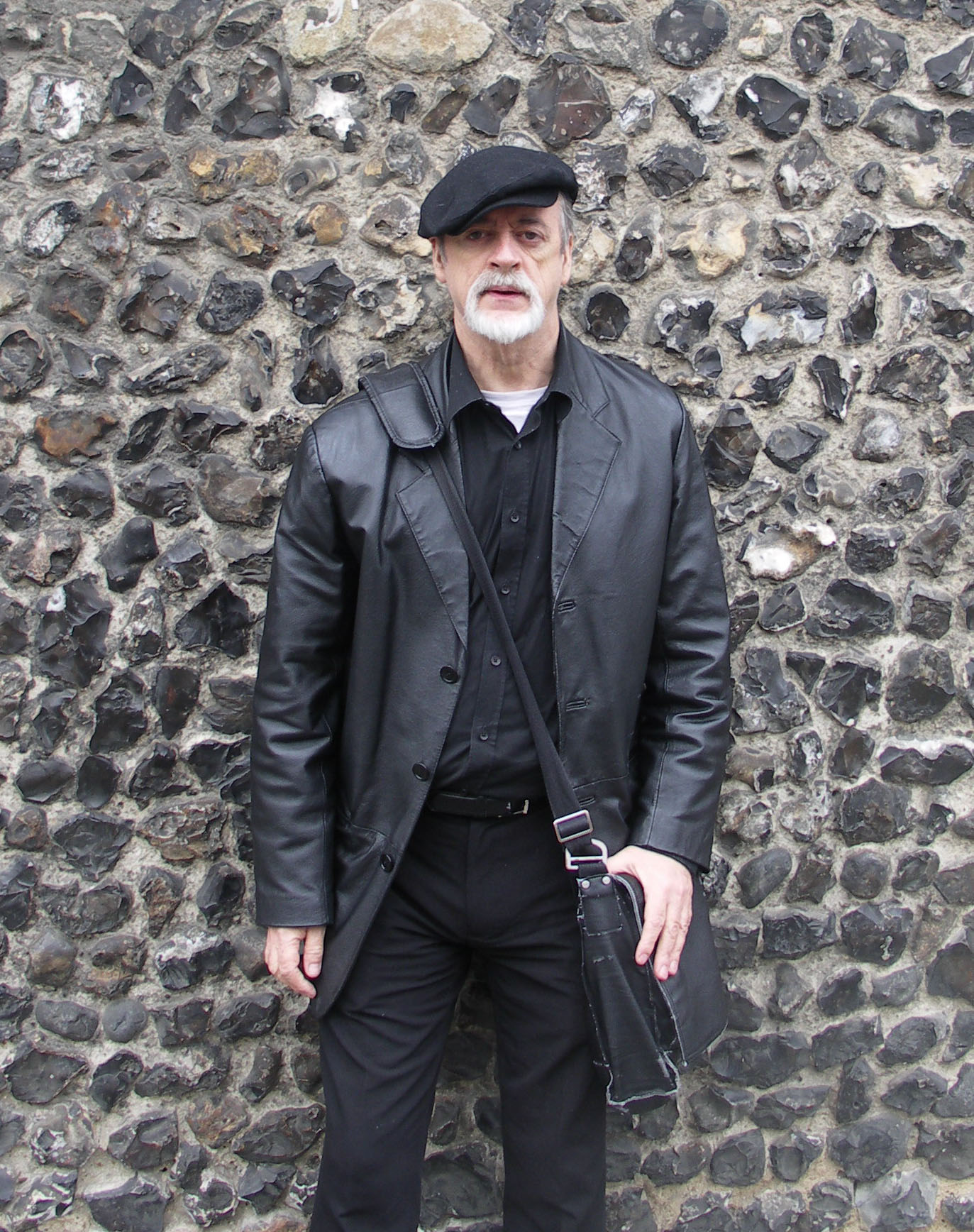
- Lewis in Canterbury, 2013
- Born: William Lewis; 1 August 1953 (age 73); Maidstone, Kent, England
- Known for: Painting, poetry, fiction
- Movement: Stuckism

William Lewis (born 1 August 1953) is an English artist, story-teller, poet and mythographer. He was a founder-member of The Medway Poets and of the Stuckists art group.

== Life and career ==
=== Early life ===
Bill Lewis was born in Maidstone, Kent, England. He attended Westborough Secondary Modern School and left in 1968 with no qualifications. In 1975, with his friend, Rob Earl, he started a series of poetry readings called Outcrowd at the Lamb pub, later renamed Drakes' Crab and Oyster House, by the River Medway in Maidstone. Both Charles Thomson and Billy Childish, the later co-founders of the Stuckists group, read at these events.

=== 1970s ===
From 1968 to 1975 he worked in a warehouse at Pricerite Supermarket.

He spent a year unloading trucks for Cheesman's department store in Maidstone, then in 1976 he had a nervous breakdown, attempted suicide and spent three months in Crossfield psychiatric ward, West Malling. 1977–1978, he studied Foundation Art at Medway College of Art and Design, at the same time as Childish and Thomas von Üricht, another future Stuckist.

In 1979, his interest in Berlin Cabaret, combined with the current punk culture, led him to joining up with Childish, Charles Thomson, Sexton Ming, Rob Earl and Miriam Carney to found the anarchic poetry performance group, The Medway Poets, which he named. The group performed in colleges, pubs and festivals, including the international Cambridge Poetry Festival in 1981. It was the subject of a TV South documentary the following year. In Lewis's performances, he "jumped on a chair, threw his arms wide (at least once hitting his head on the ceiling)."

=== 1980s ===
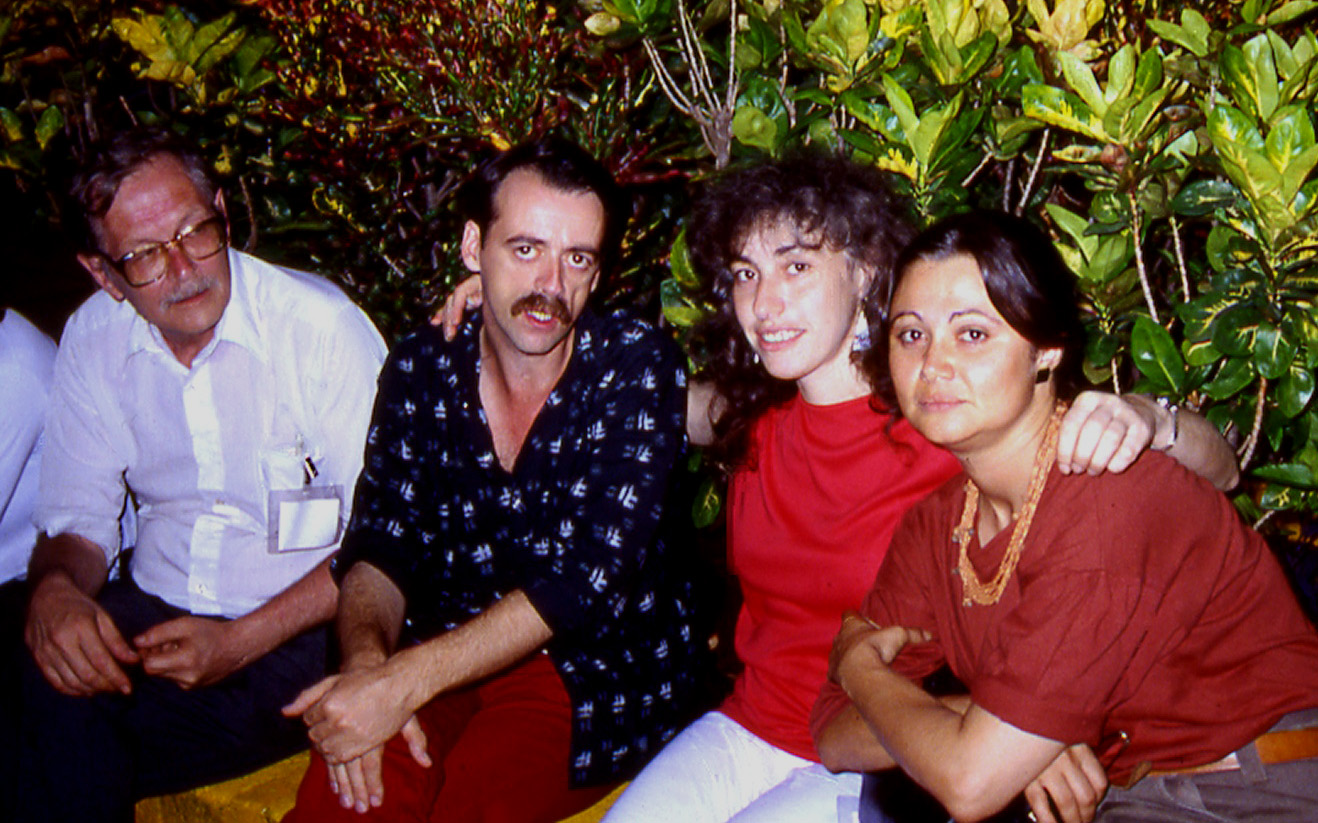
Sandy Taylor, Bill Lewis, Alicia Partnoy and Adriana Angel - Nicaragua 1989

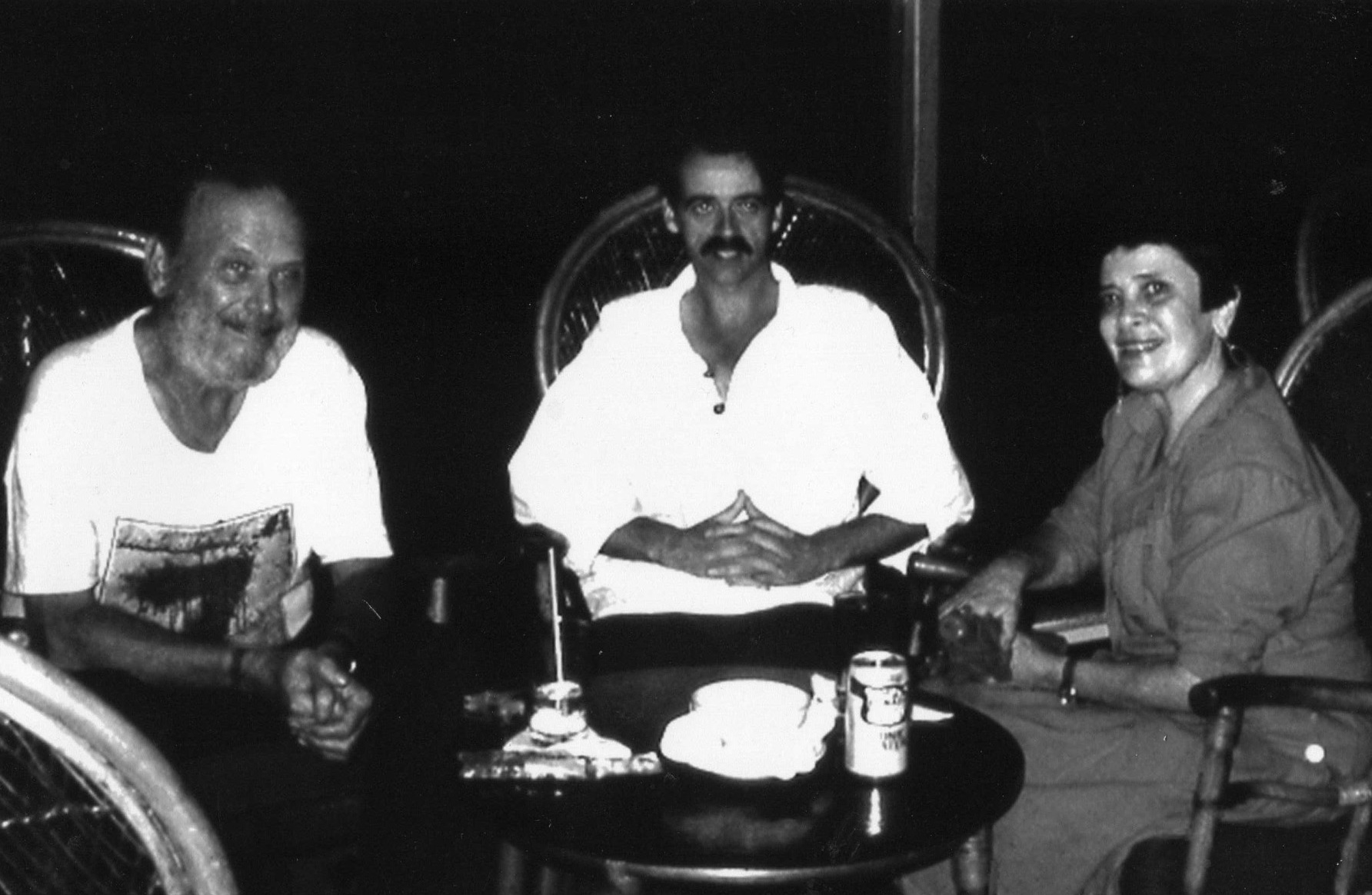
Darwin J Flakoll (Bud), Bill Lewis and Claribel Alegría in Nicaragua, 1989

In 1980, he had a show of paintings at Peter Waite's Rochester Pottery Gallery, as did Thomson, Childish, Sanchia Lewis (no relation) and Sexton Ming, the last two also founder members of the Stuckist group.

1978–82 he was the CSSD Technician at West Kent General Hospital, which provided subject matter for many of his poems at the time. He knew Tracey Emin and helped edit her short stories for her first book, Six Turkish Tales (Hangman books 1987). Since 1982, he has been a full-time artist (though he gave up visual art at this time and concentrated on his writing) with "occasional forays into tomato picking". In 1985, he was appointed as the first writer-in-residence at the Brighton Festival.

During this time he performed at the Kent Literature Festival in Folkestone. His first major collection of poems Rage without Anger was published during this period.

He read and published work on the theme of Human Rights. His poem "Red Guitar" dedicated to the murdered Chilean songwriter Victor Jara, was published in Chilean journals in England and translated into Spanish and published in an underground magazine in Chile.

In 1989 the Nicaraguan poet and storyteller Carlos Rigby invited Lewis to Nicaragua, suggesting he would find the revolution receptive to his poetry. Lewis, with his wife Ann, embarked on a three-month stay in that country. Lewis carried out a series of poetry readings there. Much of his experiences from this journey were later explored in his book The Book of Misplaced but Imperishable Names.

=== 1990s ===
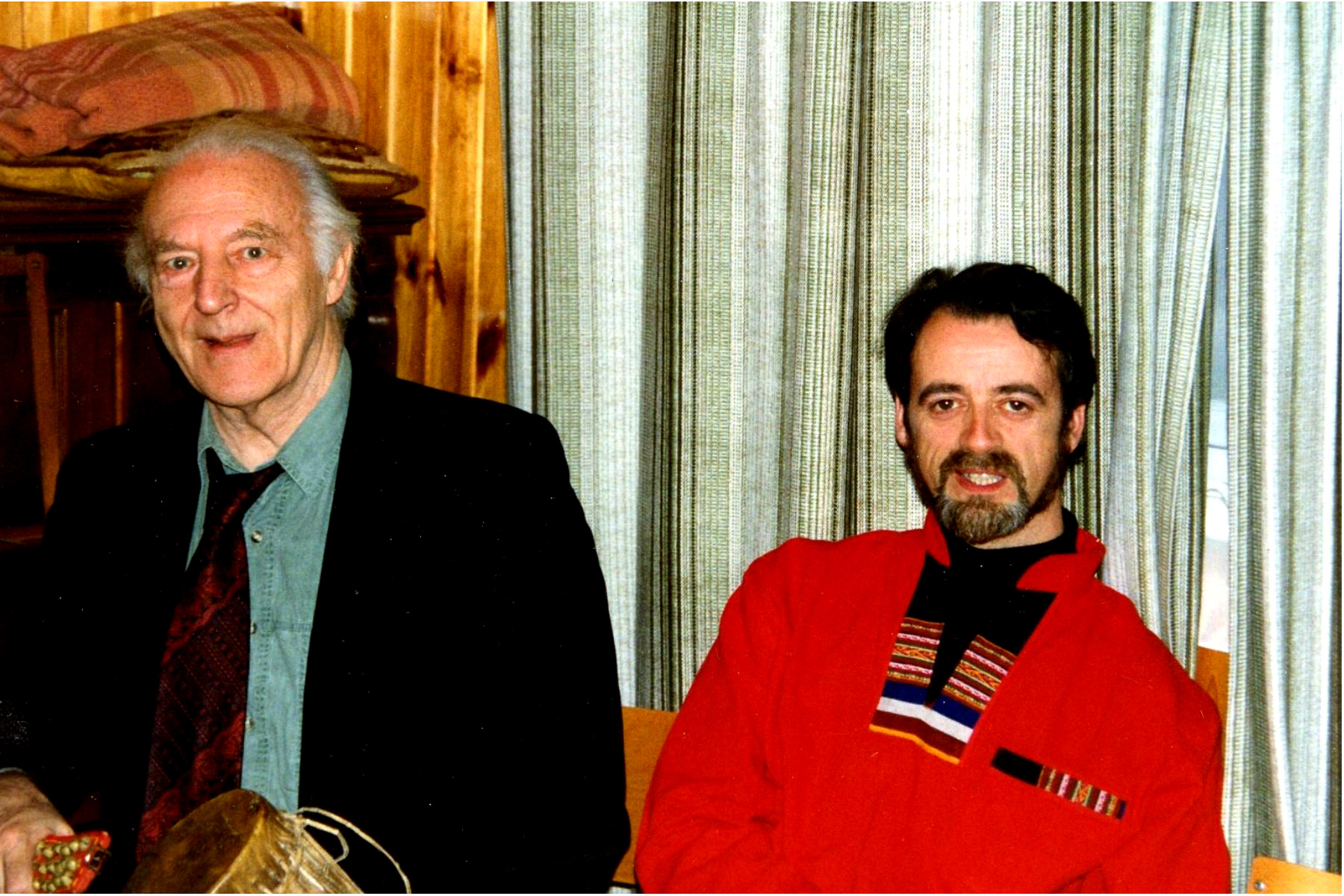
Sydney Carter and Bill Lewis Walderslade 1991

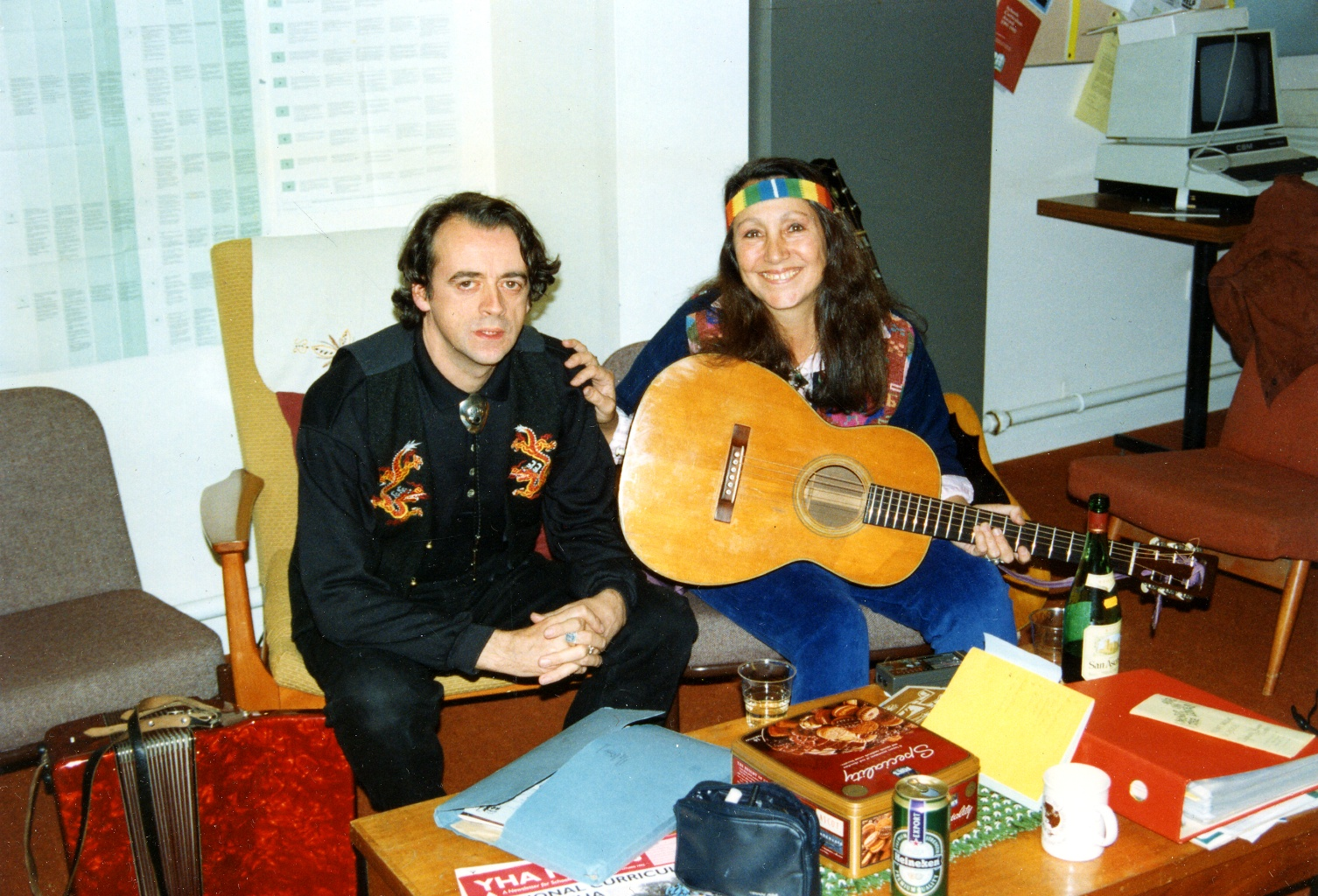
Bill Lewis with Julie Felix backstage before their performance

During this period Bill Lewis performed three times with '60s star Julie Felix.

In 1999 he was one of the founding members of the Stuckist art group along with Childish, Thomson and Ming. Lewis has been featured prominently in all the key Stuckist shows. In 2004, he was one of the fourteen "founder and featured" artists in The Stuckists Punk Victorian held at the Walker Art Gallery for the Liverpool Biennial.

In the 1990s Lewis experimented with singing some of his poems often using a frame drum made for him by an American Indian drum maker and also a Native American horn rattle. His sung poems have influences from shamanic, Latin American and middle Eastern tunes and rhythms.

Throughout the 1990s he carried out many poetry reading tours, six on the East Coast of the United States, he also performed (in English) in Paris, France. Many of Lewis' American readings were organized by Professor Robert Parker Sorlien of the University of Rhode Island. Other readings were funded and organized by The Curbstone Press of Connecticut. The last of these readings was at a festival in Willimantic, Connecticut, where Lewis appeared on stage with Claribel Alegría, Naomi Ayala and Luis J. Rodriguez. During his reading tours of the USA he was asked to lecture on Mythology and Culture to ARIL (Association for Religion in Intellectual Life) at the University of Rhode Island and he gave a guest lecture on the Trickster Archetype to the Social Anthropology Club at the University of Eastern Connecticut which was set up by Dr. Tom Beardsley. He also gave story telling sessions in kindergartens in Rhode Island.

During this period several of his short stories were translated and published in German newspapers and magazines. A few of his poems were also translated into Spanish.

=== 2000s and beyond ===
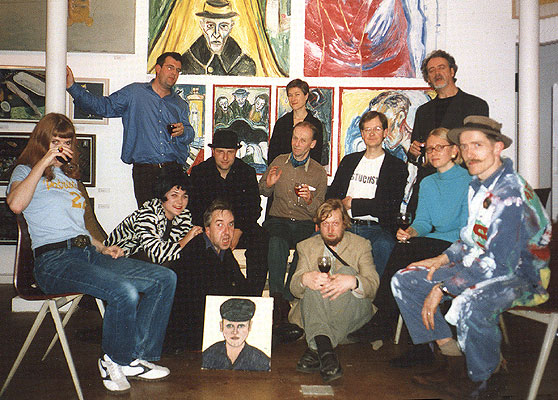
Bill Lewis (standing, right) with the Stuckists group at the Real Turner Prize Show, 2000

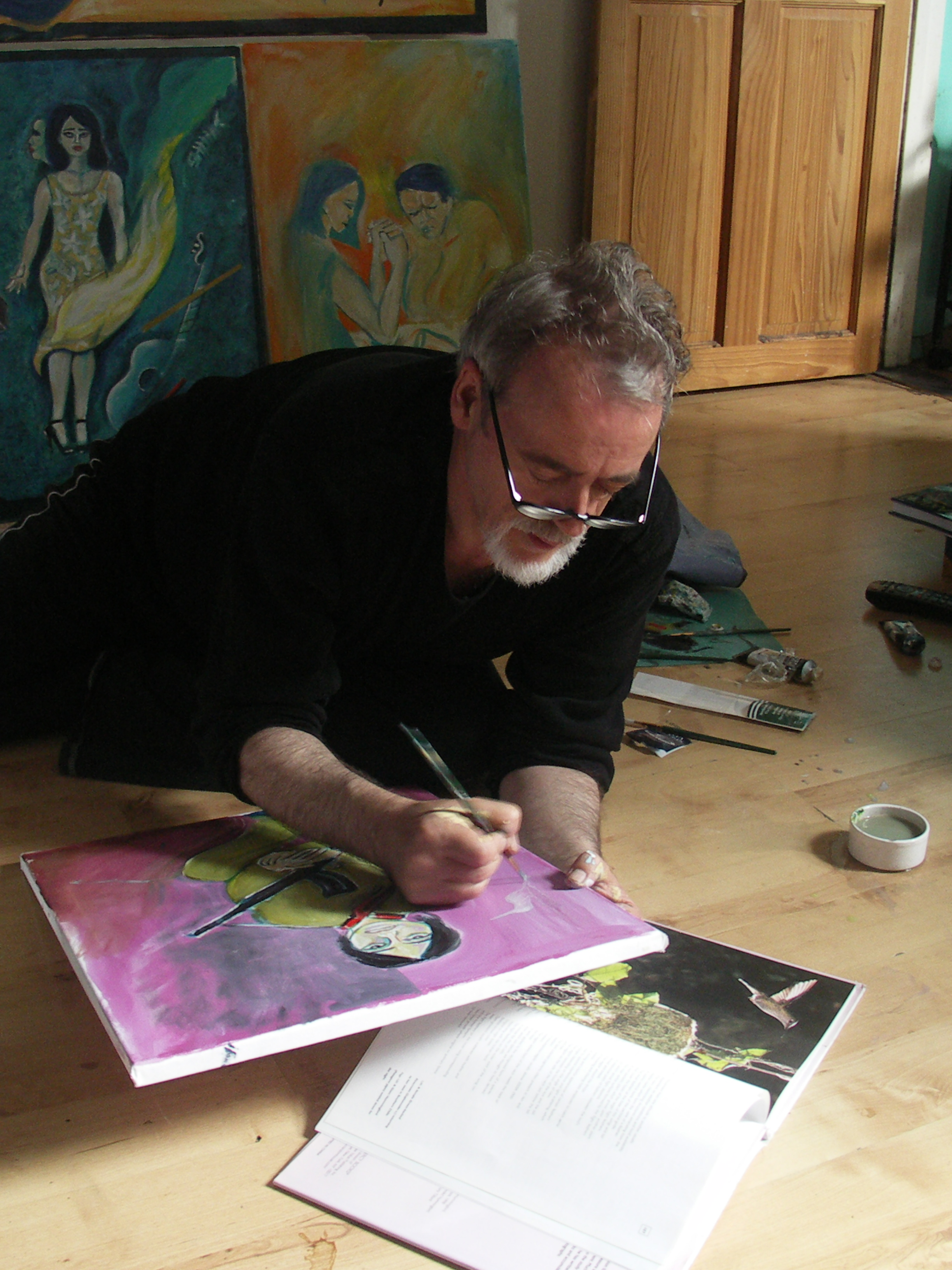
Bill Lewis working in his studio 2011

After co-founding, with Dave Wise, The Urban Fox Press, Lewis went on to found The Medway Delta Press in 2005. The first project was a limited edition set of 3 CDs entitled Voices From The Medway Delta, featuring work by Billy Childish, Sexton Ming, Chris Broderick, Bill Lewis, and other names in the Medway scene. The Medway Delta Press has also published a DVD documentary by Carol Lynn on Stuckism.

He was one of the thirteen "leading Stuckists" in the Go West exhibition at Spectrum London gallery in October 2006.

As the 1990s ended and 2000 started Lewis taught courses in mythology for the Kent Children's University (a Kent County Council initiative). The students were aged between 10 and 11 years old.

At the same time he was teaching courses in Myth and Culture and also Creative Writing for Adult Education in Maidstone and on the Isle of Sheppey. It was during one of these sessions on the Isle of Sheppey that future Stuckist painter Joe Machine joined the course as a student. Lewis recognized Joe's talent and later introduced him to Billy Childish and Charles Thomson.

He had a solo show at the Rochester International Photography Festival.

In 2011 he had his first major solo exhibition at the Deaf Cat Café and Gallery in Rochester, Kent. This was a very successful show with Lewis selling 17 of the 27 pictures.

In the same year Lewis gave a series of lectures on Myth, Culture and the New Paradigm at the University of Creative Arts in Medway Pop-up Gallery. He also exhibited some of his latest paintings in their shows.

In 2012 he was presented with the Literature Award at the Culture and Design Awards for Medway. This was in recognition, not only of his writing, but also his work in the community mentoring younger artists and promoting art and culture in the Medway area.

In 2017 Lewis become a member of COLONY: A Community of Artists. This group of artists work in a variety of mediums and all have a reputation outside of the group. Their aim is not only to exhibit together but also to support and encourage each other. The group was officially launched in October 2018 at the Halpern Gallery, Chatham, Kent.

In 2020 Bill had some of his poems translated into Italian by Silvia Pio and they were published in the online magazine 'Margutte' Read it here:

In 2023 Lewis had a retrospective of his art work entitled Bill Lewis at 70 at The Halpern Gallery in Chatham, Kent.

== Art ==
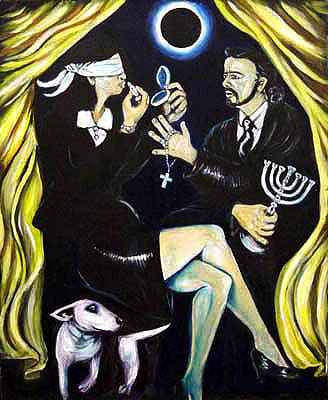
Bill Lewis. God Is an Atheist: She Doesn't Believe in Me.

His position in art in many ways stands for the Stuckist ethic. He has said "I do this because I can’t do anything else and I’ve spent 20 years doing it." He says the importance of his work is not in the technique, but "what's underneath it"; he redraws or repaints an image as many as eighty times, until he is satisfied with it. He names as influences Marc Chagall, Paula Rego, Ana Maria Pacheco, films and comic books. He has been quoted as saying "People are never sure if we are being ironic or not. We are not. We are coming from the heart."

He often uses symbols in his work, frequently imagery from Jewish, Christian and Pagan traditions. A white dog that appears in paintings is a trickster figure that indicates the human shadow; a blindfold woman, applying make-up, is linked to the Shekinah. These symbols are mostly "unconsciously generated" to create "magical realist" paintings. He said of his painting, God Is an Atheist: She Doesn't Believe in Me:

"I had this move through Christianity and Judaism towards something else—I'm not quite sure what yet. The woman represents both my idea of holiness and the feminine part of myself, which is my link to the Great Mystery—that otherness that you sense behind things but you don't know what it is. I used to call it God, but now that seems a very lame word. In old paintings the dog would have represented fidelity, but it could also be an anagram of God or a trickster figure who illuminates the human shadow (the buried part of us). None of these things are separate: they only appear separate. My paintings are like a magic mirror in fairy stories. I hold it up to try to see my true likeness. Sometimes it takes me years to work out what the symbols mean. That's why I do them—to try and find out something."

== Books ==
Lewis has published nine books of poetry and three of short stories; he has made five reading tours in the United States and one in Nicaragua. and has read in Europe. His writing is included in The Green Man (Viking Press), World Fantasy Award winner, as well as The Year's Best Fantasy and Horror, 1997 and 1998.

In 2011 Lewis was published by Greenheart Press and his first book with them 'In The House of Ladders' is a book of poems which also contains six black and white prints by the author. Lewis' second book for Greenheart Press, "In the Long Ago and Eternal Now", was published in January 2017. This also contains black and white pictures by the author and it features several long sequences. Mare Nostrum is a nine part suite of poems that uses the Mediterranean as a metaphor for both the collective and personal unconscious. This sequence has elements of mythology as well as the poet's own personal memories. Another longer piece in the book is called "The Other" and celebrates Otherness in all of its forms e.g. ethnic, gender, duality.

In 2019 the first volume of Lewis' collected poems was published by Colony Press entitled "This Love Like A Rage Without Anger", Poems 1975–2005. This collection contains the first 30 years of his writing including his 'Medway Suite' and poems written in the Americas.

2022 saw the publication of “Sparrowhawk and other poems” published by Colony Press which contained all the poems since the Greenheart Press publications.

In March 2025 Goat Star Books published the first bilingual (Spanish/English) book of Bill’s poems entitled “The Shaman Poet/El Poeta Chamán” which was launched with a poetry reading tour of six cities in Spain with Bill and his translator Rafael Peñas Cruz. The English launch was at The Rainham Poetry Festival (Kent).

== Gallery ==
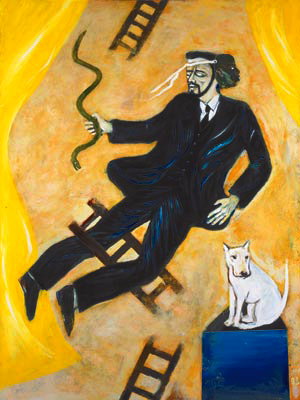
The Laughter of Small White Dogs

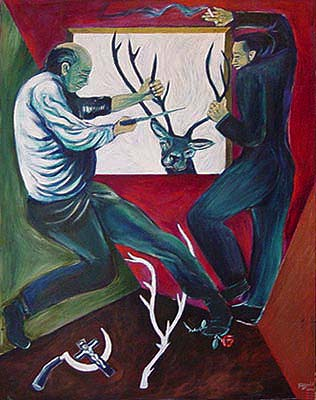
Friday

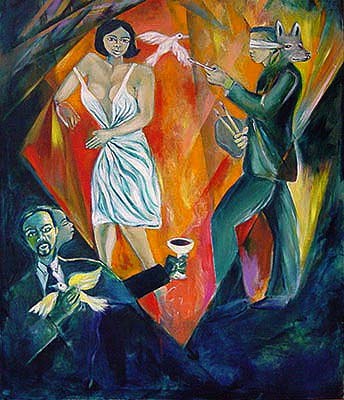
Holy Spirited

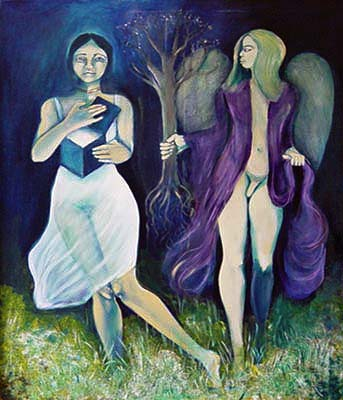
Light Bringers

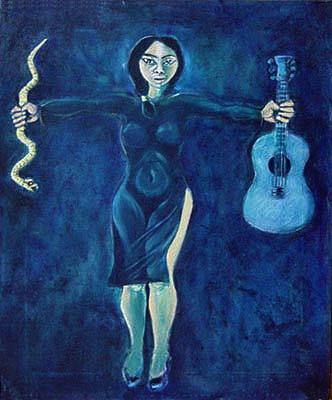
Guitar Woman Snake

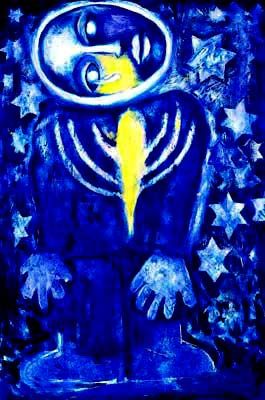
Sleeper of Prague

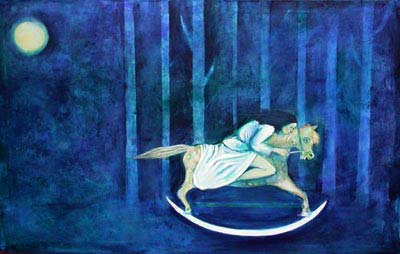
Night Ride

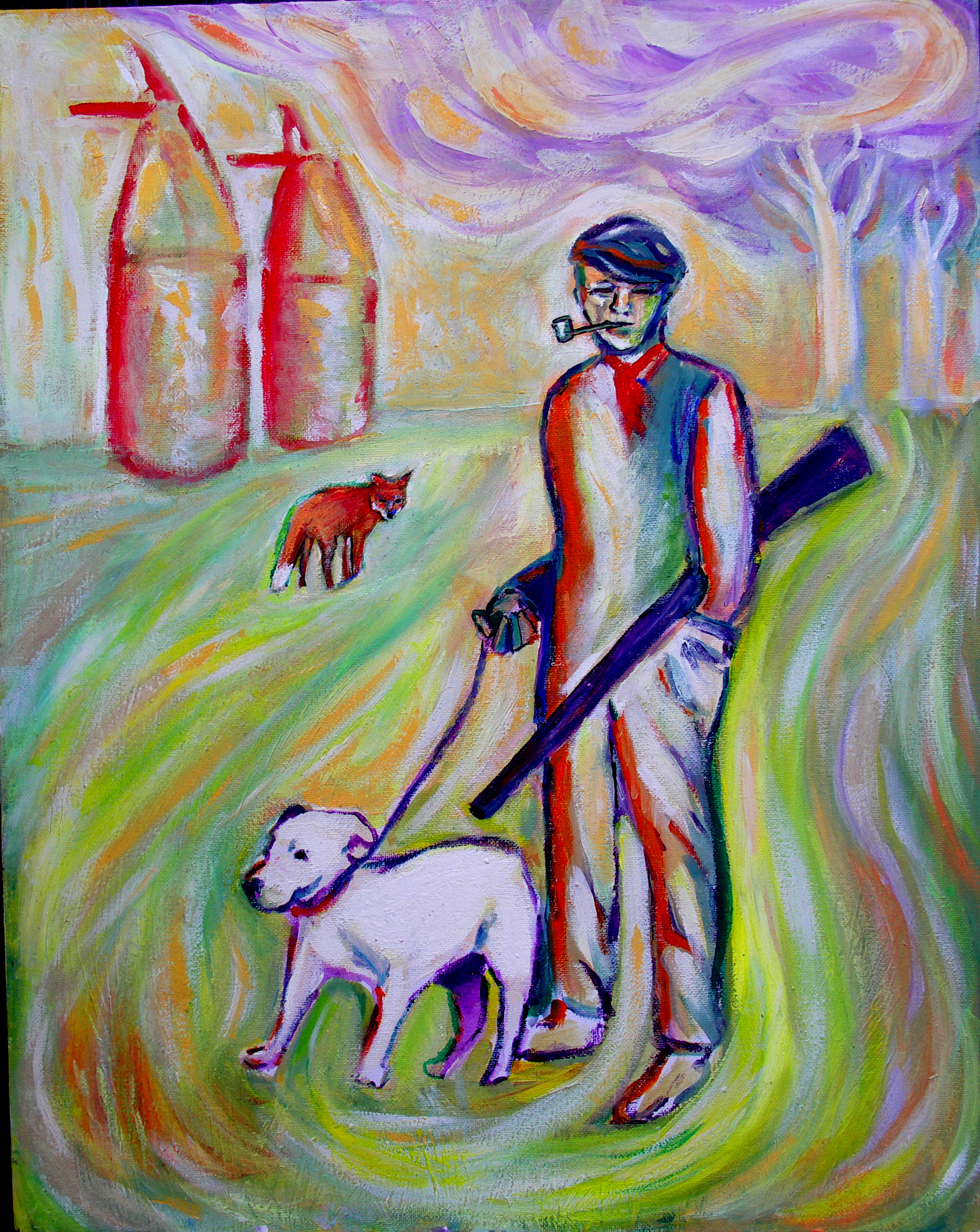
Summer Ghosts

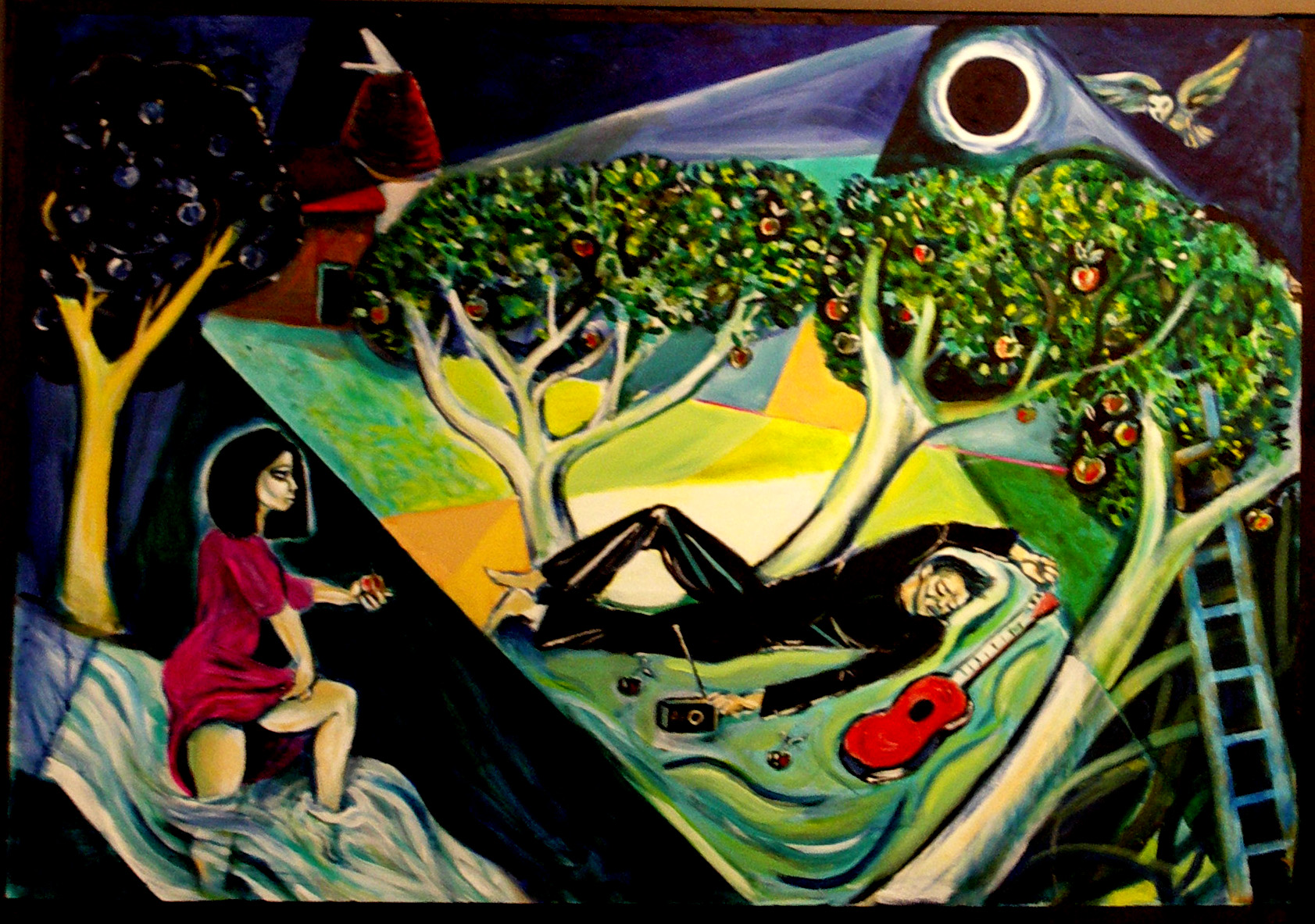
The Dream in the Orchard

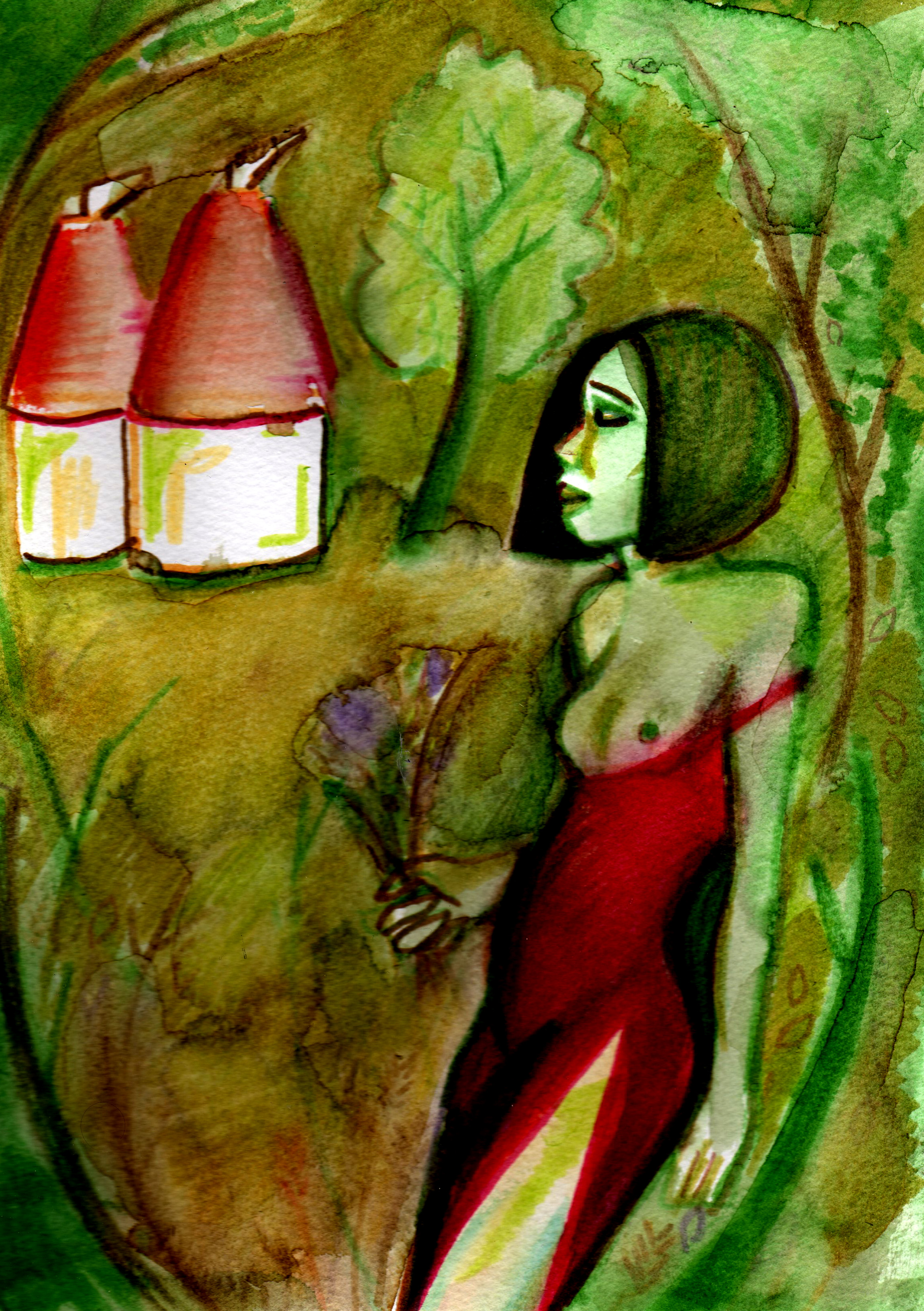
Kent

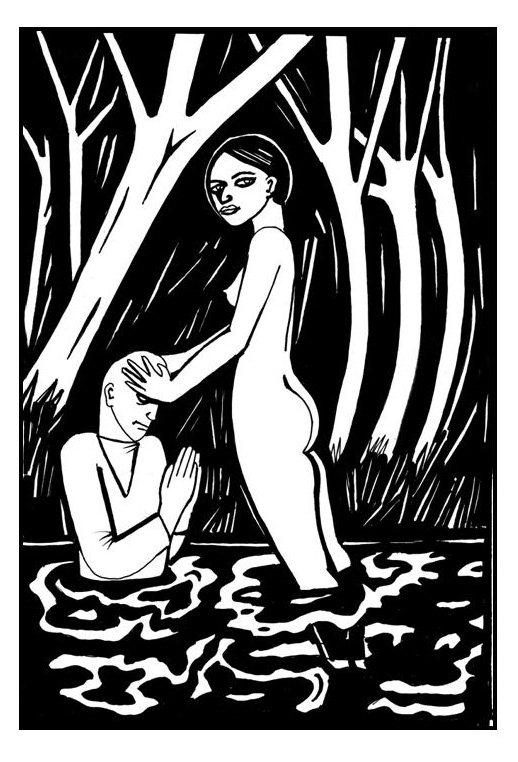
Rusalka

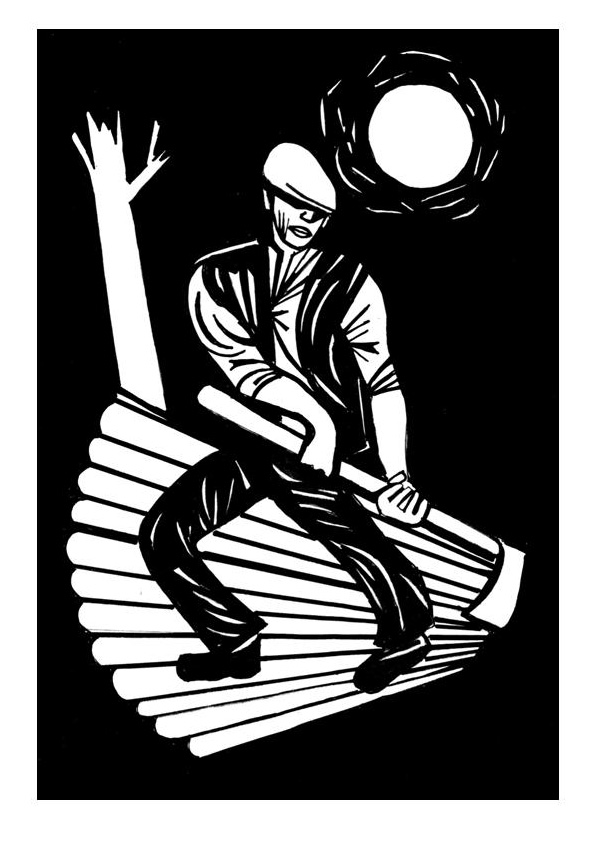
The Field

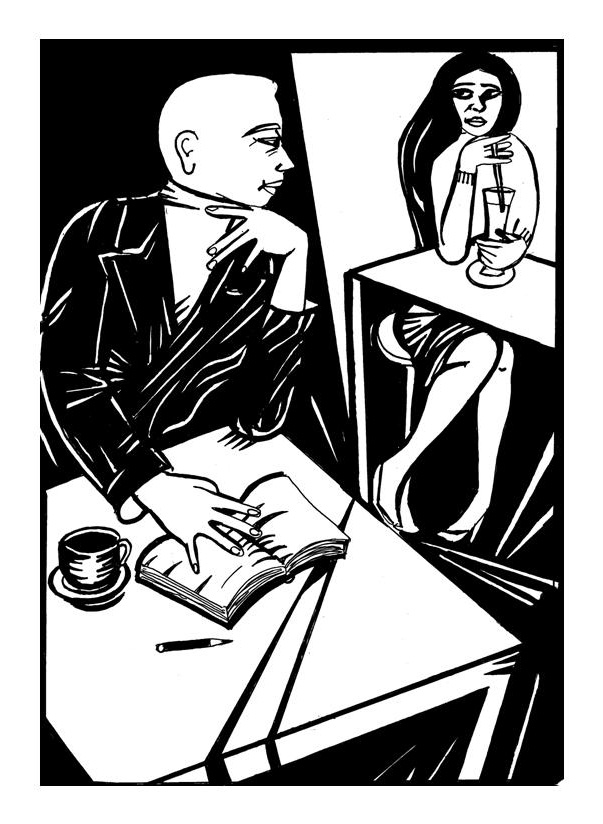
He Watches Me From The Corner But What Is He Thinking

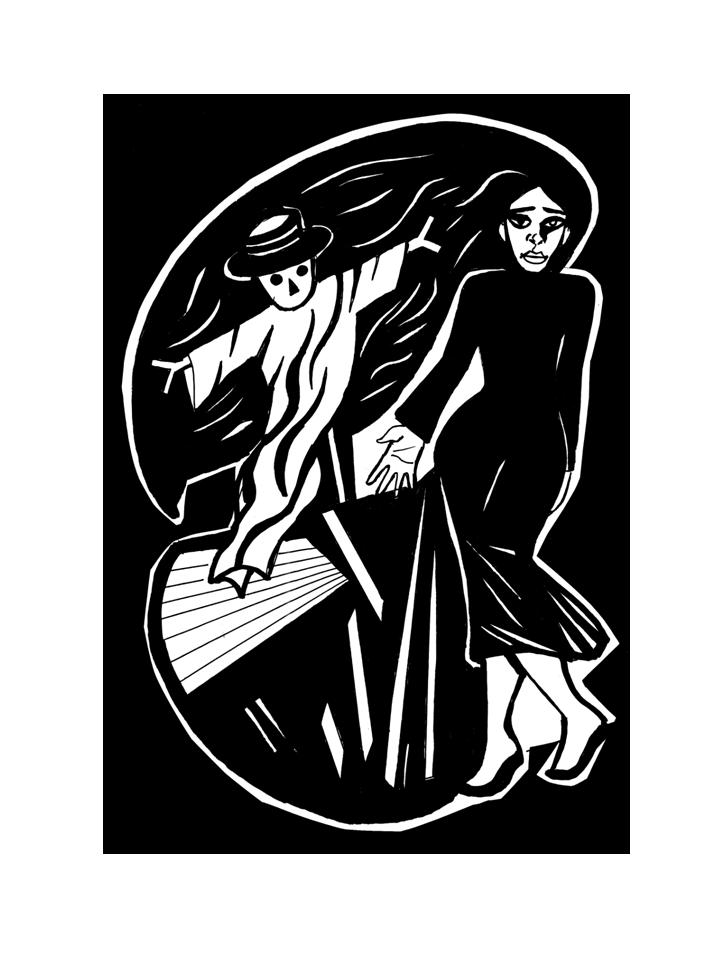
Witched

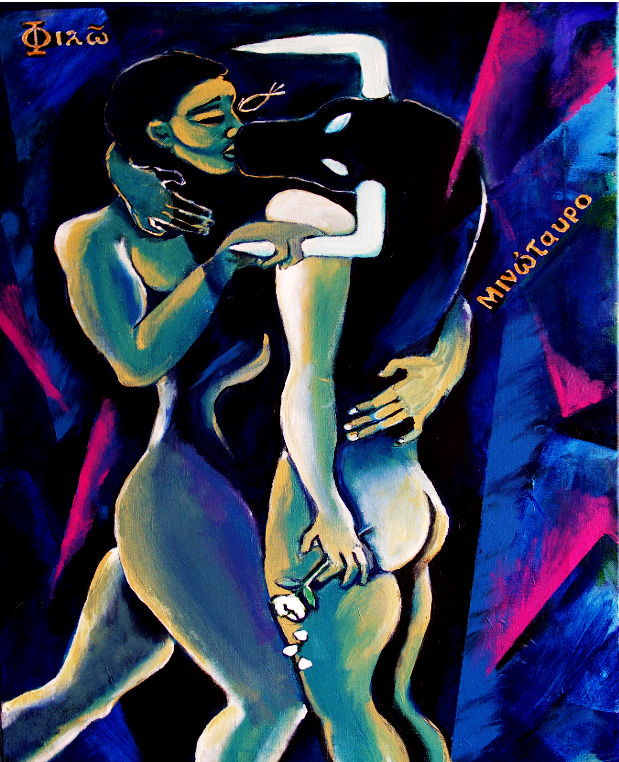
Kissing the Minotaur

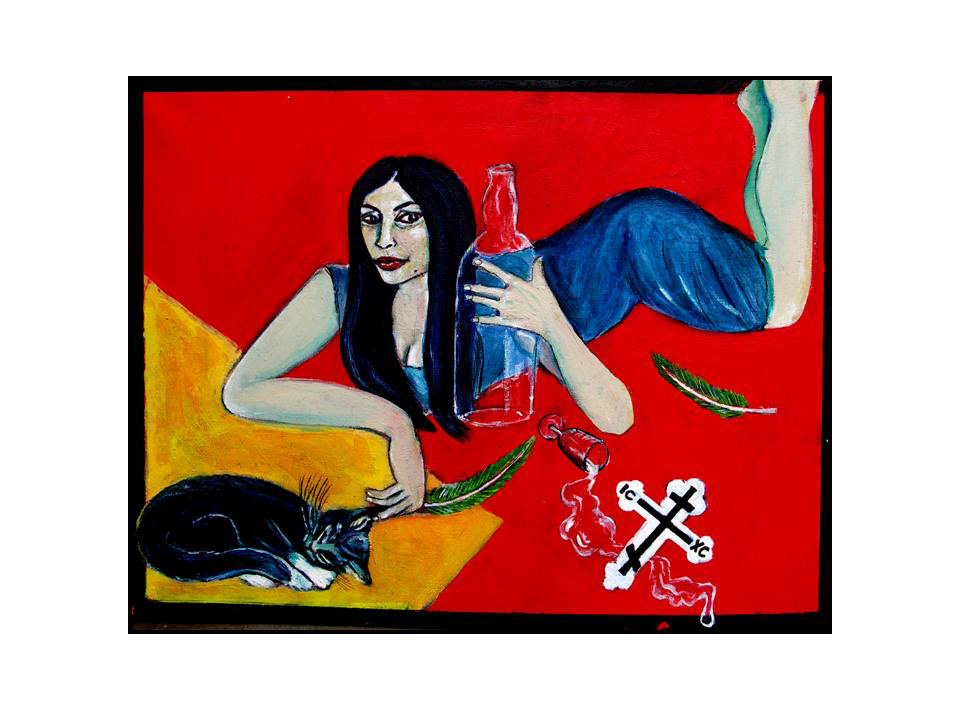
Nune, Vodka and the Cat

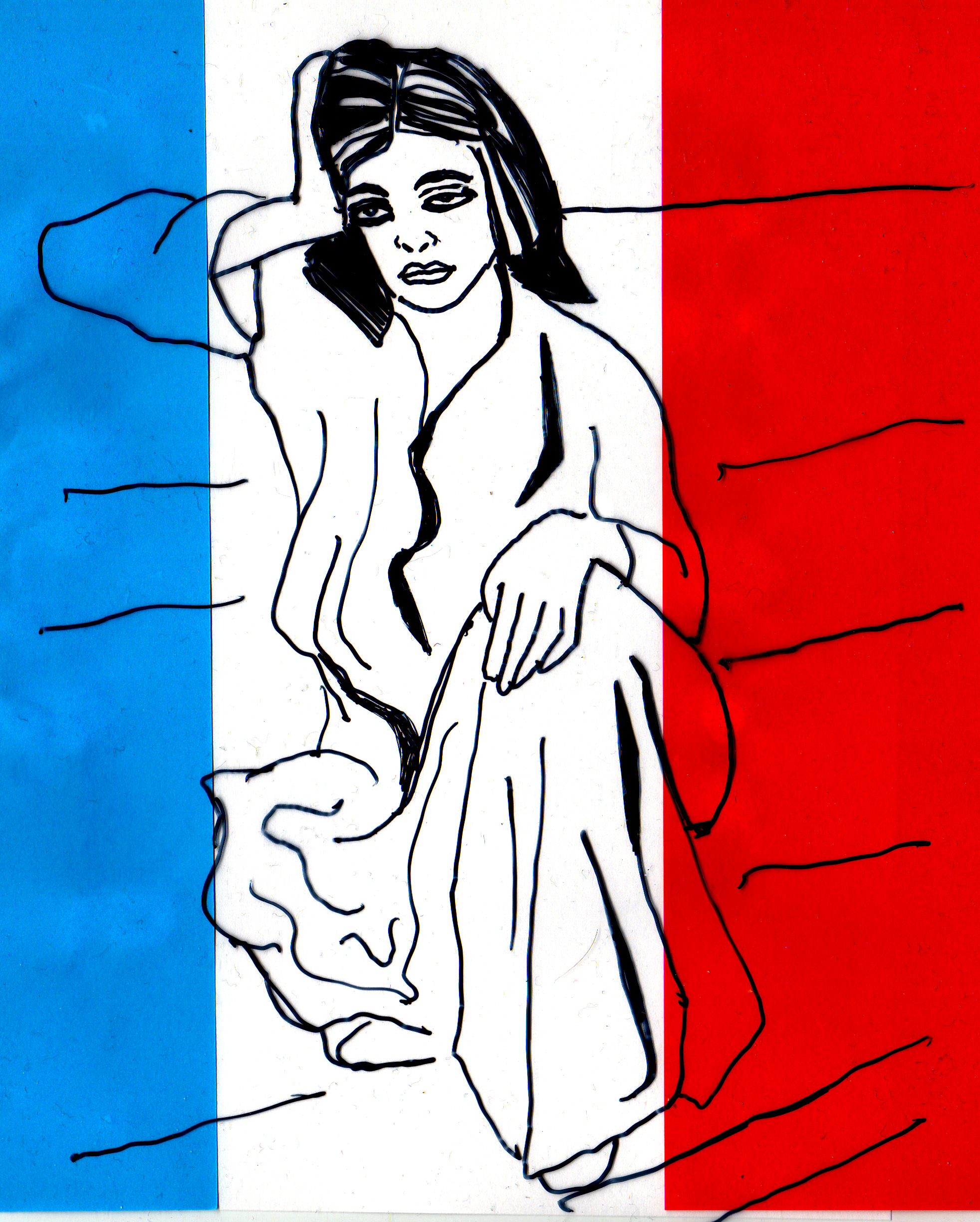
Tricolor (North African Woman)

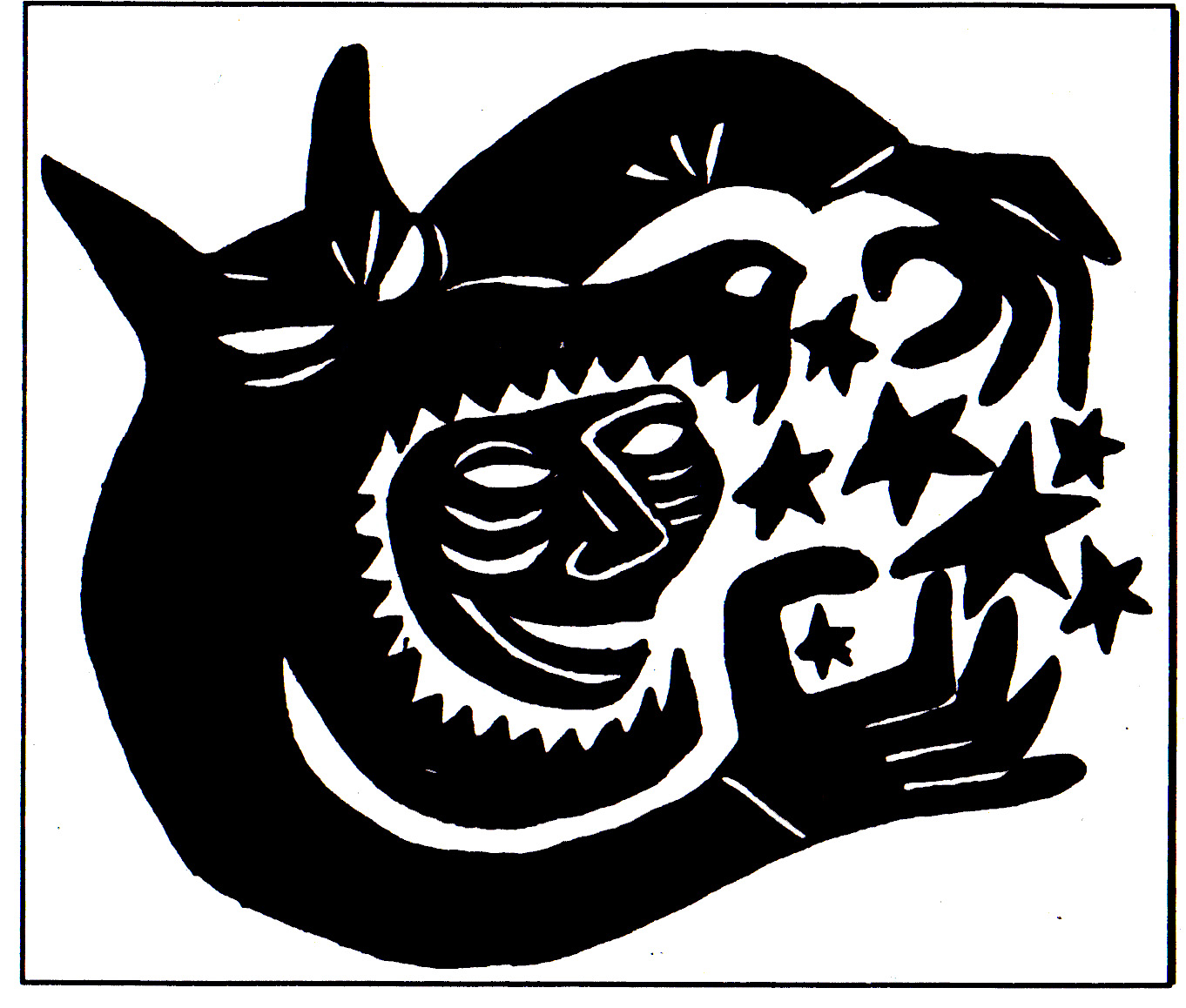
Trickster

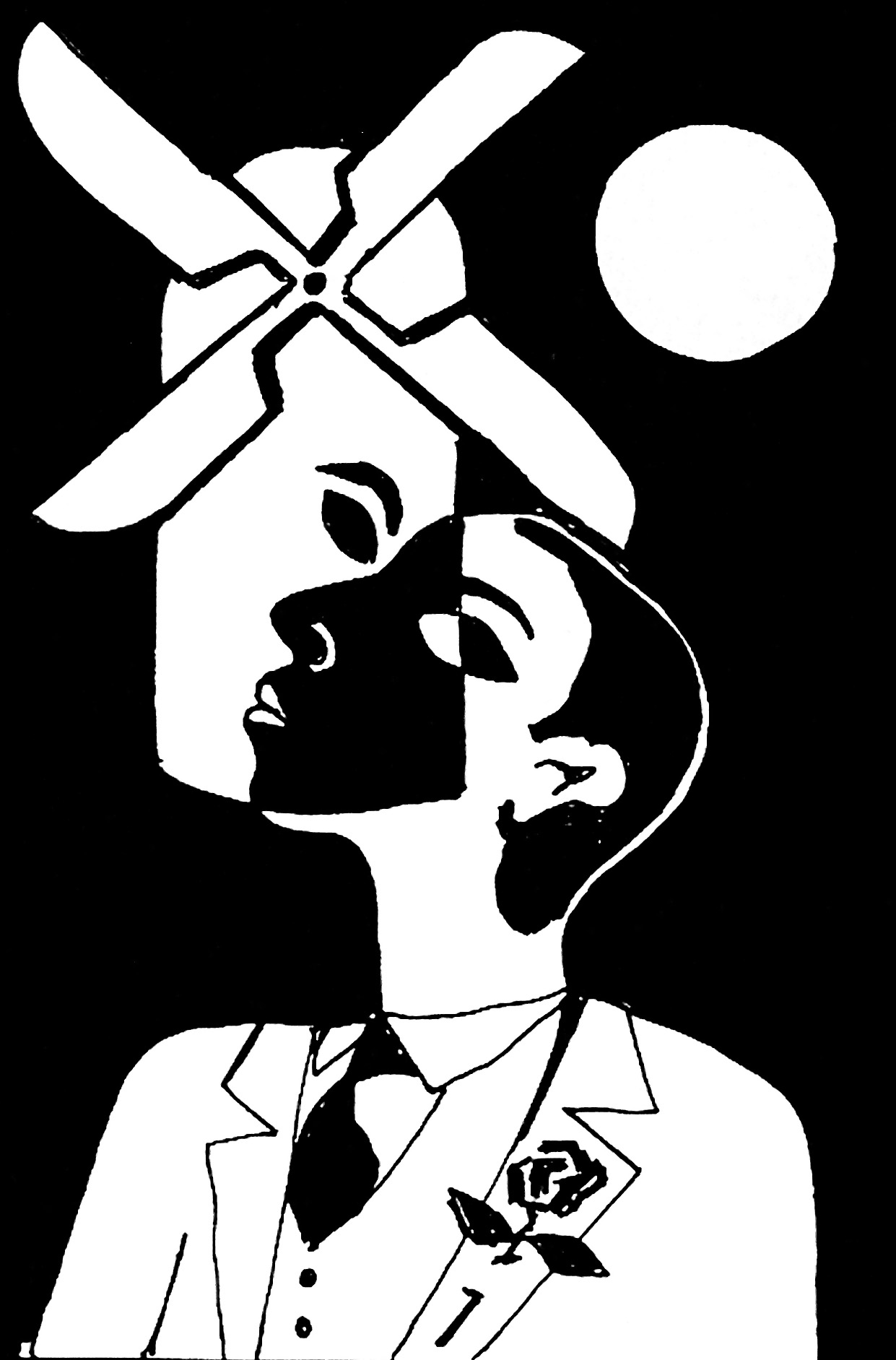
The Gypsy and the Moon

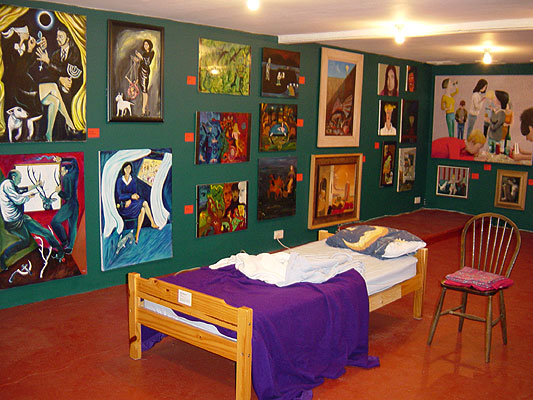
Lewis's work (4 paintings on the left) in The Stuckists Summer Show, Stuckism International Gallery, 2003.

== See also ==
- Medway scene
