= Kathy Page =

British-Canadian writer (born 1958)

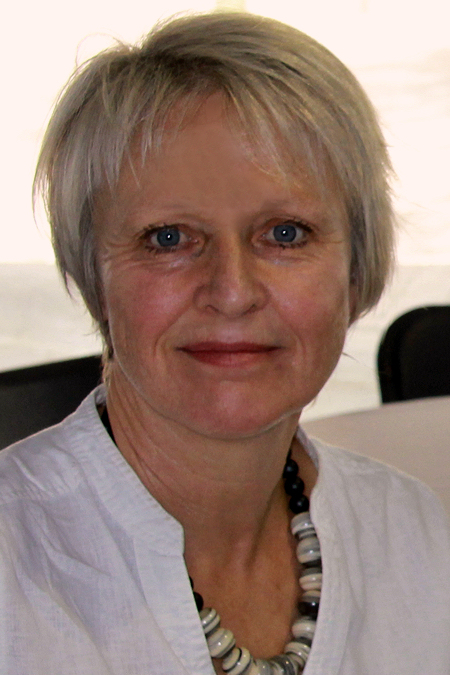
- Kathy Page at the 2014 Texas Book Festival.
- Born: 8 April 1958 (age 68); London, United Kingdom
- Occupation: Novelist
- Writing career
- Genres: novel, short story
- Notable work: The Find

Kathy Page (born 8 April 1958) is a British-Canadian writer.

She is the author of seven previous novels, including The Story of My Face (longlisted for the Orange Prize in 2002) and Alphabet (nominated for the Governor General's Literary Award for fiction in Canada in 2005), as well as Canada's Giller Prize-shortlisted story collections Paradise & Elsewhere (2014) and The Two of Us (2016). Her latest novel, Dear Evelyn, was published in 2018 by And Other Stories in Europe and Biblioasis in North America.

She now lives on Salt Spring Island, British Columbia, Canada.

== Early life ==
Kathy Page was born on 8 April 1958 in London, U.K. She received an Honours BA in English and related literature from the University of York, and an MA in creative writing from the University of East Anglia. In the late 1990s, she trained as a psychotherapist and worked briefly in a therapeutic community for drug users. She currently resides on Salt Spring Island with her husband, and two children.

== Career ==
Page's 2002 book The Story of My Face, which was long listed for the Orange Prize for Fiction in the U.K. Alphabet, published in 2005, was nominated for the Governor General's Literary Award in Canada in 2005. The novel The Find was published in April 2010 and was shortlisted for the ReLit Award in 2011. Her novel Paradise and Elsewhere, a collection of short stories, was published in June 2014.

Page has also worked as a university lecturer (University of London), distance learning tutor (Open College of the Arts, in the U.K.), writer in residence (University of Vaasa, Finland, among others), writing workshop instructor (Banff Centre) and carpenter/joiner. She moved with her family to Saltspring Island, British Columbia, in 2001 and teaches fiction at Vancouver Island University.

== Prizes and honours ==
- 1992 The Traveller Writing award
- 1994 Bridport Prize (for short story)
- 2002 Longlist, Orange Prize for Fiction (for The Story of My Face)
- 2005 Shortlist, Governor General's Literary Award (for Alphabet)
- 2011 Shortlist, ReLit Award (for The Find)
- 2014 Longlist, Scotiabank Giller Prize (for Paradise and Elsewhere)
- 2016 Longlist, Scotiabank Giller Prize (for The Two of Us)
- 2018 Winner, Rogers Writers' Trust Fiction Prize (for Dear Evelyn)

== Bibliography ==
=== Novels ===
- Back in the First Person (1986) Virago Press
- The Unborn Dreams of Clara Riley (1987) Virago Press
- Island Paradise (1988) Methuen Publishing/Minerva
- Frankie Styne & the Silver Man (1992) Methuen Publishing
- The Story of My Face (2002) Weidenfeld & Nicolson/McArthur
- Alphabet (2005) Weidenfeld & Nicolson/McArthur
- The Find (2010) McArthur & Company Publishing
- Dear Evelyn (2018) And Other Stories

=== Short story collections ===
- As In Music (1990) Methuen Publishing
- Paradise and Elsewhere (2014) Biblioasis
- The Two of Us (2016) Biblioasis

=== Anthologies ===
- "Leaf in the Works" and "The Politics of the Superficial", in Writing Women VI, No. 3, 1982
- "The Garden", Everywoman, 1988
- "The Green Table", Panurge 10, 1989
- "The Ancient Siddanese", Minerva Anthology of C20 Women's Writing, edited by Judy Cooke, Minerva, 1991
- "Wonder", New Writing Two, edited by Malcolm Bradbury and Andrew Motion, Minerva, 1993
- "The Gymnasium", Best Short Stories 1993, edited by Giles Gordon and David Hughes, Heinemann, 1993
- "Woodsmoke", Class Work, edited by Malcolm Bradbury, Heinemann, 1995
- "My Beautiful Wife", Back Rubs, edited by Alison Campbell, et al., Serpent's Tail, 1996
- "It Is July Now", Wild Ways, edited by Margo Daly and Peter Porter, Vintage, 1997
- "Bees", New Writing Six, edited by A.S. Byatt and Peter Porter, Vintage, 1997
- "The Question", Cheatin' Heart, edited by Longinotto and Rosenthall, Serpent's Tail, 1999
- "Of Paradise", Other Voices, Vol. 13, Millennium issue, 2000
- "It Is July Now", 10 Women Writers, edited by Barbara Puschmann-Nalenz, Reclam, 2000
- "Rosemary", The Lighted Room, edited by Margo Daly, Bloomsbury Publishing, 2002
- "The Right Thing to Say", Ars Medica, 2009

=== Non-fiction ===
- "The Pike's Heart", The Traveller, 1992
- "The Family Inside", Prison Writing, Vol 1, No. 1, 1992
- "Success?", Panurge 15, 1996
- "The Butterfly", in Humane Prisons and How to Run Them, edited by David Jones, Radcliffe, UK, 2007
- "Five Times", in Great Expectations, edited by Lisa Moore and Dede Crane
