= Stephen Henighan =

Canadian novelist, short story writer, journalist and academic

- Born: 19 June 1960 (age 66); Hamburg, Germany
- Education: Swarthmore College; Concordia University; University of Oxford
- Occupations: writer, journalist, academic

Stephen Patrick Glanvill Henighan (born 19 June 1960) is a Canadian novelist, short story writer, journalist, translator and academic.

Henighan has written short stories and novels about immigrants and travellers. As an academic at the University of Guelph, he is known for his scholarly criticism on, and translations of, Latin American literature, and Lusophone African fiction. As a journalist, Henighan is also known for hard-hitting criticism of Canadian literature and culture.

== Early life ==
Born in Hamburg, Germany, Henighan arrived in Canada at the age of five and grew up in rural eastern Ontario.

== Education and career ==
Henighan studied political science at Swarthmore College in Pennsylvania, where he won the Potter Short Story Prize in April 1981. From 1984 to 1992 he lived in Montreal as a freelance writer and completed an M.A. at Concordia University. Between 1992 and 1996 he earned a doctorate in Spanish American literature at Wadham College, Oxford. While at Oxford, Henighan became the first writer to have stories published in three different editions of the annual May Anthology of Oxford and Cambridge Short Stories. He also studied in Colombia, Romania and Germany. From 1996 to 1998 Henighan taught Latin American literature at Queen Mary & Westfield College, University of London. Since 1999 he has taught at the University of Guelph, Ontario.

Henighan has published six novels. His novels describe cultural conflict in inter-American or trans-Atlantic contexts. The Places Where Names Vanish (1998) follows a young woman from her village in Ecuador to immigrant life in Montreal. The Streets of Winter (2004) shuttles between characters of different linguistic, religious, ethnic and cultural backgrounds as they are drawn into the struggle for control of a crumbling Montreal apartment building. The Path of the Jaguar (2016), narrated from the point-of-view of a young Indigenous Maya woman, was praised for its depiction of Mayan life and was translated into Spanish. The narrator of Mr Singh Among the Fugitives (2017), a satire on the Canadian literary scene, is a Sikh immigrant to Canada who becomes a minor celebrity by contributing diversity to literary gatherings. In Henighan's most ambitious novel, The World of After (2021), three male Oxford graduate students, two of them Canadian, respond to a shattered triangular friendship by pursuing divergent fates in eastern Europe in the aftermath of the fall of the Berlin Wall.

Henighan's short stories have been published in Canada, the U.S., Great Britain and, in translation, in Europe, in journals such as Ploughshares, Lettre Internationale, The Malahat Review, The Fiddlehead., Queen's Quarterly, Prairie Fire. Henighan's stories feature immigrants, travellers and other displaced people caught between cultures. According to the journal Canadian Literature, Henighan is "a writer who looks hard at the complexities and rebarbative elements of the multicultural, globalized world we live in."

Henighan's journalism has appeared in The Times Literary Supplement, The Walrus, 'The Globe and Mail, Toronto Life, Adbusters and the Montreal Gazette. From 2003 to 2023 Henighan wrote a column on Canadian and international culture in Geist. He has been a finalist for the Governor General's Award, and the Canada Prize in the Humanities. In 2006 Henighan set off a controversy when he attacked the Giller Prize.

As an academic, he has published articles on Latin American literature and Lusophone African fiction, a book on the Nobel Prize-winning Guatemalan novelist Miguel Ángel Asturias and a 776-page study of the analysis of the history of Nicaragua presented in the work of Ernesto Cardenal and Sergio Ramírez. In 2026, Henighan published a two-volume study of the history and literature of Angola.

Henighan has published translations from Spanish, Portuguese and Romanian, including Angolan writer Ondjaki, Cabo Verdean writer Germano Almeida, Nicaraguan poet Carlos Rigby, and the interwar Romanian writers Mihail Sebastian. and Jean Bart (born Eugeniu Botez). From 2007 to 2024 Henighan was general editor of a translation series run by Biblioasis, a literary publisher based in Windsor, Ontario. Writers recruited by Henighan for the Biblioasis International Translation Series include Horacio Castellanos Moya, Mia Couto, Pepetela, Thomas Melle, Liliana Heker and Emili Teixidor. As a translator, Henighan has twice been a longlist finalist for the Best Translated Book Award, and once for the International Dublin Literary Award.

== Bibliography ==
=== Novels ===
- Other Americas. Toronto: Simon & Pierre, 1990.
- The Places Where Names Vanish. Saskatoon: Thistledown Press, 1998.
- The Streets of Winter. Saskatoon: Thistledown Press, 2004.
- The Path of the Jaguar. Saskatoon: Thistledown Press, 2016.
- Mr Singh Among the Fugitives. Montreal: Linda Leith Publishing, 2017.
- The World of After. Toronto: Cormorant Books, 2021.

=== Short story collections ===
- Nights in the Yungas. Saskatoon: Thistledown Press, 1992.
- North of Tourism. Dunvegan, Ont.: Cormorant Books, 1999.
- A Grave in the Air. Saskatoon: Thistledown Press, 2007.
- Blue River and Red Earth. Toronto: Cormorant Books, 2018.

=== Non-fiction ===
- Assuming the Light: The Parisian Literary Apprenticeship of Miguel Ángel Asturias. Oxford, UK: Legenda, 1999.
- When Words Deny the World: The Reshaping of Canadian Writing. Erin, Ont.: The Porcupine's Quill, 2002.
- Lost Province: Adventures in a Moldovan Family. Vancouver: Beach Holme Publishing, 2002.
- A Report on the Afterlife of Culture. Emeryville, Ont.: Biblioasis, 2008.
- A Green Reef: The Impact of Climate Change. Westmount, QC: Linda Leith Publishing, 2013.
- Sandino's Nation: Ernesto Cardenal and Sergio Ramirez Writing Nicaragua, 1940-2012. Montreal: McGill-Queen's University Press, 2014.
- Fissured Ground: National History in Angolan Fiction, Origins to Independence. Montreal: McGill-Queen's University Press, 2026.
- A Single Nation: National History in Angolan Fiction, Independence to 2025. Montreal: McGill-Queen's University Press, 2026.

=== Translations ===
- Good Morning Comrades (novel by Angolan writer Ondjaki). Emeryville, Ont.: Biblioasis, 2008.
- The Accident (novel by Romanian writer Mihail Sebastian). Emeryville, Ont: Biblioasis, 2011.
- Granma Nineteen and the Soviet's Secret (novel by Angolan writer Ondjaki). Windsor: Biblioasis, 2014.
- Transparent City (novel by Angolan writer Ondjaki). Windsor: Biblioasis, 2018. U.K. Edition: London: Europa Editions UK, 2021.
- The Country of Toó (novel by Guatemalan writer Rodrigo Rey Rosa). Windsor: Biblioasis, 2023.
- Europolis (novel by Romanian writer Jean Bart, born Eugeniu Botez). Budapest- New York - Vienna: CEU Press, 2025.
- Handbook of Romanian Literature (multi-author literary history, edited by Oana Fotache and Liviu Papadima), Leiden: De Gruyter Brill, 2026.

=== Collaborative books ===
- Guiomar Borrás A., James M. Hendrickson, Stephen Henighan, Antonio Velásquez, Intercambios. Spanish for Global Communication. Toronto: Thomson, Nelson, 2006.
- Stephen Henighan and Candace Johnson, editors. Human and Environmental Justice in Guatemala. Toronto: University of Toronto Press, 2018.
