= Biblioasis =

Canadian independent bookstore and publishing company

- Founded: 1998; 28 years ago
- Founder: Dan Wells
- Country of origin: Canada
- Headquarters location: 1520 Wyandotte Street East; Windsor, Ontario, Canada
- Distribution: University of Toronto Press Distribution (Canada); Consortium Book Sales & Distribution (international)
- Publication types: Books, magazines
- Official website: biblioasis.com

Biblioasis is a Canadian independent bookstore and publishing company, based in Windsor, Ontario.

Founded by Dan Wells as a bookstore in 1998, the company began publishing books in 2004 with its first titles being poetry collections by Salvatore Ala and Goran Simić. The company has gone on to become one of Canada's most prestigious small press publishing houses; in 2015 alone, the company's titles included Anakana Schofield's Martin John and Samuel Archibald's Arvida, both of which were shortlisted Giller Prize finalists; Russell Smith's Confidence, which was a longlisted Giller Prize nominee and a shortlisted Rogers Writers' Trust Fiction Prize finalist; and Robyn Sarah's My Shoes Are Killing Me, which won the Governor General's Award for English-language poetry.

In 2019, Biblioasis acquired the North American publishing rights to Lucy Ellmann's Ducks, Newburyport. After being shortlisted for the United Kingdom's Booker Prize, the book saw heavy demand. Wells stated that Ducks was Biblioasis's fastest-selling title to-date. That same year, Biblioasis published Mark Bourrie's best-seller Bush Runner, which won the $30,000 RBC Taylor Prize for literary non-fiction.

Other writers published by Biblioasis have included Kathy Page, Terry Griggs, Kevin Hardcastle, Alex Boyd, Ray Robertson, Cynthia Flood, Stephen Henighan, Richard Kelly Kemick, Elizabeth Bachinsky, Rebecca Rosenblum, Alexandra Oliver, Kris Bertin and Chris Turner.

Bibloasis publishes the magazine Canadian Notes & Queries, currently edited by Emily Donaldson. One distinguishing characteristic of Biblioasis has been Dan Wells's delegation of the selection of parts of its list to volunteer editors, most notably John Metcalf (Canadian fiction), who in 2014 was awarded the Libris Award as Editor of the Year, largely for his work with Biblioasis. Other contributing editors include Stephen Henighan (international translations), Natalie Hamilton (English and Irish fiction) and, in the company's early years, Zachariah Wells (poetry). Biblioasis also publishes the annual anthologies Best Canadian Stories, Best Canadian Essays and Best Canadian Poetry.
