= Wordfest =

Literary festival in Canada

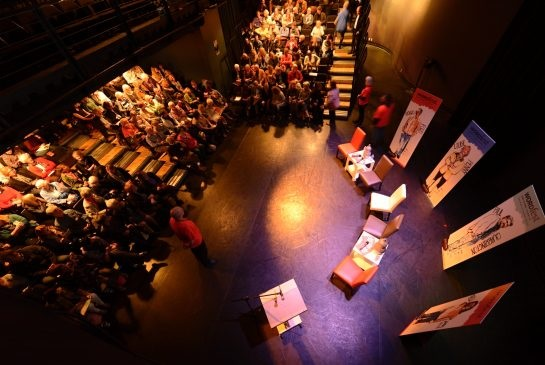
Wordfest 2016

Wordfest is a not-for-profit arts organization that produces one of Canada's largest international literary festivals, taking place each October in Calgary, Alberta. In addition to the yearly festival, Wordfest also facilitates and hosts year-round events, including poetry and spoken word performances, current event panels, publishing industry workshops, art installations, and youth and multilingual programming.

== History ==
Wordfest originated as an idea conceived by Donald Stein, then associate director of the Banff Centre for Arts and Creativity, who in 1996 envisioned the coordination of a southern Albertan writers' festival. He contacted Darlene Quaife, then president of the Writer's Guild of Alberta, and Peter Oliva, then owner of Pages Books on Kensington in Calgary, and together the three "assembled a team that reads like an honour roll of Calgary's literary community at the time" including booksellers, writers, a Calgary Herald books editor, and representatives from the Calgary Public Library and CBC Radio, among others. With Anne Green as festival producer, Wordfest's first festival featured 50 authors and two dozen events over the course of four days.

1997 marked the incorporation of Wordfest as a not-for-profit, and also was the first year of the Summit Salon writers' retreat hosted by the Banff Centre, which immediately followed the festivals for years.

Anne Green was the Director of Wordfest from March, 1996 to December, 2010.

Jo Steffens was Wordfest's director from December 2010 to 2015; under Steffens' leadership, Wordfest was the recipient of the Rozsa Award in Arts Management for Innovation in 2014.

Shelley Youngblut was named interim General Director of Wordfest in May 2015 and in December 2015 became the permanent General Director. Youngblut, previously an editor with The Globe and Mail and a writer with ESPN, has helped Wordfest grow into a "celebration of ideas even more than[...]a celebration of books", expanding its focus to more heavily include the abstract while still maintaining its core literary aspect. In December 2017, Wordfest moved their offices to the second floor of Calgary's Memorial Park Library, which includes a 110-seat "Engagement Lab" where many of Wordfest's readings and other events are held.

== Events ==
Wordfest's eponymous festival is held annually in October. It features on average 80 writers, both big-name stars and emerging writers, in a mix of 65 events and performances throughout Calgary. The Festival offers a wide variety of public events: readings, panel discussions, interviews, multimedia performances, workshops, cabarets, book signings, literary death matches, spoken word performances, informal public receptions and more. Festival alumni include Margaret Atwood, Roch Carrier, Austin Clarke, Douglas Coupland, Roddy Doyle, Timothy Findley, Richard Ford, Lawrence Hill, Nancy Huston, Tomson Highway, Wayne Johnston, Thomas King, Alistair MacLeod, E. Annie Proulx, the late Mordecai Richler, Jane Urquhart and Guy Vanderhaeghe.

In the past, Wordfest's children-geared component operated under The First Calgary Savings Book Rapport Programme, an award-winning education segment that ran throughout the festival in October, bringing children's authors to schools and other public venues. According to the First Calgary Savings, "[i]n 2006, 5,600 students participated" in the Book Rapport Programme. Recently, Wordfest has expanded its youth programming to bring authors to Veronica Roth, Lemony Snicket, Ruth Ohi and Arthur Slade Calgary schools throughout the year.

Beyond the days-long festival held in October, Wordfest also coordinates single-artist readings/events, which feature one artist per night and allow more time for the exploration of their works; alumni of such events include YouTube personality and author Lilly Singh, author Barbara Gowdy, comedian and screenwriter Mike Myers, musician and actor Robbie Robertson, writer George Saunders, and Canada's governor general David Johnston. In addition to the single-artist events, Wordfest also runs Dick Lit's Trivia Night year-round (hosted by Richard Kelly Kemick), as well as a summer book club.

Wordfest has an active network of approximately two-hundred volunteers who assist with events year round.

Wordfest is supported by private donors and many organizations, including the Government of Canada, the Canada Council for the Arts, Mount Royal University, the Calgary Public Library, and the Alberta Foundation for the Arts.

== Cultural references ==
- Wordfest is the name of a festival in Michael Chabon's 1995 novel Wonder Boys.

== See also ==
- Literary Festivals In Canada
- List of festivals in Calgary
