= Richard Kelly Kemick =

Canadian author, journalist, and poet

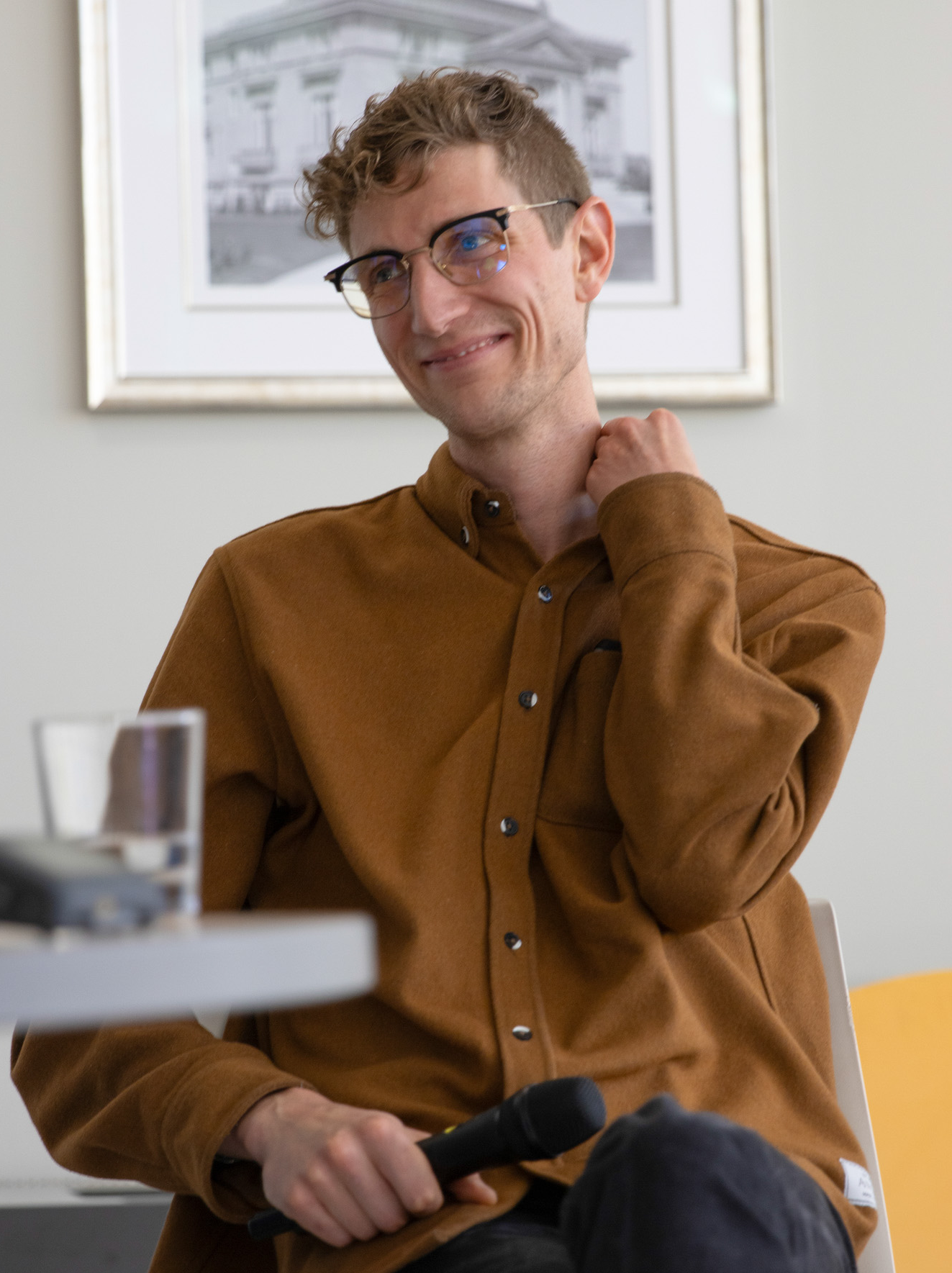
- Kemick speaking at Calgary's Wordfest in 2023
- Born: Richard Kelly Kemick; 28 December 1989 (age 36); Calgary, Alberta, Canada
- Occupation: Writer
- Website: richardkemick.com

Richard Kelly Kemick (born 28 December 1989) is a Canadian author, journalist, and poet. Most notably, he has published a book of poetry, a short story collection, and two books of creative nonfiction.

== Biography ==
Kemick was born in Calgary, Alberta.

In 2012, he graduated with a BA degree from the University of British Columbia, followed by an MA from the University of New Brunswick in 2014. In 2020, he received a PhD in English literature from the University of Calgary.

== Career ==
In 2016, Kemick published the poetry collection Caribou Run with Goose Lane Editions.

In 2019, he published a book of creative nonfiction book, I Am Herod, again with Goose Lane Editions. I Am Herod depicted Kemick's time acting in The Canadian Badlands Passion Play, North America's largest Passion Play on the Canada's largest outdoor stage. I Am Herod was shortlisted in 2020 for the Writers' Guild of Alberta's Wilfrid Eggleston Award for Nonfiction.

Kemick wrote and produced a five-part podcast, Natural Life, in 2022. The series focuses on Kemick's cousin, who is serving a natural life sentence (life imprisonment without the possibility of parole) in Michigan for first-degree murder.

In 2023, Kemick wrote the book for Amor De Cosmos: A Delusional Musical, (music by Lindsey Walker) which was performed in Toronto, Hamilton, and Edmonton, and was named a Critics Pick of the 2023 Toronto Fringe Festival. The one-person play, written entirely in iambic pentameter, centres on British Columbia's second premier, Amor De Cosmos, who rose to national prominence before being declared legally insane.

Kemick is also known as a short story writer, having published widely in literary journals and magazines across North America. In 2017, he was shortlisted for the Journey Prize (a prize for emerging writers), only to be disqualified when "concerns about similarities between his short story 'The Most Human Part of You' and a piece by American author Amy Hempel" emerged; in an interview, Kemick apologized and took responsibility for his story. In 2024, Kemick published his first book of short stories, Hello, Horse. The collection was published by Biblioasis under the John Metcalf imprint. Kirkus Reviews awarded the collection a starred review and stated, "The tales here mix whimsy, weirdness, lust, and Canadian politics, bringing to mind George Saunders and the slackers from Wayne's World". The title story, "Hello, Horse," (The Fiddlehead), won the Writers' Guild of Alberta's Howard O’Hagan Short Story Award in 2019. In 2017, Kemick won the Canadian National Magazine Award's gold medal in Short Story for his story "The Unitarian Church's Annual Young Writer's Short Story Competition" (The New Quarterly).

In 2026, Kemick published Decadence, a collection of essays he had written over the decade previous. He has contributed regularly to Maclean's and the Walrus magazine. In 2016, he won the Canadian National Magazine Award's gold medal in One of a Kind for his story "Playing God" (The Walrus).

He is also a regular contributor to CBC Radio, having been featured on shows such as The Doc Project and Now or Never.

== Bibliography ==
- Caribou Run Fredericton : Goose Lane Editions, 2016. ISBN 9780864928757
- I Am Herod Fredericton : Goose Lane Editions, 2019. ISBN 9781773101422
- Hello, Horse Windsor : Biblioasis, 2024. ISBN 9781771966078
- Decadence Windsor : Biblioasis, 2026. ISBN 9781771967136
