= The New Quarterly =

Canadian literary magazine

- Editor: Pamela Mulloy
- Former editors: Kim Jernigan, Peter Hinchcliffe
- Categories: Literary magazine
- Frequency: Quarterly
- Format: Print Magazine; Digital
- Publisher: The New Quarterly
- Founded: 1981; 44 years ago
- Country: Canada
- Based in: Waterloo, Ontario
- Language: English
- Website: www.tnq.ca
- ISSN: 0227-0455

The New Quarterly is a literary magazine based in Waterloo, Ontario that publishes short fiction, poetry, and creative non-fiction from emerging and established Canadian writers.

== History and profile ==
The New Quarterly was established in 1981. The magazine is published on a quarterly basis. It publishes Canadian poetry, prose, creative non-fiction, and occasional interviews with established writers. However, its mandate is to encourage and nurture new and emerging talent. The magazine tries to strike a balance between a serious and playful tone, above all celebrating literature. Each issue is given a loose theme; for example, "In which science becomes metaphor, poets don lab coats...", "Something About the Animal", and "Fathers, Mothers, Lovers & Others".

The magazine has won several national magazine awards, including the Gold Medals for short fiction by Tamas Dobozy in 2014 and by Richard Kelly Kemick in 2017. Writing from past issues has been nominated for Canadian National Magazine Awards, and McClelland & Stewart's Journey Prize.

== Annual writing contests ==
The New Quarterly runs annual writing contests in all three genres they publish: short fiction, poetry, and creative non-fiction.

The Nick Blatchford Occasional Verse Contest

Sponsored by former The New Quarterly editor Kim Jernigan and family in celebration of her father, Nick Blatchford, this contest is for poems written in response to an existing occasion, personal or public, or poems that make an occasion of something ordinary or by virtue of the poet’s attention. All entries are considered for publication, and the winner receives a $1000 prize. Entrants can submit up to 3 poems to be considered. The annual submission deadline is February 28.

The Edna Staebler Personal Essay Contest

Edna Staebler was a literary journalism pioneer and founding member of The New Quarterly whose generous bequest in 2005 allowed The New Quarterly to establish this award, in her honour. All entrants are considered for publication, and the winner receives a $1000 prize. The annual submission deadline is March 28.

The Peter Hinchcliffee Short Fiction Award

This contest honours distinguished St Jerome’s University lecturer, Peter Hinchcliffe, who was instrumental in founding The New Quarterly and who served for many years as co-editor. All entrants are considered for publication, and the winner receive a $1000 prize. The annual submission deadline is May 28.

== Wild Writers Festival ==
The New Quarterly is also the host of the Wild Writers Literary Festival since 2011. Set during the first weekend in November, readers and writers come together to attend workshops, panels, and conversations about writers and the craft of writing. As current editor, Pamela Mulloy, explained, ""Our main interest is drawing together new, emerging and established writers in an open and inviting setting so they can discuss the craft of writing. We are eager for local writers to learn about the writer's trade from professionals." As a means of attracting younger writers, the festival also sponsors up to 10 high school students.

== See also ==
- List of literary magazines
