= Carlos Rigby =

Black Nicaribean poet from Nicaragua

- Born: June 19, 1945; Laguna de Perlas, Nicaragua
- Died: May 23, 2017 (aged 71)
- Occupation: Poet
- Writing career
- Pen name: El poeta Rigby
- Language: Spanish, English, Creole
- Period: 20th and 21st centuries
- Genre: Poetry

Carlos Rigby (June 19, 1945 – May 23, 2017) was a Black West Indian poet from Laguna de Perlas on the Atlantic coast of Nicaragua.

== Poetry ==
Known as "the poet Rigby" (el poeta Rigby), Rigby is often cited with David McField as the most important poets of Nicaragua's Atlantic coast. Rigby's work particularly focuses on the oral poetic tradition, and incorporates a variety of languages including English, Spanish and Creole. One of Rigby's translators, Stephen Henighan, notes that for Rigby as for many Nicaraguans of West Indian descent living on the country's Caribbean coast (and in contrast to Nicaraguans from the western part of the country), English was the language Rigby spoke at home, while Spanish was the language of his formal education and eventually the primary language for his poetry, though his poems also involve "Spanish-English puns and [are] interspersed with chant-like refrains in Native American languages" spoken in areas surrounding where he grew up. Henighan writes:

As his translator, I found myself with the bizarre task of restoring Rigby's poetry to his mother tongue, which, through a fluke of history, is not his literary language. Rigby and I speak to each other in Spanish. Occasionally he will ask me the English word for something related to computers or television. The modern part of Rigby's life has taken place in Spanish; English, for him, is the language of a rural, natural world, of parents and children living in villages in the jungle. My translations must find a way to reflect the fact that for Rigby, in contrast to the experience of most people on this planet, English is a language that expresses what the world was like before technology.

== Political engagement ==
Among the Atlantic coast intellectuals who supported the Sandinistas from the early 1970s, Rigby also traveled to London in support of anti-colonial resistance over the Falkland Islands, as well as to New York, supporting the Black Panthers.

== Works ==
- "If I Were May" in Volcán, ed. Alejandro Murguia (City Lights Books, 1983), pp. 103–105.
- "If I Were May" trans. into English by Charles Tarzian, BOMB Magazine, Issue 12, April 1, 1985.
