= Wendte, South Dakota =

Unincorporated community in South Dakota, U.S.

Coordinates: 44°14′40″N 100°39′54″W

Wendte is an unincorporated community in Stanley County, in the U.S. state of South Dakota.

== History ==
Wendte has its start in 1906 when the railroad was extended to that point. The community was named for H. S. Wendte, an early settler. A post office called Wendte was established in 1906, and remained in operation until it was discontinued in 1960.
