= List of Irish films =

This is chronology of films produced in Ireland:

== 1910s ==
Year	Title	Director	Actors	Genre	Comments
1910	A Lad from Old Ireland	Sidney Olcott	Sidney Olcott and Gene Gauntier	Drama	
1911	The Colleen Bawn	Sidney Olcott and Gene Gauntier	Sidney Olcott	Drama	
1911	Rory O'More	Sidney Olcott	Jack J. Clark and Gene Gauntier	Rebel drama	
1914	For Ireland's Sake	Sidney Olcott	Gene Gauntier, Jack J. Clark and Sidney Olcott	Rebel drama	
1914	Ireland a Nation	Walter MacNamara	Barry O'Brien, P J Bourke, Fred O'Donovan, Barney Magee	Rebel drama	Expanded version produced in 1920.
1915	Regeneration	Raoul Walsh	Rockliffe Fellowes, Anna Q. Nilsson, Carl Harbaugh, James A. Marcus	Irish immigrant drama	Often cited as one of the first full-length gangster films
1916	O'Neil of the Glen	Fred O'Donovan	J. M. Kerrigan, Brian Magowan, Nora Clancy	Romance	
1917	When Love Came To Gavin Burke	Fred O'Donovan	Fred O'Donovan, Nora Clancy, Oonah Halpin, Brian Magowan, Valentine Roberts	Melodrama	
1918	Knocknagow	Fred O'Donovan	Brian Magowan, Fred O'Donovan, Arthur Shields, Brenda Burke, Kathleen Murphy, Cyril Cusack	Melodrama	

== 1920s ==
Year	Title	Director	Actors	Genre	Comments
1920	Willy Reilly and His Colleen Bawn	John MacDonagh	Brian Magowan, Frances Alexander, John MacDonagh	historical drama	Second and final major film of the Film Company of Ireland
1920	In the Days of St Patrick	Norman Whitten	Ira Ellen, Vernon Whitten, Gilbert Green, Alice Cardinall, Dermot McCarthy	historical drama	
1922	Cruiskeen Lawn	John McDonagh	Tom Moran		Producer: Norman Whitten
1922	Casey's Millions	John McDonagh	Barrett MacDonnell, Chris Sylvester, Jimmy O'Dea	Comedy	Producer: Norman Whitten
1925	Blarney	Marcel De Sano	Ralph Graves, Paulette Duval, Renée Adorée	Comedy	
1926	Irish Destiny	George Dewhurst	Brian Magowan, Paddy Dunne Cullinan	War	Love story set in the Irish War of Independence; includes footage of actual fighting

== 1930s ==
Year	Title	Director	Actors	Genre	Comments
1934	Man of Aran	Robert Flaherty	Colman "Tiger" King, Maggie Dirrane, Michael Dirrane	Documentary	
1934	Ireland: 'The Emerald Isle'	Ruth FitzPatrick	James A. FitzPatrick (narrator)	Short Documentary/Travelogue	
1935	Guests of the Nation	Denis Johnston	Barry Fitzgerald, Cyril Cusack, Shelah Richards	Drama	
1935	Oidhche Sheanchais	Robert J. Flaherty	Seáinín Tom Ó Dioráin	Storytelling	First Irish language sync sound film Lost until 2012
1936	The Dawn	Thomas Cooper	Brian O'Sullivan	War drama	
1936	The Luck of the Irish	Donovan Pedelty	Richard Hayward, Niall MacGinnis, Kay Walsh	Drama	
1936	Irish and Proud of It	Donovan Pedelty	Richard Hayward, Dinah Sheridan and Liam Gaffney	Musical comedy	
1937	Kathleen Mavourneen	Norman Lee	Sally O'Neil, Tom Burke, Jack Daly and Sara Allgood	Musical drama	also known as Kathleen
1937	Rose of Tralee	Oswald Mitchell	Binkie Stuart, Kathleen O'Regan and Fred Conyngham	Musical	
1938	Men of Ireland	Richard Bird	Brian O'Sullivan	Drama	

== 1940s ==
Year	Title	Director	Actors	Genre	Comments
1948	My Hands Are Clay	Lionel Tomlinson	Bernardette Leahy	Drama	
1949	You Can't Fool an Irishman	Alfred Travers	Tommy Duggan	comedy	

== 1950s ==
Year	Title	Director	Actors	Genre	Comments
1951	The Hills of Ireland	Harry Dugan	Pat O'Brien (narrator)	documentary travelogue	
1951	Return to Glennascaul	Hilton Edwards	Orson Welles	horror/ short	also known as Orson Welles' Ghost Story
1952	The Quiet Man	John Ford	John Wayne, Maureen O'Hara and Barry Fitzgerald	comedy	
1953	Fintona, A Study of Housing Discrimination			documentary short	Irish Government-sponsored film alleging anti-Catholic housing discrimination in Fintona, Co.Tyrone. The first 3 minutes of this film is voiceover with no moving images.
1957	Pretty Polly	Tony Inglis	Noel Purcell	short	
1957	Professor Tim	Henry Cass	Bill Foley		
1957	The Rising of the Moon	John Ford	Tyrone Power (narrator), Cyril Cusack, Noel Purcell and Denis O'Dea	comedy/ drama	Three vignettes based on short stories illustrating rural Irish life: The Majesty of the Law, A Minute's Wait and 1921
1959	Home Is the Hero	Fielder Cook	Walter Macken	drama romance	Entered into the 9th Berlin International Film Festival
1959	Mise Éire	George Morrison	Liam Budhlaeir (narrator)	Documentary	Chronicles Irish history from 1890s-1918, including the 1916 Easter Rising. It was the first feature length Irish language film.
1959	Shake Hands with the Devil	Michael Anderson	James Cagney, Don Murray, Dana Wynter and Glynis Johns	historical drama	Portrays the Irish War of Independence
1959	Broth of a Boy	George Pollock	Barry Fitzgerald, June Thorburn, Eddie Golden and Godfrey Quigley	comedy	
1959	This Other Eden	Muriel Box	Audrey Dalton, Leslie Phillips, Niall MacGinnis and Geoffrey Golden	Comedy-drama	
1959	Darby O'Gill and the Little People	Robert Stevenson	Albert Sharpe, Janet Munro, Sean Connery and Jimmy O'Dea	children's	

== 1960s ==
Year	Title	Director	Actors	Genre	Comments
1961	Saoirse?	George Morrison	Liam Budhlaeir (narrator)	Documentary	The follow-up to Mise Éire (1959)
1963	Dementia 13	Francis Ford Coppola	William Campbell, Luana Anders, Patrick Magee	Horror-thriller	also known as The Haunted and the Hunted. Produced by Roger Corman
1967	Rocky Road to Dublin	Peter Lennon	Seán Ó Faoláin, Conor Cruise O'Brien, John Huston and Father Michael Cleary	Documentary	Shown at Cannes festival, shunned in Ireland
1967	Ulysses	Joseph Strick	Barbara Jefford, Milo O'Shea, Maurice Roëves, T. P. McKenna	Drama	Adaptation of James Joyce's novel, Ulysses
1969	Sinful Davey	John Huston	John Hurt, Pamela Franklin, Nigel Davenport, Fionnula Flanagan and Anjelica Huston	Drama, Comedy	

== 1970s ==
Year	Title	Director	Actors	Genre	Comments
1970	Quackser Fortune Has a Cousin in the Bronx	Waris Hussein	Gene Wilder, Margot Kidder	Comedy	
1970	Ryan's Daughter	David Lean	Robert Mitchum, Trevor Howard, Christopher Jones, John Mills and Sarah Miles	Drama	
1971	Flight of the Doves	Ralph Nelson	Ron Moody, Jack Wild, Dana	Children's	Based on a novel by Walter Macken
1972	Images	Robert Altman	Susannah York, René Auberjonois, Marcel Bozzuffi, Hugh Millais and Cathryn Harrison	Psychological Thriller	
1973	The Mackintosh Man	John Huston	Paul Newman, Dominique Sanda, James Mason, Noel Purcell, Joe Lynch, Donal McCann	Spy thriller	Filmed in England, Malta, and Ireland
1974	Zardoz	John Boorman	Sean Connery, Charlotte Rampling and Sara Kestelman	Science Fiction	
1975	Caoineadh Airt Uí Laoire	Bob Quinn	John Arden, Seán Bán Breathnach	Drama	Based on the 18th-century poem Caoineadh Áirt Uí Laoghaire by Eibhlín Dubh Ní Chonaill
1977	Poitín	Bob Quinn	Cyril Cusack, Donal McCann and Niall Toibin	Drama	
1977	A Portrait of the Artist as a Young Man	Joseph Strick	Bosco Hogan, T. P. McKenna, John Gielgud, Rosaleen Linehan, Maureen Potter, Niall Buggy, Bryan Murray,	Drama	Adaptation of the novel by James Joyce

== 1980s ==
Year	Title	Director	Actors	Genre	Comments
1981	Excalibur	John Boorman	Nigel Terry, Helen Mirren, Gabriel Byrne, Liam Neeson	Drama	
1982	The Ballroom of Romance	Pat O'Connor	Brenda Fricker, John Kavanagh, Cyril Cusack, Bríd Brennan, Mick Lally and Joe Pilkington	Drama	
1983	Attracta	Kieran Hickey	Wendy Hiller, Kate Thompson, John Kavanagh and Joe McPartland	drama	
1984	The Country Girls	Desmond Davis	Sam Neill, Niall Tóibín		Based on the 1960 Edna O'Brien novel of the same name, which was banned in Ireland.
1984	Anne Devlin	Pat Murphy	Brid Brennan and Bosco Hogan	drama	Entered into the 14th Moscow International Film Festival
1984	Cal	Pat O'Connor	Helen Mirren, John Lynch	Drama	Helen Mirren won the award for best actress at the 1984 Cannes Film Festival
1985	Lamb	Colin Gregg	Liam Neeson, Hugh O'Connor Ian Bannen	drama	
1986	Rawhead Rex	George Pavlou	David Dukes, Kelly Piper, Niall Toibin, Cora Venus Lunny and Donal McCann	Horror	Screenplay by Clive Barker
	Eat The Peach	Peter Ormrod	Stephen Brennan (actor), Eamon Morrissey (actor), Catherine Byrne (actor), Niall Tobin	Comedy	Film4 Strongbow production.
1987	The Dead	John Huston	Anjelica Huston and Donal McCann	Drama	The last film that Huston directed, released posthumously. Adapted from the short story "The Dead" by James Joyce
1988	Taffin	Francis Megahy	Pierce Brosnan, Ray McAnally and Alison Doody	Thriller	
1988	Da	Matt Clark	Martin Sheen, Barnard Hughes and William Hickey	Comedy-drama	Written by Irish playwright and journalist Hugh Leonard, adapted from his play Da.
1988	High Spirits	Neil Jordan	Daryl Hannah, Peter O'Toole, Steve Guttenberg, Beverly D'Angelo, Jennifer Tilly, Peter Gallagher, Liam Neeson and Martin Ferrero	Fantasy comedy	Irish-British-American co-production
1988	Reefer and the Model	Joe Comerford	Ian McElhinney, Carol Scanlan, Sean Lawlor and Ray McBride	Drama	Nominated in three categories at the European Film Awards
1988	The Land Before Time	Don Bluth	Gabriel Damon, Candace Hutson, Judith Barsi and Will Ryan	Animated adventure drama	
1989	All Dogs Go to Heaven	Don Bluth	Loni Anderson, Judith Barsi, Dom DeLuise, Melba Moore, Charles Nelson Reilly, Burt Reynolds and Vic Tayback	Animated musical fantasy comedy-drama	
1989	My Left Foot: The Story of Christy Brown	Jim Sheridan	Daniel Day-Lewis, Brenda Fricker, Ray McAnally and Fiona Shaw	biography-drama	Day-Lewis won the Academy Award for Best Actor in a Leading Role and Fricker won for Best Actress in a Supporting Role. The film was also nominated for Best Adapted Screenplay, Best Director and Best Picture in the 62nd Academy Awards

== 1990s ==
Year	Title	Director	Actors	Genre	Comments
1990	The Field	Jim Sheridan	Richard Harris, Brenda Fricker	Drama	
1991	The Commitments	Alan Parker	Colm Meaney	Comedy	
1991	December Bride	Thaddeus O'Sullivan	Saskia Reeves, Donal McCann, Ciarán Hinds	Drama	
1991	Hear My Song	Peter Chelsom	Ned Beatty, Adrian Dunbar, Tara Fitzgerald	Comedy	Won the British Comedy Award for Best Comedy Film
1991	Rock-a-Doodle	Don Bluth	Glen Campbell, Eddie Deezen, Sandy Duncan, Ellen Greene, Phil Harris, Christopher Plummer, Charles Nelson Reilly, Toby Scott Ganger	Live-action/animated musical comedy	
1992	Into the West	Mike Newell	Gabriel Byrne, Ciarán Fitzgerald, Rúaidhrí Conroy	Family, Adventure	
1992	You, Me & Marley	Richard Spence	Marc O'Shea, Bronagh Gallagher, Michael Liebmann, Michael Gregory	Drama	
1993	In the Name of the Father	Jim Sheridan	Daniel Day-Lewis, Pete Postlethwaite, Emma Thompson	Drama	Won the Golden Bear at Berlin
1993	The Snapper	Stephen Frears	Colm Meaney	Comedy-Drama	Straight to TV release
1994	A Man of No Importance	Suri Krishnamma	Albert Finney, Brenda Fricker, Michael Gambon	Comedy drama	
1994	Thumbelina	Don Bluth and Gary Goldman	Jodi Benson, Barbara Cook, Carol Channing, Gilbert Gottfried, Charo, John Hurt, Gino Conforti, Gary Imhoff and Joe Lynch	Independent animated musical fantasy	
1994	A Troll in Central Park	Don Bluth and Gary Goldman	Dom DeLuise, Cloris Leachman, Charles Nelson Reilly, Phillip Glasser, Tawny Sunshine Glover, Hayley Mills and Jonathan Pryce	Animated musical fantasy comedy	
1994	War of the Buttons	John Roberts	Gregg Fitzgerald, Gerard Kearney and Darragh Naughton	Drama	
1994	Ailsa	Paddy Breathnach	Brendan Coyle, Andrea Irvine, Juliette Gruber	Drama	
1995	Circle of Friends	Pat O'Connor	Minnie Driver, Chris O'Donnell	Romance	
1995	The Long Way Home	Paddy Breathnach	Niall O'Brien and Phelim Drew	Drama	
1995	The Pebble and the Penguin	Don Bluth and Gary Goldman	Martin Short, James Belushi, Tim Curry and Annie Golden	Independent animated	
1996	The Boy from Mercury	Martin Duffy	Rita Tushingham, Tom Courtenay	Drama	
1996	The Sun, Moon and Stars	Geraldine Creed	Angie Dickinson, Jason Donovan	Comedy-Drama	
1996	The Disappearance of Finbar	Sue Clayton	Jonathan Rhys Meyers	Mystery	
1996	Michael Collins	Neil Jordan	Liam Neeson, Aidan Quinn and Alan Rickman	Drama	
1996	The Van	Stephen Frears	Colm Meaney	Comedy-Drama	Entered into 1996 Cannes Film Festival
1996	Space Truckers	Stuart Gordon	Dennis Hopper, George Wendt, Debi Mazar, Stephen Dorff	Science Fiction Comedy	
1996	November Afternoon	John Carney and Tom Hall	Michael McElhatton, Jayne Snow, Mark Doherty and Tristan Gribbin	Drama	
1997	The Butcher Boy	Neil Jordan	Eamonn Owens, Seán McGinley and Peter Gowen	Comedy, Drama	Entered into the 48th Berlin International Film Festival
1997	The Boxer	Jim Sheridan	Daniel Day-Lewis, Emily Watson, Brian Cox		Entered into the 48th Berlin International Film Festival
1997	This Is the Sea	Mary McGuckian	Samantha Morton, Gabriel Byrne	Drama	
1997	The Matchmaker	Mark Joffe	Janeane Garofalo, David O'Hara, Milo O'Shea	Comedy	
1997	I Went Down	Paddy Breathnach	Peter McDonald, Brendan Gleeson	Comedy	
1998	The General	John Boorman	Brendan Gleeson, Adrian Dunbar and Jon Voight	Crime/Drama	
1998	Sweety Barrett	Stephen Bradley	Brendan Gleeson, Liam Cunningham, Lynda Steadman	Crime drama	
1999	Angela's Ashes	Alan Parker	Emily Watson, Robert Carlyle, Joe Breen and Ciaran Owens	Drama	
1999	Accelerator	Vinny Murphy	Stuart Sinclair Blyth, Gavin Kelty, Aisling O'Neill, Sorcha Gleadhill and Mary Murray (actress)	Action	

== 2000s ==
Year	Title	Director	Actors	Genre	Comments						
2000	About Adam	Gerard Stembridge	Stuart Townsend, Tommy Tiernan, Kate Hudson	Comedy, Romance	Co-produced with United Kingdom and United States						
2000	Ordinary Decent Criminal	Thaddeus O'Sullivan	Kevin Spacey, Linda Fiorentino, Peter Mullan	Comedy, Crime	Co-produced with United Kingdom, Germany and United States						
2000	Borstal Boy	Peter Sheridan	Shawn Hatosy, Danny Dyer, Lee Ingleby, Michael York	Romantic Drama	Co-produced with United Kingdom						
2000	Flick	Fintan Connolly	David Murray, Isabelle Menke, David Wilmot, Gerard Mannix Flynn	Crime							
2000	Saltwater	Conor McPherson	Peter McDonald, Brian Cox, Brendan Gleeson	Comedy-drama							
2000	Aidan Walsh: Master of the Universe	Shimmy Marcus		Documentary	"Best Feature Documentary" at 2001 Celtic Film and TV Festival						
2000	When the Sky Falls	John Mackenzie	Joan Allen, Patrick Bergin, Liam Cunningham	Crime biopic	Co-produced with United Kingdom and United States						
2000	Wild About Harry	Declan Lowney	Brendan Gleeson, Amanda Donohoe, James Nesbitt	Comedy	Co-produced with United Kingdom and Germany						
2001	Bridget Jones's Diary	Sharon Maguire	Renée Zellweger, Hugh Grant, Colin Firth	Comedy	Co-produced with United Kingdom, United States and France	2001	CHAOS/Deathgames	Geraldine Creed (director)	Tommy O'Neill, Jason Barry, Lyndsey Harris	Dystopian tale set in a Metal Circus	Co-produced with United Kingdom, Germany, Denmark and Ireland
2001	Mapmaker	Johnny Gogan	Brían F. O'Byrne, Susan Lynch, Brendan Coyle	Action, Thriller							
2001	On the Edge	John Carney	Cillian Murphy, Stephen Rea	Drama							
2001	On the Nose	David Caffrey	Dan Aykroyd, Robbie Coltrane, Brenda Blethyn	Comedy	Co-produced with Canada						
2001	When Brendan Met Trudy	Kieron J. Walsh	Peter McDonald, Flora Montgomery	Comedy, Romance							
2001	Disco Pigs	Kirsten Sheridan	Elaine Cassidy, Cillian Murphy and Brían F. O'Byrne	Drama							
2002	Bloody Sunday	Paul Greengrass	James Nesbitt, Allan Gildea, Gerard Crossan	Historical drama	Co-produced with United Kingdom						
2002	Sunday	Jimmy McGovern	Ciarán McMenamin, Eva Birthistle, Barry Mullan	Historical drama							
2002	The Magdalene Sisters	Peter Mullan	Anne-Marie Duff, Nora Jane Noone, Geraldine McEwan	Drama	Co-produced with United Kingdom						
2002	Reign of Fire	Rob Bowman	Christian Bale, Matthew McConaughey, Izabella Scorupco	Fantasy	Co-produced with United States and United Kingdom						
2003	The Actors	Conor McPherson	Michael Caine, Dylan Moran, Michael Gambon	Comedy							
2003	Bloom	Sean Walsh	Stephen Rea, Angeline Ball, Hugh O'Connor	Drama	Based on James Joyce's novel, Ulysses						
2003	The Boys from County Clare	John Irvin	Colm Meaney, Bernard Hill, Andrea Corr	Comedy drama	Co-produced with United Kingdom and Germany						
2003	Cowboys & Angels	David Gleeson	Michael Legge, Allen Leech, Amy Shiels, David Murray, Frank Kelly								
2003	Dead Bodies	Robert Quinn	Andrew Scott, Katy Davis, Kelly Reilly, Eamonn Owens	Drama							
2003	Intermission	John Crowley	Colin Farrell, Colm Meaney, Cillian Murphy	Drama							
2003	Song for a Raggy Boy	Aisling Walsh	Aidan Quinn, Iain Glen, Marc Warren	Drama							
2003	Spin the Bottle	Ian Fitzgibbon	Michael McElhatton, Peter McDonald	Comedy							
2003	Yu Ming Is Ainm Dom	Daniel O'Hara	Diyu Daniel Wu, Frank Kelly	Comedy-drama	Short film shot largely in the Irish language						
2004	Adam & Paul	Lenny Abrahamson	Tom Murphy, Mark O'Halloran	Comedy-drama							
2004	Around the World in 80 Days	Frank Coraci	Jackie Chan, Steve Coogan, Jim Broadbent	Action, Adventure, Comedy	Co-produced with United States, United Kingdom and Germany						
2004	Bridget Jones: The Edge of Reason	Beeban Kidron	Renée Zellweger, Hugh Grant, Colin Firth	Comedy	Co-produced with United Kingdom, United States and France						
2004	Churchill: The Hollywood Years	Peter Richardson	Christian Slater, Neve Campbell, Miranda Richardson	Comedy	Co-produced with United Kingdom						
2004	Dead Meat	Connor McMahon	Marian Araujo, Eoin Whelan	Horror							
2004	Ella Enchanted	Tommy O'Haver	Anne Hathaway, Hugh Dancy, Cary Elwes, Joanna Lumley, Minnie Driver, Eric Idle	Fantasy, Musical	Co-produced with United States and United Kingdom						
2004	Man About Dog	Paddy Breathnach	Allen Leech, Seán McGinley, Ciaran Nolan, Pat Shortt	Comedy							
2004	Mickybo and Me	Terry Loane	John Joe McNeill, Niall Wright, Julie Walters, Ciarán Hinds, Adrian Dunbar	Comedy-drama							
2004	Inside I'm Dancing	Damien O'Donnell	James McAvoy, Steven Robertson, Romola Garai, Brenda Fricker	Comedy-drama	Co-produced with United Kingdom and France						
2004	Omagh	Pete Travis	Gerard McSorley, Brenda Fricker	Drama, True life							
2005	Boy Eats Girl	Stephen Bradley	Samantha Mumba	Horror	Co-produced with United Kingdom						
2005	Breakfast on Pluto	Neil Jordan	Cillian Murphy, Stephen Rea, Brendan Gleeson, Liam Neeson	Comedy, Drama	Co-produced with United Kingdom						
2005	Lassie	Charles Sturridge	Jonathan Mason, Peter O'Toole, Samantha Morton, John Lynch, Peter Dinklage, Edward Fox	Adventure, Comedy-drama	Co-produced with United Kingdom, United States and France						
2005	The League of Gentlemen's Apocalypse	Steve Bendelack	Mark Gatiss, Steve Pemberton, Reece Shearsmith	Comedy	Co-produced with United Kingdom and United States						
2005	Trouble With Sex	Fintan Connolly	Aidan Gillen, Renée Weldon, Gerard Mannix Flynn	Drama							
2006	Johnny Was	Mark Hammond	Vinnie Jones, Patrick Bergin, Eriq La Salle	Action, Crime	Co-produced with United Kingdom						
2006	Once	John Carney	Glen Hansard, Markéta Irglová	Musical							
2006	The Wind That Shakes the Barley	Ken Loach	Cillian Murphy, Orla Fitzgerald	Drama, War	Co-produced with United Kingdom, Italy, Germany, France, Spain and Switzerland						
2007	And When Did You Last See Your Father?	Anand Tucker	Jim Broadbent, Colin Firth, Juliet Stevenson	Drama	Co-produced with United Kingdom						
2007	Cré na Cille	Robert Quinn	Bríd Ní Neachtain, Peadar Lamb, Macdara Ó Fátharta	Black comedy	Irish-language film. Based on Máirtín Ó Cadhain's 1949 novel Cré na Cille						
2007	Garage	Lenny Abrahamson	Pat Shortt, Anne-Marie Duff, Conor J. Ryan	Drama	Co-produced with United Kingdom						
2007	Kings	Tom Collins	Colm Meaney, Donal O'Kelly, Brendan Conroy, Donncha Crowley	Drama	Irish language film based on the book The Kings of the Kilburn High Road						
2007	Shrooms	Paddy Breathnach	Lindsey Haun, Max Kasch	Horror	Co-produced with Denmark and United Kingdom						
2008	A Film with Me in It	Ian Fitzgibbon	Mark Doherty, Dylan Moran, Amy Huberman, Keith Allen	Black comedy							
2008	How to Lose Friends & Alienate People	Robert Weide	Simon Pegg, Kirsten Dunst, Danny Huston, Gillian Anderson, Megan Fox, Jeff Bridges	Comedy	Co-produced with United Kingdom, Cayman Islands and United States						
2008	Kisses	Lance Daly	Kelly O'Neill, Shane Curry	Drama							
2008	The Last Confession of Alexander Pearce	Michael James Rowland	Adrian Dunbar, Ciarán McMenamin, Dan Wyllie, Don Hany, Chris Haywood, Bob Franklin	Drama	Co-produced with Australia						
2009	Eamon	Margaret Corkery	Robert Donnelly, Amy Kirwan, Darren Healy	Comedy, Romance							
2009	The Eclipse	Conor McPherson	Ciarán Hinds, Iben Hjejle and Aidan Quinn	Drama							
2009	Five Minutes of Heaven	Oliver Hirschbiegel	Liam Neeson, James Nesbitt	Drama	Grand Jury Prize nominated, 2009 Sundance Film Festival						
2009	Happy Ever Afters	Stephen Burke	Sally Hawkins, Tom Riley	Drama							
2009	His & Hers	Ken Wardrop		Documentary							
2009	One Hundred Mornings	Conor Horgan	Ciarán McMenamin	Drama							
2009	Perrier's Bounty	Ian Fitzgibbon	Cillian Murphy, Brendan Gleeson, Jim Broadbent	Crime, Comedy							
2009	The Secret of Kells	Tomm Moore, Nora Twomey	Brendan Gleeson, Evan McGuire, Mick Lally	Animation, Fantasy, Drama	Co-produced with France and Belgium						
2009	Steamin' + Dreamin': The Grandmaster Cash Story	Shaun O' Connor	Con Doyle, Conor Stanley, Joe Kiely, Tommy Tiernan	Comedy							

== 2010s ==
Year	Title	Director	Actors	Genre	Comments
2010	The Boogeyman	Gerard Lough	Simon Fogarty, Michael Parle	Horror	Based on a story by Stephen King
2010	Parked	Darragh Byrne	Colm Meaney, Colin Morgan	Drama	
2010	Sensation	Tom Hall	Domhnall Gleeson, Patrick Ryan, Luanne Gordon	Comedy	
2011	The Guard	John Michael McDonagh	Brendan Gleeson, Don Cheadle, Mark Strong	Comedy	Co-produced with United Kingdom
2011	The Pier	Gerard Hurley	Gerard Hurley, Karl Johnson	Drama	
2011	Closure of Catharsis	Rouzbeh Rashidi	James Devereux	Experimental	Co-produced with United Kingdom
2012	Grabbers	Jon Wright	Richard Coyle, Ruth Bradley, Russell Tovey	Sci-fi	Co-produced with United Kingdom
2012	Shadow Dancer	James Marsh	Andrea Riseborough, Clive Owen, Gillian Anderson, Aidan Gillen, Domhnall Gleeson	Drama	Co-produced with United Kingdom and France
2012	What Richard Did	Lenny Abrahamson	Jack Reynor, Róisín Murphy, Lars Mikkelsen, Lorraine Pilkington	Drama	Film of the year 2012
2012	When Ali Came to Ireland	Ross Whitaker	Muhammad Ali, Alvin Lewis, Cathal O'Shannon	Documentary	Describes Muhammad Ali's first visit to Ireland in July 1972, and his fight there against Al Lewis.
2012	Eliot & Me	Fintan Connolly	Ella Connolly, Renée Weldon, David Wilmot, Gerard Mannix Flynn	Family, Drama	
2012	King of the Travellers	Mark O'Conner	Michael Collins, John Connors, Peter Coonan, Carla McGlynn		
2012	Byzantium	Neil Jordan	Saoirse Ronan, Gemma Arterton, Sam Riley, Jonny Lee Miller	Thriller Drama	Co-produced with United Kingdom and United States
2013	A Belfast Story	Nathan Todd	Colm Meaney, Malcolm Sinclair & Tommy O'Neill	Crime, Drama	
2013	The Hardy Bucks Movie	Mike Cockayne	Martin Malony, Owen Colgan, Chris Tordoff, Peter Cassidy, Tom Kilgallon	Comedy	
2013	How to Be Happy	Michael Rob Costine, Mark Gaster	Brian Gleeson, Gemma-Leah Devereux	Comedy	
2013	What If	Michael Dowse	Daniel Radcliffe, Zoe Kazan, Adam Driver, Megan Park, Mackenzie Davis, Rafe Spall	Comedy	Co-produced with Canada
2013	The Irish Pub	Alex Fegan	Paul Gartlan, Liam Ahern, Ray Blackwell	Documentary	
2013	The Stag	John Butler	Andrew Scott, Hugh O'Conor, Peter McDonald & Brian Gleeson	Comedy	
2013	Eliza Lynch: Queen of Paraguay	Alan Gilsenan	Maria Doyle Kennedy, Leryn Franco	Documentary, Biography	
2014	From the Dark	Conor McMahon	Niamh Algar, Stephen Cromwell, Ged Murray	Horror	
2014	Calvary	John Michael McDonagh	Brendan Gleeson, Chris O'Dowd, Kelly Reilly, Aidan Gillen, Dylan Moran, Isaach de Bankolé, M. Emmet Walsh, Marie-Josée Croze, Domhnall Gleeson	Drama	Co-produced with United Kingdom
2014	Frank	Lenny Abrahamson	Domhnall Gleeson, Maggie Gyllenhaal, Scoot McNairy, Michael Fassbender, Carla Azar, François Civil	Comedy	Co-produced with United Kingdom
2014	The Gift	Tom Collins	Michelle Beamish, Ciarán Charles, John Finn	Drama, Thriller	
2014	The Guarantee	Ian Power	David Murray, Gary Lydon, Orla Fitzgerald, Morgan C. Jones, Peter Coonan	Drama	Film about the Irish banking crisis
2014	Patrick's Day	Terry McMahon	Kerry Fox, Moe Dunford, Catherine Walker, Philip Jackson	Psychological Drama	
2014	Song of the Sea	Tomm Moore	David Rawle, Brendan Gleeson, Fionnuala Flanagan, Lisa Hanningon, Lucy O' Connell	Animation, Fantasy	Co-produced with Belgium, Denmark, France and Luxembourg
2014	Standby	Ronan Burke, Rob Burke	Jessica Paré, Brian Gleeson	Romantic Comedy	
2015	Brooklyn	John Crowley	Saoirse Ronan, Domhnall Gleeson, Emory Cohen, Jim Broadbent, Julie Walters	Drama	Co-produced with United Kingdom and Canada
2015	The Lobster	Yorgos Lanthimos	Colin Farrell, Rachel Weisz	Comedy, Drama	Co-produced with United Kingdom, Greece, France and Netherlands
2015	My Name is Emily	Simon Fitzmaurice	Evanna Lynch, George Webster, Michael Smiley	Drama	
2015	Night People	Gerard Lough	Michael Parle, Jack Dean Shepherd, Claire Blennerhassett	Horror, Science Fiction	
2015	Room	Lenny Abrahamson	Brie Larson, Jacob Tremblay, Joan Allen, Sean Bridgers, William H. Macy	Drama	Co-produced with Canada, United Kingdom and United States
2016	A Dark Song	Liam Gavin	Steve Oram, Catherine Walker	Horror	Co-produced with United Kingdom
2016	A Date for Mad Mary	Darren Thornton	Seána Kerslake, Tara Lee, Charleigh Bailey, Denise McCormack	Drama	
2016	Dead Along the Way	Maurice O'Connell	Niall Murphy, Ciaran Bermingham	Comedy	
2016	Ellie	Dean Mullen		Drama	
2016	Handsome Devil	John Butler	Fionn O'Shea, Nicholas Galitzine, Andrew Scott	Coming-of-age, Comedy-drama	
2016	I Am Not a Serial Killer	Billy O'Brien	Laura Fraser, Max Records, Christopher Lloyd	Thriller	Co-produced with United Kingdom
2016	The Journey	Nick Hamm	Timothy Spall, Colm Meaney, Toby Stephens	Drama	Co-produced with United Kingdom
2016	Mammal	Rebecca Daly	Rachel Griffiths, Michael McElhatton, Barry Keoghan, Danika McGuigan, Johnny Ward, Joanne Crawford	Drama	Co-produced with Luxembourg and Netherlands
2016	The Siege of Jadotville	Richie Smyth	Jamie Dornan, Mark Strong, Mikael Persbrandt and Jason O'Mara		Co-produced with South Africa
2016	Sing Street	John Carney	Ferdia Walsh-Peelo, Lucy Boynton, Jack Reynor, Aidan Gillen	Musical, Comedy-drama	Co-produced with United States and United Kingdom
2016	The Young Offenders	Peter Foott	Alex Murphy, Chris Walley	Comedy	
2017	Michael Inside	Frank Berry	Dafhyd Flynn, Moe Dunford	Drama	
2017	Cardboard Gangsters	Mark O'Connor	John Connors	Drama	
2017	Bad Day For The Cut	Chris Baugh	Nigel O'Neill, Susan Lynch, Józef Pawlowski, Stuart Graham	Crime, Drama, Thriller	
2017	Kissing Candice	Aoife McArdle	Ann Skelly	Drama	
2017	The Lodgers	Brian O'Malley	Charlotte Vega, Bill Milner	Horror	
2017	The Cured	David Freyne	Elliot Page, Sam Keeley, Tom Vaughan-Lawlor	Horror	Co-produced with France, United Kingdom and United States
2017	Soulsmith	Kevin Henry	Matthew O'Brien, Miriam Devitt, Brian Fortune	Drama	
2017	The Killing of a Sacred Deer	Yorgos Lanthimos	Colin Farrell, Nicole Kidman, Barry Keoghan	Psychological thriller	Co-produced with United Kingdom
2018	Float Like a Butterfly	Carmel Winters	Hazel Doupe	Drama	
2018	Rosie	Paddy Breathnach	Sarah Greene	Drama	
2018	The Devil's Doorway	Aislinn Clarke	Lalor Roddy, Ciaran Flynn, Helena Bereen	Horror	Co-produced with United Kingdom
2018	The Dig	Andy Tohill and Ryan Tohill	Moe Dunford	Thriller	Co-produced with United Kingdom
2018	The Delinquent Season	Mark O'Rowe	Cillian Murphy, Eva Birthistle	Drama	
2018	Dublin Oldschool	Dave Tynan	Emmet Kirwan, Ian Lloyd Anderson	Drama	
2018	The Favourite	Yorgos Lanthimos	Olivia Colman, Emma Stone, Rachel Weisz	Comedy, Drama	Co-produced with United Kingdom and United States
2018	Black '47	Lance Daly	Hugo Weaving, James Frecheville, Jim Broadbent, Stephen Rea, Freddie Fox, Moe Dunford, Barry Keoghan, Sarah Greene	Period Drama	Co-produced with Luxembourg
2018	Papi Chulo	John Butler	Matt Bomer, Alejandro Patino, Elena Campbell-Martinez, Wendi McLendon-Covey	Comedy, Drama	Co-produced with United Kingdom
2019	A Bump Along the Way	Shelly Love	Bronagh Gallagher, Lola Petticrew, Mary Moulds, Dan Gordon, Zara Devlin	Comedy-drama	Co-produced with United Kingdom
2019	The Hole in the Ground	Lee Cronin	Seána Kerslake, James Cosmo, James Quinn Markey	Horror	Co-produced with Belgium, Finland and United Kingdom
2019	Extra Ordinary	Mike Ahern, Enda Loughman	Maeve Higgins, Barry Ward, Will Forte, Claudia O'Doherty	Comedy, Horror	Co-produced with Belgium, Finland and United Kingdom
2019	Vivarium	Lorcan Finnegan	Imogen Poots, Jesse Eisenberg	Science Fiction, Thriller	Co-produced with Belgium and Denmark
2019	Arracht	Tomás Ó Súilleabháin	Dónall Ó Héalaí, Saise Ní Chuinn	Historical Drama	
2019	Rialto	Peter Mackie Burns	Tom Vaughan-Lawlor, Tom Glynn-Carney	Drama	Co-produced with United Kingdom
2019	Sea Fever	Neasa Hardiman	Hermione Corfield, Dougray Scott, Connie Nielsen	Science Fiction, Horror	Co-produced with Sweden, Belgium and United Kingdom
2019	Never Grow Old	Ivan Kavanagh	Emile Hirsch, John Cusack, Deborah Francois	Western	Co-produced with Luxembourg, Belgium and France
2019	Calm with Horses	Nick Rowland	Cosmo Jarvis, Barry Keoghan, Niamh Algar, Ned Dennehy	Crime Drama	Co-produced with United Kingdom

== 2020s ==
Year	Title	Director	Actors	Genre	Comments
2021	Deadly Cuts	Rachel Carey	Angeline Ball, Ericka Roe, Shauna Higgins, Lauren Larkin, Victoria Smurfit, Aidan McArdle, Thommas Kane Byrne	Comedy	
2021	You Are Not My Mother	Kate Dolan	Hazel Doupe, Carolyn Bracken, Irene Craigie, Paul Reid	Psychological Horror	
2021	The Green Sea	Randall Plunkett		Fantasy	
2021	My Little Pony: A New Generation	Robert Cullen, José L. Ucha	Vanessa Hudgens, Kimiko Glenn, James Marsden, Sofia Carson, Liza Koshy, Ken Jeong, Elizabeth Perkins, Jane Krakowski, Phil LaMarr, Michael McKean	Adventure Comedy	Co-produced with the US and Canada
2022	The Quiet Girl	Colm Bairéad	Drama		
2022	Spears	Gerard Lough	Aidan O'Sullivan, Bobby Calloway, Nigel Brennan	Mystery / thriller	
2022	Wendell & Wild	Henry Selick	Keegan-Michael Key, Jordan Peele, Angela Bassett, Lyric Ross, Ving Rhames, James Hong	Stop motion-animated horror comedy	
2023	That They May Face the Rising Sun	Pat Collins	Barry Ward, Anna Bederke	Drama	Adaptation of the novel by John McGahern
2023	All You Need Is Death	Paul Duane		Horror	
2023	The Martini Shot	Stephen Wallis	Matthew Modine, Derek Jacobi, John Cleese, Stuart Townsend, Fiona Glascott	Drama	Ireland-Canada co-production; premiered at Galway Film Fleadh

== See also ==
- Cinema of Ireland
- Category:Films shot in Ireland
- Category:Irish-language films
- Cinema of Northern Ireland
- List of films set in Ireland
- List of films set in Northern Ireland
