= Mark O'Connor (director) =

Biography of the Irish film director Mark O'Connor

Mark O’Connor
- Born: Dublin, Ireland
- Education: Ballyfermot College of Further Education, The New York Film Academy, IADT.
- Occupation: Film Director
- Years active: 2000-Present
- Known for: Cardboard Gangsters, Between the Canals, Amongst the Wolves, King of the Travellers, Stalker
- Television: Darklands

Mark O’Connor is an Irish film director. He has been credited with giving several Irish actors their first "break", including Barry Keoghan, John Connors, Stephen Clinch and Peter Coonan.

== Early life and education ==
O’Connor was born in Dublin, Ireland. He graduated from Ballyfermot College of Further Education, New York Film Academy, and has a masters in screenwriting from IADT.

== Career ==
O’Connor released his first feature film in 2011 with Between the Canals. O’Connor revealed he had originally been denied funding for the film, but later got it when he shot a short scene and showed it to the Irish Screen Board.

O’Connor released his second feature film King of the Travellers in 2012. The film was also the on-screen debut of John Connors. That same year, he released his third feature film Stalker, which was Barry Keoghan's first leading role.

In 2017, O’Connor released Cardboard Gangsters. The film won international praise, with The Guardian calling it a “punchy thriller” and became the most watched Irish film of that year.

In 2019, O’Connor directed the crime series Darklands. The series was originally planned to have a season 2, with O’Connor returning, but he confirmed in 2025 that the second season had been cancelled.

In 2022, it was announced that O’Connor was using crypto to fund his next feature Oui Cannes, making him the first Irish filmmaker to do so.

In 2024, O’Connor released his fifth feature film Amongst the Wolves.

== Awards ==
In 2011, O’Connor's Between the Canals won 9th place for Best Irish Feature film at the Dublin International Film Festival.

In 2012, O’Connor's Stalker won 2nd place for Best Irish Feature at the Galway Film Fleadh.

In 2017, O’Connor won the award for Outstanding Achievement in Filmmaking at the Newport International Film Festival for Cardboard Gangsters.

In 2017, O’Connor won four awards at the Manchester International Film Festival (Outstanding Screenplay, Best Director, Film of the Festival and Outstanding Director) for Cardboard Gangsters.

In 2018, O’Connor was nominated for Best Director at the Irish Film and Television Awards for Cardboard Gangsters.

In 2020, O’Connor was nominated for Best Script Drama at the Irish Film and Television Awards for Darklands.

== Filmography ==
=== Director ===
- 2000: Action Sequence
- 2005: Dead Samurai
- 2011: Between the Canals
- 2012: Stalker
- 2012: King of the Travellers
- 2017: Cardboard Gangsters
- 2019: Darklands
- 2024: Amongst the Wolves
- Upcoming: Oui Cannes
- Upcoming: Soldier for a Summer

=== Writer ===
- 2000: Action Sequence
- 2005: Dead Samurai
- 2011: Between the Canals
- 2012: Stalker
- 2012: King of the Travellers
- 2017: Cardboard Gangsters
- 2019: Darklands
- 2024: Amongst the Wolves

=== Producer ===
- 2000: Action Sequence
- 2011: Between the Canals
- 2012: King of the Travellers
- 2013: Out of Here
- 2014: Calvary
- Upcoming: Tranzient
