= Get Up and Go =

Get Up and Go may refer to:

- A folk song first recorded by The Weavers and then Pete Seeger
- A song by Cinerama on Torino (album)
- A song by the Go-Go's on Vacation (The Go-Go's album)
- A song by The Rutles
- Get Up and Go!, a 1981–1983 British children's television series
- Get Up & Go, a 2014 Irish dramedy film starring Killian Scott, Peter Coonan, and Gemma-Leah Devereux
- Another name for the Timed Up and Go test, a medical test used to evaluate a patient's abilities to perform activities of daily living
