= Darklands (TV series) =

2019 Irish crime drama series

- Darklands 2019 Television Series poster
- Genre: Crime Drama
- Created by: Adam Coates; Mark O’Connor
- Directed by: Mark O’Connor; Conor McMahon
- Starring: Dane Whyte O’Hara; Thommas Kane Byrne; Alisha Weir; Jimmy Smallhorne
- Country of origin: Ireland
- Original language: English
- No. of seasons: 1
- No. of episodes: 6

Original release
- Network: Virgin Media One
- Release: 7 October – 11 November 2019

Darklands is a 2019 Irish crime drama, produced by Virgin Media One. It was written by Adam Coates and created and directed by Cardboard Gangsters director Mark O'Connor.

== Plot ==
A young MMA fighter with dreams of escaping his tough neighborhood is drawn into a dangerous world of drug gangs and violence when his brother goes missing.

== Cast ==
- Dane Whyte O’Hara as Damian
- Thommas Kane Byrne as Butsy
- Jimmy Smallhorne as Jim
- Judith Roddy as Bernie
- Mark O'Halloran as Paddy
- Luke McQuillan as Eric
- Alisha Weir as Laura
- Stephen Clinch as Bernard

== Production ==
The co-writer, Adam Coates, based the story off the real life murder of his brother, Shane Coates, who was a leader of The Westies. director Mark O'Connor joined the project, and helped Coates with the screenplay. O’Connor revealed in an interview that he based the screenplay off a real life murder of a man the day before he was meant to film Between the Canals in that same location.

== Critical response ==
Peter Crawley of The Irish Times said that "Darklands is pulse-racingly impressive. Mark O'Connor's crime saga brings enough kinetic energy, local swagger and raw atmosphere to prove there is still plenty of life in the Dublin gangland drama."

Darragh McManus of Irish Independent said that "There is enough energy, grit, and quality to suggest Darklands could grow into a serious hit. It certainly earns its place on the screen."

== Cancellation ==
A second season of the series had been in talks since 2019. However, it was announced in 2025 that the show would not be renewed, as it was felt the first season had wrapped up the story nicely.
