= Michael Collins (Irish actor) =

Irish actor

- Born: 1966 (age 59–60); Westmeath, Ireland
- Education: Gaiety School of Acting
- Occupation: Actor
- Years active: 1989-present
- Known for: Love/Hate King of the Travellers Glenroe

Michael Collins is an Irish actor, awarded a lifetime achievement award in 2011 for his contribution and work around Travellers' rights.

== Early life ==
Collins spent most of his early life travelling around Offaly and Kildare with his family, often having to beg for scraps from households or take whatever they could find on the side of the road. The family would move into a halting site in Dublin in the 70’s where they’d stay for 20 years before moving into a mobile in Cavan. In 1985, Collins began acting when playwright Anton O’Flaherty, asked him to play a “Young Teddy Boy character called Rocky” In his play about Irish Travellers. Collins loved the idea so much, he said yes immediately. He started learning about education in theatre at TEAM Educational Theatre Company in 1988 and took acting lessons at the Gaiety School of Acting in 1992.

== Traveller Activism & Theatre/Film Career ==
Collins has always been heavily involved in Traveller Activism. In 2012, Collins spoke about the discrimination he faced during a wrap party in a bar in Dublin with the cast and crew of King of the Travellers, where he was denied entry to said bar, due to his Traveller heritage. Collins claimed this was a normal occurrence for Irish Travellers and praised fellow actor Peter Coonan for defending him.

Following the 2015 Carrickmines fire accident in Dublin, Ireland, Collins expressed his feelings on the situation, saying he was ‘weary and angry’ over the incident. In 2016, he released the play 'Ireland Shed a Tear?' Which was a fictional storytelling for the aftermath of the fires. Michael spoke openly of his disapproval of how the situation had been handled, saying "These people shouldn't be forgotten and the way they were treated by Irish society and the Government is an Irish shame. I would call it an Irish shame.” The play was produced as part of Dublin Theatre Festival 2016.

In 2005, Michael wrote the play ‘It's a Cultural Thing, or is it? - A Traveller in progress', a play based around his real life experiences as an Irish Traveller. He performed the play for five years across venues in both Ireland and the UK.

In 2010, Collins wrote the play 'Worlds Apart' about the new communities in Ireland, and a young Traveller woman leaving her husband because of domestic violence. Collins is also frequently involved with Traveller Wagon Wheel Theatre Company, receiving an award from Social Entrepreneurs Ireland in recognition of his work with them in 2006.

In 2022, Collins worked alongside researchers at TravAct in Coolock and Pavee Point Traveller and Roma Centre to create a map of traditional traveller spots in Coolock. As part of the Traveller Pride celebrations in 2021, Collins filmed his reading of his poem ‘A Dignified Life’ Which explored the topics of culture, identity and discrimination experienced by members of the Travelling community. The project was supported by The Department of Children, Equality, Disability, Integration and Youth.

Collins brought his one man play ‘Magpies on the Pylon’ to life in 2025, performing it in Kilkenny. The play is set in a tiny bedroom belonging to Jim, a Traveller father who struggles to cope with the suicide of his 23-year-old son.

== Filmography ==
Year	Title	Role	Notes
1995	Cruschen On	Patrick O’Connor	
1995–1999	Glenroe	Johnny Connors	3 episodes
1996	Trojan Eddie	2nd Traveller	
2004	Man About Dog	Tiny	
2005	Pavee Lackeen: The Traveller Girl	Uncle Martin	
2007	Strength and Honour	Frankie O’Neill	
2007	Killinaskully	Mikey	Episode: "The Horse Whisperer"
2009	Legend of the Bog	Foreman	
2010	Tome Feenes	Puck	Short
2010	Jack Taylor	Sweeper Mangan	Episode: "Shot Down"
2012	Stalker	Karl	
2012	King of the Travellers	Francis Moorehouse	
2012	Unsettled: From Tinker to Traveller	Self-Narrator	TV Movie
2015	End in Tears	Paddy McCluskey	TV Series
2018	Float Like a Butterfly	Uncle Tommy	
2019	Der Irland-Krimi	Tom Dunne	TV Series
2019	The New Theatre	Self	Short
2022	Agape	Davie	Short
2026	A Traveller Family	Self	Documentary

== Theatre ==
Year	Title	Role	Produced by
1989	The Native Ground	Rocky	TEAM Educational Theatre Company
1994	Sheep's Milk on the Boil	Performer	Abbey Theatre
1998	Bowing and Scraping	Playwright	Fishamble: The New Play Company
2003	She Was Wearing…	Co-Playwright	Indie Production
2005	It's A Cultural Thing, Or Is It?	Playwright	Indie Production
2006	Michael Collins: Mobile	Playwright-Performer	Teachers Club
2007	Stuck	Performer	Project Arts Centre
2010	Same Difference Worlds Apart	Playwright-Performer	Traveller Wagon Wheel Theatre Company
2013	The Boys	Pat	New Theatre, Dublin
2015	Foxy	Performer	Verdant Productions
2018	Father, Soldier, Tinker	Playwright-Performer	Fringe Festival Dublin
2025	Magpies on the Pylon	Playwright-Director-Performer	Indie Production
