= Stephen Clinch =

Irish actor

- Born: Dublin, Ireland
- Died: 24 May 2022
- Occupation: Actor
- Known for: Love/Hate; Cardboard Gangsters

Stephen Clinch was an Irish actor and reformed drug dealer from Dublin, Ireland. He was best known for portraying ‘Noely’ in the hit Irish Series Love/Hate and for supporting roles in the Irish features Between the Canals, King of the Travellers, the television series Darklands and the critically praised Cardboard Gangsters. In 2014, he starred in the short Documentary ‘Rebirth: The Story of Stephen Clinch’ which showcased how his transformation from a heroin addict and former inmate to an actor.

== Arrest ==
Stephen Clinch was arrested in 2016 for attempting to rob €50,000 for a hotel bar. It was said Clinch had held a loaded semi-automatic pistol to the head of a security worker collecting overnight cash from a bar. The Irish Times stated in an article that Clinch had previously struggled with a heroin addiction and had several previous convictions of robbery dating as far back as 2004. Clinch pleaded guilty to the offences and was sentenced to 4 ½ years in prison. Though Stephen would be released from prison early on bail in 2019 While serving his sentence inside Mountjoy Prison he joined the prison choir, stating it was a new hobby.

== Death ==
On the 24th of May, 2022, Irish News announced that Stephen Clinch had suddenly passed away of a heart-attack at the age of 52.

Many of Stephen’s filmmaking peers sent in tributes. King of the Travellers director Mark O'Connor stated that Clinch was ‘an incredible actor’ and noted how he was the only actor to appear in all of O’Connor’s films. His Love/Hate co-star Peter Coonan said that ‘there was never a dull moment’ with Clinch. His Darklands co-star Robbie Breen said that Clinch was a character ‘on and off the set’.

The funeral took place in the Church of Our Lady Immaculate in Darndale. His family had stressed that they would like him to be remembered for the youth work he did in the community, saying Clinch had warned many young people about the dangers of addiction. Cardboard Gangsters co-star John Connors gave a speech at the funeral, saying that Clinch ‘actually never acted a day in his life, he was real’.

== Filmography ==
Year	Title	Character	Notes
2011	Between the Canals	Limbo	Feature
2012	Stalker	Sausage	Feature
2012	King of the Travellers	Scully	Feature
2014	Jack and Ralph Plan a Murder	Pato	Feature
2014	Rebirth: The Story of Stephen Clinch	Self	Short Documentary
2013-2014	Love/Hate	Noely	TV Series
2015	These Dog Days	Man with Dog	Feature
2016	Solid	Darren	Short
2017	Cardboard Gangsters	Ross Kelly	Feature
2017	The Legend of Harry and Ambrose	Paddy Mc Paddyman	Feature
2019	Darklands	Bernard	TV Series
2022	Creep Hunters	Steven	Short
2022	The Black Guelph	Drug Dealer	Feature
