= Penance (2018 film) =

Irish period drama film

- DVD cover
- Directed by: Tom Collins
- Screenplay by: Tom Collins; Greg O'Braonain
- Based on: "Seacht mBua an Éirí Amach" by Pádraic Ó Conaire
- Produced by: Tom Collins; Edwina Forkin
- Starring: Peter Coonan; Gerard McSorley; Barry McGovern
- Cinematography: Ciarán Tanham
- Edited by: Dermot Diskin
- Music by: Pól Brennan
- Production companies: De Facto Films; Zanzibar Films
- Distributed by: Starline Entertainment
- Release date: 1 May 2018
- Running time: 84 minutes
- Countries: Ireland; United Kingdom
- Languages: Irish; English

Penance (Irish: Aithrí) is a 2018 historical drama film directed by Tom Collins and set in Ulster during 1916 and 1969. It stars Peter Coonan as an Irish nationalist Catholic priest who recruits a boy to the cause, only to regret his actions decades later.

== Production ==
Penance was filmed in Ramelton, County Donegal and Derry, Northern Ireland and is primarily in the Irish language. Filming in Derry took place at St Columba's Church, Long Tower, on Bishop Street and Society Street, as those areas had changed little since the 1960s.

It was based on the Pádraic Ó Conaire story "Seacht mBua an Éirí Amach" ("Seven Virtues of the [Easter] Rising").

Production was financed by TG4, the Broadcasting Authority of Ireland, the Irish Film Board (€150,000), the Irish Language Broadcast Fund, Northern Ireland Screen and Section 481.

== Plot ==
Derry, 1969. Catholic priest Fr. Eoin McDonnell prevents the arrest of Antaine, a senior Irish Republican Army commandant. Fr. Eoin casts his mind back to rural County Donegal in 1916, when he recruited a teenage Antaine into the Irish independence movement.

== Cast ==
=== 1916 ===
- Peter Coonan as Fr. Eoin McDonnell (young)
- Padhraig Parkinson as Antaine (young)
- Barry Barnes as Inspector Joyce
- Mimi Carroll as Mairéad
- Diona Doherty as Ellie Nic Shiubhlaigh
- Dara Devaney as Peadar

=== 1969 ===
- Terry Byrne as Fr. Eoin McDonnell (old)
- Gerard McSorley as Murray
- Barry McGovern as Antaine (old)
- Corey McKinley as Feidhlím

== Release ==
Penance was released on 1 May 2018.

The film received its TV premiere on TG4 on 20 April 2019.
