= The Black Guelph =

2022 Irish film

- Film Poster
- Directed by: John Connors
- Written by: John Connors; Tiernan Williams
- Produced by: Maria O'Neill; Tiernan Williams
- Starring: Graham Earley; Barry John Kinsella; Denise McCormack; Tony Doyle; John Connors; Gemma-Leah Devereux
- Cinematography: Carl Quinn
- Edited by: Tiernan Williams
- Release dates: September 16, 2022 (Oldenburg); March 23, 2023 (Dublin); June 7, 2024 (Ireland)
- Running time: 120 mins.
- Country: Ireland
- Language: English

The Black Guelph is a 2022 Irish drama film, directed by John Connors, who also co-stars and co-wrote with editor Tiernan Williams. It stars Graham Earley, Barry John Kinsella, Denise McCormack, Tony Doyle, Stephen Clinch and Gemma-Leah Devereux. It premiered at the Oldenburg International Film Festival in 2022, before being released in Ireland and the USA in 2024.

== Synopsis ==
About Canto, a small time drug dealer trying to get off the streets, whose long absent father Cormac, an industrial school survivor, returns home looking for forgiveness and reconciliation.

== Cast ==
- Graham Earley as Canto
- Barry John Kinsella as Cormac
- Denise McCormack as Beatrice
- Tony Doyle as Virgil
- Lauren Larkin as Leah
- Paul Roe as Dan
- John Connors as Ryan
- Gemma-Leah Devereux as Jenny
- Casey Walsh as Jaya
- Kevin Glynn as Father Peter

== Reception ==
On the review aggregator website Rotten Tomatoes, 90% of 10 critics' reviews are positive, with an average rating of 7.90/10. Metacritic, which uses a weighted average, assigned the film a score of 76 out of 100, based on 4 critics, indicating "generally favorable" reviews.

John DeFore of The Hollywood Reporter says, "Intriguing characters and elements of crime fiction prevent the film from being a dour slog", in a mostly positive review. Wendy Ide of Screen Daily lauds the "fiercely authentic portrait of Ireland's underclass". Stephen Dalton of The Film Verdict compliments writer/director John Connors for making "a powerful statement with his…gritty crime thriller".

Dale Kearney of Film Ireland praises the performances, particularly those of Graham Earley and Paul Roe, the latter of whom he says gives "a totally devastating" turn. Olly Dyche of MovieWeb praises the film for being "A devastating and impactful drama". And Alton Barnhart of SLUG states that the film's one problem is that it "doesn't know what kind" of film it wants to be.
