= The Westies (Irish gang) =

Criminal organization in Dublin, Ireland

- Named after: West Dublin
- Founding location: Blanchardstown, Dublin, Ireland
- Years active: Late 1990s - early 2000s
- Territory: Dublin, Ireland
- Leaders: Shane Coates, Stephen Sugg, Bernard 'Verb' Sugg, Andrew Glennon, Mark Glennon
- Activities: Drug trafficking (heroin), armed robbery, extortion

The Westies was the name given by the Irish media to a criminal gang based in Blanchardstown, west Dublin, Ireland.

They controlled the heroin trade in west Dublin in the late 90s and early 2000s and were known for their extreme violence against drug addicts and rival drug dealers. The gang, who were also involved in armed robberies and extortion, imploded after the murders of all of its leaders.

== Leaders ==
=== Shane Coates ===
Shane Julian Coates (1972 – 2004) was from Willowood Grove in Clonsilla. One of eleven children from a respectable Dublin family, Coates had been involved in crime from a young age, and in 1990 was sentenced to two years jail for stealing a van and damaging a Garda car with it. In 1994, Coates survived an attempt on his life after he was shot in the stomach while drinking in the Mountview Inn in Clonsilla. Coates was considered to be the leader of the Westies, and due to his psychopathic tendencies was dubbed "The New Psycho" by the Sunday World. He was a bodybuilding enthusiast who very rarely drank alcohol. Coates became a father in 1994. The 2019 Irish crime television series, Darklands, was written by his younger brother, Adam Coates, who based the show loosly off Shane’s criminal history and death.

=== Stephen Sugg ===
Stephen Sugg (1977 – 2004) was from the Corduff estate in Blanchardstown. A friend of Coates since youth, the pair began their criminal careers together, initially robbing cars but later graduating to armed robberies. By 1990, the pair had a lengthy criminal record. As recalled by a former associate, Sugg was very much the second-in-command in the criminal gang; "Coates led Sugg around by the nose. Without Coates, Sugg was nothing."

=== Bernard Sugg ===
Bernard "Verb" Sugg (1980 – 2003) was the younger brother of Stephen Sugg. Considered the gang's enforcer, the younger Sugg was said to have a reputation as a violent thug.

== Deaths ==
Bernard 'Verb' Sugg (23) was shot dead by two masked men in a pub in Blanchardstown in August 2003. Shane Coates (31) and Stephen Sugg (27) went missing in Spain in 2004. Their bodies were found buried under concrete in a warehouse near Alicante in July 2006. Both had been shot in the head. Spanish police suspect they were killed after crossing another group of Irish gangsters based in Spain. Coates had fled to Spain after being injured in a shoot-out with Gardaí in Cavan in 2003. In April 2005, Andrew Glennon (30) was shot dead after being ambushed by at least four gunmen near his home in Clonee. His brother Mark (32) was shot dead outside his home in Blanchardstown by a lone gunman five months later.
