= Thommas Kane Byrne =

Irish actor and playwright

- Born: Dublin, Ireland
- Education: Gaiety School of Acting
- Occupations: Actor, playwright
- Years active: 2012–present

Thommas Kane Byrne is an Irish actor and playwright.

== Early life and education ==
Byrne was born to a working-class family in the inner city of northern Dublin, which he has said lacked access to "cultural spaces". Byrne was diagnosed with ADHD at a young age and suffered from anxiety for many years. He attended secondary school at Larkin Community College and also attended the Gaiety School of Acting.

== Career ==
Byrne first appeared in the Irish horror comedy film Stitches and also had minor roles in Derry Girls, Deadly Cuts, The Gone, How to Get to Heaven from Belfast, and The Night Caller. In 2019, he was cast in the crime series Darklands as Butsy.

In 2020, he appeared in the RTÉ series Dead Still. He appeared in another Irish crime series Kin in 2021.

Byrne set up the theatre group Breadline in 2018, alongside Erika Roe. His plays primarily focus on working-class Dublin communities. His scripts have included Say Nothin' to No One, which was shortlisted for the 2017 Stewart Parker Trust Awards, Well That's What I Heard, and It's Always Your Bleedin' Own at the Project Arts Centre. In 2026, he was a guest on The Tommy Tiernan Show.

== Filmography ==
- 2012: Stitches as Bulger
- 2012: Tim's Tactical Tips as The Actor
- 2018-2019: MACE-Johnny Sexton as Tom
- 2019: Darklands as Butsy
- 2020: Dead Still as Bertie Mulgrew
- 2021: Deadly Cuts as Kevin
- 2021: Kin as Francis 'Fudge' Flynn
- 2021: Cherry as Performer
- 2021: Royals Next Door as Snowy
- 2022: Derry Girls as Fintan
- 2022: Glitterbug as Coco
- 2023: The Gone as Shamie
- 2024: Deadly Cuts as Kevin
- 2024: The Dry as Billy
- 2024: The Night Caller as Jed
- 2025: Showkids as Dallan
- 2026: How to Get to Heaven from Belfast as Nurse Bosco Dunne

== Stage Credits ==
=== Actor ===
- 2018: Say Nothin' to No One
- 2018: The Fattest Dancer at St. Bernadette's
- 2019: Dublin Will Show You How
- 2019: The Haircut
- 2023: Hothouse
- 2024: It's Always Your Bleedin' Own
- 2025: Poor
- 2026: Dublin Gothic

=== Playwright ===
- 2017: Say Nothin' to No One
- 2018: Well That's What I Heard
- 2018: The Fattest Dancer at St. Bernadette's
- 2024: It's Always Your Bleedin' Own
