= Amongst the Wolves =

2024 Irish film

- Directed by: Mark O'Connor
- Screenplay by: Mark O'Connor; Luke McQuillan
- Produced by: Paul 'Tall Order' Richie; Jeff O'Toole; Andrew Keogh; Dean Scurry
- Starring: Aidan Gillen; Luke McQuillan; Ben Condron; Jade Jordan; Peter Coonan; Paul 'Tall Order' Richie
- Cinematography: Ignas Laugalis
- Edited by: Eoin McDonagh
- Music by: Jamal Green
- Production company: Stalker Films
- Distributed by: Wildcard Distribution
- Release dates: 2024 (Galway Film Fleadh); 11 July 2025
- Running time: 102 minutes
- Country: Ireland
- Language: English

Amongst the Wolves in a 2024 Irish crime drama film, written and directed by Mark O'Connor and starring Aidan Gillen, Jade Jordan, and Peter Coonan.

== Plot ==
Danny, an ex-soldier homeless in Dublin, meets Will, a teen fleeing a drug gang. Their encounter forces them to confront their pasts while navigating the harsh realities they face.

== Cast ==
- Luke McQuillan as Danny
- Aidan Gillen as Power
- Daniel Fee as Will
- Manco O'Connor as Tadgh
- Jade Jordan as Gill
- Paul 'Tall Order' Richie as Paul
- Peter Coonan as Judge

== Production ==
Filming began in 2024, being shot over 15 days in Dublin, on a budget of €16,000. Aidan Gillen took a pay cut for the film, wanting to be involved to help younger actors.

== Release ==
Wildcard Distribution released a trailer for the film in March with of the film set to release in Irish cinemas 2nd of May 2025. The film premiered in the United Kingdom at the Manchester Film Festival. It was released on digital platforms in June.

== Critical reception ==
The film had mixed reviews. One critic referred to it as a "western show down in Dublin", praising the performances of the upcoming actors and clever use of small budget. The Irish Times spoke fondly of O'Connor, calling him a "14 year veteran" and claiming the film was a deep look into a "rawer Ireland" granting it 3 1/2 stars. The Independent gave the film poor reviews calling the script "poorly written" and stating it "fails to stand out of the pack". The film holds a rating of 87% on Rotten Tomatoes.
