= Stitches (2012 film) =

2012 comedy slasher film by Conor McMahon

- Theatrical movie poster
- Directed by: Conor McMahon
- Written by: Conor McMahon; David O' Brien
- Produced by: Julianne Forde; Brendan McCarthy; John McDonnell; Ruth Treacy
- Starring: Tommy Knight; Ross Noble; Gemma-Leah Devereux; Shane Murray Corcoran; Thommas Kane Byrne; Eoghan McQuinn; Roisin Barron; Hugh Mulhern; John McDonnell; Tommy Cullen; Lorna Dempsey; Jemma Curran
- Cinematography: Patrick Jordan
- Edited by: Chris Gill
- Music by: Paul McDonnell
- Production companies: Fantastic Films; Tailored Films; Solid Entertainment
- Distributed by: Eclipse Pictures (Ireland); Signature Entertainment (United Kingdom)
- Release date: 26 October 2012 (UK)
- Running time: 86 minutes
- Countries: Ireland; Sweden; United Kingdom
- Language: English
- Budget: $2,000,000
- Box office: $63,555

Stitches is a 2012 comedy slasher film directed by Conor McMahon and written by McMahon and David O'Brien. It stars Ross Noble, Tommy Knight and Gemma-Leah Devereux, with Shane Murray Corcoran, Thommas Kane Byrne, Eoghan McQuinn, Roisin Barron, Hugh Mulhern, John McDonnell, Tommy Cullen, Lorna Dempsey, Jemma Curran, and Ryan Burke in supporting roles. The plot concerns a young man dressed as a birthday clown returning from the dead to exact revenge upon a boy and a group of children/teenagers who contributed to his death.

The film was produced by Fantastic Films and Tailored Films in 2012 and marks the film debut of Tommy Knight and stand-up comedian Ross Noble.

The film is an international co-production between Ireland, Sweden, and the United Kingdom. McMahon began working on the film after receiving a €600,000 grant from the Irish Film Board, also utilising funding from MEDIA Europe. Filming for the movie took place in Ireland.

Stitches premiered in Dublin, Ireland in September 2012 and was theatrically released in the United Kingdom on 26 October 2012.

== Plot ==
Richard Grindle, a clown with the stage name "Stitches", is having sex with a woman in his camper. During intercourse, she notices an egg encased in a glass tube with a face painted on it. Stitches explains that "they" made him do it when he signed up. Stitches arrives late at Tommy's tenth birthday party. He attempts to entertain the children, but they instead ridicule him. Tommy's best friend Vinnie ties Stitches' shoelaces together, and Tommy throws a soccer ball on his face, causing him to trip and land on a kitchen knife on the other side of the room, unseen to the children, which penetrates his face. As the children come to find out, Stitches slowly gets up, revealing the knife lodged in his eye. Seeing him, all of the kids scream in terror and run away. However, Tommy stays; when Stitches removes the knife, blood gushes out of his head. After it stops bleeding, he attempts to stab Tommy, only to slip on a puddle of blood. Stitches falls on the floor as the knife falls into his eye a second time, killing him. Tommy visits Stitches' grave to put a squeaky flower on top, only to find a group of clowns entering an abandoned building. Tommy enters the building to find the clowns performing a ritual with Stitches' egg. One member discovers Tommy and brings him to the cult's leader, The Motley. The Motley warns Tommy that a clown who dies without finishing the party will never rest in peace, and a joke is not as funny the second time.

Six years later, Tommy is preparing for his sixteenth birthday. He is still haunted by the memory of his past birthday, and begins to have frightening hallucinations, such as a teacher turning into a clown and ripping off Vinnie's genitals before tying them to a party balloon. Hesitating at the idea of throwing a large party, he considers instead inviting only a few friends. Ultimately, he settles on a large gathering, and Vinnie secretly distributes many more invitations over the Internet. Tommy, Vinnie, Richie and Bulger, all of whom had been present when Stitches died, prepare the house. As the guests, including Tommy's childhood crush Kate, arrive for the party, Stitches comes back to life and leaves his grave.

Tommy, startled by Paul dressed as a clown, injures his head. Bulger goes to find Tommy a first-aid kit, while Tommy retreats to his treehouse followed by Kate. There, Tommy discusses his memories of the ritual he had encountered as a child. Meanwhile, Paul is attacked by Stitches, who rips off his ear and one of his arms and pulls a live rabbit out of his throat before kicking his head off. The clown then finds Bulger, opens up his skull with a can opener, and removes his brain with an ice cream scooper. Sarah, Paul's girlfriend, enters the attic to look for him. There, she is attacked by Stitches, and manages to fight back. As she tries to escape, Stitches drives an umbrella through her skull, killing her. Through his telescope, Tommy sees Stitches in the house, and goes to warn Vinnie of his presence, but is at first unsuccessful, due to Vinnie's desire to have sex with a formerly overweight classmate. Tommy tries to warn Kate and the other partygoers, but they don't believe him.

Outside, Stitches attacks Richie. Richie attempts to flee but trips and falls. Stitches rips out his intestines and fashions them into a balloon animal before stabbing him with a bike pump and inflating him. Stitches manages to pump enough air into Richie to cause his head to explode. Vinnie, on discovering Tommy to be telling the truth, attempts to leave, but Stitches attacks them. Tommy stabs him, Vinnie covers him with a blanket, and they escape. Tommy and Vinnie rescue Kate, but Stitches knocks her unconscious as they attempt to escape. Tom tries to resuscitate her, and Vinnie leaves them behind, and Stitches attempts to drown Tommy in a sink that Vinnie had previously vomited in. Kate awakens and throws a knife at Stitches, while Tommy deduces a manner in which to defeat the clown; to kill him, they must destroy the egg he kept in his van. Tommy and Kate, pursued by Stitches, make their way to the den in the graveyard. While hiding, Tommy begins to hiccup, and Kate kisses him in order for him to stay quiet. Tommy searches for Stitches' egg among a collection of them while Kate keeps an eye out for Stitches, but the pair are soon discovered by him.

Stitches has Tommy and Kate cornered and asks the two of them if the look on Tommy’s face watching Kate die or the look on Kate’s face watching Tommy die is funnier. Tommy suggests flipping a coin, heads being Tommy and tails being Kate. Stitches agrees while Vinnie ties his shoelaces together again. Tommy then flips the coin at Stitches, causing him to trip and drop his egg. Tommy then forces Stitches to smash the egg, causing him to explode in a mixture of magic trick supplies and yolk. Six months later, Tommy has moved to a new house and is dating Kate. While the couple are in Tommy's old treehouse, Kate gives Tommy a new telescope, and his old one is positioned to focus on the den in the graveyard, where The Motley pieces Stitches' broken egg back together, implying that he will return.

== Cast ==
- Tommy Knight as Tommy
  - Ryan Burke as Young Tommy, 10 years old
- Ross Noble as Richard "Stitches" Grindle
- Gemma-Leah Devereux as Kate
- Shane Murray Corcoran as Vinnie
- Thommas Kane Byrne as Bulger
- Eoghan McQuinn as Richie
- Roisin Barron as Sarah
- Hugh Mulhern as Paul
- John McDonnell as The Motley
- Tommy Cullen as Dan
- Lorna Dempsey as Mary
- Jemma Curran as Jenny

== Production ==
McMahon began working on Stitches after receiving a €600,000 grant from the Irish Film Board, also utilizing funding from MEDIA Europe. Filming for the movie took place in Ireland.

== Soundtrack ==
The score was composed by Paul McDonnell. "Dream Conjecture" was written and performed by Jonathan van Atom. The film's soundtrack also features the 1986 song "(I Just) Died in Your Arms" by the English rock band Cutting Crew. The party scene also features the song "Funk Epidemic", written by Danny Groenland, Conor Doherty and Ken McCabe and performed by Irish group Mob Fandango.

== Release ==
Stitches premiered in Dublin, Ireland in September 2012. It received a limited theatrical release in the U.S. under the distributor Dark Sky Films, and in Japan under Shochiku. The Japanese title of the film translates as The Dead Clown Goes Mad. In France, the film's title is Dark Clown.

== Reception ==
=== Critical reception ===
Starburst rated it 6/10 stars. Entertainment.ie rated it three stars and commented on the influence of "80s slasher flicks" on the film. Bloody Disgusting wrote that the film was "destined to become a cult classic" and carried "heavy replay value". Dread Central in particular praised the film's kill scenes, calling them "brilliant" and remarking that they were done "with such a rigorous sense of care and detail". Criticisms for the movie revolved around the film being "an incredibly low budget production" and the plot being "nowhere near as fun as it sounds on paper". Screen Daily commented that the "horror stuff is obvious, but staged with showstopping flair and buckets of blood".

== Accolades ==
List of awards and nominations
Award	Category	Nominee	Result
Fright-Fest 2012 and Sitges - Catalan International Film Festival 2012	Best Death and Midnight X-Treme	Conor McMahon (Director) Fantastic Films (production company) Tailored Films (production company) - Conor McMahon	Won
