= Re-creation =

2025 Irish mystery thriller film

- Promotional poster
- Directed by: Jim Sheridan; David Merriman
- Written by: Jim Sheridan; David Merriman
- Produced by: Fabrizio Maltese; Tina O'Reilly
- Starring: Vicky Krieps; Jim Sheridan; Aidan Gillen; Colm Meaney
- Cinematography: Carlo Thiel
- Edited by: Jack Thornton
- Music by: Anna Rice
- Production companies: Hell's Kitchen Films; Joli Rideau Media
- Distributed by: Omniplex Services
- Release dates: 8 June 2025 (Tribeca Film Festival); 3 October 2025 (Ireland)
- Running time: 89 minutes
- Countries: Ireland; Luxembourg
- Languages: English; French

Re-creation is a 2025 mystery thriller film directed by Jim Sheridan and David Merriman. The film is about a jury deliberation of the murder case of French filmmaker Sophie Toscan du Plantier. In depicting the jury's decision the film closely follows the classic movie Twelve Angry Men.

The film had its world premiere at the Tribeca Film Festival on 8 June 2025.

== Cast ==
- Vicky Krieps as Juror 8
- Jim Sheridan as Juror 1
- John Connors as Juror 3
- Brendan Conroy as Juror 7
- Brian Doherty as Juror 10
- Tristan Heanue as Juror 2
- Gilbert K. Johnston as Juror 4
- Maja Juric as Juror 11
- Zahara Moufid as Juror 6
- Helen Norton as Juror 12
- Elena Spautz as Juror 5
- Colm Meaney as Ian Bailey
- Aidan Gillen as Hamilton Barnes

== Production ==
In November 2019, Studio Soho, Soho Talent, L'Atelier d'Images, and Hell's Kitchen joined production on the film.

== Release ==
Re-creation premiered at the Tribeca Film Festival on 8 June 2025. The film was released in Ireland on 3 October.

== Reception ==
On the review aggregator website Rotten Tomatoes, 71% of 14 critics' reviews are positive.
