= The Guarantee =

- Film poster
- Directed by: Ian Power
- Written by: Colin Murphy
- Produced by: John Kelleher Media in association with the Broadcasting Authority of Ireland, the Irish Film Board and the commercial television channel TV3
- Starring: David Murray, Gary Lydon, Orla Fitzgerald, Morgan C. Jones and Peter Coonan
- Release date: 30 October 2014
- Country: Ireland
- Language: English

The Guarantee is a 2014 Irish drama film written by Colin Murphy, and starring David Murray, Gary Lydon, Orla Fitzgerald, Morgan C. Jones and Peter Coonan. Directed by Ian Power, and based on Murphy's play of the same title, the film explores the events leading up to the Irish banking crisis, the title referring to a meeting of high-level officials that was held on 29 September 2008 and resulted in the Irish Government taking the decision to guarantee Ireland's entire domestic banking system. The film was produced by John Kelleher Media in association with the Broadcasting Authority of Ireland, the Irish Film Board and the commercial television channel TV3.

A trailer for the film was released on 14 October 2014, and it debuted in Irish cinemas on 30 October. The Guarantee received its world television premiere on Ireland's TV3 at 9.00 p.m. on 8 January 2015.
