= Broken Law =

2020 Irish film

- Film poster
- Directed by: Paddy Slattery
- Written by: Paddy Slattery
- Produced by: Simon Doyle; Ian Hunt-Duffy; Shane Ryan; Paddy Slattery
- Starring: Tristan Heanue; Graham Earley; John Connors; Gemma-Leah Devereux; Ally Ní Chiaráin; Gary Lydon; Ryan Lincoln
- Cinematography: Narayan Van Maele
- Edited by: John Desay
- Music by: Michael Fleming
- Production companies: FailSafe Films; True Line Films
- Distributed by: Break Out Pictures
- Release dates: 28 February 2020 (Dublin Film Festival); 31 July 2020 (Ireland)
- Country: Ireland
- Language: English

Broken Law (previously entitled Let Your Guard Down and The Broken Law of Attraction) is a 2020 Irish crime drama film directed by short film maker Paddy Slattery. It stars Tristan Heanue, John Connors and Gemma-Leah Devereux. It was the result of a crowd-funding initiative from Slattery. It premiered at the Dublin International Film Festival in 2020, with Slattery winning an Aer Lingus Discovery Award for his work.

== Plot ==
David Connolly is a respected member of An Garda Síochána but his loyalty to the law gets tested by his ex-convict brother Joe who is in desperate need of his help.

== Cast ==
- Tristan Heanue as David Connolly, a garda (policeman) in Dublin
- Graham Earley as Joe Connolly, David's brother
- John Connors as Wallace, a friend of Joe's
- Gemma-Leah Devereux as Amia McNamara, a credit union employee and David's love interest
- Ally Ní Charáin as Irene Connolly, mother of David and Joe
- Ryan Lincoln as Pete, a friend of Wallace

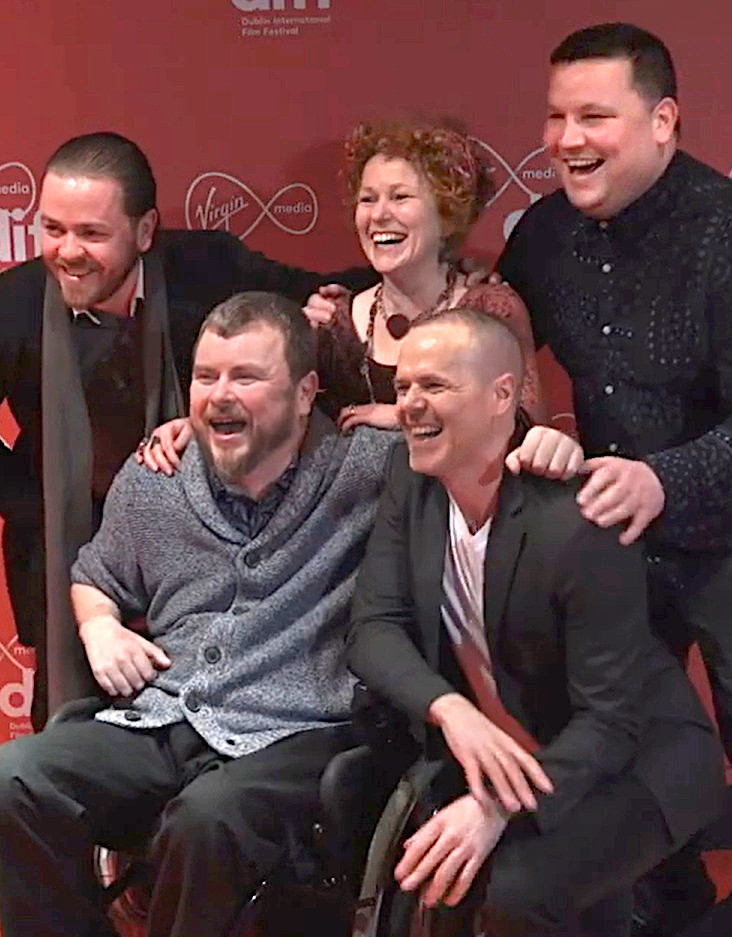
Broken Law (2020) film cast and director at VDIFF20
