= Cardboard Gangsters =

- Irish release poster
- Directed by: Mark O'Connor
- Written by: John Connors; Mark O'Connor
- Story by: John Connors
- Starring: John Connors; Damien Dempsey; Fíonna Hewitt Twamley; Kierston Wareing; Gemma-Leah Devereux; Kyle Bradley Donaldson; Lydia McGuinness
- Production companies: Five Knight Films Limited; EGG Post Production; Stalker Films; Teach Solais
- Distributed by: Wildcard Distribution (Ireland)
- Release dates: 22 April 2017 (Newport); 16 June 2017 (Ireland)
- Running time: 92 minutes
- Country: Ireland
- Language: English

Cardboard Gangsters is a 2017 Irish crime film set in Darndale, Coolock, Dublin. It was funded by Broadcasting Authority of Ireland.

== Plot ==
The film follows Jay and his friends as they attempt to take control of the Darndale drug trade from Murphy, who has controlled the Darndale drug trade for the last 30 years.

24 year old Jayson "Jay" Connelly, who lives with his friends in Darndale, Coolock with his friends Dano, Glenner and Cobbie; learns he is cut off from unemployment benefits due to a recent DJing gig. To make matters worse, he finds out his mother has been taking loans from Derra Murphy, the local crime lord, to pay for her debts and bills. Jay and his friends begin procure and deal drugs on Darndale territory, spiting Derra. All the while, Jay strikes up a relationship with Kim Murphy, Derra's wife, which ruins his budding relationship with Sarah, his girlfriend.

Kim is beaten to a pulp over her affair with Jay. Derra invites Jay over to his house with a job offer, only to be rebuffed by Jay at gunpoint. Enraged by the insult, Sean Murphy, Derra's hotheaded son, murders Cobbie in response. Jay and his crew retaliate by kidnapping and killing Sean. Glenner flees the suburbs, leaving Dano and Jay behind. Derra and his crew hunt down and kill Dano as Jay takes his family and Sarah, pregnant with their child, on the run. While at the airport, Jay receives a phone call from Kim, asking him to rescue her from the Murphy household. Allowing Sarah and his mum to go first, Jay goes back to pick Kim up out of guilt. It turns out to be a trap: Kim betrays him to Derra's gang for murdering her son. Jay is taken to the lake where he killed Sean and executed, the last thing he sees being the plane taking his loved ones to safety.

== Cast ==
- John Connors as Jayson "Jay" Connolly
- Fionn Walton as Dano
- Paul Alwright as Glenner
- Ryan Lincoln as Cobbie
- Jimmy Smallhorne as Derra Murphy
- Ciaran McCabe as Sean Murphy
- Damien Dempsey as Curly Murphy
- Fíonna Hewitt Twamley as Angela Connolly
- Kierston Wareing as Kim Murphy
- Gemma-Leah Devereux as Roisin
- Kyle Bradley Donaldson as Stephen Kelly
- Lydia McGuinness as Christina
- Toni O'Rourke as Sarah
- Stephen Clinch as Ross Kelly
- Mark O'Connor as Frightened Hood

== Production ==
John Connors wrote the original script for the film and asked Mark O'Connor. who he had previously worked with on Stalker and King of the Travellers to come on the project as a Director. O'Connor agreed to direct the film if he could do a re-write of the script, which Connors agreed to. The film was shot in Darndale.

Connors was friends with several local Dublin rappers, such as Lethal Dialect and God Creative, who agreed for their music to be used in the films score. The film's entire budget (€300,000) was funded by the BAI's Sound and Vision Fund in 2016.

== Reception ==
On the review aggregator website Rotten Tomatoes, the film holds an approval rating of 94% based on 18 reviews. Moreover, it earned €550,000 at the national box office and became the most viewed Irish film of 2017.

== See also ==
- Paper tiger
