= Out of Here (film) =

2013 Irish film

- Film Poster
- Directed by: Dónal Foreman
- Written by: Dónal Foreman
- Produced by: Emmet Fleming, Mark O’Connor
- Starring: Fionn Walton; Aoife Duffin; Dean Kavanagh; Annabell Rickerby; Emma Eliza Regan; Gina Moxley; Arthur Riordan
- Cinematography: Piers McGrail
- Edited by: Dónal Foreman
- Release date: 13 July 2013 (Galway)
- Running time: 80 mins.
- Country: Ireland
- Language: English

Out of Here is a 2013 Irish drama film, directed and written by Dónal Foreman. The film stars Fionn Walton (Ó Loingsigh), Dean Kavanagh, Emma Eliza Regan, Arthur Riordan, Annabell Rickerby, Aoife Duffin, and Gina Moxley. The film was produced by Mark O'Connor. It premiered at Galway Film Fleadh in 2013.

== Synopsis ==
After a year traveling the world, Ciaran reluctantly returns to his hometown of Dublin, broke and stuck living with his parents. As he struggles to reconnect with the ex-girlfriend that he left behind and the friends and social scene that have moved on without him.

== Cast ==
- Fionn Walton as Ciarán
- Aoife Duffin as Melissa
- Laoise Murray as Aine
- Daniel Bergin as Chris
- Dean Kavanagh as Ronan
- Emma Eliza Regan as Ruth
- Gina Moxley as Vivienne
- Arthur Riordan as Dermot
- Annabell Rickerby as Jess
- Stephen Mullan as Eric
- Gareth Stack as Tom
- Jer O'Leary as Freddie
- Philip Kenny as John
- Nigel Brennan as Barry

== Reception ==
Donald Clarke of The Irish Times rated it 4/5 stars and stated, "This is what can happen when a talented young director is allowed to make the film he really wants to make. One of a kind. What a debut." Anthony Assad of Film Ireland praised filmmaker Dónal Foreman for his "exceptional direction". Doug Whelan of the Irish Independent lauded the "engaging performances from an unknown cast and a captivating visual style". Brian Lloyd of Entertainment.ie applauded the performances of Fionn Walton ("restrained and mature turn") and Dean Kavanagh ("kooky").
