= Doineann =

Irish crime film

- Poster
- Directed by: Damian McCann
- Screenplay by: Aislinn Clarke
- Produced by: Michael Hewitt; Dermot Lavery; Chris Myers
- Starring: Peter Coonan; Bríd Brennan; Clare Monnelly; Seán T. Ó Meallaigh
- Cinematography: Damien Elliott; Angus Mitchell
- Edited by: Sorcha Nic Giolla Mhuire
- Music by: Mark Gordon; Charlie Graham; Richard Hill
- Production company: DoubleBand Films
- Distributed by: Wildcard Distribution
- Release dates: 25 July 2021 (Galway Film Fleadh); 28 January 2022 (general release)
- Running time: 95 minutes
- Country: Northern Ireland
- Languages: Irish; English

Doineann ([ˈd̪ˠɪnʲən̪ˠ], "stormy weather") is a 2021 Northern Irish drama film in the Irish language, directed by Damian McCann.

== Plot ==
Tomás is a Dublin investigative journalist, reporting on criminal gangs. He goes on holiday to an island off Ireland's coast with his family. He receives an urgent call to return to Dublin, but when he later returns to the island his wife and child are missing. A local Garda detective starts to help him find them, as the storm closes in.

== Production ==
Doineann was filmed in County Down and Islandmagee in winter 2020–21 and received support from Northern Ireland Screen, BBC Gaeilge and TG4; it is the first Irish language feature to be made and produced in Northern Ireland.

It was filmed on an Arri Alexa Mini with Panavision Primo Lenses in a 2.39:1 aspect ratio.

== Release ==
Doineann premiered on 25 July 2021 at the Galway Film Fleadh. The Irish Times, Irish Examiner and entertainment.ie all scored it three stars out of five. Reviewers noted the similarities to Nordic noir and praised the performance of Bríd Brennan as a Columbo-style investigator, but criticised the latter part of the film as clichéd.

Peter Coonan received a nomination at the 18th Irish Film & Television Awards (IFTAs), for best supporting actor in a film.
