= His & Hers (2009 film) =

- Directed by: Ken Wardrop
- Produced by: Ken Wardrop
- Production companies: Irish Film Board; Venom Films
- Distributed by: Element Pictures
- Release dates: July 2009 (Galway Film Fleadh); 11 March 2011 (UK)
- Country: Ireland
- Language: English

His & Hers is a 2009 Irish documentary film directed and produced by Ken Wardrop in which Irish women, mainly from the Irish Midlands, talk about their relationships with men.

== Reception ==
On review aggregator website Rotten Tomatoes, the film has an 86% approval rating based on 14 reviews, with an average rating of 6.2/10.

Peter Bradshaw of The Guardian called the documentary "charming", but also added that the film is "pretty obvious and soft-focus[ed]". Julian White of Lettle White Lies wrote "No great surprises in the early segments, but the intensity grows as the shadows of age and illness fall". Cath Clarke of Time Out wrote: "You would need to be made of stone not to be charmed by the wit and warmth of these women". The Village Voice's Michelle Orange said "It's around the birthing years that Wardrop's extremely selective homemaker's oral history-crafted to soothe with its placid framing and cheery, meditative tone-begins to close around you like doily-papered walls".
