= Gary Lydon =

Irish actor (1964–2026)

- Born: Gary Mark O'Brien; 11 September 1964; London, England
- Died: 30 April 2026 (aged 61); Shanballybawn, County Leitrim, Ireland
- Resting place: Kileenan Cemetery, Cootehall, Connacht, Ireland
- Occupations: Stage and screen actor
- Children: 2

Gary Mark O'Brien (11 September 1964 – 30 April 2026), known professionally as Gary Lydon, was an Irish stage and screen actor. He played the role of Garda Peadar Kearney in The Banshees of Inisherin (2022).

== Early life ==
Born in London in 1964 to Irish parents Jimmy O'Brien and his wife Judy (nee Lydon) and growing up in Northolt, Lydon moved with his family to Wexford, Ireland, when he was nine.

As of November 2022, he was living in Leitrim.

== Career ==
Lydon played Patrick Murray, the counsellor on RTÉ One's The Clinic, from 2003 to 2009, a role for which he won an IFTA for Best Supporting Actor in 2007. He also played Bomber in Pure Mule.

He performed on stage as Brendan in Borstal Boy and in Martin McDonagh's The Pillowman.

== Family ==
Lydon had two sons, Seanluke O'Brien and James Doherty O'Brien. James appeared on stage in Of Mornington alongside his father.

== Death ==
Lydon died suddenly on 30 April 2026 at his home in Shanballybawn, Co. Leitrim, aged 61. He is interred in Killeenan Cemetery, Cootehall.

== Filmography ==
- 2000 Ordinary Decent Criminal – Tom Rooney
- 2002 Fergus's Wedding (TV Series) – Shay
- 2002 Sinners (TV Movie) – Patrick
- 2001–2002 On Home Ground (TV Series) – Cathal O'Connor
- 2004 Six Shooter (Short) – Chief Guard
- 2005 Boy Eats Girl – Garda Sergeant
- 2005 Pure Mule (TV Series) – Bomber Brennan
- 2006 Small Engine Repair – Big Eddy
- 2003–2009 The Clinic (TV Series) – Patrick Murray
- 2011 The Guard – Gerry Stanton
- 2011 Stella Days – Larry
- 2011 War Horse – Si Easton
- 2012 Shadow Dancer – Geoff
- 2014 Calvary – Inspector Stanton
- 2014 Love/Hate (TV Series) – Chief Superintendent
- 2014 The Guarantee – Brian Cowen
- 2015 The Hallow – Doyle
- 2015 Brooklyn – Mr. Farrell
- 2016 The Flag – Foley
- 2017 Striking Out (TV Series) – Judge Harrison
- 2020 Broken Law – Superintendent Byrne
- 2022 Sprachlos in Irland (TV Movie) – Geistlicher (by Florian Gärtner)
- 2022 An Encounter (Short) – The Man
- 2022 Lakelands – Bernie
- 2022 The Banshees of Inisherin – Garda Peadar Kearney
- 2023 Barber – Johnny Mulligan
- 2024 Vanilla – Dr. Joe
- 2025 The Sandy Banks – Daniel
