= Trojan Eddie =

1996 film by Gillies MacKinnon

- Directed by: Gillies MacKinnon
- Written by: Billy Roche
- Starring: Richard Harris; Stephen Rea; Brendan Gleeson; Seán McGinley; Angeline Ball; Bríd Brennan; Aislín McGuckin; Pecker Dunne; Stuart Townsend
- Release date: 9 September 1996
- Running time: 105 minutes
- Country: ireland
- Language: English

Trojan Eddie is a 1996-Irish crime drama film directed by Gillies MacKinnon.

== Plot ==
Eddie, a small town ex-con, sets up a business, but encounters danger along the way.

== Filming ==
The "expansive" driveway which leads up to Harristown House in County Kildare, Ireland, as well as the private estate bridge, appeared in the film.
