= Gemma-Leah Devereux =

Irish actress

- Born: 9 August 1990 (age 36); Dublin, Ireland
- Education: ArtsEd
- Occupation: Actress
- Years active: 2008–present

Gemma-Leah Devereux (born 9 August 1990) is an Irish actress. She is known for playing Liza Minnelli in the biographical drama film Judy (2019) opposite Renée Zellweger, and Lady Fitzgerald in the fourth and final season of the television series The Tudors (2010).

== Personal and early life ==
Gemma-Leah Mary Devereux was born in Dublin, Republic of Ireland, the daughter of Irene and Francis Devereux. Her mother is a renowned hairdresser. She is the youngest of four children. She wanted to be an actress from a very early age, and has stated, "I've never wanted to be anything else". Devereux attended Loreto College St Stephens Green and left school at the age of 16. That same year she moved to London to study drama. She trained at the Arts Educational Schools, London for three years.

== Acting career ==
Devereux made her acting debut as Lady Elizabeth Fitzgerald in Showtime's historical fiction television series The Tudors. with Jonathan Rhys Meyers and Henry Cavill. Shortly afterwards she made her theatrical westend debut in The Dreamers of Inishdara at the Jermyn Street Theatre alongside Rocky Horror Show star Patricia Quinn. In 2012 she was cast as her first leading role in a feature film as Kate alongside Ross Noble and Tommy Knight in Stitches directed by Conor McMahon which premiered at Film4 Frightfest 2012 in Empire Leicester Square. That same year she was cast in Comedown, an urban horror-thriller film about a group of South-East London teenagers break into an abandoned tower block to install an aerial for a Pirate Radio Station. It is directed by Menhaj Huda, and starring Adam Deacon, Geoff Bell, Jessica Barden, and Jacob Anderson. The film had its premiere at the Grimmfest 2012 film festival on 4 October. In 2013 she joined Casualty as nurse Aoife O'Reilly. She filmed 14 episodes before her exit. That same year she starred opposite Brian Gleeson in How To Be Happy which follows relationship counsellor Cormac Kavanagh (Gleeson) who starts sleeping with his clients in a misguided attempt to reignite their passions but gets in-tangled when he starts falling for Flor (Devereux), the attractive young private detective assigned to investigate his affairs. In 2014 she starred opposite Killian Scott and Peter Coonan in Get Up And Go an indie film about four 20 something years olds who face a cross road over one day. For her performance in this role she was nominated for Best Supporting Actress at the 2016 Irish Film & Television Academy Awards. In 2015 she starred opposite Callum Blue, Rebecca Knight and David Hayman in psychological thriller Dartmoor Killing which won "Best thriller" at the National Film awards. That same year she filmed feature film Poison Pen; Property of the State opposite Patrick Gibson, Aisling Loftus and Elaine Cassidy. In 2016 she was cast in Simon Bird's directorial debut Ernestine & Kit with Pauline Collins and Rosaleen Linehan. The following year she was cast opposite John Connors in Mark O'Connor's Cardboard Gangsters. The story follows a group of young lads in Darndale, led by Jay Connolly ( Connors), who sell drugs to make a living. It became the highest-grossing film that year. She was cast as a heroin addict in RTE's legal drama Striking Out with Neil Morrissey and Amy Huberman. In 2018 she played Ruth Shine opposite Tom Vaughan-Lawlor in the docudrama Citizen Lane about the life of art dealer Hugh Lane. That same year she was cast opposite John Connors again in Paddy Slattery's directional debut Broken Law. In 2019 she starred as Ciara in RTE's Comedy Drama Bump; a story of two sisters who have been very much at odds since they were young with Charlene McKenna playing her sister and Seán McGinley playing her Father. That same year she filmed period drama Dead Still alongside Michael Smiley and Eileen O'Higgins directed by Imogen Murphy. In 2018 it was announced Devereux would be playing Liza Minnelli in the upcoming Biopic Judy of Judy Garland's life opposite Renée Zellweger as Judy Garland directed by Rupert Goold. Principal photography began on 19 March 2018, in London. Filming locations included West London Film Studios. The film premiered at the Telluride Film Festival on 30 August 2019, and was theatrically released in the United States on 27 September 2019, and in the United Kingdom on 2 October 2019.

== Filmography ==
Film
Year	Title	Role	Notes
2020	The Bright Side	Kate McLaughlin	
2020	Broken Law	Amia McNamara	
2019	Judy	Liza Minnelli	
2019	Judith	Judith	Short
2018	Citizen Lane	Ruth Shine	
2018	A Break in the Clouds	Sarah	Short
2017	Cardboard Gangsters	Róisín	
2016	Ernestine & Kit	Pregnant Woman	Short
2016	Property of the State	Beth	
2015	Afterwards	Woman	Short
2015	Dartmoor Killing	Becky	
2014	Poison Pen	Eva	
2014	Get Up & Go	Lola	
2013	How to Be Happy	Flor	
2012	Stitches	Kate	
2012	Wedding Planners	Laura	Short
2012	Blonde	Steph	Short
2012	Comedown	Nurse Samantha Harris	

Television
Year	Title	Role	Notes
2021-2023	Smother	Anna Ahern	18 Episodes
2019	Bump	Ciara	1 Episode
2019	Dead Still	Hanna Dubby	3 Episodes
2017	Inspektor Jury – Der Tod des Harlekin	Gemma/Dillys	
2013	Casualty	Aoife O'Reilly	Main cast, 14 episodes
2012	Trouble Times Three	Emmalina	4 episodes
2011	Marú	Kitty Bryce	1 episode
2011	Saor Sinn o Olc	Aine	2 episodes
2010	The Tudors	Lady Fitzgerald	5 episodes
