= Steamin' + Dreamin': The Grandmaster Cash Story =

- Official Film Poster
- Directed by: Shaun O' Connor
- Written by: Con Doyle; Joe Kiely; Shaun O' Connor; Conor Stanley
- Produced by: Con Doyle; Joe Kiely; Shaun O' Connor; Conor Stanley
- Starring: Con Doyle; Joe Kiely; Conor Stanley; Tommy Tiernan; Senator Dan Boyle
- Cinematography: Shaun O' Connor
- Edited by: Shaun O' Connor
- Music by: Con Doyle; Shaun O' Connor; Conor Stanley
- Release date: 6 November 2009
- Running time: 89 minutes
- Country: Ireland
- Language: English

Steamin' + Dreamin': The Grandmaster Cash Story is a 2009 Irish independent comedy film directed by Shaun O' Connor, and written by Con Doyle, Joe Kiely, Conor Stanley and O' Connor. The mockumentary stars Doyle as the title character, a Cork hip-hop artist struggling to achieve recognition in the international hip-hop scene. It also stars Stanley as Cash's rival rapper Dr Feekinstein, and Kiely as Seamus Kelly, the sociology student who directs the film's "documentary". The film also features cameo appearances from Tommy Tiernan and Senator Dan Boyle, as well as many well-known Corkonians appearing as themselves. A sequel, Steamin' + Dreamin' 2: Cash Back was released in November 2011.

== Plot ==
Seamus Kelly is a sociology student from Cork who, as part of his final year in college, directs a documentary on subcultures in suburbia, eventually coming to focus on the Cork hip-hop scene and local artist Grandmaster Cash in particular. The documentary follows Cash as he struggles to achieve fame and fortune, amidst the trouble of negative critical reception and dealing with the rival hip-hop crew, led by Dr Feekinstein.

== Cast ==
- Con Doyle as Grandmaster Cash
- Conor Stanley as Dr Feekinstein
- Joe Kiely as Seamus Kelly
- Tommy Tiernan as himself
- Senator Dan Boyle as himself
- Pat Fitz as himself
- Paul Mulvaney as himself
- Gary Mahoney as himself
- Ian Richards as himself
- Ernest Cantillon as himself
- Albert Twomey as himself
- Ronan Doyle as R-Bomb

== Production ==
The original idea for the film came from Doyle and Stanley's habit of adopting a stereotypical Cork accent for comic effect. They came together with O' Connor and Kiely to develop a short film which would use this to parody the various amusing aspects of Cork culture. Eventually, the production grew in size and, in response to the cult following amassed by Cash's music videos posted on YouTube, it was decided to make a feature-length film.

The film was produced entirely by Doyle, Kiely, O' Connor and Stanley, and was shot in and around Cork City. Famous Cork landmarks such as Blarney Castle, The Elysian, UCC's Glucksman Gallery, the Cork Docks and Shandon Tower are featured in the film, in both background shots and as filming locations.

During production, Grandmaster Cash's music was launched on Myspace as a means of promoting the film, as well as introducing the character to its target audience. The music achieved a high level of popularity. A music video for "Grandmaster in the Future" was released on YouTube. Short film review videos were also released, entitled "Film Tonight with Grandmaster Cash", which attracted high views. Two music videos (for the songs "It's Alive" and "Ice-Cream") were released by Dr Feekinstein in this time, in order to establish the fictional rivalry between the two artists to the online community.

The film reviews, music videos, and the film's trailer were recommended by local DJs and radio presenters Stevie G, Lenny and Dave Mac, who listed the film as a highlight of the upcoming Cork Film Festival alongside premium attractions such as The Boys Are Back, Taking Woodstock, Up in the Air and the Coen Brothers' A Serious Man. In addition to this, Doyle was invited to be interviewed in character as Grandmaster Cash on the popular Cork radio station Red FM with Stevie G on 9 May 2009, and on Cork Campus Radio on 21 October 2009. Doyle and Stanley appeared on TG4's Irish language talent show Glas Vegas on 24 January 2010 as contestants, where judge and "mentor" Paraic Breathnach praised the song they performed together as "unique and funny". Despite a positive audience reaction, the duo were voted off in the first round.

Due to the mockumentary style of the promotional videos, Grandmaster Cash and Dr Feekenstein were mistaken by some for genuine hip-hop artists.

The film's characters have developed a life of their own, with Doyle and Stanley continuing to perform concerts, regularly featured as the Cork Independent's "comedy of the week". The duo has appeared numerous times alongside fellow comedy hip-hop act The Rubberbandits as well as Hardy Bucks. Cash and Feekenstein were featured in a Hot Press article on 6 May 2010.

== Release ==
The film was submitted for consideration in the Cork Film Festival 2009. It was officially announced as part of the festival program on 16 October. It was shown on 6 November in Cork's oldest cinema, The Pavilion. Doyle and Stanley appeared as Grandmaster Cash and Dr Feekinstein respectively after the film's showing to celebrate its release, performing a selection of songs from the film's soundtrack.
Tickets for the film's premiere were sold out within days of going on sale. Due to ongoing demand a second screening was announced for the following day, marking it as the only film to be given two screenings at the festival. This screening was also quickly sold out.

Additionally, the film has received a number of screenings after its original release, in venues such as the National Sculpture Factory.

== Reception ==
Both sold-out screenings received standing ovations. The film was featured as the cover of Cork entertainment magazine Play. The Evening Echo, in a piece highlighting the 2009 Cork Film Festival's attractions, referred to the film as "destined to be one of the hits of the festival". In a later article about the festival in the Evening Echo, the film was given mention alongside titles such as A Serious Man and The Road, as a "moving hip-hop film set to steal the show". Another article in the same publication identified the film as "set to be the funniest film at this year's festival". An article about the film in Kerry newspaper The Kerryman on 4 November detailed aspects of its origins and mentioned its achievement in ticket sales. The film was the subject of the regular "Who the hell goes to..." segment in the Evening Echo on 12 November. The full-page article featured public reactions to the film as well as a positive review.

"...the film chronicling this Leeside Jay-Z and Nas pairing is as authentic as Spinal Tap, and pretty funny with it too... After a rapturous reception the stars of the show took to the stage to deliver what will surely be instant cult classic songs and make us wonder if Grandmaster Cash is the new Ali G."

The Cork News newspaper also released an article about the film on 13 November, considering it "...a Cork Spinal Tap" and complimenting "the talented Mr. Con Doyle". The article also features an in-character note on the film's production, written by Doyle. On 31 November, the film received coverage on the TG4 entertainment review show Imeall. In the 10 March edition of Irish national music magazine Hot Press, the film was featured. The review from deputy editor Stuart Clark praised the film as "a glorious spoof" and "a spot-on parody with zero budget".

== Home media ==
A DVD release of the film was announced on 9 November 2009. The launch party, which took place in The Pavilion, was announced one week later for 16 December. It featured a screening of the film and a performance by Grandmaster Cash and Dr Feekinstein. The DVD has sold well in venues around Cork City. It features two commentaries, an extended interview with Tommy Tiernan, music videos, songs, and the Film Tonight reviews.

== Soundtrack ==
All songs composed and produced by Con Doyle, Conor Stanley, and Shaun O' Connor; performed by Doyle and Stanley.

No.	Title	Music	Length
1.	"Bitch Be Pure Steamin'"	Grandmaster Cash	2:01
2.	"It's Alive"	Dr Feekinstein	3:31
3.	"Quest for the Clit"	Grandmaster Cash	3:52
4.	"One Night Stand"	Dr Feekinstein	3:28
5.	"Give Vadge a Chance"	Grandmaster Cash, Dr Feekinstein	4:43
6.	"Out of Me Mind"	Grandmaster Cash	2:59
7.	"The Shades"	Grandmaster Cash	3:39
8.	"Grandmaster in the Future"	Grandmaster Cash	2:21
9.	"Grandmaster Fortuna"	Grandmaster Cash	2:53
10.	"Ice-Cream"	Dr Feekinstein	3:28
