= King of the Travellers =

- Film poster
- Directed by: Mark O'Connor
- Written by: Mark O'Connor
- Produced by: Cormac Fox
- Starring: John Connors; Peter Coonan; Michael Collins
- Production companies: Irish Film Board, Stalker Films, Vico Films
- Release dates: 14 July 2012 (Galway Film Fleadh); 19 April 2013 (Ireland)
- Running time: 88 minutes
- Country: Ireland
- Language: English

King of the Travellers is a 2012 Irish revenge drama written and directed by Mark O'Connor. The film also marks the acting debut of John Connors.

== Plot ==
The story follows John Paul Moorehouse on his destructive quest to uncover the truth about the killer of his father twelve years ago. John Paul's desire for revenge is swayed as he falls for Winnie Power, the daughter of the man he suspects killed his father. John Paul must now battle between his consuming passion for justice and his desire to be with the woman he now loves.

== Cast ==
- John Connors as John Paul Moorehouse
- Peter Coonan as Mickey Da Bags
- Michael Collins as Francis Moorehouse
- Carla McGlynn as Winnie Powers
- David Murray as Black Martin Moorehouse
- Stephen Clinch as Scully

== Production ==
Director Mark O'Connor had always had an affinity for Travellers, having grown up around them during his childhood and being hit over the head by one when he was young. O’Connor wanted to write a Romeo and Juliet type story, based around two rival Travelling families. The film was originally titled ‘Grooskill’ with Cormac Fox of Vico Films coming on as producer.

In a bid for realism, diversity and authenticity, many non-actor Irish Travellers were cast in acting parts. O’Connor stated it was a risk casting non actor travellers, but felt it was “necessary to give the film real authenticity.” He said he hoped they’d managed to make a film which was “entertaining for audiences, as well as being of cultural importance to the traveller community”.

Actor Peter Coonan spent 3 weeks in a Traveller halting site in North Dublin to properly prepare himself for the role of Mickey Da Bags. Michael Collins took the films director Mark O’Connor to numerous Traveller weddings and halting sites so that he could get a better sense for Traveller culture and life. Travellers were selected to be extras from all parts of the country. Fighting rehearsals took over eight weeks, with the actors landing many real punches during shooting. The fighters wanted the bare knuckle fights in the film to look like Traveller fights from a YouTube video.

O’Connor revealed in an interview with The Irish Times that many people had told him not to make a movie about Travellers, telling him that audiences wouldn’t be interested in seeing it. O’Connor stated that they had only been given four weeks to shoot, which led to a high pressure shoot. He praised his cast and crews ability to work under pressure. The entire film was shot using RED cameras.

Traveller actor Michael Collins claimed there was a misconception about Traveller family feuds, stating that 97% of families never feuded. Collins also revealed that he was refused from a bar because of his traveller heritage, when the crew went out to celebrate the filming’s completion. He praised Peter Coonan for sticking up for him and said the rest of the crew were more annoyed about it than he himself was.

== Release ==
The film premiered at the Jameson Dublin International Film Festival on 14 July 2012 It was released in cinemas on 19 April 2013.

== Reception ==
The film has received generally negative reviews, and holds a 30% "Rotten" rating on aggregate review site Rotten Tomatoes, based on 10 reviews. Variety called the film a "Gaelic Godfather" and praised "the genuinely engrossing action in the well-staged fight scenes." Total Film stated that "the story hits every expected beat and it’s enlivened with directorial bravura." The Independent criticized the film for being "less assured on the nuts and bolts of actual plotting" but praised Peter Coonan's acting performance as "an unregenerate yob who fires up the picture in the same way Robert De Niro's Johnny Boy did in Mean Streets 40 years ago."
