= Angeline Ball =

Irish actress (born 1969)

Paula 'Angeline' Ball
- Born: 28 June 1969 (age 57); Ireland
- Occupations: Actress, singer, musician
- Years active: 1991–present
- Partner: Patrice Gueroult
- Children: 2

Paula 'Angeline' Ball (born 28 June 1969) is an Irish actress who resides in London, England. Born Paula Ball and uses the stage name Angeline Ball. She is known for her roles as Imelda Quirke in Alan Parker's The Commitments (1991) and as Tina in John Boorman's The General (1998). She has appeared in films and television series in the UK and the US. She is also a stage actor, singer, and guitarist.

== Early life and education ==
Ball was raised in Cabra, Dublin. She has one sister, Maria. As a child she trained in tap, ballet and modern dance attending the Billie Barry Stage School at the age of eight.

== Career ==
Ball's breakthrough role came in 1991 when she appeared as backing singer Imelda Quirke in Alan Parker's The Commitments. In 1993, Ian La Frenais and Dick Clement wrote the short-lived TV series Over the Rainbow for her, for which she also wrote the music. In 1994 she played Vada's mother in My Girl 2 for which she sang a rendition of Charlie Chaplin's "Smile". She worked with Alan Parker again in 1996 when she sang backing vocals for the Evita soundtrack album.

In 1997 Ball starred alongside Brendan Gleeson in John Boorman's The General, where she portrayed Tina Lawless, the sister-in-law and mistress of real life Dublin crime boss Martin Cahill. Throughout the 2000s, Ball appeared in a number of UK TV series including Doc Martin, Shameless and Mr Selfridge. On 26 May 2008, she made her debut as Maggie Townsend on the BBC soap opera EastEnders; her final appearance was on 11 June 2008.

== Personal life ==
Ball has two children and lives with her partner, Patrice Gueroult. She speaks fluent French and is a trained pilates and yoga instructor. She plays guitar and released an album in 2020.

== Filmography ==
Film and television
Year	Title	Role	Notes
1991	The Commitments	Imelda Quirke	
1993	Over the Rainbow	Finnoula	
1994	My Girl 2	Maggie Muldovan	
1994	Highlander: The Series	Elizabeth Vaughn	
1994	Casualty	Shirley	
1995	Robin's Hoods		
1995	The Pebble and the Penguin	Gwynne / Chinstrap 3	Voice
1995	Brothers in Trouble	Mary	
1995	Two Nudes Bathing	Simone	
1995	Picture Windows		
1996	Our Friends in the North	Daphne	
1996	Trojan Eddie	Shirley	
1997	The Gambler	Mlle. Blanche	
1997	The General	Tina	
1998	Terror in the Mall	Suzanne Price	
1999	The Outer Limits	Cass Trenton	
1999	The Auteur Theory	Carmela Cicero Maresca	
1999	Peak Practice	Anna Templeton	
2000	Randall & Hopkirk (Deceased)	Annabell	
2000	Housebound	Mignon	
2000	A Christmas Carol	Bella	
2001	The Bombmaker	Lydia McCracken	
2001	Score	Martina	
2002	An Angel for May	Barbara Collins	
2002	Any Time Now	Nora Moggin	Won - IFTA Award Best Actress in a TV Drama
2002	Bait	Millicent White	
2003	Bloom	Molly Bloom	Won - IFTA Award Best Actress in a Film
2003–2007	Jakers! The Adventures of Piggley Winks	Piggley Winks, Miss Nanny, Millie	Voice, UK dub
2005	Rose and Maloney	Julie	
2005	Doc Martin	Julie Mitchell	
2006	The Tiger's Tail	Ursula	
2006	What We Did on Our Holiday	Laura Taylor	
2006	Dead Long Enough	Sinead	
2007	Trouble in Paradise	Annie Little	
2008	EastEnders	Maggie Townsend	Recurring role
2009	Hard Times	PC Anne Mooney	Film was originally titled as Holy Water until changed to present title
2009	Cold Turkey	Patricia Quinn	
2011	Albert Nobbs	Mrs. Gilligan	
2012–2013	Shameless	Gloria Meak	
2013	Mr Selfridge	Mrs. Worthington	
2016	Wifey Redux	Saoirse Prendergast	
2017	Kat and Alfie: Redwater	Eileen Harrington	
2017	Acceptable Risk	Detective Sergeant Emer Byrne / Berry	Nominated - IFTA Award Best Actress in a Supporting Role
2017	Keeping Faith	Gael Reardon	
2021	Deadly Cuts	Michelle	Nominated - IFTA Award Lead Actress - Film
2021	Hidden Assets	Detective Sergeant Emer Berry	Nominated - IFTA Award Lead Actress - Drama

== Discography ==
=== Soundtracks ===
List of albums, with selected chart positions
Title	Details	Chart positions	Certifications
Title	Details	Billboard 200	Certifications
The Commitments (Original Motion Picture Soundtrack)	Released: 1991; Label: RCA Records; Formats: CD, download	8	BPI: 3× Platinum
The Commitments Vol. 2 (Music From The Original Motion Picture Soundtrack)	Released: 1992; Label: RCA Records; Formats: CD, download	118	BPI: Gold
Evita	Released: 1996; Label: Warner Bros.; Formats: CD, download	26	RIAA: 5× Platinum

== Awards and nominations ==
Year	Award	Category	Result
2021	IFTA Award	Lead Actress - Drama (Hidden Assets)	Nominated
2021	IFTA Award	Lead Actress - Film (Deadly Cuts)	Nominated
2018	IFTA Award	Best Actress in a Supporting Role - Drama (Acceptable Risk)	Nominated
2008	Irish Times Theatre Awards	Best Actress in a Supporting Role (The Playboy Of The Western World)	Nominated
2003	IFTA Award	Best Actress in a Film (Bloom)	Won
2003	IFTA Award	Best Actress in a TV Drama (Any Time Now)	Won
