= David Murray (actor) =

Irish actor (born 1970)

- Born: 7 February 1970 (age 56); Cork, Ireland
- Occupation: Actor
- Years active: 1996–present

David Murray (born 1970) is an Irish actor who has portrayed both minor and major characters in Irish film and television. Some of his best known roles include his portrayal of Brian Lenihan Jnr in The Guarantee and Ben Bailey in the Irish television series Amber. Additionally he has had small roles in major productions such as King Arthur, Batman Begins and G.I. Joe: The Rise of Cobra. In 2010, he starred in a television commercial for the opening of Dublin Airport's new terminal building.

== Criminal charges ==
In 2014, Murray was convicted for attacking his former girlfriend who accused him of hitting and strangling her during a domestic row, which was said to have happened at her former home, a studio apartment, in Grosvenor Sq, in Rathmines, south Dublin, in the early hours of October 5, 2013. He was found guilty at the Dublin District Court. However, Murray was not sentenced to jail and went free, following a fine of €5000. Murray would request an appeal and a trial would be granted. However, on the day of the trial, Murray's solicitor that the appeal request had been withdrawn. David wasn't present in court that day and the conviction has since stood.

== Personal life ==
Originally from Cork, Murray now resides in South Circular Road, Dublin and is a father of two.

== Filmography ==
=== Film ===
- The Sun, the Moon and the Stars (1996) – Danny
- Flick (2000) – Jack Flinter
- Veronica Guerin (2003) – Charles Bowden
- The Honeymooners (2003) – Ray
- Cowboys & Angels (2003) – Keith
- King Arthur (2004) – Merlin's Lieutenant
- Out of Season (2004) – Simeon Guant
- Six Shooter (2004) — Doctor
- Batman Begins (2005) – Jumpy Thug
- Studs (2006) — Belview Dynamo Manager
- Dorothy Mills (2008) – Tom O'Brien
- Zonad (2009) – Benson
- G.I. Joe: The Rise of Cobra (2009) – James McCullen IX (1641)
- Withdrawal (2011) — Val
- Keys to the City (2012) – Declan
- King of the Travellers (2012) – Black Martin
- I Can't See Anymore (2012) — Aidan
- No Messages (2012) — Simon
- Davin (2014) – Philip
- The Guarantee (2014) – Brian Lenihan
- Deadbook (2014) — Stephen O'Reilly
- Personal Development (2014) — Fintan
- Enclave (2015) — Leon
- Traders (2015) – Kevin
- Johnny Gone Down (2016) – Ishmael, Abraham
- Lead Us Not (2016) – Dr. Alan Ryan
- The Welfare of Tomás Ó Hallissy (2016)- Man
- Wild Fire Nights (2017) — Ivan
- The Limit Of (2018) — Dr. Alan Ryan
- Tyre Kickers (2020) — Dad
- Two Hours Past Midnight (2020) — Zbigniew Brzezinski

=== Television ===
- The Cassidys (2001) – Giles
- River City (2006) – Michael Royston
- Little White Lie (2008) – Director
- Raw (2008) – Karl Creed
- Revolution (2009) – David Ash
- The Importance of Being Whatever (2011) – Mr. B
- Silent Witness (2013) – Alan Lane
- Jack Taylor: The Dramatist (2013) – Professor Doyle
- Vikings (2013) – Lord Aethelwulf
- Ripper Street (2013) – Ely
- Amber (2014) – Ben Bailey
- Quirke (2014) – John Millican
- White City (2015) – Colin Flanagan
- Red Rock (2017) — Paul Mahony
