= Bloom (2003 film) =

- DVD cover
- Directed by: Sean Walsh
- Screenplay by: Sean Walsh
- Based on: Ulysses by James Joyce
- Produced by: Gerry Murphy
- Starring: Stephen Rea; Angeline Ball; Hugh O'Conor
- Cinematography: Ciaran Tanham
- Edited by: Sarah Armstrong
- Production company: Odyssey Pictures
- Distributed by: Stoney Road Films
- Release dates: 13 June 2003 (Taormina Film Festival); 16 April 2004 (Ireland)
- Running time: 113 minutes
- Country: Ireland
- Language: English

Bloom is a 2003 Irish film written and directed by Sean Walsh, based on the 1922 novel Ulysses by James Joyce. The film premiered at the 2003 Taormina Film Festival. Angeline Ball won the award for "Best Actress in a Film" at the Irish Film and Television Awards. The soundtrack was written and produced by David Kahne.

== Premise ==
Bloom takes place on 16 June 1904 and attempts to make a visual reconstruction of Joyce's stream of consciousness style.

== Cast ==
- Stephen Rea as Leopold Bloom
- Angeline Ball as Molly Bloom
- Hugh O'Conor as Stephen Dedalus
- Mark Huberman as Haines
- Eoin McCarthy as Blazes Boylan
- Alvaro Lucchesi as Buck Mulligan
- Patrick Bergin as Citizen
