= Stalker (2012 film) =

2012 Irish psychological thriller film by Mark O'Connor

- Official poster
- Directed by: Mark O'Connor
- Written by: Mark O'Connor; John Connors
- Produced by: TJ O'Grady-Peyton
- Starring: Barry Keoghan; Peter Coonan; John Connors
- Production company: Stalker Films
- Release date: 13 July 2012 (Galway Film Fleadh)
- Running time: 80 minutes
- Country: Ireland
- Language: English

Stalker is a 2012 Irish psychological thriller film written and directed by Mark O'Connor.

== Plot ==
Oliver Nolan, a volatile homeless man, wanders the streets of Dublin City during the Christmas period. After an unusual encounter with an evangelist, Oliver believes he is sent on a mission from God to clean up society. When he saves a disaffected young boy named Tommy from some local bullies an unlikely friendship is formed. Oliver soon learns that Tommy’s mother is an addict and his uncle Rudyard is a local drug dealer, and takes it upon himself to get even with Rudyard and his gang of petty criminals for taking advantage of his only friend, Tommy.

== Cast ==
- John Connors as Oliver
- Barry Keoghan as Tommy
- Peter Coonan as Rudyard
- Michael Collins as Karl
- Stephen Clinch as Sausage

== Production ==
Stalker is Ireland's first crowd funded feature film. The film was shot on location in Dublin and Wicklow on Canon 5D Mark 2.

== Release ==
The film premiered at the Galway Film Fleadh on 13 July 2012.

== Reception ==
Despite the film's microbudget it has received positive critical response. The Irish Times called Mark O'Connor “a young wizard of cut-price film-making" and described the film as a "violent, picaresque trawl through contemporary Dublin discontents." The film received 'Runner Up' in the Best Irish Feature Film category at Galway Film Fleadh 2012.
