= Get Up & Go =

2014 Irish film

- Theatrical film poster
- Directed by: Brendan Grant
- Written by: Brendan Grant
- Starring: Peter Coonan; Killian Scott; Gemma-Leah Devereux; Sara Gregory; Emma Eliza Regan; Róisín O'Donovan
- Release dates: July 10, 2014 (Galway); November 15, 2014 (Cork); May 1, 2015 (Ireland)
- Running time: 98 mins.
- Countries: Ireland; United Kingdom
- Language: English

Get Up & Go is a 2014 Irish-British dramedy film written and directed by Brendan Grant in his feature film debut. It stars Peter Coonan, Killian Scott, Gemma-Leah Devereux, Sara Gregory, Emma Eliza Regan, Ryan McParland, Natalia Kostrzewa, and Róisín O'Donovan. This premiered at Galway Film Fleadh in 2014, before being released the following year country-wide in Ireland.

== Synopsis ==
Set in Dublin, the film follows a close knit group of twenty-something friends as they are forced to confront the reality of lives and friendships which have gone unchallenged and unchanged since their teenage years.

== Cast ==
- Peter Coonan as Alex
- Killian Scott as Coilin
- Gemma-Leah Devereux as Lola
- Sara Gregory as Ella
- Emma Eliza Regan as Tara
- Róisín O'Donovan as Aine
- Natalia Kostrzewa as Justine
- Ryan McParland as Gary
- Sarah McCall as Sinead
- Aidan Lawlor as John
- Fionn Ó Loingsigh as Alan
- Mark Doherty as Mr. Ryan

== Reception ==
Stephen Martin of The Irish Post dubs this "An enjoyable, low-key, bittersweet comedy" and says "Killian Scott and Peter Coonan share powerful screen chemistry". The website No More Workhorse praises the film's showcase of the city of Dublin, particularly its "more youthful and even vibrant side". And Entertainment.ie rates it 3.5/5 stars, stating writer/director "Brendan Grant does make it easy to slip into the relaxed groove" in regards to the mood and tone of the film.

Meanwhile, Donald Clarke of The Irish Times rates the film 3/5 stars, calling it "Withnail and I for the new century", but laments that something is "missing from its soul". And Ellen Murphy lambasts the film for "leaving audiences unsatisfied" and calls the two leads "completely unlikable".
