= Between the Canals =

- Official poster
- Directed by: Mark O'Connor
- Written by: Mark O'Connor
- Starring: Peter Coonan, Dan Hyland, Stephen Jones, Damien Dempsey
- Production company: Irish Film Board
- Distributed by: Avalon Films
- Release dates: 24 February 2010 (Jameson Dublin); 18 March 2011 (Ireland)
- Running time: 88 minutes
- Country: Ireland
- Language: English

Between the Canals is a 2010 Irish crime film written and directed by Mark O'Connor.

== Plot ==
The film follows three small-time criminals as they pinball their way about Dublin on a boozy Saint Patrick's Day. Liam (Dan Hyland) is plotting an escape from minor villainy. Dave (Peter Coonan) hopes to move up the criminal pecking order, while Scratcher (Stephen Jones) seems happy to coast.

== Cast ==
- Peter Coonan as Dave Fennel
- Dan Hyland as Liam Mulligan
- Stephen Jones as Scratcher
- Damien Dempsey as Paul Chambers
- Barry Keoghan as Aido
- Stephen Clinch as Limbo

== Production ==
The film was shot in a speedy, mobile style around Sheriff Street, Dublin. During the films production, O’Connor spent two years working with the After School’s Project in Sheriff Street, alongside Irish Actor Peter Coonan. O’Connor stated that during their time with the group they witnessed many teenagers from normal families who had taken a wrong turn. On one particular day, while shooting the film, they witnessed a teenager on a BMX shoot a man dead in a car in the same spot Peter Coonan’s character ‘Dots’ was supposed to be killed off the next day.

== Release ==
The film premiered at the Jameson Dublin International Film Festival on 24 February 2010. It was released in Irish cinemas on 18 March 2011.

== Reception ==
The film has received strongly positive reviews. The Irish Times stated "Inner-city Dublin has often been the subject of Irish films, but few previous releases have got so close to the exhaust fumes, car alarms and fag ash." Entertainment.ie called it "a rough-and-ready drama that's a cross between Mean Streets and La Haine."
