= Deadly Cuts =

2021 Irish comedy film

- Poster
- Directed by: Rachel Carey
- Produced by: Liz Gill; Auveen Lush; Ciara O'Sullivan
- Starring: Angeline Ball; Ericka Roe; Lauren Larkin; Shauna Higgins; Aidan McArdle; Pauline McLynn; Victoria Smurfit
- Cinematography: J J Rolfe
- Edited by: Gavin Buckley; John Walters
- Music by: Ray Harman
- Production companies: Screen Ireland; Broadcasting Authority of Ireland; Myriad Pictures; O'Sullivan Productions; Virgin Media Television
- Distributed by: Wildcard Distribution
- Release dates: 14 March 2021 (DIFF); 8 October 2021
- Running time: 90 minutes
- Country: Ireland
- Language: English
- Box office: US$229,349 (world)

Deadly Cuts is a 2021 Irish comedy film directed and written by Rachel Carey.

== Production ==
Deadly Cuts was filmed on location in Loughlinstown.

== Plot ==
North Dublin hairdressers Deadly Cuts must fight for its survival against both a local protection racket and then a greedy developer; they then enter a televised hairdressing competition.

== Release ==
Deadly Cuts was the most successful Irish film at the box office for 2021.

== Reception ==
Rotten Tomatoes reported an approval rating of 94% based on 17 reviews. The Irish Times gave it 3 stars out of 5, criticising the broad comedy, which they compared negatively with Mrs. Brown's Boys, but praising the performances of Victoria Smurfit and Pauline McLynn. The Guardian gave it 2 out of 5, referring to the "Ortonesque" murder plot, but saying the film was "more silly than funny."

It was nominated for five Irish Film and Television Awards, winning one (Best Costume Design for Kathy Strachan).

=== Awards and nominations ===
Year	Award	Category	Recipient(s)	Result	Ref.
2022	Irish Film & Television Awards	Best Film	Deadly Cuts	Nominated	
2022	Irish Film & Television Awards	Best Actress in a Leading Role — Film	Angeline Ball	Nominated	
2022	Irish Film & Television Awards	Best Production Design	Tamara Conboy	Nominated	
2022	Irish Film & Television Awards	Best Costume Design	Kathy Strachan	Won	
2022	Irish Film & Television Awards	Best Makeup & Hair	Lyndsey Herron & Edwina Kelly	Nominated	
