= Screen Ireland =

Irish state development body for film, TV and animation

- Fís Éireann
- Founded: 1980–87, 1993–present
- Type: Film, television and animation funding
- Location: Galway, Ireland
- Region served: Ireland
- Website: www.screenireland.ie

Screen Ireland (Irish: Fís Éireann), formerly known as the Irish Film Board (Irish: Bord Scannán na hÉireann), is Ireland's state development agency for the Irish film, television and animation industry. It provides funding for the development, production, and distribution of feature films, feature documentaries, short films, TV animation series and TV drama series.

== History ==
The Irish Film Board (IFB) was established to develop filmmaking in Ireland under the provisions of the Irish Film Board Act 1980. Over the following seven years, it funded or co-funded a total of 10 feature films, including Eat the Peach, Anne Devlin and Angel, before its activities were suspended by Taoiseach Charles Haughey. After its closure, the success of several externally funded Irish films, such as My Left Foot, The Crying Game and The Commitments motivated local lobbyists to push for its re-establishment, which occurred in 1993. The board was reconstituted under the chairmanship of Lelia Doolan in 1993 by the Minister for Arts, Culture and the Gaeltacht, Michael D. Higgins, who said, "The whole reasoning behind my decision to develop the industry by means of a two-pronged approach – namely, the reactivation of the Irish Film Board and my proposals in relation to independent television production contained in the Broadcasting Authority (Amendment) Bill 1993 – is precisely to exploit the technical facilities available in Ireland at present and the imaginative and creative skills which exist in that industry which have been underemployed".

=== Fís Éireann/Screen Ireland ===
In 2015, Heather Humphreys, the Minister for Arts, Heritage and the Gaeltacht, announced a decision to change the name of the agency, saying that the name change "recognises the body's increasing interests beyond the world of cinema and reminds us how, in this digital age, filmmakers now rarely work in the medium of 'film'." On 10 April 2018, at a press conference for the publication of Investing in our Culture, Language and Heritage 2018–2027 (published as part of Project Ireland 2040), Josepha Madigan, the Minister for Culture, Heritage and the Gaeltacht, announced that from 18 June 2018, the agency would become known as Fís Éireann/Screen Ireland.

=== International recognition ===
From 1993 to 2004, the organisation supported an indigenous industry which produced over 100 feature films. Irish film talent was recognized internationally and industry collaboration of Irish producers, writers and directors was well underway producing such work as Ailsa (1993), I Went Down (1997), About Adam (1999), Disco Pigs (2000), Bloody Sunday (2002), Intermission (2003), The Magdalene Sisters (2003), Omagh (2004), Man About Dog (2004), Adam & Paul (2004), Breakfast on Pluto (2005), The Wind that Shakes the Barley (2006) Once (2007), Garage (2007), The Secret of Kells (2009), His & Hers (2009) The Guard (2011), Albert Nobbs (2012), What Richard Did (2012), The Stag (2014), Calvary (2014), Song of the Sea (2014), The Lobster (2015), Brooklyn (2015) and Room (2015).

Notable Irish box office successes for Irish film include Intermission which grossed over €2 million at the Irish box office in 2003, Man About Dog which in 2004 grossed over €2.5 million at the Irish box office, The Guard which grossed over €18 million at the international box office and Brooklyn which had earned over €2 million at the Irish box office and €11 million at the US box office as of December 2015.

IFB-funded productions featured at major international awards include Six Shooter (Best Live Action Short Film, Academy Awards 2006), The Wind that Shakes the Barley (Palme d’Or, Cannes Film Festival 2006), Once (Best Original Song, Academy Awards 2008), The Secret of Kells (nominated for Best Animated Feature, Academy Awards 2010), Mea Maxima Culpa: Silence in the House of God (Exceptional Merit in documentary Filmmaking, Emmy Awards 2013), Song of the Sea (nominated for Best Animated Feature, Academy Awards 2015), The Lobster (Jury Prize, Cannes Film Festival 2015), Room (People's Choice Award, Toronto International Film Festival 2015), The Killing of a Sacred Deer and The Breadwinner (Academy Awards nomination).

=== International production ===
From 1994 to 2004, there were high levels of international film productions choosing Ireland as a location for filming as a result of the Irish tax incentive for film and television in section 35 of the Finance Act 1987 (later section 481 of the Taxes Consolidation Act 1997). This film production tax incentive made Ireland more competitive for film production than its international competitors. As a result of the high levels of incoming production into Ireland, the craft and skills base of Irish crews improved, and those crews were then also available to work on Irish films. Major international films shot in Ireland during this period include Braveheart and Reign of Fire.

In the 21st century Ireland has become the base for a number of high-end international TV dramas including The Tudors (2007–2010), Ripper Street (2012–2016), Penny Dreadful (2014–2016), Vikings (2013–present), Into the Badlands (2017–present), and Nightflyers (2018–present).

=== Animation ===
The agency did not initially have a policy of funding animation. In 1991, a group of animators and animation students established the Anamú Animation Base, promoting the growth of independent Irish animation. Along with other groups, Anamú successfully lobbied for the film board to support animation projects. From the late 1990s, the film board has provided support to Ireland's animation industry.

=== Board ===
As of 2017, the board was chaired by Annie Doona, the president of Dún Laoghaire Institute of Art, Design and Technology, where the National Film School is located. At that time, the board also consisted of producer Katie Holly, the managing director of Blinder Films; Larry Bass, founder and CEO of ShinAwil Productions; Mark Fenton, founder and CEO of Masf Consulting; Rachel Lysaght, founder and lead creative producer of Underground Films; Kate McColgan, producer and managing director of Calico Productions and Marian Quinn, writer, director and founder of Janey Pictures.

In 2021 the Board consisted of Susan Bergin (Chair Designate), Zelie Asava, John McDonnell, Ray Harman, Eoin Holohan, Marian Quinn, and Kate McColgan. In 2024 Susan Bergin resigned and Ray Harman assumed the role of Chairperson of the Board, with Catherine Magee as a new appointee to the board and Désirée Finnegan having a five year contract extension.

In 2025 Screen Ireland hired Kate McColgan as its Head of Television; which includes being responsible for the management of the Screen Ireland slate across television and animation series, from development to production.

== Funding ==
Screen Ireland operates under the aegis of Department of Culture, Communications and Sport. Its annual budget is decided by Dáil Éireann and it has a budget of €39.2m for 2024, €1.5m more than its budget in 2023. Screen Ireland provides funds for the development, production and distribution of feature films, feature documentaries, short films, TV animation series and TV drama series.

== Selected filmography ==
- Michael Collins
- Beckett on Film
- Never Grow Old
- She's Missing
- When Brendan Met Trudy
- Black 47
- The Killing of a Sacred Deer
- The Breadwinner
- Wolfwalkers
- The Man Who Invented Christmas
- Sing Street
- Room
- Brooklyn
- The Lobster
- D'Video
- What Richard Did
- I Went Down
- Song of the Sea
- The Hardy Bucks Movie
- The Quiet Girl
- Calvary
- The Wind That Shakes the Barley
- Once
- Parked
- Garage
- What If
- The Guard
- The Last Days on Mars
- Stitches
- Niko & The Way to the Stars
- 32A
- Between the Canals
- Inside I'm Dancing
- Wake Wood
- Outcast
- The Revolution Will Not Be Televised
- The Secret of Kells
- The Eclipse
- Grabbers
- All You Need Is Death

== See also ==
- Cinema of Ireland
- Television in the Republic of Ireland
- List of Irish films
