= John Connors (actor) =

Irish Traveller actor (born 1990)

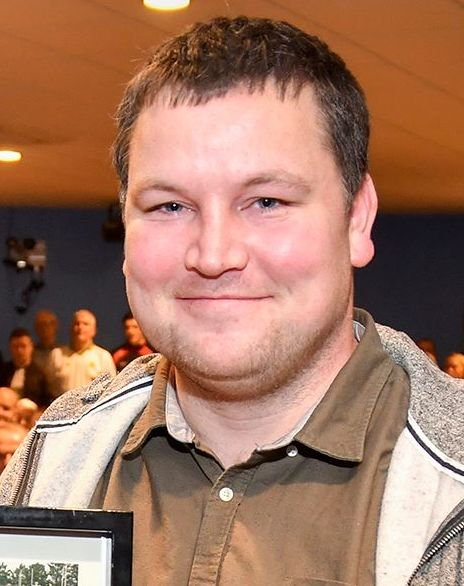
- Connors in 2020
- Born: 5 January 1990 (age 36); London, England
- Other names: Johnny, John Francis
- Occupations: Actor, screenwriter, documentary filmmaker, playwright and activist
- Years active: 2011–present
- Known for: Love/Hate: Cardboard Gangsters; Stalker
- Spouse: Danielle Magennis (m. 2026)

John Connors (born 5 January 1990) is an Irish actor, screenwriter, and documentary filmmaker and playwright best known for his role as Patrick Ward in the Irish crime drama series Love/Hate, for which he was nominated for best-supporting actor at the 2016 Irish film and television awards, and for Cardboard Gangsters, for which he won Best Actor at the 2018 Irish film and television awards.

== Early life and career ==
Connors was born on 5 January 1990 in London, United Kingdom to an Irish traveller family, and moved to Ireland with his family when he was 11 months old. His father suffered from depression and schizophrenia, and killed himself when Connors was eight years old. Connors took up acting when he was 20 years old after being persuaded by his younger brother Joseph, in a bid to help him with his own battle with depression. Connors began boxing at a young age because he was experiencing bullying. He is a former three-time Irish boxing champion and a four nations boxing gold medalist and was picked by the Herald newspaper for their 'Future Star' segment at fifteen years old. Connors was discriminated against in his school years, claiming that the traveller children were kept on one side of the room and given colouring books as the teachers believed them to be too stupid to read, not bothering to teach them. It was this early discrimination that would inspire Connors to become a traveller activist later in life.

In 2017 he was named in the fifty incredible people who are shaping Ireland by the Irish Independent and he was also named as one of the "twenty twenty-somethings that could influence Ireland and the world" by The Irish Times.

He appeared on an episode of the series Livin' with Lucy (Virgin Media) with Lucy Kennedy, in 2019. Connors won the 2018 IFTA for best actor for his performance in the film Cardboard Gangsters, which Connors also wrote. In his victory speech, Connors criticised the Irish Film Board for not supporting the film, before he talked about his battle with mental health and how acting saved his life. He dedicated the award to his late father. The speech went viral, gaining millions of hits online. Three months later his documentary series, John Connors: The Travellers, won the 2018 IFTA for best documentary series. In the documentary Connors called on the Irish government to formally recognise Travellers as a distinct Irish indigenous ethnic minority, which happened later that year. In his speech, he criticised successive Irish governments for assimilation policies and institutionalised discrimination against Irish Travellers. He also accused the Dún Laoghaire–Rathdown County Council of murder through negligence of the eleven members of the Connors and Lynch Traveller families, eleven of whom died in the Carrickmines fire tragedy in October 2015. Connors's directorial feature documentary debut, Endless Sunshine on a Cloudy Day, won the audience award at the 2020 Dublin International Film Festival. John's first directorial feature in drama, "The Black Guelph" won best film and best actor at the 2022 Oldenburg International film Festival and has received wide spread critical acclaim.

In 2025, Connors released his documentary "Where The Road Meets The Sky", which featured stories of traveller lives, narrated by Chrissy Donohue Ward. The documentary premiered at the Dublin International Film Festival, with DIFF calling it a "Intimate Reminder Of The Enduring Strength Embedded Within Mincéir Culture". Connors also released a teaser for his upcoming crime/thriller "Lost City", which he also produced.

In November of 2025, Connors brought his hit play 'Irelands Call' to West Belfast. The play follows the lives and family histories of three young men as they grow up in Coolock on Dublin's Northside and questions what events shapes them and entices them to a life of crime. It was developed as part of Show in a Bag, an artist development initiative of the Dublin Fringe Festival. The play had originally been performed in Europe, the United States and Australia. Connors starred in the Jim Sheridan movie Re-creation in 2025, with critics calling John's performance "exceptional". In 2025, Connors became engaged to actress Danielle Magennis.

Connors has stated in the past that he has a love/hate relationship with acting, stating as an actor 'you're a tool in the toolbox' and how he 'fucking hates' the fame, expectations and having to work the room as an actor. He expressed his preference for directing, claiming it was what he wanted to focus on more for the future. Additionally, in 2025, John won an award for "Best Actor" at the Oldenburg Film Festival for his performance in the feature film "Crazy Love".

In 2026, it was announced that Connors would be starring in the crime series ‘The Galway Bay Murders’, alongside Colm Meaney, Kate Mulgrew & India Mullen.

== Activism ==
Connors has spoken out about Travellers' rights and against racism and depression, appearing a number of times on The Late Late Show on RTÉ. His first appearance on The Late Late Show caused controversy. Connors was promoting his documentary I am Traveller. When talking about the bigotry and hardship Travellers experience day to day in Ireland the host Ryan Tubridy asked "Do you not think you're sounding a bit like a victim" to which Connors replied "See Ryan you and me live in different worlds. My world has shaped me in such a way that I have the ability look past stereotypes, question popular opinion, think for myself and have empathy for people who have it hard or are experiencing injustice. You live in a comfortable bubble. Enjoy it." RTE were flooded with complaints as to how the host conducted the interview. The interview and the documentary created a national conversation about discrimination against Travellers.

Connors has been publicly critical of Pavee Point directors, Martin Collins and Ronnie Fay, questioning the organisation's commitment to Travellers' rights. These comments were made during a 2019 interview on student radio station Belfield FM, and the podcast of the interview was subsequently removed after Pavee Point complained of defamation.

Connors is anti-abortion and supported a 'No' vote in the 2018 Irish abortion referendum. Following his call for a 'No' vote, he alleged that he was the target of anti-Traveller racism. In response to protests held in Dublin in June 2020 after the death of African American man George Floyd in Minneapolis, Connors questioned whether the same 'anti-racist solidarity' would be shown for Irish Travellers.

In July 2020, Connors called for the resignation of the newly appointed Minister for Children, Equality, Disability, Integration and Youth, Roderic O'Gorman, after a photo taken at 2018 Dublin Pride of O'Gorman alongside British gay rights activist Peter Tatchell emerged, controversial for his advocacy of lowering the age of consent. O'Gorman stated "I met Peter Tatchell once and took a photo. This was the only time I have met him. I knew of him as someone who stood up for LGBT people in countries where their rights were threatened. I was surprised to read some of his quotes from the 90s, which I had not read before. Any of those views would be completely abhorrent to me." Connors accused Tatchell of being a paedophile apologist. He called for O'Gorman to resign during a speech at a protest held outside Leinster House on 11 July. On 19 July, Connors published a full apology to Roderic O'Gorman, stating that he had been "politically naive" and contributed to "hurtful and false assertions" about the TD: "What is difficult for me to accept is that my own misguided anger led me to appear to feed an army of trolls and support groups whose views I find repugnant, whose politics are rotten and whose methods are ugly." O'Gorman said he accepted the apology and considered the issue resolved.

In 2025, Connors teamed up with David Merriman to create "Lights, Camera, Action", an affordable filmmaking course for young filmmakers. Connors felt creating an affordable filmmaking course for young people from disadvantaged backgrounds was important, touching on his own upbringing in Darndale in a traveller halting site and the difficulties he faced when he started out in his career. In 2021, RTE released the reality series 'John Connors' Acting Academy', a series that saw Connors aid aspiring actors from marginalised backgrounds. In 2021, he teamed up with psychologist Tiernan Williams to host an “acting & personal development masterclass”.

John commented on the ongoing traveller feuds in Ireland in March of 2026, following the savage beating of a traveller woman in Birdhill, County Tipperary. After seeing a video online of the woman being beaten with some sort of weapon while another woman filmed, Connors, asked that the families ‘let the feuding stop’ ‘find god’ and urged any travellers involved in or encouraging feuds to stop.

== Filmography ==
=== Film ===
Year	Film	Role	Notes
2012	Stalker	Oliver	
2012	King of the Travellers	John Paul Moorehouse	
2014	Jack and Ralph Plan a Murder	Frankie	
2014	Skunky Dog	Shooter	Short
2015	Breathe	Patrick	Short
2015	Monged	Bernard	
2015	Today	Peter	Short
2015	Fingerprints	Dad	Short
2016	The Secret Scripture	Joe Brady	
2016	Solid	Pat	
2016	Wild Goose Lodge	Ribbonman	
2016	The Legend of Harry and Ambrose	The Shame	
2017	Cardboard Gangsters	Jason Connolly	
2020	Broken Law	Wallace	
2021	Black Medicine	Sean	
2021	A Bend in the River	Paudy McCann	
2021	The Letters	Anthony	
2022	The Black Guelph	Ryan	
2022	The Northside Shtory	John Connors	
2023	Barry Versus The Binman	Shane	Short
2024	Sunrise	Faraday	
2024	Swing Bout	The Guru (voice)	
2024	Sicàr	Hughie	Short
2025	Horseshoe	Cormac Doherty	
2025	The Leopard	Paddy	Short
2025	Re-creation	Juror 3	
2025	Crazy Love	Clayton	
2025	Glitched	Brian	
2026	Murphy vs Christmas	Father	
2026	Bucking Fastard	Brendan The Forklift Driver	
2026	Lemonade	Jordan’s Dad	

=== Television ===
Title	Year	Role	Network	Notes	Ref(s)
Love/Hate	2011–2014	Patrick Ward	RTÉ	10 episodes	
Charlie	2015	Jimmy	RTÉ	1 episode	
Barney Bunion	2015	Paidí	TG4	Irish language 1 episode	
Rebellion	2016	Michael Molloy	RTÉ	2 episodes	
The Alienist	2018	Roundsman Gillooly	TNT	1 episode	
The Young Offenders	2018	Young Man who reports Billy with Knife	RTÉ	1 episode	[1]
The Gentlemen	2024	Car Keys Chris	Netflix	1 episode	
Irish Blood	2025	Wylie Moles	AMC	2 episodes	

=== Filmmaker ===
Year	Title	Role	Type
2012	Stalker	Writer	Feature
2016	John Connors: The Travellers	Writer	TV Series
2017	Cardboard Gangsters	Writer	Feature
2019	Abraham's Bosom	Director	Short
2019	Ciúnas (Silence)	Associate Producer	Short
2019	Anastasi, an Urban lullaby	Producer	TV Special
2020	Innocent Boy	Writer/Director	TV Short
2020	Endless Sunshine on a Cloudy Day	Writer/Director	Documentary
2020	Eden	Writer/Director	Short
2022	Maced	Producer	Short
2022	Sneachta	Producer	Short
2022	Mary Martin & Ben	Producer	Short
2022	Agape	Executive Producer	Short
2022	The Black Guelph	Writer/Director	Feature
2024	Sicár	Executive Producer	Short
2025	Crazy Love	Producer	Feature
2025	Where The Road Meets The Sky	Writer/Director/Producer	Documentary
2025	Another Day	Producer	Short
2026	A Traveller Family	Producer	Documentary
2026	Murphy vs Christmas	Producer	Feature
	Zemblanity	Director	Post-Production

== Awards and nominations ==
Year	Award	Category	Nominated work	Result	Ref.
2015	Irish Film and Television Awards	Best Actor in a Supporting Role - Drama	Love/Hate	Nominated	
2017	Manchester Film Festival	Best Actor	Cardboard Gangsters	Won	
2017	Dublin Film Critics Circle Awards	Best Actor	Cardboard Gangsters	Nominated	
2018	Irish Film and Television Awards	Best Actor in a Lead Role - Film	Cardboard Gangsters	Won	
2018	Irish Film and Television Awards	Best Documentary Series	John Connors: The Travellers	Won	
2020	Dublin International Film Festival	Audience Choice Awards	Endless Sunshine on a Cloudy Day	Won	
2022	Oldenburg Film Festival	Best Film	The Black Geulph	Won	
2025	Oldenburg Film Festival	Best Actor	Crazy Love	Won	
