= Peter Coonan =

Irish actor (born 1984)

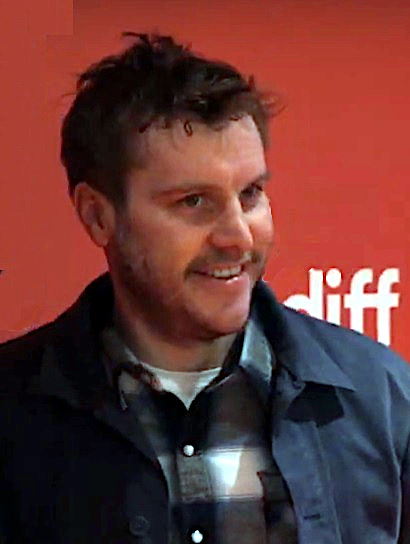
- Coonan at diff 2020
- Born: 1984 (age 41–42); Dublin, Ireland
- Occupation: Actor
- Years active: 2000–present
- Children: 3

Peter Coonan (born 1984) is an Irish actor, notable for his roles in King of the Travellers (2012), and Love/Hate (2011–2014), for which he won Best Actor in a Supporting Role – Television at the 11th Irish Film & Television Awards. Other credits include Penance (2018), Dublin Murders (2019), Arracht (2020), The Alienist: Angel of Darkness (2020), Cold Courage (2020), Doineann (2021), Peaky Blinders (2022), and Bad Sisters (2022).

== Career ==
His first notable role was in 2011, when he played Dave 'Dots' Fennel in the Irish crime film Between the Canals. and as Mickey Moorehouse in King of the Travellers (2012). He played a main role as Fran Cooney in the RTÉ One series Love/Hate (2011–2014), for which he won Best Actor in a Supporting Role – Television at the 11th Irish Film & Television Awards.

In 2022 he appeared as Connor Dunn in Peaky Blinders, and as Ben in Bad Sisters.

== Personal life ==
In May 2014, Coonan's girlfriend, Kim O'Driscoll, gave birth to their baby girl, Beth, at the National Maternity Hospital, Dublin.

They became engaged in 2015. In 2017 their daughter Katie was born.

== Filmography ==
=== Film ===
Year	Title	Role	Notes
2000	Saltwater	Rooney	
2010	Salt	Vince	Short film
2011	Between the Canals	Dave "Dots" Fennel	
2012	Stalker	Uncle Rudyard	
2012	What Richard Did	Bouncer	
2012	King of the Travellers	Mickey Moorehouse	
2012	What Richard Did	Bouncer	
2012	Redline	Sean	Short film
2013	Doghouse	Doug Stepon	Short film
2013	A Thousand Times Good Night	Father 2	
2014	Jack and Ralph Plan a Murder	Pimp	
2014	Get Up & Go	Alex	
2014	Deadly	Boney	Short film
2014	The Guarantee	David Drumm	
2015	City of Roses	The Narrator	Short film
2016	Gridlock	Rory	Short film
2017	The Drummer and the Keeper	Toss	
2018	Penance	Father Eoin O'Donnell (young)	Irish language
2018	The Belly of the Whale	Rooster Collins	
2018	We Have Always Lived in the Castle	Bobby Dunham	
2018	Earthly Shadows	Padraig	Short film
2019	Dark Lies the Island	Doggy Mannion	
2019	Arracht	Bailey	Irish language
2020	Older	The Wise Man	
2021	Doineann	Tomás	Irish language; nominated for IFTA
2023	The Gates	George Sheppard	
2024	King Frankie	Frankie	Lead role
2024	Kathleen Is Here	Rory	
2024	Amongst the Wolves	Judge	
2025	Surviving Earth	Duncan	
2025	Trad	Des McAnally	
2025	Dear Erin	Paddy	Lead role
2026	Hokum	Mal	

=== Television ===
Year	Title	Role	Notes
2011–2014	Love/Hate	Francis "Fran" Cooney	24 episodes
2012	Talk It Out	Doctor Garry	2 episodes
2013	An Crisis	Sean Sheehan	Episode: 'Das Boot'
2014	Quirke	Brendan Boyle	Episode: 'Christine Falls'
2016	Wrecking the Rising	Sean Purcell	3 episodes
2016	Je Mo Peil	Himself	4 part Irish language documentary with Lochlann Ó Mearáin about Euro 2016
2019	Dublin Murders	John Naylor	2 episodes
2020	The Alienist: Angel of Darkness	Ding Dong	5 episodes
2020	Cold Courage	Paddy	8 episodes
2021	Hidden Assets	Fionn Brannigan	6 episodes
2022	Peaky Blinders	Connor Dunn	2 episodes
2022	Bad Sisters	Ben	7 episodes
