= List of films set in Ireland =

'Films set in a country' differ from 'films shot in a country' and a 'film's nationality'. In films set in a country, the story depicts the characters/action situated/located in a said country. While in some films the action is set in multiple countries, in others it is set in one specific country. Some films that are set in a country may not necessarily be shot in that country and/or are not produced from that country. This is a list of films set in Ireland, meaning the films in this list depict their characters as being located in Ireland. While the majority of the films listed are Irish films, others are not, such as Hungry Hill (1947) (British), The Black Sheep (1960) (German), The Craic (1999) (Australian), and Hellboy II: The Golden Army (2008) (United States). The same applies with, while the majority of films were shot in Ireland, others were not, such as The Naked Truth (1957) (Irish scene filmed at Pinewood Studios in the United Kingdom), The Long Good Friday (1980), (scene in pub at start of film shot in United Kingdom), The Brylcreem Boys (1998) and Waking Ned (1998) (both filmed entirely on the Isle of Man), and The Boondock Saints II: All Saints Day (2009) (filmed entirely in Canada, including Irish portion). The list is categorised into sections consisting of Feature Films, Short Films, Documentary Films and Mini-Series set in Ireland, and the films are listed alphabetically. There is also a section of a short list of films shot, but not set in Ireland listed at the bottom. These lists are not exhaustive.

== Feature films ==
=== Numbers ===
- 32A (2007)
- '71 (2014)

=== A ===
- The Abduction Club (2002)
- About Adam (2000)
- Accelerator (1999)
- The Actors (2003)
- Adam & Paul (2004)
- Agnes Browne (1999)
- Ailsa (1994)
- Aisha (2022)
- Alarm (2008)
- Albert Nobbs (2011)
- Alive and Kicking (1959)
- All You Need Is Death (2023)
- Among the Irish Fisher Folk (1911)
- An Bronntanas (The Gift) (2014)
- And No One Could Save Her (1973)
- Angel (1982) - also called Danny Boy
- Angela's Ashes (1999)
- Anne Devlin (1984)
- Another Shore (1948)
- Anton (2008)
- Apocalypse Clown (2023)
- Arracht (2019)
- Arrah-na-Pogue (1911)
- Ascendancy (1982)
- Attracta (1983)

=== B ===
- Bad Day for the Cut (2017)
- The Ballroom of Romance (1982)
- Baltimore (2023)
- Banshee Blacktop, An Irish Ghost Story (2016)
- The Banshees of Inisherin (2022)
- Barber (2023)
- Barry Lyndon (1975)
- Battle of the Bone (2008)
- A Belfast Story (2013)
- Beloved Enemy (1936)
- A Bend in the River (2021)
- Between the Canals (2010)
- Bipedality (2010)
- Black 47 (2018)
- Blackbird (2018)
- The Black Sheep (1960)
- The Bloodsucker Leads the Dance (1975)
- Bloody Sunday (2002)
- Bloom (2003)
- Bogwoman (1997)
- The Boondock Saints II: All Saints Day (2009)
- Borstal Boy (2000)
- Boxed (2002)
- The Boxer (1997)
- Boy Eats Girl (2005)
- The Boy from Mercury (1996)
- The Boys from County Clare (2003) - also called The Boys and Girl from County Clare (US) and The Great Ceili War (UK)
- Boys from County Hell (2020)
- Breakfast on Pluto (2005)
- Bring Them Down (2024)
- Broken Law (2020)
- Brooklyn (2015)
- Broth of a Boy (1959)
- The Brylcreem Boys (1998) - set in Ireland, filmed on the Isle of Man
- The Butcher Boy (1997)

=== C ===
- Cal (1984)
- Calm with Horses (2019)
- Calvary (2014)
- The Canal (2014)
- Captain Boycott (1947)
- Captain Lightfoot (1955)
- Cardboard Gangsters (2017)
- Casey's Millions (1922)
- Catholics (1973) - also Called Conflict, A Fable of the Future and The Visitor
- The Cellar (2022)
- Chasing Leprechauns (2012)
- Cherrybomb (2009)
- Christy (2025)
- Circle of Friends (1995)
- The Clash of the Ash (1987)
- Closing the Ring (2007)
- The Colleen Bawn (1924)
- The Commitments (1991)
- The Country Girls (1984)
- The Courier (1988)
- Cowboys & Angels (2003)
- The Craic (1999)
- Cré na Cille (2007)
- A Christmas Star (2015)
- Cruiskeen Lawn (1922)
- Cry of the Innocent (1980)
- The Crying Game (1992)
- The Cured (2017)

=== D ===
- Da (1988)
- Dancing at Lughnasa (1998)
- Darby O'Gill and the Little People (1959)
- A Date for Mad Mary (2016)
- Dating Amber (2020)
- Daughter of Darkness (1948)
- The Dawn (1936) - also called Dawn Over Ireland
- The Dawning (1988)
- The Dead (1987)
- Dead Along the Way (2016)
- Dead Bodies (2003)
- Deadly Cuts (2021)
- Dead Man's Evidence (1962)
- Dead Meat (2004)
- Dear Sarah (1990)
- December Bride (1991)
- The Delinquent Season (2018)
- Dementia 13 (1963)
- Der Irland-Krimi: Die Toten von Glenmore Abbey (The Ireland Crime Mystery: The Dead of Glenmore Abbey) (2019)
- The Devil's Doorway (2018)
- The Dig (2018)
- The Disappearance of Finbar (1996)
- Disco Pigs (2001)
- Divorcing Jack (1998)
- Doineann (2021)
- Dorothy Mills (2008)
- Double Blind (2023)
- Doughboys in Ireland (1943)
- Draíocht (1996)
- Dublin Oldschool (2018)
- Durango (1999)

=== E ===
- Eamon (2009)
- Eat the Peach (1986)
- The Early Bird (1936)
- The Eclipse (2009)
- Elephant (1989)
- The Eliminator (1997)
- Eliot & Me (2012)
- Eliza Lynch: Queen of Paraguay (2013)
- Ellie (2016)
- Ek Tha Tiger (2012)
- Enchantment (1920)
- Er kann's nicht lassen (He can't stop doing it) (1962)
- The Eternal (1998)
- Evelyn (2003)
- Evil Breed: The Legend of Samhain (2003)
- An Everlasting Piece (2000)

=== F ===
- Faeries (1981)
- The Fantasist (1986)
- Far and Away (1992)
- Fatal Deviation (1998)
- The Field (1990)
- Fifty Dead Men Walking (2008)
- The Fighting O'Flynn (1949)
- A Fighting Man (2014)
- The Fighting Prince of Donegal (1966)
- A Film with Me in It (2008)
- Finian's Rainbow (1968)
- Five Minutes of Heaven (2009)
- Flick (2000)
- Flight of the Doves (1971)
- Float Like a Butterfly (2018)
- Flora and Son (2023)
- Fools of Fortune (1990)
- The Foreigner (2017)
- Foscadh (2021)
- Four Days in July (1984)
- Four Letters of Love (2024)
- Four Mothers (2024)
- The Fox of Glenarvon (1940)
- The Foxes of Harrow (1947)
- Frank (2014)
- Frankie Starlight (1995)
- Fran the Man (2025)
- Freeze Frame (2004)
- Frewaka (2024)
- From the Dark (2014)
- The Front Line (2006)
- A Further Gesture (1997) - also called The Break

=== G ===
- Garage (2007)
- The General (1998)
- General John Regan (1921)
- General John Regan (1933)
- The Gentle Gunman (1952)
- Ghostwood (2006)
- A Girl from Mogadishu (2020)
- Girls & Boys (2025)
- Girl with Green Eyes (1964)
- Giro City (1982)
- Glassland (2014)
- God's Creatures (2022)
- Gold (2014)
- Goldfish Memory (2003)
- Good Vibrations (2013)
- Gorgo (1961)
- Grabbers (2012)
- The Guarantee (2014)
- The Guard (2011)
- Guests of the Nation (1935)
- Guns in the Heather (1969) - also called The Secret of Boyne Castle and Spy-Busters

=== H ===
- H3 (2001)
- The Hallow (2015) - originally titled The Woods
- Handsome Devil (2016)
- Hangman's House (1928)
- Halo Effect (2004)
- Happy Ever After (1954)
- Happy Ever Afters (2009)
- The Hardy Bucks Movie (2013)
- Haywire (2011)
- He (2012)
- Headrush (2003)
- Hear My Song (1992)
- Helen (2008)
- Hellboy II: The Golden Army (2008)
- Hennessy (1975)
- Here Are the Young Men (2020)
- Herself (2020)
- Hidden Agenda (1990)
- Hideaways (2011)
- High Boot Benny (1993)
- The High Command (1937)
- High Spirits (1988)
- Hole in the Head (2022)
- The Hole in the Ground (2019)
- Holy Cross (2003)
- Holy Water (2009) also called Hard Times
- Home Is the Hero (1959)
- Honeymoon for One (2011)
- How About You (2007)
- How Harry Became a Tree (2001)
- How to Be Happy (2013)
- How to Cheat in the Leaving Certificate (1998)
- Hunger (2008)
- Hungry Hill (1947)

=== I ===
- I See a Dark Stranger (1946)
- I Was Happy Here (1966)
- I Went Down (1997)
- The Iguana with the Tongue of Fire (1971)
- Images (1972)
- In Fear (2013)
- In the Days of St Patrick (1920)
- In the Land of Saints and Sinners (2023)
- In the Name of the Father (1993)
- The Informer (1929)
- The Informer (1935)
- The Informant (1997)
- The Innocent Lie (1916)
- The Inside (2012)
- Inside I'm Dancing (2004)
- Intermission (2003)
- Into the West (1992)
- Ireland a Nation (1914)
- Irish and Proud of It (1936)
- Irish Destiny (1926)
- Irish for Luck (1936)
- Irish Hearts (1934)
- The Irish Honeymoon (1911)
- The Irish in America (1915)
- Irish Jam (2006)
- Irish Wish (2024)
- Island of Terror (1966)
- Isolation (2005)
- It Is in Us All (2022)

=== J ===
- Jacqueline (1956)
- Jimmy's Hall (2014)
- Johnny Was (2005)
- Joyce in June (1982)
- Joyride (2022)
- Jump (2012)
- Juno and the Paycock (1930)

=== K ===
- Kathleen Is Here (2024)
- Kathleen Mavourneen (1937)
- The Key (1934)
- Killing Bono (2011)
- The Killing of a Sacred Deer (2017)
- Kings (2007)
- King of the Travellers (2012)
- Kisses (2008)
- Kissing Candice (2017)
- Kneecap (2024)
- Knocknagow (1918)
- Korea (1996)

=== L ===
- The Lads (2018)
- Lakelands (2022)
- Lamb (1985)
- Langrishe, Go Down (1978)
- The Last Leprechaun (1998)
- The Last of the High Kings (1996) - also called Summer Fling
- The Last Rifleman (2023)
- The Last September (1999)
- The Last Unicorn (1982)
- Laws of Attraction (2004)
- Leap Year (2010)
- Leapin' Leprechauns! (1995)
- Legend of the Bog (2009) - also called Assault of Darkness
- Leprechaun 2 (1994)
- Leprechaun: Origins (2014)
- Let the Wrong One In (2021)
- Life's a Breeze (2013)
- Light Years Away (1981)
- Lily of Killarney (1929)
- Lily of Killarney (1934)
- Linen from Ireland (1939)
- Little Nellie Kelly (1940)
- Little White Lie (2008)
- The Lobster (2015)
- The Lodgers (2017)
- The Lonely Passion of Judith Hearne (1987)
- The Long Good Friday (1980)
- The Lost City of Z (film) (2016)
- Love and Rage (1998)
- A Love Divided (1999)
- Love, Rosie (2014)
- The Luck of the Irish (1936)
- The Luck of the Irish (1948)
- The Luck of the Irish (2001)

=== M ===
- The Mackintosh Man (1973)
- Mad About Mambo (2000)
- The Magdalene Sisters (2002)
- Man About Dog (2004)
- Man of Aran (1934)
- Man Dancin' (2003)
- A Man of No Importance (1994)
- Mammal (2016)
- The Matchmaker (1997)
- Maeve (1981)
- Mapmaker (2001)
- The March Hare (1956 film) (1956)
- Maze (2017)
- The Medallion (2003)
- Men of Ireland (1938)
- Metal Heart (2018)
- The Mighty Celt (2005)
- Mission: Impossible – Fallout (2018)
- Moondance (1995)
- The Most Fertile Man in Ireland (1999)
- Mountains O'Mourne (1938)
- Michael Collins (1996)
- Michael Inside (2017)
- Mickybo and Me (2004)
- The Miracle (1991)
- The Miracle Club (2023)
- Mrs. Brown's Boys D'Movie (2014)
- My Brother's War (1997)
- My Friend Joe (1995)
- My Hands Are Clay (1948)
- My Irish Molly (1938)
- My Left Foot (1989)
- My Life for Ireland (1941)
- My Name Is Emily (2015)
- My Sailor, My Love (2022)

=== N ===
- Nails (2007)
- Naked Massacre (1976)
- The Naked Truth (1957)
- The Nephew (1998)
- Night Boat to Dublin (1946)
- Night People (2015)
- Night Train (1998)
- A Nightingale Falling (2014)
- No Resting Place (1951)
- Noble (2014)
- Nocebo (2022)
- Nora (2000)
- Nothing Personal (1995)
- Nothing Personal (2009)
- November Afternoon (1996)

=== O ===
- Oddity (2024)
- Odd Man Out (1947)
- Oh, Mr. Porter! (1937)
- Omagh (2004)
- On a Paving Stone Mounted (1978)
- On the Edge (2001)
- On the Nose (2001)
- One Hundred Mornings (2009)
- Once (2006)
- Ondine (2010)
- Only Human (2010)
- Only the Wind (1961)
- Ordinary Decent Criminal (2000)
- The Oracle (1953)
- Ourselves Alone (1936)
- The Outsider (1980)

=== P ===
- Paddy the Next Best Thing (1923)
- Paddy the Next Best Thing (1933)
- Parked (2011)
- Parnell (1937)
- Patrick's Day (2014)
- Patriots (1994)
- Patriot Games (1992)
- Pavee Lackeen (2005)
- Pay the Ghost (2015)
- Peacefire (2008)
- Peg o' My Heart (1933)
- Penance (2018)
- Perrier's Bounty (2009)
- Pete's Meteor (2002)
- Philomena (2013)
- The Pier (2011)
- Pilgrimage (2017)
- Pixie (2020)
- The Playboy of the Western World (1962)
- The Playboys (1992)
- A Portrait of the Artist as a Young Man (1977)
- Plague Town (2008)
- The Plough and the Stars (1936)
- Poitín (1978)
- Poster Boys (2020)
- Professor Tim (1957)
- P.S. I Love You (2007)
- A Prayer for the Dying (1987)
- The Private Lives of Elizabeth and Essex (1939)
- The Problem with People (2023)
- Puckoon (2002)
- Puffball (2007)
- The Purple Taxi (1977)
- Pursuit (2015)

=== Q ===
- Quackser Fortune Has a Cousin in the Bronx (1970)
- The Quare Fellow (1962)
- A Quiet Day in Belfast (1974)
- The Quiet Girl (2022) - also called An Cailín Ciúin
- The Quiet Man (1952)

=== R ===
- Rat (2000)
- Rawhead Rex (1986)
- Re-creation (2025)
- Redemption of a Rogue (2020)
- Red Roses and Petrol (2003)
- Reefer and the Model (1988)
- Reflections (1984)
- Resurrection Man (1998)
- Rialto (2019)
- The Rising of the Moon (1957)
- Róise & Frank (2022)
- Rooney (1958)
- Rose of Tralee (1937)
- Rose Plays Julie (2019)
- Rosie (2018)
- Round Ireland with a Fridge (2010)
- Run & Jump (2013)
- Ryan's Daughter (1970)

=== S ===
- Saints and Sinners (1949)
- Saltwater (2000)
- Sanctuary (2016)
- Scream of the Banshee (2011)
- The Sea (2013)
- Sea Fever (2019)
- Secret of the Cave (2006)
- The Secret of Kells (2009)
- The Secret of Roan Inish (1994)
- Secret People (1952)
- The Secret Scripture (2016)
- Sensation (2010)
- September Says (2024)
- The Seventh Stream (2001)
- Shadow Dancer (2012)
- The Shadow of a Gunman (1972)
- The Shadow of a Gunman (1995)
- Shake Hands with the Devil (1959)
- Shamus (1958)
- She Creature (2001)
- Shergar (1999)
- A Shine of Rainbows (2009)
- Shrooms (2007)
- The Siege of Sidney Street (1960)
- Silence (2012)
- Silent Grace (2004)
- Sing Street (2016)
- Sinners (2002)
- Small Things like These (2024)
- The Snapper (1993)
- Some Mother's Son (1996)
- Song for a Raggy Boy (2003)
- Song of the Sea (2014)
- Soulsmith (2017)
- Spectre (1996)
- Speed Dating (2007)
- Spellbreaker: Secret of the Leprechauns (1996)
- Spin The Bottle (2004)
- The Spirit of St. Louis (1957)
- Spring Meeting (1941)
- St. Patrick: The Irish Legend (2000)
- The Stag (2013)
- Standby (2014)
- Stan and Ollie (2018)
- Steamin' + Dreamin': The Grandmaster Cash Story (2009)
- Steamin' + Dreamin' 2: Cash Back (2011)
- Stella Days (2011)
- The Strangers Came (1949)
- Strength and Honour (2007)
- Studs (2006)
- Summer of the Flying Saucer (2008)
- Sunday (2002)
- Sweety Barrett (1998)

=== T ===
- Taffin (1988)
- An Taibhse (2024)
- Tara Road (2005)
- A Terrible Beauty (1960) - also called The Night Fighters
- That They May Face the Rising Sun (2023)
- This Is My Father (1998)
- This Is The Sea (1997)
- This Other Eden (1959)
- Titanic Town (1999)
- Three Wise Women (2010)
- Three Wishes for Jamie (1987)
- The Tiger's Tail (2006)
- Treasure Island (1938)
- The Treaty (1991)
- Tristan & Isolde (2006)
- Trojan Eddie (1996)
- Trouble with Sex (2005)
- Twig (2024)

=== U ===
- Ulysses (1967)
- Untamed (1955)

=== V ===
- The Van (1996)
- Veronica Guerin (2003)
- A Very Unlucky Leprechaun (1998)
- The Vicar of Bray (1937)
- The Violent Enemy (1968)

=== W ===
- Waiting for Dublin (2007)
- Wake Wood (2011)
- Waking Ned (1998) - also called Waking Ned Devine; filmed on the Isle of Man
- War of the Buttons (1994)
- A War of Children (1972)
- The Watchers (2024)
- Watermelon (2003)
- W.C. (2009)
- Wee Lady Betty (1917)
- What If (2013) - also called The F Word
- What Richard Did (2012)
- When Brendan Met Trudy (2001)
- When the Sky Falls (2000)
- White Pony (1999)
- Whole Lotta Sole (2012)
- Widows' Peak (1994)
- The Wind That Shakes the Barley (2006)
- Wild About Harry (2000)
- Wildfire (2020)
- Wild Mountain Thyme (2020)
- Willy Reilly and His Colleen Bawn (1920)
- Winter's End (2005)
- The Winter Lake (2020)
- Without Name (2016)
- Wolf (2021)
- Wolfwalkers (2020)
- Words Upon the Window Pane (1994)

=== Y ===
- The Yank (2014)
- You Are Not My Mother (2021)
- You Can't Fool an Irishman (1949)
- Yesterday's Children (2000)
- You Are Not My Mother (2021)
- You, Me & Marley (1992)
- Young Cassidy (1965)
- The Young Offenders (2016)

=== Z ===
- Zoetrope (2011)
- Zonad (2009)
- Zoo (2017)

== Short films ==
- All for Old Ireland (1915)
- An Ranger (The Ranger) (2008)
- Bold Emmett Ireland's Martyr (1915)
- The Boogeyman (2010)
- The Colleen Bawn (1911)
- Come Back to Erin (1914)
- Conway, the Kerry Dancer (1912)
- The Crush (2010)
- Dance Lexie Dance (1996)
- The Eye of the Government (1914)
- Far From Erin's Isle (1912)
- The Fishermaid of Ballydavid (1911)
- For Ireland's Sake (1914)
- His Mother (1912)
- History of Cinema (2008)
- Hostage (1984)
- The Hungry Grass (1981)
- I Dreamt I Woke Up (1991)
- Ireland, the Oppressed (1912)
- The Kerry Gow (1912)
- The Lad from Old Ireland (1910)
- The Lady Peggy's Escape (1913)
- The Long Way Home (1995)
- The Mayor From Ireland (1912)
- O'Neil of the Glen (1916)
- The O'Neill (1912)
- Oidhche Sheanchais (A Night of Storytelling) (1935)
- Paying the Rent (1920)
- Pretty Polly (1957)
- Return to Glennascaul (1951)
- Riders to the Sea (1935)
- Rory O'More (1911)
- Setanta - The Boy cú chulainn (1999)
- The Shaughraun (1912)
- The Vagabonds (1912)
- When Love Came to Gavin Burke (1917)
- The Wives of Jamestown (1913)
- You Remember Ellen (1912)
- Yu Ming Is Ainm Dom (2003)

== Documentary films set in Ireland ==
=== Numbers ===
- 1798 and After (1998) - Documentary with 5 episodes and produced by Channel 4
- 1916: The Irish Rebellion (2016)
- The 34th (2018)
- 50,000 Secret Journeys (1994)

=== A ===
- Above the Law (2015) - Documentary episode by RTÉ Investigation Unit and produced by RTÉ
- Achieving Freedom (2011)
- The Age of De Valera (1982) - Documentary with 4 episodes
- An Conradh 1921 (The Treaty 1921) (2011) - Produced by TG4
- An Deichniúr Dearmadta (The Forgotten Ten) (2002) - Produced by TG4
- An Independent People (2013) - Documentary with 3 episodes and produced by BBC Northern Ireland
- Atlantean (2005) - Documentary with 4 episodes
- Atlantic (2016)

=== B ===
- Ballymun Lullaby (2011)
- The Ballymurphy Massacre (2012)
- The Ballymurphy Precedent (2018)
- Battle of the Bogside (2004)
- Behind the Mask (1991)
- Being AP (2015)
- Belfast: No Peace on the Streets (1993)
- Beneath a Dublin Sky (2006)
- Bertie (2008) - Documentary with 4 episodes
- Blazing the Trail: The O'Kalems in Ireland (2011)
- Blind Vision (2007)
- Blood Fruit (2014)
- Blood of the Irish (2009) - Documentary with 2 episodes
- Bobby Sands: 66 Days (2016)
- The Boys of St Columb's (2009)
- Bomb Squad Men: The Long Walk (2012)
- Born and Reared (2016)
- Brigid's Night: La 'Le Bride (1961) - Documentary episode by Radharc and produced by the RTÉ
- A Bright Brand New Day (1982)
- Broken Song (2013)

=== C ===
- Cardinal Secrets (2002) - Documentary episode by Prime Time and produced by RTÉ
- Charles Haughey's Ireland (1986) - Produced by Pipeline for Channel 4
- The Charlton Years (1996)
- Children at Work (1973)
- Children in Crossfire (1974)
- Children of the Revolution (2016) Produced by RTÉ
- Citizen Lane (2018)
- A City Dreaming (2014)
- Collins & De Valera: Heroes & Villains (2016)
- Collusion (2015) - Documentary episode by Panorama and produced by the BBC
- Cradle of Genius (1961)
- Croagh Patrick: Mass Rock & Men's Sodality (1962) - Documentary episode by Radharc and produced by the RTÉ
- Cromwell: Conquering the Emerald Isle 1641-1650 (2005) - Documentary episode for The Conquerors by History Channel
- Cromwell in Ireland (2008)
- The Crest (2017)
- Curious Journey (1974) - Banned until 1980
- Customs (2008) - Documentary with 6 episodes

=== D ===
- Dangerous Liaisons (2004) - Documentary episode by Spotlight and produced by the BBC
- The Day mountbatten Died (2019) - BBC Documentary
- Death on the Rock (1988) - Documentary episode by This Week and produced by Thames Television
- Dolores Keane: A Storm in the Heart (2014)
- Dirty Money: The Story of the Criminal Assets Bureau (2008) - Documentary with 6 episodes
- The Disappeared (2013)
- Discovery (1964)
- A Doctor's Sword (2015)
- Dreaming the Quiet Man (2010)
- The Dublin-Monaghan Bombings 1974 (1993) - Documentary episode by First Tuesday and produced by Yorkshire Television
- Dying for a Drink (1983) - Documentary episode by Radharc and produced by the RTÉ

=== E ===
- Éamon de Valera: Ireland's Hated Hero (1999) - Documentary episode by Reputations and produced by BBC
- Easter 1916: The Enemy Files (2016) - Documentary episode presented by Michael Portillo and co-produced by RTÉ and BBC
- The Emerald Diamond (2006)

=== F ===
- Face-Off: De Valera v Churchill (2007) - Documentary episode by Hidden History and produced by RTÉ
- Family Fortune: De Valera and the Irish Press (2004) - Documentary episode by Hidden History and produced by RTÉ
- Famine to Freedom (2003) - Produced by Discovery Channel
- Fintona, A Study of Housing Discrimination (1953)
- The Forgotten Irish (2009) - Produced by TV3 Ireland
- The Franciscan Friars of Killarney (1911)
- Frederick Douglass and the White Negro (2008)
- Freefall (2010) - - Documentary with 2 episodes and produced by RTÉ
- Frongoch: Coláiste na Réabhlóide (Frongoch: University of Revolution) (2007) - Produced by TG4

=== G ===
- Gabriel Byrne: Stories from Home (2008)
- Get Collins: The Intelligence War in Dublin (2007)
- The Ghost of Roger Casement (2002)
- The Great Famine (1995) - BBC Documentary
- Green Is the Colour (2012) - Produced by RTÉ
- Growing Up Gay (2010) - Documentary with 2 episodes

=== H ===
- Hands (1978-1989) - Documentary series with 37 episodes
- Hang Up Your Brightest Colours (1973) - Banned by Independent Broadcasting Authority until 1993
- Harry Clarke – Darkness in Light (2003)
- Haughey (2005) - Documentary with 4 episodes
- Hawks and Doves: The Crown and Ireland's War of Independence (2020) - also called The Enemy Files II - Documentary with 2 episodes presented by Michael Portillo and produced by Midas Productions for RTÉ, BBC and Oireachtas TV
- The Hills of Ireland (1951)
- His & Hers (2009)
- Home Rule (1995) - Documentary with 5 episodes and produced by BBC Northern Ireland
- How to Defuse a Bomb: The Project Children Story (2016)
- How We Blew the Boom (2009) - Produced by RTÉ
- Hume (2011) - Produced by BBC Northern Ireland
- The Hunger (2020)

=== I ===
- I Am Belfast (2015)
- I Dreamt I Woke Up (1991)
- If Lynch Had Invaded (2009) - RTÉ produced documentary
- Illegal Moneylending (1969) - Documentary episode by 7 Days and produced by RTÉ, documentary lead to a tribunal of inquiry
- In Search of the Pope's Children (2006) - Documentary with 3 episodes
- In Sunshine or in Shadow (2010)
- Ireland: 'The Emerald Isle' (1934)
- Ireland: A Television History (1980) - Multi-award-winning documentary by Robert Kee
- Ireland's Great Hunger and the Irish Diaspora (2016)
- Ireland's Greatest (2010)
- Ireland's Nazis (2007) - Documentary episode by Hidden History and produced by RTÉ
- Ireland's Pickpockets (2012)
- The Irish in America (1995) - Produced by History Channel
- The Irish Pub (2013)

=== J ===
- J.P. Dunleavy's Ireland: In All Her Sins and Graces (1992) - Produced by Discovery Channel
- Jack Charlton: The Irish Years (2005)
- James Joyce: 1882-1941 (2004) - Produced by The Biography Channel
- Jimmy's Winnin' Matches (2013)
- Joshua Greer’s Amazing Irish Adventure (2012)

=== K ===
- The Killings at Coolacrease (2007) - Documentary episode by Hidden History and produced by RTÉ
- Knuckle (2011)

=== L ===
- Lethal Force (1990) - Documentary episode by Panorama and produced by the BBC
- A Little Bit TV (2012) - Documentary with 8 episodes
- The Longest Decade (1978) - Produced by Ulster Television
- Lost Lives (2019) - Produced by BBC Northern Ireland
- A Lost Son (2012) - Produced by RTÉ

=== M ===
- The Madness From Within (1998) - Documentary produced by RTÉ and later found to contain a number of distortions on facts from the Irish Civil War
- The Making of 'The Quiet Man' (1992
- Marooned (2004)
- Mary McAleese and the Man Who Saved Europe (2015)
- Massacre at Ballymurphy (2018) - Documentary episode by Dispatches and produced by Channel 4
- Mattress Men (2016)
- The Maze (2002)
- Men at Lunch (2012)
- Micko (2018)
- Mise Éire (1959)
- Mission to Prey (2011) - Documentary episode by Prime Time Investigates and produced by RTÉ - later found to have made multiple false allegations
- More Than a Sacrifice (1995)
- A Mother Brings Her Son to Be Shot (2017)
- Mother Ireland (1991)
- Mountbatten: Death of a Royal (2013) - Produced by RTÉ

=== N ===
- Na Chéad Fight Clubs (The First Fight Clubs) (2010) - Produced by TG4
- Ná Lig Sinn i nDearmad (Lest We Be Forgotten) (2003) - Documentary episode by Léargas (Insight) and produced by RTÉ
- No Béarla (2007) - Documentary with 4 episodes
- Obama: the Road to Moneygall (2011)
- No Stone Unturned (2017)

=== O ===
- Ó Pheann an Phiarsaigh: The Writings of Patrick Pearse (2010) - Produced by TG4
- The O'Kalems Visit Killarney (1912)
- Oisín (1970)
- Old Scores (1983)
- Older Than Ireland (2015)
- One Million Dubliners (2014)
- Open Port (1968) - Documentary episode by Radharc and produced by the RTÉ

=== P ===
- P.H. Pearse: Fanatic Heart (2001) - Documentary episode by True Lives and produced by RTÉ
- Paddy The Cope: Templecrone Co-op (1962) - Documentary episode by Radharc and produced by the RTÉ
- Paisley: From Troublemaker to Peacemaker (2008) - Produced by RTÉ
- Patrick: The Renegade Saint (2012) - Produced by RTÉ
- The Patriot Game (2007) - Produced by TG4
- The Peacemaker (2016)
- The Pipe (2010)
- Players of the Faithful (2018)
- The Pressure Cooker (2008)

=== Q ===
- The Queen of Ireland (2015)

=== R ===
- Reeling in the Years (1999 - 2010) - 48 episodes of archival footage on news events from the 1962 to 2010
- The Reluctant Taoiseach (2010) - Produced by RTÉ
- The Miami Showband Massacre (2019) - Documentary episode by ReMastered and produced by Netflix
- Revolutions (2016)
- R I C: The Forgotten Force (2004) - Produced by RTÉ
- The Road to Nowhere (1971) - Documentary episode by Radharc and produced by the RTÉ
- Rocky Road to Dublin (1967)
- Roger Casement - Heart of Darkness (1992)
- Roll Up Your Sleeves (2008)
- Rough Rider (2014)

=== S ===
- Salmon Run with Jack Charlton (1994)
- School Life (2016)
- Seaview (2007)
- Searching for Shergar (2018)
- See You at the Pillar (1967)
- Seven Ages (2000) - Documentary with seven episodes
- Sex & Sensibility (2008) - Documentary with 4 episodes
- Sex in a Cold Climate (1998)
- The Shame of the Catholic Church (2012) - Documentary episode by This World and produced by BBC
- Shamrock and Swastika (2001)
- Skin in the Game (2012)
- Spotlight on the Troubles: A Secret History (2019) - Documentary with seven episodes & behind the scenes episode
- The Spy in the IRA (2017) - Documentary episode by Panorama and produced by BBC
- A State Apart (1995) - Documentary with 5 episodes and produced by BBC Northern Ireland
- States of Fear (1999)
- The Story of Ireland (2011) Documentary with 5 episodes
- Study Ireland (1990) - Documentary with 8 episodes and produced by BBC Northern Ireland
- Suffer Little Children (1994) – Documentary episode by Counterpoint and produced by UTV
- Sweepstakes (2003) - Documentary episode by Hidden History and produced by RTÉ

=== T ===
- Taoiseach (2009) - Documentary with 4 episodes and Produced by TV3 Ireland
- A Terrible Beauty... (2013) - Produced by RTÉ
- Theobald Wolfe Tone (????) - Documentary by Kenneth Griffith completed but not published .
- Til the Tenth Generation (2009)
- To Kill the Cabinet (1986)

=== U ===
- The Ulster Covenant (2012) - Produced by BBC Northern Ireland
- Ulster Unearthed (1997) - Documentary with 5 episodes and produced by UTV for Channel 4
- Unbreakable (2014)
- Unquiet Graves (2018)

=== W ===
- The Wall (2016)
- Waveriders (2008)
- Whatever You Say, Say Nothing (1995) - Co-produced by ZDF & 3sat (German) in English language
- When Ali Came to Ireland (2012)
- When Charlie Met Kitty (2011) - Documentary episode by Scannal (Scandal) and produced by RTÉ & TG4
- When Ireland Starved (1992) - Documentary with 4 episodes by Radharc and produced by the RTÉ
- Wild Ireland: The Edge of the World (2017)
- Who Bombed Birmingham? (1991)

=== Y ===
- Yeats Country (1965)
- The Year London Blew Up: 1974 (2005) - Documentary produced by Channel 4
- Yes I Can (2011) - Documentary with 4 episodes
- Young Offender (1963) - Documentary episode by Radharc and produced by the RTÉ

== Television mini-series set in Ireland ==
- Acceptable Risk (2017)
- Act of Betrayal (1988)
- Against the Wind (1978) - Irish and Australian settings
- An Crisis (The Crisis) (2010)
- Amber (2014)
- Amongst Women (1998)
- The Bombmaker (2001)
- Captains & Kings (1976) - story of an Irish immigrant family)
- Caught in a Free State (1983)
- Charlie (2015)
- Civvies (1992)
- Confessional (1989)
- Dan & Becs (2007)
- Deception (2013)
- Dublin Murders (2019)
- Eureka Street (1999)
- Falling for a Dancer (1998)
- Fallout (2006)
- Family (1994)
- Father & Son (2009)
- Finding Joy (2018)
- Foreign Exchange (2004)
- The Hanging Gale (1995)
- Harry's Game (1982)
- Insurrection (1966)
- Kat & Alfie: Redwater (2017)
- Kings in Grass Castles (1998)
- Legend (2006)
- Love is the Drug (2004)
- The Magical Legend of the Leprechauns (1999)
- Mia, Liebe meines Lebens (Mia, Love of My Life) (1998)
- Murder in Eden (1991)
- Painted Lady (1997)
- Parnell and the Englishwoman (1991)
- Paths to Freedom (2000)
- Paula (2017)
- Proof (2004)
- Prosperity (2007)
- Pure Mule (2005)
- Quirke (2014)
- Random Passage (2002)
- Rebel Heart (2001)
- Rebellion (2016)
- Resistance (2019)
- Scarlett (1994) - sequel to Gone with the Wind
- Shoot to Kill (1990)
- Stardust (2006)
- The Secret (2016)
- Strumpet City (1980)
- Taken Down (2018)
- The Virtues (2019)
- Whistleblower (2008)
- Wild Decembers (2010)
- The Year of the French (1982)

== List of films shot in Ireland ==
This list covers films shot, or partly shot, in Ireland, but which are not set there.

- Henry V (1944)
- Moby Dick (1956) - filmed in Youghal, County Cork
- The Siege of Sidney Street (1960)
- The Spy Who Came In From The Cold (1965) - Berlin Wall and Checkpoint Charlie scenes were filmed at Smithfield, Dublin
- The Blue Max (1966) - set in WWI France
- The Italian Job (1969) - jail scenes filmed in Kilmainham Jail; funeral scene at Cruagh Cemetery, near Rockbrook in the foothills of the Wicklow Mountains
- Sinful Davey (1969)
- Sitting target (1972) - Kilmainham Jail
- The Mackintosh Man (1973) - includes scenes shot at Roundstone, County Galway
- Zardoz (1974)
- The Last Remake of Beau Geste (1977)
- The First Great Train Robbery (1978)
- McVicar (1980) - Mountjoy Prison
- Excalibur (1981) - entire movie shot in Ireland, including a scene at Powerscourt Waterfall
- Educating Rita (1983) - set in Liverpool; university scenes shot in Dublin's Trinity College
- The Princess Bride (1987) - the Cliffs of Insanity scenes filmed at the Cliffs of Moher, County Clare
- Braveheart (1995) - set in Scotland but almost entirely filmed in Ireland; Trim Castle used as Carlisle
- Moll Flanders (1996)
- Saving Private Ryan (1998) - beach scenes filmed on Curracloe beach, County Wexford
- David Copperfield (2000)
- Reign of Fire (2002) - entire movie, includes scenes shot at Wicklow Gap and Poolbeg Generating Station
- Ella Enchanted (2004)
- King Arthur (2004)
- Freeze Frame (2004)
- Sachein (2005) - Tamil film; a song was shot in Ireland
- The League Of Gentlemen's Apocalypse (2005) - almost entirely filmed in Northern Ireland
- Harry Potter and the Half-Blood Prince (2009) - filmed at the Cliffs of Moher
- Ek Tha Tiger (2012) - Bollywood movie; a song was shot in Dublin's Trinity College
- Star Wars: The Force Awakens (2015) - Skellig Michael County Kerry
- A Dark Song (2016) - Horror Film set mostly in Wales but shot in Ireland
- Star Wars: The Last Jedi (2017)
- Star Wars: The Rise of Skywalker (2019) - Cliffs of Moher Death star wreckage scenes

== See also ==
- Cinema of Ireland
- Category:Films shot in Ireland
- Cinema of Northern Ireland
- List of films set in Northern Ireland
- List of movies based on location
- List of Irish films
