= Cinema of Northern Ireland =

The Cinema of Northern Ireland is small. Traditionally the majority of films made in or about Northern Ireland had focused almost entirely on the Troubles; however, with the advent of peace since 1998, a certain evolution can be witnessed.

== List of films from Northern Ireland ==
This list covers films shot and set in Northern Ireland either in part or in whole

- '71 (2013)
- An Everlasting Piece (2000)
- The Best Years (2013)
- Bloody Sunday (TV film; 2002)
- Bobby Sands: 66 Days (2016)
- The Boxer (1997)
- Cal (1984)
- Cherrybomb (2009)
- Closing the Ring (2007)
- The Crying Game (1992)
- Dear Sarah (TV film; 1990)
- Divorcing Jack (1998)
- Fifty Dead Men Walking (2009)
- Five Minutes of Heaven (2009)
- Four Days in July (TV film; 1985)
- Ghost Machine (2009)
- Good Vibrations (2013)
- Grabbers (2012)
- H3 (2001)
- Hidden Agenda (1990)
- How About You (2007)
- Hunger (2008)
- The Informant (TV film; 1997)
- In the Name of the Father (1993)
- Jacqueline (1956)
- Johnny Was (2006)
- Jump (2012)
- Killing Bono (2011)
- Kneecap (2024)
- Maeve (1981)
- Man About Dog (2004)
- Mickybo and Me (2004)
- The Mighty Celt (2005)
- Middletown (2006)
- Miss Conception (2008)
- The Most Fertile Man in Ireland (2000)
- Odd Man Out (1947)
- Resurrection Man (1998)
- Shadow Dancer (2012)
- Shoot to Kill (TV film; 1990)
- Some Mother's Son (1996)
- This is the Sea (1997)
- Titanic Town (1998)
- Whole Lotta Sole (aka Stand Off; 2012)

== Films shot in Northern Ireland ==
This list covers films shot, or partly shot, in Northern Ireland but not set there

- A Prayer for the Dying (1987)
- Christopher and His Kind (TV film; 2011)
- City of Ember (2008)
- Your Highness (2011)

== Films about Northern Ireland ==
This list covers films that deal or make allusion to Northern Irish issues but were neither shot nor set there

- The Craic (1999)
- The Devil's Own (1997)
- Hennessy (1975)
- Patriot Games (1992)

== See also ==
- List of films set in Northern Ireland
- Cinema of Europe
- Cinema of Ireland
- Cinema of Scotland
- Cinema of the United Kingdom
- Cinema of Wales
- List of cinema industries by location
