= List of films set in Northern Ireland =

This is a list of films set in Northern Ireland, or in some cases dealing with issues relating to Northern Ireland. Many of these films were shot elsewhere, especially the Republic of Ireland and the North of England. See also List of films set in Ireland.

- '71 (2014)
- Angel (1982)
- Bad Day for the Cut (2017)
- Battle of the Bone (2008)
- Belfast (2021)
- Black Medicine (2021)
- Bloody Sunday (2002)
- A Bump Along the Way (2019)
- The Boxer (1997)
- Boys from County Hell (2021)
- Cal (1984)
- Cherrybomb (2009)
- Circle of Deceit (TV) (1993)
- Crossmaheart (1997)
- The Crying Game (1992)
- The Devil's Doorway (2018)
- The Devil's Own (1997)
- Divorcing Jack (1998)
- The End of the World Man (1985)
- An Everlasting Piece (2000)
- Fifty Dead Men Walking (2008)
- Five Minutes of Heaven (2009)
- Force of Duty (TV) (1992)
- The Foreigner (2017)
- The Gentle Gunman (1952)
- Good Vibrations (2013)
- Harry's Game (television film) (1982)
- Hennessy (1975)
- Henri (TV) (1994)
- Hidden Agenda (1990)
- Holy Cross (TV 2003)
- Hunger (2008)
- Nowhere Special (2021)
- I See a Dark Stranger (1946)
- In the Name of the Father (1993)
- The Informant (1997)
- Jacqueline (1956)
- Love Lies Bleeding (TV) (1993)
- Mad About Mambo (2000)
- Man About Dog (2004)
- Mickybo and Me (2005)
- The Mighty Celt (2004)
- Mission: Impossible – Fallout (2018)
- The Most Fertile Man in Ireland (1999)
- Nothing Personal (1995)
- Odd Man Out (1947)
- Oh, Mr. Porter! (1937)
- Omagh (2004)
- The Outsider (1979)
- Peacefire (2008)
- Penance (2018)
- Resurrection Man (1998)
- Shadow Dancer (2012)
- Shoot to Kill (TV) (1990)
- Some Mother's Son (1996)
- A Terrible Beauty (1960)
- This Is the Sea (1997)
- Titanic Town (1998)
- Tyrone Fermanagh (2006; short film)
- Wild About Harry (2000)
- With or Without You (1999)

This list covers films that deal with issues relating to Ireland but which are not set there:

- Best (2000)
- Blown Away (1994)
- A Further Gesture (1997)
- Irish Eyes (2004)
- The Jackal (1997)
- The Long Good Friday (1980)
- Patriot Games (1992)
- A Prayer for the Dying (1987)
