= Experimental Film Society =

Experimental film organisation

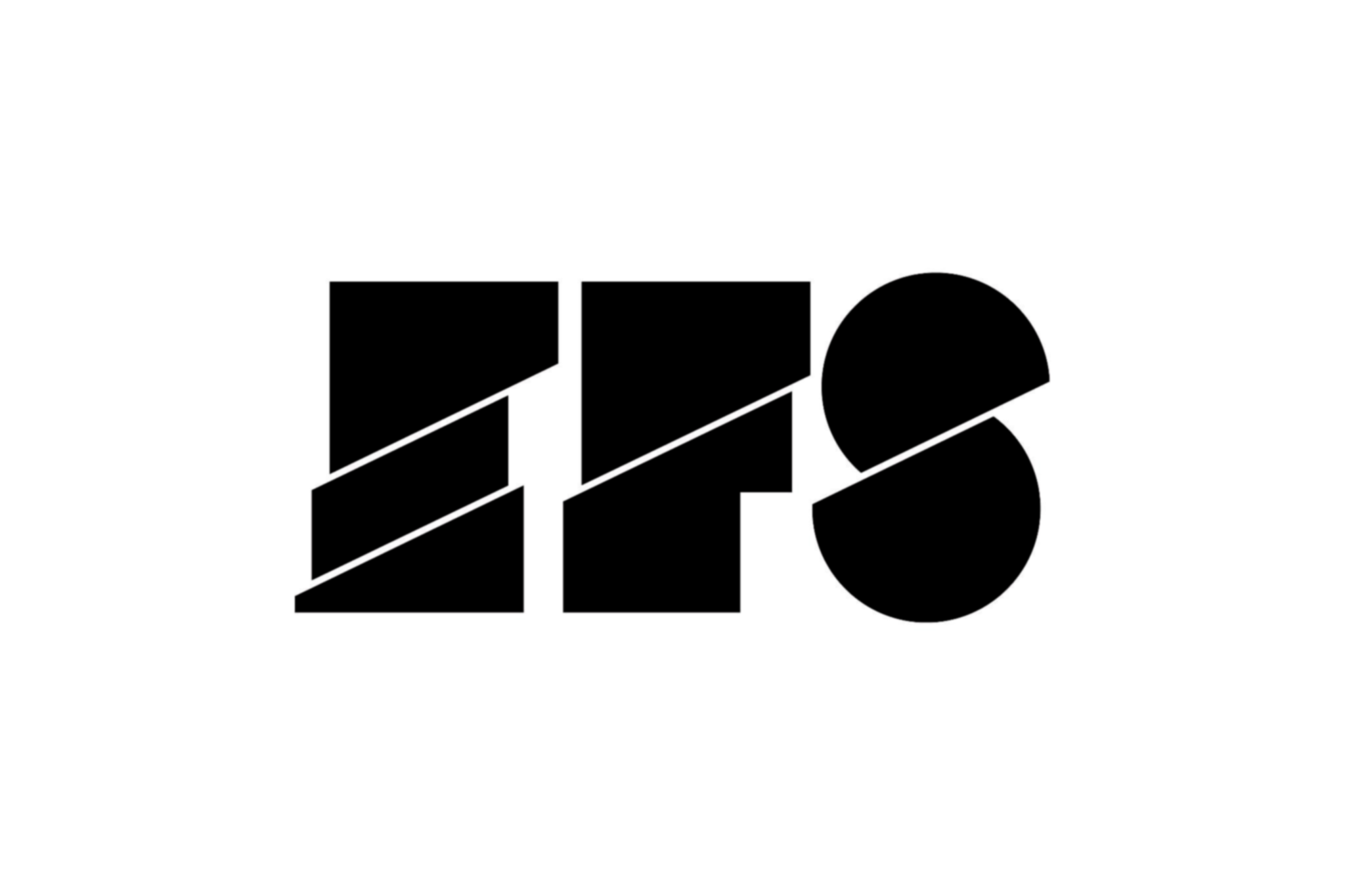
- Company type: Nonprofit organization
- Founded: 2000, Tehran, Iran
- Founder: Rouzbeh Rashidi
- Services: Film production, film distribution, video-on-demand service
- Website: experimentalfilmsociety.com

Experimental Film Society is an Ireland-based film production, distribution and video on demand company specialising in experimental film. It has produced over 50 feature films and 500 shorts, organised more than 150 screenings globally and has a film festival called Luminous Void: Experimental Film Festival.

== History ==
Founded by Rouzbeh Rashidi, the Experimental Film Society originated in 2000 in Tehran, Iran, and expanded to Dublin in 2004. Initially, it was a member-based not-for-profit film collective specialising in avant-garde, experimental and low-budget filmmaking. After accepting new international members, it emphasised film archiving, restoration and programming by underground filmmakers. By 2011, it had initiated screenings, performances and talks worldwide. In 2017, it officially became a production and distribution company facilitating professionally funded projects. It celebrated its 20-year anniversary in 2020. The group was once called "the most active, prolific and intrepid group of experimental filmmakers working in Ireland today".

== Publications ==
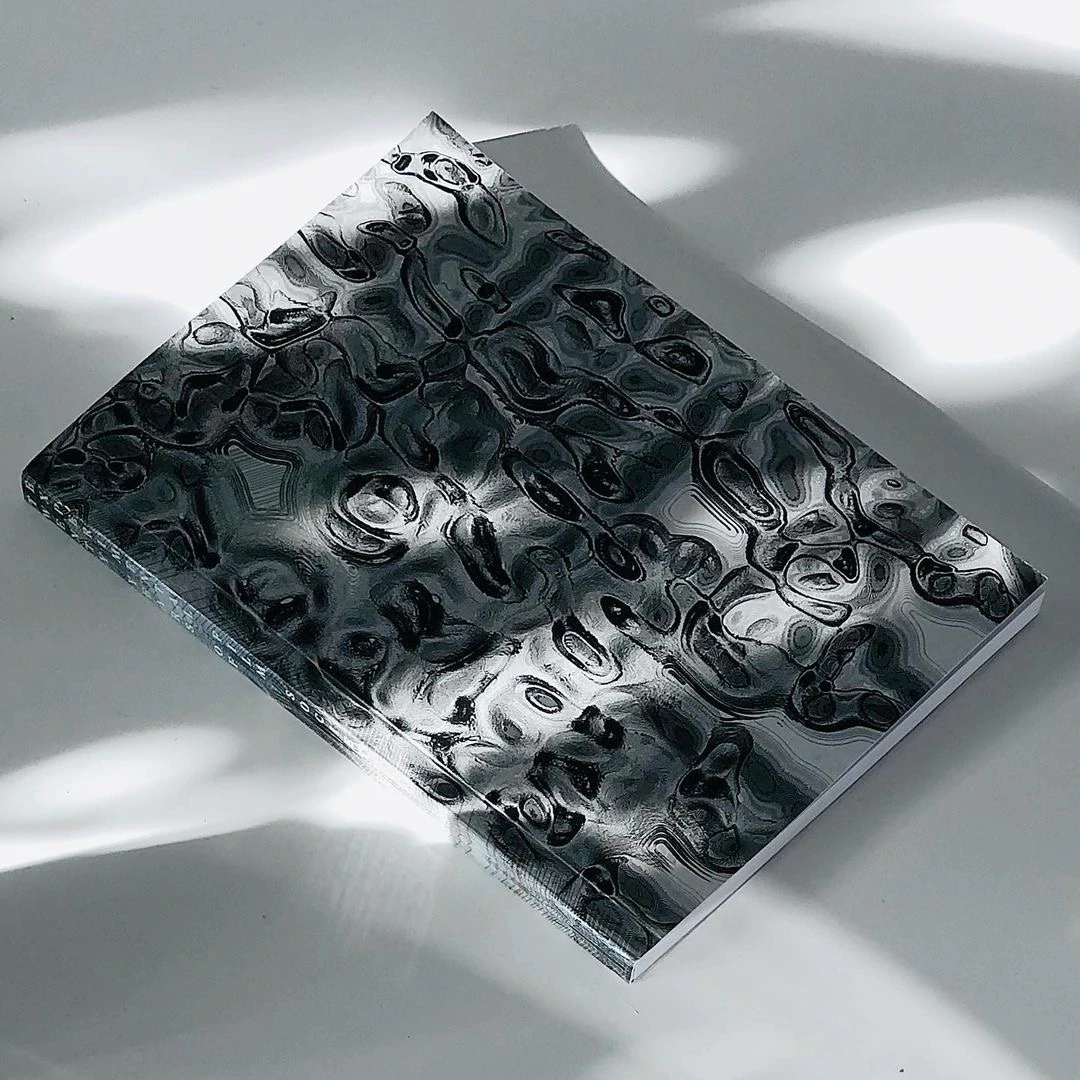
The book cover of Luminous Void: Twenty Years of Experimental Film Society

=== Luminous Void: Experimental Film Society Documents ===
Luminous Void: Experimental Film Society Documents was published in 2017. The book, as suggested in the name, chronicles the history of modern underground cinema by assembling a series of writings, interviews and manifestos that examine the concepts that arise from EFS filmmaking.

=== Luminous Void: Twenty Years of Experimental Film Society ===
In December 2020, Experimental Film Society Publications published Luminous Void: Twenty Years of Experimental Film Society, edited by Rouzbeh Rashidi, Atoosa Pour Hosseini and Maximilian Le Cain. It comments on the activities during 20 years of EFS from an external viewpoint, focusing more on criticism of the group's filmography and essays on film theory.
