= Bernard Kennedy =

Irish psychoanalyst, poet, and priest

The Very Reverend Bernard Kennedy
- Born: Bernard Peter Mel Kennedy; 20 May 1952 (age 74); Rathfarnham, Dublin, Ireland
- Awards: National Council Educational Award

Academic background
- Education: Holy Cross College; University of Sheffield; University College Dublin
- Thesis: The Freudian Understanding of the Symptom (2006)

Bernard Peter Mel Kennedy (born 20 May 1952) is an Irish psychoanalyst, poet, and priest.

== Early life, family and education ==
Bernard Peter Mel Kennedy was born on 20 May 1952 in Rathfarnham, Dublin to William Augustine Kennedy and Alice Kennedy (née Hughes).

Kennedy was ordained in 1979 at Dublin's Holy Cross Seminary (previously known as Clonliffe College). He holds a Master of Arts (MA) in psychoanalytic studies from the University of Sheffield, having matriculated in 2000 and graduated in 2002 with a thesis titled On freudian understanding of Sexuality; he holds a Master of Science (MSc) in psychoanalytic psychotherapy from University College Dublin, which he attended from 2002 to 2004 and for which his thesis was titled On Homosexuality and the relation to the father. His Doctor of Philosophy (PhD) focuses on symptomatology in the works of Freud and Lacan in a 2006 thesis titled The Freudian Understanding of the Symptom.

== Career ==
=== Priesthood and theology ===
Beginning in 1978 at the age of 26, Kennedy was deacon at the Church of the Good Shepherd in Churchtown, Dublin, a position he held until his resignation the following year. He was ordained in 1979 at Dublin's Holy Cross Seminary and in the same year became the youth ministry coordinator at Dublin's Church of Our Lady of Victories and a teacher of religious education at Dublin's Sallynoggin College of Further Education. In 1982, he became the spiritual counsellor of Mater Misericordiae University Hospital. The following year, he left all previous posts and became the chaplain of the Loreto Convent in Balbriggan and the Balbriggan Renewal Group in Dublin, and spiritual advisor to the North Dublin Charismatic Movement until 1988.

In Ireland's Crashing Catholicism (2013), Kennedy offers three causes for the Church's declining power in Ireland:

"It may be that too many centuries of being dazzled by outside control have drowned the Patrician opening text of Ego Patricius, peccator. An obsequiousness towards being ruled from outside is perhaps at root. Obedience to mother, the matriarchal principle transferred to Mother Church and the diminishment of Father, is a third possibility. After all, Catholic iconography edits the male from its iconic artwork in favour of mother and son. Except for God many of our religious symbols in the west are fatherless. We might call this the Joseph syndrome."

Since September 2017, Kennedy has been the pastor of Enniskerry, holding the position of priest of the Archdiocese of Dublin.

=== Psychoanalysis ===
Kennedy subscribes to the psychoanalytic system of Lacanianism, believing in the importance of desire.

In 2005, Kennedy explored transference, identification, and sublimations in his publication St. Teresa, Mysticism and That's Not It. He proposed that "all love is transference" (as regards Mother Teresa's approach) and concluded that "[Jacques] Lacan is availing of what is not, namely, the limit of love and knowledge."

Another 2005 publication, Joyce, The Castration Complex, and the Nom Du Pere, points to the theme of fatherhood as a key factor in the work of novelist James Joyce, "particularly in the important text of Family Complexes in the Formation of the Individual." In much the same way as transgenerational trauma, Kennedy writes that "[the coat of arms] can be seen as a form of indentation of generations upon the psyche of the next generation and for our purposes on James Joyce, writer, poet and son of artificer." This publication focused heavily on the psychoanalytic nature of Joyce's writings, particularly the Freudian castration complex and Lacanian symbolic order.

As regards the Freudian understanding of the symptom, it is Kennedy's strong-held belief, posited in his doctoral thesis, that this theory is derived from the unconscious. He has described it as "a text whose expression is the Symptom but behind which, if unravelled, like a knot of coagulated affect, arising from trauma, and, confected from the social cultural deposits, is an agreement between the Ego and the Id in a context, brought about through Repression."

=== Poetry and writing ===
Between 1998 and 1999, Kennedy published three poetry books with Marmara Press: Leaves of Autumn: A New Poetry Collection 1988-1998 (1998), Berlin, Berlin (1999), The Poet's Tower & Love Poems (1999).

=== Memberships and honours ===
In 1979, the first year of its running, Kennedy won the National Council Educational Award in Philosophy, issued by the Higher Education and Training Awards Council.

Kennedy is a member of several academic associations, including the European Association of Psychoanalysts (EAP), the Irish Psychoanalytic Association (IPA), and the Association for Psychoanalysis and Psychotherapy in Ireland (APPI). In August 2005, Kennedy became a registered practitioner with the Association of Psychotherapy and Psychoanalysis in Ireland; in February 2011, he became a registered practitioner with the Irish Council for Psychotherapy (ICP).

Kennedy is a Member of Poetry Ireland (MPI).

Since 1989, Kennedy has held the position of vice president at the Bracken Boxing Club. He is a member of the Leopardstown Club of Leopardstown Racecourse.

== Political positions ==
In response to the 2018 abduction and murder of Jastine Valdez, a 24-year-old Filipino woman from Enniskerry, Kennedy said "Firstly to say how awfully tragic this situation is and how our heart is with Jastine's family and with her beautiful soul in the kingdom of God." "Our hearts are touched by the Filipino people, there is a wonderful bond between the Irish and the Filipino community, anybody who knows them or works with them know of their gentleness and their nature. They are an addition to our society." He said there was great sadness in the area, explaining "there are about 1,000 Filipinos living between here and Bray, who are a very tight-knit community and will no doubt show their support in the coming days and weeks."

Kennedy has written a number of papers on homosexuality, some on its relationship with organised religion. The Priesthood and Homosexuality: A Basis to Dialogue includes his own research into the cultural understanding of homosexuality, referencing religious doctrine and the "unconscious dialogue". Largely at fault, he believes, is the inconstitency in church teaching that has resulted in "the general feeling among Christian, Muslim, and Jewish homosexuals that they are not welcome."

In 2002, Kennedy wrote Out of Our Depth? A Reflection on Paedophilia for the Irish Catholic periodical The Furrow. "[The priest] has become a lightening conductor for repressed guilt and focus for rage" he wrote. Within the Church, "the whole area of sexuality is fraught with guilt, repression and misunderstanding". Referencing the many cases of child sexual abuse within the Catholic Church, he believes that – in reacting to clerical abuse – the priest "becomes the conduit for opening up the wide and sensitive issue". Kennedy has sought to highlight the issue of child sexual abuse in other settings, saying "it is not good to highlight only clerical abuse".

Kennedy has previously spoken out about the need for Ecumenism within Christian communities. For Volkstrauertag 2022, he led his congregation in "an Ecumenical prayer for peace with interfaith elements," joining Lutheran, Catholic and Jewish communities.

== Personal life ==
In 2009, Kennedy officiated the funeral mass for his "longtime friend" actress Anna Manahan.

== Selected publications ==
=== Books ===
- Kennedy, Bernard (1988). Context Reality : Celtic Phantasm – Celtic Poems. New York: Vantage Press. ISBN 0533076625.
- Kennedy, Bernard (1 August 1998). Leaves of Autumn: A New Poetry Collection 1988-1998. Dublin: Marmara Press. ISBN 0953480208.
- Kennedy, Bernard (1 April 1999). Berlin, Berlin: Nineteen Poems. Dublin: Marmara Press. ISBN 0953480224.
- Kennedy, Bernard (1 July 1999). The Poet's Tower & Love Poems: A New Poetry Collection. Dublin: Marmara Press. ISBN 0953480216.

=== Journal articles ===
- Kennedy, Bernard (September 2001). "Maintenance or Mission? A Tale of Three Circles". The Furrow. 52 (11): 612–616. JSTOR 27664399.
- Kennedy, Bernard (September 2002). "Out of Our Depth? A Reflection on Paedophilia". The Furrow. 53 (9): 479–483. JSTOR 27664594.
- Kennedy, Bernard (Spring 2005). "St. Teresa, Mysticism and That's Not It – The Agalma of Homosexual and Hetrosexual Desire". The Letter. 33: 98–104.
- Kennedy, Bernard (Autumn 2005). "Joyce, The Castration Complex, and the Nom Du Pere". The Letter. 35: 50–58.
- Kennedy, Bernard (Spring 2006). "The Priesthood and Homosexuality: A Basis to Dialogue". The Furrow. 95 (377): 77–87. JSTOR 30095796.
- Kennedy, Bernard (April 2013). "Ireland's Crashing Catholicism". The Furrow. 64 (4): 236–241. JSTOR 24635608.
- Kennedy, Bernard (November 2016). "When It's Time - The Trouble with Waiting". Intercom. 29: 15.
