= Whatever You Say, Say Nothing (disambiguation) =

Whatever You Say, Say Nothing is a 1993 album by Deacon Blue.

Whatever You Say, Say Nothing may also refer to:

- "Whatever You Say, Say Nothing", the title of a poem by Irish Nobel laureate Seamus Heaney from his collection North (1975)
- Whatever You Say, Say Nothing (film), a 1995 film set in Ireland
