= Reminiscences of Yearning =

- Directed by: Rouzbeh Rashidi
- Written by: Rouzbeh Rashidi
- Produced by: Rouzbeh Rashidi
- Starring: Pooria Nick Dell; Toofan Nasehi; Rouzbeh Rashidi
- Release date: April 2011
- Running time: 90 minutes
- Country: Iran
- Language: English

Reminiscences of Yearning is an Iranian experimental film directed by Rouzbeh Rashidi.

== Production ==
Rashidi made this film with no budget in diary-film style over a period of six years between 1998 and 2004. The film was shot with VHS and digital camera. Rashidi re-shot most of the footage from a TV screen in order to create and emphasize on video texture. The film was completed in 2011.
