= Story of Ireland =

Story of Ireland may refer to the following:

- The Story of Ireland - A 2011 documentary released by the British Broadcasting Corporation hosted by Fergal Keanne.
- Hibernia: The Story of Ireland - A new age album by the band Dagda.

== See also ==
- Irish short story
