= Girls & Boys =

Girls & Boys or Girls and Boys may refer to:

- Girls & Boys (play), 2018 play by British playwright Dennis Kelly
- Girls & Boys (film), 2025 Irish film by Donncha Gilmore
- Girls and Boys (album), an album by Ingrid Michaelson from 2006
- "Girls & Boys" (Prince song), a Prince song from 1986
- "Girls & Boys" (Blur song), a Blur song from 1994
- "Girls & Boys" (Good Charlotte song), a Good Charlotte song from 2003
- "Girls & Boys" (The Subways song), a Subways song from 2008
- "Girls & Boys", a Viagra Boys song from 2021
- "Girls and Boys", a Series G episode of the television series QI (2010)

== See also ==
- Boys and Girls (disambiguation)
