= Boys and Girls =

Boys and Girls or Boys & Girls may refer to:

- Children

== Film ==
- Boys and Girls (1983 film), a Canadian short film directed by Don McBrearty
- Boys and Girls (2000 film), an American romantic comedy
- Boys and Girls (2006 film), an Indian Tamil-language romantic drama

== Music ==
=== Albums ===
- Boys & Girls (album), by Alabama Shakes, 2012
- Boys and Girls (album), by Bryan Ferry, 1985
- Boys & Girls (67 Special EP), 2005
- Boys + Girls, an EP by the Promise Ring, 1998
- Boys & Girl, a 2019 album by Deluxe

=== Songs ===
- "Boys & Girls" (Asian Kung-Fu Generation song), 2018
- "Boys & Girls" (Ayumi Hamasaki song), 1999
- "Boys & Girls" (Martin Solveig song), 2009
- "Boys & Girls" (will.i.am song), 2016
- "Boys & Girls", by Conan Gray from Found Heaven, 2024
- "Boys and Girls" (The Human League song), 1981
- "Boys and Girls" (Pixie Lott song), 2009
- "Boys and Girls", by Angelica Agurbash, representing Belarus in the Eurovision Song Contest 2005
- "Boys and Girls", by Cher from Prisoner, 1979
- "Boys and Girls", by Coldrain from Nonnegative, 2022
- "Boys and Girls", by Girls' Generation from Oh!, 2010
- "Boys and Girls", by Mandy Smith from Mandy, 1988

== Television ==
- Boys and Girls (game show), a 2003 British game show
- Boy & Girl, a Chinese television series
- "Boys and Girls" (The Office), a 2006 episode
- "Boys & Girls" (Ned's Declassified School Survival Guide), a 2007 episode

== Other uses ==
- "Boys and Girls" (short story), a 1964 story by Alice Munro

== See also ==
- A Boy and a Girl (disambiguation)
- Boys & Girls Club (disambiguation)
- Girls & Boys (disambiguation)
