= Zoetrope (disambiguation) =

A zoetrope is a device used for animation. It makes motion pictures using rotating images viewed through occasional slits to give it a moving feel.

Zoetrope may also refer to:

- Zoetrope: All-Story, a quarterly fiction magazine founded by Francis Ford Coppola
- American Zoetrope, a studio founded by the filmmakers Francis Ford Coppola and George Lucas and Coppola's movie-production company
- Zoetrope Interactive, a Turkish video game developer
- Zoetrope (film), a 2011 Irish film

In music:

- Zoetrope (band), an American thrash metal band
- Zoetrope (album), an album by Lustmord; the soundtrack to a short psychological horror film of the same name
- "Zoetrope", a song by Boards of Canada from In a Beautiful Place Out in the Country

== See also ==
- Zeotrope, a type of liquid mixture
