= Fergal Keane =

Irish journalist (born 1961)

Fergal Keane OBE HonFBA
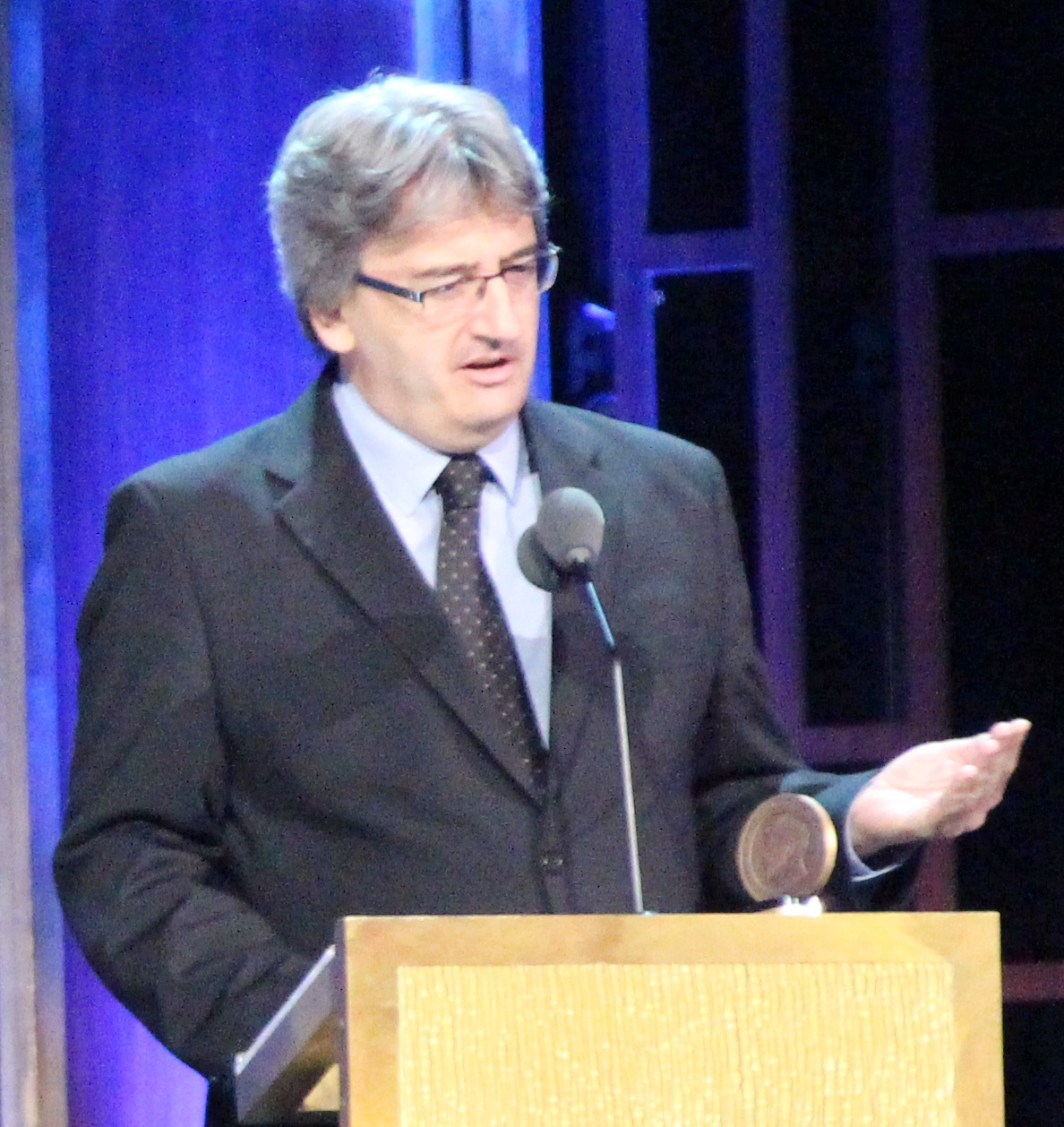
- Keane in May 2016
- Born: Fergal Patrick Keane; 6 January 1961 (age 65); London, England
- Education: Presentation Brothers College, Cork; St Mary's College, Dublin; Terenure College
- Occupations: Journalist and author
- Title: On Air Editor at BBC News (?–2020)
- Relatives: John B. Keane (uncle)

Fergal Patrick Keane OBE HonFBA (born 6 January 1961) is an Irish journalist and author who was a foreign correspondent with BBC News for 37 years. For some time, Keane was the BBC's correspondent in South Africa. He is a nephew of the Irish playwright, novelist and essayist John B. Keane.

== Early life ==
Born in London, England, Keane grew up in Dublin and later in Cork. His father was the Listowel-born actor, Eamonn Keane. His mother is Maura Hassett, a teacher and actress. He attended three primary schools in Dublin: Scoil Bhride, a gaelscoil (Irish-language school), St. Mary's College and Terenure College, and, later, one primary school in Cork, St. Joseph's.

In a 1999 interview with The Independent, Keane said that his Gaelscoil education proved useful in later life: "The grounding in the Irish language I had at Scoil Bhride has never left me. In a foreign country when I'm on the phone and don't wish people to understand what I'm saying, I speak Irish and no Serb listening in is going to crack the code."

His secondary education was at Presentation Brothers College in Cork, where Keane says he was encouraged to join the school debating society, and where he won the Provincial Gold Medal for Public Speaking (on the subject of police brutality in Ireland). Today, Keane continues to draw on this experience acting as a public speaker, event chair and after dinner speaker.

== Career ==
=== Early career ===
On finishing school in 1979, Keane started his career as a journalist with the Limerick Leader. Subsequently, he worked for The Irish Press. Later, he moved into broadcast journalism with Raidió Teilifís Éireann (RTÉ), where he worked in the Dublin and Belfast newsrooms from 1984 to 1989.

=== BBC ===
Keane joined the BBC in 1989 as Northern Ireland Correspondent, but in August 1990 he was appointed their Southern African Correspondent, having covered the region during the early 1980s. From 1990 to 1994 Keane's reports covered the township unrest in South Africa, the first multi-racial elections following the end of apartheid, and the genocide in Rwanda. In 1994, he was appointed Asia Correspondent based in Hong Kong and two years later, after the handover, he returned to be based in the BBC's World Affairs Unit in London.

In the three-part documentary Forgotten Britain, serialised on the BBC in May 2000, Keane travelled across the country meeting people living on the edge in affluent societies. Keane was a patron of the UK-based development agency Msaada, which assisted survivors of the Rwandan genocide. In 2009, he stepped down as a patron of charities he supported when the BBC revised its guidelines for all presenters, citing a desire to protect impartiality.

One of his projects is the five-part series The Story of Ireland, a 2011 documentary co-produced by BBC Northern Ireland and Raidió Teilifís Éireann.

In November 2018, Keane provided the commentary for the Westminster Abbey service marking the centenary of the Armistice.

The BBC revealed in January 2020 that Keane had suffered from post-traumatic stress disorder (PTSD) for several years, and consequently moved out of his role as Africa editor in order to aid his recovery. In May 2022, he presented a documentary Fergal Keane: Living with PTSD on BBC Two, in which he discussed the impact of PTSD and considered the most recent medical thinking on the condition and its treatment, explaining that his disorder had led him to consider withdrawing from conflict reporting.

In 2022, Keane and the French Oscar winning director Alice Doyard collaborated to make the Ukraine war crimes documentary I call him by his name which won Feature Story of the Year from the Foreign Press Association. In July 2023, he revisited the people and locations from the series Forgotten Britain for a second time in the BBC One programme Brave Britain with Fergal Keane. This new documentary was a one-off programme by Alice Doyard and featured new footage of Keane in Cornwall, Glasgow and on the Lincoln Green estate in Leeds, with archive footage taken from programmes made in 2000 and 2012.

In February 2026, Keane announced his retirement from the BBC and said that he was writing his first novel. He also intends to continue working with the BBC on a freelance basis.

=== Other work ===
In 2010 he published his first history work, Road of Bones: the Siege of Kohima 1944, an account of the epic battle that halted the Japanese invasion of India in 1944.

In 2022 he published a memoir, The Madness: A Memoir of War, Fear and PTSD, reflecting on his BBC career and the mental health struggles it caused as well as his battles with alcoholism.

=== Recognition ===
Keane was named as overall winner of the Amnesty International Press Awards in 1993 and won an Amnesty television prize in 1994 for his investigation of the Rwandan genocide, Journey into Darkness. He is the only journalist to have won both the Royal Television Society Journalist of the Year award and the Sony Radio Reporter of the Year in the same year – 1994. He won The Voice of The Viewer award and a Listener Award for his 1996 BBC Radio 4 From Our Own Correspondent despatch Letter to Daniel, addressed to his newborn son, and a One World Television Award in 1999. He won a BAFTA award for his documentary on Rwanda, Valentina's Story. He has won the James Cameron Prize for war reporting, the Edward R. Murrow Award for foreign reporting, the Index on Censorship prize for journalistic integrity, and the 1996 Orwell Prize for his book Season of Blood. In May 2009 he won a Sony Gold Award for his Radio 4 series Taking A Stand. He also won a Peabody Award and an Emmy Award for his reporting as part of the BBC team covering the 2015 refugee crisis.

Keane has been awarded honorary degrees in literature from the University of Strathclyde, Bournemouth University and Staffordshire University. On 15 December 2011, he received an honorary Doctor of Letters from the University of Liverpool. Keane was appointed an OBE for services to journalism in the 1997 New Year's Honours list.

In April 2018, he was awarded the Christopher Ewart-Biggs Memorial Prize for Wounds.

In 2024, Keane was elected as an honorary fellow of the British Academy.

== Published works ==
- Keane, Fergal and Shane Kenny (1987). Irish Politics Now: "This Week" Guide to the 25th Dáil. Brandon. ISBN 0-86322-095-9.
- Keane, Fergal (1995). The Bondage of Fear: A Journey Through the Last White Empire. Penguin Books Ltd. ISBN 0-14-023488-8.
- Keane, Fergal (1996). Season of Blood: Rwandan Journey. Penguin Books Ltd. ISBN 0-14-024760-2.
- Keane, Fergal (1996). Letter to Daniel: Despatches from the Heart. Penguin Books Ltd. ISBN 0-14-026289-X.
- Keane, Fergal (1999). Letters Home. Penguin Books Ltd. ISBN 0-14-028979-8.
- Keane, Fergal (1999). Dispatches from the Heart. Penguin Books. ISBN 0-14-027155-4.
- Keane, Fergal (2001). A Stranger's Eye (BBC Radio Collection). BBC Audiobooks. ISBN 0-563-47814-4.
- Keane, Fergal (2006). All of These People: A Memoir. HarperPerennial. ISBN 0-00-717693-7.
- Keane, Fergal (2010). Road of Bones: The Siege of Kohima 1944. HarperPress. ISBN 978-0-00-713240-9.
- Keane, Fergal (2017). Wounds: A Memoir of Love and War. HarperPress. ISBN 978-0-00-818925-9.
- Keane, Fergal (2022). The Madness: A Memoir of War, Fear and PTSD. HarperCollins. ISBN 9780008420420.
