= Desmond Forristal =

Irish priest and writer

Desmond Forristal (1930–2012) was an Irish priest, writer, and along with Fr. Joseph Dunn, the founder of Radharc, for which he worked as a writer and director.

Desmond Timothy Forristal was born in Dublin in 1930, and lived in Glasnevin. He was educated at O'Connell School and Belvedere College. Forristal's essay won the George Dempsey Memorial Prize in 1948, in Belvedere He studied philosophy at University College Dublin and theology at Holy Cross College, Clonliffe, Dublin, where he was ordained a priest in 1955. He was awarded a PhD in 1956. He studied film and television in New York in 1959.

Forristal and Fr Joe Dunn founded the independent film production company Radharc in 1959, in anticipation at the founding of RTE, which was involved in the production of programmes on topics relating to religious, historical and social issues.

Forristal also contributed as a screen and drama critic to The Furrow, published in Maynooth.

He retired as a priest in 2001, and died in September 2012. His archive was donated to National University of Ireland, Maynooth, by his brother Fr. Ciaran Forristal.

== Plays ==
Closely associated with The Gate Theatre, a number of his plays were performed at the Dublin Theatre Festival

- Black Man's Country by Desmond Forristal (1974)
- Captive Audience by Desmond Forristal (1979)
- Kolbe by Desmond Forristal
- The Seventh Sin by Desmond Forristal
- The True Story of the Horrid Popish Plot by Desmond Forristal (1972)
- Enquiry at Knock by Desmond Forristal, produced for Television. (1979)

== Publications ==
- Oliver Plunkett by Desmond Forristal (1975)
- Maximilian of Auschwitz by Desmond Forristal (1982)
- The Bridge at Lo Wu by Desmond Forristal (1987)
- The Man in the Middle by Desmond Forristal (1988)
- The Second Burial of Bishop Shanahan by Desmond Forristal (1990)
- Edel Quinn (1907–1944) by Desmond Forristal (1994)
- The TV Generation by Desmond Forristal (1970)
- Superstar, or Son of God? by Desmond Forristal (1973)
- The Christian Heritage by Desmond Forristal (1976)
