= Only Human (2010 film) =

- Directed by: Rouzbeh Rashidi
- Written by: Rouzbeh Rashidi
- Produced by: Rouzbeh Rashidi
- Starring: Dean Kavanagh; Atoosa Pour Hosseini; Farzad Fahim; Mark Leung; Sandra Raz Tadrissi Gonzalez; Nathalia Novaes Alves; Reza Rashidi; Yihan Zhu
- Release date: May 2010 (Swansea Bay Film Festival)
- Running time: 73 minutes
- Country: Ireland
- Language: English

Only Human is a 2010 Irish experimental film directed by Rouzbeh Rashidi that tells the visual story of five couples. A tale of people unfolds under the night sky. These doomed couples and lost individuals begin journeys and attempt to find resolution in their lives. As the stories progress, they become neatly woven into a minimalistic portrayal of modern life.

== Production ==
Rouzbeh Rashidi made this film on a low budget and a total cast and crew of ten people, including the actors and actresses. There was no script or pre-writing planning for this film and all of the shots were taken only one time without any rehearsal or repetition. Rouzbeh Rashidi shot the thirteen sequences of the film over a year, edited them individually and compiled them together for final version of the film. There is strong usage of Direct Cinema and cinéma vérité techniques in the film and sometimes actors weren't even aware that they were being filmed. Only Human is in black and white.

== Reception ==
Only Human premiered in Swansea Bay Film Festival 2010 and was nominated for Best Film in Avant-garde category. The film also screened at The Flat Lake Festival 2010.
