= Richard English =

Northern Irish historian (born 1963)

- Born: Richard Ludlow English; 1963 (age 62–63); Belfast, Northern Ireland
- Education: Keble College, Oxford (BA); Keele University (PhD)
- Writing career
- Notable works: Armed Struggle: The History of the IRA (2003); Irish Freedom: The History of Nationalism in Ireland (2006)
- Writing career
- Subjects: Irish nationalism; Provisional IRA; Irish republicanism

Richard Ludlow English CBE FBA MRIA FRSE FRHistS (born 1963) is a Northern Irish historian and political scientist from Northern Ireland. He was born in Belfast.

He studied as an undergraduate at Keble College, Oxford, and subsequently at Keele University, where he was awarded a PhD in History. He was first employed by the Politics Department at Queen's University Belfast in 1990 and became a professor in 1999. In 2011, he took up an appointment at the University of St Andrews but five years later returned to Queen's University Belfast as pro-vice chancellor for internationalisation and engagement.

His father, Donald English (1930–1998), was a prominent Methodist preacher.

== Academic research ==
Most of his research has been centred on the Irish Republican movement and particularly the history of the Irish Republican Army. His first book, based on his doctoral thesis, concerned the history of post Irish Civil War Republican politics and was titled Radicals and the Republic, Socialist Republicanism in the Irish Free State (1994). His next work was a biography of 1920s IRA veteran Ernie O'Malley, entitled Ernie O'Malley: IRA Intellectual which was published in 1998.

Since then, he has written Armed Struggle: The History of the IRA (2003). This book, predominantly a history of the modern Provisional IRA, won the politics book of the year award from the Political Studies Association and was shortlisted for the Christopher Ewart-Biggs Memorial Prize. After this, he wrote a broader history of Irish nationalism, Irish Freedom, The History of Nationalism in Ireland (2006), which won the Ewart-Biggs Memorial Prize in 2007.

He has also co-edited two volumes: The State: Historical and Political Dimensions (1999, with Charles Townshend); and Rethinking British Decline (1999, with Michael Kenny).

He is a frequent media commentator on terrorism and Irish politics and history, including work for the BBC, NPR, The Times Literary Supplement, Newsweek, and the Financial Times.

In 2009, he published a study of political violence, titled Terrorism: How to Respond.

In 2016, he contributed to the documentary film Bobby Sands: 66 Days. In 2017, he delivered the Gifford Lectures on Nationalism, Terrorism and Religion at the University of Edinburgh.

== Publications ==
=== Books ===
- English, Richard (1994). Radicals and the Republic, Socialist Republicanism in the Irish Free State.
- English, Richard (1998). Ernie O'Malley: IRA Intellectual.
- English, Richard (2003). Armed Struggle: The History of the IRA.
- English, Richard (2006). Irish Freedom: The History of Nationalism in Ireland.
- English, Richard (2009). Terrorism: How to Respond. Oxford: Oxford University Press.
- English, Richard (2016). Does Terrorism Work? A History. Oxford: Oxford University Press.

=== Edited books ===
- English, Richard; Townshend, Charles, eds. (1999). The State: Historical and Political Dimensions.
- English, Richard; Kenny, Michael, eds. (1999). Rethinking British Decline.

== Honours and awards ==
In 2015 English was elected a Fellow of the Royal Society of Edinburgh.
