= Shane Todd =

Northern Irish comedian and actor

- Born: 9 June 1988 (age 38); Newtownards, County Down, Northern Ireland
- Spouse: Stacey Todd (2018–present)

Comedy career
- Years active: 2008–present
- Medium: Television, radio, and film actor Comedian; Podcaster
- Genres: Observational comedy Anecdotal humour
- Website: Shane Todd on YouTube

Shane Todd (born 9 June 1988) is a Northern Irish comedian, radio presenter, actor and podcaster. In television, he has had regular roles in comedy series such as Soft Border Patrol (2019-20) and Chancers (2024).

== Career ==
Todd began trying comedy by posting videos on YouTube, as part of the Harlem Gun Club. He also released a teaser for a sitcom called Application, where he plays a fictional version of himself.

== Filmography ==
=== Film and television ===
Year	Title	Role	Notes
2008	Battle of the Bone	David	Film
2008	Ape	Unknown	Film
2010	Comedy Lab	Wayne	1 Episode
2010	L.O.L	Various	Sketch Show
2015	Dani's Castle	Tommy	TV; 1 Episode
2019	Comedy Blaps	Mick	1 Episode; "Thick As"
2019–20	Soft Border Patrol	Laurie Lyle	TV; 5 Episodes
2023	The Bully	Luke	Short Film
2024	Chancers	Various	Sketch Show; Co-Writer; 4 episodes

=== Radio ===
Year	Title	Station	Notes
2015	Euro 2016 Coverage	BBC Radio 5 Live	
2016	The Shane Todd Show	BBC Radio Ulster	

=== Live Comedy ===
Year	Title	Venue	Notes
2014	Nolan LIVE	Unknown	Warm up act
2015	Sick, Bro	Mandela Hall	
2015	Edinburgh Fringe Festival	-	
2016	Edinburgh Fringe Festival	-	
2016	Holywood to Hollywood	Ulster Hall	
