= Zoetrope (film) =

2011 Irish experimental film

- Directed by: Rouzbeh Rashidi
- Written by: Rouzbeh Rashidi
- Produced by: Rouzbeh Rashidi
- Starring: Nasser Rashidi; Atoosa Pour Hosseini; Reza Rashidi; Mahasty Eslahy; Rouzbeh Rashidi
- Release date: 2011
- Running time: 73 minutes
- Country: Ireland
- Language: English

Zoetrope is a 2011 Irish experimental film directed by Rouzbeh Rashidi that tells the visual report of a family. Zoetrope deals with the quality of being expressive, explores the locations, and reveals a life in a small house and its surrounding. The film slowly evolves and shows the history of nothingness of its characters.

== Production ==
Rouzbeh Rashidi made this film with no budget with a Web-Camera in only two days. The shots in this film are extremely lengthy and all static.
