= Radharc Films =

- The Radharc Trust
- Pronunciation: Rye-ark
- Founded at: Dublin, Ireland
- Type: Charity, trust
- Registration no.: Irish RCN: 20011901
- Headquarters: Mount Merrion Avenue, Blackrock, Dublin
- Services: Film archiving, research
- Website: http://radharc.ie

Radharc Films, also known as the Radharc Trust, is an Irish charity which oversees the film archive of the Radharc series of documentary programs. The organisation is based in Blackrock in Dublin, Ireland. The archive, overseen by the trust, includes a collection of over 400 topical and religious documentaries spanning over 30 years.

== History ==
Radharc was Ireland's first independent television production company, filming their first television documentary in 1961. Primarily run by Catholic priests, the film company produced a religious programme, titled Radharc, which was broadcast on RTÉ Television for 35 years. The company made programmes until the death of founder Fr Joe Dunn in 1996.

From 1997, the focus of the Radharc Trust changed from producing new programming to a "mandate to preserve and promote both the substance of the programmes and the values they championed". The Radharc Archive was set up and overseen by the Radharc Trust, with the physical resources in the collection held by the Irish Film Institute and the RTÉ Archives. The archive contains over 400 documentary films, recorded over several decades, as well as associated documentation, research materials and correspondence.

A 2013 programme, The Radharc Squad, which included footage provided by the archive, won the "Best Current Affairs/Factual Programme" award at the 10th Irish Film & Television Awards.

The Radharc Trust also hosts the biennial Radharc Awards. Founded in 2002, these awards are given to the producers of documentary films which reflect the "spirit of Radharc" and deal with social justice, morality or faith-related topics.

== See also ==
- List of film archives
