= George Clarke (filmmaker) =

Northern Ireland film director

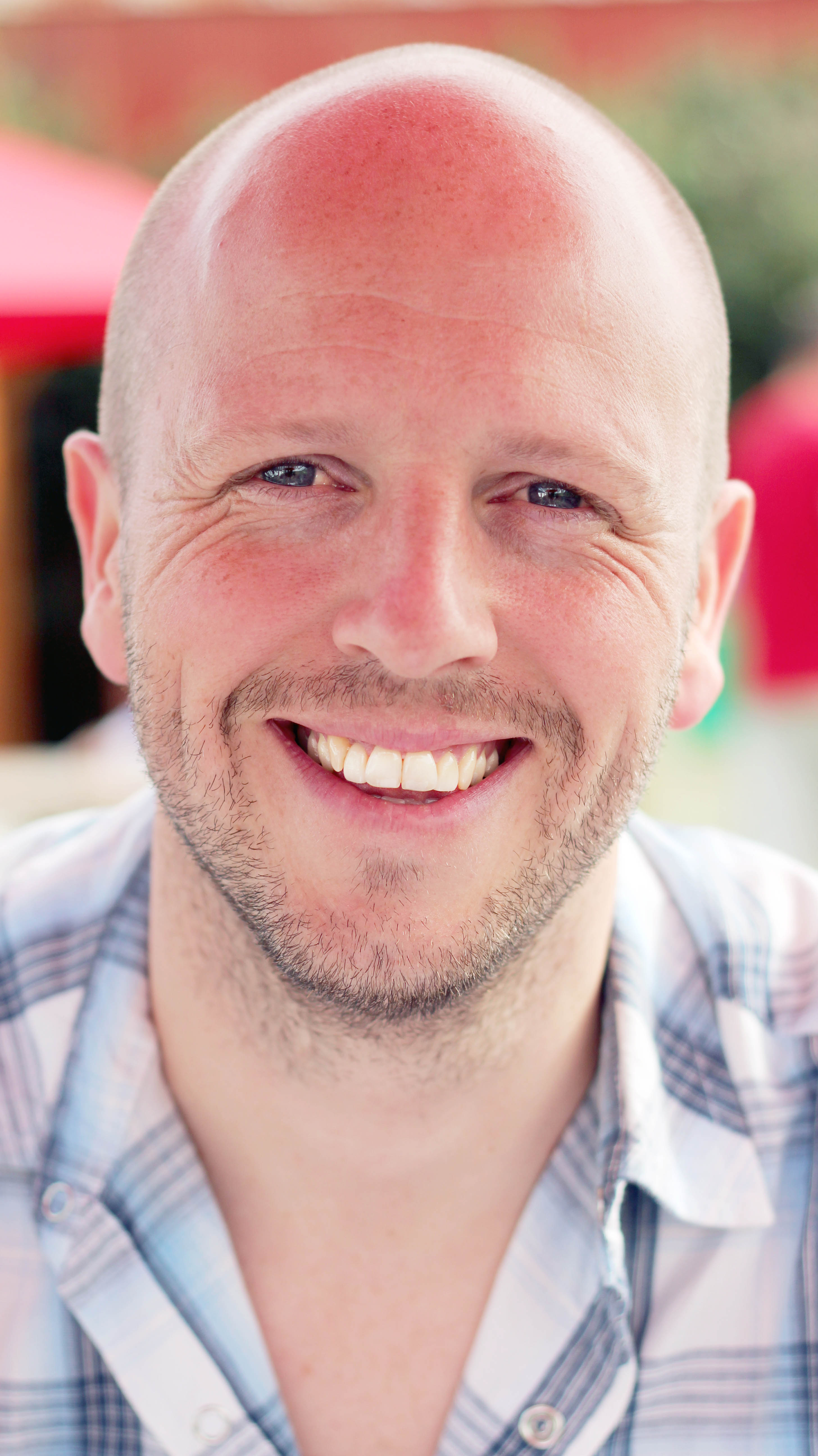
- Born: July 1977 (age 48); Ireland
- Occupation: Film director

George Clarke is a film director from Northern Ireland and the founder of Yellow Fever Productions. He is known for creating low-budget horror films; his 2011 film The Last Light was filmed on a budget of £200.

== Career ==
In October 2007 Clarke launched Yellow Fever Productions. The following year Clarke released his first film, Battle of the Bone, about a zombie attack on Belfast. The movie won the Audience Choice award at the Freak Show Film Festival in Orlando, Florida. Clarke released his second zombie film, The Knackery, in 2009 and in 2011, released The Last Light, which centered upon a maintenance man who must seal up a haunted abandoned old peoples home. The film's lead actor, Robert Render, won the award for Best Actor at the 2011 Freak Show Horror Film Festival. Per Clarke, the film had a budget of £200.

The following year Clarke released the horror-comedy film Splash Area, which was awarded Best SFX and the Jury's Choice Awards at the 2012 Freak Show Horror Film Festival. Clarke followed this up with the release of the 2013 thriller film Onus and the 2015 film The Blood Harvest.

== Filmography ==
Year	Film	Director	Producer	Editor	Cinematographer	Writer	Notes
2008	Battle of the Bone	Yes	Yes	Yes	Yes	Yes	
2009	The Knackery	Yes	Yes	Yes	Yes	Yes	Also known as Zombie Games: The Knackery
2011	The Last Light	Yes	Yes	Yes	Yes	Yes	
2012	Pillow Talk	Yes	Yes	Yes	Yes	No	Short film, co-director with Anthony Boyle
2012	Splash Area	Yes	Yes	Yes	Yes	Yes	
2013	Onus	Yes	Yes	Yes	Yes	Yes	
2015	The Blood Harvest	Yes	Yes	Yes	Yes	Yes	
