= The Furrow =

Irish Catholic theological periodical

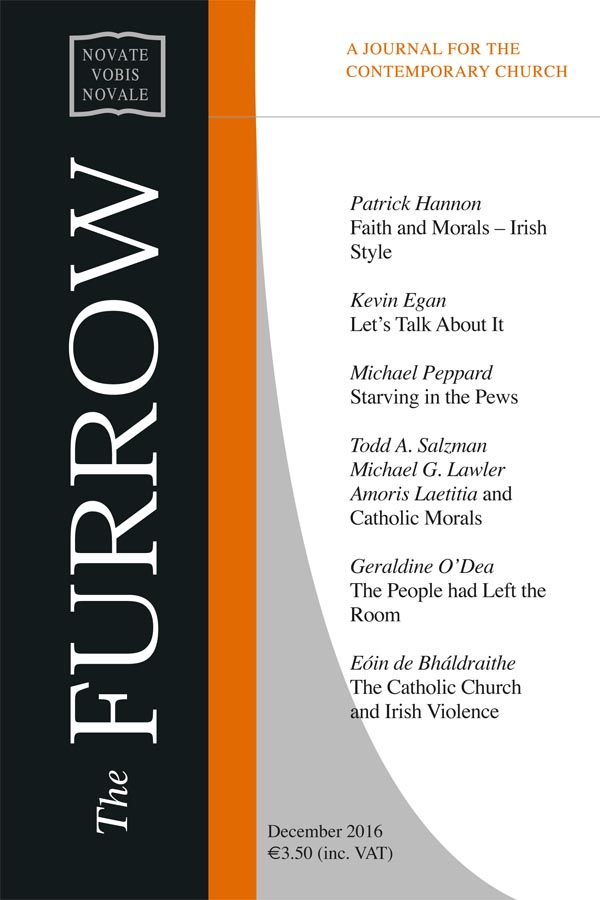
- Front cover of December 2016 issue
- Editor: Pádraig Corkery
- Categories: Religion, theology, pastoral magazine
- Frequency: Monthly
- Publisher: The Furrow Trust; St. Patrick’s College, Maynooth
- Founded: 1950
- First issue: February 1950
- Country: Ireland
- Based in: Maynooth, County Kildare
- Language: English
- Website: https://thefurrow.ie
- ISSN: 0016-3120

The Furrow is an Irish Catholic theological periodical published monthly by Maynooth College.

== History ==
It was founded in 1950 by James G. McGarry, Professor of Sacred Eloquence and Pastoral Theology at St. Patrick's College, Maynooth. Canon McGarry was killed in a car accident in 1977. Canon McGarry was succeeded by the waspish Fr Ronan Drury as editor, a role Drury would hold for forty years, until his death in 2017. The current editor is the Reverend Dr Pádraig Corkery, Department of Moral Theology, Pontifical University, Maynooth.

McGarry set out his editorial and pastoral ambitions for the journal in the first edition: "The Furrow is something new. It is new in the ground it opens. Many branches of pastoral work to which our times have given a special importance demand a fuller treatment — preaching, pastoral organisations, the liturgy, the Church, its art and architecture. And it is in such matters especially that theory needs to be confirmed and corrected by practice. The pooling of experiences in varying conditions of work and the exchange of views on new pastoral methods are means hitherto little used, yet they can give valuable help to all who are charged by God to keep His field. A new opportunity is offered in The Furrow for the sharing of such experience. Moreover, recent years have given evidence of an increasing interest in writing on the part of our younger priests. Life in the priesthood and Christian culture offer to such young writers rich and fertile themes, opening to them a new way of serving the Church, its faith and civilisation. The Furrow will consider it a point of duty to support and encourage such writers."

== Style ==
The journal has a pastoral and theologically liberal style and is widely read outside of Ireland.

== Contributors ==
Contributors have included Cardinals Cahal Daly, Tomás Ó Fiaich, Godfried Danneels, Walter Kasper and Leo Joseph Suenens; theologians such as Karl Rahner, Bernard Kennedy, Gabriel Daly, Rosemary Haughton, Enda McDonagh, Nicholas Lash and Mary Grey; political figures such as President Mary Robinson, President Mary McAleese, Garret FitzGerald and John Reid, and writers such as Seamus Heaney, Fr. Desmond Forristal, Mary Gordon, and Micheal O'Siadhail.

== Archive ==
A fully digitized back catalogue of every edition is available on the JSTOR website.
