= Cromwell in Ireland =

- Created by: Tile Films
- Starring: Owen Roe, Declan Conlon, Catherine Walker
- Country of origin: Ireland
- No. of episodes: 2

Production
- Running time: 2 × 52 minutes

Original release
- Network: RTÉ One / History
- Release: 9 September 2008

This is an article about a documentary. For the actual event, see Cromwellian conquest of Ireland.

Cromwell in Ireland is a two-part RTÉ docudrama broadcast in September 2008. It is produced by Irish television production company Tile Films and is described as an examination of "that great nemesis of Irish history: Oliver Cromwell". The series stars Owen Roe as Oliver Cromwell, Declan Conlon as Hugh Dubh O'Neill and Catherine Walker as Elizabeth Price. The show's airing coincided with the 350th anniversary of Cromwell's death on 3 September 1658 and began on Tuesday 9 September at 22:15 on RTÉ One. It was broadcast on the History Channel in November.

It is directed by two-time IFTA-winning director Maurice Sweeney and presented by the leading historian, Dr Micheál Ó Siochrú. The series consultants included John Morrill, professor of history at University of Cambridge, Jane Ohlmeyer, professor of history and vice provost at Trinity College Dublin, Pádraig Lenihan, lecturer in history at University of Limerick, Nicholas Canny, professor of history at NUI Galway and Ronald Hutton, professor of history at University of Bristol.

Cromwell in Ireland was commissioned by RTÉ Television in association with The History Channel, supported by the Broadcasting Commission of Ireland. It was produced by Tile Films. The series was shot on high definition with large-scale reconstructions combined with CGI, provided by Sue Land and Warren Osbourne of the UK's Red Vision visual effects company, recreating the sieges and battles that took place in that era. Composer and Stellarsound producer, Steve Lynch teamed himself with the Bratislava Symphony Orchestra to record the soundtrack for the series.

== Cast ==
Character	Actor
Oliver Cromwell	Owen Roe
Elizabeth Price	Catherine Walker
Hugh Dubh O’Neill	Declan Conlon
James Butler, Marquis of Ormond	David Heap
Mayor of Clonmel	Patrick Fitzsymons
Owen O'Neill	Boyd Rankin
Henry Ireton	Duncan Lacroix
Sir Arthur Aston	Dermot O’Neill
