= A Boy and a Girl =

A Boy and a Girl may refer to:

- A Boy and a Girl (1966 film)
- A Boy and a Girl (1983 film)
- A Boy and a Girl, a 2023 film starring Yao Chun-yao
