= Hole in the Head (2022 film) =

2022 film by Dean Kavanagh

- Directed by: Dean Kavanagh
- Screenplay by: Dean Kavanagh
- Produced by: Dean Kavanagh, Anja Mahler
- Starring: John Curran; James Devereaux; Lynette Callaghan; John Murphy; John Allen; Alva Brunkard
- Cinematography: Dean Kavanagh
- Edited by: Dean Kavanagh
- Release date: 12 August 2022 (Ireland)
- Running time: 96 minutes
- Country: Ireland
- Language: English

Hole in the Head is a 2022 film written and directed by Dean Kavanagh. It is his first narrative feature film.

== Plot ==
Hole in the Head is an experimental comedy-drama.

The film follows John Kline Jnr, a projectionist and amateur filmmaker who is incapable of verbal communication and suffers from missing time due to apparent childhood trauma. He recruits local actors to play his parents in order to re-create home movies from his past and investigate the 25 year-old cold case of his parents' disappearance.

== Production ==
The film is based on a short story penned by Kavanagh and it was financed by the Arts Council of Ireland, and co-produced by Anja Mahler. Principal photography took place across the island of Ireland during the early COVID-19 pandemic lockdowns of 2020. Kavanagh also served as the film's cinematographer.

== Release ==
The film premiered at the 34th Galway Film Fleadh in Ireland. It screened In Competition at Seville European Film Festival. and its North American premiere took place at Seattle International Film Festival.

It received a theatrical release in Ireland.

== Reception ==
Writing in The Irish Times, film critic Donald Clarke called it "extraordinary" and said that "Hole in the Head shows there's space in Irish cinemas for the avant-garde". The Irish Times gave a four star review stating that the film was "a fascinating puzzle piece that balances abstract oddity with genuine narrative intrigue". Paul Whitington of the Irish Independent gave the film four stars and wrote that one particular sequence was "worthy of Stanley Kubrick". In a review for online journal IAMHIST, Ciara Chambers, film scholar and professor at University College Cork, said the film was "tantalisingly mysterious" and "utterly original", commenting that "it paves the way for other filmmakers to share experimental work unapologetically with 'mainstream' audiences". In December 2022, the Irish Times included Hole in the Head in a list of stand-out films of the year.

Some international press outlets also gave positive reviews. Cineuropa wrote that the film was "mystifying and moving, bleak and funny, the film builds to a finale as strange as it is oddly powerful". Spanish film journal Caimán stated that the film has a "totally fresh perspective, demonstrating the possibility of the co-existence of narrative with experimental". Film journal UltraDogme described it as "a simultaneously profound, absurd, deracinating, and visceral experience". Spanish film journal Cinesinfin described the film as "tremendously innovative".
