= Intercom (magazine) =

Intercom is a monthly pastoral and liturgical Catholic magazine published by Veritas for the Irish Catholic Bishops' Conference. The magazine is based in The Catholic Communications Office, Columba House, St. Patrick's College, Maynooth. In May 2021 Fr.Paul Clayton-Lea resumed his role as editor succeeding Fr. John Cullen who had succeeded Fr. Hayden as editor on his retirement in 2020, Hayden was appointed editor in September 2017 succeeding Fr. Paul Clayton-Lea who had been in the role since November 2015. Mr. Francis Cousins had been editor from 2007. Fr. Gerry Reynolds CSsR from 1969 to 1975 edited the magazine, Fr Kevin Hegarty, served as editor from 1991 to 1994, and Fr. Brendan Cotter served two three year terms as editor from 1998 until 2004.

People who have contributed regularly to Intercom include environmentalist Eanna ni Lamhna, liturgist Fr.Paddy Jones, communications expert Brenda Drumm and diverse contributors in the areas of scripture, social justice, chaplaincy ministry, new religious and spiritual publications and the work of the Commissions of the Irish Episcopal Conference. Intercom provides liturgical and pastoral resources for use by pastors and parish groups and currently (2022) has 2000 subscribers.

"Intercom" is also the name of the journal of the Society for Technical Communication.
