= Conway, the Kerry Dancer =

1912 film by Sidney Olcott

- Directed by: Sidney Olcott
- Produced by: Kalem Company
- Cinematography: George K. Hollister
- Release date: December 9, 1912
- Running time: 125 ft
- Country: United States
- Languages: Silent film (English intertitles)

Conway, the Kerry Dancer is a 1912 American silent documentary produced by Kalem Company. It was directed by Sidney Olcott.

== Production notes ==
The film was shot in county Kerry, Ireland, during summer of 1912.
