= Maximilian Le Cain =

Irish filmmaker

- Born: 1978 (age 47–48)
- Occupations: Filmmaker & Film Critic
- Years active: 1997–present
- Website: maximilianlecain.com

Maximilian Le Cain (born 1978) is an Irish filmmaker, cinephile and film critic living in the city of Cork, Ireland. He is noted for his experimental work including documentaries and video art installations. Le Cain has produced more than sixty short and medium-length films and videos over the past decade. He has written for several magazines such as Senses of Cinema, Film Ireland and Rouge as well as several books, including The Cinema of Roman Polanski: Dark Spaces of the World (Wallflower Press, 2006), and has worked as an editor of the online magazine Experimental Conversations devoted to experimental cinema.

== (An)Other Irish Cinema ==
(An)Other Irish Cinema is a collection of low-and-no budget films produced by independent Ireland-based filmmakers Dónal Foreman, Rouzbeh Rashidi and Le Cain, who created the project to promote an alternative style of Irish filmmaking, predicated on artistic freedom and non-mainstream or experimental cinematic history.

== Operation Rewrite ==
Operation Rewrite is an ongoing multidisciplinary art project by Esperanza Collado and Le Cain initiated in January 2011. Its original form consisted of an online experimental video project to which both artists contributed with extremely short pieces following specific formal and conceptual criteria. The duration of each piece was 45 seconds, consisting of approximately 30 seconds of images and 15 seconds of black screen. '45,33' is a collage created from the 33 pieces of video made so far, some of which incorporate Super8 and 16mm film, and structured according to a numerical system. The project has broadened to include performances, installations, films, video, and an artist's book that explore the workings of the cut and interruption as fundamental associative principles of cinematographic montage, and intending to suggest the fault lines between cinema and the inevitably ruptured articulation of language. Taking as a starting point that the text is a machine that activates a flux of thought between two subjects, Operation Rewrite makes wide use of black screen and of "spaces in negative" as machines of affection, expropriation, and displacement of meaning.

Operation Rewrite takes its name from a chapter of William S. Burroughs' novel Nova Express, where the author describes his subversive "cut-up" method, the aim of which is to explode the disaffecting "parasite organism" commonly known as language.

== Experimental Conversations ==
Experimental Conversations is Cork Film Centre's online journal of experimental film, art cinema and video art. Experimental Conversations' website is operated strictly not-for-profit with all operating costs paid for by Cork Film Centre. Maximilian Le Cain is the editor of the online magazine Experimental Conversations.

== Experimental Film Society ==
Experimental Film Society is a non-profit independent film production company specialising in experimental, independent and low budget filmmaking, of which Le Cain is an honorary member. It was founded in 2000 in Tehran, Iran. Its aim is to produce and promote films by its members. Experimental Film Society unites works by a dozen filmmakers scattered across the globe, whose films are distinguished by an uncompromising, no-budget devotion to personal, experimental cinema. Experimental Film Society is responsible for rescuing and preserving many of its members' films, which otherwise might have been lost forever.

== Filmography ==
All films were directed and written by Maximilian Le Cain

- 2013 Areas of Sympaphy
- 2012 Habits of a Lifetime (Notes Towards a Dream Diary by Humphrey Esterhase)
- 2012 Strange Attractor
- 2012 Money Spent at Night (Super-8 only, sound on tape)
- 2012 Ordinary Video 3
- 2012 Dirt (made with Vicky Langan)
- 2012 Persistencies of Sadness & Still Days (Take 2) (Two part feature film made with Rouzbeh Rashidi)
- 2012 Wölflinge 12/4/'12 (made with Vicky Langan)
- 2012 The End of the Universe as Red (Super-8 only, sound on tape)
- 2012 "Scene 4" of the Experimental Film Society portmanteau feature The Last of Deductive Frames
- 2011 Ordinary Video 2
- 2011 Ordinary Video 1
- 2011 JR: Dream This in Remembrance of Me (video for internet)
- 2011 Lullaby (made with Vicky Langan)
- 2011 The Last Films of Humphrey Esterhase
- 2011 Dark, Plastic, Reversal (Super-8 only, sound on tape)
- 2011 In Advance
- 2011 Desk 13 (made with Vicky Langan)
- 2011 Hereunder (made with Vicky Langan)
- 2011 Background
- 2011 Wölflinge 17/11/'10
- 2011 Operation Rewrite (ongoing internet project in collaboration with Esperanza Collado)
- 2011 Now (video for internet)
- 2011 The Most Beautiful Video on the Internet (video for internet)
- 2010 Approach (video for internet)
- 2010 Somewhere It Is Snowing (video for internet)
- 2010 Presence 1–20 (video series for internet)
- 2010 Hotel La Mirage
- 2010 Involuntary Participation (sound by Karen Power)
- 2010 Ten Minutes Isn't Worth a Dream (made with Humphrey Esterhase)
- 2010 Monochrome Dreams (music video for Makeshift Minehsaft)
- 2010 Slow Tape
- 2010 Coming Soon (as Soltan Karl)
- 2010 Bouquet
- 2010 Smudge
- 2010 Light / Sound (made with Vicky Langan)
- 2010 Sentiment
- 2010 Surface
- 2010 Home Movie
- 2010 Monologue
- 2010 Dirty Sheets of Time (as Soltan Karl)
- 2010 Feed (as Soltan Karl)
- 2010 Hushed Light (as Soltan Karl)
- 2010 No Way (as Soltan Karl)
- 2010 The Last Man on Earth Dreams of Cat Shit (as Soltan Karl)
- 2010 Everybody's Favourite Disease (as Soltan Karl)
- 2010 Night Vision 1–4 (as Soltan Karl)
- 2010 Evening Ascent
- 2010 Next
- 2010 The Soldeck Cycle (as Soltan Karl)
- 2009 ... And The Poor Bird Died
- 2009 The Hamilton Cell
- 2009 Carve
- 2009 Private Report
- 2009 This Video is Still Here
- 2009 on Pause
- 2009 10 Pieces of Video for Internet]
- 2009 Dead or Alive
- 2009 The Everywhere Trilogy
- 2009 Closing
- 2009 The Mongolian Barbecue
- 2009 Letter from Echo
- 2008 Point of Departure
- 1997– 2008 Now Then
- 2008 John Puts a Chair Away
- 2008 Afternoons With Johnny
- 2008 Small Example
- 2008 Valley of the Kings
- 2008 Since
- 2008 Available Light
- 2007 Making a Home
- 2007 (...from a dying hotel)
- 2006 FP: Lessons in Disquietude
- 2006 Rendezvous
- 2006 Game of Truth
- 2006 (Pr)Evens (made with Tim Furey)
- 2005 Forgotten Films
- 2005 This film is not a lifesaving device
- 2005 One Long Breath

== See also ==
- Rouzbeh Rashidi
