= Dead Along the Way =

Dead Along The Way
- Directed by: Maurice O'Carroll
- Written by: Maurice O'Carroll
- Produced by: Sinead O'Riordan; Maurice O'Carroll; Elaine O'Carroll
- Starring: Niall Murphy; Ciaran Bermingham; Tom Lawlor; Ben Condron; Sinead O'Riordan; Donna Patrice; Kevin McCormack
- Cinematography: Mark O' Rourke
- Edited by: Maurice O'Carroll
- Distributed by: Burnt Ice Pictures; ORion Productions
- Release dates: 6 July 2016 (Galway Film Fleadh); 14 December 2016 (Ireland)
- Running time: 87 minutes
- Country: Ireland
- Language: English

Dead Along The Way is a 2016 Irish crime comedy film, directed by Maurice O'Carroll, and produced by Sinead O'Riordan.

== Production ==
The film tells the story of two wedding videographers who find themselves unexpectedly dealing with a dead body, overly-enthusiastic Gardaí, fertility treatment, a vengeful gangster and an imminent wedding. The film was shot in Laois and Dublin. The film is a co-production between ORion Productions and Burnt Ice Pictures.

== Plot ==
Wacker and Tony, a pair of down-on-their-luck videographers, are about to film a wedding, and they think their lives can’t get any worse. Wacker’s wife has chucked him out, he has been beaten up over money she borrowed for fertility treatment, and a drink-fueled incident the night before has put his friendship with Tony under huge strain. But their problems are only beginning. Big Jim – a notorious loan shark who is also having a pretty bad time of it after learning about his 16-year-old daughter’s pregnancy – visits the church and dies after a scuffle with Tony. The videographers decide to try and conceal their crime before any wedding guests arrive.

== Cast ==
- Niall Murphy as Wacker McGrath
- Ciaran Bermingham as Tony
- Tom Lawlor as Big Jim
- Ben Condron as Chopper
- Sinead O' Riordan as Garda McGuirk
- Donna Patrice as Aoife
- Kevin McCormack as Garda O' Neill
- Gail Brady as Sarah
- Tara Downes as Joy
- Johnny Elliott as Ozzie O' Brien

== Release ==
Dead Along The Way premiered at the Galway Film Fleadh on 6 July 2016, and was one of the first independent Irish films that sold out within hours. It then went on to open the Indie Cork Film Festival in October 2016. Following fast in the footsteps of the Galway Film Fleadh, the screening instantly sold out and was moved to a larger screen to accommodate the demand for tickets. The film won best independent feature at the Underground Cinema Film Festival in Dún Laoghaire and then announced a limited theatrical release where it had its theatrical premiere in the Gate Cinema in Cork City. Donald Clarke" of "The Irish Times commented saying the film was "A dead ringer for tarantino, in a good way." In March 2017, "Dead Along The Way" will have its United States Premiere at the Chicago International Film Festival.
