= Bipedality (film) =

- Directed by: Rouzbeh Rashidi
- Written by: Rouzbeh Rashidi
- Produced by: Rouzbeh Rashidi
- Starring: Dean Kavanagh; Julia Gelezova
- Release date: December 5, 2010
- Running time: 68 minutes
- Country: Ireland
- Language: English

Bipedality is a 2010 Irish Experimental film directed by Rouzbeh Rashidi that tells the visual story of a relationship between a man and a woman which discloses during the course of the film.

== Production ==
Rouzbeh Rashidi made this film with a low budget and total cast and crew of three people including the actor and actress. There wasn't any script or pre-writing planning for this film and all the shots were taken only one time without any rehearsal but occasionally Rashidi gave his actors notes to read in order to provoke certain feelings and then filmed the scene straight away. Rouzbeh Rashidi shot the three main segments of the film in only four days but the inserts and pillow shots were taken over a full year in various parts of Ireland. The film is heavily saturated with sound and colour, making use of meditative still photography.

== Reception ==
Bipedality premiered in London Underground Film Festival in December 2010.
