= Radharc =

Irish television documentary series

- Genre: Documentary
- Country of origin: Ireland

Original release
- Network: RTÉ Television
- Release: 1962 – 1996

Radharc is an Irish television documentary series broadcast by RTÉ Television from 1962 until 1996. The documentaries were created by a film unit funded by the Catholic Archbishop of Dublin, John Charles McQuaid, in anticipation of the inauguration of television broadcasting in Ireland by RTÉ in December 1961.

== History and operations ==
Initially founded in the late 1950s by the Roman Catholic Archdiocese of Dublin, the Radharc film unit was staffed exclusively by Catholic priests, including the founders Joe Dunn and Desmond Forristal (1930–2012), as well as Peter Lemass. The Irish language word radharc means vision, view, or panorama.

Radharc produced over 400 programmes, with filming occurring in over 75 countries. It was also the first independently produced series on RTÉ Television.

Fr. Dermod McCarthy, editor of RTÉ Religious Programmes from 1991 to 2008, worked as a producer for Radharc from 1965 to 1982. Others who worked for Radharc include Fr. Liam Swords, Fr. Tom Stack and Liam O'Rinn. Others who featured in producing some of the films include, the actor Cyril Cusack who introduced and narrated a number of radharc films, Cardinal Tomás Ó Fiaich, the broadcaster Andy O'Mahony and journalist Richard Crowley.

Radharc Films ceased production following the death of Joe Dunn in 1996.

== Awards ==
The series won its only Jacob's Television Award in 1963, as Most Enterprising Programme.

- 1966 -"Turkana (Radharc/RTÉ)" First Prize UNDA/WACC Monte Carlo
- 1968 – "The Restless Knives (Radharc/RTÉ)" First Prize – General Interest Category UNDA/WACC Monte Carlo
- 1977 – "Heirs of the Father" (Radharc/RTÉ) First Prize Drama/Liturgy/Entertainment UNDA/WACC

== Influence and archive ==
Radharc has been the subject of academic research, including about the changing representation of priests on Irish television. The Radharc Squad produced and directed by Ruán Magan for Tyrone Productions in 2013, was a two part documentary on Radharc. It was shown on RTÉ and won the Irish Film & Television Academy "Best Current Affairs" prize in 2013.

The Radharc Trust is a charity which was formed to maintain and oversee the archive of Radharc materials.

== Documentaries ==
=== Irish documentaries ===
- Brigid's Night – Lá 'Le Bríde (1961)
- Croagh Patrick, Mass Rock & Men's Sodality (1962)
- Paddy The Cope – Templecrone Co-op (1962)
- Young Offender (1963)
- Open Port (1968)
- The Road to Nowhere (1971)
- Dying for a Drink (1983)
- When Ireland Starved (1): Causes of Poverty (1992)
- When Ireland Starved (2): THE Irish Holocaust (1992)
- When Ireland Starved (3): Managing The Famine (1992)
- When Ireland Starved (4): Exodus (1992)

=== International documentaries ===
- Night flight to Uli – Famine in Biafra (1960)
- The Black Irish – the Irish of Montserrat in the Caribbean (1976)
- The Gaucho Irish – The Irish of Argentina (1979)
- Life and Death in Bali (1980)
- Who is for Liberation (1980)
- High Noon in Chol Chol, Director Fr. Dermot McCarthy, editor Liam O'Rinn (1982)
- Guatemala – Where the Pope is a Communist (1984)
- Cuba – Land of Hope and Glory (1986)
- The French Connection (1993)
- Irish and the Making of Canada (1993)
- NYPD Green (1995)
- Travellers of Murphy Village – Irish Travellers in the US (1995)
