= He (film) =

- Directed by: Rouzbeh Rashidi
- Written by: Rouzbeh Rashidi
- Produced by: Rouzbeh Rashidi
- Starring: James Devereaux, Cillian Roche, Maximilian Le Cain, George Hanover and John McCarthy
- Release dates: September 22, 2012 (The First and the Last Experimental International Film Festival)
- Running time: 122 minutes
- Country: Ireland
- Language: English

He is a 2012 Irish experimental film directed by Rouzbeh Rashidi, starring James Devereaux as the main character. The film is about a troubling and mysterious portrait of a suicidal man. Rashidi juxtaposes the lead character's apparently revealing monologues with scenes and images that layer the film with ambiguity. The film was funded by Arts Council of Ireland.
