= The Story of Ireland =

- Written by: Neil Hegarty; Fergal Keane
- Starring: Fergal Keane
- Countries of origin: Republic of Ireland, Northern Ireland
- Original language: English
- No. of episodes: 5

Production
- Producer: Mike Connolly
- Running time: 294 minutes

Original release
- Network: BBC One Northern Ireland; RTÉ
- Release: 20 February 2011

The Story of Ireland is a five-part documentary series examining the history of Ireland and its impact on the wider world. Over the course of the programmes, Fergal Keane travels across three continents, tracing the events, the people and the influences that shaped modern Ireland. The first episode aired on 20 February 2011.

== Episodes ==
=== Episode One: The Age of Invasions ===
The series aims to explore Irish history using the historical facts and evidence while charting the origin and impact of the numerous myths that have been passed off as history in the past. Key to this approach is relating developments in Ireland to events and changes in Europe and the world at large as the centuries progress.

Areas discussed in the opening episode include the impact of early Christianity and monasticism in Ireland; the birth of Ireland's literary culture; the unique law tracts created by Irish lawyers that afford us insights into the day-to-day lives and habits of ordinary people nearly 1500 years ago.

=== Episode Two: The Age of Conquest ===
As the English set foot in Ireland, there began 800 years of British rule. This episode examines the Anglo-Norman invasion of Ireland and the huge upheavals and changes taking place across Europe at the time.

=== Episode Three: The Age of Revolution ===
Spanning the Ulster Plantation to the Act of Union, this is an era that sees Ireland take centre stage in a much wider European conflict. This episode will also investigate Gaelic life and culture during the eighteenth century through poetry, music and the rise of a Roman Catholic middle class.

=== Episode Four: The Age of Union ===
A new area for exploration is Ireland's role in the British Empire - both in terms of military service - Irish regiments holding the Punjab for example, and in terms of intriguing Irish governors and political men posted in various corners of the British Empire.

=== Episode Five: The Age of Nations ===
The Boer War is of much forgotten significance to the Irish story in the early 20th century. A strong theme in the programme is the exploration of Irish nationalism, the welding together of culture, physical force and blood sacrifice, from Patrick Pearse, Connolly and Larkin right through to the beginning of the period known as 'The Troubles' in Northern Ireland.

And also, the opening up of the 60s under Seán Lemass brought in a new era of economic openness in the south and its eventual membership of the EEC. There is a look at some key moments in The Troubles.
