= Girls & Boys (film) =

- Directed by: Donncha Gilmore
- Written by: Donncha Gilmore
- Produced by: Gearóid Gilmore
- Starring: Liath Hannon; Adam Lunnon-Collery; Francis O’Mahony; Oisin Flynn
- Cinematography: Fionnuala McCormack
- Edited by: Donncha Gilmore; Colin Campbell; PJ Moloney
- Music by: Josh Reichental
- Production company: Gander Video
- Distributed by: Break Out Pictures; Sentioar
- Release dates: 12 July 2025 (Galway Film Fleadh); 19 September 2025 (Ireland)
- Running time: 85 minutes
- Country: Ireland
- Language: English

Girls & Boys is a 2025 Irish romantic drama film directed, written, and edited by Donncha Gilmore, in his feature directorial debut. The films plot follows a rugby player Jace who meets filmmaker Charlie at a college party on Halloween night in Dublin.

The film premiered at the Galway Film Fleadh on 12 July 2025.

== Cast ==
- Liath Hannon as Charlie, an aspiring filmmaker
- Adam Lunnon-Collery as Jace, a rugby player
- Francis O'Mahony as Alice
- Oisin Flynn as Mark

== Release ==
Girls & Boys premiered at the Galway Film Fleadh on 12 July 2025. The film was released in Ireland on 19 September.

== Reception ==
Allan Hunter of Screen Daily stated in the review "Donncha Gilmore makes good on the promise shown in past shorts".
