= Battle of the Bone =

- DVD cover
- Directed by: George Clarke
- Written by: George Clarke
- Produced by: George Clarke; Andrew Mawhinney
- Starring: Shane Todd; Alan Murray Crawford; Laura Jenkins; Lindsey Mitchell
- Cinematography: George Clarke
- Edited by: Jonny Kirk
- Music by: Chris Logan
- Production company: Yellow Fever Productions
- Distributed by: Yellow Fever Productions
- Release date: 17 July 2008 (United Kingdom)
- Running time: 90 minutes
- Country: Northern Ireland
- Language: English
- Budget: £10,000

Battle of the Bone is a 2008 Northern Irish independent zombie film written and directed by George Clarke, and is claimed as Northern Ireland's "first ever" kung-fu zombie movie.

== Plot ==
As rival mobs battle it out on the streets of Belfast, three friends are caught in the middle and have to contend not only with the rioters but a horde of marauding zombies.

== Partial cast ==
- Shane Todd as David
- Alan Murray Crawford as Scott
- Laura Jenkins as Jill
- Lindsey Mitchell as Dr. Death
- Roddy Conlon as SWAT 1
- Phil Barnhill as SWAT 2
- Andrew Brown as SWAT 3
- Tommy Martin as SWAT 4
- Jamie McGrath as SWAT 5
- Logan Bruce as Zombie Logan
- John Gallagher as Zombie John
- Dena Montgum-Brown as Zom

== Production ==
Both the film's title and its plot timeline being set on 12 July, stem from King William III's 12 July 1690 Battle of the Boyne. Created on a budget of £10,000, the filmmaker chose The Troubles as the film's inspiration and stated that he saw the movie as a means to address the issue of division with a twist that shows the two sides of the Belfast community joining to deal with a common threat. Filming took place in Belfast, Northern Ireland at locations such as the Downshire psychiatric hospital. Per the Irish Times, the movie was "one of the biggest low-budget features to have been made in the city" and employed over 500 extras. Clarke and crew utilized various means to keep the film under budget, such as using a wheelchair as a makeshift dolly-rig and a cherry picker for aerial shots.

== Release ==
The film first screened in Belfast, on 17 July 2008, and was followed by a DVD release on 23 October 2008.

== Reception ==
Peter Dendle covered the film in the second volume of The Zombie Movie Encyclopedia, noting that it was "too low budget to come across to most general audiences as much more than friends having fun around some local buildings and streets, but George Clarke's impassioned zombie pic gained immediate attention both for some vivaciously choreographed action sequences and for its political overtones."

The director later noted that the film did not go over well with mainstream critics but that it appealed to the genre fans that viewed it.

=== Awards ===
- Audience Choice Award at the Freak Show Horror Film Festival (2008, won)
