= Atoosa Pour Hosseini =

Iranian-Irish artist

Atoosa Pour Hosseini (Persian: آتوسا پورحسینی; born 1981, Tehran, Iran) is an Iranian-Irish artist-filmmaker based in Dublin, Ireland. Her work draws inspiration from the historical avant-garde cinema and delves into the concepts of illusion, reality, and perception, utilising the mediums of film, installation, and performance.

== Career ==
Atoosa Pour Hosseini holds a Master of Arts in Fine Art Media from the National College of Art and Design in Dublin and a Bachelor of Arts in Fine Art Painting from Azad University of Art and Architecture in Tehran. She co-directs the Experimental Film Society, an Irish organisation focused on experimental cinema. She has received awards and funding from institutions including the Arts Council of Ireland, Culture Ireland, and Dublin City Council.

Pour Hosseini's artwork has been exhibited in numerous galleries, museums, festivals, and showcases. Notable venues where her work has been shown include the Irish Film Institute (IFI), the LAB Gallery in Dublin, the 63rd Cork Film Festival, the 18th LUFF Festival in Switzerland, The Museum of the Moving Image in New York, Jeu De Paume in Paris, the ANALOGICA touring programme, and the Museum of Contemporary Art in Tehran.
