= Bobby Sands: 66 Days =

- Advertising poster
- Directed by: Brendan J. Byrne
- Written by: Brendan J. Byrne
- Produced by: Trevor Birney
- Starring: Martin McCann; Fintan O'Toole; Charles Moore; Richard English; Norman Tebbit; Tim Pat Coogan; Dessie Waterworth; Gerry Adams
- Production companies: Cyprus Avenue Films; Fine Point Films
- Distributed by: Wildcard Distribution (Ireland); Content Media (United Kingdom)
- Release dates: 3 May 2016 (Hot Docs); 5 August 2016
- Running time: 106 minutes
- Countries: United Kingdom; Ireland
- Language: English

Bobby Sands: 66 Days is a 2016 British-Irish documentary film about Bobby Sands and the 1981 Irish hunger strike, which lasted for 66 days, from Northern Ireland.

== Production ==
The film mixes reenactment, animation, interviews and archive footage to relate the story of Bobby Sands and the 1981 Irish hunger strike, as well as covering the events leading up to the hunger strike and its complex legacy. Martin McCann reads several excerpts from Sands' own diary.

== Release ==
Bobby Sands: 66 Days premiered at Hot Docs Canadian International Documentary Festival in Toronto on 3 May 2016. It went on general release in Ireland on 5 August 2016, where it set a record for the highest-grossing opening weekend for an Irish documentary film (€50,933 or £43,300), and the second-highest for any documentary (behind Fahrenheit 9/11).

== Reception ==
The Irish Times awarded the film four stars out of five, calling it " a comprehensive, balanced, gripping tale of terrible times." Empire said " Narratives of the Northern Irish Troubles are a nightmare of bias and bullshit — this superior doc does better than most in cutting through both." As of 16 August 2019, the film had a 90% critics' rating on Rotten Tomatoes and a 71 ("generally favourable") on Metacritic.

Several unionist politicians criticised the fact that the film received funding from the state (via Northern Ireland Screen and the BBC).

Caoimhghín Ó Caoláin TD, who was Director of Elections for hunger striker Kieran Doherty in 1981 and a National Executive member of the Anti H-Block/Armagh Committee, praised the documentary as "powerful" and "emotionally charged for republicans who had participated in the struggle" during those years. However, he was critical of the prominence given to Irish Times columnist Fintan O'Toole, describing his on-screen analysis as "insulting, completely off-the mark" and "deserving of derision."
