= Jacqueline (1956 film) =

1956 British film by Roy Ward Baker

- Directed by: Roy Ward Baker
- Written by: Patrick Kirwan; Liam O'Flaherty additional dialogue Patrick Campbell; Catherine Cookson
- Based on: A Grand Man (novel) by Catherine Cookson
- Starring: John Gregson
- Cinematography: Geoffrey Unsworth
- Edited by: John D. Guthridge
- Music by: Cedric Thorpe Davie
- Production companies: George H. Brown Productions; Rank Organisation Film Productions
- Distributed by: Rank
- Release date: 5 June 1956
- Running time: 89 minutes
- Country: United Kingdom
- Language: English

Jacqueline is a 1956 British drama film directed by Roy Ward Baker and starring John Gregson and Kathleen Ryan. It was written by Patrick Kirwan and Liam O'Flaherty based on the 1954 novel The Grand Man by Catherine Cookson. It was filmed in Belfast.

== Plot ==
Steel worker Mike McNeil's drinking spirals out of control when he loses his job due to vertigo at the Belfast shipyard. But his devoted young daughter Jacqueline vows to help him.

She is picked as soloist at a church festival and attempts to persuade a tough land-owner to give her troubled dad another chance.

== Cast ==
- John Gregson as Mike McNeil
- Kathleen Ryan as Elizabeth McNeil
- Jacqueline Ryan as Jacqueline McNeil
- Noel Purcell as Mr. Owen
- Cyril Cusack as Mr. Flannagan
- Tony Wright as Jack McBride
- Maureen Swanson as Maggie
- Liam Redmond as Mr. Lord
- Maureen Delany as Mrs. McBride
- Richard O'Sullivan as Michael McNeil
- Marie Kean as Mrs. Flannagan
- J. G. Devlin as Mr. Lord's servant
- Harold Goldblatt as Schoolmaster
- Sam Kydd as Foreman

== Production ==
The film was based on the novel The Grand Man (1954) by Catherine Cookson. It was Cookson's fifth book. Cookson was paid £750 for the rights and a draft of the script. The film was set in Belfast as opposed to Tyneside which is where the novel was set. Cookson disliked the casting of Jacqueline Ryan in the lead role, feeling she was miscast. She was ultimately unhappy with the film, as she was with Rooney another adaptation from the Rank Organisation of one of her novels.

Baker said "the picture was partly made because of the introduction at that time of the blue backing process which made back projection very much easier than the old-fashioned process but it had its teething problems and difficulties. So, I boldly was the first one to use it and it worked extremely well. Again, we had an extremely good cast."

Filmink argued the film was made due to the success of The Little Kidnappers.

Baker said John Gregson "was excellent for the part except he kept saying I wish I was Victor McLaglen because it needed a great big hunk of a man and John wasn't." The movie featured Tony Wright in an early role.

Jacqueline Ryan was the daughter of Phyllis Ryan, an actor and later manager.

There was some location work done in Belfast but the bulk of the film was shot at Pinewood. Ward said "Every film has its problems and with this one it was that the central character was the little girl who since she was nine had never been in front of a camera before. She'd been tested and looked at and seemed all right. But she was frightened to death. I think she thought the Duke of Wellington was going to come and put her in the Tower and leave her there. Anyway, she got through it and in the end she wasn't bad. Also, I'd never directed a child before.

Roy Ward Baker said "the film was quite successful. It was a harmless fairy tale. They were all good in it and they were picturesque and quite funny."

== Critical reception ==
The Monthly Film Bulletin wrote: "A disarmingly simple and good-hearted film. The slight story is filled out with some quite engaging incidentals – battles with the neighbours and with an intrusive mother-in-law, back-street Coronation celebrations. The production work is unpretentious and accomplished. Jacqueline Ryan, an undeniably talented little actress, creates an authentic character in the title role – shrewd, self-willed and touchingly loyal. John Gregson, not ideally cast, and Kathleen Ryan are sympathetic as the parents, and there is good support from several Irish stalwarts."

Kine Weekly wrote: "Its story is really one dramatic cliché after another, but, funnily enough, the final amalgam gets by. ... Fundamentally, the picture has not a single original idea. The regeneration of a drunken father by a child; Irish feuds and comical Irish backchat; the tycoon with a deeply concealed heart of gold; the patient and understanding parson; and the young lovers whose parents are deadly enemies have all been seen before. They are all here and are made pleasantly credible by the sturdy acting of John Gregson and Kathleen Ryan, with a hand-picked cast of supporting players; but it is young Jacqueline who takes the film above the level of a run-of-the-mill British comedy-drama."

The Observer called it "a nice, dull film."

Variety called it "A saccharine, sentimental yarn ... notable for the fact that it introduces an attractive new child personality. Also that it permits most of the other characters to indulge in large doses of conventional Irish blarney. Pic is strictly for the family trade. The story is old-fashioned in conception and presentation, and never attempts to be anything but dated melodrama... The emphasis all the way is on the tear-jerking aspects and they’re frequently very contrived. There is a limited appeal in the background and the scenes of a slum neighborhood celebrating the Coronation with a street party has some interest. The picture, however, is dominated by the moppet performer who, without precociousness, and with no previous experience, acts with genuine conviction and sincerity.

Britmovie called the film "gushingly sentimental".

Sky Movies called it "a likeable little drama with earnest performances and atmospheric background detail."

Filmink wrote "the movie is one of the many examples that Rank didn’t consistently know how to make a commercial film."
