= Rouzbeh Rashidi =

Iranian filmmaker

- روزبه رشیدی
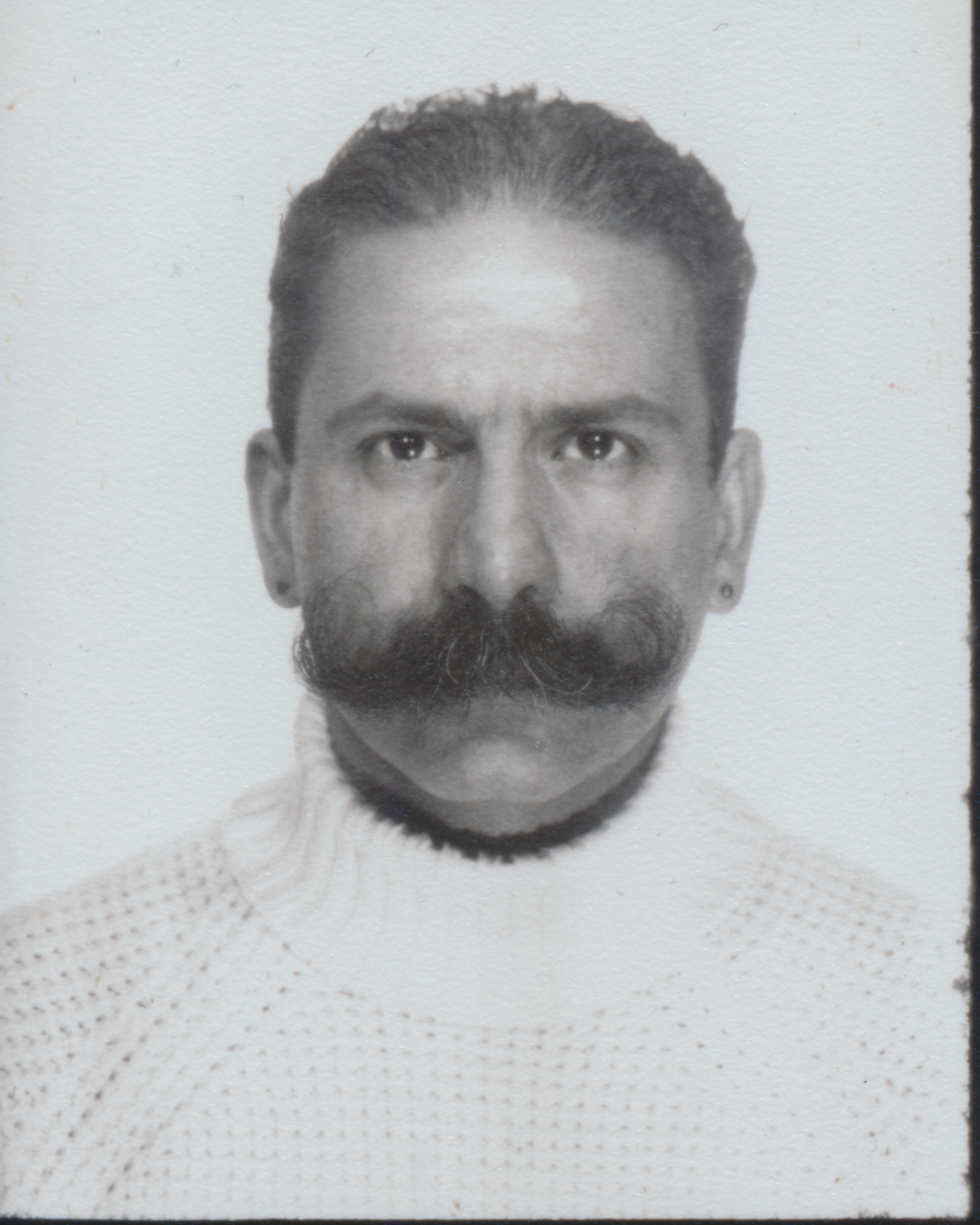
- Born: 23 December 1980 (age 45); Tehran, Iran
- Occupation: Filmmaker
- Years active: 2000–present

Rouzbeh Rashidi (Persian: روزبه رشیدی; born 23 December 1980 in Tehran, Iran) is an Iranian-Irish avant-garde filmmaker and founder of Experimental Film Society. Since 2000, Rashidi produced experimental feature films and numerous volumes of instalments for the Homo Sapiens Project.

== Early life ==
Born in Tehran, from an early age, Rashidi collected records most of which he has sold to buy his first camera, VHSc to start making films in the year 2000. His observation has shown that there were three main filmmaking categories: mainstream, guerilla and video art. Mainstream implied an accent on storytelling, underground held similar ideas to the first category but lacked financial support, and lastly, originating from a visual arts background, video art most often persuaded a political point. Not being fulfilled by the options, the filmmaker came up with an alternative solution by creating his own system of creating and screening films.

== Career ==
=== 2000s ===
In 2004, Rashidi moved to Dublin, where he continued establishing the Experimental Film Society and his filmmaking practice. The filmmaker received 3 Smedias Awards for the Homo Sapiens Project (200) work-in-progress version in 2009, and shortly after released his debut feature film, "Only Human."

=== 2010s ===
In 2010, an experimental drama feature film was released under the name "Bipedality", followed by an experimental mystery feature film "Closure of Catharsis" in 2011.

In 2011, the first official Experimental Film Society screening was led in Dublin, expanding the Irish programming of experimental cinema.

The feature films Hades of Limbo (screened at Govett-Brewster Art Gallery in 2022), Indwell Extinction of Hawks in Remoteness and HE were the products of 2012, landing Rashidi the reputation of a "naturally predisposed to experimentation, always looking for a new film language, rejecting its canons." (CinePensieri Magazine). The title There Is No Escape From The Terrors Of The Mind released in 2013 was chosen to be performed in tandem with the sound artists at Sharjah Art Foundation in 2020.

In 2015, the new era of Rashidi's filmography has begun defining itself as a science-fiction trilogy. The premiere of Ten Years in The Sun, a homage to Luis Buñuel and Joao Cesar Monteiro, took place at Dublin International Film Festival in 2015. A year later, an avant-garde fantasy Trailers debuted at Cork International Film Festival. The concluding piece Luminous Void: Docudrama (2019) was premiered at Istanbul International Experimental Film Festival.

In 2017, Rashidi received the Reel Art Award from the Arts Council of Ireland for his experimental documentary landscape feature film Phantom Islands (2018) to be later distributed by the Irish Film Institute. The film has received the best feature-length prize at the Istanbul International Experimental Film Festival.

=== 2020s ===
In February 2020, Rashidi was accepted to be a part of Berlinale Talents. The same year, the eight-hour feature film "Homo Sapiens Project 200" (2000-2020) was released as a constitution of twenty years of film experiments.

In 2021, the filmmaker's most extended feature, "Homo Sapiens Project 201", was released, reaching a total of nineteen hours.

In the year 2022, Rashidi taught Experimental Filmmaking and Practise at Universität der Künste in Berlin, Germany.

== Experimental Film Society ==
In 2000, Rashidi founded the Experimental Film Society in Tehran, Iran which four years later expanded to Dublin. First, EFS was a member-based not-for-profit film collective specialising in avant-garde, experimental and low-budget filmmaking. While employing new international members, the group emphasised film archiving, restoring and programming by underground filmmakers. By 2011, the collective put the initiative into organising screenings, performances and talks worldwide. In 2017, EFS officially became a production and distribution company facilitating professionally funded projects. The year 2020 marked the two decades of the existence Experimental Film Society and the culmination of the company's multidisciplinary work. The group is often referred to as "the most active, prolific and intrepid group of experimental filmmakers working in Ireland today" (aemi).

== Reception ==
Rashidi's works have been noted by several film critics for being a bridge between traditional and experimental cinema. Film critic Adrian Martin from Australia praised his body of work describing it as "prodigious". Irish filmmaker Dónal Foreman viewed his cinema as an important new direction in the context of contemporary Irish film and critic Bill Mousoulis noted similar things about his films, he stated that Rashidi actually seems to get closer to this fine line between “experimental” and “narrative” than any other filmmaker known to him. he also compared him to a 21st century Robert Bresson.

== Homo Sapiens Project ==
in 2011, Rashidi initiated the Homo Sapiens Project (HSP), an ongoing series of personal experimental video instalments. In its entirety, the project, as he says, is "not a filmed life, but filmmaking as a parallel to life and a parallel life".

In 2020, the eight-hour experimental feature Homo Sapiens Project (200) was completed as part of the 20th anniversary of the Experimental Film Society.

== Filmography ==
Feature films

- 2009 Only Human
- 2010 Bipedality
- 2011 Closure of Catharsis
- 2012 Hades of Limbo
- 2012 Indwell Extinction of Hawks in Remoteness
- 2012 HE
- 2013 HSP: There Is No Escape From The Terrors Of The Mind
- 2015 Ten Years In The Sun
- 2016 TRAILERS
- 2018 Phantom Islands
- 2019 Luminous Void: Docudrama

== See also ==
- Maximilian Le Cain
- Experimental film
- Remodernist film
