= Titanic Town =

- Directed by: Roger Michell
- Written by: Mary Costello; Anne Devlin
- Produced by: George Faber; Charles Pattinson
- Starring: Julie Walters; Ciarán Hinds; Nuala O'Neill; Ciarán McMenamin
- Cinematography: John Daly
- Edited by: Kate Evans
- Music by: Trevor Jones, Gareth Cousins, Kipper
- Production company: Company Pictures
- Distributed by: Alliance Releasing
- Release date: 13 November 1998
- Running time: 100 minutes
- Country: United Kingdom
- Language: English
- Box office: US$65,793 (US/Canada)

Titanic Town is a 1998 film directed by Roger Michell and starring Julie Walters, Ciarán Hinds, Nuala O'Neill, and Ciarán McMenamin. It is set in Belfast during the Troubles.

It was filmed in Shortmead Drive and Green Close in Cheshunt, Hertfordshire.

== Premise ==
Aidan and Bernie McPhelimy are a mother and father caught in the Northern Ireland Troubles in Belfast (known for building the RMS Titanic). Bernie's close friend is killed in the crossfire and so she becomes involved in the peace process.

== Cast ==
=== The McPhelimy family ===
- Ciarán Hinds as Aidan McPhelimy
- Julie Walters as Bernie McPhelimy
- Nuala O'Neill as Annie McPhelimy
- James Loughran as Thomas McPhelimy
- Barry Loughran as Brendan McPhelimy
- Elizabeth Donaghy as Sinead McPhelimy
- Mal Rogers as Uncle Jimmy

=== The Englishmen at Stormont ===
- Oliver Ford Davies as Whittington
- Nicholas Woodeson as Immonger (as Nick Woodeson)

=== Others ===
- Ciarán McMenamin as Dino/Owen
- Janice Pollock as Patsy French
- Caolan Byrne as Niall French
- Aingeal Grehan as Deirdre
- Des McAleer as Finnbar
- B.J. Hogg as Chair
- Doreen Hepburn as Nora
- Mairead Redmond as Mairead
