= Man About Dog =

- Directed by: Paddy Breathnach
- Written by: Pearse Elliott; Abdullahi Ahmed
- Produced by: Simon Channing; Abdullahi Ahmed; Robert Walpole
- Starring: Allen Leech; Tom Murphy; Ciaran Nolan; Sean McGinley; Pat Shortt; Fionnula Flanagan; Martin Rogan
- Music by: Hugh Drumm; Stephen Rennicks
- Distributed by: Redbus Film Distribution
- Release date: 1 October 2004
- Running time: 88 minutes
- Country: Ireland
- Language: English
- Budget: €2 million
- Box office: €2.1 million

Man About Dog is a 2004 Irish comedy film starring Allen Leech, Ciaran Nolan and Tom Murphy. The film was distributed by Redbus Film Distribution and directed by Paddy Breathnach.

== Plot ==
The main characters are Mo Chara, Scud Murphy and Cereberal Paulsy, all from West Belfast. They have an interest in dog racing, which the narrator, Mo Chara, informs us, is very important in Ireland. A corrupt bookmaker makes a proposition to them, to help him win a race through underhanded methods and in exchange, he'll give them a dog. After sabotaging the race as requested, they find out that the dog, 'Boots' as they call him, is useless as a racing dog. When propositioned by someone else to help sabotage the bookmaker's attempts to win a very important race, they receive a dog, Cerberus as a reward.

They decide to test out Cerberus' ability and enter him in a race. However, instead of racing, Cerberus lies down inside the box and does not move, losing the three men some money. Outside the track after the race, the boys argue over what to do with the dog, when they are kidnapped and put in the back of a van. When they wake up, they find themselves hung up in a dog-food processing plant with the bookmaker and his henchman, Mooney in front of them. The bookmaker says that because they sabotaged the race his dog was in, which had a prize of £50,000, that they owed him that amount; he gives them a week to pay it.

The men decide to go 'down south' to the Republic of Ireland in order to escape their pursuers. While in the south, they see a local fair and decide to race the dog so as to win some money. The dog loses and angers Scud, who sells him to some travellers who are there, against Mo Chara's wishes. Later, it turns out that the dog is actually a great racer, which Mo Chara puts down to him only chasing real hares, not plastic ones. And the only place they use real hares is in Clonmel at the annual all-Ireland dog coursing championship. The three leave just after a fight breaks out between Scud, Paulsy and the rest of the fair to search for the travellers and their dog.

They manage to steal the dog and get away from the traveller camp, after a brief chase down Irish country roads, they get away from the travellers and make their way towards Clonmel. On the way, they lose the dog out the back door of the van so they turn around to catch him again, after running over a dog which they're relieved to find isn't Cerberus, they find him again.

The three men eventually get to Dublin and get some money by applying to test drugs at a clinic. The same night they meet and have sex with three Polish girls, except for Scud due to erectile dysfunction.

They eventually get the dog and race him in Clonmel. After the dog wins several of his races, the bookmaker again appears and once again demands what he says they owe him. As the three are discussing what they should do, the travellers appear on the scene again and hold the boys over a cliff, about to kill them. At the last minute Mo Chara offers them a deal where if the dog wins, the boys get to keep the dog, but they'll give the travellers the money they bet on the dog, plus half the prize money and if the dog loses, they'll pay the traveller's what they think he's worth, which they say is 50,000 in an unspecified currency. They can't win the money themselves because the dog is in the men's name.

After some tense moments, the dog eventually wins and the travellers get their money and the men get theirs. Paulsy ends up opening the first hash café in West Belfast, Scud gets a brand new shop van, Mo Chara builds a dogtrack and Cerberus is put out to stud.

== Cast ==
- Allen Leech as Mo Chara
- Tom Murphy as Cerebral Paulsy
- Ciaran Nolan as Scud Murphy
- Seán McGinley as J.P. McCallion
- Pat Shortt as Fergie
- Fionnula Flanagan as Olivia
- Martin Rogan as Mooney
- Cora Venus Lunny as Tania
