= Underground film =

Genre of film outside the mainstream

An underground film is a film that is out of the mainstream either in its style, genre or financing.

== Definition and history ==
The first printed use of the term "underground film" occurs in a 1957 essay by American film critic Manny Farber titled "Underground Films." Farber uses it to refer to the work of directors who "played an anti-art role in Hollywood." He contrasts "such soldier-cowboy-gangster directors as Raoul Walsh, Howard Hawks, William Wellman," and others with the "less talented De Sicas and Zinnemanns [who] continue to fascinate the critics." However, as in "Underground Press", the term developed as a metaphorical reference to a clandestine and subversive culture beneath the legitimate and official media.

In the late 1950s, "underground film" began to be used to describe early independent film makers operating first in San Francisco, California and New York City, New York, and soon in other cities around the world as well, including the London Film-Makers' Co-op in Britain and Ubu Films in Sydney, Australia. The movement was typified by more experimental filmmakers working at the time like Shirley Clarke, Stan Brakhage, Harry Everett Smith, Maya Deren, Andy Warhol, Kenneth Anger, Jonas Mekas, Ken Jacobs, Ron Rice, Jack Smith, George and Mike Kuchar, and Bruce Conner.

By the late 1960s, the movement represented by these filmmakers had matured, and some began to distance themselves from the countercultural, psychedelic connotations of the word, preferring terms like "avant-garde" or "experimental" to describe their work.

Having been embraced most emphatically by Nick Zedd and the other filmmakers associated with the New York–based Cinema of Transgression and No Wave Cinema of the late 1970s to early 1990s, the term would still be used to refer to the more countercultural fringe of independent cinema.

== Latter-day cinema ==
In the early 1990s, the legacy of the Cinema of Transgression carried over into a new generation, who would equate "underground cinema" with transgressive art, ultra-low-budget filmmaking created in defiance of both the commercialized versions of independent film offered by newly wealthy distributors like Miramax and New Line, as well as the institutionalized experimental film canonized at major museums. This spirit defined the early years of underground film festivals (like the New York Underground Film Festival, Chicago Underground Film Festival, Boston Underground Film Festival, Sydney Underground Film Festival, Hamilton Underground Film Festival, Toronto's Images Festival, and others), zines like Film Threat, as well as the works of filmmakers like Craig Baldwin, Jon Moritsugu, Carlos Atanes, Johnny Terris, Sarah Jacobson, and Bruce La Bruce. In London, the Underground resurgence emerged as a movement of Underground cinema clubs which included the radical open access group the Exploding Cinema.

A recent development in underground filmmaking can be observed through the Lower East Side–based film production company ASS Studios. Founded in 2011 by writer Reverend Jen and filmmaker Courtney Fathom Sell, the group avoided most modern methods of production, choosing to shoot all of their work on an outdated Hi8 format and usually with no budget. Utilizing many New York-based performers, their work generally contained camp elements and taboo themes. These films were commonly screened at venues and bars in and around New York City.

== Underground versus cult ==
The term "underground film" is occasionally used as a synonym for cult film (as in the case of films like Eating Raoul). Although the categories differ in meaning, they can overlap. The films of Kenneth Anger, for example, could arguably be described as underground while a studio film like Heathers (New World Pictures) may have a cult following but could not be accurately described as an underground film.

== Criticism ==
Film critic Pauline Kael called most underground cinema "a creature of publicity and mutual congratulations on artistry".

== Notable underground cinema figures ==
List is incomplete.

- Usama Alshaibi
- Kenneth Anger
- Gregg Araki
- Carlos Atanes
- Michel Auder
- Scott Barley
- Carmelo Bene
- Jean-Pierre Bouyxou
- Stan Brakhage
- Jörg Buttgereit
- Pierre Clémenti
- Bruce Conner
- Tony Conrad
- Shirley Clarke
- Tonino De Bernardi
- Storm de Hirsch
- Maya Deren
- Marian Dora
- Robert Downey, Sr.
- Rinse Dream
- Stephen Dwoskin
- Matt Farley
- James Fotopoulos
- Hollis Frampton
- Dmitrii Frolov
- Curtis Harrington
- Herk Harvey
- Ian Hugo
- Straub-Huillet
- Ken Jacobs
- Sarah Jacobson
- Richard Kern
- Peter Kubelka
- George Kuchar
- Gregory Markopoulos
- Jonas Mekas
- Marie Menken
- Annette Michelson
- Jon Moritsugu
- Otto Muehl
- Paul Morrissey
- Gunvor Nelson
- Nikos Nikolaidis
- Damon Packard
- Luther Price
- Joel Potrykus
- Yvonne Rainer
- Jesse Richards
- Peter Rinaldi
- Jacques Rivette
- Carolee Schneeman
- Paul Sharits
- P. Adams Sitney
- Michael Snow
- Ray Dennis Steckler
- Chick Strand
- Chester Novell Turner
- Stan Vanderbeek
- Agustí Villaronga
- Andy Warhol
- John Waters
- Nicholas Watson
- Nick Zedd
- Thierry Zéno

== See also ==
- Microcinema
- No Wave Cinema
- Experimental film
- Remodernist film
- Cinema of Transgression
- Grupo Cine Liberación, an Argentine film movement
- No budget film
- Chicago Underground Film Festival
- New York Underground Film Festival
- Lausanne Underground Film and Music Festival
- Boston Underground Film Festival
- New Haven Underground Film Festival
- Hamilton Underground Film Festival
- Anthology Film Archives
- Blender Foundation
