= Anne Pigalle =

French singer and musician

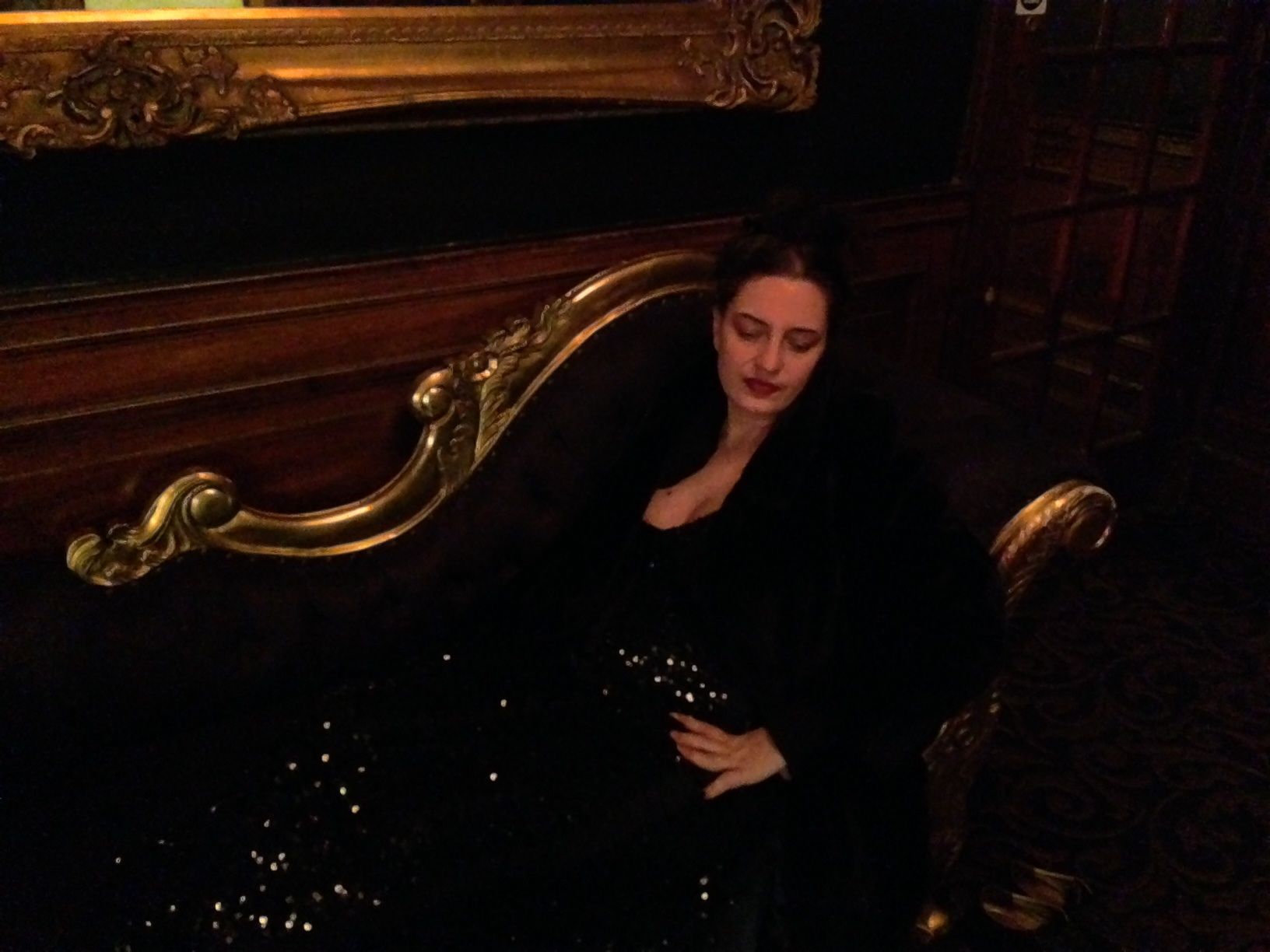
- Website: annepigalle.com

Anne Pigalle is a French singer and multimedia artist (writer, musician, art performer, poet, photographer and painter).

== Biography ==
=== Early career ===
Pigalle grew up in Montmartre, Paris. As a teenager, she played guitar in an all-female band, hanging out with punk musicians in Paris and London. She attended the Sex Pistols gig at the Chalet du Lac in 1976. She appeared in magazines such as BLITZ, i-D, Magazine No. 2, Grabuge and Façade.

In the early 1980s, she moved to London, performed in clubs such as Vic Godard's Subway Sect Club Left at the Wag Club in Soho made a recording of "Love For Sale" produced by Adrian Sherwood released on Illuminated Records and recorded for Channel 4 an opera called The Kiss, written by Michael Nyman and produced by David Cunningham. She then signed a contract with Trevor Horn 's label ZTT Records and released an album on ZTT/Island Records in 1985 called Everything Could Be So Perfect.

In 1986, Pigalle revamped Café de Paris, a club in Piccadilly Soho, London, with a new concept: Les Nuits Du Mercredi. She also played at Ronnie Scott's Jazz Club.

In 1988, Anne took part in the French tour Rock En France, 7 days, 7 French cities including Le Rex in Paris and with such bands as Noir Desir, numerous articles glorifying the artist followed.

She was photographed by Lord Snowdon, Mario Testino and Nick Knight; her music and image were used in Japanese TV commercials for Jean-Paul Gaultier and Karl Lagerfeld. Around that time she toured Japan and Europe. In 1989, she performed for TV arts programme The South Bank Show for the anniversary of the French Revolution. Other TV appearances included The Tube (in the UK), Ardisson's Bains de Minuit et Jean-Patrick Capdevielle Totems du Bataclan (in France), Japan and Mexico.

Pigalle left ZTT Records at the end of the 1980s and produced and starred in a Japanese commercial for Isetan department store with her song "Tango Contre La Montre" (on YouTube).

She was voted fifth Best Performer of the Year by Los Angeles radio station KCRW Morning Becomes Eclectic. She played a show at Chateau Marmont, Los Angeles, as well as Johnny Depp's club The Viper Room.

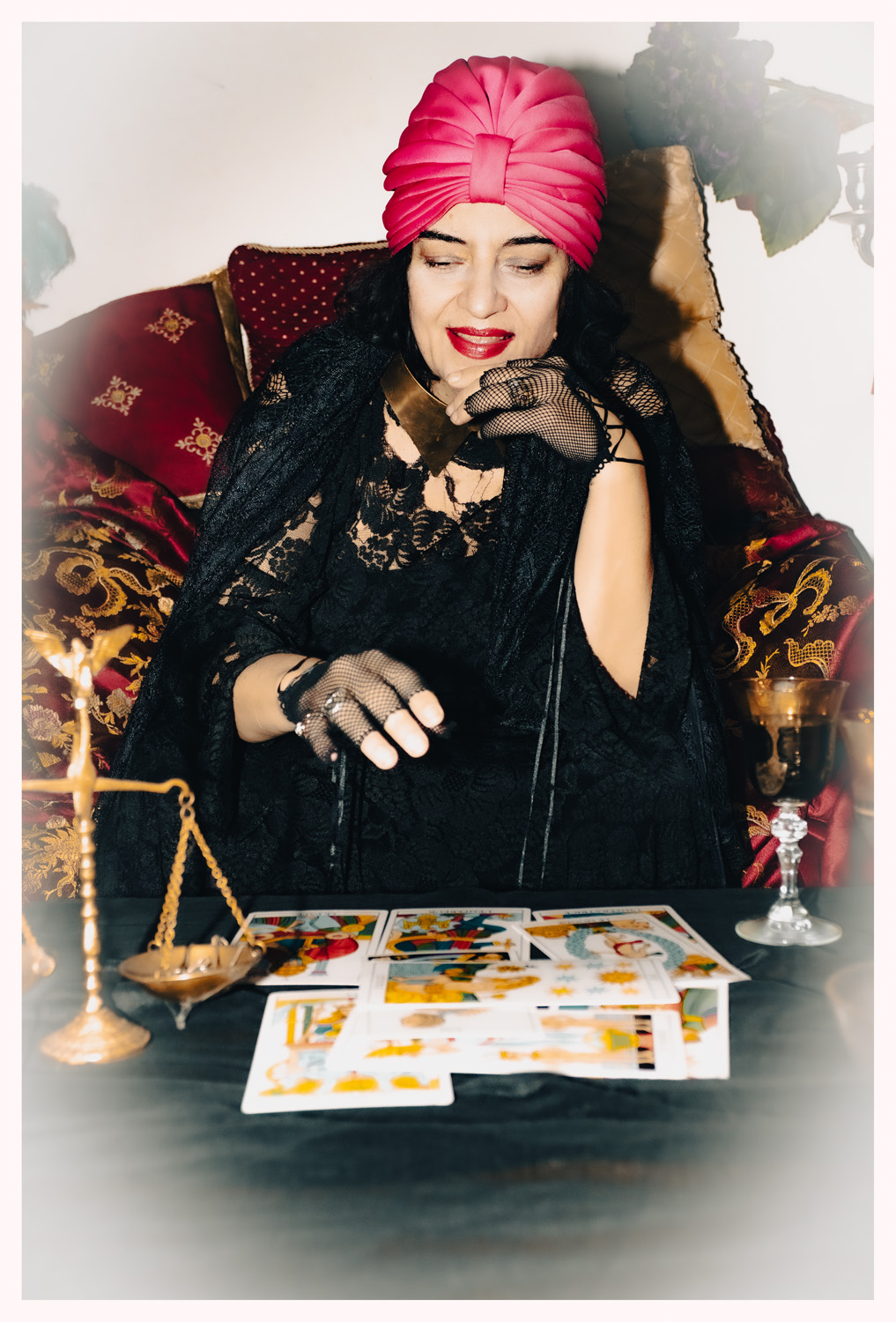
Anne Pigalle Reading The tarot. London 2026

=== More recent career ===
From 2001, mostly in London, Pigalle produced home movies and videos, electronic tracks, Polaroid self-portraits, paintings, poems, curated events in nightclubs, wrote an autobiographical screenplay, appeared in films, developed her art performances and the Amerotic Salons. The Amerotic Salon has been performed at The Colony Room and at Glastonbury Festival. From 2005 to 2007, she exhibited her paintings and self-portrait Polaroids (for which she created visual sets, erotic masks and crowns of flowers) at the Charing Cross Gallery, Michael Hoppen gallery, and the Aquarium Gallery. She called her art 'amerotic' ('âme' means 'soul' in French). In 2007, she launched a night at the Grill Room, Café Royal, called Spirit of Ecstasy, where she performed a futuristic cabaret show along with bohemian poets. In 2009 and 2010, she sang at shows in Mexico and at the Tuareg Festival au Désert in Timbuktu, Mali, Africa. Some electronic tracks appeared on YouTube, still unreleased commercially, co-written with TDS . With My Blonde, The Jewel, Journey through Europe and more ...

Hailed as the Queen of Soho by stars photographer John Stoddard during his exhibition at L'Escargot(restaurant) for years of services rendered to Soho

In 2010 and 2011, Pigalle released the trilogy, L'âmerotica Part I and II on iTunes - 21 surreal and erotic vignettes of poetry set to music. In 2013 she released a collection of new songs and erotic poems called Madame Sex. In 2015, she released Madame Sex and L'ame Erotique as an art CD, and played live concerts in London. In spring 2015, Pigalle created 'La nuit Amerotique', a new venture night in Soho, with a new philosophy, performing various material relating to Pigalle, Soho, Art and Eroticism, in various locations. She included her poetry from Madame Sex and invited performance artists who have lived and worked in Soho to illustrate and share the show. In 2016 she performed a show at the National Portrait Gallery, London. In summer 2016, she played an art show, Not Dead at the G511ERY Gallery, dedicated to her late mother. Hai In autumn-winter 2016/2017, Pigalle created the Madame Sex art performances in Pigalle, France, and followed up in the bars of Soho. In spring 2017, Anne organises an art show at Soho's We Are Cuts institution, Les P'tites Femmes De Soho, dedicated to nightlife's little women. In autumn 2017 she organised a multi-media evening in Soho, Soho Mon Amour, at the 01 zero studios. She performed again at the National Portrait Gallery in London during its Cézanne exhibition. She celebrated the 40th anniversary of punk with an art show and a concert of punk songs in Hackney Wick called 'Never Mind Jackson Bollocks, Here's Anne Pigalle...'

2018: Performance of "Memo from Turner" for the 50th anniversary of the film Performance in Powis Square. Donald Cammell and Nick Roeg with Mick Jagger, organised by Tom Vague . Donald Cammell was a friend of Anne's

October 2018: vinyl album release of Ecstase in Soho — 10 songs written and produced by Pigalle accompanied with film. Musicians guests includes Glen Matlock, original bass player of the Sex Pistols, Terry Edwards of Gallon Drunk and Paul Robinson (Nina Simone). The photography for the cover are Anne's own self-portraits and graphics by Malcolm Garrett. 2019. Pigalle's image is used on a collage board at the entrance the Centre Choreographique National d'Orleans by Agnes B in connection with a touring exhibition Les Jeunes Gens Modernes on French New Wave.

April 2019: release of the CD Ecstase with a multimedia show at the Horse Hospital in London;

October 2019: Pigalle is the award winner for best art film for the multi media project Ecstase at the Portobello Film Festival, 2019.

January 2020: Soho Extravaganza performance concert at century Soho with guests Ray Gange, Jenny Runacre, Museum of Soho, and Phil Dirtbox;

June 2020: Pigalle participated in the Adelaide Cabaret Festival, the largest cabaret festival in the world with two film bites for the special COVID-19 edition, replacing a scheduled live performance;

Summer 2020: Pigalle organised safe musical picnics in various bandstands including Regent's Park, Parliament Hill Fields and St Anne's Gardens in Soho;

September to November 2020: Pigalle's Album Ecstase is featured in an exhibition at Switzerland Chur's Museum of Modern Art, Bünder Kunstmuseum, titled Dance Me til the End of Love along with work by others including Andy Warhol, Man Ray, Neil Young and David Bowie. Autumn 2020: Pigalle continued producing her Ecstase hand painted art masks;

February 2021. Release of various tracks on Bandcamp. Live stream concert for Valentine's Day; March 2021. Winner of the Facebook app Uk Poets in London for Women History Month and World Poetry day 21/3/2021;

1 October 2021: Release of a limited hand painted edition art EP live in the studio, The Deal five new tracks produced by Anne Pigalle, 200 hand painted limited edition, on her website exclusively;

January 2022: Paints the front cover for Subway Sect's special edition vinyl album Moments like these, produced by Mick Jones, on Gnu Inc. Recordings; the painting itself hangs in Mick Jones' house

February 2022: performance in Soho's art deco Crazy Coqs Cabaret & Jazz Club at Brasserie Zedel;

April 2022: curated and performed in multi-media group show The Mavericks of Naive Fetichism, with 11 artists featuring Mark McGowan, Stewart Home, Ray Gange, Jenny Runacre, Vic Godard, Simon Ould, Tom Vague, at 41 Frith Street, We Are Cuts, Soho, London.

August 2022: Anne performs some of her songs at Andrew Logan festival of Love in Wales

December 2022 : Nomination Number 43 for Paul Weller The Prisoner Portmeirion cape club, following Debbie Harry's nomination among many others.

February 2023 : a commemoration concert for Henri Paul Tortosa (Johnny Thunders, The Maniacs, and Festival punk de Mont-de-Marsan original guitarist) at the Dublin Castle featuring original member Chris Musto. Reviewed in Louder Than War

Spring 2024 : Screening of The Soho Connection ( part I ) as part of the exploding cinema festival at the new Cinema Museum London

May/June 2024 : Multi media show at Farsight Gallery, The Soho Connection, off Denmark Street with art, paintings, film, Q&A with Chris Salewicz, and performances (see Fad write up in references)

June 2024, launches La Nuit Amérotique at The St Moritz club in Soho, a modern cabaret based on the original radical cabaret Le Chat Noir in Paris, Review below, night of Dec 4th Anne; Andrew Loog Oldham, the original manager of The Rolling Stones, takes an interest and makes suggestions

January 2025 : poetry performances at the New Colony Room includes Charles Baudelaire, William Blake, Arthur Rimbaud and her own Amérotique poetry followed in March and April with performances at Kabinett Gallery Berlin and London

June 2025, William Blake performance protest with the Blake congregation, in front of Blake house at 17 South Molton St, to preserve the house as a cultural center

December 2025 : multi media art salon and performance La Nuit Amérotique at Farsight Gallery

January 2026 : Anne resumes her tarot performances with La Femme Ensorceleuse

June 2026 Anarchie dans le UK: performance + Q&A about the French chapter of Punk with Chris Salewicz and Travis Elborough at the Dublin Castle, Camden press article in the Camden New Journal

September 2026 Anne Pigalle is crowned The Queen of Soho by Ed Tudor Pole for the City of Westminster in Soho Square Westminster. The Queen of Soho is also the title of her new song

== Albums ==
- Everything Could Be So Perfect (ZTT Records, 1985)
- L'Amérotica I and II (iTunes, 2010/2011)
- L'Ame Erotique (iTunes, 2011)
- Madame Sex (2013)
- Madame Sex And L'ame Erotique (2014)
- Madame Sex Cd & L'Ame Erotique (2017)
- Ecstase (vinyl, A Pigallissimo Recording, 2018; CD, 2019, Bandcamp 2021)
- The Deal - A 5 tracks Ep, (200 limited art edition Oct 2021)
- 'If Desire Is A Sin, Bandcamp June 2026 (100 downloads)
