= List of films with high frame rates =

This is a list of films with high frame rates. Only films with a native shooting and projection frame rate of 48 or higher, for all or some of its scenes, are included, as are films that received an official post-production using technologies such as TrueCut Motion. This is at least double the 24 frames per second (fps) standard used in Hollywood. Several of these films also have versions which are converted and projected at 24 fps.

== Films ==
The following list is sorted by release year. There are only 2 films in 4K 60 fps on Blu-ray.

Year	Title	Director	Language	FPS	Notes	Ref.
1978	Night of Dreams	Douglas Trumbull	English	60	Showscan	
1983	New Magic	Douglas Trumbull	English	60	Showscan	
1992	Momentum	Colin Low, Tony Ianzelo	English	48	IMAX HD	
1994	Hoop Dreams	Steve James	English	60	Shot on interlaced 60 fps Betacam. Shown in theaters in 24 fps. Original 60 fps presentation restored with the 20th anniversary restoration.	
1997	Titanic	James Cameron	English	48	Converted with TrueCut Motion, re-release February 10, 2023.	
1998	Festen	Thomas Vinterberg	Danish, English	50	Shot on digital video in interlaced 50 fps. Shown in theaters in 24 fps. The original 50 fps presentation is not in any home video release.	
1998	Love & Pop	Hideaki Anno	Japanese	60	Shot on digital video in interlaced 60 fps, with some scenes shot on 35 mm movie film in 24 fps. Shown in theaters in 24 fps and in interlaced 60 fps with 24 fps scenes on DVD and Blu-ray.	
1999	The Blair Witch Project	Daniel Myrick, Eduardo Sanchez	English	60	Shot on Hi8 in interlaced 60 fps, with some scenes shot on 16 mm film in 24 fps. Shown in theaters, VHS, DVD, and Blu-ray in 24 fps. The 2024 remastered Blu-ray from Second Sight is presented in interlaced 60 fps with 24 fps segments.	
2001	Soarin' Over California	Rick Rothschild	English	48	IMAX HD, Disney California Adventure ride	
2006	Inland Empire	David Lynch	English, Polish	60	Shot on digital video in interlaced 60 fps. Shown in theaters at 24 fps. The original 60 fps presentation is not in any home video release.	
2009	Avatar	James Cameron	English	48	Converted with TrueCut Motion, re-released September 23, 2022. The HFR presentation is available on Disney+ with Apple Vision Pro.	
2012	The Hobbit: An Unexpected Journey	Peter Jackson	English	48		
2013	The Hobbit: The Desolation of Smaug	Peter Jackson	English	48		
2013	FlyOver Canada	Rick Rothschild	English	60	4K, Canada Place ride	
2014	Lucid Dreams of Gabriel	Sasha A. Schriber	English	48	Short film	
2014	The Hobbit: The Battle of the Five Armies	Peter Jackson	English	48		
2016	Billy Lynn's Long Halftime Walk	Ang Lee	English	120	DVD and Blu-ray rendered at 24 fps. Blu-ray 4K UHD rendered at 60 fps.	
2016	Meridian	Curtis Clark	English	60	Short film	
2016	Wings over Washington	Brent Young	English	60	Flying Theater Attraction, filmed in 5K at 60fps	
2017	Flamenco	Demetri Portelli	English	120 3D / 192 2D	Short film, projected at 24 & 60 fps after RealD TrueMotion processing	
2017	Sleep Has Her House	Scott Barley	English, No dialogue	60	Shot on iPhone 6 Plus digital video at 60 fps, and converted to 24 fps for projection. Blu-ray rendered at 24 fps.	
2018	Aquarela	Victor Kossakovsky	Russian, English, Spanish	96	Documentary, projected at 48 fps	
2018	Hometown	Bao Dejun	Chinese	48	First short film produced in China with 8K 48 fps	
2019	Gemini Man	Ang Lee	English	120	DVD and Blu-ray rendered at 24 fps. Blu-ray 4K UHD rendered at 60 fps.	
2022	Avatar: The Way of Water	James Cameron	English	48	Shot entirely at 48 fps. 24 fps scenes are achieved by duplicating frames. The HFR presentation is available on Disney+ with Apple Vision Pro.	
2023	The Last Heretic / El Ultimo Hereje	Daniel de la Vega	Spanish	48	First Latin-American movie shot in HFR.	
2024	Argylle	Matthew Vaughn	English	48	Converted with TrueCut Motion.	
2024	Kung Fu Panda 4	Mike Mitchell	English	48	Converted with TrueCut Motion. First fully-animated theatrical feature to be rendered in HFR.	
2024	Godzilla x Kong: The New Empire	Adam Wingard	English	48	Converted with TrueCut Motion.	
2024	The Wild Robot	Chris Sanders	English	48	Converted with TrueCut Motion.	
2025	Jurassic World Rebirth	Gareth Edwards	English	48	Converted with TrueCut Motion.	
2025	The Bad Guys 2	Pierre Perifel	English	48	Converted with TrueCut Motion.	
2025	Nobody 2	Timo Tjahjanto	English	48	Converted with TrueCut Motion.	
2025	Avatar: Fire and Ash	James Cameron	English	48	Shot entirely at 48 fps. 24 fps scenes are achieved by duplicating frames.	
2025	Animal Farm	Andy Serkis	English	48	HFR	

== See also ==
- Digital Cinema Package
