= Remodernist film =

Film genre

Remodernist Film
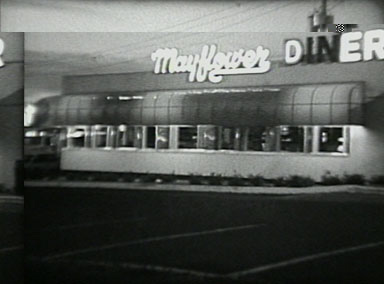
- Jesse Richards and Nicholas Watson. Shooting at the Moon. A still from an early Super-8 Remodernist film.
- Years active: 2004 - present
- Location: United States, United Kingdom, Netherlands, Iran
- Major figures: Jesse Richards, Harris Smith, Peter Rinaldi
- Influences: DIY culture, Stuckism, No Wave Cinema, French Impressionist Cinema, punk film, French New Wave, American independent film

Remodernist film developed in the United States and the United Kingdom in the early 21st century with ideas related to those of the international art movement Stuckism and its manifesto, Remodernism. Key figures are Jesse Richards and Peter Rinaldi.

== Manifesto and philosophy ==
On August 27, 2008, Jesse Richards published a 15-point Remodernist Film Manifesto, calling for a "new spirituality in cinema", use of intuition in filmmaking, as well as describing the remodernist film as being a "stripped down, minimal, lyrical, punk kind of filmmaking". Point 4 is:

The Japanese ideas of wabi-sabi (the beauty of imperfection) and mono no aware (the awareness of the transience of things and the bittersweet feelings that accompany their passing), have the ability to show the truth of existence, and should always be considered when making the remodernist film.

There are also several polemic statements made in the manifesto that criticize Stanley Kubrick, filmmakers that shoot on digital video, as well as Dogme 95. In December, 2008, Turkish film magazine Bakiniz translated the manifesto into Turkish and soon after Polish magazine Red translated it into Polish.

The remodernist school argues for a return to what it considers emotional and spiritual meaning in cinema, as well as an emphasis on new ideas of narrative structure and subjectivity. Elements of No Wave Cinema, French New Wave, punk film, expressionist, spiritual and transcendental filmmaking, as well as Antonin Artaud's ideas on the Theatre of Cruelty helped lead to this new film movement. They champion the works of Andrei Tarkovsky, Yasujirō Ozu, Robert Bresson, Jean Rollin, Michelangelo Antonioni, Jean Vigo, Amos Poe, Jean Epstein and Nicholas Ray among others, as well as Béla Tarr's film Satantango and Jean-Luc Godard's Hail Mary.

== History ==
The idea of Stuckism in relation to filmmaking and photography started 2001 when Jesse Richards and Nicholas Watson began releasing work as The New Haven Stuckists Film Group. On March 8, 2008, their film Shooting at the Moon made its London premiere at Horse Hospital during its FLIXATION Underground Cinema Club event. Remodernist Film and Photography was founded by Richards and Smith in 2004.

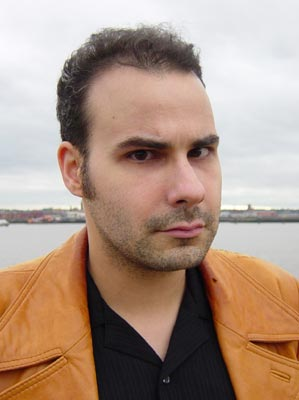
Jesse Richards

Films later seen as Remodernist included Youngblood (1995) by Harris Smith, Shooting at the Moon (1998–2003) by Jesse Richards and Nicholas Watson, and Medway Bus Ride (1999) by Wolf Howard.

Amos Poe is part of the movement, which he said was "just a bunch of kids." He said in 2008:

I guess remodernist is the next variation of post-modernist, which is to take something that was in the culture before and then turn it into something else, like taking it out of context. So it's kind of what pop art was in a way. I was using Warhol as kind of a soup can. It's like redoing that but it's done in a completely remodernist way because it's using the technology and the sensibility of contemporary rather than nostalgia.

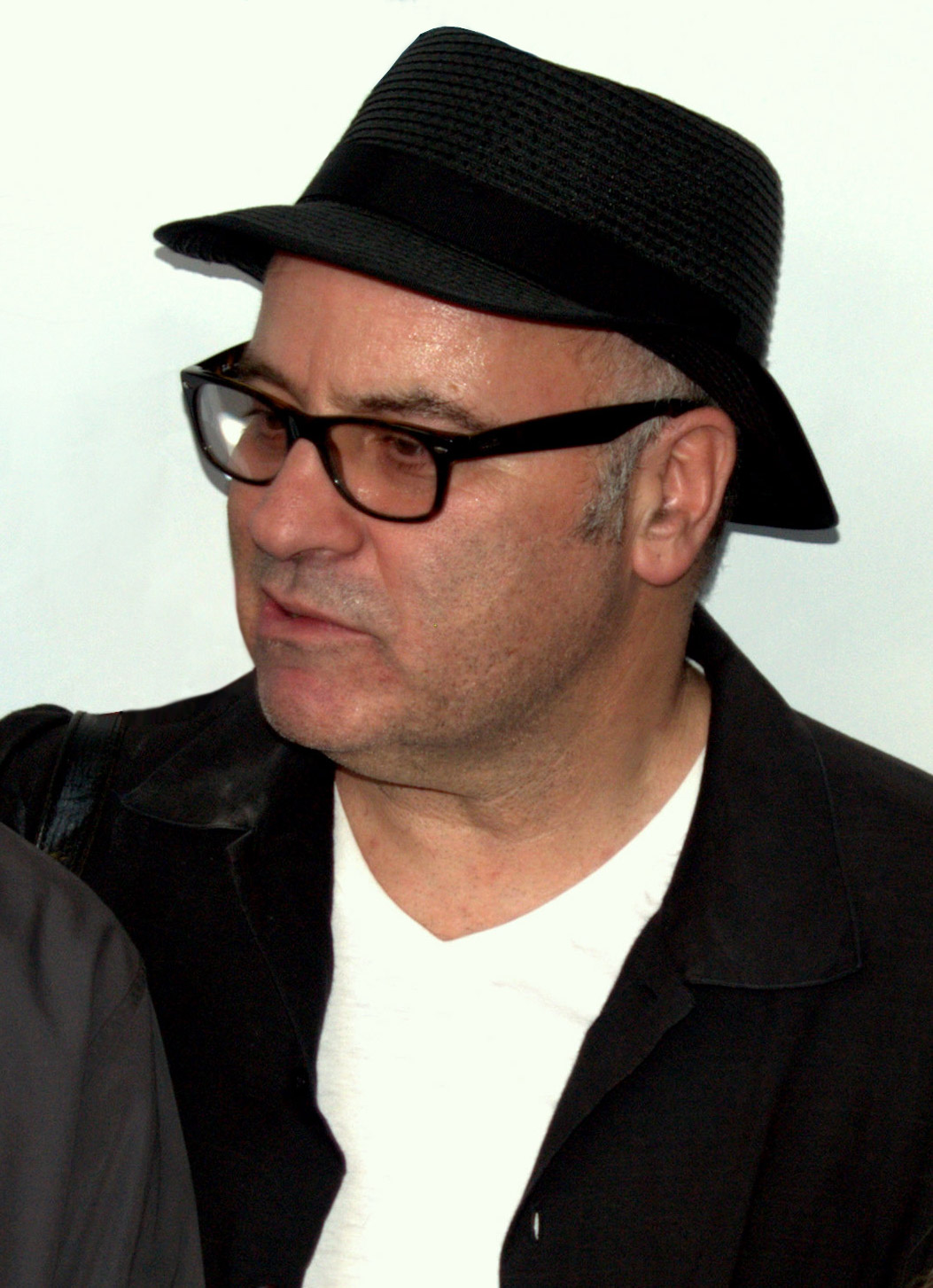
Amos Poe

In late August, 2009, an International Alliance of Remodernist Filmmakers was started by Jesse Richards in order to promote discussion and collaboration amongst those following the manifesto. The filmmakers include Jesse Richards, Harris Smith, Christopher Michael Beer, Dmitri Trakovsky, Kate Shults, Peter Rinaldi and Khurrem Gold of America, Roy Rezaali of Holland, Rouzbeh Rashidi of Iran and Dean Kavanagh of Ireland.

In October, 2009, with the intention "to further develop and explain Remodernist film concepts", a series of articles by Jesse Richards, Peter Rinaldi and Roy Rezaali were published in the magazine MungBeing.

Richards said, "Remodernism rejected Postmodernism for its 'failure to answer or address any important issues of being a human being'", and that Remodernism is "about seeking truth, establishing meaningful connections" and "addressing the shadow".

In his essay Concepts and Craft in Remodernist Film, Richards said that Remodernist film craft "embraces the amateur", involves the idea of filmmakers "teaching themselves to paint pictures, to try acting in their own movies and those of others (especially if they are shy), to be nude models for other artists, to meditate, worship if they are religious, to do things that affect their levels of consciousness, try things that make them nervous or uncomfortable, to go out and be involved in life, to find adventure, to jump in the ocean. I think that is the exploration of craft".

The article explains the differences between modernist, post-modernist and remodernist cinema, describing Robert Bresson and Andrei Tarkovsky as "early Remodernist filmmakers", and notes films that make emphasis of "small moments", including Béla Tarr's film Satantango, "...every moment of the film Satantango is a good example of this kind of exploration of "moments"- the film starts with a ten-minute shot following cows coming out of a barn and wandering around a run-down agriculture collective. These kinds of moments are all but ignored in most examples of modern cinema, and that's a terrible, terrible thing".

Richards says of Remodernist filmmaking:

I believe that the most effective way to really make subjective and authentic work involves an "addressing of the shadow" (as Billy Childish and Charles Thomson have described it). Now what does this mean exactly? It might mean that you are really obsessed with pubic hair, or maybe you are really embarrassed by a physical or mental disability that you try to hide, or like Billy Childish, you were abused as a child. These things, these "shadows" that we are hiding within ourselves, need to be brought forth into the light of day - in our films, in our work, in our poetry.

In another article, entitled A Quick Primer and History, Richards relaxes the criticism in the manifesto against digital video, noting that it can "have a place in Remodernist cinema" but that it should be given a new language, and that it currently "mimic(s) film". The article also broadens the aim of the movement, explaining the common bond among Remodernist filmmakers being a search for truth, knowledge, authenticity and spirituality in their work, but having different approaches on achieving that goal.

Peter Rinaldi, analyzes the manifesto and shares his "personal thoughts" on it in his essay, The Shore as seen from The Deep Sea. Particularly, he defends the criticism of digital and later of Stanley Kubrick, saying first, "for the most part, the ‘easiness’ of video has led to degradation in the images created", and:

I think, for the most part, the generation that I grew up in had Kubrick as their Giant. His work has a mystical "perfectionism" that is awe-inspiring at times. This perfectionism is anathema to the Remodernist mentality and for many healthy reasons, this giant (or whatever giant towers over your work) must fall in our minds. We must become the giant.

The rest of the article draws direct connections between ideas in the manifesto and some Christian and Buddhist teachings.

In June 2010, after publishing a letter from Richards about the Remodernist Film Manifesto on his site, film critic Roger Ebert tweeted, "Much discussed on serious film blogs: The Remodernist Film Manifesto. Lars von Trier, get out of town".

=== In Passing, Feature-length collaboration ===
In February 2010, the Australian film magazine Filmink announced the forthcoming production of a compilation feature film being made by members of the Remodernist film movement, which the magazine says "recalls art movements of the late 19th and early 20th centuries which saw artists attempting to strive toward artistic freedom and authenticity". The film, which will consist of ten-minute pieces by various members of the film movement "from around the globe", is scheduled to premiere in December, 2010 in New York. Participating filmmakers include: Peter Rinaldi, Kate Shults, Rouzbeh Rashidi, Dean Kavanagh, Roy Rezaali, Heidi Beaver and Christopher Michael Beer. Richards' Remodernist Film Manifesto "forms the basis" of the joint project.

The film's premiere was announced for November 13, 2011 at the Quad Cinemas in New York City.

In the November 2011 print edition of Filmink, film scholar, critic and programmer Jack Sargeant wrote about the movement and In Passing, referring to the movement as "the new personal cinema" and describing the evolution of "lyrical cinema" from the work of Andrei Tarkovsky, Wim Wenders, Jim Jarmusch, Béla Tarr and through to the Remodernist filmmakers.

Sargeant goes on to describe In Passing:

The film is neither a fully experimental work, nor a movie fixated on classic narrative; rather, In Passing explores the passing of time and the relation of time to cinematic space. Often focusing on intimate yet small details – the table top exploration of a crustacean, the patter of rain on a window, cats at play, the ocean shot from a moving car, a couple looking into a camera knowing that the film they are making will fail – and finding something lyrically poignant and even personal within these transient moments. There are scenes in which people seem to vanish, no longer seen onscreen, yet the space they once occupied still resonates with their echoes, moving through the poetic sublime.In common with Wim Wenders, Jim Jarmusch and Gus Van Sant, and films like Meek's Cutoff, there is a sense of homesickness to the films that make up In Passing. This sense of homesickness is not necessarily rooted in a sense of being away from home, but in the sense that even at home, the protagonists are still searching for their place within the day-to-day world.

== Examples of Remodernist films ==
- Shooting at the Moon - Jesse Richards and Nicholas Watson, (1998–2003)
- Closure of Catharsis - Rouzbeh Rashidi, (2011)
- Films of Fred Kelemen (who wrote the 1990 manifesto of Poetic Compressionism - PoCo)
- The Turin Horse - Béla Tarr and Ágnes Hranitzky (2011)
- Sleep Has Her House - Scott Barley (2017)

== See also ==
- Mumblecore
- Slow cinema
- No wave cinema
- Cinéma pur
- Underground film
- Stuckism Photography
- Postmodernist film
- Modernist film
- Minimalist and maximalist film
