= Cine Foundation International =

UK non-governmental organisation

Cine Artist Foundation International
- Founded: 2010
- Founder: Tobias Morgan, Jesse Richards, & Blue Un Sok Kim
- Type: Non-profit; NGO
- Purpose: Protecting Human Rights, Protecting Freedom of Speech, Using Cinema as a Tool for Conflict resolution
- Location(s): Global; Main Office in London, UK
- Region served: Global
- Method: Direct actions
- Key people: Blue Un Sok Kim, Chair, co-founder and Board of Directors; Tobias Morgan, founder, Chair (until Autumn 2011), registered company owner, now secretary Jesse Richards, co-founder, Chair until 2012, Board of Directors; Béla Tarr, Board of Directors; Lav Diaz, Board of Directors; Fred Kelemen, Board of Directors,
- Website: www.cinefoundation.org www.whitemeadows.org

Cine Foundation International is London-based non-profit film company and human rights NGO "aiming to 'empower open consciousness through cinema'". The foundation was formed in December 2010 by American filmmaker Jesse Richards, founder of the Remodernist film movement, South Korean film critic Blue Un Sok Kim and Tobias Morgan, formerly the developer of "The Garage" on Mubi.

On 3 January 2011, CFI announced their launch of a campaign of protest films and public actions calling for the release of imprisoned Iranian filmmaker Jafar Panahi. "The campaign will include protest films that speak to human rights issues in Iran and throughout the world, six of which are commissioned feature-length, plus twenty shorts. Participating filmmakers may act anonymously or through pseudonyms since voicing their stories can be dangerous. The films, which will address themes of nation, identity, self, spiritual culture, censorship and imprisonment, will be aimed for public, web and various exhibition media". In January 2011, filmmakers Béla Tarr and Lav Diaz joined the foundation's Board of Directors, and in February Fred Kelemen joined the Board of Directors.

Also in January 2011, CFI deployed a video protest mechanism called WHITE MEADOWS (named for the Mohammad Rasoulof film of the same title) and developed by Ericson deJesus (of Yahoo! and frog design) at the request of the foundation. The video mechanism "allow(s) anyone in the world to record a short video statement about Panahi and Rasoulof. There will be an ESCAPE button at top, allowing quick exit for those in countries where recording a statement would be dangerous. There will be an option to have the screen black, and soon, voice distortion. The video statements will be recorded as mp4s, giving them maximum transmedia capacity, which essentially makes them broadcastable from any device that can show video". Users can also use the mechanism to comment on how they would "like to see as an international response by the film industry", comment on the state of human rights in general, or to "report a human rights abuse to the world".

Late in 2011, CFI launched #OccupyCinema, an ongoing collective project in collaboration with the global Occupy movement. The project encompasses "public space projections onto buildings or other public surfaces—broadcasting films, video documents or live feeds, with the intention of decentralising traditional broadcast monopolies and information power structures where these interfere with freedom of speech or otherwise compel human beings to surrender to the agendas of ethically bankrupt regimes." On November 1, #OccupyCinema will launch public displays of films in New York City, Dallas, Kansas, London and Paris, with more to follow over the next week.

Tobias Morgan resigned as Chair in Autumn 2011, having been commissioned to make a Cine Foundation International feature film dedicated to the Iranian film producer Katayoun Shahabi. Jesse Richards resigned in 2012, and Blue Un Sok Kim took the Chair.
