= Harris Smith =

Harris Smith may refer to:

- Plaxico Burress, NFL player who used this name as an alias
- Harris Smith (filmmaker), filmmaker and essayist, co-founder of Remodernist film
