= Harris Smith (filmmaker) =

American filmmaker (born 1977)

Harris Smith (born May 8, 1977) is an American filmmaker, media critic and essayist from New York City. He is one of the founding members of the Remodernist film movement and was a participating member of the first comprehensive Remodernist exhibition in the United States, Addressing the Shadow and Making Friends with Wild Dogs: Remodernism.

== Life and work ==
Smith was born in Washington, D.C., and moved to New York City in 1995. In 2004, he co-founded the "Remodernist" film movement with Jesse Richards, with the aim of promoting a "new spirituality in cinema". Also in 2004, Smith contributed to the book Captured: A Film and Video History of the Lower East Side, edited by Clayton Patterson and published by Seven Stories Press. The book documented the No Wave Cinema movement of the 1970s.

Since 2010, Smith has been the host of the radio program "Negative Pleasure" on Newtown Radio. His directing credits include the punk films Youngblood (1995), featuring music and poetry by Billy Childish; Modern Young Man (1999), which starred Tom Jarmusch, Kid Congo Powers and William "Bill" Rice; You Can't See Me When I Hide (2003); and I Can't Look at You (2004).

In February 2010, the Australian film magazine Filmink announced Smith's participation in a compilation feature film by the Remodernist film movement. The film is scheduled to premiere in New York in December 2010.

From 2009-2011, Smith taught writing and literature in the humanities department at School of the Visual Arts. From 2011-2017, he worked in the comic book industry as a production coordinator at comiXology. Additionally, he has edited the comics anthologies Jeans, Night Burgers and Felony Comics. Among the cartoonists he has published or collaborated with are Benjamin Marra, Lale Westvind, Zach Hazard Vaupen, Alabaster Pizzo, Leah Wishnia, Rich Tommaso, Alex Degen, Laura Callaghan, Josh Burggraf, Victor Kerlow, Benjamin Urkowitz and many others. His most frequent collaborators are Pete Toms and Thomas Slattery.

From 2014-2017, Smith hosted regular film screenings at the Spectacle Theater in Williamsburg, Brooklyn. Centered on the release of new issues of Felony Comics, these screenings include obscure and odd action, crime and horror movies from the 1960s, 1970s, 1980s and 1990s, with an emphasis on the 1980s. Most films shown are low-budget, regional productions. Many are from Mexico. Smith has also contributed to Spectacle's ongoing kung-fu matinee, Fist Church, and their yearly pre-Halloween horror movie marathon.

== See also ==
- Remodernist Film
- Jesse Richards
- Peter Rinaldi
- Rouzbeh Rashidi

== Other sources ==
- The Villager
- Ed. Frank Milner (2004), "The Stuckists Punk Victorian" National Museums Liverpool, ISBN 1-902700-27-9
