= Peter Rinaldi =

- Born: Old Forge, Pennsylvania
- Occupation(s): Film director, producer and screenwriter

Peter Rinaldi is a filmmaker and writer from New York, NY and is affiliated with the Remodernist film movement.

In February 2010, the Australian film magazine Filmink announced Rinaldi's participation in a compilation feature film by the Remodernist film movement. The film is scheduled to premiere in New York in December 2010.

In the 28th issue of MungBeing magazine, Rinaldi participated in a series of articles outlining Remodernist film concepts. He analyzed the manifesto and shared his "personal thoughts" on it in his essay, The Shore as seen from The Deep Sea. Particularly, he defends the criticism of digital and later of Stanley Kubrick, saying first, "for the most part, the "easiness" of video has led to degradation in the images created", and:

I think, for the most part, the generation that I grew up in had Kubrick as their Giant. His work has a mystical "perfectionism" that is awe-inspiring at times. This perfectionism is anathema to the Remodernist mentality and for many healthy reasons, this giant (or whatever giant towers over your work) must fall in our minds. We must become the giant.

The rest of the article draws direct connections between ideas in the manifesto and some Christian and Buddhist teachings.

== See also ==
- Remodernist Film
- Jesse Richards
- Harris Smith
- Rouzbeh Rashidi
