= Spectacle Theater =

Independent movie theater in New York City

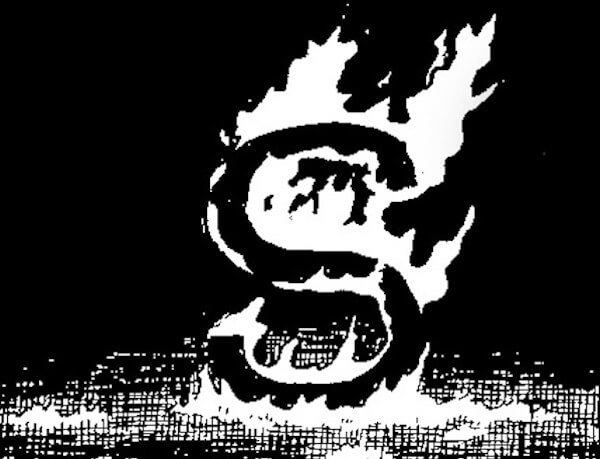
- Logo of Spectacle Theater, a black capital S wreathed in white flames
- Interactive map of Spectacle Theater
- Address: 124 S. 3rd Street, Brooklyn, New York, 11249, United States
- Coordinates: 40°42′46.1″N 73°57′46.2″W
- Type: Movie theater

Construction
- Opened: 2010

Spectacle Theater is a collectively run, independent movie theater that operates out of a small space in the Williamsburg neighborhood of Brooklyn in New York City, United States.

== History ==
Spectacle Theater opened in September 2010 at 124 S. 3rd Street in Brooklyn in a space that used to be a bodega. From its beginning, the theater was dedicated to showing rare, independent, or arthouse films (that cannot be found on DVD) at $5 per ticket.

In 2013, Spectacle was awarded the "Best Weird Repertory Film Programming" by The Village Voice.

After a rent increase and lease-mandated improvements in 2015, the theater ran a Kickstarter campaign to keep operating out of the same space in central Williamsburg. The campaign was successful and the theater stayed open at its location at 124 S. 3rd Street.

As of 2017, the theater also runs a weekly radio show at Newtown Radio, where volunteers discuss music and film.

== Venue ==
Spectacle Theater is a 35-seat microcinema. The Theater is run by collective members and screenings are everyday. Spectacle collective members print their own posters for each screening, which are displayed outside the theater. The outside of the theater is unadorned, aside from the posters, and painted black.

== Programming ==
Spectacle screens films seven days a week, often including midnight screenings and biweekly matinees, including "Blood Brunch" for horror films,"Fist Church" for kung fu films, and "Anime No Go Go" for OVA's. Programs are selected by the collective, who prepare promotional materials like trailers, pamphlets and posters, as well as run the projector during shows. Spectacle has hosted the first-ever U.S. retrospectives of filmmakers such as Roland Klick, Rogério Sganzerla, Antero Alli, Iara Lee, Dore O., Leida Laius, Andrew Horn, Tadeusz Konwicki, Katrina del Mar, Sarah Minter, Sidney Sokhona, Alyce Wittenstein, and many others. The collective members also cut and edit their own trailers for screenings and series presented at the theater. These trailers often mimic and mock the iconography of the MPAA film rating system. Screenings sometimes have different formats like "VHS nights", talks, live-score shows, and Q&As with directors.
