= Nicholas Watson =

American filmmaker (born 1977)

Nicholas Watson (born July 9, 1977) is a social entrepreneur based in Pennsylvania, United States.

He was previously a producer and writer in film and television. He co-founded the New Haven Stuckist art group.

== Social enterprise career ==
Nicholas Watson has worked in social enterprise development in the United States since 2009. He previously held the position of Vice President for Social Enterprise at Housing Works in New York City. He was also the founding Director of Social Enterprise at Project H.O.M.E. in Philadelphia.

== Life and art ==
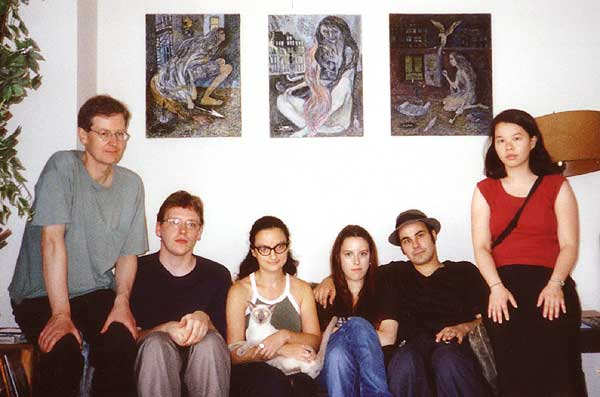
Left to right: Charles Thomson, Nicholas Watson, Terry Marks, Marisa Shepherd, Jesse Richards and Catherine Chow in Marks' New York apartment in 2001.

Nicholas Watson has worked on films with Jesse Richards since 1997. In 2001, Watson co-founded the New Haven, Connecticut chapter of the Stuckism art movement with Richards. Stuckism was started in Britain by Billy Childish and Charles Thomson in 1999. Watson said, "We create art in order to create an emotional connection. There's such a rampant element of falseness in [conceptual] artwork. I'm very comfortable saying most of it is not for real."

He was part of the group that founded and ran the Stuckism International Centre USA, an art gallery in New Haven. He said the organization attracted popular support, but had been unable to gain official backing. His film with Richards, Blackout, was premiered at the event Stuck Films at the New Haven Stuckism International Center in 2002. In 2003, he co-organized the Stuckism International Protest Show against the Iraq War, though the theme concentrated not so much on anti-war images as international artistic co-operation with works from the United States, Germany, Brazil and England. One work showed a bust of President George W. Bush with a swastika behind it.

On March 21, 2003, the Stuckists held a "clown trial of President Bush" on the steps of the U.S. District courthouse, Church Street, New Haven. Watson issued a press release for the event, stating that the event was because the double talk of leaders had made clowns out of people, and that a dummy of the President in chains wearing an orange Camp X jumpsuit would be tried by a clown prosecutor, a clown defense and a clown judge. Watson said, "Charges include planning crimes against humanity outside the sanction of international law. Our leader has reduced himself to the same level as those whose terrorist actions he condemns."

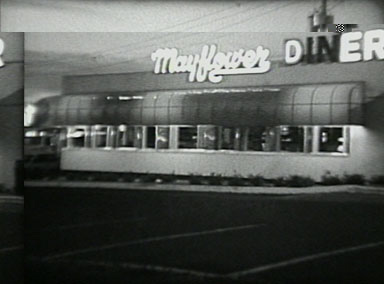
Jesse Richards and Nicholas Watson. Shooting at the Moon. A still from an early Super-8 remodernist film.

He was associated with the Remodernist Film group. His film Shooting at the Moon, co-directed with Stuckist and Remodernist photographer and filmmaker Jesse Richards is one of the first works of Remodernist film. Shooting at the Moon premiered at the New York International Independent Film and Video Festival in November 2003. On March 8, 2008 the film made its London premiere at Horse Hospital during their Flixation Underground Cinema event.

Watson lives and works in Brooklyn, New York. He is the bassist for South Brooklyn Art Rock band Battle of the Camel and a Member of the Glue Stick Collective, a group of artists associated with Clean and Humble Recordings.

== Filmography ==
- Shooting at the Moon 1998 -re-edit- 2003
- "King of the Crown" 1999
- "At the Last Minute" 2000

== See also ==
- Stuckism in the United States
- Remodernist film
- Shooting at the Moon, directed by Jesse Richards & Nicholas Watson
- Jesse Richards
