= Roger K. Burton =

British costume designer (1949–2025)

Roger Kenneth Burton (12 June 1949 – 28 July 2025) was a British creative businessman.

== Life and career ==
In 1978, Burton was approached to provide mod clothing for the 1978 film Quadrophenia. Burton sat on the jury board of BAFTA and was a co-founder of the Fashion in Film Festival.

In 1978 he designed the New Romantic clothing store PX for Stephane Raynor and Helen Robinson. In 1979 he designed Worlds End (formerly punk fashion shop Sex) for Vivienne Westwood and Malcolm McLaren and in 1981 Nostalgia of Mud, also for Westwood and McLaren.

Burton founded The Contemporary Wardrobe Collection in 1978. The collection houses over 20,000 items amassed through Burton’s career. It is used as a resource for fashion and film stylists, designers and museums around the world.

In 2018 Burton published a reference book: Rebel Threads (ISBN 978-1786270948), which features over a thousand examples of rare vintage clothing from the collection. The book traces how distinct streetstyle was originally put together and worn by the predominantly teenage subcultures emerging between the 1940s and 1980s

Burton founded the Horse Hospital in 1992 as a not for profit arts venue, in a Grade II listed building shared with the Contemporary Wardrobe Collection. The Horse Hospital programme has focused on showcasing countercultural histories and outsider or emerging artists. The space opened with Vive Le Punk!, a retrospective of Vivienne Westwood's punk designs in 1993. Subsequently, the venue has hosted a variety of artists and performers including Anita Pallenberg, Alejandro Jodorowsky, Mark Leckey, Lydia Lunch, Tai Shani and others.

On 31 July 2025, The Horse Hospital announced that Burton had died from acute myeloid leukaemia three days earlier, on 28 July, at the age of 76.
