= Remodernism =

Present-day modernist philosophical movement

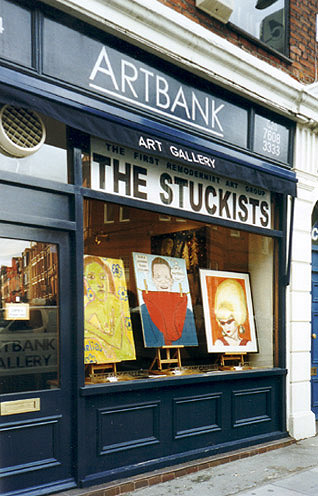
Show, The Stuckists: The First Remodernist Art Group, to launch the book of the same name. London EC1, March 2001.

Remodernism is a stuckist philosophical movement aimed at reviving aspects of modernism, particularly in its early form, in a manner that both follows after and contrasts against postmodernism. The movement was initiated in 2000 by stuckists Billy Childish and Charles Thomson, with a manifesto, Remodernism in an attempt to introduce a period of new "spirituality" into art, culture and society to replace postmodernism, which they said was cynical and spiritually bankrupt. In 2002, a remodernism art show in Albuquerque was accompanied by an essay from University of California, Berkeley art professor, Kevin Radley. Adherents of remodernism advocate it as a forward and radical, not reactionary, impetus.

In 2006, the Stedelijk Museum and the University of Amsterdam held a talk on remodernism with Daniel Birnbaum and Alison Gingeras; the introduction to this talked of the revival of painting as a possible return to traditional modernist values, such as authenticity, self-expression and autonomy, as opposed to multimedia practice. In 2008, London Evening Standard critic, Ben Lewis, applied the term to three Turner Prize nominees and saw them amongst a movement which was reviving the formalism of the early 20th century; he advocated values of an aesthetic informed by modesty, generosity and genuine emotion.

== History ==
=== Origins and 2000 manifesto ===
Charles Thomson and Billy Childish, the founders of the stuckism art movement, inaugurated the period of remodernism. Their Remodernism manifesto was published on March 1, 2000 to promote vision, authenticity and self-expression, with an emphasis on painting, and subtitled "towards a new spirituality in art". Its premise is that the potential of the modernist vision has not been fulfilled, that its development has been in the wrong direction and that this vision needs to be reclaimed, redefined and redeveloped. It advocates the search for truth, knowledge and meaning, and challenges formalism.

It has a short introduction, summing up: "Modernism has progressively lost its way, until finally toppling into the bottomless pit of Postmodern balderdash." This is followed by 14 numbered points, stressing bravery, individuality, inclusiveness, communication, humanity and the perennial against nihilism, scientific materialism and the "brainless destruction of convention." Point 7 states:

Spirituality is the journey of the soul on earth. Its first principle is a declaration of intent to face the truth. Truth is what it is, regardless of what we want it to be. Being a spiritual artist means addressing unflinchingly our projections, good and bad, the attractive and the grotesque, our strengths as well as our delusions, in order to know ourselves and thereby our true relationship with others and our connection to the divine.

Point 9 states: "Spiritual art is not religion. Spirituality is humanity's quest to understand itself and finds its symbology through the clarity and integrity of its artists." Point 12 links its use of the word "God" to enthusiasm—from the Greek root en theos (to be possessed by God).

The summary at the end starts, "It is quite clear to anyone of an uncluttered mental disposition that what is now put forward, quite seriously, as art by the ruling elite, is proof that a seemingly rational development of a body of ideas has gone seriously awry," and finds the solution is a spiritual renaissance because "there is nowhere else for art to go. Stuckism's mandate is to initiate that spiritual renaissance now."

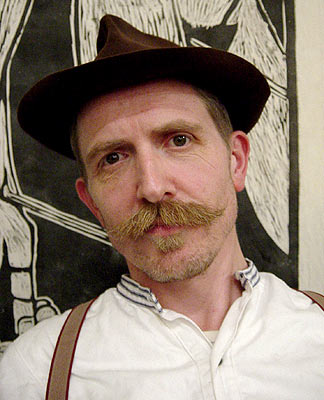
Billy Childish

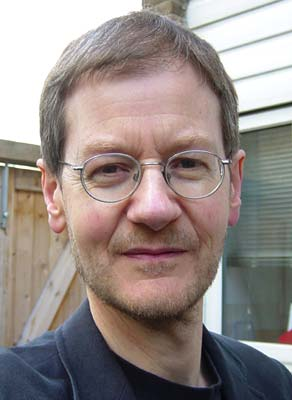
Charles Thomson

In 1999, Childish and Thomson wrote a remodernism manifesto, calling for a period of new spirituality in art, culture and society to replace postmodernism.

Childish and Thomson sent their remodernism manifesto to Sir Nicholas Serota, Director of the Tate Gallery, who replied, "You will not be surprised to learn that I have no comment to make on your letter, or your manifesto Remodernism."

=== Exhibitions (2000–2009) ===
In March 2000 the Stuckists declared themselves to be the first remodernist art group at a show The Resignation of Sir Nicholas Serota. In April, remodernism was quoted in The Gulf News (UAE). In May The Observer newspaper announced a stuckist show: "As the founding group of a self-named art movement called Remodernism, they stand on an art ticket that's against clever conceptualism and in favour of a more emotional and spiritual integrity in art via figurative painting."

In June, Thomson and Childish gave a talk on stuckism and remodernism at the Salon des Arts, Kensington, promoted by the Institute of Ideas. The same month the "Students for Stuckism" also gave "a Remodernist show and talk". The Institute of Remodernism was founded by Khatereh Ahmadi.

In 2001, Thomson stood in the UK general election, stating, "The Stuckist Party aims to bring the ideas of Stuckism and Remodernism into the political arena."

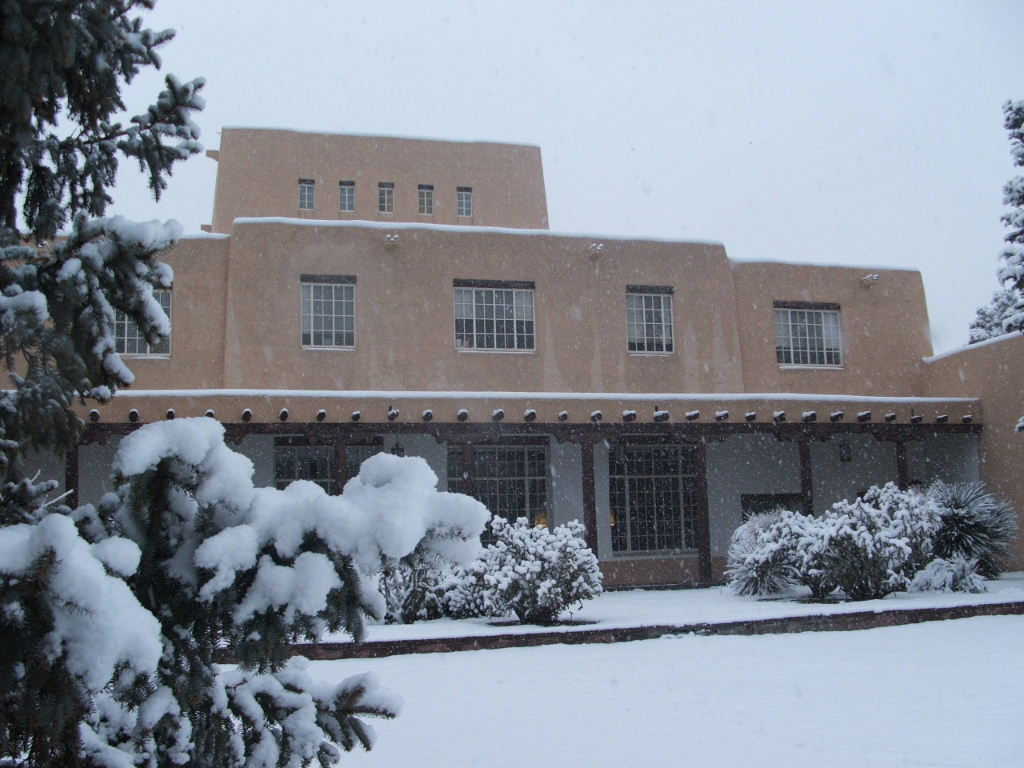
The University of New Mexico: graduates staged a remodernism show.

In January 2002, Magnifico Arts presented the show ReMo: ReModernism of graduate students from the University of New Mexico. At an artists' talk, Kevin Radley, an art professor at the University of California, Berkeley said, "Remodernism isn't about going backwards, but about surging forward." In an essay that accompanied the exhibition, Radley wrote:

...there seems to be a re-emergence of confidence in the artist's singular voice—a renewal of the belief that an artist can explore their own natures without the restraints of the ironic, the cynical or the didactic. To re-contact the notions of presence, reinvent their sense of beauty and renew our need for intimacy.

The show curator, Yoshimi Hayashi, said:

ReMo incorporates ideas from Modernism, Avantegardism, and Post Modernism; thus synthesizing an alternative and real time contemporary approach to art. In ReMo, issues such as multiculturalism, irony, the sublime, and identity are considered; however, they do not become the art itself. The reconsideration and redefinition of the traditions are sought not by mere deconstructionism, but rather by connecting new nodes of ideas. Therefore, by definition, ReMo is fundamentally cellular and its roots stem from provincial art settings.

In 2003, an independent group, the Stuckist Photographers, was founded by Andy Bullock and Larry Dunstan with a statement of endorsement for remodernism.

In 2004, the Defastenists, a new group of creatives in Ireland, declared themselves remodernist. A Remodernist art gallery, The Deatrick Gallery was founded in Louisville, Kentucky. American film makers/photographers Jesse Richards and Harris Smith co-founded a new group remodernist film and photography with an emphasis on emotional meaning and characterised by elements of new-wave, no-wave, expressionist and transcendental film-making.

Stuckist artist Bill Lewis, interviewed by the BBC at the 2004 Liverpool Biennial, said that remodernism was "not a movement as such", but a return to the start of modernism in order to move forward with an art for a new paradigm. To "remodernise" is to go "back to the root again, starting with painting ... and see where it goes". He said that this had been called reactionary, but it was radical "in the true sense of the word". New York stuckist artist, Terry Marks said that remodernism posited that modernism had started in a good direction, but veered from that into "pure idea" and that it was necessary to return to the starting point to take an as-yet unexplored alternative direction: "to pursue art-making that's more concrete and accessible to more people, and find out where that leads us".

In 2004, Luke Heighton wrote in The Future magazine, "Remodernism, it seems, is here to stay whether we like it or not." Alex Kapranos of Franz Ferdinand declared 2004 "a good year for remodernism—for having the gall to suggest that artists can have souls".

In August 2005 an art show Addressing the Shadow and Making Friends with Wild Dogs: Remodernism (a title taken from a line in the stuckist remodernism manifesto) was held at CBGBs 313 gallery in New York City. Artist and blogger Mark Vallen said, "In the mid-1970s punk rock was born in a dank little New York nightclub called CBGB's. It all started when rockers like Television, the Ramones and Patti Smith launched a frontal assault on the monolith of corporate rock 'n roll. Now another artistic revolt, Remodernism, is about to widen its offensive from the birthplace of punk."

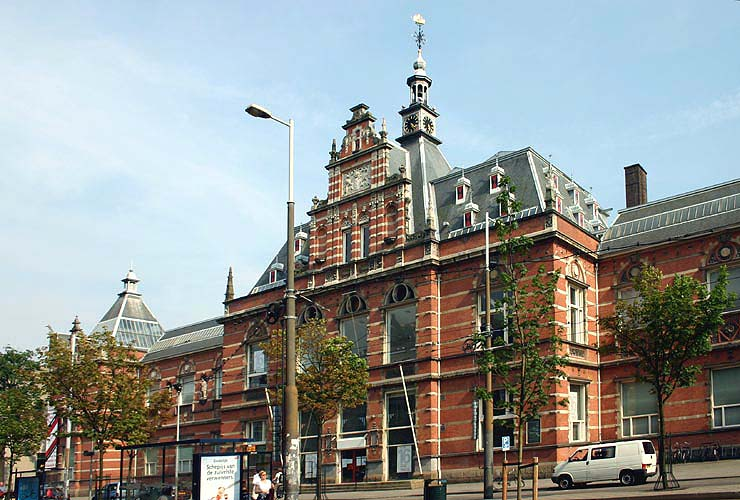
The Stedelijk Museum: in 2006, it staged a talk on remodernism with the University of Amsterdam.

On 10 May 2006, the Stedelijk Museum and the University of Amsterdam staged a talk on remodernism by Daniel Birnbaum, contributing editor of Artforum, and Alison Gingeras, Assistant Curator, Guggenheim Museum. The summary is:

Recently, we have been witness to yet another resurgence of interest in painting. Should we view the revitalization of this ancient medium as a return to traditional modernist values like autonomy, authenticity and self-expression? If indeed we can speak of a return to modernism (remodernism), where will this leave multimedial and transdisciplinary practice in the arts?

In 2006, artist Matt Bray said, "I do not wish to be considered a Stuckist, as I find some of there (sic) antics unnecessary. The Stuckists are however the first and most famous Remodernist group, so for that, and for bringing this particular manifesto to my attention; I thank them." In May 2007, with punk singer Adam Bray, he created the Mad Monk Collective in Folkestone, England, to promote remodernism.

In January 2008, London Evening Standard critic, Ben Lewis, said the year would see "the invention of a new word to describe the modernist revival: 'remodernism,'" which he applied later in the year to Turner Prize nominees Mark Leckey, Runa Islam and Goshka Macuga, as "part of a whole movement reviving early 20th-century formalism", praising Macuga for her "heartfelt, modest and generous-spirited aesthetic", of which he said there was more needed today. In April 2009, he described Catalina Niculescu, a Romanian artist using "nostalgic" 16mm film, as among a significant trend in art of fetishising the offcuts of modernism: "Let's call it Remodernism."

On 27 August 2008, Jesse Richards published a Remodernist Film Manifesto, calling for a "new spirituality in cinema", use of intuition in filmmaking, as well as describing the remodernist film as being a "stripped down, minimal, lyrical, punk kind of filmmaking". The manifesto criticizes Stanley Kubrick, filmmakers who use digital video, and Dogme 95. Point 4 says:

The Japanese ideas of wabi-sabi (the beauty of imperfection) and mono no aware (the awareness of the transience of things and the bittersweet feelings that accompany their passing), have the ability to show the truth of existence, and should always be considered when making the remodernist film.

In 2009, Nick Christos and other students from Florida Atlantic University founded the Miami Stuckists group. Christos said, "Stuckism is a renaissance of modernism—it's re-modernism."

== See also ==
- Remodernist film
- Neomodern
- Post-postmodernism
- Neo-minimalism
- New Sincerity
- New Puritans
- Art manifesto
