= Museum of Soho =

The Museum of Soho
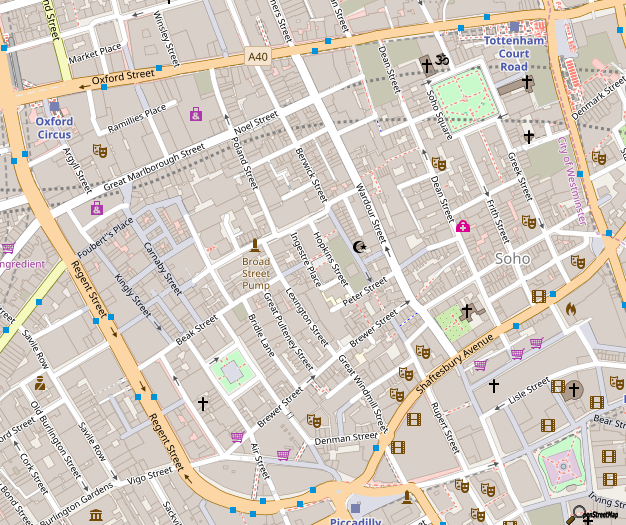
- Location of touchscreen
- Established: 1991
- Location: Soho, London
- Coordinates: 51.510822°N 0.135779°W
- Type: Community museum
- Public transit access: Piccadilly Circus
- Website: Official site

The Museum of Soho is a virtual museum with a physical collection. The museum was started circa 1991. It is an independent, community-based group committed to creating a safe haven for artefacts, documents, etc., relating to Soho, London.

It has a large, interactive touchscreen situated in Sherwood Street (opposite the Piccadilly Theatre) where the public can access galleries, photographs and articles about Soho from the street.

Its main objectives are:

- to create a safe haven for any artefacts, documents, etc. relating to Soho,
- to ensure that these items are recorded professionally,
- to create a database and locations guide for the whole collection, and
- to investigate digital media for future development of the museum.
