= Exploding cinema =

Film collective in London and Amsterdam

Exploding Cinema is both the name for a London-based film collective and the name for regular short film screenings that the collective organises.

== Overview ==
Anybody can screen their film at the Exploding Cinema; the programme is totally open access, on a first come - first shown basis. Between 1992 and 1999, the group put on over 80 events in 21 different venues showcasing around 1300 films by 700 film makers.

Film maker Asif Kapadia profiled Exploding Cinema in a 30-minute program for BBC Radio 4 in 2011.

== History ==
The Exploding Cinema was founded at the Cooltan Arts Centre, a squatted suntan lotion factory in Brixton, South London in 1991. The Cooltan was an underground arts complex with a theatre, gallery, practical workshops and regular raves. The original group was mostly film makers and the earliest shows were made up of their own films and performances.

From the early 1990s onwards, the collective became the key agent in the resurgence of underground cinema in Britain. Through screenings, events, agitation and propaganda they developed and inspired a new popular movement of independent live cinema and D.I.Y. filmmaking. Over twenty five years the group has screened thousands of unfunded no-budget films/videos in pubs, squats, clubs, microcinemas and cafes. They staged one-off shows in disused factories, ships, museums, car parks, roofs, a circus tent and an outdoor swimming pool. Internationally they have staged shows in Ireland, Germany, Belgium, the Netherlands, Malta, North America and Australia.

An offshoot of the group operated in Amsterdam.
