= Morton Bartlett =

American photographer

Morton Bartlett (1909 in Chicago – 1992 in Boston) was an American freelance photographer and graphic designer who, from 1936 to 1963, devoted much of his spare time to creating and photographing a series of intricately carved lifelike plaster dolls. He never formally exhibited his work, though a small circle of friends and acquaintances was aware of its existence. Only upon his death in 1992, when the contents of his estate were purchased by New York art and antiques dealer Marion Harris, did his artistic creations become more widely known to the general public.

After cataloguing all the sculptures and photographs, and publishing FAMILY FOUND - The Lifetime Obsession of Morton Bartlett, Marion Harris exhibited the work, organized exhibits and placed his work in museums including The Metropolitan Museum in New York.

== Life ==
Morton Bartlett was born on 20 January 1909 in Chicago, Illinois and orphaned at the age of 8. He was adopted by Mr. and Mrs. Warren Goddard Bartlett, a wealthy couple from Cohasset, Massachusetts. Morton was enrolled at Phillips Exeter Academy and later spent two years, 1928 to 1930, studying at Harvard University. After dropping out, possibly due to financial hardships brought on by the Great Depression, Bartlett struggled to earn a living. He passed through a succession of jobs, ranging from crafts magazine editor and gas station attendant to making gift cards and running a printing business. Following service in a US Army engineering unit during WWII, Bartlett took up freelance graphic design and photography, designing catalogs for M. Scharf and Co., a Boston-based toy distributor. He never married, though he may have once been engaged to a woman living across the street from him in Cohasset, Mass. where the two ran a business together during the late 1940s.

== Works ==
In 1936, at the age of 27, Bartlett began the personal hobby that would hold his interest for the next 27 years: dollmaking. He had no formal training in sculpture, but by making use of books on anatomy and medical growth charts he was able to create, first in clay and then cast in plaster, at least 15 half-sized likenesses of children (there may have been more but these are the only ones known to remain). Twelve of them are girls, ranging roughly in age from prepubescence to adolescence, and three are boys, of approximately eight years of age and bearing some resemblance to the artist himself. The dolls were made with detachable arms, legs and heads, allowing for a variety of different poses. They are accurately scaled, depicting his compulsive attention to detail. Bartlett took photos of the dolls in lifelike situations, either nude or wearing hand-made clothes.

Bartlett's hobby received public mention twice in his lifetime. The first came in 1957 in the 25th Anniversary Report of Harvard's 1932 graduating class, in which he wrote: "My hobby is sculpting in plaster. Its purpose is that of all proper hobbies - to let out urges that do not find expression in other channels." The second came in April 1962 when Yankee Magazine ran a two-page spread of photographs featuring nine of Bartlett's dolls dressed in costumes representing various ethnic heritages. The article, written by Michael A. Tatischeff, was titled "The Sweethearts of Mr. Bartlett".

Although untrained in art, he worked in sculpture and photography. Bartlett first began to make his dolls in 1936, the same year that Hans Bellmer's book The Doll was published in Paris. Over the following 25 years, Bartlett carved and dressed numerous sculpted dolls (about 15 have survived), and created a photographic record of them which amounts to about 200 B&W photographic prints and 17 colour slides. He was also a collector of anatomy books. The dolls and photographs were found after his death, and have since been shown in books and gallery exhibitions.

Bartlett made the last of his dolls in 1963. Forced to relocate from his Bay Village studio on 15 Fayette Street in Boston that he had occupied for more than a decade, he wrapped his dolls in newspaper and packed them away in custom-made wooden boxes. He moved to Boston's South End where, as far as is known, he never again worked on or photographed any of the dolls in his collection.

Bartlett is widely considered an outsider artist.

== Rediscovery ==
In 1993, New York arts and antiques dealer Marion Harris discovered the dolls for sale at the Pier Show, a New York antiques fair, along with 200 staged B&W photos of the dolls. She purchased the entire collection and later published a catalog of Bartlett's work titled Family Found: The Lifetime Obsession of Morton Bartlett

== Popular culture ==
His dolls inspired Jake and Dinos Chapman (the Zygotic sculptures, circa 1995). In early 2008, one of the dolls sold at auction for $110,000 U.S.

== Bibliography ==
- Harris, Marion (1994). Family Found: The Lifetime Obsession of Morton Bartlett. ISBN 0-9643159-0-4
- Kittelmann, Udo/ Susanne Zander/ Claudia Dichter (1999). Obsession: Morton Bartlett, Eugene Von Bruenchenhein, Henry Darger, Paul Humphrey. ISBN 9783770152698
- Turner, R. and Klochko, D (2004). Create And Be Recognized: Photography On The Edge. Chronicle.
- Kittelmann, Udo and Claudia Dichter (2012). Morton Bartlett. Secret Universe 3. ISBN 978-3-86335-162-5
