= Sleep Has Her House =

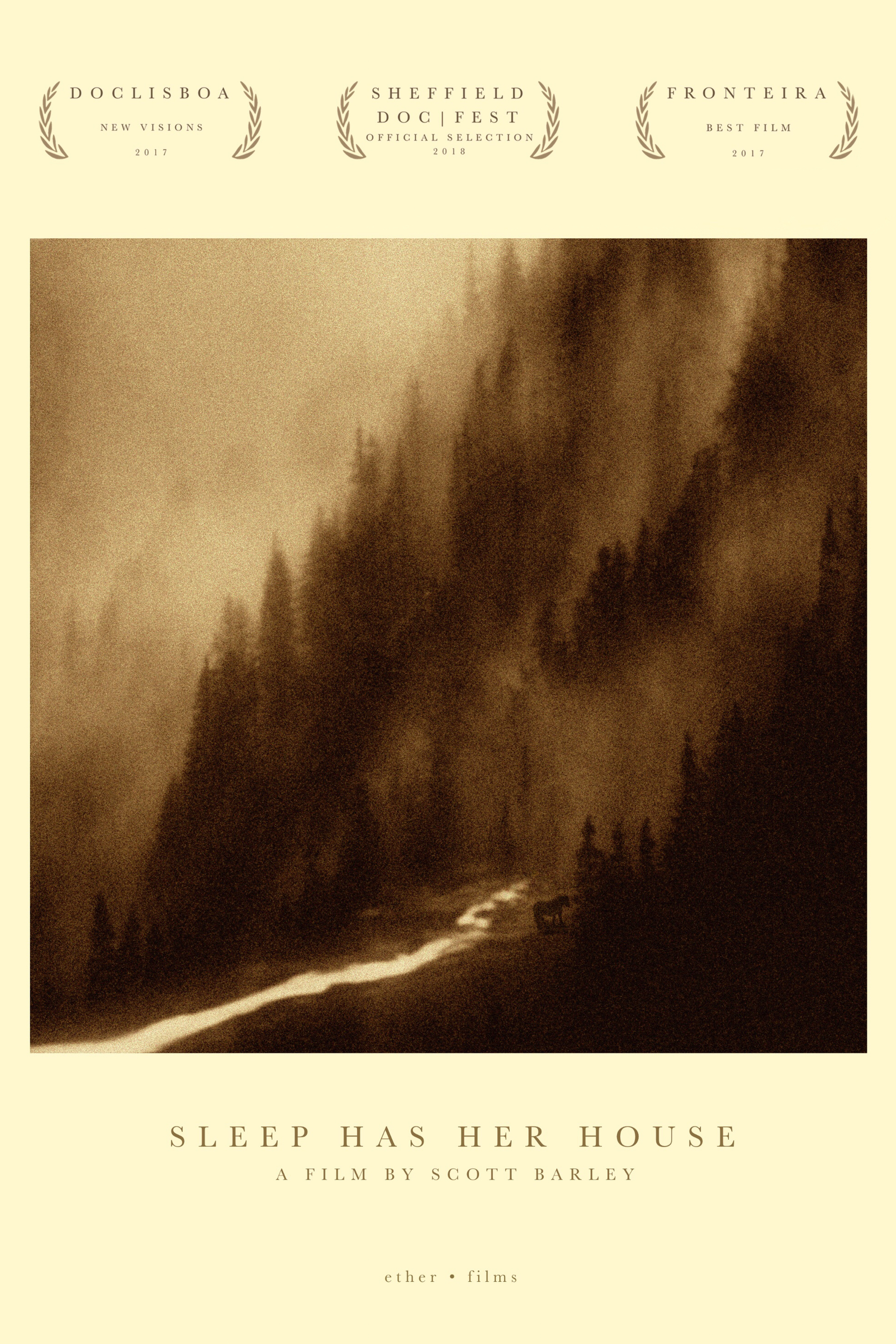
- Film poster
- Directed by: Scott Barley
- Written by: Scott Barley
- Produced by: Scott Barley
- Cinematography: Scott Barley
- Edited by: Scott Barley
- Music by: Scott Barley
- Production company: Ether Films
- Release date: 1 January 2017
- Running time: 90 minutes
- Country: United Kingdom
- Language: English

Sleep Has Her House is a 2017 British experimental film written, directed, produced, scored, and edited by Scott Barley. It features no actors or dialogue.

The film is considered part of the slow cinema movement due to its use of long takes, the longest of which is an 11-minute shot of the sun setting. It was shot on an iPhone 6, continuing Barley's trend of filming with camera phones. It also features still photography and hand-drawn images by Barley.

== Premise ==
In a world seemingly devoid of humans and inhabited by only a select few animals, an undefined presence manifests, embodied as the wind. It passes through the valley, lake, and woods, leaving only mysterious deaths in its wake. As the night creeps in, the supernatural forces at work transcend into the natural, with apocalyptic consequences.

== Production ==
Sleep Has Her House was created solely by Barley and shot on an iPhone 6, with filming taking place throughout 2015 and 2016 in Scotland and Barley's native Wales. Editing happened concurrently with filming, which took 16 months. Some of the sequences in the film consist of up to 60 separate shots stitched together as one in post-production, which sometimes took months to render. The film was completed in December 2016.

== Release ==
Sleep Has Her House premiered on 1 January 2017 with the launch of streaming service Tao Films. In April, the film launched on the online VOD platform Kinoscope.

In 2018, Barley became the sole distributor and owner of the film, and made it available to purchase as an HD download on his website.

A limited edition Blu-ray accompanied by a book of essays on the film was released on 20 April 2021. The Blu-ray included two short films, Hinterlands and Womb, which were shot and edited during the same period. The book included essays by Barley as well as film directors and academics from Europe, America, Asia, and Australia, with a foreword by cultural historian Nicole Brenez. It sold out in less than 24 hours.

A revised and remastered version of the film was released in 2023.

== Reception ==
=== Critical response ===
Despite targeting an extremely niche audience, the film received acclaim. In early 2017, it was named the "best overlooked film" by film critic Dustin Chang in an IndieWire critic's poll, although this was before its official release. James Slaymaker of Mubi Notebook wrote: "Like the great Jean-Marie Straub, Scott Barley creates striking images by returning us to the basics of cinema, the natural world, but abstracting it through profilmic means by reducing the landscape to pure, basic forms [...] If Sleep Has Her House at first calls to mind the expressionist landscapes of Peter Hutton, Victor Sjöström, and Jean-Marie Straub, the formal apocalypse of its final act recalls the smeary digital cacophony of Lucien Castaing-Taylor and Véréna Paravel's Leviathan. By removing his filmmaking from any traditional sense of narrative, character, and, even temporal/spatial unity, Barley invites us to see the world—and the cinematic image—anew. Sleep Has Her House is a vital reminder that the most potent visual abstractions can be created through something as simple as the shifting colour of the sky reflected in water, and the most jarring shock can come from a change in lens." Upon watching the film, American novelist, Dennis Cooper wrote: "I realised how very long it had been since a new film both filled me with absolute wonder and satisfied my deepest cravings for cinema itself. It made me ask myself, 'Where am I?' in the most precise and hopeful way." For the Canadian premiere, film critic, Josh Cabrita wrote in The Georgia Straight: "Barley has more in common with Caspar David Friedrich than any contemporary avant-gardist, finding the terrible sublime through grand footage shot on nothing less than an iPhone."

Influential American experimental filmmaker Phil Solomon wrote of the film: "There are moments within Sleep Has Her House of such exquisite and subtle rendering of ‘moving light in place’ that I have always dreamed of experiencing in the cinema. A black forest film to be entered into only with great care and caution [...] Scott Barley has dared us to imagine a cinema of such fragile - and terrifying - beauty (reclaiming once again that real definition of 'awesome', the sublime) that places both the film and the viewer on equal footing of corporal existence by the closing credits."

The film was later nominated in Sight & Sound's best films of 2017 poll. In casting his vote, writer and film critic, Tom Charity described the film as, "The single most momentous hour and a half in the dark this year, a tenebrous landscape film shapeshifting between reality and nightmare, cinema and dream."

In early 2018, Sleep Has Her House was nominated for best film, best first feature, and best director in The Village Voice 2017 Film Poll.

In 2020, film historian, Nicole Brenez cited Sleep Has Her House as one of the best films of the decade.

=== Accolades ===
Sleep Has Her House was awarded Best Film by the official jury at the Fronteira International Documentary & Experimental Film Festival in Goiânia, Brazil.

In 2022, the film received two votes as one of the ten greatest films of all time in the Sight and Sound's decennial world poll, receiving votes in both the critics’ and director’s polls.

In 2024, Sleep Has Her House was in fourth place in Far Out's list of the ten greatest movies shot on a mobile phone.

=== Legacy ===
Sleep Has Her House has since become a cult film. Notable artists have praised the film, including film director Robert Eggers, novelist Dennis Cooper, and Jamie Stewart of Xiu Xiu. Musician Ethel Cain said the film "changed [her] life" and cited it as a key influence on her studio recording, Perverts.

== See also ==
- List of films shot on mobile phones
- List of films with high frame rates
