= Jesse Richards =

American painter

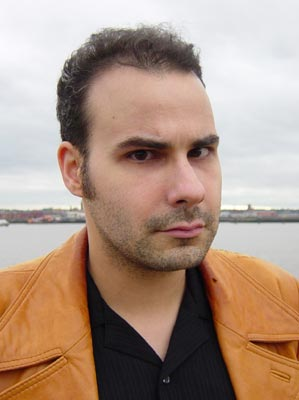
- Jesse Richards
- Born: Jesse Beau Richards; July 17, 1975 (age 51); New Haven, Connecticut, U.S.
- Education: The School of Visual Arts, University of Massachusetts Amherst
- Known for: Painting, Photography, Cinema
- Notable work: Night Life, Shooting at the Moon
- Movement: Stuckism (2001–2006), Remodernist film

Jesse Beau Richards (born July 17, 1975) is a painter, filmmaker and photographer from New Haven, Connecticut and was affiliated with the international movement Stuckism. He has been described as "one of the most provocative names in American underground culture," and "the father of remodernist cinema."

== Early life ==
Jesse Richards was born in New Haven. He had an ambition to be a forest ranger during his teens, which was also the time he started to make films. He studied film production at the School of Visual Arts, New York City, which he left after a nervous breakdown. He directed plays including Hamlet and Look Back In Anger for the New Haven Theatre Company, and made short romance and punk films.

In 1999, Richards was arrested for reckless burning, destruction of property and disorderly conduct. After the charges were dropped, he began painting.

== Stuckism ==
Richards is affiliated with the Stuckist art movement in 2001 and founded a gallery as the first Stuckism center in the United States in 2002, helping to organize shows. The center opened its doors with a show entitled "We Just Wanna Show Some Fucking Paintings."

In 2003, an anti-war "Clown Trial of President Bush" took place outside the New Haven Federal Courthouse, in order to "highlight the fact that the Iraq War does not have the support of the United Nations, thus violating a binding contract with the UN". It was staged by local Stuckist artists dressed in clown costume, led by Richards with Nicholas Watson and Tony Juliano. One of the participants was a public defender for the state of Connecticut.

Simultaneously the Stuckism center opened a War on Bush show, including work from Brazil, Australia, Germany and the UK, while the London equivalent staged a War on Blair show. Richards said the original intention of a straightforward art show to an anti-war show had been changed after a phone discussion with Stuckism founder, Charles Thomson. Richards told The Yale Herald, "Duchamp would go over to the Yale University Art Gallery and he would say, 'This is crap,' and he would go paint a picture."

Jesse Richards. Nightlife shown at The Stuckists Punk Victorian, 2004

Also in 2003, Richards was an exhibitor in the UK show, Stuck in Wednesbury at Wednesbury Museum & Art Gallery, the first Stuckist show in a public gallery, and in The Stuckists Summer Show at the Stuckism International Gallery, London.

In 2004, Richards was one of eight artists in the "International Stuckists" section of The Stuckists Punk Victorian show at the Walker Art Gallery during the Liverpool Biennial. He said of his exhibited work, Nightlife: "This came out of heavy drinking and loneliness. New Haven's social scene is entirely going to bars, so it was my only way to meet new people."

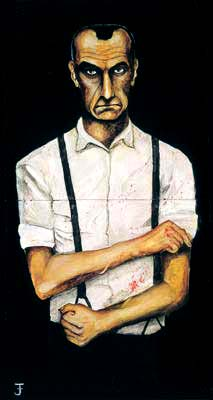
Joe Machine. My Grandfather Will Fight You. Praised by Richards.

Richards reviewed the Biennial and the Stuckist show, where he found Joe Machine's My Grandfather Will Fight You, "one of the best Stuckist paintings. Machine's work is the epitome of raw, real expressive painting." He said that Stuckist Photographer Andy Bullock's work was "silly installation photography" which was "trying to be trendy."

In 2005, 160 paintings from the Walker Art Gallery show, including one by Richards, were offered as a donation to the Tate gallery, but rejected by Sir Nicholas Serota, because "We do not feel that the work is of sufficient quality in terms of accomplishment, innovation or originality of thought to warrant preservation in perpetuity in the national collection".

In 2005, Richards was a co-ordinator of, and participated in, Addressing the Shadow and Making Friends with Wild Dogs: Remodernism, the first Remodernism exhibition in the US to include work from all of the Remodernist groups, including the Stuckists, the Defastenists, Remodernist Film and Photography, and Stuckism Photography. The show took place at the CBGB 313 gallery.

In 2006, Richards was one of the artists in The Triumph of Stuckism, a show at Liverpool John Moores University Hope Street Gallery, curated by Naive John at the invitation of Professor Colin Fallows, Chair of Research at Liverpool School of Art and Design, and part of the Liverpool Biennial 2006.

Richards left the Stuckist movement in 2006.

== Shows ==
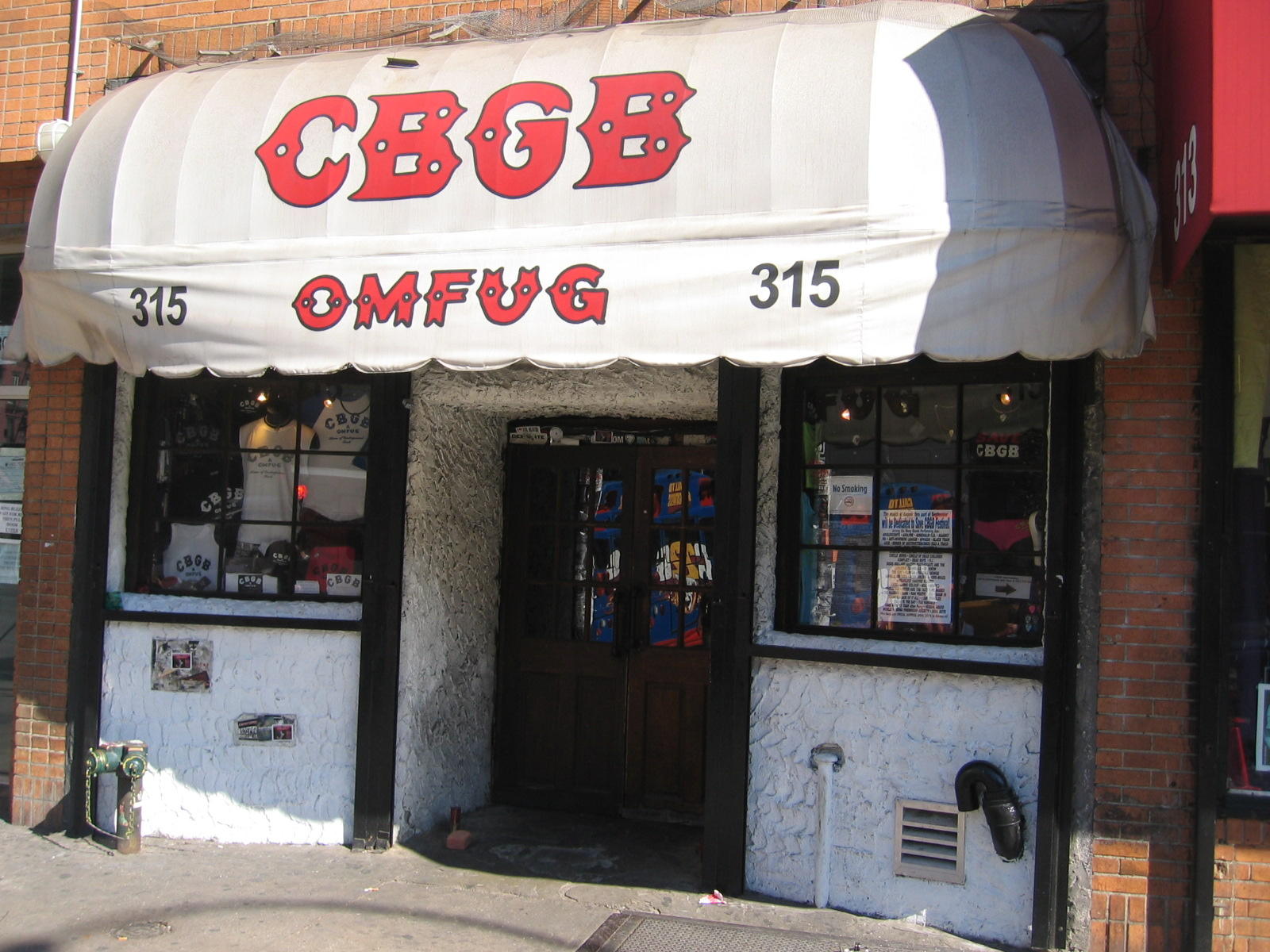
CBGB, New York: Richards co-organized the show Addressing the Shadow and Making Friends with Wild Dogs: Remodernism in its gallery.

Stuckist group shows organized or featuring work by Richards include:

- 2002 We Just Wanna Show Some Fucking Paintings – New Haven
- 2003 War on Bush – New Haven
- 2003 Stuck in Wednesbury – Wednesbury
- 2003 The Stuckists Summer Show – London
- 2004 The Stuckists Punk Victorian – Liverpool Biennial
- 2004 The Stuckists Punk Victorian In the Toilet – New Haven
- 2005 Addressing the Shadow and Making Friends with Wild Dogs: Remodernism – New York City
- 2006 The Triumph of Stuckism – Liverpool Biennial

== Film, photography and other work ==
Richards has worked on films with Nicholas Watson since 1996. Their film noir, Blackout, was premiered at the event Stuck Films at the New Haven Stuckism International Center in 2002.

In 2003, Richards co-produced Shooting at the Moon, a short film premiering at the New York International Independent Film and Video Festival. In 2008, the film made its London premiere at Horse Hospital during its FLIXATION Underground Cinema Club event. Richards said that his films had previously often contained nudity, but this time he wanted to do the opposite and the two leads do not quite even kiss:

While making this film I guess the main thing we were thinking about accomplishing was to express this emotional experience, and have people really feel it, and not to get too complicated with story or anything that would distract from this feeling we wanted people to have while watching the film.

A book of pinhole photography called "Dark Chamber", featuring new work by Richards as well as work by Wolf Howard, Billy Childish and others was published by Urban Fox Press in May 2007.

Brian Sherwin said of Richards that his work was "Street truth":

His work may seem crude to some, but at least it is honest (sometimes brutally honest.) This honesty is captured by his ability to convey human behavior and struggles with each shot from his camera.

In February 2010, the Australian film magazine Filmink announced Richards' participation in a compilation feature film by the Remodernist film movement. The film is scheduled to premiere in New York in December 2010.

In December 2010, Richards joined the Board of Directors of Cine Foundation International.

In 2026 Richards created a visual novel adaptation of Bruges-la-Morte as The Dead City using Twine.

Richards currently lives in Montague, Massachusetts and New Haven, Connecticut.

=== Remodernist film movement ===
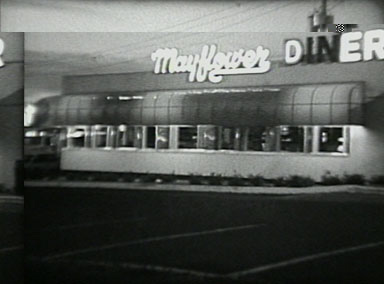
Jesse Richards and Nicholas Watson. Shooting at the Moon. A still from an early Super-8 Remodernist film.

In 2004, Richards and fellow filmmaker Harris Smith co-founded Remodernist Film and Photography, a new Remodernist group attempting to introduce Remodernist/Stuckist values into film and photography.

In 2008, Richards published a Remodernist Film Manifesto, calling for a "new spirituality in cinema" and the use of intuition in filmmaking. He described Remodernist film as a "stripped down, minimal, lyrical, punk kind of filmmaking",. Point four of the manifesto is:

The Japanese ideas of wabi-sabi (the beauty of imperfection) and mono no aware (the awareness of the transience of things and the bittersweet feelings that accompany their passing), have the ability to show the truth of existence, and should always be considered when making the remodernist film.

There were also criticisms of Stanley Kubrick, digital video, and Dogme 95.

In late August 2009, an International Alliance of Remodernist Filmmakers was started by Richards in order to promote discussion and collaboration amongst those following the manifesto. The filmmakers include Jesse Richards, Harris Smith, Christopher Michael Beer, Dmitri Trakovsky, Kate Shults, Peter Rinaldi and Khurrem Gold of America, Roy Rezaali of the Netherlands, Rouzbeh Rashidi of Iran and Dean Kavanagh of Ireland.

In October 2009, with the intention "to further develop and explain Remodernist film concepts", a series of articles by Richards, Peter Rinaldi and Roy Rezaali were published in the magazine MungBeing In Richards' two essays in the magazine, he explains the development of cinema in terms of modernism, postmodernism and remodernism, and discusses remodernist film craft as involving filmmakers "teaching themselves to paint pictures, to try acting in their own movies and those of others (especially if they are shy), to be nude models for other artists, to meditate, worship if they are religious, to do things that affect their levels of consciousness, try things that make them nervous or uncomfortable, to go out and be involved in life, to find adventure, to jump in the ocean. I think that is the exploration of craft". He also relaxes the criticisms made in the manifesto about digital video, claiming that can "have a place in Remodernist cinema", but with a "new language" and not in the way it is used now, which he says is to "mimic film".

He describes his specific approach to Remodernist filmmaking as well:

... my own interests are a little more specific. I'm interested in Japanese aesthetics, Tarkovsky's ideas on "sculpting in time", an emphasis on moments. But there's something else I've really been thinking about lately. I believe that the most effective way to really make subjective and authentic work involves an "addressing of the shadow" (as Billy Childish and Charles Thomson have described it). Now what does this mean exactly? It might mean that you are really obsessed with pubic hair, or maybe you are really embarrassed by a physical or mental disability that you try to hide, or like Billy Childish, you were abused as a child. These things, these "shadows" that we are hiding within ourselves, need to be brought forth into the light of day – in our films, in our work, in our poetry. It's necessary for us to share these parts of ourselves so we and the people we share with can grow into complete, honest human beings. Now, this kind of brutal honesty about ourselves shown through imagery that isn't shy, has been explored to a degree in the work from the Cinema of Transgression, and is advocated by Antonin Artaud in his writings about the Theatre of Cruelty, and his later writings on cinema. But I don't think it's quite as simple as just that. As human beings, we are also full of beauty and love and poetry – we can see this in ourselves and in others and in the world around us. So this beauty must be explored as well, and in combination with the exploration of the shadow. The funny thing is that if we would just be honest as filmmakers, or painters, or as whatever we happen to work with, if we could be this honest, this approach would happen automatically. But we are told again and again- these things don't go together, don't tell people about that thing that you can't get out of your head- that image is inappropriate. We've become very afraid of just expressing ourselves honestly, of removing the desperate attempts to appear clever, we've been afraid of showing our true selves out of fear that others will think us fools. So this is where Artaud, the Cinema of Transgression, and even Andrei Tarkovsky have not gone quite the distance. The cinematic exploration of spirituality and transgression together – pubic hair, blood and shit and love and the green grass and the dying cherry blossoms, falling snow, passing trains – every single fucking beautiful piece of life – that is what my conception of Remodernist film is.

The articles also broaden the aim of the movement, explaining the common bond among Remodernist filmmakers being a search for truth, knowledge, authenticity and spirituality in their work, but having different approaches on achieving that goal.

== Filmography ==
- Frank's Wild Years, 1994/1995
- I Wonder, 1996
- Sex and Lies, 1998 (destroyed except for trailer)
- Blackout, 2000
- Shooting at the Moon, 1998. Re-edit 2003
- Yugen, 2009
- Wonder about Patterns in Your Head, 2009
- So Tell me Again, 2009
- Nothing: December 2, 2009, 2009
- Orphans, 2009

== See also ==
- Remodernist Film
- Stuckism in America
- Stuckist demonstrations
- Pinhole Photography
