= Meridian (film) =

- Directed by: Curtis Clark
- Screenplay by: Justin Haythe
- Story by: Curtis Clark; James Harmon Brown
- Produced by: Malcolm Duncan
- Starring: Kevin Kilner; Reid Scott; Elyse Levesque
- Edited by: David Sconyers
- Music by: Alex Kovacs
- Production companies: Virgin Soil Pictures; Netflix
- Distributed by: Netflix
- Release date: 2016
- Running time: 12 minutes
- Country: United States
- Language: English

Meridian is a 2016 film noir thriller film directed by Curtis Clark and written by Clark and James Harmon Brown. The film stars Kevin Kilner, Reid Scott, and Elyse Levesque, and focuses on detectives investigating the disappearances of three men in 1940s Los Angeles. It was released on Netflix and Xiph.org in September 2016.

While Meridian was given an official release, the film serves primarily as testing material for video codecs and 4K streaming quality. The film incorporates material that is difficult to stream, such as smoke, rain and harsh lighting. It was released under a Creative Commons license so that other streaming services and technology reviewers may use it for their own tests.

== Plot ==
In 1947 Los Angeles, veteran detective Mac Foster (Kevin Kilner) talks with his younger partner Jake Sullivan (Reid Scott) about the disappearance of three men near a rock overlooking a beach. Mac explains that the three had no connection to one another, except that they were all divorced. He also mentions there was a witness to the last disappearance who described supernatural goings-on.

At Mac's behest, Jake drives to the scene. On the way, it begins to rain. Through his rearview mirror, he notices a woman (Elyse Levesque) sitting in his back seat; When he turns to look, the seat is empty. Later, Mac finds Jake's car, abandoned, near the rock, and a storm rapidly rolls in. Mac wanders from the car and across the beach, entering a large cave.

Inside the cave is a ventriloquist's dummy, a clock whose numbers appear to rotate, a stained-glass window, and footage of Mac himself projected onto the wall. He then comes across the three missing men, as well as Jake, frozen still. The woman appears again, behind Mac, as the film ends.

== Cast ==
- Kevin Kilner as Captain Mac Foster
- Reid Scott as Detective Jake Sullivan
- Elyse Levesque as the woman
- Joseph Butler as missing man 1
- Mike Deadman as missing man 2
- James Brown as missing man 3

== Production ==
Meridian was developed as test footage for use by video streaming services. It makes deliberate use of an extreme range of lights and shadows, as well as cigar smoke and water, in order to make the film difficult to effectively encode for streaming. In one scene, the sky changes from bright sun to dark and overcast, interfering with the light balance; this is a common cause of color banding in video streaming. The film is shot in the high frame rate of 60 frames per second, making use of 4K resolution, and has a peak brightness level of 4000 candelas per square meter.

Meridian was designed as a test film for the Interoperable Master Format (IMF), an open-source standard developed by the Society of Motion Picture and Television Engineers. The format encodes video with instructions specific to regions, such as which audio files to use or when to censor content. It was released under a Creative Commons Attribution-NonCommercial-NoDerivatives 4.0 International license.
