= Newtown Radio =

American Internet radio station

- Bushwick, Brooklyn, New York; United States

Programming
- Format: Free-form radio

History
- Founded: 2009

Links
- Website: newtownradio.com

Newtown Radio is a free-form internet radio station with a studio in Bushwick, Brooklyn, New York. It was founded in 2009 by Mark Brinda, Tariq Abdus-Sabur and Colin Ilgen in a former brewery It features around the clock programming by blogs, artists, and labels.

Several Newtown programs have attracted media attention, including: WTBS, I Have Always Found You Extremely Attractive, Disco Juice, Cock Talk, and' Level Radio.

Notable artists who have appeared on Newtown include: Laurel Halo, Beach Fossils, The Pains of Being Pure at Heart, Connan Mockasin, Mac DeMarco, Jacuzzi Boys, Chelsea Wolfe, Perfect Pussy, Mood Rings, and Professor Genius.

== Showcases ==
In 2011, Newtown's Northside festival showcase at Shea Stadium BK in Bushwick with Laurel Halo, Autre Ne Veut, and Steve Summers was reviewed positively in The New York Times by Jon Caramanica.

In 2015, in conjunction with PopRally, the planning committee at The Museum of Modern Art (MoMA), Newtown co-curated four summer concerts in the MoMA Sculpture Garden, featuring: Galcher Lustwerk and DJ Willy Burns, Lower Dens and DJ Stadiums & Shrines, Regal Degal and DJ Michael McGregor, Tei Shi and DJ Lomé.

== Video ==
Newtown has also produced video sessions of rising indie artists published through Noisey/VICE.
