= Scott Barley =

Welsh film director, artist, musician, writer

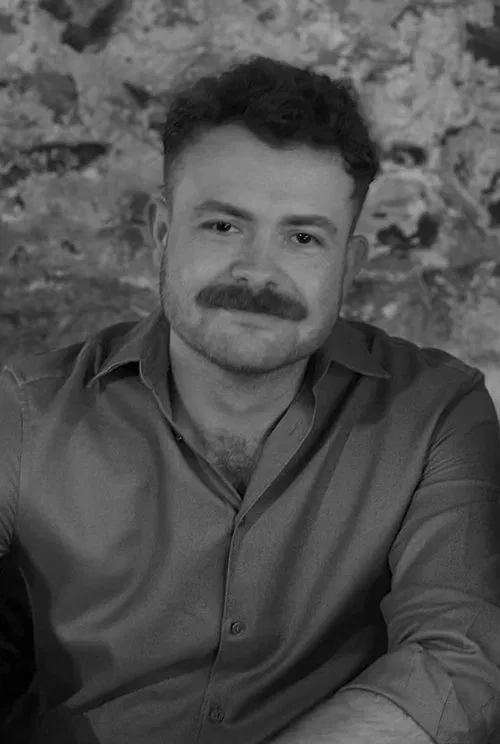
- Barley in 2024
- Born: Cardiff, Wales
- Education: Kingston University; University of South Wales; Cardiff Metropolitan University
- Known for: Cinema
- Notable work: Sleep Has Her House Hinterlands
- Movement: Slow cinema; experimental film; remodernist film
- Occupations: Film director; artist; musician; writer
- Website: scottbarley.com

Scott Barley (born 11 November 1992) is a Welsh filmmaker, artist, drone musician, and writer.

His work often focuses on creating mood and sensory experiences rather than following traditional narrative structures. His films have been associated with the remodernist and slow cinema movements, and ecocriticism. Recurrent themes in his work are the anthropocene, nature, darkness, absence, cosmology, phenomenology, mereology and mysticism.

His filmmaking methods have been compared to David Lynch, Stan Brakhage, Philippe Grandrieux, Béla Tarr, Alexander Sokurov, Maya Deren and Jean Epstein.

Since early 2015, Barley has almost exclusively shot his films on iPhone, working primarily alone. While his filmmaking is largely solitary, he has also contributed to the work of other filmmakers, most notably Ildikó Enyedi's 2025 film, Silent Friend.

He is most well-known for the 2017 experimental film, Sleep Has Her House. Danish film critic, and former director of the European Documentary Network, Tue Steen Müller has described him as the "Anselm Kiefer of cinema".

== Influences and style ==
Barley has cited Béla Tarr, Robert Bresson, Michelangelo Antonioni, Pedro Costa, Phil Solomon, Jean-Claude Rousseau, and Nathaniel Dorsky among his favourite filmmakers.

Barley's imagery and focus on natural landscape has been likened to the romantic tradition of The Sublime within a modernist and digital context. Critics and academics have drawn parallels with Sleep Has Her House and the work of Caspar David Friedrich, J. M. W. Turner, Johann Wolfgang von Goethe, Wagner's Götterdämmerung and the ideas of Immanuel Kant, among others.

Barley's approach to filmmaking is similar to that of other solo and poetic avant-garde filmmakers, Stan Brakhage, Jonas Mekas, Nathaniel Dorsky and Peter Hutton, but the post-production process is unique to both mainstream and avant-garde filmmaking practices.

"I always begin a film almost like one would keep a diary. I have no idea, or agenda to make a film. I simply document. I shoot what attracts me, random things, animals, variances in light, the water, the stars; simply what draws me in on different days, different nights, in different places. Once I have built up a body of footage, I start to see connections. These pieces of footage could be taken months or even years apart – and miles apart too. [I] then invisibly stitch [the different shots] together into one larger shot or sequence. But these connections between different pieces of footage all happen organically. I never force these connections. I never force a film when it doesn’t come. The films find me – not the other way round [...] All my films have been made this way. Some happen quicker than others. Once these connections are established, a narrative - through images - begins to germinate."

== Filmography ==
Year	Title	Running time	Notes
TBC	The Sea Behind Her Head	TBC	(in production)
TBC	Within Without Horizon	TBC	(in production)
TBC	The Flesh	TBC	(in production)
2025	A Ladder	9 min	with Hara Alonso
2020	Half Moon	4 minutes	
2017	Eviscerations	12 min	screened only once; unreleased
2017	Womb	17 min	
2017	Passing	2 min	
2017	Fugue	-	unreleased
2017	The Green Ray	12 min	
2017	Sleep Has Her House	90 min	First feature
2016	Painting (I)	360 min	Installation; unreleased
2016	Hinterlands	7 min	
2016	Closer	7 min	
2015	Blue Permanence / Swan Blood	6 min	
2015	Hunter	14 min	
2015	The Sadness of the Trees	12 min	with Mikel Guillen
2015	Shadows	20 min	
2015	Evenfall	6 min	
2015	Death Is a Photograph	-	unreleased
2015	Hours	3 min	
2014	Ille Lacrimas	20 min	
2014	Polytechnique	12 min	
2013	Nightwalk	6 min	
2013	Irresolute	2 min	
2013	Retirement	3 min	
2013	GLASS / TRUTH	4 min	
2012	The Ethereal Melancholy of Seeing Horses in the Cold	4 min	
2012	Untitled	3 min	Installation with video

== Music ==
Title	Format	Year
Awaiting Body	Album	2021
To the Lighthouse	Single	2017
Sleep Has Her House (Original Motion Picture Soundtrack)	Soundtrack	2017, 2021
