= Horse Hospital =

Grade listed building in London

The Horse Hospital
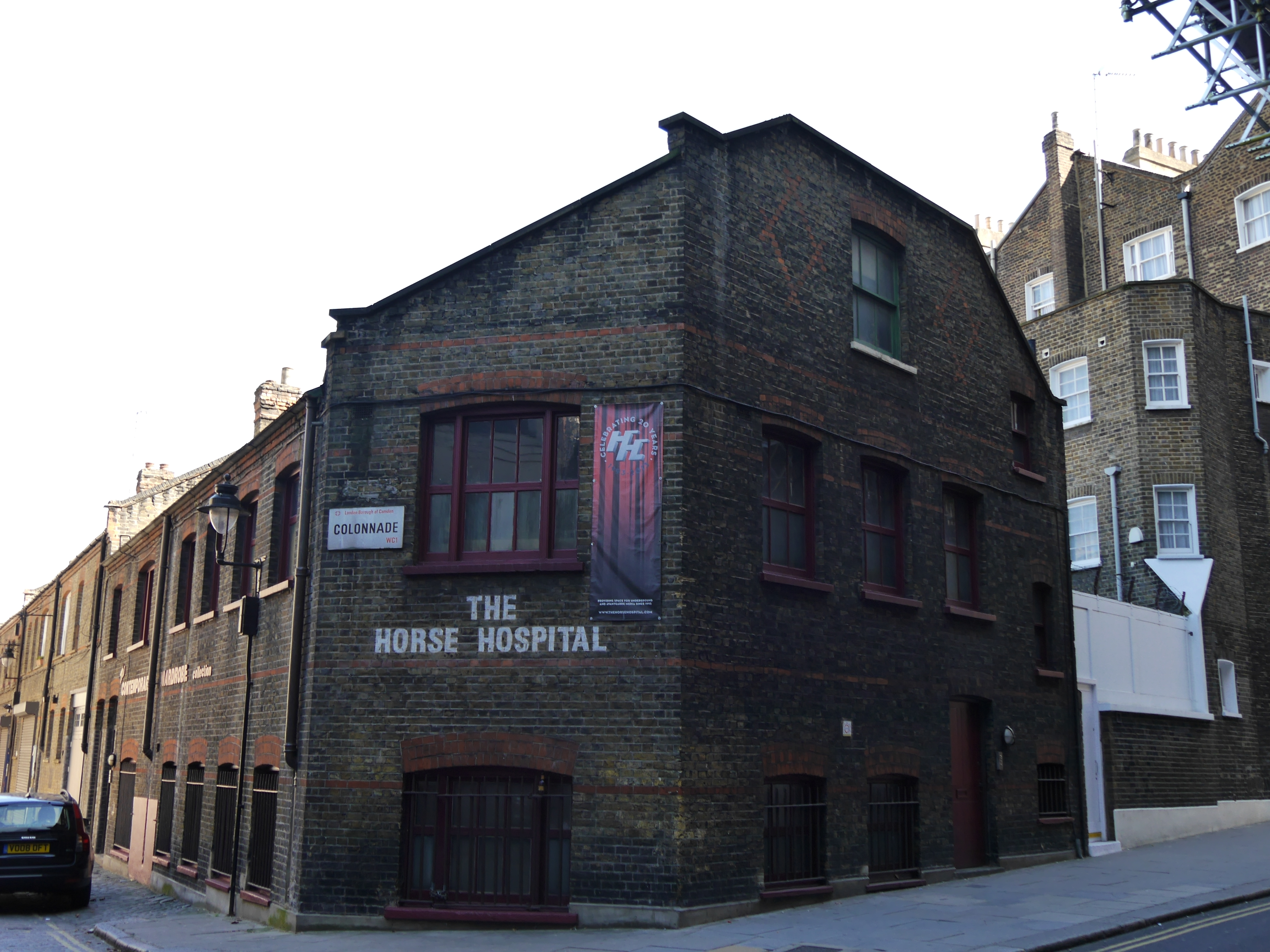
- The Horse Hospital, 2016

- Location within Greater London

General information
- Location: Colonnade, Bloomsbury, London WC1N 1JD, England, United Kingdom
- Coordinates: 51.5228°N 0.1244°W
- Construction started: 1794
- Completed: 1797

Design and construction
- Architect: James Burton

Website
- www.thehorsehospital.com

The Horse Hospital is a Grade II listed not for profit, independent arts venue at Colonnade, Bloomsbury, central London. Its curatorial focus is on counter-cultural histories, sub-cultures, outsiders and emerging artists. It organizes underground film screenings and exhibitions. Founded in 1992 by Roger K. Burton, the venue opened with Vive Le Punk!, a retrospective of Vivienne Westwood's punk designs in 1993.

The building was originally built by James Burton in 1797 as stabling for cab drivers' sick horses.

== History ==
Initially programmed by Burton and Ian White, the venue's reputation grew both in London and abroad. James B. L. Hollands later replaced White as curator. The artist, Tai Shani was the programmer from 2006 to 2016, followed by Sholto Dobie and Letitia Calin. George Lynch and Alexia Marmara have been curators and programmers since 2022.

In 1998, the Horse Hospital hosted the debut British exhibition by outsider artist / painter Joe Coleman which attracted a new audience. Subsequently, the venue played host to a variety of performers, musicians, artists, film makers and writers, including Dame Darcy, Anita Pallenberg, Iain Aitch, Jack Sargeant, Valie Export, Chris Carter, David Tibet, Helen Chadwick, Dennis Cooper, Nan Goldin, Morton Bartlett, Lydia Lunch, Bruce Bickford, Gee Vaucher and Crass, Alejandro Jodorowsky, Stewart Home, Jeremy Reed, Franko B, Ron Athey, Banksy, Marc Almond, Yvonne Rainer, Artūras Barysas and others.

It has also been used by various record labels, publishing houses including Soft Skull Press, Verso, Serpent's Tail and Clear Cut Press. and journals such as Strange Attractor and Granta for special events, as well as a screening space for numerous film festivals including the Fashion in Film Festival, London International Animation Festival, London Porn Film Festival amongst others.

The Horse Hospital houses and is supported by the Contemporary Wardrobe Collection, a fashion archive that specialises in post-war street fashion, sub-cultures and British design. The Chamber of Pop Culture is located there. Proud Camden has been located there since about 2008.

In 2015 The Horse Hospital was listed with London Borough of Camden as a Community Asset and the site was selected for inclusion in the British Library’s UK Web Archive as a website of cultural importance.

In 2019 it was announced that The Horse Hospital was at risk of closure after its landlord proposed a 333 per cent rent increase, from £30,000 to £130,000 annually from the beginning of 2020. At the start of January 2020 it secured an extension on its lease until 28 February. Eventually, according to The Horse Hospital's website, a new lease was secured until December 2024, with a rent increase of 33%.

== Building ==
The building is Grade II listed. It was originally built by James Burton in 1797 as stabling for cab drivers' sick horses, the Horse Hospital is notable for its unique stone tiled floor. Access to both floors is by concrete moulded ramps, the upper floor ramp retains hardwood slats preventing the horses from slipping. It can be found at Colonnade, Bloomsbury, London.

== Major exhibitions ==
- 1993 Vive Le Punk!, Vivienne Westwood and Malcolm McLaren
- 1998 Original Sin, Joe Coleman
- 1998 Remote Control, Laurie Lipton
- 1998 Meet, Brian Griffin
- 1999 Car, Photographs by Peter Anderson
- 1999 Andre the Giant Has a Posse by Shepard Fairey
- 2000 Oh Lover Boy, Franko B
- 2000 The Situation At This Address Has Changed, Sculpture, Drawing, Painting Harry Forbes
- 2000 Transromantik, Cathy Ward and Eric Wright
- 2001 Two Es And A Viagra, Peter Rigby
- 2001 Beat 13!, Lucy McLauchlan, Tim Watkins, Al Murphy
- 2001 Gee Vaucher
- 2001 Hospital Brut, The Toxic art of Le Dernier Cri
- 2002 David Tibet and Steven Stapleton
- 2003 The Bogside Artists
- 2003 Unquiet Voices, English and American Visionary Art 1903 – 2003
- 2004 Heralding the Apocalypse, Barry Hale
- 2005 The 45th Annual Convention of the Middleman and the Cherry Brigade – Tai Shani
- 2006 Some Bizzare Exhibition, Stevo Pearce
- 2007 Visual Athletics Club, Edward Barber
- 2007 The Other Side of the Island David J Smith
- 2008 Miron Zownir – Radical Eye
- 2008 Sandow Birk – Dante's Inferno
- 2008 Sacred Pastures – Cathy Ward, Eric Wright and Norbert Kox
- 2008 Instead of wives, they shall have toads, Stephen Fowler
- 2008 30,000 Years of Cryptomnesia
- 2008 From Fear to Sanity – CND and the Art of Protest from 1958 to 1963
- 2009 The Impossible World of Stu Mead
- 2010 HOLOGRAPHY for Beginners, Ole Hagen
- 2010 Drag and Cinema, Cinema in Drag – Brice Dellsperger
- 2010 Ian Johnstone – The 23 Stab Wounds Of Julius Caesar
- 2010 Fake Food & Fast Cars: The Pop Couture of Kate Forbes
- 2011 Adrian Di Duca: Monstrorum Historia
- 2011 Edweard Muybridge: Muybridge's Revolver
- 2011 Ronny Long – My Life on Earth 1991–2002
- 2011 Every beautiful thing... The Michael Ho Chong Collection
- 2012 The Playgrounds of War – Gina Glover
- 2012 LFP: The Queen, The Chairman And I – Kurt Tong
- 2012 The Butcher Of Common Sense
- 2012 Bunti's Picture Show – Ian Ward
- 2012 Camouflage, Revolution, and Desire – drawing from movies
- 2013 Morton Bartlett
- 2013 Jacques Katmor & The 3rd Eye Group
- 2013 BASHA: the unsung hero of Polish poster art
- 2013 The Hobo Kings and Queens of Leanne Castillo
- 2014 A Goodly Company: Ethel Le Rossignol
- 2014 Walerian Borowczyk – Posters and Lithography
- 2014 The Opium Den: Jennifer Binnie
- 2014 Nick Abrahams – Lions & Tigers & Bears
- 2014 Alien Puma Space Train: The Visionary Work Of Daniel S. Christiansen
- 2014 Saturation 70
- 2014 Stephen Holman
- 2014 Stephen Dwoskin – Ha! Ha!
- 2015 The School Of The Damned Degree Show 2015
- 2015 Melinda Gebbie: What Is The Female Gaze?
- 2015 George Tobias: My Little Kingdom
- 2015: X-Ray Audio by Stephen Coates
- 2016 The Detroit Artists Workshop
- 2016 Punk in Translation: Burst City
- 2016 Plastique Fantastique: After London
- 2016 Welcome, Space Brothers: The Unarius Academy Of Science
- 2016 Destroy All Monsters
- 2016 Autopsia: Thanatopolis
- 2017 The Higher Powers Bible: From Genesis To Revelation, Lee ‘Scratch’ Perry and Peter Harris
- 2017 Cesca Dvorak: Dewy Guises
- 2017 Peace Love And Anarchy = Freedom And Fun Forever: exhibition of the squatted house, 64–65 Guildford Street
- 2018 Jakup Ferri: Muscle memory
- 2018 The Art of Magic
- 2018 Relating Narratives: A Common World of Women
- 2018 Cathy Ward: Sub Rosa
- 2018 Trigger Warning: Films of Tessa Hughes-Freeland
- 2019 Herve Guibert: Modesty or Immodesty
- 2019 Lunar Futurism: Costumes, Props & Ephemera from Andrzej Żuławski's 'On the Silver Globe'
- 2019 Lydia Lunch Presents: SO REAL IT HURTS
- 2019 Jenkin van Zyl: Oblivion Industry
- 2019 The Gutter Art of Stephen Varble: Genderqueer Performance Art in the 1970s, photographs by Greg Day
- 2019 Psychic Communities –_ Drift Fright: New Noveta residency
- 2019 Vive Le Punk: Redressed
- 2020 Show, Don’t Tell
- 2020 Jamie Reid: Taking Liberties
- 2020 Hackers
- 2021 Eric Wright: Ohio Lands
- 2021 Alexia Marmara: My Head Leaks
- 2022 Thomas Leer and Robert Rental From The Port To The Bridge
- 2022 Icons: A Portrait Sacrarium to Sex Workers’ Rights
- 2022 Ode to Meatyard
- 2022 Valériane Venance: The Wisdom Women
- 2022 Raid/R issue 4 launch
- 2022 Nina Porter: Silent Pact
- 2022 Raft Festival
- 2022 Museum of Sex Objects
- 2022 150mg Liminal Space
- 2022 George Tobias playing with sugar
- 2022 Augenblick Press: Raintime
- 2022 Gentle Stranger Two Nights of Unlearning
- 2022 Pandora Vaughn
- 2023 Drôle
- 2023 Artists for Democracy - 1974-1977
- 2023 Four Legs Good, Two Legs Bad
- 2023 Everything Must Go
- 2023 Tashi Fay - My Other Family
- 2023 Don’t Keep The Wickerman Waiting
- 2023 Alice Fraser: kill ur darlings… lazy affair
- 2023 Gutter Sprung
- 2023 Micah Moses - Godbody
- 2023 Nicholas Williams - Coterie
- 2023 Sicko
- 2024 What’s He Doing In There?
- 2024 Le Monique Chic Show!
- 2024 Allen Ginsberg in London
- 2024 Crass: Art Exhibition
- 2024 Catarina Felix Machado: Temple
- 2024 Josephine Foster and Alexia Marmara: Anew Old Adage
