= Jane Eyre (soundtrack) =

Jane Eyre (Original Motion Picture Soundtrack)

Film score by Dario Marianelli
- Released: March 8, 2011
- Recorded: 2010–2011
- Venue: London
- Studios: Air Edel Studios; Angel Recording Studios; Abbey Road Studios
- Genre: Film score
- Length: 44:23
- Label: Sony Classical
- Producer: Dario Marianelli

Dario Marianelli chronology
Eat Pray Love (2010)	Jane Eyre (2011)	Salmon Fishing in the Yemen (2011)

Jane Eyre (Original Motion Picture Soundtrack) is the soundtrack to the 2011 film Jane Eyre directed by Cary Fukunaga based on Charlotte Brontë's 1847 novel of the same name. The album featured the original score written and composed by Dario Marianelli and featured performances by classical violinist Jack Liebeck. Hans Zimmer's protégé Benjamin Wallfisch conducted and orchestrated the score. It was released by Sony Classical Records on 8 March 2011.

== Reception ==
In his five-star review, Jonathan Broxton wrote "Jane Eyre does retain a highly classical and constant tone throughout the score, so listeners who require variety, or more action-based stimulation in their film music, are likely to find Jane Eyre something of a one-note effort. Personally, however, I found the score to be a triumph from start to finish. It's not a romantic score in the sense that Delerue wrote romantic scores – Charlotte Brontë's stories are too dour and too steeped in mist and bracken for that – but Marianelli's subtle, searching writing still allows the romanticism inherent in the story to shine through. It's a score which carefully weaves a musical web with strings as fine as silk, and draws the listener in." Filmtracks.com wrote "Altogether, the atmosphere shines elegantly at times while fading into brooding contemplation for the majority, and unless you have established yourself as a fan of dynamic virtuoso violin performances in prior film scores (such as in James Newton Howard's Defiance recently), Jane Eyre could leave you doubting all the positive buzz about this score. It's music that is meant to give you chills in subtle doses, and it clearly transcends Pride & Prejudice and will rival Atonement for sympathetic ears. Patience will be required to fully appreciate this very somber score's well-timed 44-minute album experience, one that is far easier to respect for its technicalities than enjoy for its demeanor."

James Christopher Monger of AllMusic commented on the score, saying: "The music is appropriately dark and stormy, with long, drawn-out melodies that echo the foggy moors and wet dirt roads of the English countryside. Marianelli and Liebeck dutifully capture the Gothic undertones of Bronte's influential novel while maintaining a sense of the bittersweet sentimentality that drives the mismatched lovers to such lengths, resulting in the perfect soundtrack for the cold, gray rains of March." Daniel Schweiger of AssignmentX wrote: "Dario Marianelli never fails to astound with his melodic and emotional sumptuousness, with each score like Jane Eyre almost impossibly besting the other. The Bronte sisters couldn't have found a better man to musically speak for their heroines in the form of an Italian who can so beautifully play England's agelessly repressed class system and the mental wreckage it reaps."

Andy Gill of The Independent mentioned that Marianelli's score and Liebeck's "sporadic flourishes of wild Gypsy violin lend a windswept romantic character to the music, in which the rippling piano motif cranks the tension inexorably up" and added that there is "a pleasing unity to the score, a sensibility which links the brooding warmth and the chill shiver of strings". For the track, "The End of Childhood", he said that "the harp, strings and piano are tinted with hints of woodwind and vocal in the upper register, like harbingers of complex adulthood". A. O. Scott of The New York Times wrote "Dario Marianelli's music strikes all the right chords of dread, tenderness and longing." Oliver Lyttelton of IndieWire calling it as "one of the best scores and soundtracks of 2011", commented that: "Marianelli's haunting melodies will follow you out long after the film is over. The orchestra around it is as sweeping as you could want from such a lushly photographed costume drama, but it's that lone violin that lingers."

== Track listing ==
No.	Title	Length
1.	"Wandering Jane"	03:01
2.	"A Thorough Education"	02:24
3.	"Arrival At Thornfield Hall"	01:18
4.	"The End Of Childhood"	01:13
5.	"White Skin Like The Moon"	02:43
6.	"A Game Of Badminton"	00:58
7.	"In Jest Or Earnest"	02:06
8.	"Do You Never Laugh, Miss Eyre?"	01:21
9.	"A Restless Night"	01:59
10.	"Waiting For Mr. Rochester"	02:06
11.	"Yes!"	02:01
12.	"Mrs. Reed Is Not Quite Finished"	02:23
13.	"The Wedding Dress"	02:11
14.	"An Insuperable Impediment"	02:59
15.	"Jane's Escape"	02:17
16.	"Life On The Moors"	01:23
17.	"The Call Within"	03:42
18.	"Awaken"	04:25
19.	"My Edward And I"	03:53
Total length:		44:23

== Personnel ==
- Composer, producer, liner notes – Dario Marianelli
- Conductor – Benjamin Wallfisch
- Choir contractor – Michaela Haslam
- Orchestra contractor – Hillary Skewes
- Music editor – Andy Glen, James Bellamy
- Engineer – Nick Wollage, Nick Taylor
- Assistant engineer – Fiona Cruickshank, Mat Bartram, Olga Fitzroy
- Orchestra – Rolf Wilson
- Music business and legal affairs (Focus Features) – Christine Bergren
- Liner notes – Dario Marianelli
- Executive in charge of music (Focus Features) – Jennifer Towle
- Mastering – Andrew Walters
- Orchestration – Benjamin Wallfisch, Dario Marianelli
- Photography – Laurie Sparham
- Producer – Dario Marianelli
- Project manager (Sony Classical) – Pollyanna Gunning
- Solo vocals – Melanie Pappenheim
- Piano – John Alley
- Violin – Jack Liebeck
- Music supervisor – Maggie Rodford

Source: AllMusic.
