= Kubo and the Two Strings (soundtrack) =

Kubo and the Two Strings (Original Motion Picture Soundtrack)

Soundtrack album by Dario Marianelli
- Released: August 5, 2016
- Recorded: 2015–2016
- Venue: London
- Studios: AIR Lyndhurst Hall; Abbey Road Studios
- Genre: Film score
- Length: 53:11
- Label: Warner Records

Dario Marianelli chronology
Everest (2015)	Kubo and the Two Strings (2016)	Ali and Nino (2016)

Kubo and the Two Strings (Original Motion Picture Soundtrack) is the soundtrack album to the 2016 film of the same name. The album featured original score composed by Italian composer Dario Marianelli, with a cover rendition of The Beatles-band member George Harrison's "While My Guitar Gently Weeps" performed by Regina Spektor. The score consisted of traditional Japanese music blended with Western and Eastern sounds, was recorded using ethnic instruments from Japan, in addition to modern instruments and orchestra, in order to create that feel.

The score was released on August 5, 2016, by Warner Records. It received critical acclaim with praise directed on Marianelli's compositions and called it as "one of the best film scores of his career". The score itself was considered as "one of the best film scores of 2016", despite failing to receive nomination for Original Score category, at the major award ceremonies, including Academy, Golden Globe and BAFTA.

In October 2016, Mondo released a vinyl edition of the soundtrack — 2LP-disc sets, featuring the tracks pressed on a 180-gram coloured vinyl and a special artwork based on the film. It was later re-issued in 2018.

== Development ==
In November 2015, Dario Marianelli was hired to score the film's music. The score had a cultural significance to feudal Japan, and to incorporate it, Marianelli used ethnic Japanese instruments such as shakuhachi, taiko and koto in addition to the shamisen (a Japanese stringed instrument, which is an integral part of the film's plot). (Note: the instrument was originated in China, before being re-introduced in Japan.) Besides that, he also infused western and eastern music tendencies, with the use of contemporary instruments. Marianelli said, "What we know of our very crude perception of western music is the pentatonic scale that you find on the black keys of the piano [...] But in fact there is a wealth of variety of scales in the east, so just digging a little deeper and learning about Japanese scales brought into the music much more depth". The cues for Kubo, were delivered using rock-and-roll and soul music, to bring "an action film vibe" and "experimental, when played with a typical instrumentation". Marianelli opined that "It was a combination of very delicate, at times, and very soulful playing, but other times he can really unleash hell with his instrument and can be a proper rock and roller."

The usage of contemporary and distinctive Western instrumentation and its blending with traditional Japanese, according to director Travis Knight, was "a really beautiful combination of east and west in terms of the score and had these things melding together". He appreciated Marianelli's composition, further saying "the music that he did in this movie is the best thing that he has ever done. I think it's absolutely exquisite. We're feeling exactly what we need to be feeling, we're hearing exactly what we're feeling. And it really is an expression of understanding and emotion through music, I think it's just a beautiful piece of work." Two music consultants from the United Kingdom and Japan were hired for the film, while Kevin Kmetz from Estradasphere, played the western and traditional Japanese cues through his Monsters of Shamisen band.

The Beatles' track "While My Guitar Gently Weeps" (1968) was performed by Regina Spektor which was included in the soundtrack. Speaking to an interview to Entertainment Weekly, Spektor added that "The way Travis described to me his idea for the boys' choir — the Asian instruments carry the song through, and then this orchestra sweeps in and then there's this boys' choir that comes in at the very end. He said it's almost like the children taking on the song of the mother and being the ones to carry on the story, and I really loved that he saw it all." The music video was released on August 8, 2016, that featured snippets from the film. Rolling Stone described the song as: "Marianelli's arrangement weaves a dense tapestry of string instruments – including a solo performed on the shamisen, a three-stringed Japanese lute – before closing with a reflective piano coda."

The Japanese dub instead has an instrumental version of "While My Guitar Gently Weeps" performed by the Yoshida Brothers at the request of Laika.

== Track listing ==
No.	Title	Length
1.	"The Impossible Waves"	2:37
2.	"Kubo Goes to Town"	1:25
3.	"Story Time"	2:10
4.	"Ancestors"	2:07
5.	"Meet the Sisters!"	2:22
6.	"Origami Birds"	3:25
7.	"The Giant Skeleton"	3:30
8.	"The Leafy Galleon"	4:36
9.	"Above and Below"	3:59
10.	"The Galleon Restored"	1:06
11.	"Monkey's Story"	2:57
12.	"Hanzo's Fortress"	5:45
13.	"United-Divided"	3:01
14.	"Showdown with Grandfather"	7:04
15.	"Rebirth"	1:33
16.	"While My Guitar Gently Weeps" (performed by Regina Spektor)	5:23
Total length:		53:11

== Reception ==
James Southall of Movie Wave wrote "There is an elegance to most of it which is typical of the composer, but it is largely written in a style which certainly isn't. It's so nice to hear Marianelli have such fun in a score and the tightly-produced album hasn't a dull moment." Jonathan Broxton wrote "Everything about Kubo and the Two Strings works; there has been something of a misconception recently about Dario Marianelli, especially regarding his capacity to write good action music, but this should finally be put to rest by his work on Kubo. However, as good as the action music is – and it is excellent – it is surprising that Marianelli has been able to bring together so many potentially stymieing elements and make them work as a cohesive whole. The shamisen, the other aspects of Japanese folk music, the two central themes, and of course the emotional content of the film all needed to blend together perfectly to make Kubo and the Two Strings resonate with audiences and allow them to empathize with Laika's stop-motion puppets." Christian Kolo of Soundtrack.net said "Marianelli provided this film with an absolutely outstanding score. The creative musical elements, ethnic fusion, and melodic ingenuity all come together to formulate a masterful soundtrack."

Dirk Libby of CinemaBlend wrote "Academy Award winner Dario Marianelli's score is lovely and beautiful when it needs to be, and jarring when it is required. The highlights, however, are the eastern inspired tunes played by Kubo himself in the film. Music is magic in Kubo and the Two Strings, and the music played by Kubo is the most transportive in the film. The up-tempo shamisen lead pieces of music will draw you into the story as much as the visual style. Although, the real ear worm you won't be able to get out of your head will be Regina Spektor's cover of The Beatles' "While My Guitar Gently Weeps" played over the closing credits." David Ehrlich of IndieWire stated "Dario Marianelli's lush and lively score helps sell the small-scale spectacle of Kubo's gift". Wendy Ide of The Guardian called the score as "gorgeous" and "surging".

The score was hailed as one of Marianelli's best works, followed by Pride & Prejudice (2005), Atonement (2007) and The Boxtrolls (2014). Several websites such as Empire, Collider, IndieWire and The Film Stage. It has been shortlisted as one of the 145 scores being eligible for the Best Original Score category at the 89th Academy Awards, but was not selected. The score further snubbed from various categories at major award ceremonies, despite critical acclaim.

== Release history ==
Region	Date	Format(s)	Label	Editions	Catalog code	Ref.
Various	August 5, 2016	Digital download; streaming	Warner Records	Standard	—N/a	
United States	August 26, 2016	CD	Warner Records	Standard	556454-2	
United States	October 7, 2016	Vinyl	Mondo	Standard	MOND-097	
United States	May 4, 2018	Vinyl	Mondo	Limited	MOND-097	
Japan	September 7, 2016	CD	Giza Studio	Japanese	WPCS 13744	

== Personnel ==
Credits adapted from CD liner notes

- Composer and conductor – Dario Marianelli
- Music programmer – Jody Jenkins
- Score editor – Timeri Duplat
- Music editor – Dominick Certo, James Bellamy
- Music supervisor – Maggie Rodford, Emily Appleton-Holley
- Copyist – Colin Rae
- Design – Rob Jones
- Artwork – Cesar Moreno
- Legal business advisor – Christine Bergren
- Production manager – Mo Shafeek
- Audio recording and mixing – Nick Wollage (Air Lyndhurst Hall)
- Mastering – Andrew Walter (Abbey Road Studios)
- Score engineers – Adam Miller, Chris Barrett, Fiona Cruickshank
- Instruments and orchestra:
  - Koto – Melissa Holding
  - Shakuhachi – Clive Bell
  - Shamisen – Hibiki Ichikawa, Keven Kmetz
  - Solo vocalist – Melanie Pappenheim
  - Choir – Libera Boys Choir (trebel), Doublefvoices (adult)
  - Conductor – Robert Prizeman
  - Orchestra leader – Rolf Wilson
  - Orchestrators – Geoff Alexander, Dario Marianelli
  - Orchestra contractor – Hilary Skewes
