= Becoming Jane (soundtrack) =

Becoming Jane (Original Motion Picture Score)

Soundtrack album / film score by Adrian Johnston
- Released: 31 July 2007
- Recorded: 2007
- Genre: Film score
- Length: 46:50
- Label: Sony Classical
- Producer: Adrian Johnston

Adrian Johnston chronology
Gideon's Daughter (2006)	Becoming Jane (Original Motion Picture Score) (2007)	Brideshead Revisited (2008)

Becoming Jane (Original Motion Picture Score) is the score album to the 2007 film Becoming Jane starring Anne Hathaway and James McAvoy and directed by Julian Jarrold. The film's musical score was written by English composer Adrian Johnston and released through Sony Classical Records on 31 July 2007.

== Background ==
The film's score was written by English composer Adrian Johnston. To prepare melodies, he reviewed music books that had belonged to the Austen family. The first track, "First Impressions", has been described as a "depressing" song that "exhibits slow, pure and classical piano work"; one critic quipped that it belonged in Becoming Sylvia Plath. Later tracks ranged "in mood from upbeat and playful to somber and teary". Henry Purcell's "Hole in the Wall," also known as "St. Martin's Lane," which is featured in the ballroom scene, was first published in 1695 and is highly unlikely to have been common during the Regency, when Jane Austen was a young adult. The song was included as a bonus track in the album.

== Critical reception ==
In his review of the score, Tim Clark of Soundtrack.net lamented the "absence of a truly memorable theme, despite a wealth of thematic material", and found similarities to Dario Marianelli's composition for the 2005 film Pride & Prejudice. Patsy Morita, a music critic for Allmusic, wrote that the second half of Johnston's score becomes as "unremarkable" as "so many other dramatic film scores of the early twenty-first century". She continued, "It fulfills its purpose of underscoring the emotion of the story by being moody and slow to change melodically and harmonically, and by using many pregnant pauses and minimalist-leaning repetitive figures." Steven Weintraub of Collider called "Adrian Johnston's score is a thing of beauty". Ray Bennett of The Hollywood Reporter wrote that Johnston's score "matches the high level of Jarrold's assured direction." Richard von Busack of Metro Silicon Valley wrote "one has to tune out Adrian Johnston's soundtrack, with those woodwinds burbling away every time something roguish happens".

== Track listing ==
Becoming Jane (Original Motion Picture Score) track listing
No.	Title	Length
1.	"First Impressions"	2:27
2.	"Hampshire"	0:40
3.	"Bond Street Airs"	1:48
4.	"Basingstoke Assembly"	2:03
5.	"A Game of Cricket"	2:47
6.	"Selbourne Wood"	2:29
7.	"Lady Gresham"	2:10
8.	"Advice from a Young Lady"	1:06
9.	"Laverton Fair"	0:58
10.	"To the Ball"	3:17
11.	"Rose Garden"	2:31
12.	"Mrs. Radcliffe"	2:24
13.	"Goodbye Mr. Lefroy"	1:48
14.	"Distant Lives"	2:57
15.	"The Messenger"	1:22
16.	"An Adoring Heart"	1:21
17.	"Runaways"	2:01
18.	"A Letter from Limerick"	1:50
19.	"The Loss of Yours"	1:05
20.	"To Be Apart"	2:33
21.	"Deh vieni, non tardar" (from Le Nozze di Figaro)	3:22
22.	"Twenty Years Later"	1:19
23.	"A Last Reading"	2:39

Becoming Jane (Original Motion Picture Score) bonus tracks
No.	Title	Length
1.	"The Basingstoke Assembly: The Grand Vizier's Flight"	2:26
2.	"Lady Gresham's Ball: Mutual Love"	3:35
3.	"The Basingstoke Assembly: Softly Good Tummas"	3:31
4.	"The Basingstoke Assembly: The Happy Hit"	2:37
5.	"The Basingstoke Assembly: A Trip to Paris"	1:32
6.	"Lady Gresham's Ball: The Hole in the Wall" (from Henry Purcell's Abdelazar)	2:12

== Accolades ==
Accolades for Becoming Jane (Original Motion Picture Score)
Award	Category	Recipients	Result
Ivor Novello Awards	Best Original Film Score	Adrian Johnston	Nominated
