= Everest (soundtrack) =

2015 film soundtrack album

Everest (Original Motion Picture Soundtrack)

Film score by Dario Marianelli
- Released: September 18, 2015
- Recorded: 2015
- Studio: Angel Recording Studios, London; Abbey Road Studios, London
- Genre: Film score
- Length: 48:52
- Label: Varèse Sarabande
- Producer: Dario Marianelli

Dario Marianelli chronology
| Wild Card (2015) | Everest (2015) | Kubo and the Two Strings (2016) |

Everest (Original Motion Picture Soundtrack) is the film score to the 2015 film Everest directed by Baltasar Kormákur. The film score is composed by Dario Marianelli which was recorded at the Angel Recording Studios and Abbey Road Studios, and is performed by the London Session Orchestra with Marianelli conducting. The original score album was released through Varèse Sarabande on September 18, 2015.

== Development ==
In July 2014, it was announced that Dario Marianelli would compose the film score for Everest. Marianelli stated that his initial approach was to have a calling voice, a distant siren call, which Kormákur had liked it and encouraged this approach. He found the siren voice being a representation of the ancient goddess-like mountain, but also a "luring and irresistible calling to one's own shipwreck". The opposite spectrum of the score was the "arrogant, conquering" attitude of the mountaineers which provided a "macho, go-getting approach to nature" that was reflected in a more propulsive, percussive and energetic score.

Marianelli decided to progress with the score in order, composing the opening sequence first and carried with the rest of the scenes, step by step to progress with the same journey with the mountaineers as the adventure evolved. Melanie Pappenheim who had performed vocals for Marianelli's scores, had recorded the vocal piece of "siren cal" which was accompanied by his norm string players: cellist Caroline Dale and violinist David La Page performing the solos. Marianelli recorded the orchestral score with a group of strings and numerous brass players, where some of the brass textures were designed to take advantage of the sheer power of the brass instruments, when the players perform chord clusters and moments where Marianelli tried to evoke a sort of "primal, raw power" in certain sequences, to build a pressure with the brass. Marianelli conducted the score with the London Session Orchestra.

== Release ==
The original score was released through Varèse Sarabande on September 18, 2015.

== Reception ==
Marcy Donelson of AllMusic called the music "alternately warm, tense, clattering, and majestic". Jonathan Broxton of Movie Music UK stated that "Everest is a decent enough score by most people's standards, but unusually for Marianelli it doesn't have that special 'something' that allows it to be mentioned among his best works". He further added that, "Considering the tremendous scope for great emotion and drama a story like this can inspire, it spends rather too much of its time noodling around with pretty but insubstantial cello and piano textures which come nowhere close to emulating the stirring passion of something like Pride & Prejudice or Jane Eyre, subtly hinting at geographic locations with small amounts of regional color, and presenting action material that seems less well-developed than it should be."

James Southall of Movie Wave wrote "Everest has some moments of really high quality but also some which are surprisingly bland and anonymous, a curious mix of the composer's typically classy style with generic Remote Control era stylings that only sporadically works. When it focuses on the beauty of the mountain or the emotions of the climbers it certainly succeeds and those parts of the score are very satisfying, but other parts are just a bit too soulless to make me think many people are going to listen to this one very often. The peaks are very good; but you have to navigate more troughs than you might expect in order to reach them." Drew Powell of Madison Park Times called it a "thundering instrumental score". Kate Taylor of The Globe and Mail said that "Dario Marianelli's overwrought score keeps intruding". Michael Philips of Daily Press called it a "somber, mournful" score.

== Track listing ==
| No. | Title | Artist(s) | Length |
|---|---|---|---|
| 1. | "The Call" | | 3:11 |
| 2. | "Setting Off from Kathmandu" | | 1:16 |
| 3. | "First Trek: Base Camp" | | 2:30 |
| 4. | "Arriving at the Temple" | The Monks of Tharig Monastery | 1:01 |
| 5. | "The Lowdown" | | 2:36 |
| 6. | "A Close Shave" | | 3:25 |
| 7. | "Starting the Ascent" | | 3:06 |
| 8. | "To Camp Four" | | 2:09 |
| 9. | "Someone Loves Us" | | 1:56 |
| 10. | "Summit" | | 4:57 |
| 11. | "Time Runs Out" | | 6:58 |
| 12. | "Lost" | | 2:23 |
| 13. | "Last Words" | | 2:58 |
| 14. | "Beck Gets Up" | | 2:55 |
| 15. | "Chopper Rescue" | | 2:20 |
| 16. | "Epilogue" | | 5:11 |
| Total length: | | | 48:52 |

== Personnel ==
Credits adapted from liner notes:

- Music composer, conductor and producer – Dario Marianelli
- Performer – London Session Orchestra
- Cello – Caroline Dale
- Violin – David Le Page
- Vocals – Melanie Pappenheim
- Orchestrators – Dario Marianelli, Geoff Alexander
- Programming – Jody Jenkins, Rael Jones
- Engineer – Chris Parker
- Recording and mixing – Peter Fuchs
- Mastering – Andrew Walter
- Score editor – Chris Benstead, James Bellamy, Yann McCullough
- Assistant music supervisor – Laura Nakhla
- Music supervisor – Maggie Rodford
- Music services – Cutting Edge
- Contractor – Hilary Skewes
- Music coordinator – Chris Piccaro
- Copyist – Colin Rae
- Executive music producer – Robert Townson, Darren Blumenthal, James Gibb
- Music business and legal affairs for Universal Pictures – Charles M. Barsamian, Meghan Kozlosky
- Executive in charge of music for Universal Pictures – Mike Knobloch
