= Chris Field =

Christopher or Chris Field may refer to:

- Chris Field (composer), American singer, songwriter, film composer
- Chris Field (general), Australian Army officer
- Christopher Field, director of the Carnegie Institution's Department of Global Ecology
