= Salmon Fishing in the Yemen (soundtrack) =

Salmon Fishing in the Yemen (Original Motion Picture Soundtrack)

Film score by Dario Marianelli
- Released: 20 February 2012
- Recorded: 2011–2012
- Venue: London
- Studio: AIR Studios; Abbey Road Studios
- Genre: Film score
- Length: 42:08
- Label: Lakeshore
- Producer: Dario Marianelli

Dario Marianelli chronology
Jane Eyre (2011)	Salmon Fishing in the Yemen (2012)	Anna Karenina (2012)

Salmon Fishing in the Yemen (Original Motion Picture Soundtrack) is the film score composed by Dario Marianelli to the 2012 film Salmon Fishing in the Yemen directed by Lasse Hallström starring Ewan McGregor, Emily Blunt, Kristin Scott Thomas and Amr Waked.

== Background ==
Dario Marianelli composed the film score. It was recorded at the AIR Studios and Abbey Road Studios in London and performed by the BBC Concert Orchestra conducted by Benjamin Wallfisch and orchestrated by Marianelli and Wallfisch. The score also featured contributions from guitarist Leo Abrahams, woodwinds player Dirk Campbell and oud player Giles Lewin. The score was released through Lakeshore Records on 20 February 2012.

== Reception ==
James Southall of Movie Wave praised the soundtrack of Salmon Fishing in the Yemen, saying "it is the unabashed enthusiasm of the most exuberant passages that really make this just about impossible to dislike." Critic Roger Ebert called it a "schmaltzy score by Dario Marianelli." Kimber Myers of IndieWire wrote "Even the normally solid composer Dario Marianelli offers an uninspired score that predictably swoons along with the film's more sentimental moments." Don Groves of SBS called it a "swooning score". Peter Debruge of Variety noted it as an "invasively upbeat score". Critic based at The Hollywood Reporter described it as "melancholic".

== Track listing ==
No.	Title	Length
1.	"Prologue"	3:59
2.	"Machinations"	2:09
3.	"Scotland"	1:53
4.	"Inspirational Sheik"	2:23
5.	"Dreams"	1:29
6.	"A Turn for the Worse"	2:35
7.	"To the Yemen"	4:07
8.	"The Threat"	1:11
9.	"It's in Your DNA!"	2:18
10.	"Salmon Fishing"	1:43
11.	"Big Projects"	3:21
12.	"Rob Returns"	2:29
13.	"Disaster"	3:45
14.	"Goodbye Hello"	2:36
15.	"Happy Ending"	4:40
16.	"Bonus Bach"	1:30
Total length:		42:08

== Personnel ==
Credits adapted from liner notes:

- Music composer and producer – Dario Marianelli
- Orchestra – BBC Concert Orchestra
- Orchestrators – Benjamin Wallfisch, Dario Marianelli
- Conductor – Benjamin Wallfisch
- Leader – Cynthia Miller
- Acoustic guitar – Leo Abrahams
- Ethnic woodwinds – Dirk Campbell
- Oud – Giles Lewin
- Piano – Dario Marianelli
- Sound engineers – Fiona Cruickshank, Jake Gill, Olga Fitzroy
- Recording and mixing – Nick Wollage
- Mastering – Andy Walter
- Score editor – James Bellamy
- Music supervisor – Maggie Rodford
- Assistant music supervisor – Helen Yates
- Executive producer – Brian McNelis, Skip Williamson
- Copyist – Colin Rae
- Art direction – John Bergin
- A&R – Eric Craig

== Accolades ==
Awards	Category	Recipient	Result	Ref.
International Film Music Critics Association	Best Original Score for a Comedy Film	Dario Marianelli	Nominated	
