= Agora (soundtrack) =

2009 film soundtrack album

Film score by Dario Marianelli
- Released: 29 September 2009
- Recorded: 2009
- Venue: London
- Studio: AIR Lyndhurst Hall; AIR-Edel Recording Studios
- Genre: Film score
- Length: 56:55
- Label: Warner Music Spain
- Producer: Dario Marianelli

Dario Marianelli chronology
The Soloist (2009)	Agora (2009)	Everybody's Fine (2009)

Agora (Spanish: Ágora) is the film score to the 2009 historical drama film of the same name directed by Alejandro Amenábar starring Rachel Weisz, Max Minghella and Oscar Isaac. The album featured 18 tracks from the original score composed and co-orchestrated by Dario Marianelli which was recorded at the AIR Lyndhurst Hall and AIR-Edel Recording Studios. The album was released through Warner Music Spain on 29 September 2009.

== Background ==
Alejandro Amenábar who often had composed music for his directorials wanted someone to be entrusted on the composing duties. Amenábar, who had admired Dario Marianelli's work, wanted him to compose the music for the film, to which Marianelli agreed. The score was recorded at the AIR Lyndhurst Hall and AIR-Edel Recording Studios in London, which was co-orchestrated and conducted by Benjamin Wallfisch.

== Reception ==
David Vega of Tio Oscar wrote "Agora is the musical miracle that elevates Dario Marianelli as the star to watch in the increasingly tenuous universe of film music." Jonathan Broxton of Movie Music UK wrote "Contrary to expectations, 2009 is turning into an impressive year for film music, and Agora is another one of those unheralded scores which crept up out of nowhere and could very well go on to be regarded as one of the best of the year. If you have an aversion to ‘wailing women’ in your film music, or dislike overly Middle Eastern influences, then Agora might not be the score for you, as both elements feature prominently throughout. However, I personally found the combination of these elements, a strong orchestral presence, and impassioned emotions to be quite excellent, and well worth exploring."

Christian Clemmensen of Filmtracks wrote "the 57-minute Agora album is a dramatic powerhouse worthy of a position in any collection, and it easily resides among 2009's best scores." Todd McCarthy of Variety wrote "Dario Marianelli’s score is rich, with occasional swells into the bombastic." Kalaisan of Music Muse wrote "Marianelli delivers an extraordinarily intellectual epic of a score that addresses the concepts of the film more aptly than most in the industry currently can". Daniel Schweiger of Film Music Magazine wrote "For what’s essentially a doomed love story, with knowledge as the victim, Marianelli’s surging score helps build some of the most beguiling sets since D. W. Griffith created Babylon for Intolerance, then employs the melodic bliss of astronomical discovery, all before soaring strings and voices tragically point out the ironic futility of it all."

== Track listing ==
No.	Title	Length
1.	"Have You Ever Asked Yourselves"	2:51
2.	"Alexandra"	2:07
3.	"The Miracle of the Bread"	4:22
4.	"Thinking Aloud"	2:25
5.	"Orestes' Offering"	2:00
6.	"An Insult to the Gods"	1:04
7.	"What Do the Skies See?"	4:37
8.	"Aristarchus the Visionary"	3:04
9.	"The Library Falls"	2:39
10.	"Two Hundred Thousand Books"	6:06
11.	"The Rule of the Parabolani"	2:02
12.	"A Boat Experiment"	3:57
13.	"If I Could Just Unravel This"	2:59
14.	"As Christian As You Are"	1:55
15.	"Ungodliness and Witchcraft"	3:01
16.	"The Truth Is Elliptical"	5:03
17.	"Hypatia's Last Walk"	2:33
18.	"The Skies Do Not Fall"	4:10
Total length:		56:55

== Personnel ==
Credits adapted from liner notes:

- Music composer and producer – Dario Marianelli
- Cello – Caroline Dale
- Drum programming – Jody Jenkins
- Duduk – Dirk Campbell
- Vocals – Parvin Cox
- Orchestrators – Dario Marianelli, Benjamin Wallfisch
- Conductor – Benjamin Wallfisch
- Concertmaster – Rolf Wilson
- Contractor – Clarissa Farran, Hilary Skewes
- Choir – Synergy Vocals
- Engineer – Chris Barrett, Lawrence Greed, Nick Taylor, Tom Bullen
- Recording and mixing – Nick Wollage
- Music editor – Tony Lewis
- Assistant music editor – Bertie Spiegelberg
- Supervising music editor – James Bellamy

== Accolades ==
Awards	Category	Recipient(s)	Result	Ref.
Goya Awards	Best Original Score	Dario Marianelli	Nominated	
International Film Music Critics Association	Best Original Score for a Drama Film	Dario Marianelli	Nominated	
