= I Went Down =

- Directed by: Paddy Breathnach
- Written by: Conor McPherson
- Produced by: Robert Walpole
- Starring: Peter McDonald; Brendan Gleeson
- Cinematography: Cian de Buitléar
- Edited by: Emer Reynolds
- Music by: Dario Marianelli
- Production companies: Artisan Entertainment; BBC Films; Irish Film Board; Raidió Teilifís Éireann; Easkel Media; Treasure Entertainment; Shooting Gallery
- Distributed by: Buena Vista International (Ireland/United Kingdom); Artisan Entertainment (United States)
- Release dates: 3 October 1997 (Ireland); 26 January 1998 (United Kingdom); 24 June 1998 (United States)
- Running time: 107 minutes
- Countries: Ireland; United Kingdom; United States
- Language: English

I Went Down is a 1997 Irish crime comedy film by director Paddy Breathnach.

The film is initially set in Dublin. A working class man is released from prison, and soon rescues his best friend from mutilation at the hands of mobsters. The local crime boss decides that the man has to pay for his friend's gambling debts, and tasks him with locating and retrieving a missing associate of the crime boss in Cork.

== Plot ==
After serving an eight-month prison sentence for breaking and entering, working class Dublin lad Git Hynes, meets ex-girlfriend Sabrina Bradley, who now prefers his best friend Anto. She asks Git to reassure Anto that he accepts this. On meeting Anto in a bar, Git finds that the latter's gambling addiction has left him in debt to the bookies, who are about to take his fingers as collateral. Git saves his friend, but permanently disfigures the ringleader, the nephew of widely feared mob boss, Tom French.

At a sit-down, Tom French decrees that Git must work off Anto's debt. He is ordered to find French's associate Frank Grogan in Cork, and bring him back to Dublin. Holding Anto as a hostage, French pairs the reluctant Git with half-wit and heavy-handed mobster, Bunny Kelly.

After robbing a petrol station and dumping their stolen car, Bunny and Git steal another car. They drive to a remote bog area to rendezvous with a "Friendly Face". However, arriving too late, they drive to Cork, but find that Grogan has left his hotel. Following a tip, they drive to The Black & Amber Inn, a pub that Grogan frequents. However, Git is attacked by mobsters who break his nose. Bunny painfully re-sets Git's nose for him. Returning to the pub, they follow the mobsters to a secluded house. Bunny and Git conclude that Frank Grogan is being held against his will and decide to rescue him.

The following morning, Bunny gives Git a pistol. They enter the house, find Grogan, and flee, engaging in a gunfight with the mobsters. Grogan asks where he is being taken. When informed that he is being taken to French, Grogan panics and attempts to flee. Grogan is then bundled into the boot. After phoning French's associates, Bunny and Git are informed that the "Friendly Face" will be at the bogs the following day, to receive Grogan. They release Grogan from the boot and head for the rendezvous. In Grogan's incessant, self-aggrandizing chatter, he claims to be having an affair with French's wife and that French only wants him for that reason. Grogan is ignored by Bunny, who then abandons the car and steals a Mercedes-Benz.

Arriving at the rendezvous, Bunny refuses to leave the car. Git and Grogan go to meet the "Friendly Face". Grogan, certain he will be murdered, begs Git not to leave him. Git agrees. At the rendezvous, Grogan does not recognise the man and is fearful. The "Friendly Face" pulls a gun and forces them to kneel. Grogan offers the "Friendly Face" £50,000 for his own release and to kill Git. Before this happens, Bunny arrives and holds the "Friendly Face" at gunpoint. After stuffing him into the boot of his own car, Git and Bunny drag Grogan back to the Mercedes, and interrogate him.

Grogan reveals that he and French were partners, along with a legendary and long missing 1970s Dublin mob boss named Sonny Mulligan. Sonny came into possession of one side of a plate to print 20-dollar bills. Without the other half, it was useless. French later came into possession of the other side of the plates. Eager to get both plates, French offered Grogan £5,000. Grogan refused, instead opting to sell his half for £10,000 to a criminal from London. French, however, counter-offered. He had found a buyer for both plates, offering £100,000. French agreed to a 50–50 deal, and offered Grogan £25,000 up-front. French's wife was to deliver the money, but Grogan says she never showed up.

Phoning French, a meeting is arranged. Anto will be released and the deal closed. The trio check into a hotel. Bunny and Git tie Grogan up, so they can enjoy the swimming pool and bar. Bunny and Git both pick up women in the bar and have one-night stands with then. As they smoke during pillow-talk, Git reveals that his prison sentence was because he took the fall for the theft of a television by his elderly and drunken father. Git expresses grief that his father died right after he started his prison term and that going to gaol ruined his relationship with Sabrina. But Git expresses a desire to move on with his life without ever telling Sabrina the truth. When Bunny and Git return to the room, they find Grogan has escaped. Before leaving, Grogan made three phone calls; one to a Cork number, one to a taxi company, and one to a nearby hotel. Bunny and Git head there. Grogan has checked in under a false name, but Bunny recognises his deception. Grogan's associates from Cork arrive soon after, forcing Bunny and Git to flee again with Grogan in the boot of the car. The trio then head for the rendezvous with French. Leaving Grogan with Bunny, Git and French head into the woods to dig up a package with one of the plates. French, Git, Grogan, and Bunny then head to another area, where French instructs them to dig another area where the skeletal remains of Sonny Mulligan is uncovered.

French and Grogan then reveal what really happened. During the 1970s, Mulligan had "borrowed" the plates from an American criminal gang, on condition that he did not print more than $50,000, which was to be his retirement money. French married Mulligan's niece (whom Grogan proceeded to have an extramarital affair with). French urged Mulligan to print more than the agreed $50,000, but Sonny refused and the two had a blazing argument at French's wedding. Grogan and French decided to steal the plates, print their own batch, and then return the plates without Mulligan ever knowing. Mulligan, however, always kept one of the plates in his possession. Grogan spied on Mulligan and saw where he had buried the other plate. But when Mulligan saw Grogan spying on him, Grogan shot him dead and took the other plate. Burying him, Grogan and French only narrowly avoided being killed by Mulligan's relatives and by the American gangsters. They told both that Mulligan stole the plates and fled Ireland with them. Soon after, French learned of Grogan's affair with his wife and the two gangsters parted for good.

Back in the present, an outraged French demands to know where his wife is. Grogan insists that Mrs. French never met him. Realizing that French's wife has absconded with the £25,000, Bunny laughs hysterically. Seething, French picks up the pistol buried with Mulligan, shoots Grogan dead, and snaps, "That was for Sonny." Snarling, "And this is for fucking my wife," French shoots Grogan's corpse a second time.

French then shoots Bunny in the elbow before Git kills him. Bunny and Git bury Grogan and French alongside the bones of Sonny Mulligan and leave with the plates. Several months later, Bunny meets Git's ex-girlfriend, Sabrina, in a snooker hall and gives her an envelope containing several thousand pounds; a gift from Git. Bunny tells Sabrina that Git has gone to America and he will now follow. Suspiciously, Sabrina asks if Git knows anything about French's disappearance, but Bunny smiles and says that French pulled an insurance scam and fled the country. Gently, Bunny tells Sabrina how deeply Git loves her and urges her to learn to forgive him, saying, "The benefit of the doubt can even save your life."

As Bunny leaves, Anto argues over a new gambling debt as Sabrina eyes him with dismay. Meanwhile, Bunny meets Git, who was secretly waiting outside. After a short conversation, Bunny and Git head to the airport.

== Cast ==
- Peter McDonald as Git Hynes
- Brendan Gleeson as Bunny Kelly
- Tony Doyle as Tom French
  - John Bergin as young Tom French
- Peter Caffrey as Frank Grogan
  - Don Wycherley as young Frank Grogan
- Antoine Byrne as Sabrina Bradley
- David Wilmot as Anto
- Donal O'Kelly as "The Friendly Face"
- Johnny Murphy as Sonny Mulligan
- Carly Baker as Caroline
- Michael McElhatton as Johnner Doyle
- Joe Gallagher as Steo Gannon
- Kevin Hely as Petrol Station Attendant
- Eamonn Hunt as Cork Barman
- Frank O'Sullivan as Cork Man 1
- Jason Byrne as Cork Man 2
- Eamon A. Kelly as Cork Man 3

== Reception ==
=== Critical response ===
On Rotten Tomatoes the film has an approval rating of 84% based on 19 reviews. On Metacritic the film has a score of 69% based on reviews from 16 critics.

Janet Maslin of The New York Times praised it for "steering clear of Irish movie stereotypes and instead showing off a spare and quizzical indie spirit".

Roger Ebert gave it 3 out of 4 stars, and wrote: "It takes the form of a road movie and the materials of gangster movies [...] but what happens is beside the point. It's what they say while it's happening that makes the movie so entertaining."

=== Awards ===
The film won several awards. Paddy Breathnach won Best New Director and the Jury Prize at the San Sebastian Film Festival and won Best Director at Thessaloniki 1997 and Best Film at Bogotá Film Festival 1998. Screenwriter Conor McPherson also won awards and acclaim for his script.

== Home media ==
The film was released on VHS in 1998. It was also released in Australia on DVD in 1998. The film was released on DVD in the UK and Ireland only in December 2011.
