= Eat Pray Love (soundtrack) =

Eat Pray Love (Original Motion Picture Soundtrack)

Soundtrack album by various artists
- Released: July 20, 2010
- Recorded: 2010
- Genre: Film soundtrack
- Length: 59:39 (standard); 77:41 (deluxe)
- Label: Madison Gate Records
- Producer: Dede Gardner; Ryan Murphy (exec.)

Eat Pray Love (Original Motion Picture Soundtrack) is the soundtrack album to the 2010 film Eat Pray Love directed by Ryan Murphy based on Elizabeth Gilbert's 2006 memoir and starred Julia Roberts as Gilbert. The album accompanied 14 songs performed by an assortment of musicians, and a score cue composed by Dario Marianelli. The album was released through Madison Gate Records on July 20, 2010, and also featured a deluxe edition that contained 8 tracks of Marianelli's score.

== Background ==
The soundtrack to Eat Pray Love consisted of 24 tracks ranging from pop, jazz and rock to Indian classical music in tandem with the storyline. Eddie Vedder, Josh Rouse, Gato Barbieri, Neil Young, Marvin Gaye, U. Srinivas and Nusrat Fateh Ali Khan. Vedder wrote an original song for the film, titled "Better Days", while his song "The Long Road" with Ali Khan was also in the film and album. Dario Marianelli's score only consisted of one piece in the soundtrack, while the remaining eight cues were featured in the deluxe edition.

== Marketing ==
The audio CDs of the soundtrack was marketed with Starbucks and featured in several chains across United States.

== Reception ==
Carol Anne Szel of Goldmine called it a "mixed bag" and added "The movie’s soundtrack is a musical puzzle that can’t be put together". Aseem Chhabra of The Caravan wrote, "Eat Pray Love does have a few redeeming qualities, most important being the soundtrack. Murphy has packed it with several classic songs and pieces of music that have previously featured in other films[...]". Justin Chang of Variety wrote, "Dario Marianelli’s score provides melodious connective tissue for a soundtrack swollen with opera, Neil Young and various locale-appropriate tunes". According to James Christopher Monger of AllMusic, "the accompanying soundtrack offers up a nice blend of contemporary pop, region/story-specific world music, and classic rock and soul".

== Track listing ==
Eat Pray Love (Original Motion Picture Soundtrack) — standard edition
No.	Title	Artist(s)	Length
1.	"Flight Attendant"	Josh Rouse	4:48
2.	"Last Tango In Paris Suite Pt. 2"	Gato Barbieri	1:26
3.	"Thank You (Falettinme Be Mice Elf Agin)"	Sly and the Family Stone	4:49
4.	"Der Hölle Rache Kocht In Meinem Herzen" (from Mozart's The Magic Flute)	Wolfgang Amadeus Mozart	2:53
5.	"Heart of Gold"	Neil Young	3:08
6.	"Kaliyugavaradana"	U. Srinivas	4:40
7.	"The Long Road"	Eddie Vedder and Nusrat Fateh Ali Khan	5:31
8.	"Harvest Moon"	Neil Young	4:59
9.	"Samba Da Bençáo"	Bebel Gilberto	4:46
10.	"Wave"	João Gilberto	4:42
11.	"Got to Give It Up (Part 1)"	Marvin Gaye	4:03
12.	"'S Wonderful"	Joao Gilberto	4:09
13.	"Better Days"	Eddie Vedder	4:11
14.	"Attraversiamo"	Dario Marianelli	5:34
Total length:			59:39

Eat Pray Love (Original Motion Picture Soundtrack) — deluxe edition
No.	Title	Artist(s)	Length
15.	"The Medicine Man"	Dario Marianelli	2:20
16.	"Goodbyes"	Dario Marianelli	2:44
17.	"The Augusteum"	Dario Marianelli	4:19
18.	"Suzie Creamcheese"	Dario Marianelli	1:43
19.	"Enjoy Bali"	Dario Marianelli	1:36
20.	"It's Time"	Dario Marianelli	1:47
21.	"I Am Not Going"	Dario Marianelli	1:31
22.	"Blue Tiles"	Dario Marianelli	2:02
Total length:			77:41

== Chart performance ==
Chart (2010)	Peak position
Austrian Albums (Ö3 Austria)	59
UK Compilation Albums (OCC)	87
UK Soundtrack Albums (OCC)	16
US Billboard 200	42
US Top Soundtracks (Billboard)	4
