= Ailsa (film) =

- Directed by: Paddy Breathnach
- Starring: Brendan Coyle
- Music by: Dario Marianelli
- Release date: 1994
- Running time: 75 minutes
- Country: Ireland
- Language: English

Ailsa is a 1994 Irish film directed by Paddy Breathnach and starring Brendan Coyle and Andrea Irvine. His first feature film, it garnered Breathnach the Euskal Media Award for best new director at the San Sebastian International Film Festival. The film also received nominations at the Stockholm Film Festival and the Torino International Festival of Young Cinema.

The style and theme of Ailsa was generally perceived as "European". It was released at a time when the Irish film industry was experiencing enormous growth. It is based on a short story by the Irish novelist Joseph O'Connor.

== Cast ==
- Brendan Coyle as Miles Butler
- Andrea Irvine as Sara
- Juliette Gruber as Campbell Rourke
- Gary Lydon as Jack
- Blanaid Irvine as Vera
