= Shrooms (film) =

2007 horror film

- Theatrical release poster
- Directed by: Paddy Breathnach
- Written by: Pearse Elliott
- Produced by: Paddy McDonald; Rob Walpole
- Starring: Lindsey Haun; Jack Huston; Max Kasch; Maya Hazen; Alice Greczyn; Don Wycherley; Sean McGinley; Robert Hoffman
- Cinematography: Nanu Segal
- Edited by: Dermot Diskin
- Music by: Dario Marianelli
- Production companies: Treasure Films; Potboiler Productions
- Distributed by: Vertigo Films (United Kingdom); Capitol Films (Overseas)
- Release date: 23 November 2007
- Running time: 86 minutes
- Countries: Denmark; Ireland; United Kingdom
- Language: English
- Box office: $4.9 million

Shrooms is a 2007 psychological horror film written by Pearse Elliot and directed by Paddy Breathnach. The film stars Lindsey Haun, Jack Huston, and Max Kasch. Its plot follows a group of American students and their English guide who are stalked by a serial killer while out in the woods looking for psilocybin mushrooms.

== Plot ==
American student Tara and her college friends visit Ireland to meet with local resident and friend Jake, and go camping in woodlands surrounding a long-disused children's home. While collecting psilocybin mushrooms for later consumption, Tara eats a death bell mushroom (Galerina) and suffers a seizure after which she experiences dream-like trances in which she begins having premonitions of future events.

Around the evening camp fire, with Tara resting in her tent, Jake tells a ghost story of the empty children's home nearby, and of a violent sadistic monk who survived an assault by one of his charges, as revenge for killing his twin brother. Overhearing this causes Tara to have premonitions of the murders of her friends.

After a deathly row with his girlfriend and the others, aggressive jock Bluto drinks some of the hallucinogenic tea (supposedly for all to share in the morning) and experiences a trip which culminates in his murder, seemingly at the hands of the rogue monk from the children's home.

The following morning, unconcerned by Bluto's disappearance – the others consume the mushroom tea, only to become separated from one another in the woods while under its effects. The three women, arguing and squabbling, get lost until they themselves are split, and Holly and Lisa are violently murdered – in accordance with Tara's continuing visions – after an encounter with local woodsmen Ernie and Bernie.

Jake and Troy find Tara on the bank of a river, and tell her to meet them in the abandoned home to summon help. Upon investigating the property, Troy is apparently killed by the monk, and Jake escapes by jumping from a high window, breaking his leg as he lands. Tara finds him and the two flee the haunted scene. Then, while resting his leg, he is murdered.

Tara awakes as a Garda helicopter hovers over the camp, and is dispatched into an ambulance as the sole survivor. As her mobile phone rings, Tara experiences a rapid flashback and realizes that the death bell mushroom caused her to murder all of her friends. She asks the paramedic for help. Everything becomes quiet until it’s revealed that Tara, still under the influence of the death bell, has killed the paramedic. She flees into the woods after escaping.

== Cast ==
- Lindsey Haun as Tara
- Max Kasch as Troy
- Jack Huston as Jake
- Robert Hoffman as Bluto
- Maya Hazen as Lisa
- Alice Greczyn as Holly
- Don Wycherley as Ernie
- Sean McGinley as Bernie
- David McGinley as Dale
- Toby Sedgwick as Black Brother
- André Pollack as The Dog
- Jack Gleeson as Lonely Twin
  - Joe Phelan as young Lonely Twin
- Mike Carbery as Paramedic
- Anna Tikhonova as Mysterious Woman 1
- Goranna McDonald as Mysterious Woman 2
- Berry Murphy as Lonely Twin's Brother
- Joe Murphy as Feral Boy
- Stuart Rankin as Extra

== Production ==
An Irish, Danish, and British co-production, Shrooms was shot over a period of seven weeks in April and May 2006 in locations including Gosford Park, County Armagh, Northern Ireland and Rossmore Forest Park in County Monaghan, Ireland.

== Reception ==
Rotten Tomatoes, a review aggregator, gave it a rating of 22% based on 18 reviews from critics. Derek Elly of Variety described the film as "A shake-'n'-bake slasher movie that shows just how difficult it is to do effective, modestly budgeted horror". Séamus Leonard wrote in Raidió Teilifís Éireann's review, "The film definitely looks the part, but is hollow in virtually every other department." Leonard said the film may play better to non-Irish audiences, but viewers in Ireland will likely find it unintentionally funny. Writing for The Irish Times, Donald Clarke said the film has "some elegant compositions" but seems assembled from other recent horror films.

== See also ==
- List of films featuring hallucinogens
