= Atonement (soundtrack) =

2007 soundtrack album by Dario Marianelli

Soundtrack album by Dario Marianelli
- Released: 4 December 2007
- Recorded: 2007
- Genre: Classical
- Length: 50:28
- Label: Decca Records
- Producer: Dario Marianelli

Atonement (Music from the Motion Picture) is the soundtrack album from the 2007 film Atonement, composed by Dario Marianelli and performed by the English Chamber Orchestra, French classical pianist Jean-Yves Thibaudet, and cellist Caroline Dale. This was their second collaboration with director Joe Wright, following the soundtrack for his 2005 adaptation of Pride & Prejudice.

In addition to winning an Academy Award for Best Original Score and a Golden Globe Award for Best Original Score, Marianelli received nominations for the Broadcast Film Critics Association Award for Best Composer and the Chicago Film Critics Association Award for Original Score. Marianelli also received three awards for Film Score of the Year, Best Original Score, and Film Music Composition of the Year for "Elegy for Dunkirk" in the International Film Music Critics Association Awards.

== Composition ==
The most notable elements of the score are the piano and the typewriter, which is often directly influenced by the characters' actions: when a character stops typing on the typewriter, for example, the ticking typewriter in the score ceases.

The title of track 4, "Cee, You and Tea" is a play on the spelling of the word "cunt," which is in the letter that Robbie writes and Briony intercepts, thus setting off the most important chain of events in the film.

"Elegy for Dunkirk", which accompanies an unbroken tracking shot around the beach at Dunkirk features a diegetic performance of the hymn "Dear Lord and Father of Mankind" to the tune "Repton" by Hubert Parry.

Not included on the album is the track heard in the trailer, The Vision, written by Chris Field, and licensed through X-Ray Dog. After the release of the trailer, The Vision became one of Chris Field's and X-Ray Dog's best known pieces.

== Track listing ==
1. "Briony" (Dario Marianelli) – 1:44
2. "Robbie's Note" (Dario Marianelli) – 3:04
3. "Two Figures By a Fountain" (Dario Marianelli) – 1:15
4. "Cee, You and Tea" (Dario Marianelli) – 2:25
5. "With My Own Eyes" (Dario Marianelli) – 4:40
6. "Farewell" (Dario Marianelli) – 3:32
7. "Love Letters" (Dario Marianelli) – 3:09
8. "The Half Killed" (Dario Marianelli) – 2:09
9. "Rescue Me" (Dario Marianelli) – 3:17
10. "Elegy for Dunkirk" (Dario Marianelli) – 4:15
11. "Come Back" (Dario Marianelli) – 4:28
12. "Denouement" (Dario Marianelli) – 2:27
13. "The Cottage on the Beach" (Dario Marianelli) 3:24
14. "Atonement" (Dario Marianelli) – 5:18
15. "Suite bergamasque: Clair de lune" (Claude Debussy) – 4:52

== Personnel ==
- Dario Marianelli, composer
- English Chamber Orchestra conducted by Benjamin Wallfisch
- Jean-Yves Thibaudet, piano
- Caroline Dale, cello
- Brendan Power, harmonica
