= Blow Dry =

2001 film by Paddy Breathnach

- Theatrical release poster
- Directed by: Paddy Breathnach
- Based on: the screenplay Never Better by Simon Beaufoy
- Starring: Alan Rickman; Natasha Richardson; Rachel Griffiths; Rachael Leigh Cook; Josh Hartnett; Bill Nighy; Rosemary Harris; Heidi Klum
- Cinematography: Cian de Buitléar
- Edited by: Tony Lawson
- Production companies: Mirage Enterprises; Intermedia Films; IMF Internationale Medien und Film GmbH & Co. Produktions KG
- Distributed by: Miramax Films
- Release dates: 7 March 2001 (United States); 30 March 2001 (United Kingdom)
- Running time: 94 minutes
- Countries: United States; United Kingdom; Germany
- Language: English
- Box office: USD $830,286

Blow Dry is a 2001 romantic comedy film directed by Paddy Breathnach and based on the screenplay Never Better by Simon Beaufoy. The film stars Alan Rickman, Natasha Richardson, Rachel Griffiths, Rachael Leigh Cook, Josh Hartnett, Bill Nighy, Rosemary Harris, and Heidi Klum.

== Plot ==
Shelley Allen operates a hairdressing shop in Keighley with her domestic partner Sandra. Shelley has been battling cancer, a secret known only to Sandra and a few confidants. She receives a terminal prognosis from her oncologist and decides to hide the truth from Sandra.

When Keighley is chosen to host the British hairdressing championship, Shelley wants to participate one last time. She asks her husband Phil and her son Brian, who operate a barber shop, to join her and Sandra as a team to enter the competition. Phil rejects the proposition: ten years previously Shelley had been his partner in the competition, and she ran off with Sandra (their model) the night before the third event; Phil has never forgiven them.

Meanwhile, defending champion Raymond Robertson visits Phil to ensure that Phil is not competing. Brian is offput when Raymond belittles Phil's confidence and ability. When he is attracted to Raymond's beautiful daughter Christina, Brian offers to join Shelley's team.

Christina aspires to be a hair colourist, but lacks experience. Brian brings her to a funeral parlour where he works, where she can practice on one of the corpses after hours while Brian cuts its hair. Christina is startled when the corpse "groans" (expels trapped gas in the lungs) and flees into the street. Brian follows to console her and inadvertently allows the doors to lock behind them. The next morning the family of the deceased is displeased to find shocking pink spiky hair on their 95-year-old uncle. During the first round of the competition, Brian is cornered by the relatives of the deceased and is physically beaten.

Shelley reveals to Phil and Brian that she has terminal cancer. Phil reconsiders and agrees to coach but not to cut. After Raymond's team successfully cheats in the first round, Phil sabotages a second attempt in the second round, allowing the other top teams to narrow the gap to Raymond. Christina gains colouring experience using the sheep of the family that assaulted Brian. Brian however disowns her when he realises she is helping Raymond cheat.

The night before the third round, Sandra learns that Shelley's cancer is terminal. Angry that Shelley lied to her, Sandra quits the team. Shelley recruits one of her clients as the model for the third round and wins, moving the team into second place overall. Phil is congratulatory, but Shelley reveals that her motivation was not to win – she wanted the team effort to bond the four of them into a family before she dies. Phil agrees to participate in the final round; he also talks Sandra into rejoining the team. Christina cuts off most of her hair so that she cannot participate in her father's scheme for the final round, and she and Brian reconcile.

In the last round, Phil's novel design includes shaving Sandra's head to reveal an old scalp tattoo and applying body paint to her naked, winged body. The result snatches them the overall victory by one point. Shelley, Sandra, Phil, Brian and Christina leave the competition arm-in-arm as Keighley celebrates a hometown winner.

== Cast ==
- Alan Rickman as Phil Allen
- Natasha Richardson as Shelley Allen
- Rachel Griffiths as Sandra
- Josh Hartnett as Brian Allen
- Bill Nighy as Raymond "Ray" Robertson
- Rachael Leigh Cook as Christina Robertson
- Hugh Bonneville as Louis
- Rosemary Harris as Daisy
- Heidi Klum as Jasmine
- Peter McDonald as Vincent

== Production and release ==
Blow Dry was released in American cinemas on 9 March 2001. The UK premiere was on 30 March 2001 in Keighley Batley and Dewsbury, West Yorkshire, where the story was set and filmed. Releases in other countries followed between May 2001 and May 2002, including on 21 June 2001 in the Czech Republic, 26 July 2001 in Germany and 18 April 2002 in Hungary.

The release of Blow Dry was delayed when The Big Tease, a similarly themed film about the world champion hair competition, came out in 2000.

== Reception ==
=== Box office ===
Blow Dry opened in North America on 9 March 2001, grossing over US$240,000 in 157 theaters on its opening weekend, and ended its 24-day theatrical run in North America with total grosses of $830,286. It went on to gross a further $10,205 in the Czech Republic (as of 8 July 2001), $164,372 in Germany (as of 12 August 2001) and $17,940 in Hungary (as of 24 April 2002).

=== Critical response ===
On Rotten Tomatoes the film has an approval rating of 19% based on reviews from 64 critics, with an average rating of 4.4 out of 10. The site's critical consensus reads, "Heartwarming, but over-the-top and too formulaic." On Metacritic, the film has a weighted average score of 38 out of 100, based on reviews from 19 critics, indicating "generally unfavorable" reviews.

Emma Cochrane of Empire gave it 2 out of 5 and wrote: "While it's hard to be mean about a film that has such obvious good intentions - in between the hair show it tackles an un-clichéd lesbian relationship, cancer, young love and the triumph of the underdog - it's also a tough call to praise something which is so lame and unfunny." A. O. Scott of The New York Times wrote "Seems both overplotted and underimagined, though there is at least some creativity and a dose of realism, evident in the hairstyles themselves." Robert Koehler of Variety wrote: "It's not a good hair day" and called the film a "limp comedy-drama."
