= The Young Person's Guide to the Orchestra =

1945 orchestral work by Benjamin Britten

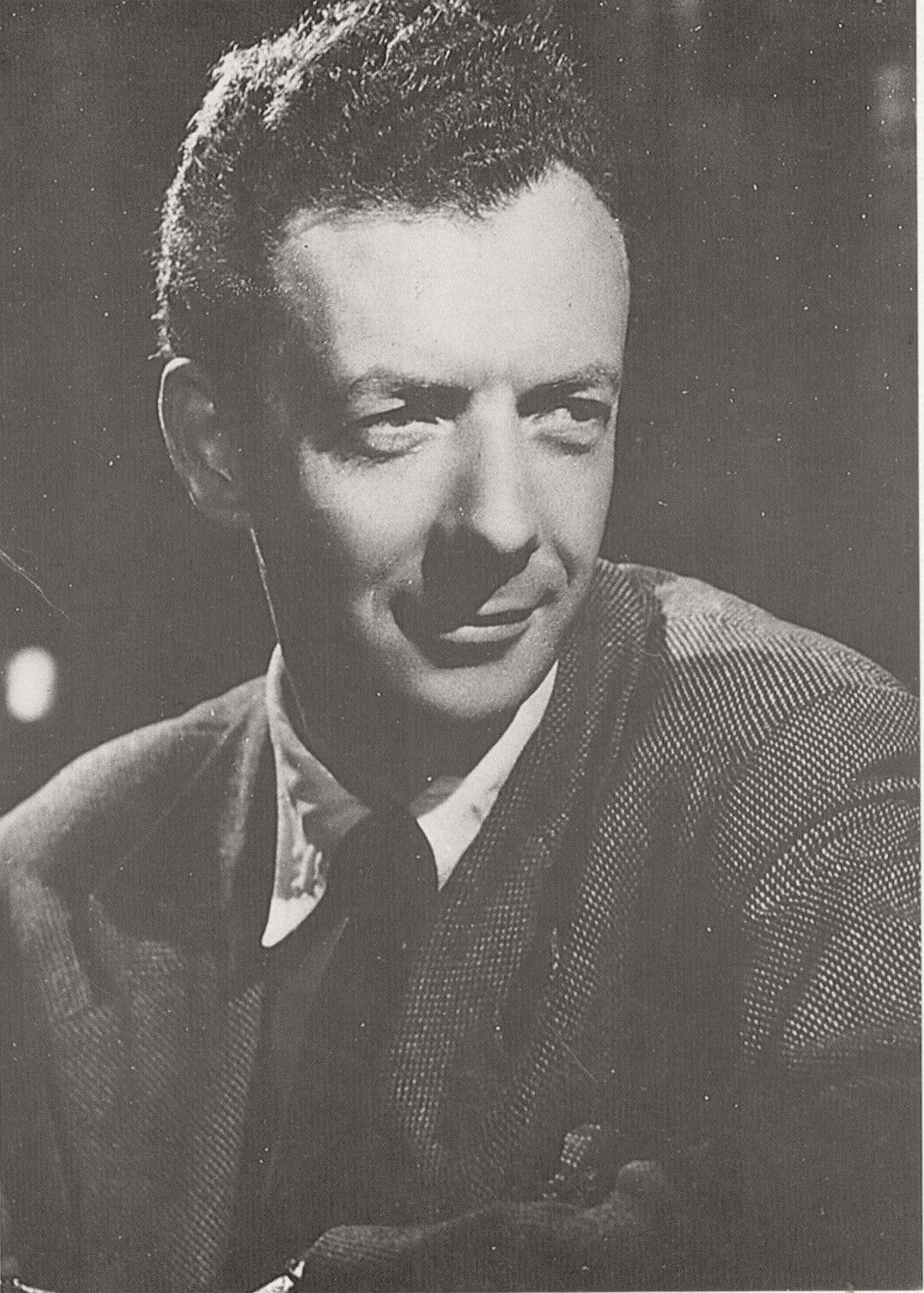
Benjamin Britten in the 1940s

The Young Person's Guide to the Orchestra, Op. 34, is a 1945 musical composition by Benjamin Britten with a subtitle Variations and Fugue on a Theme of Purcell. It was based on the second movement (a rondeau) of the Abdelazer suite. It was originally commissioned for the British educational documentary film called Instruments of the Orchestra released on 29 November 1946, directed by Muir Mathieson and featuring the London Symphony Orchestra conducted by Malcolm Sargent; Sargent also conducted the concert première on 15 October 1946 with the Liverpool Philharmonic in the Philharmonic Hall, Liverpool, England.

== Instrumentation ==
The Young Person's Guide to the Orchestra is scored for symphony orchestra consisting of the following instruments:

- Woodwinds: piccolo, two flutes, two oboes, two clarinets in B♭ and A, two bassoons
- Brass: four horns in F, two trumpets in C, two trombones, one bass trombone, one bass tuba
- Percussion: timpani, bass drum, cymbals, tambourine, triangle, snare drum, woodblock, xylophone, castanets, tamtam, whip
- Strings: harp, first and second violins, violas, cellos, double basses

== Structure ==
The work is based on the Rondeau from Henry Purcell's incidental music to Aphra Behn's Abdelazer, and is structured, in accordance with the plan of the original documentary film, as a way of showing off the tone colours and capacities of the various sections of the orchestra.

In the introduction, the theme is initially played by the entire orchestra, then by each major family of instruments of the orchestra: first the woodwinds, then the brass, then the strings, and finally by the percussion. Each variation then features a particular instrument in-depth, generally moving through each family from the higher-pitched instruments to the lower-pitched (the order of the families is slightly different from the introduction). For example, the first variation features the piccolo and flutes; each member of the woodwind family then gets a variation, ending with the bassoon. The woodwinds are followed by the strings, brass, and finally the percussion.

After the whole orchestra has been taken apart in this way, it is reassembled using an original fugue which starts with the piccolo, followed by all the woodwinds, strings, brass and percussion in turn. Once everyone has entered, the brass are re-introduced (with a strike on the tamtam) with Purcell's original melody.

External audio
- Performed by Benjamin Britten and the London Symphony Orchestra
- Theme
- Variation A
- Variation B
- Variation C
- Variation D
- Variation E
- Variation F
- Variation G
- Variation H
- Variation I
- Variation J
- Variation K
- Variation L
- Variation M
- Fugue

The sections of the piece and instruments introduced by the variations are as follows.

Theme
Allegro maestoso e largamente
Tutti (D minor), woodwinds (F major), brass (E♭ major), strings (G minor), then percussion (written in A major)
Variation A
Presto
Flutes and piccolo
Variation B
Lento
Oboes
Variation C
Moderato
Clarinets
Variation D
Allegro alla marcia
Bassoons
Variation E
Brillante: alla polacca
Violins
Variation F
Meno mosso
Violas
Variation G
Lusingando
Cellos
Variation H
Cominciando lento ma poco a poco accel. al Allegro
Double basses
Variation I
Maestoso
Harp
Variation J
L'istesso tempo
Horns
Variation K
Vivace
Trumpets
Variation L
Allegro pomposo
Trombones and tuba
Variation M
Moderato
Percussion (timpani; bass drum and cymbals; tambourine and triangle; snare drum and woodblock; xylophone; castanets and tam-tam; whip; percussion tutti)
Fugue
Allegro molto

== Narration ==
The narration for the documentary film was written by Eric Crozier, the producer of the first production of Britten's opera Peter Grimes, and is sometimes spoken by the conductor or a separate speaker during performance of the piece. The composer also arranged a version without narration. The one without narration is more often recorded. The commentary often differs among recordings.

A new narration was written by Simon Butteriss for the Aldeburgh Festival and broadcast live by CBBC presenter Johny Pitts with the BBC Symphony Orchestra for the Britten 100 celebrations in 2013.

Comedian and author John Hodgman wrote a new narration of The Young Person's Guide to the Orchestra in 2015 for a series of performances with the Boston Pops Orchestra.

== Jazz orchestra versions ==
Duncan Lamont wrote an equivalent suite of variations (using the same Purcell theme) for jazz orchestra and narrator, The Young Person's Guide to the Jazz Orchestra. Mike Westbrook's After Smith's Hotel, subtitled The Young Person's Guide to the Jazz Orchestra, was commissioned by the Snape Maltings Foundation and performed there in October 1983.

== See also ==
- List of variations on a theme by another composer
