= Chris Field (composer) =

American singer-songwriter

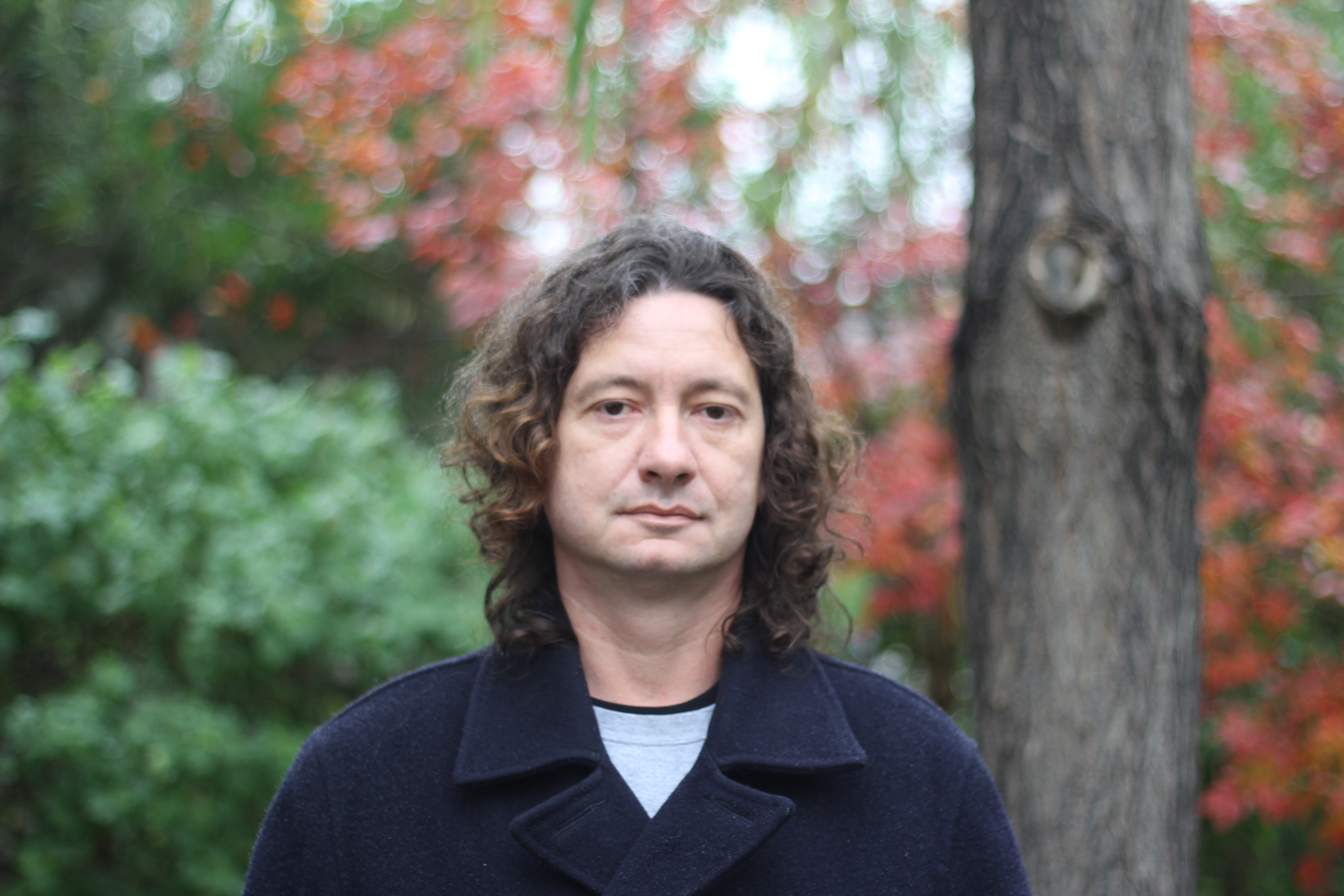
- Field in 2013
- Born: United States
- Occupation(s): Singer/songwriter, composer, and musician
- Known for: Theatrical trailers; Album Producer
- Spouse: Katie O'Brien Field
- Website: www.chrisfieldmusic.com

Chris Field is a Los Angeles-based composer, songwriter, producer and musician, best known as a founding member of X-Ray Dog. He was raised in the San Fernando Valley, and played guitar in Los Angeles for groups among multiple genres including electric guitar, jazz, and rock music. He learned how to compose music by inputting compositions from Ludwig van Beethoven and Sergei Prokofiev into his computer. Through his music associates, he became acquainted with two friends who started X-Ray Dog, and he began to contribute musical compositions to this company. Field also works with Extreme Music, and through them, Field's music has been placed in numerous television shows. In December 2014, a part of Field's catalogue was acquired by BMG Chrysalis, with whom he continues to work, on major film and television campaigns.

Field's work as a musical composer for movie theatrical trailers has included Valerian, X-Men, Harry Potter and the Philosopher's Stone, XXX, Austin Powers in Goldmember, Terminator 3: Rise of the Machines, Hotel Rwanda, Kinsey, Pirates of the Caribbean: The Curse of the Black Pearl, Pirates of the Caribbean: Dead Man's Chest, and The Lord of the Rings: The Fellowship of the Ring, as well as countless television shows. His first contribution to a film trailer was for The Full Monty.

Field is the composer of "Gothic Power", which developed an international cult following. "Gothic Power" was the main theme for the trailer for The Lord of the Rings film series; this piece was later in the trailer for Steven Spielberg's War of the Worlds and in the trailer for a film within a film in a sequence for Ben Stiller's movie Tropic Thunder. The piece was internationally published by X-Ray Dog.

Field became recognized for having started a new direction in cinematic music. In 2014, Field's composition "Acts of Courage" was released on the album, This Is Epic Music, Volume I, through Imperativa Records, via iTunes and on CD. The album notes state that the piece "Gothic Power", written by Field in 1999, started a new direction in cinematic music that came to be identified as epic music. Through this album, by Imperativa Records, Field's trailer compositions became available for sale to the public for the first time. Field's catalogue of film trailer music has since become available for sale to the public on iTunes through X-Ray Dog.

== Albums ==
Field expects to release a rock album in 2026. In 2020, Field released album "Beneath the Sun", an orchestral work which includes new music derived from his most popular film trailer themes, available on iTunes and all major platforms. In 2015, Field released album "Personal Elegy", a classic rock, vintage rock, and retro seventies work. This album is not available to the public but is for license only. The track "Movin'", has been licensed for a number of major television shows.

Field co-produced, recorded, mixed and mastered the jazz album "Distance Traveled", in 2014, for David Becker Tribune. This album is available for sale in digital format on iTunes, cdbaby, and Amazon.

Field's trailer composition, "Acts of Courage" was made available to the public, for sale for the first time on the album "This Is Epic Music, Volume I", through Imperativa Records, in 2014. Prior to that time, Field's trailer compositions were never made available for sale. Since that time, X-Ray Dog has released its catalogue of Field's music to the public for sale. In 2017, the pieces "Act of Courage" and "The Vision", respectively, reached the number 1 and number 9 positions for top sales in the X-Ray Dog catalogue on iTunes.

Field released his debut album, "Sub-Conscious" in 2006; it was made available on iTunes, CD Baby, Amazon.com, and for retail sale. It received a positive reception, and his song "Floating" from the album reached spot number eight in the New Age genre for iTunes in Luxembourg on July 7, 2011. Sub-Conscious was awarded Best Neo-Classical Album, 2006, by New Age Reporter.

== Early life and family ==
Field was raised in the San Fernando Valley. He played guitar in Los Angeles for a period of time as a young man. He contributed to productions including electric guitar, jazz, and rock music. He acquired his first computer about 1998, wherein he began to learn musical composition and production. He experimented by taking compositions from Ludwig van Beethoven and Sergei Prokofiev, and inputting them electronically into his computer. He noted in a 2006 interview that his wife Katie O'Brien Field helped with promotion of his music.

== Career ==
=== Film trailers ===
He met associate Mitch Lijewski through his guitar playing, and was introduced to Tim Stithem. Lijewski and Stithem started X-Ray Dog and he started contributing musical composition through work with this firm. Field has worked as a composer for theatrical trailers for films. His trailer musical composition work has included films such as X-Men, Harry Potter and the Philosopher's Stone, XXX, Austin Powers in Goldmember, Terminator 3: Rise of the Machines, Hotel Rwanda, Kinsey, Pirates of the Caribbean: The Curse of the Black Pearl, Pirates of the Caribbean: Dead Man's Chest, and The Lord of the Rings: The Fellowship of the Ring.

His first musical composition for a movie trailer was for the film The Full Monty; he worked on this piece with friend Mark Griskey who was a fellow composer at X-Ray Dog. Field explained his thought process on the film trailer: "A trailer, is like a one-minute or whatever, mini movie that's got to have its own feeling and form to it — trailer music is very intense and gets right to the point. It sounds simple, but it's taken me some years to really figure out. I call it 'rock and roll orchestra' because it's got orchestral elements and, sometimes, a choir, but it also has a lot of rock elements like the drive, the drums and the way it just builds and builds."

His musical composition piece "Gothic Power" was used in trailers for The Lord of the Rings film series. The debut of the first trailer in theaters was quite popular with fans. Subsequently, the piece was utilized by Ben Stiller in a fictional movie trailer for a film within a film in Tropic Thunder. He composed a piece called "The Vision" which incorporated string music; it was utilized for the end of the trailer for the 2007 film Atonement. Although uncredited on the film, Field's composition, "The Journey" is the music for the end credits of the 2006 DVD release of the movie The Secret.

=== Solo artist ===
Field released his debut album, Sub-Conscious, in 2006. It featured orchestral music from the Northwest Sinfonia. He created the album as a way to branch out from theatrical trailer composition into work as a solo artist. Field utilizes Logic Pro and MIDI for his musical composition; after this process he delivers these files along with an MP3 to the individual in charge of orchestration, who uses Finale software to convert this to musical notation. The album was made available on iTunes, CD Baby, Amazon.com, and for retail sale].

The album received a positive review from Jamie Bonk of ZoneMusicReporter.com, who commented: "As far as debut albums are concerned, composer/producer/multi- instrumentalist Chris Field's Sub-Conscious is an outstanding record: great compositions and arrangements, first-rate performances and most importantly a defined point of view.".

Sub-Conscious has since become a top seller and editor's pick in two categories on the cdbaby platform, with citations on the site as top seller editor's pick in both the Ambient and Neo-Classical genres at https://store.cdbaby.com/Picks/240 for Ambient and https://store.cdbaby.com/Picks/586 for Neo-Classical.

== Discography ==
Track listing

All music is composed by Chris Field.

Sub-Conscious
No.	Title	Length
1.	"Floating"	3:33
2.	"Ave Maria"	5:34
3.	"Five"	6:07
4.	"Days"	4:33
5.	"D&A"	5:48
6.	"Blue"	14:08
7.	"Mother"	4:22
8.	"Sub-Conscious"	5:29
Total length:		49:34

== Filmography ==
The following is a complete list of music Field has composed.

=== Film ===
Year	Film	Role	Director	Studio
1997	The Full Monty	Composer: Theatrical trailer	Peter Cattaneo	20th Century Fox
1999	Pokémon: The Movie 2000	Composer: Theatrical trailer	Kunihiko Yuyama	Warner Bros.
2000	The Legend of Bagger Vance	Composer: Theatrical trailer	Robert Redford	DreamWorks Pictures
2000	Meet the Parents	Composer: Theatrical trailer	Jay Roach	Universal Pictures
2000	The Replacements	Composer: Theatrical trailer	Howard Deutch	Warner Bros.
2000	X-Men	Composer: Theatrical trailer	Bryan Singer	20th Century Fox
2000	The Whole Nine Yards	Composer: Theatrical trailer	Jonathan Lynn	Warner Bros. Pictures
2001	Black Hawk Down	Composer: Theatrical trailer	Ridley Scott	Columbia Pictures
2001	Enemy at the Gates	Composer: Theatrical trailer	Jean-Jacques Annaud	Paramount Pictures
2001	Gosford Park	Composer: Theatrical trailer	Robert Altman	USA Films
2001	Harry Potter and the Philosopher's Stone	Composer: Theatrical trailer	Chris Columbus	Warner Bros. Pictures
2001	The Lord of the Rings: The Fellowship of the Ring	Composer: Theatrical trailer	Peter Jackson	New Line Cinema
2001	Pokémon 4Ever	Composer: Theatrical trailer	Kunihiko Yuyama	Miramax Films
2002	Austin Powers in Goldmember	Composer: Theatrical trailer	Jay Roach	New Line Cinema
2002	Gangs of New York	Composer: Theatrical trailer	Martin Scorsese	Miramax Films
2002	The Hours	Composer: Theatrical trailer	Stephen Daldry	Miramax Films
2002	K-19: The Widowmaker	Composer: Theatrical trailer	Kathryn Bigelow	Paramount Pictures
2002	The Lord of the Rings: The Two Towers	Composer: Theatrical trailer	Peter Jackson	New Line Cinema
2002	The Magdalene Sisters	Composer: Theatrical trailer	Peter Mullan	Miramax Films
2002	Pokémon Heroes	Composer: Theatrical trailer	Kunihiko Yuyama	Miramax Films
2002	Red Dragon	Composer: Theatrical trailer	Brett Ratner	Universal Pictures
2002	Road to Perdition	Composer: Theatrical trailer	Sam Mendes	DreamWorks Pictures
2002	XXX	Composer: Theatrical trailer	Rob Cohen	Columbia Pictures
2003	Agent Cody Banks	Composer: Theatrical trailer	Harald Zwart	Metro-Goldwyn-Mayer
2003	Cold Mountain	Composer: Theatrical trailer	Anthony Minghella	Miramax Films
2003	Daredevil	Composer: Theatrical trailer	Mark Steven Johnson	20th Century Fox
2003	Elf	Composer: Theatrical trailer	Jon Favreau	New Line Cinema
2003	House of 1000 Corpses	Composer: Theatrical trailer	Rob Zombie	Lions Gate Films
2003	Master and Commander: The Far Side of the World	Composer: Theatrical trailer	Peter Weir	20th Century Fox
2003	Old School	Composer: Theatrical trailer	Todd Phillips	DreamWorks Pictures
2003	Pirates of the Caribbean: The Curse of the Black Pearl	Composer: Theatrical trailer	Gore Verbinski	Walt Disney Pictures
2003	Seabiscuit	Composer: Theatrical trailer	Gary Ross	Universal Studios
2003	Terminator 3: Rise of the Machines	Composer: Theatrical trailer	Jonathan Mostow	Sony Pictures
2004	The Aviator	Composer: Theatrical trailer	Martin Scorsese	Miramax Films
2004	Hellboy	Composer: Theatrical trailer	Guillermo del Toro	Columbia TriStar
2004	Hotel Rwanda	Composer: Theatrical trailer	Terry George	Metro-Goldwyn-Mayer
2004	Kinsey	Composer: Theatrical trailer	Bill Condon	Fox Searchlight Pictures
2005	Wallace & Gromit: The Curse of the Were-Rabbit	Composer: Theatrical trailer	Nick Park and Steve Box	DreamWorks
2005	War of the Worlds	Composer: Theatrical trailer	Steven Spielberg	Paramount Pictures/DreamWorks
2006	Night at the Museum	Composer: Theatrical trailer	Shawn Levy	20th Century Fox
2006	Pirates of the Caribbean: Dead Man's Chest	Composer: Theatrical trailer	Gore Verbinski	Walt Disney Pictures
2007	Atonement	Composer: Theatrical trailer	Joe Wright	Focus Features
2007	Beowulf	Composer: Theatrical trailer	Robert Zemeckis	Paramount Pictures
2007	Into the Wild	Composer: Theatrical trailer	Sean Penn	Paramount Vantage
2007	Pirates of the Caribbean: At World's End	Composer: Theatrical trailer	Gore Verbinski	Walt Disney Pictures
2008	Changeling	Composer: Theatrical trailer	Clint Eastwood	Universal Pictures
2008	The Duchess	Composer: Theatrical trailer	Saul Dibb	Paramount Vantage
2008	Ghost Town	Composer: Theatrical trailer	David Koepp	Paramount Pictures
2008	Quarantine	Composer: Theatrical trailer	John Erick Dowdle	Columbia TriStar
2008	Stop-Loss	Composer: Theatrical trailer	Kimberly Peirce	Paramount Pictures
2008	Valkyrie	Composer: Theatrical trailer	Bryan Singer	Metro-Goldwyn-Mayer
2008	WALL-E	Composer: Theatrical trailer	Andrew Stanton	Walt Disney Studios Motion Pictures
2009	The Imaginarium of Doctor Parnassus	Composer: Theatrical trailer	Terry Gilliam	Lions Gate
2009	Monsters vs. Aliens	Composer: Commercial preview, Super Bowl XLIII	Conrad Vernon and Rob Letterman	Paramount Pictures
2010	Alice in Wonderland	Composer: Theatrical trailer	Tim Burton	Walt Disney Pictures
2010	Nanny McPhee and the Big Bang	Composer: Theatrical trailer	Susanna White	Universal Pictures
2010	Yogi Bear	Composer: Theatrical trailer	Eric Brevig	Warner Bros.
2011	Cowboys & Aliens	Composer: Theatrical trailer	Jon Favreau	Universal Pictures
2011	Immortals	Composer: Theatrical trailer	Tarsem Singh	Relativity Media
2011	The Twilight Saga: Breaking Dawn – Part 1	Composer: Theatrical trailer	Bill Condon	Summit Entertainment
2012	Men in Black 3	Composer: Theatrical trailer	Barry Sonnenfeld	Columbia Pictures
2012	Parental Guidance	Composer: Theatrical trailer	Andy Fickman	20th Century Fox
2013	Jack the Giant Killer	Composer: Theatrical trailer	Bryan Singer	New Line Cinema
2013	This Is The End	Composer: Theatrical trailer	Evan Goldberg	Columbia Tristar
2013	Romeo and Juliet	Composer: Theatrical trailer	Carlo Carlei	Relativity Media
2013	Monsters University	Composer: Theatrical trailer	Dan Scanlon	Buena Vista Pictures
2014	Monuments Men	Composer: Theatrical trailer	George Clooney	Columbia Tristar
2014	Guardians of the Galaxy	Composer: Theatrical trailer	James Gunn	Buena Vista Pictures
2014	E-Team	Composer: Theatrical trailer	Katy Chevigny/Ross Kauffman	Netflix
2015–present	BMG/X-Ray Dog	Composer: Theatrical/Television trailers	International/Domestic	Various

=== Video games ===
Year	Game	Role	Developer	Company
2004	Ultima X: Odyssey	Composer, orchestral score	Origin Systems	Electronic Arts
2010	Lord of Ultima	Composer	EA Phenomic	Electronic Arts

== See also ==
- Atonement (soundtrack)
- Neoclassical (New Age)
- Trailer music
- X-Ray Dog
