= Paddy Breathnach =

Irish film director and producer

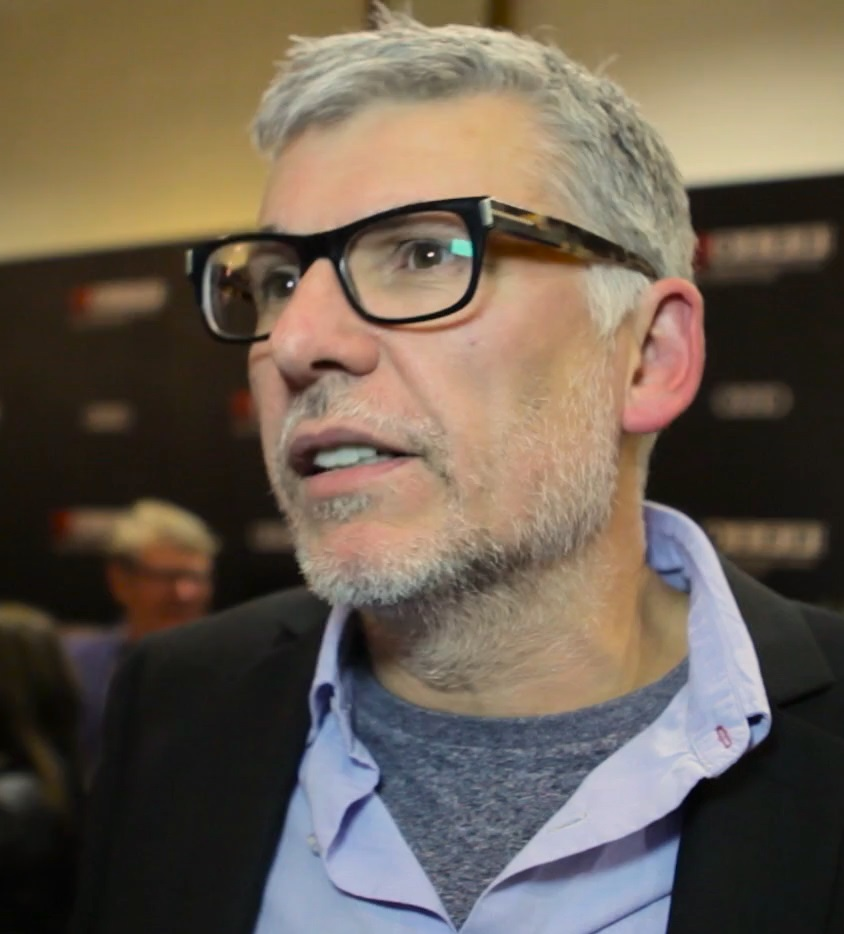
- Paddy Breathnach in 2016
- Born: 1964 (age 61–62); Dublin, Ireland
- Occupations: Film director, television director, producer
- Years active: 1994–present

Paddy Breathnach (born 1964) is an Irish director and producer. He has directed Man About Dog, Blow Dry and Shrooms. He was also involved in the production of The Mighty Celt and Ape. Since 2022 he has been directing the comedy-drama series The Dry.

== Filmography ==
- Ailsa (1994)
- The Long Way Home (1995)
- I Went Down (1997)
- Blow Dry (2001)
- Man About Dog (2004)
- Shrooms (2006)
- Freakdog (2008)
- Viva (2015)
- Rosie (2018)
- The Dry (2022–present)

== Awards and nominations ==
Breathnach received awards at the Thessaloniki Film Festival, the San Sebastián International Film Festival and the Bogotá Film Festival. He won ADL Stand Up Award at Santa Barbara International Film Festival in 2016.

== See also ==
- Breathnach
