= Pride & Prejudice (soundtrack) =

Film score by Dario Marianelli
- Released: November 15, 2005 (U.S.)
- Genre: Classical
- Length: 41:22
- Label: Decca Records
- Producer: Nick Angel

Dario Marianelli chronology
Sauf le respect que je vous dois (2005)	Pride & Prejudice (2005)	The Return (2006)

Pride & Prejudice (Music from the Motion Picture) is the soundtrack to the 2005 film of the same name and was composed by Dario Marianelli and performed by Jean-Yves Thibaudet (piano) and the English Chamber Orchestra. The movie Pride & Prejudice is a screen adaptation of the 1813 novel Pride and Prejudice by Jane Austen.

Marianelli received an Oscar nomination for Best Achievement in Music Written for Motion Pictures, Original Score and two World Soundtrack Academy nominations.

"A Postcard To Henry Purcell" is based on a theme from Henry Purcell's incidental music for Abdelazar, that was also used by Benjamin Britten in The Young Person's Guide to the Orchestra.

== Background ==
The relationship between Italian composer Dario Marianelli and movie director Joe Wright began when Paul Webster, who had worked with Marianelli on the 2001 film The Warrior, introduced him to Wright. In their first conversation, Marianelli and Wright discussed the early piano sonatas of Ludwig van Beethoven, which "became a point of reference" and "starting point" for the original score. In addition to Beethoven, pieces such as "Meryton Townhall" and "The Militia Marches In" (featuring the flute) were inspired by the film's period, with the intention that they could conceivably have been heard during that time. "Meryton Townhall" and "Another Dance" contained actual dance cues that were fitting for the late eighteenth century. According to music critic William Ruhlmann, Marianelli's score had a "strong Romantic flavour to accompany the familiar romantic plot".

Multiple scenes feature actors playing pianos, forcing Marianelli to complete several of the pieces before filming began. According to him, "Those pieces already contained the seeds of what I developed later on into the score, when I abandoned historical correctness for a more intimate and emotional treatment of the story". Marianelli was not present when the actors played his music due to the birth of his second daughter. The soundtrack featured French pianist Jean-Yves Thibaudet, whom Wright considered one of the greatest pianists in the world. Thibaudet was accompanied by the English Chamber Orchestra. The soundtrack ultimately contained seventeen instrumental tracks of music organised in a different way from the film.

It was the first of five collaborations between Marianelli and Wright.

== Track listing ==
1. "Dawn"
2. "Stars and Butterflies"
3. "The Living Sculptures of Pemberley"
4. "Meryton Townhall"
5. "The Militia Marches In"
6. "Georgiana"
7. "Arrival At Netherfield"
8. "A Postcard to Henry Purcell"
9. "Liz on Top of the World"
10. "Leaving Netherfield"
11. "Another Dance"
12. "The Secret Life of Daydreams"
13. "Darcy's Letter"
14. "Can't Slow Down"
15. "Your Hands Are Cold"
16. "Mrs. Darcy"
17. "Credits"

== Certifications ==
Region	Certification	Certified units/sales
United States (RIAA)	Gold	500,000^{‡}
^{‡} Sales+streaming figures based on certification alone.

== Awards and nominations ==
=== Academy Awards ===
- Best Achievement in Music Written for Motion Pictures, Original Score

=== European Film Awards ===
- Best Composer

=== World Soundtrack Awards ===
- Best Original Soundtrack of the Year
- Soundtrack Composer of the Year

== Certifications ==
Region	Certification	Certified units/sales
United Kingdom (BPI)	Silver	60,000^{‡}
^{‡} Sales+streaming figures based on certification alone.
