= Abdelazer =

1676 play

- Original language: English
- Written by: Aphra Behn
- Genre: Tragedy

Premiere
- Date: 3 July 1676
- Place: Dorset Garden Theatre, London

Abdelazer; or, The Moor's Revenge (/æbdɛləˈzɛər/ or /æbdəˈlɑːzə/) is a 1676 play by Aphra Behn, an adaptation of the c. 1600 tragedy Lust's Dominion. It is Behn's only tragic play.

== Plot ==
Abdelazer is a captive Moor living at the court of King Philip of Spain, who had killed Abdelazer's father some years earlier. Abdelazer seeks revenge, and becomes the lover of the Queen. Together, they poison King Phillip, and also murder the young King Ferdinand.

Abdelazer and the Queen try to disinherit Prince Philip, the rightful heir. Another Moor, Osmin, warns the Prince and Cardinal Mendozo to flee. During subsequent battles, Mendozo (who is in love with the Queen) abandons Philip and is even persuaded falsely to admit to being Philip's father.

Abdelazer betrays the Queen and has her murdered by one of his henchmen. He courts and tries to rape Princess Leonora (she is saved by Osmin), but rapidly falls from power. The Queen is killed, and Abdelazer is captured with Osmin's help. Mendozo repents, Philip ascends the throne, and Abdelazer is killed.

== Comparison with source material ==
Aphra Behn relies on Thomas Dekker's 1600 play Lust's Dominion for her plot. Behn's version of the Queen is more powerful, domineering and unrepentant than her counterpart in Lust's Dominion.

Lusťs Dominion relies on the racist stereotype of the lustful, scheming, and bloodthirsty Moor, and closed with the new King Philip ordering the expulsion of all the Moors from Spain because of their supposed wickedness. However, Behn minimises and complicates this stereotype. She gives the character of Osmin a larger and more positive role, which helps 'to balance the villainous Abdelazer' and makes the most evil of Abdelazer's henchmen white.

== Reception ==
The earliest recorded performance of the play was on 3 July 1676 at the Dorset Garden Theatre in London. Staged by the Duke's Company the cast included Thomas Betterton as Abdelazer, Henry Harris as Ferdinand, William Smith as Philip, Matthew Medbourne as Mendozo, John Crosby as Alonzo, Henry Norris as Roderigo, Thomas Percival as Osmin, Mary Lee as Isbaella, Mary Betterton as Florella and Margaret Osborne as Elvira.

Abdelazer flopped in 1695, and thereafter disappeared from the stage, but its influence survived in Edward Young's 1721 tragedy The Revenge.

== Music ==
The composer Henry Purcell wrote incidental music (Z 570) (Note: "Z" is Franklin B. Zimmerman's catalogue of Purcell's works.) for a revival in the summer of 1695, with movements:

1. Ouverture
2. Rondeau
3. Air
4. Air
5. Minuet
6. Air
7. Jig
8. Hornpipe
9. Air
10. A song entitled: "Lucinda Is Bewitching Fair"

The rondeau was used by Benjamin Britten as the theme for his set of variations The Young Person's Guide to the Orchestra (1946). It was also used as the closing theme of the television series The First Churchills (1969), as the intro song for Intellivision video game Thunder Castle (1986), and may be heard as dancing music at the Netherfield ball in the 2005 production of Pride and Prejudice. The Britten arrangement is used as a recurrent motif in the 2012 film Moonrise Kingdom.

The complete incidental music has been recorded several times, most notably in 1976, performed by the Academy of Ancient Music conducted by Christopher Hogwood as part of their complete cycle of Purcell's theatre music on L'Oiseau-Lyre.
