= Dario Marianelli =

Italian film composer

- Born: Pisa, Italy
- Genres: Film score, ballet, theatre, concert music
- Occupations: Composer; music producer
- Years active: 1994–present

Dario Marianelli is an Italian composer. He has collaborated with several filmmakers including Paddy Breathnach, Joe Wright, and Travis Knight. He has continued to write concert, theatre and ballet music.

== Early life ==
Marianelli was born in Pisa, Italy. He studied in Florence with David Kimball (himself a pupil of Rosario Scalero), and in 1990 he moved to London. After a year as a postgraduate composer at the Guildhall School of Music studying with Francis Shaw he took up a three-year postgraduate program at the National Film and Television School in London, from which he graduated in 1997. While there, he also undertook diverse projects, composing for concerts, contemporary ballet and theatre productions.

== Career ==
Marianelli had already written scores for several films and TV projects, including movies such as Ailsa and Pandaemonium, when director Joe Wright contacted him about scoring his 2005 film Pride & Prejudice. He subsequently composed for Wright's films Atonement, The Soloist, Anna Karenina and Darkest Hour.

In 2018 he composed the score for Bumblebee, the sixth installment in the Transformers film series. It was his second score for director Travis Knight, after Kubo and the Two Strings.

== Awards and recognitions ==
In 2008, Marianelli won the Academy Award for Original Music Score and Golden Globe Award for Best Original Score for Atonement. He has also been nominated for Academy Awards for Pride & Prejudice and Anna Karenina.

== Film scores ==
Year	Film	Director	Awards & nominations
1994	Ailsa	Paddy Breathnach	
1995	The Long Way Home	Paddy Breathnach	
1997	The Sheep Thief	Asif Kapadia	
1997	I Went Down	Paddy Breathnach	
1999	Preserve	Victoria Harwood	
1999	The Funeral of the Last Gypsy King	Jane Rogoyska	
1999	Southpaw: The Francis Barrett Story	Liam McGrath	
2000	Being Considered	Jonathan Newman	
2000	Pandaemonium	Julien Temple	
2001	Happy Now?	Philippa Cousins	
2001	The Man Who Bought Mustique	Joseph Bullman	
2001	The Warrior	Asif Kapadia	
2002	The Visitor	Victoria Harwood	
2002	Blood Strangers	Jon Jones	
2002	In This World	Michael Winterbottom	
2003	I Capture the Castle	Tim Fywell	
2003	This Little Life	Sarah Gavron	
2003	September	Max Färberböck	
2003	The Bypass	Amit Kumar	
2003	Cheeky	David Thewlis	
2004	Passer By	David Morrissey	
2005	The Brothers Grimm	Terry Gilliam	
2005	Burnt Out	Fabienne Godet	
2005	Pride & Prejudice	Joe Wright	Nominated — Academy Award for Best Original Score; Nominated — World Soundtrack Award for Best Original Score of the Year; Nominated — World Soundtrack Award for Soundtrack Composer of the Year; Nominated — European Film Award for Best Composer
2005	Shooting Dogs	Michael Caton-Jones	
2006	V for Vendetta	James McTeigue	
2006	The Return	Asif Kapadia	
2006	Opal Dream	Peter Cattaneo	
2006	We Are Together	Paul Taylor	
2007	Atonement	Joe Wright	Academy Award for Best Original Score; Golden Globe Award for Best Original Score; International Film Music Critics Award for Score of the Year; Nominated — Broadcast Film Critics Association Award for Best Composer; Nominated — Chicago Film Critics Association Award for Best Original Score; Nominated — Satellite Award for Best Original Score; Nominated — BAFTA Award for Best Film Music
2007	Far North	Asif Kapadia	
2007	Goodbye Bafana	Bille August	
2007	Shrooms	Paddy Breathnach	
2007	The Brave One	Neil Jordan	
2009	The Soloist	Joe Wright	
2009	Everybody's Fine	Kirk Jones	
2009	Agora	Alejandro Amenábar	Nominated — Goya Awards for Best Original Score (Spain)
2010	Tick Tock Tale	Dean Wellins	
2010	Eat Pray Love	Ryan Murphy	
2011	Jane Eyre	Cary Joji Fukunaga	
2011	Salmon Fishing in the Yemen	Lasse Hallström	
2012	Anna Karenina	Joe Wright	Nominated — Academy Award for Best Original Score. Nominated — BAFTA Award for Best Film Music; Nominated — Golden Globe Award for Best Original Score. Nominated — Satellite Award for Best Original Score
2012	Quartet	Dustin Hoffman	
2013	Hummingbird	Steven Knight	
2013	Third Person	Paul Haggis	
2014	A Long Way Down	Pascal Chaumeil	
2014	The Boxtrolls	Graham Annable; Anthony Stacchi	Marianelli's first score for an animated film.
2015	Wild Card	Simon West	
2015	Everest	Baltasar Kormákur	
2016	Kubo and the Two Strings	Travis Knight	
2016	Ali and Nino	Asif Kapadia	
2017	Darkest Hour	Joe Wright	Nominated — BAFTA Award for Best Film Music; Nominated — Satellite Award for Best Original Score
2017	Paddington 2	Paul King	Nominated - International Film Music Critics Association for Best Original Score for a Comedy Film
2018	Bumblebee	Travis Knight	
2018	A Woman's Name	Marco Tullio Giordana	
2019	Pinocchio	Matteo Garrone	
2020	The Secret Garden	Marc Munden	
2021	A Boy Called Christmas	Gil Kenan	
2024	Ghostbusters: Frozen Empire	Gil Kenan	
2024	Federer: Twelve Final Days	Asif Kapadia; Joe Sabia	
2024	The Life Apart	Marco Tullio Giordana	
2024	Paddington in Peru	Dougal Wilson	
2026	Wildwood	Travis Knight	
2027	Gatto	Enrico Casarosa	

== Awards and nominations ==
Award	Year	Category	Project	Outcome	Ref.
Academy Award	2006	Best Original Score	Pride & Prejudice	Nominated	
Academy Award	2008	Best Original Score	Atonement	Won	
Academy Award	2013	Best Original Score	Anna Karenina	Nominated	
BAFTA Award	2008	Anthony Asquith Award for Film Music	Atonement	Nominated	
BAFTA Award	2013	Anthony Asquith Award for Film Music	Anna Karenina	Nominated	
BAFTA Award	2018	Anthony Asquith Award for Film Music	Darkest Hour	Nominated	
Golden Globe Award	2008	Best Original Score - Motion Picture	Atonement	Won	
Golden Globe Award	2013	Best Original Score - Motion Picture	Anna Karenina	Nominated	
Satellite Awards	2007	Best Original Score	Atonement	Nominated	
Satellite Awards	2012	Best Original Score	Anna Karenina	Nominated	
Satellite Awards	2017	Best Original Score	Darkest Hour	Nominated	
World Soundtrack Awards	2006	Best Original Soundtrack of the Year	Pride & Prejudice	Nominated	
World Soundtrack Awards	2006	Soundtrack Composer of the Year	Pride & Prejudice	Nominated	
World Soundtrack Awards	2008	Best Original Soundtrack of the Year	Atonement	Won	
World Soundtrack Awards	2008	Soundtrack Composer of the Year	Atonement	Nominated	
World Soundtrack Awards	2013	Best Original Film Score of the Year	Anna Karenina	Nominated	

== See also ==
- Broadcast Film Critics Association Award for Best Composer
- Chicago Film Critics Association
