= Esme Ward =

English museum professional

Esme Ward is an English museum professional with an interest in public learning and engagement.

Esme Ward was appointed as Director of Manchester Museum in April 2018. She is the first woman to hold the role in the history of the museum, which was founded in 1867. Prior to her appointment, she was Head of Learning Engagement at Manchester Museum and the Whitworth, where she led the growth of audiences and programmes, to include award-winning early years, health and culture and age friendly work. For several years, she worked alongside Maria Balshaw on the £15 million transformation of the Whitworth.

In 2016–17 she was a Fellow on the Clore Leadership Programme, exploring social and civic purpose, leadership and the future of museums. Her placement was with the Heritage Lottery Fund, exploring how to catalyse and support community heritage and activism. Her career has been driven by learning and social purpose with a longstanding commitment to make museums more inclusive and relevant to a wider audience.

She started her career at Dulwich Picture Gallery and the V&A before moving north and working as a freelance educator with the National Trust and regional museum services. In 1998 she set up the Whitworth’s education service and over the next decade, developed audiences, exhibitions and teaching at all levels. Since 2005, she has taught MA module on Creative Learning and Museology at the Institute for Cultural Practice at the University of Manchester. Her degree is in History, with an MA in French Revolutionary Culture and Theory, from the University of London.

Ward is the Strategic Lead (Culture) for Age Friendly Manchester and the Greater Manchester Ageing Hub, and writes and speaks about age-friendly culture and the social purpose and future of museums, both internationally and at home. She sits on several national boards and networks, including Age Friendly Museums Network and was one of the expert authors on the Prime Minister’s Champion Group on the Arts Guide to Dementia Friendly Culture. She is co-curator of the Arts and Health programme at the forthcoming World Health Congress 2019–20.
