= Pyrah =

Pyrah is a surname. Notable persons with that name include:

- Ervine Pyrah Mosby (1877–1916), English rugby league player
- Barbara Pyrah (1943–2016), British geologist and museum curator
- Gill Pyrah, British journalist
- Jason Pyrah (born 1969), American runner
- Rich Pyrah (born 1982), British cricketer
