= Clore Duffield Foundation =

UK charity

- Founded: 2000; 26 years ago
- Founder: Vivien Duffield
- Registration no.: 1084412
- Purpose: Education, culture, Judaism
- Location: London, SW3
- Region served: United Kingdom
- Website: cloreduffield.org.uk

The Clore Duffield Foundation is a registered charity in the United Kingdom. It was founded in 2000 by the merger of two charitable foundations, the Clore Foundation of Charles Clore and his daughter's Vivien Duffield Foundation.

== Formation ==
After her father's death in 1979, Duffield assumed the Chairmanship of the Clore Foundation in the UK and in Israel. In the UK she also established her own Vivien Duffield Foundation in 1987, and the two foundations merged in 2000.

== Museums and galleries ==
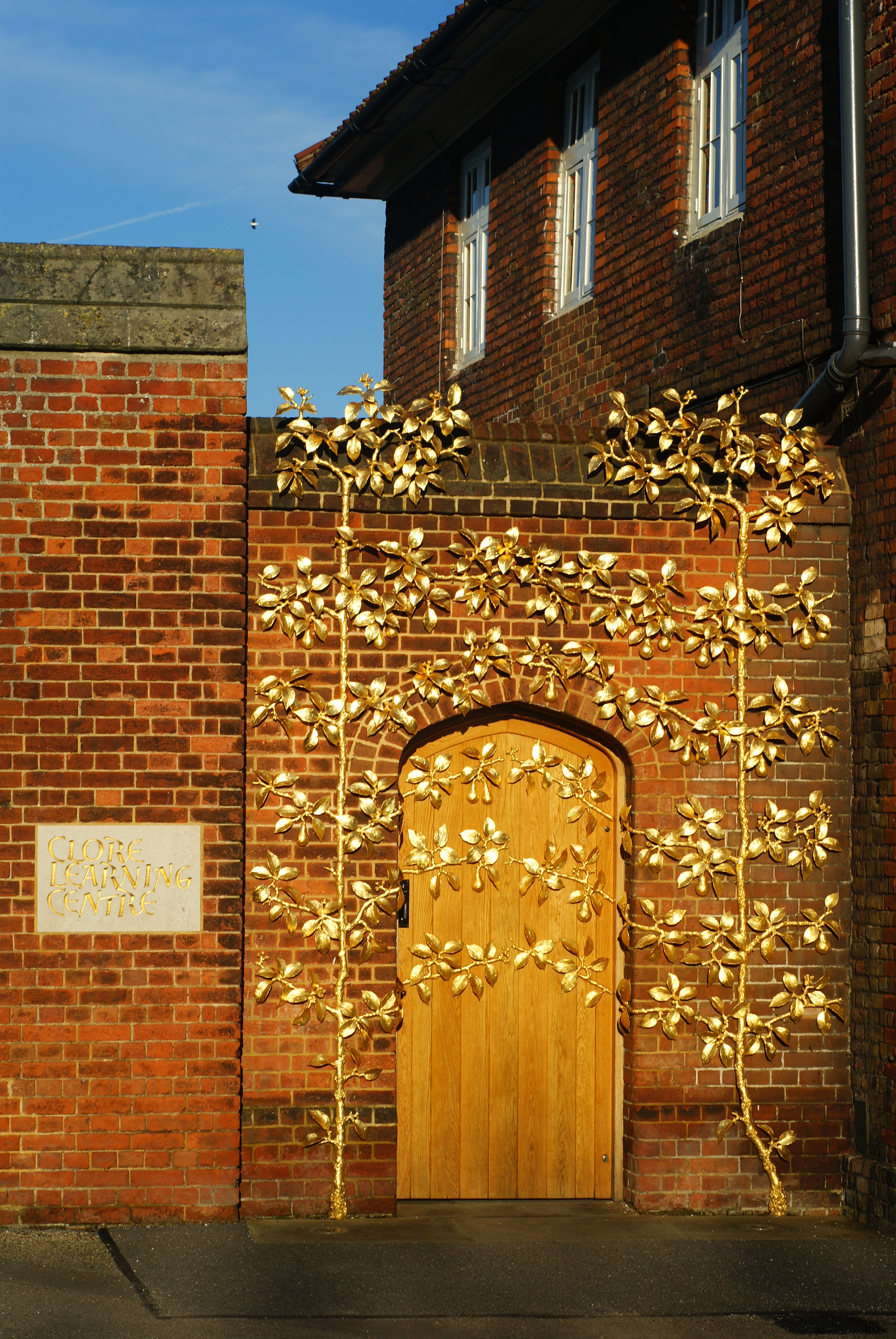
The Clore Learning Centre at Hampton Court Palace.

The Foundation has supported a wide range of organisations including the Royal Opera House, Tate, the Royal Ballet, the British Museum, the Natural History Museum, Dulwich Picture Gallery, the Southbank Centre, the Tower of David Museum in Jerusalem, Israel and Eureka! The National Children's Museum. The Foundation has made a particular contribution to cultural education, having funded dozens of Clore Learning Centres across the UK, and to leadership training, having launched the Clore Leadership Programme for the cultural sector in 2003 and the Clore Social Leadership Programme in 2008.

== JW3 ==
The Foundation initiated and provided most of the funding for the JW3 Jewish cultural centre in London.

== Leadership Programme ==
The Clore Leadership Programme provides professional training and personal development for British professionals in the cultural sector. It was founded in 2002.

Each year around 25 Clore Fellows are selected for a seven- to eight-month training programme in fundraising, media training, financial planning, and personal development. They also participate in extended secondments to organisations outside their previous professional experiences. Each Fellowship is individually tailored and the each Fellow receives support by a Mentor and individual coaching.

In addition, each Fellow can submit a proposal to undertake research once they have completed their Fellowship, which is funded by the Arts and Humanities Research Council and supervised by a Higher Education Institute.

Since 2006, the Programme has also offered short courses to a greater number of participants which capture a lot of the Clore experience in an intensive two-week residential course. It also offers training for members of Boards of Directors of cultural organisations.

=== Leadership ===
The founding Director of the Clore Leadership Programme was Chris Smith, who from 1997 to 2001 had been Secretary of State for Culture, Media and Sport. In July 2008, he was succeeded as Director by Sue Hoyle. The current Chair is Sir John Tusa. Hilary S Carty has served as Executive Director of the programme since September 2017.

=== Notable alumni ===
- Kenneth Tharp: Chief Executive, The Place
- Gus Casely-Hayford: Curator and cultural historian
- Nick Merriman: Director of Manchester Museum
- Erica Whyman: Chief Executive of Northern Stage, Newcastle upon Tyne
- Kathleen Soriano: Independent arts curator, writer and television broadcaster
- Maria Balshaw: Director of Tate art museums and galleries, former director of the Whitworth

== Other activities ==
Clore Social identifies, connects and develops leaders through its fully funded fellowship programme and works with people, partners and funders across all sectors to offer a holistic approach to developing leaders for social impact. So far, 101 fellows have joined its network. It is run by a small staff team from its office in Kings Cross, London.
