= Winifred M. Crompton =

British Egyptologist and curator at the Manchester Museum

- Born: 1870
- Died: 8 October 1933 (aged 62–63)
- Occupations: Egyptologist; Curator
- Employer: Manchester Museum

Winifred M. Crompton (1870 – 8 October 1932) was a British Egyptologist and curator at the Manchester Museum.

== Career ==
Crompton began her career at the Manchester Museum as its printer. In 1912, she became the first assistant-in-charge of Egyptology, curating a collection founded on part of Flinders Petrie's, donated to Manchester by one of his financial backers, Jesse Haworth. During her tenure she corresponded with other Egyptologists to acquire more objects and expand the collection. She was appointed the Assistant Keeper of Egyptology in 1922 and remained in that position until her death in 1932.

Crompton was an informal student of Margaret Murray, whom she first met in 1906. Murray visited the Manchester Museum to assist Crompton in cataloguing Petrie's collection and the two began a correspondence that would last the rest of Crompton's life. Murray encouraged Crompton to pursue her own research in Egyptology, leading to the publication of several scholarly papers.

Crompton died on 8 October 1932.

== Family ==
Crompton's sister, Alice Crompton, was the first woman to graduate with a degree in classics from the University of Manchester. In 1891, Alice became the head of the Manchester Settlements Women's House.

== Selected publications ==
- Crompton, Winifred M. (1916). "Two Clay Balls in the Manchester Museum". The Journal of Egyptian Archaeology. 3 (1): 128. doi:10.1177/030751331600300129. ISSN 0307-5133. S2CID 194049082.
- Crompton, Winifred M. (1918). "A Carved Slate Palette in the Manchester Museum". The Journal of Egyptian Archaeology. 5 (1): 57–60. doi:10.1177/030751331800500105. ISSN 0307-5133. S2CID 192279832.
