= Harry Britten =

British entomologist and signalman (1870–1954)

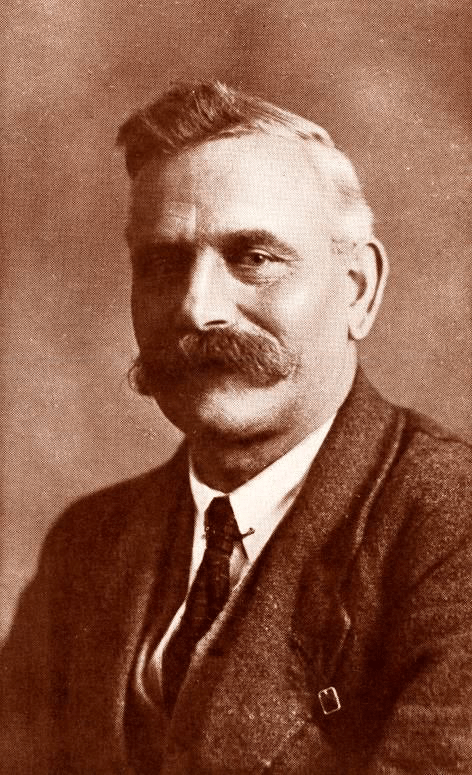
Portrait c. 1923

Harry Britten (3 September 1870 – 31 January 1954) was a British entomologist who worked at the Manchester Museum. He was involved in collecting and growing the collection of the Manchester Museum in numerous groups.

== Early life ==
Britten was born in Whiteparish, Wiltshire, and grew up in Scotland and later Penrith, Cumbria, where his father Henry became a gamekeeper at Skirtwith Abbey owned by E.W. Parker. He later worked in the railways and then as a keeper at an estate.

== Career and research ==
He became interested in insects while in Cumberland. He worked with E. B. Poulton, J. Collins and A.H. Hamm in 1913 and in 1919 he joined the Manchester Museum as an assistant to T.A. Coward, later becoming curator and working there until 1937. He was a keen collector but also worked meticulously, described the Ptiliidae collected by the Percy Sladen Expedition to Seychelles, revised the genus Ptenidium, and co-wrote a book on the pests of stored products with Hayhurst. He introduced various techniques, such as the use of bird pin-feathers mounted on wooden handle to set delicate specimens and the storage of acari slides in envelopes along with a note describing provenance and other information.

== Recognition ==
Britten received an honorary MSc in 1952 from the University of Manchester. He was a member of the Manchester Microscopical Society, the Manchester Entomological Society, the Royal Entomological Society and a special life fellow of the Linnean Society of London, among others. He was elected to membership of the Manchester Literary and Philosophical Society on 17 October 1949.

== Personal life ==
A namesake son (1894-1976) also took an interest in entomology and specialised in flies of the family Tephritidae.
