= Nick Merriman =

British museum director

Nicholas John Merriman OBE (born 6 June 1960) is the former chief executive of English Heritage. He was the director of the Horniman Museum and Gardens in south London from May 2018 to February 2024. Before that, he was the director of the Manchester Museum in Manchester, England. He had earlier worked at the Museum of London and University College, London. In April 2017 he was made honorary professor of museum studies in the University of Manchester.

He is known for his contributions to the development of public archaeology and museum studies, and for influencing the heritage sector around issues of cultural diversity, sustainability and the future of collections.

== Early life ==
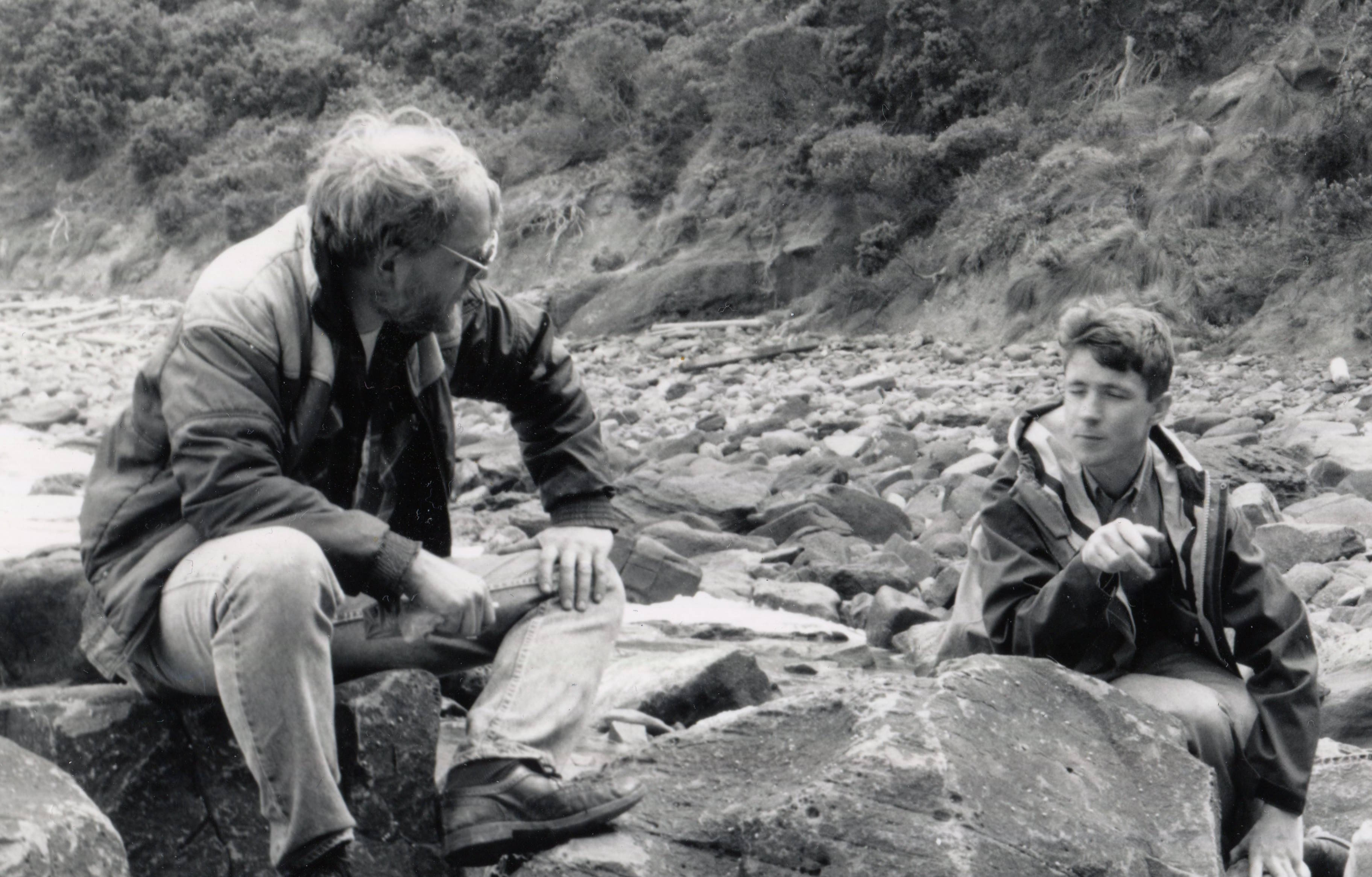
Tom Rich (Left) and Nick Merriman (Right) at Dinosaur Cove, Australia, circa 1995

Merriman was born and brought up in Sutton Coldfield. In an interview he stated: "my parents left school at 16, so education was not a big factor in the home life, but I was lucky enough to go to a good school and so on, did well academically... dad was always interested in old stuff" He attended the private King Edward VI Grammar School in Edgbaston. From collecting old bottles stimulated by his father's collecting of antiques from the junk stores of Birmingham, he graduated to an interest in archaeology, excavating most weekends from the age of 16 at the local Roman site of Wall, Staffordshire. He studied archaeology from 1979 to 1982 at the University of Cambridge, attending St John's College, and spent the summers excavating at the site of Gars-Thunau in Lower Austria.

From 1982 to 1983 he undertook a postgraduate course in museum studies at the University of Leicester, after which he returned to Cambridge to study for a PhD which examined social barriers to museum visiting. This was later published as 'Beyond The Glass Case: The Past, the Heritage and the Public' (1991).

== Career ==
=== Museum of London ===
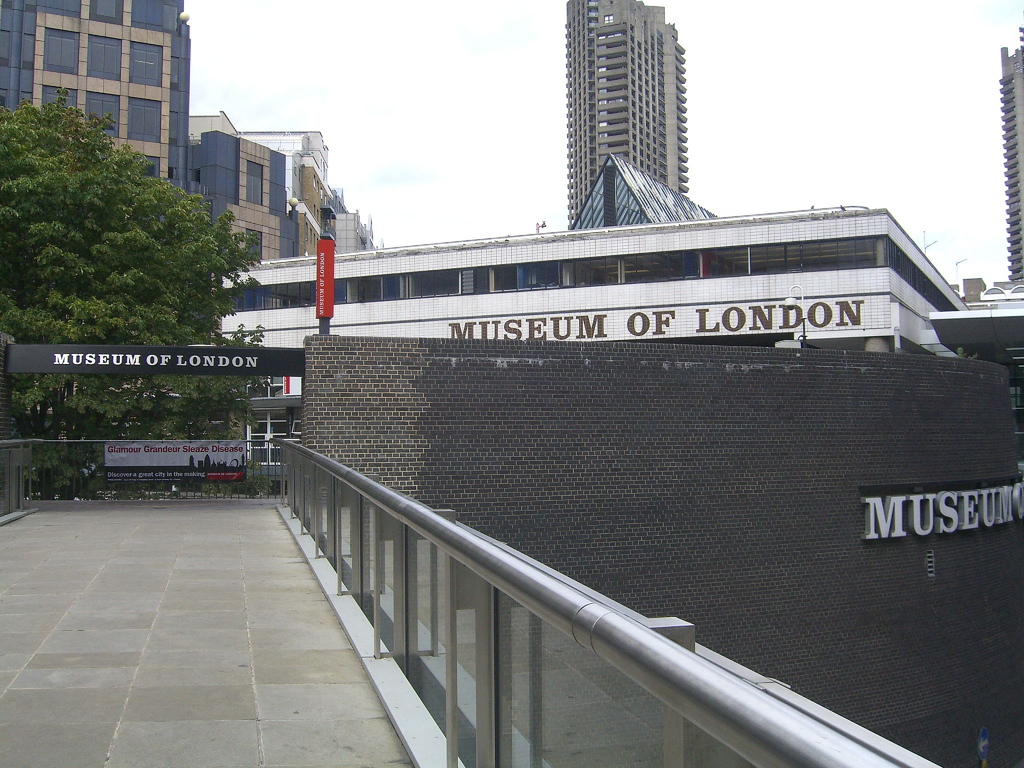
Museum Of London

Merriman began his career at the Museum of London in 1986 as Curator of Prehistory and subsequently in 1991, Merriman became the head of Department of Early London History and Collections. During this time he led a project called ‘The Peopling of London’, which told the story of the capital's cultural diversity from ancient times to the present through a ground-breaking exhibition and related activities in 1993. Merriman also authored and edited an accompanying book of the same title, published in 1993.

=== University College London ===
In 1997 Merriman joined the Institute of Archaeology at University College London as senior lecturer, where he ran the Museum Studies Masters course and developed new courses in cultural heritage studies and in public archaeology. He was later promoted to reader. While at UCL he became very interested in the university's extensive, but rather hidden, museums and collections, which include the Petrie Museum and the Grant Museum. He led the creation of a new university-wide museum service and became director of museums and collections alongside his academic duties. This later became UCL Culture.

=== Clore Leadership Programme ===
In 2004, Merriman joined the inaugural Clore Leadership Programme undertaking a bespoke scheme of training and development in cultural leadership. His research project looked at issues of memory and forgetting in memory institutions such as museums, in the context of thinking about sustainability and the disposal of objects from collections. Published in the journal Cultural Trends, this work was influential in driving the debate about these issues in the museum sector.

=== Manchester Museum ===
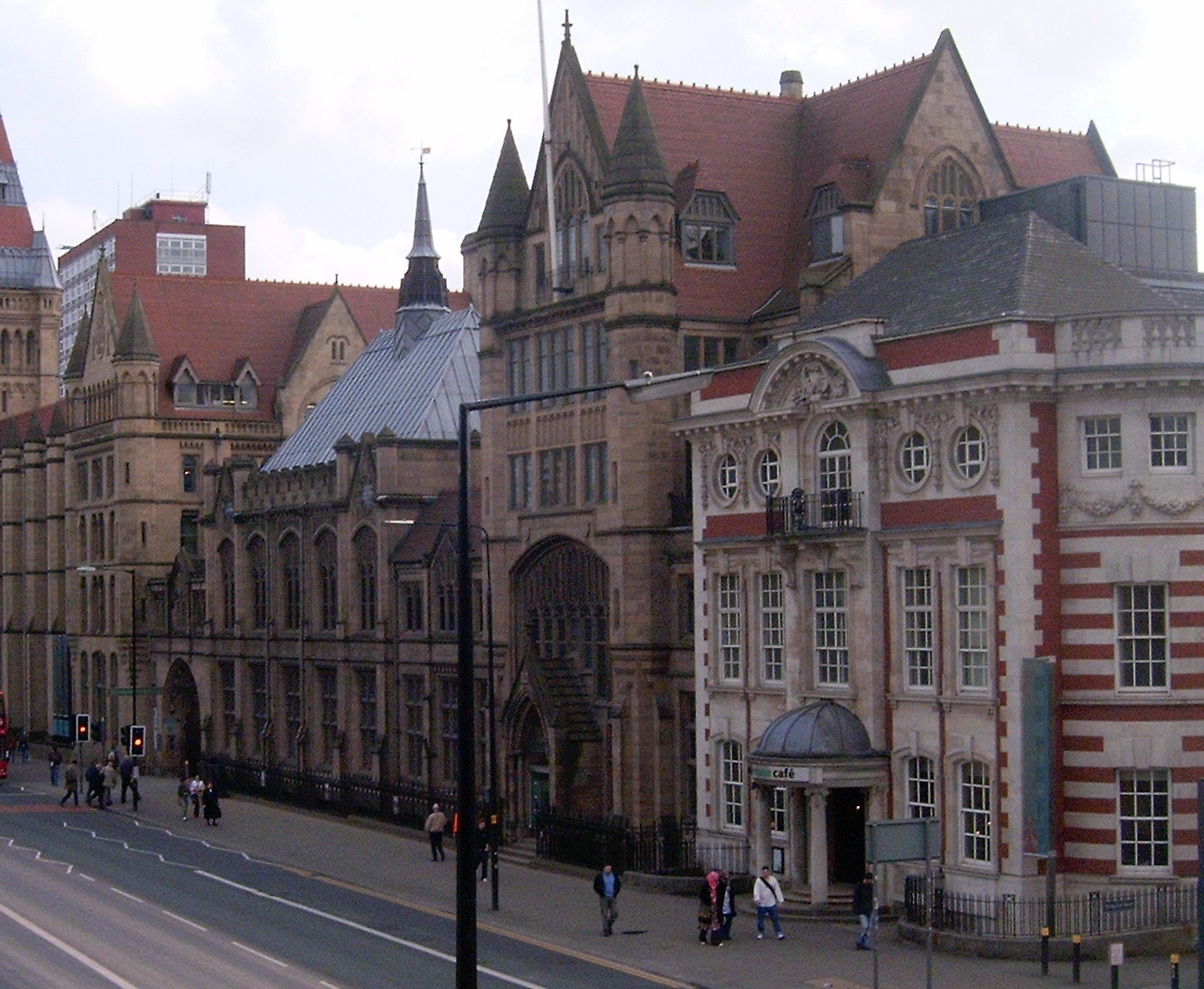
Manchester Museum

Merriman was appointed director of Manchester Museum in the University of Manchester in 2006. Merriman focused the museum's mission on promoting understanding between cultures and working towards a sustainable world and also oversaw the refurbishment of most of the museum's permanent galleries. This, together with a major programme of public engagement, led to a doubling of the museum's visitor numbers to over 500,000 a year. Over a decade, audiences also diversified to approximately reflect the demographics of the Greater Manchester population.

The museum gained a reputation for innovative work. This included the installation of a 'hermit' in the museum's tower in 2009 where a performance artist, Ansuman Biswas, lived for 40 days and 40 nights, contemplating the future of the planet and inviting people to think about why museums hold on to huge amounts of material, and the use of events company villa eugénie — who normally work on fashion launches — to work on the radical redisplay of the museum's natural history galleries.

Merriman also led a £13m capital project to transform the capacity of the museum and open it up to wider publics, including a new exhibition hall, a South Asia Gallery in partnership with the British Museum and a Chinese Culture Gallery. In 2018 Merriman was succeeded by Esme Ward, the first female Director in the Museum's history, who saw the project through to opening in 2021.

In 2017 Merriman was made Honorary Professor of Museum Studies at the University of Manchester.

Horniman Museum and Gardens Clocktower and agapanthus

=== Horniman Museum and Gardens ===
In May 2018 Merriman was appointed Chief Executive of the Horniman Museum and Gardens in London, succeeding Dame Janet Vitmayer.

Merriman was appointed Officer of the Order of the British Empire (OBE) in the 2024 New Year Honours for services to the arts and heritage.

=== English Heritage ===
Merriman took up the role of chief executive of English Heritage in February 2024. He initiated a programme of cost-cutting, in the face of financial challenges and post-pandemic changes to visitor behaviour; this involved job cuts, downgrading of professional curatorial roles, and site closures in winter. On 24 June 2025 it was announced that he had stood down from the role, for personal family reasons.

=== Other roles ===
Merriman was chair of the International Council of Museums (UK) from 2001 to 2004, president of the Council for British Archaeology from 2005 to 2008 and chair of the University Museums Group from 2009 to 2013.

Merriman was convenor of the Museums Association's ethics committee from 2008 to 2014 and chair of the Collections Trust from 2013 to 2016.

From 2017 to 2019 he was chair of the Wellcome Trust’s Inspiring Science Fund committee.

Merriman is chair of the environment and ecology subgroup of the National Museum Directors’ Council.

== Personal life ==
Merriman was married to Caroline Beattie from 1994 to 2005 and they had two sons. Merriman married Maria Balshaw, director of Tate in 2010.

== Publications ==
- 2015 The future of collecting in ‘disciplinary’ museums: interpretive, thematic, relational. In McCarthy, C (ed). Museum Practice. Wiley Blackwell, Chichester: 249-266.
- 2008 Museum collections and sustainability. Cultural Trends 17(1) 2008: 3-21.
- 2004 Public Archaeology. (Edited, and with introduction and paper). Routledge, London.
- 1999 Making Early Histories in Museums (Edited, and with introduction). Leicester University Press, Leicester.
- 1993 The Peopling of London: Overseas Settlement from Prehistoric Times to Present. (Edited and with introduction). Reaktion Books, London.
- 1991 Beyond The Glass Case: The Past, the Heritage and the Public in Britain. Leicester University Press, Leicester.
