= Nicholas Serota =

English art historian (born 1946)

Sir Nicholas Serota CH
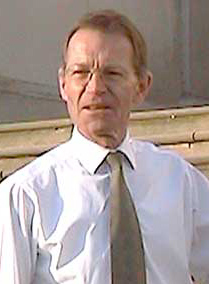
- Serota in 2006

8th Director of the Tate
- In office 1988–2017
- Preceded by: Alan Bowness
- Succeeded by: Maria Balshaw

Personal details
- Born: Nicholas Andrew Serota; 27 April 1946 (age 80) Hampstead, London, England
- Spouses: Angela Beveridge (m. 1973; div. 1995); Teresa Gleadowe (m. 1997) , now Lady Serota
- Children: 2
- Parent: The Baroness Serota
- Education: Haberdashers' Aske's Boys' School, Elstree
- Alma mater: Christ's College, Cambridge; Courtauld Institute of Art
- Awards: Knight Bachelor (1999); Member of the Order of the Companions of Honour (2013)

Sir Nicholas Andrew Serota CH (born 27 April 1946) is a British art historian and curator. He has been chairman of Arts Council England since February 2017.

Serota was director of the Museum of Modern Art, Oxford, then director of the Whitechapel Gallery, London, and then director of the Tate from 1988 to 2017. He was also chairman of the Turner Prize jury until 2007.

== Early life ==
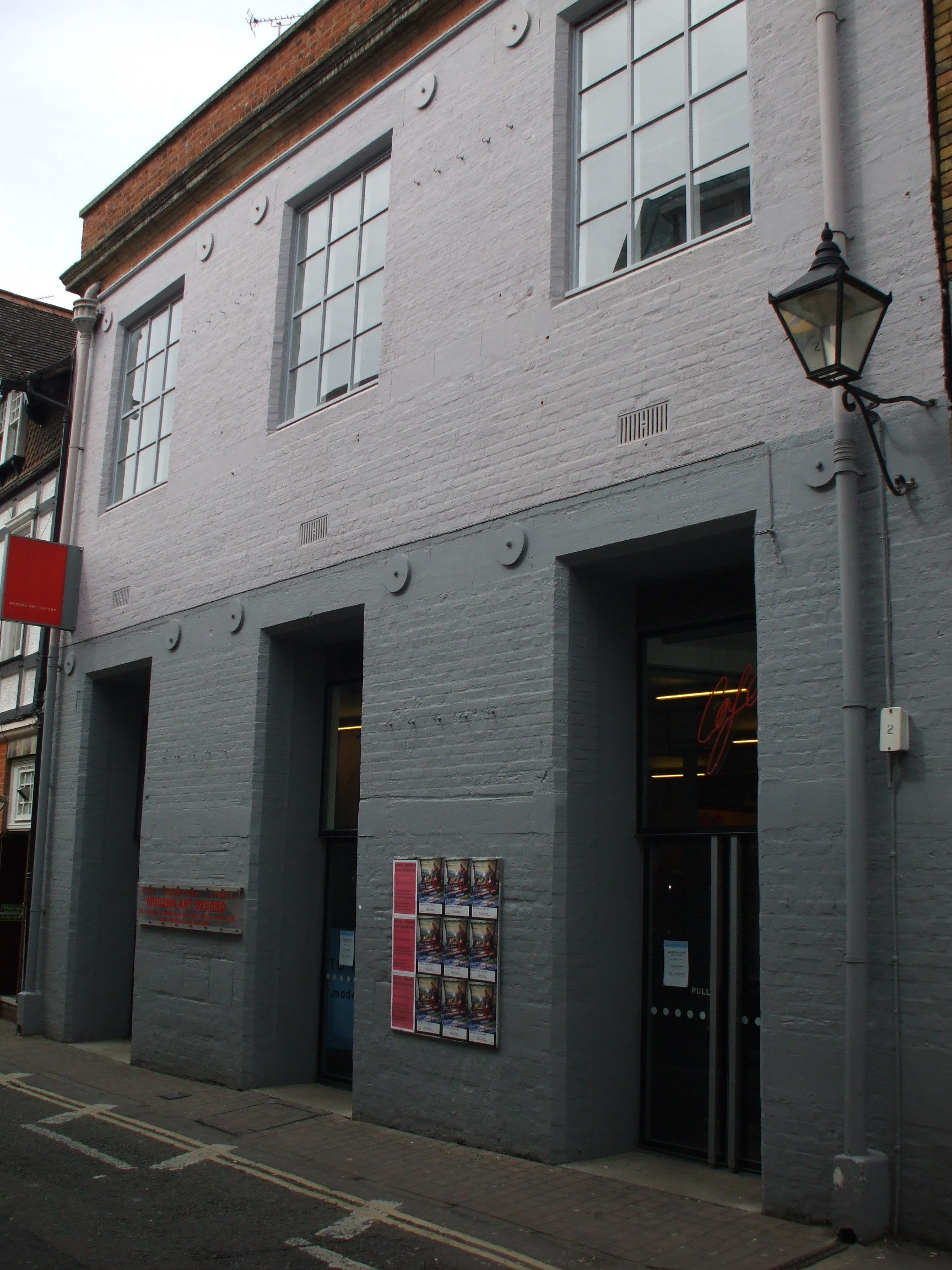
Modern Art Oxford

Born and raised in a Jewish household in Hampstead, North London, the only son of Stanley Serota, a civil engineer, and Beatrice Katz Serota, a civil servant, later a life peer and Labour Minister for Health in Harold Wilson's government and local government ombudsman. His younger sister, Judith Serota, who also works in the arts, is married to Francis Pugh. Serota was educated at Haberdashers' Aske's School (where he became school captain) and then studied economics at Christ's College, Cambridge, before switching to history of art. He completed a master's degree at the Courtauld Institute of Art, London, under the supervision of Michael Kitson and Anita Brookner; his thesis was on the work of J. M. W. Turner.

In 1969, Serota became chairman of the new Young Friends of the Tate organisation with a membership of 750: they took over a building in Pear Place, south of Waterloo Bridge, arranging lectures and Saturday painting classes for local children. The Young Friends staged their own shows and applied for an Arts Council grant, but were asked to desist by the Tate chairman and trustees, who were concerned with the appearance of official backing for these ventures. Serota and his committee resigned, which precipitated the end of the Young Friends, whose accommodation was taken over for rehearsals by the National Theatre.

In 1970, Serota joined the Arts Council of Great Britain's Visual Arts Department as a regional exhibitions officer. In 1973 he was made director of the Museum of Modern Art, Oxford (now Modern Art Oxford), where he organised an early exhibition of work by Joseph Beuys and formed a working relationship with Alexander "Sandy" Nairne, with whom he worked at various points in the following years.

== Whitechapel directorship ==
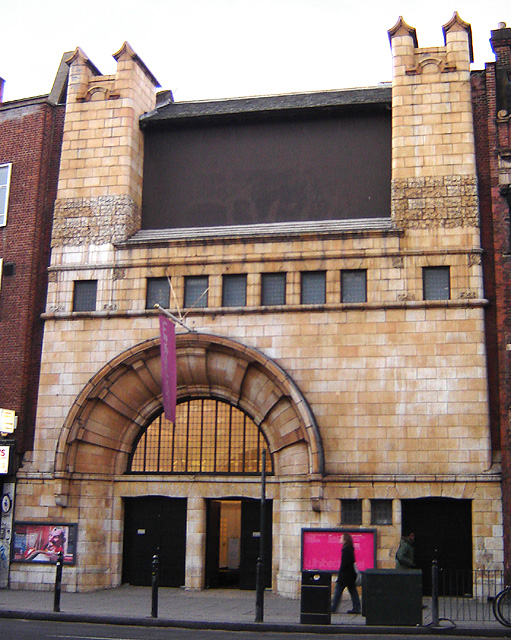
Whitechapel Gallery, London E1

In 1976, Serota was appointed director of the Whitechapel Gallery in London's East End. The Whitechapel was well regarded but had suffered from lack of resources. Serota assembled at the Whitechapel a staff including Jenni Lomax (later director of the Camden Arts Centre), Mark Francis (later of Gagosian Gallery) and Sheena Wagstaff (later chief curator of Tate Modern), and organised exhibitions of Carl Andre, Eva Hesse and Gerhard Richter as well as early exhibitions of then emerging artists such as Antony Gormley.

In 1976 he was a judge for an art competition run by the brewers Trumans. In 1980, assisted by Sandy Nairne, he organised a two-part exhibition of 20th century British sculpture. In 1981, he curated The New Spirit in Painting, with Norman Rosenthal and Christos Joachimides for the Royal Academy.

The shows, where Serota was helped by his administrator Loveday Shewell, often received adverse reviews in the press, which reacted with an uncharacteristic dislike for contemporary avant-garde art. Thus Serota remained somewhat distanced from the English establishment, although developing a growing reputation internationally in the art world.

In 1984–1985, Serota shut down the Whitechapel for over 12 months' extensive refurbishment. A strip of land had been acquired, which allowed a design by architects Colquhoun & Miller for a first-floor gallery, restaurant, lecture theatre and other rooms. Although receiving wide approbation, the scheme was in deficit by £250,000. In 1987, Serota raised £1.4 million in an auction of work, which he had asked artists to donate, paying off the debt, and creating an endowment fund to allow future exhibitions of more unconventional work, unlikely to attract a commercial sponsor.

== Tate directorship ==
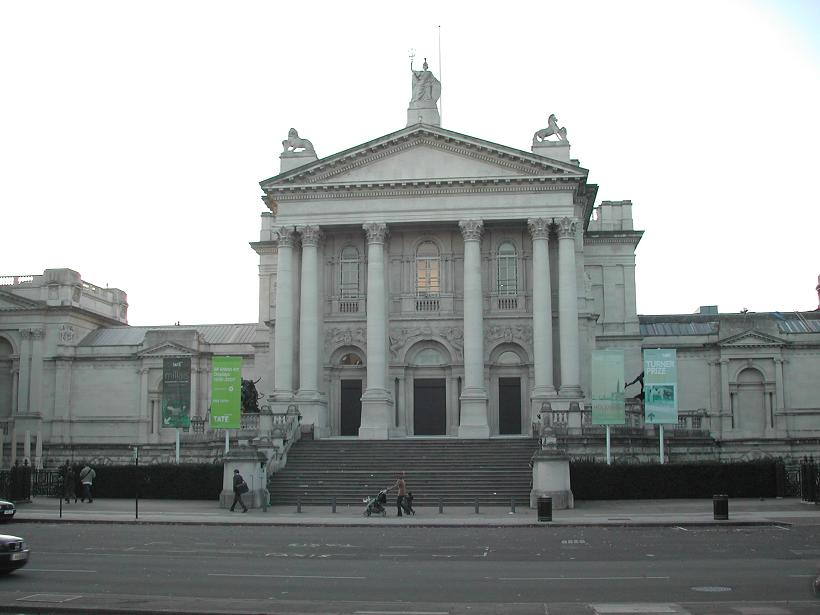
Tate Britain, previously the Tate Gallery

The short-listed candidates for the Tate directorship, who included Norman Rosenthal and Julian Spalding, were asked to prepare a seven-year scheme for the Tate. Serota's submission, on two sides of A4 paper, was titled "Grasping the Nettle". It analysed the various areas of Tate work and proposed future strategies to deal with the imminent crisis caused by restricted government financial support, changing public sector management expectations and increasing art market prices. He saw many areas of the Tate's operations in need of overhaul, and concluded that the gallery was loved, but not respected enough. Tate chairman, Sir Richard Rogers considered this by far the best proposal submitted.

News of Serota's appointment as Tate director in 1988 was received enthusiastically by Howard Hodgkin, who wrote in The Sunday Times, "Nick Serota has enormous energy and demonstrated at the Whitechapel a tremendous sense of diplomacy. He is a passionate man, and indeed is quite unusual in this country in his commitment to modern painting and sculpture."

In contrast, Peter Fuller made a scathing attack in Modern Painters magazine, saying that Serota would be incapable, by temperament and ability, of maintaining the Tate's historic collection.

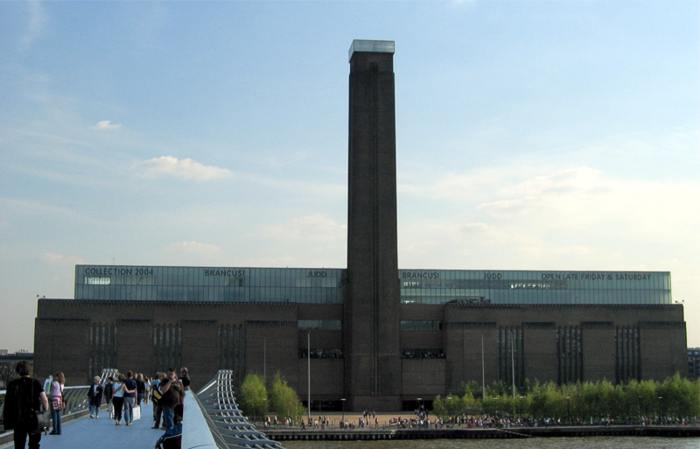
Tate Modern

Major expansion of the Tate Gallery had been seen as inevitable for two decades. In 1993, the creation of the National Lottery made it possible to anticipate the availability of major public funding for an enlarged Gallery.

In 1995, Tate received £52 million towards the conversion of the former Bankside Power Station to create Tate Modern. The final cost was £135 million; Serota managed to secure the funds to make up the shortfall from a range of private sources. Tate Modern opened in May 2000 and quickly became a major tourist fixture of London. As well as housing acclaimed new works by Louise Bourgeois and Anish Kapoor, the Gallery has also provided the base for successful exhibitions of Donald Judd, Picasso, Matisse and Edward Hopper.

On 21 November 2000, Serota gave the Dimbleby Lecture in London starting by telling of a 1987 Civil Service enquiry which ranked the pay of the Tate Gallery director with that of larger museums such as the National Gallery, because the former "has to deal with the very difficult problem of modern art." He explained it thus:

For in spite of much greater public interest in all aspects of visual culture, including design and architecture, the challenge posed by contemporary art has not evaporated. We have only to recall the headlines for last year's Turner Prize. "Eminence without merit" (The Sunday Telegraph). "Tate trendies blow a raspberry" (Eastern Daily Press), and my favourite, "For 1,000 years art has been one of our great civilising forces. Today, pickled sheep and soiled bed threaten to make barbarians of us all" (The Daily Mail). Are these papers speaking the minds of their readers? I have no delusions. People may be attracted by the spectacle of new buildings, they may enjoy the social experience of visiting a museum, taking in the view, an espresso or glass of wine, purchasing a book or an artist designed t-shirt. Many are delighted to praise the museum, but remain deeply suspicious of the contents.

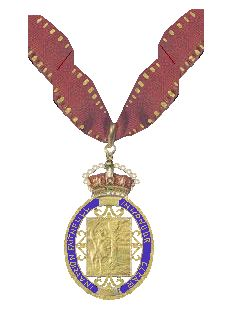
Member of the Order of the Companions of Honour insignia

In 2016, Serota received a salary of between £165,000 and £169,999 from the Tate, making him one of the 328 most highly paid people in the UK public sector then, at the lower end of the senior officials 'high-earners' list and well below what similar executives in public health, transport or government administrative top roles were earning.

In 1998, Serota conceived "Operation Cobalt", the secret buy-back of two of the Tate's Turner paintings that had been stolen in 1994 while they were on loan to a gallery in Frankfurt. The paintings were recovered in 2000 and 2002.

In December 2005, Serota admitted that he had submitted an application form with false information to the Art Fund (NACF) for a £75,000 grant to go towards buying the painting The Upper Room, stating that the Tate had made no commitment to purchase the work (a requirement of the grant), whereas they had already paid a first instalment of £250,000 several months previously. He attributed this to "a failing in his head". The NACF allowed the Tate to keep the grant. In 2006, the Charity Commission ruled the Tate had broken charity law (but not criminal law) over the purchase and similar trustee purchases, including ones made before Serota's directorship. The Daily Telegraph called the verdict "one of the most serious indictments of the running of one of the nation's major cultural institutions in living memory". In April 2008, Stuckist artist Charles Thomson started a petition on the Prime Minister's website against Serota's Tate directorship.

In September 2016, the Tate announced that Serota would step down as director in 2017, and he would become Chairman of Arts Council England, for the term 1 February 2017 to 31 January 2025. Serota was succeeded at the Tate by Maria Balshaw.

== Reactions ==
Serota has been criticised by Platform and Liberate Tate for inviting increased sponsorship of the Tate from BP. Their demands were supported by 8,000 Tate members and visitors, and artists including Conrad Atkinson. When questioned about BP sponsorship during the Deepwater Horizon oil spill, Serota responded "We all recognise they have a difficulty at the moment but you don't abandon your friends because they have what we consider to be a temporary difficulty."

The art critic Brian Sewell coined the critical phrase 'the Serota tendency' to refer to the popular BritArt movement of the 1990s that was favoured by Serota's Tate and collectors such as Charles Saatchi.

Since its formation in 1999, the Stuckist art group has campaigned against Serota, who is the subject of the group's co-founder Charles Thomson's satirical painting Sir Nicholas Serota Makes an Acquisitions Decision (2000), one of the best known Stuckist works and a likely "signature piece" for the movement. Serota was dubbed the "least likely visitor" to The Stuckists Punk Victorian show at the Walker Art Gallery in 2004, which included a wall of work satirising him and the Tate, including Thomson's painting. In fact, he did visit and met the artists, describing the work as "lively". In 2005, the Stuckists offered 160 paintings from the Walker show as a donation to the Tate. Serota wrote to the Stuckists, saying that the work was not of "sufficient quality in terms of accomplishment, innovation or originality of thought to warrant preservation in perpetuity in the national collection", and was accused of "snubbing one of Britain's foremost collections".

In 2001, Stuart Pearson Wright, winner of that year's BP Portrait Award, said that Serota should be sacked, because of his advocacy of conceptual art and neglect of figurative painting.

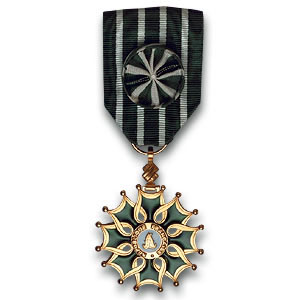
Ordre des Arts et des Lettres

== Honours ==
Knighted in the 1999 New Year Honours and appointed a Member of the Order of the Companions of Honour (CH) in the Queen's Birthday Honours 2013 for "services to art", Serota is also an Officer of the Ordre des Arts et des Lettres and a Chevalier of the Légion d'Honneur.

== Personal life ==
In 1973, Serota married Angela Beveridge (divorced 1995), having two daughters, Anya and Beth. In 1997, he married Teresa Gleadowe, a curator and arts administrator, with whom he has two stepdaughters. Sir Nicholas and Lady Serota divide their time between homes in King's Cross, London and Cornwall. He feels strongly that his Jewish family background has had an impact on his life, telling the Jewish Chronicle in 2010: "the values that I learned from my family undoubtedly play a huge part in what I do and the way I try to do it."

Cultural offices
| Preceded by Sir Alan Bowness | Director of the Tate Gallery; 1988–2016 | Succeeded by Maria Balshaw |
| Preceded by Sir Peter Bazalgette | Chairman, Arts Council England; 2016–present | Incumbent |
