= Maria Balshaw =

English museum director (born 1970)

Maria Balshaw CBE
- Born: Maria Jane Balshaw; 24 January 1970 (age 56); Birmingham, England
- Education: University of Sussex
- Occupation: Former Director of Tate
- Years active: 2017-2026
- Spouse: Liam Kennedy (m. 1997–2006) Nick Merriman (m. 2010)

Notes
- Thesis 'City of refuge': Harlem and urban aesthetic twentieth-century African American literature. (1998)

Maria Jane Balshaw CBE (born 24 January 1970) is the former director of the Tate art museums and galleries. The appointment was confirmed by Theresa May, the UK Prime Minister at the time, on 16 January 2017, making Balshaw the first female director of the Tate. On 12 December 2025, the Tate announced that Balshaw would step down as Director in Spring 2026.

Balshaw has been director of the Whitworth, University of Manchester, and also of Manchester City Galleries, which includes Manchester Art Gallery and Gallery of Costume. Until May 2017, she was director of culture for Manchester City Council. Balshaw also serves on the national council of the Arts Council England.

On 12 June 2015, Balshaw was appointed a Commander of the Most Excellent Order of the British Empire (CBE), in the Queen's birthday honours list, for Services to the Arts.

On 1 September 2027, Balshaw will succeed Valerie Amos, Baroness Amos as Master of University College, Oxford.

== Early life and education ==
Born in Birmingham, Balshaw grew up in Leicester and Northampton. After gaining a BA (Hons) degree in English literature and cultural studies at the University of Liverpool (1991), she attended the University of Sussex, where she gained an MA in critical theory (1992), followed by a PhD in African American visual and literary culture (1996).

== Career ==
=== Early career ===
Balshaw was appointed lecturer in cultural studies at University College Northampton in 1993. In 1997, Balshaw joined the University of Birmingham as research fellow and lecturer in visual culture.

In 2002, Balshaw left academia to become director of Creative Partnerships in Birmingham. She worked for Peter Jenkinson OBE, national director of creative partnerships and former West Midlands colleague where he had been founder director of the New Art Gallery, Walsall.

As part of the newly formed Creative Partnerships, Balshaw was tasked with bringing arts organisations and artists into partnerships with schools. A role which taught Balshaw "a tremendous amount about how to inspire, persuade and cajole unlike partners into common goals".

In 2004, Balshaw was selected as one of the inaugural fellows for the Clore Leadership programme. Initiated by the Clore Duffield Foundation, the Programme is the UK's first cross-disciplinary leadership programme for the cultural and creative sector. Balshaw was successful in her application to join the scheme from more than 400 other applicants. Since completing the yearlong course, Balshaw has been appointed a member of the strategic advisory board for the Clore Programme.

Upon completion of the Clore Leadership Programme, Balshaw acted as regional director of the West Midlands Creative Partnerships programme and then worked for nine months as director of external relations and development for ACE: West Midlands.

=== The Whitworth ===
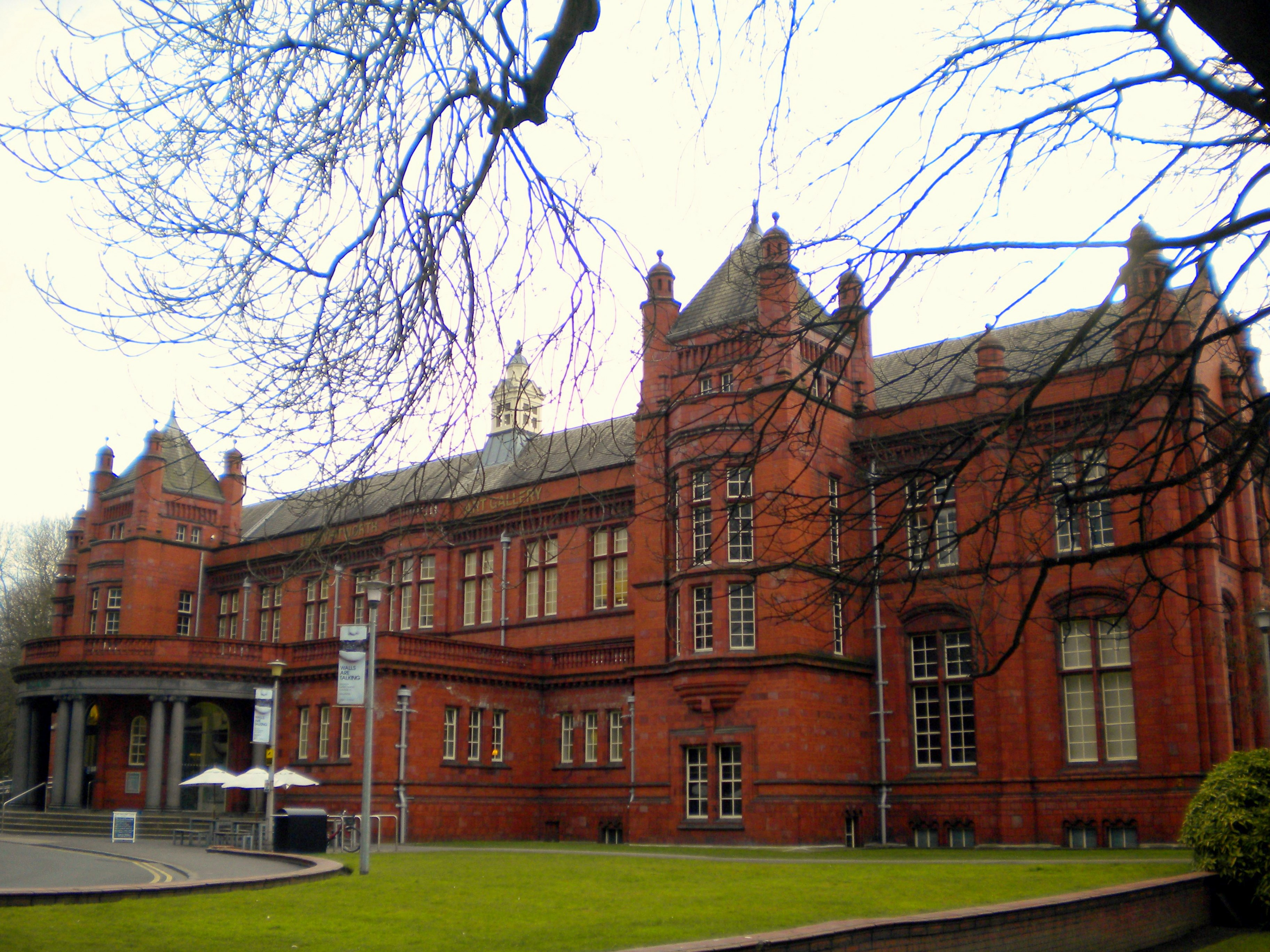
The Whitworth

In 2006, Balshaw was headhunted to become the director of the Whitworth. Throughout her work at the Whitworth, Balshaw has featured a broad range of disciplines championing art from around the world in particular West and South African art and the work of female artists. She has been quoted as saying "We do have a lot of women artists on show at the Whitworth, but only because they’re really good. That’s fair."

Balshaw's appointment at the Whitworth made her the second female director in the history of the gallery. Margaret Pilkington being the only other female director from 1925 to 1945. In June 2017, Balshaw stepped down as director of the Whitworth to become the first female director of Tate.

==== Key exhibitions ====
During her time as director at the Whitworth, Balshaw was responsible for commissioning a wide range of exhibitions. Some of the most notable include:

- Lynn Hershman Leeson – Autonomous Agents (2007) – a wide range of the artist's work – from the Roberta Breitmore series (1974–1978) to videos from the 1980s and interactive installations that use the Internet and artificial intelligence software.
- Marina Abramović – Presents (2009) – As part of the Manchester International Festival – Abramovich stripped the Whitworth of its artworks and replaced it with fourteen performance artists including Kira O’Reilly’s and Ivan Civic.
- Subversive spaces (2009) – looking at the relationship between surrealism and contemporary art, this exhibition included work from Sarah Lucas, Douglas Gordon, Gregor Schneider, Paul Delvaux, Brassaï, Dalí and Magritte. Nearly 50,000 visitors came to the Whitworth during the exhibition, a huge increase on the same period in previous years. Gregor Schneider's installation, Kinderzimmer transformed the usually sunlit galleries at the Whitworth into a pitch black space with just a doorway to aim for. Visitors brushed against various walls and curtains before stumbling towards an eerily lit nursery. Commissioned by the Whitworth for the exhibition Subversive Spaces, Kinderzimmer is the most significant UK installation by Schneider since his Die Familie Schneider in 2004.
- Walls Are Talking (2010) – the UK's first exhibition of wallpapers.
- Mary Kelly – Projects 1973–2010 (2011) – four decades of projects by American artist Mary Kelly were brought together in the most comprehensive exhibition of her work presented.
- The Land Between Us (2011) – historic and contemporary landscape art exploring its imagery, and the places and power associated with it.
- Anri Sala and Šejla Kamerić – 1395 Days without Red & Projections (2011) – as part of the Manchester International Festival, two films about the siege of Sarajevo were premiered at the Whitworth alongside a number of previous Artangel film projects, including films and installations made by Francis Alÿs, Atom Egoyan and Catherine Yass. Also as part of MIF Tony Oursler's Influence Machine filled the trees of Whitworth Park with glimmering ghostly faces from the past.
- Jane and Louise Wilson – Post-atrocity exhibition (2012–2013) – An exhibition which included a world premiere where the Wilsons filmed the workers of Chernobyl in a new town. Atomgrad (Nature Abhors a Vacuum) documented how the bright future promised by nuclear power turned out to be dangerous and unpredictable.
- Nancy Holt – Land Art (2013) – an exhibition of Holt's fascination with time and space
- Nikhil Chopra – Coal On Cotton (2013) – Chopra lived and worked in the half completed wing of a new gallery space at the Whitworth for 65 hours during Manchester International Festival. His work explored Manchester's textile history and the people involved in both India and Britain.
- Cornelia Parker (2015) – an extensive exhibition that included a wide range of work. The exhibition included The War Room (one of two new commissions) and Parker's most famous work Cold Dark Matter: An Exploded View (1991). Parker also worked with scientists at the University of Manchester including Kostya Novoselov and Andre Geim. Novoselov created samples of graphene from works in the Whitworth's collection including drawings by William Blake, Turner, Constable and Picasso. He also used a pencil-written letter by the man who split the atom, Sir Ernest Rutherford. The new sample of graphene was turned into a work of art by Parker to be used on the opening night of the new gallery. A firework display was triggered by Novoselov breathing on a graphene sensor created with a Blake painting.

==== Capital transformation ====
Balshaw started the process of reviving the Whitworth in 2007 with the launch of a new capital build project. Funding for the ambitious project totalling £15m came from the University Of Manchester, Heritage Lottery Fund, Arts Council England, trusts and foundations including Clore Duffield, Wolfson Foundation, Headley Trust, The Granada Foundation as well as Friends of the Whitworth and private donors.

In 2009, with the support of the Royal Institute of British Architects, Balshaw ran an international competition, that attracted 139 submissions from architects from all over the world. The competition was chaired by Tom Bloxham and included Peter Saville as a judge. McInnes Usher McKnight Architects (MUMA) were appointed architects for the project and building work began in 2013.

On completion, the gallery has doubled its exhibition space and opened up the gallery to Whitworth park. As The Guardian reported: "At the front, they have softened the forbidding entrance with a sculpture forecourt and an inviting sequence of steps, ramps and benches; but the real meat of the project is saved for the back, where MUMA have extended the symmetrical composition with a pair of wings that project out into Whitworth Park, framing a new sculpture garden. "It’s about having open arms and saying: ‘This place belongs to you.’" says Balshaw. "Before, we turned our back with a blank brick wall – now you can see what’s going on inside."

Balshaw commissioned landscape architect Sarah Price to design two new areas of landscaping named the Art and Orchard garden with other new facilities including a study centre, learning studio and a collections centre.

==== Reopening ====
The Whitworth reopened on 14 February 2015, with more than 18,000 people attending the new gallery in the first two days to explore new exhibitions from Cornelia Parker and Cai Guo-Qiang. In just six weeks, more than 100,000 visitors had explored the new gallery in the park. The new Whitworth was named RIBA NW building of the year in May 2015.

=== Manchester Art Gallery ===
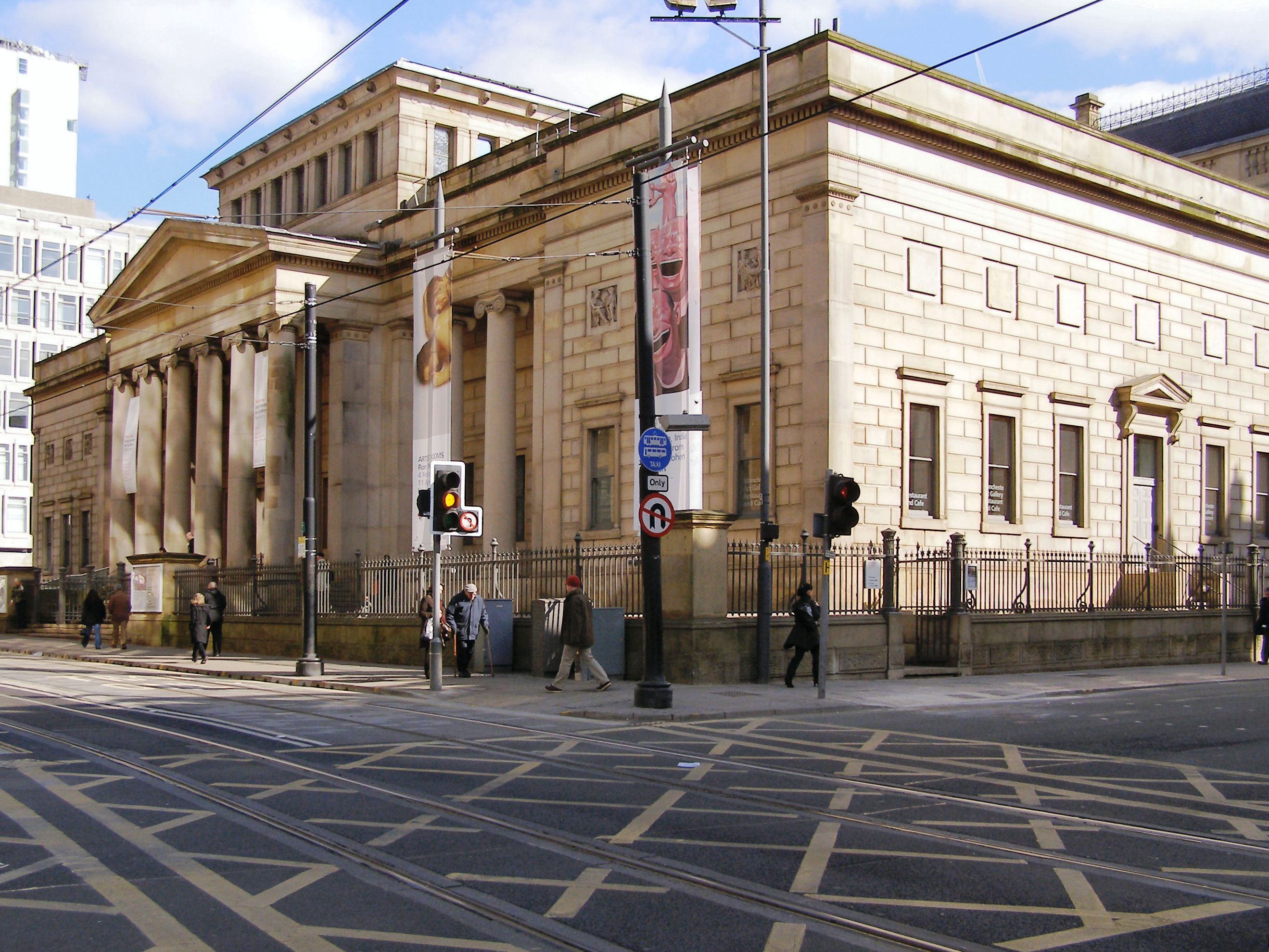
Manchester Art Gallery

In 2011, Balshaw took on the role of Director of Manchester City Galleries alongside her duties at the Whitworth. This dual directorship brought the two institutions' collections of historic and modern art into alliance for the first time in their history. Upon the appointment, Richard Leese leader of Manchester City Council, said creating a joint director role for the two galleries would “not only safeguard, but significantly enhance the city’s cultural reputation”.

==== Key exhibitions ====
During her time as director, Manchester Art Gallery hosted a wide range of contemporary and historical exhibitions including:

- Ford Madox Brown – Pre-Raphaelite Pioneer (2012) – Bringing together 140 works from the Pre-Raphaelite painter, this was the first exhibition from Brown since 1964.
- We Face Forward (2012) – a city wide exhibition of contemporary west African art that attracted more than a quarter of a million visitors across Manchester and included 33 exhibitors from nine countries including Georges Adéagbo, El Anatsui, Romuald Hazoumè and George Osodi. The event, led by Balshaw, received funding from the Paul Hamlyn Foundation and included work in the Manchester Art Gallery, the Whitworth, The Manchester Museum, Band on the Wall, The Bridgewater Hall, The Printworks, Gallery Of Costume, National Football Museum and Royal Northern College of Music. Balshaw commented ahead of We Face Forward: "Manchester's connections to West Africa are part of its industrial and trading history. This exhibition brings the dynamism of West African art today to Manchester, as the world comes to the UK for the Olympics."
- Jeremy Deller – All That Is Solid Melts Into Air (2013/2014) – Deller created a personal view of the cultural, sociological and technological impact of the Industrial Revolution using a combination of artworks, objects and historical accounts.
- Joana Vasconcelos – Time Machine (2014) – the UK’s largest exhibition of works by the Portuguese contemporary artist. This show included more than twenty of Vasconcelos's most significant sculptures including the world premiere of a new textile work.
- Ryan Gander – Make Every Show Like It's Your Last (2014) – Gander's largest UK show to date.

=== The Manchester Partnership ===
In 2012, Balshaw led the partnership of Manchester City Galleries, Whitworth Art Gallery and The Manchester Museum in their application for £5.3m of funding from the Arts Council England.

=== Manchester City Council ===
During 2014, as part of her role as director of culture, Balshaw worked to persuade George Osborne to commit significant funding to building a new artistic and cultural centre in Manchester. In 2014, the government announced funding of £78m for The Factory, a brand new artistic hub on the old Granada Studios site in the city’s Castlefield district.

=== Tate ===
Balshaw has been director of Tate art museums and galleries since 2017, succeeding Sir Nicholas Serota (1988 to 2017). Her appointment was confirmed by the UK prime minister on 16 January 2017, making her the first female director of the Tate. On 12 December 2025, the Tate announced that Balshaw would step down as Director in Spring 2026.

Balshaw was a member of the jury for the inaugural Sigg Prize, which selected Samson Young as winner in 2020.

In 2024, Balshaw published Gathering of Strangers: Why Museums Matter, based on the Slade Lectures in Fine Art, delivered at the University of Cambridge in 2022.

== Personal life ==
Balshaw married Professor Liam Kennedy in 1997; they have a son and a daughter. The couple separated in 2006. Balshaw married Nick Merriman, who was then director of the Manchester Museum, in 2010. They live in Manchester with Balshaw's children. In 2014, Balshaw’s Vivienne Westwood wedding dress was included in the Something Blue exhibition at the Gallery of Costumes.

Balshaw is a director of the Rothesay Pavilion Charity. The charity was set up in 2014 with the aim of raising funds to transform the category A listed Pavilion into a new cultural centre for Bute. In 2015, the charity reached its funding target of £8m. The new development will upgrade the main auditorium and add a second performance space for young people. There will also be new gallery space, a bistro, shops and bars along with a new multi-purpose rooftop space.

In August 2020, Balshaw was the guest for BBC Radio 4's Desert Island Discs. Her book choice was Vickery’s Folk Flora: an A-Z of the Folklore and Uses of British and Irish Plants by Roy Vickery, her luxury item was a full set of flower and vegetable seeds, and her favourite track was "Waiting for the Great Leap Forward" by Billy Bragg. In the programme, she revealed that, prior to the birth of her son, she had suffered three miscarriages.
