= Jesse Haworth =

British businessman (1835–1921)

Jesse Haworth (1835–1921) was a British cotton magnate who provided financial support for the archaeological work of W.M. Flinders Petrie.

His interest in Egyptology probably began in 1877, when the novelist Amelia B. Edwards published her best seller, A Thousand Miles Up the Nile. Edwards was a long-time supporter of Petrie. Haworth and his wife read her book and they were soon following her journey up the Nile.

Haworth was a partner in the Manchester firm of James Dilworth and Sons. As well as sponsoring Egyptology, he also collected paintings and Wedgwood ceramics.

Petrie recalls in his autobiography "While in England, I heard that the offer of help in excavating came from Jesse Haworth of Manchester, though the kind intervention of Miss Edwards. Just at the same time, I had an offer of assistance from Martyn Kennard who had a family interest in Egypt. Nevertheless, I did not wish to pledge my time to be entirely at the service of anyone. The plan, which worked very smoothly, was that I drew on my two friends for all the costs of workmen and transport, while I paid all my expenses. In return, we equally divided all that came to England. Thus it was in my interest to fund as much as I could."

In 1890 Haworth and Kennard presented their collection of objects from Kahun, and another Fayoum town site Gurob, to The Manchester Museum. In 1912 with the collection rapidly expanding, Haworth made a substantial contribution to the building fund to primarily house the Egyptian collections. In recognition of his generosity, and of his position as one of the first patrons of scientific excavation in Egypt, The University of Manchester conferred upon Jesse Haworth the honorary Degree of Doctor of Laws.

In 1919, Jesse Haworth donated a further £10,000 to the museum, and under the terms of his Will, in 1921, he bequeathed a further £30,000 along with his private collection of Egyptian Antiquities.

In 1920, Haworth approved plans for a third stage of the Museum building which would provide a further display area as well as much-needed workrooms and a storage space for the collection. His widow opened this extension in November 1927.
