= Barbara Pyrah =

British geologist

- Pyrah giving an interview to YTV in 1986 in the Yorkshire Museum
- Born: Barabara Joan Pyrah; 1943
- Died: 8 January 2016 (aged 72–73); Stamford Bridge
- Occupations: Archaeologist; Museum curator

Academic work
- Discipline: Geology
- Institutions: Manchester Museum; Yorkshire Museum

Barbara Joan Pyrah (1943–2016) was a British geologist, museum curator, and illustrator.

== Career ==
From 1965 to 1968 Pyrah was the assistant keeper of geology at the Manchester Museum. From 1968 to her retirement in 1988, Pyrah was the Keeper of Geology at the Yorkshire Museum. During her time at the Yorkshire Museum Pyrah produced a four-part catalogue detailing the type and figured fossil specimens held in the collections. This catalogue represented over 900 specimens from approximately 150 publications. The research interest in the collections of the museum rose considerably as a result of these published catalogues.

Pyrah illustrated the 1977 publication The Ice Age in Yorkshire.

Pyrah was a member of the organising committee of the Geological Curators' Group from 1975 to 1977.

She retired from the museum due to ill-health in 1988; In retirement she was a member of the Dunnington Art Club and a founding member of the Friends of Hagg Wood.

She is listed as one of the donors to the mosaic map in York Museum Gardens.

=== Exhibitions ===
Pyrah organised a major exhibition at the Yorkshire Museum: 'A New Look at the Dinosaurs' was opened in April 1984 by David Bellamy. The exhibition was inspired by a 1979 book of the same name by Alan J. Charig, who gave a lecture in the museum in celebration of its opening. The exhibition received a favourable review in New Scientist, which described it as "an exhibition of unimpeachable scholarship which provides something of interest and enjoyment at any and every age. Over 335,000 visitors saw the exhibition by the end of its year-long display.

== Publications ==
- Pyrah, B. J. 1974. "Collections and Collectors of Note. 3. Yorkshire Museum". Geological Curators Group Newsletter 1(2). 52–55.
- Pyrah, B.1976. "Catalogue of the type and figured fossils in the Yorkshire Museum: part 1", Proceedings of the Yorkshire Geological Society 41(1.4)
- Pyrah, B.1977. "Catalogue of the type and figured fossils in the Yorkshire Museum: part 2", Proceedings of the Yorkshire Geological Society 41(2.23)
- Pyrah, B.1978. "Catalogue of the type and figured fossils in the Yorkshire Museum: part 3", Proceedings of the Yorkshire Geological Society 41(4.32)
- Pyrah, B.1979. "Catalogue of the type and figured fossils in the Yorkshire Museum: part 4", Proceedings of the Yorkshire Geological Society 42(3.24)
- Pyrah, B. J. 1981. "Edward Charlesworth and the British Natural History Society. 1: Material in the Yorkshire Museum", The Geological Curator 3(2). 88–92.
- Pyrah, B. J. 1988. The history of the Yorkshire Museum and its geological collections. York: The Ebor Press. ISBN 1 85072 042 8
