= Manchester Museum =

Museum in Manchester, England

Coordinates: 53°27′59″N 2°14′04″W

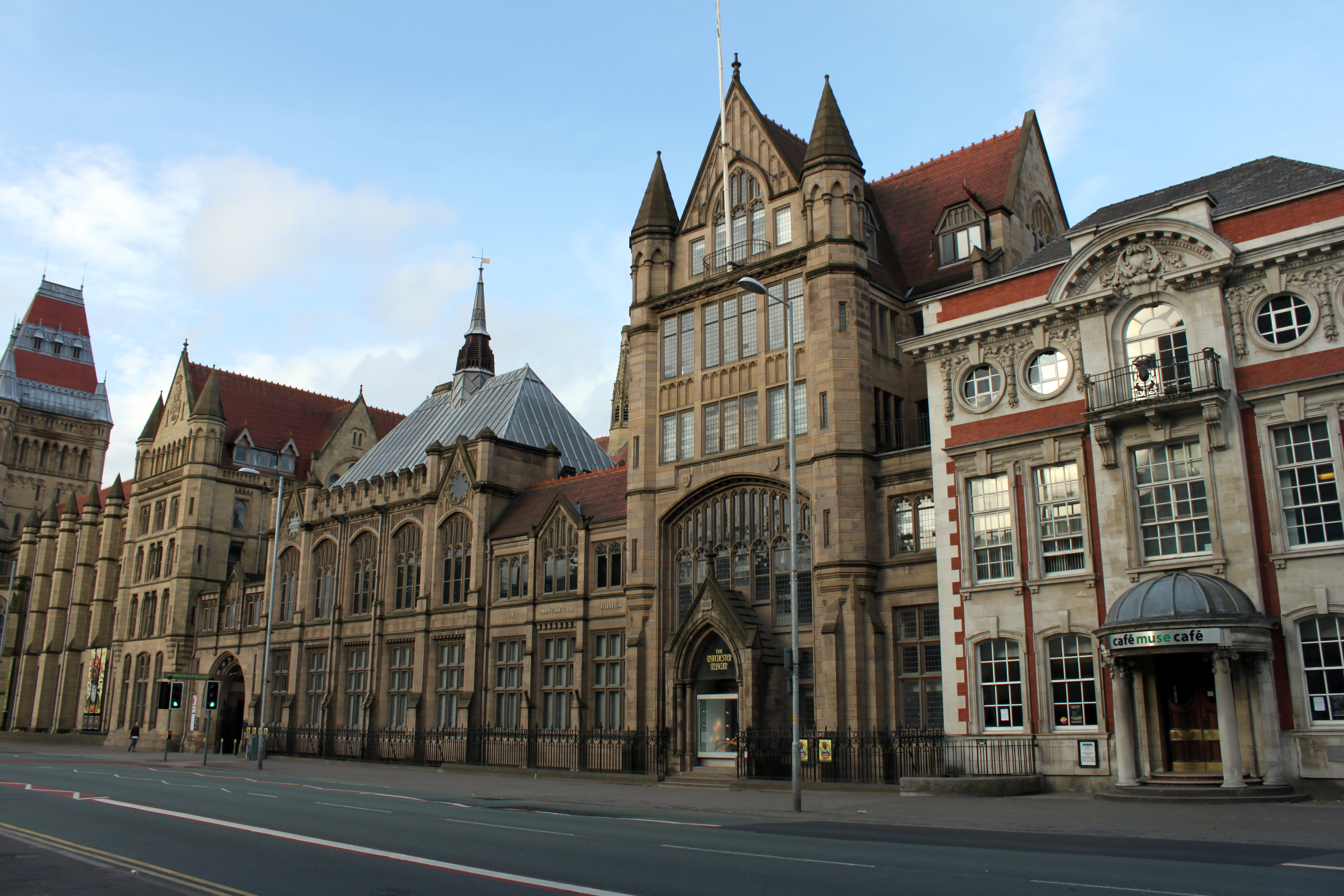
- Established: 1867
- Location: University of Manchester, Oxford Road, Manchester, England
- Type: University museum of archaeology, natural history and anthropology
- Visitors: 648,595 in 2025
- Director: Esme Ward
- Website: museum.manchester.ac.uk

Listed Building – Grade II
- Official name: Manchester Museum Extensions
- Designated: 2 October 1974
- Reference no.: 1246283

Manchester Museum is a museum displaying works of archaeology, anthropology and natural history and is owned by the University of Manchester, in England. Sited on Oxford Road (A34) at the heart of the university's group of neo-Gothic buildings, it provides access to about 4.5 million items from every continent. It is the UK’s largest university museum and serves both as a major visitor attraction and as a resource for academic research and teaching. It has around 650,000 visitors each year.

== History ==
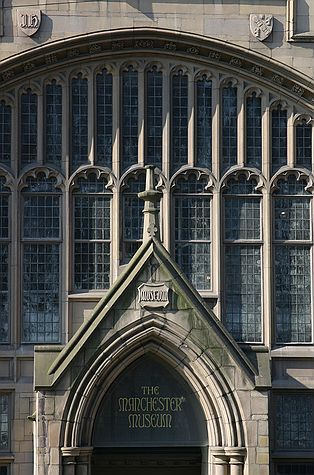
The former main entrance of Manchester Museum

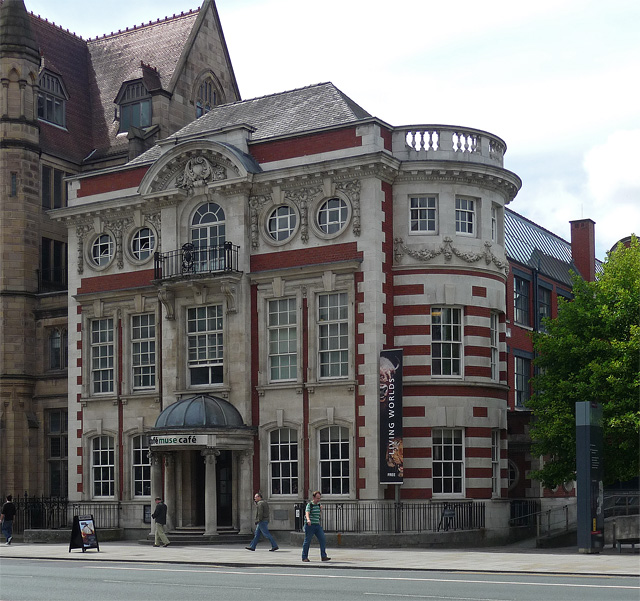
The former dental hospital

The museum's first collections were assembled by the Manchester Society of Natural History formed in 1821 with the purchase of the collection of John Leigh Philips. The society established a museum in Peter Street, Manchester, on a site later occupied by the Young Men's Christian Association, in 1835. In 1850 the collections of the Manchester Geological Society (founded 1838) were added. By the 1860s both societies encountered financial difficulties and, on the advice of the evolutionary biologist Thomas Huxley, Owens College (now the University of Manchester) accepted responsibility for the collections in 1867. The museum in Peter Street was sold in 1875 after Owens College moved to new buildings in Oxford Street.

The college commissioned Alfred Waterhouse, architect of London's Natural History Museum, to design a museum to house the collections for the benefit of students and the public on a site in Oxford Road (then Oxford Street). The Manchester Museum was opened to the public in 1888. At the time, the scientific departments of the college were immediately adjacent, and students entered the galleries from their teaching rooms in the Beyer Building.

Two subsequent extensions mirror the development of its collections. The 1912 pavilion was largely funded by Jesse Haworth, a textile merchant, to house the archaeological and Egyptological collections acquired through excavations he had supported. The 1927 extension was built to house the ethnographic collections. The Gothic Revival street frontage which continues to the Whitworth Hall has been ingeniously integrated by three generations of the Waterhouse family. When the adjacent University Dental Hospital of Manchester moved to a new site, its old building was used for teaching and subsequently occupied by the museum.

The museum is one of the University of Manchester's 'cultural assets', along with the Whitworth Art Gallery, John Rylands Library, Jodrell Bank visitor centre and others.

=== 2020s redevelopment ===
Manchester Museum temporarily closed on 29 August 2021 for redevelopment. During this time the Museum underwent the final phase of a £13.5 million reconstruction programme. The renovated museum includes a two-storey extension and new galleries including a large Exhibition Hall, Belonging Gallery, the Lee Kai Hung Chinese Culture Gallery and the South Asia Gallery. The South Asia Gallery is a partnership with the British Museum and will be the first ever permanent exhibition space in the UK dedicated to the stories, experiences and contributions of South Asian communities. The museum reopened 18 February 2023 and managed to attract 52,000 visitors in its first week after reopening.

== Galleries and redevelopment ==
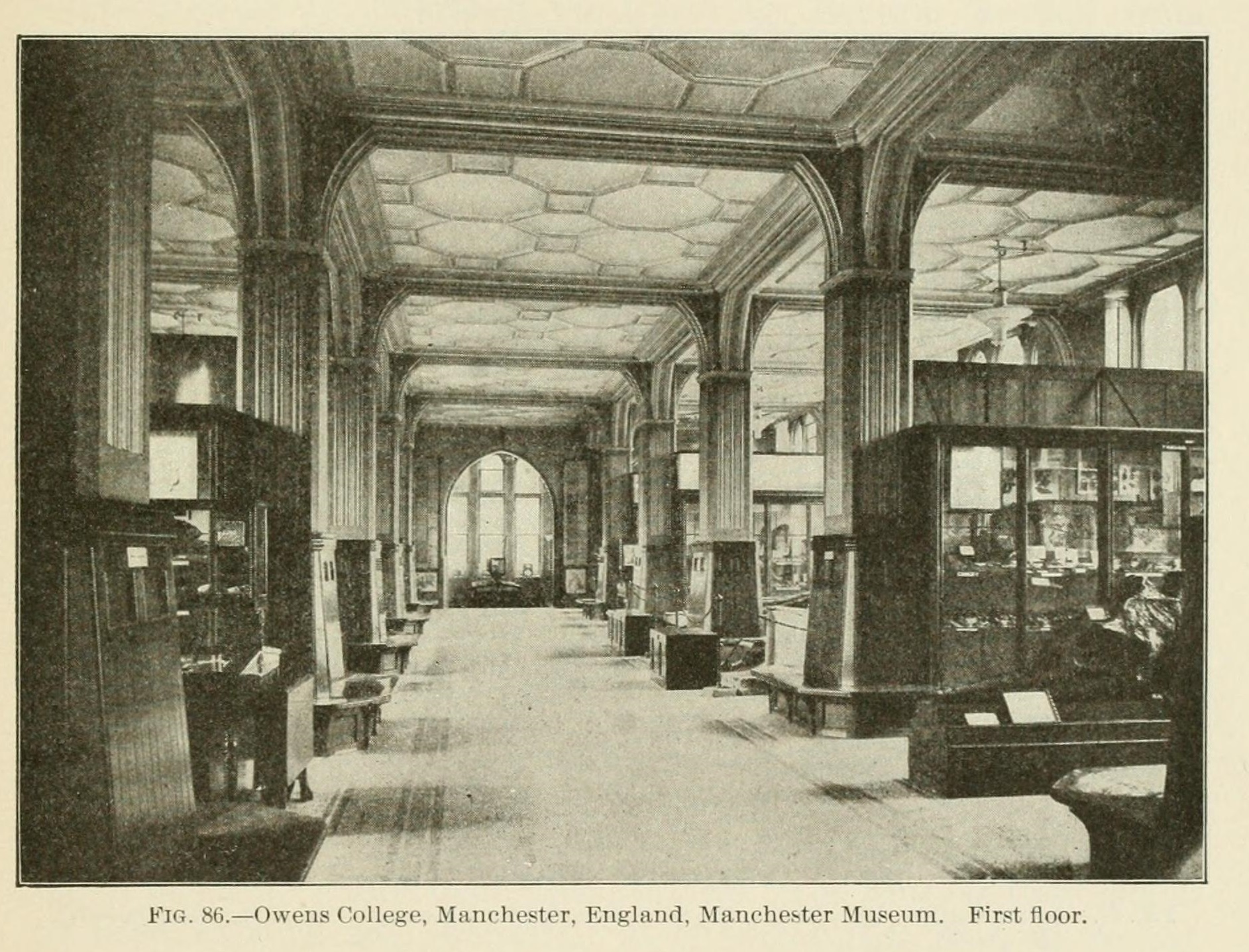
The first floor of the museum in 1903

In 1997 the museum was awarded £12.5 million from the Heritage Lottery Fund and with funding from the European Regional Development Fund, the University of Manchester, the Wellcome Trust, the Wolfson Foundation and other sponsors, the museum was refurbished and reopened in 2003. At this time the Fossils Gallery and Living Cultures Galleries were developed and The Vivarium was established on the second floor of the 1885 building.

The Manchester Gallery explores the changing relationship between the museum, Manchester and the rest of the world. It explores where collections came from and how they relate to colonialism and empire.

Living Worlds opened in April 2011 as a new type of natural history gallery to encourage visitors to reflect on their attitudes to nature. The gallery was designed by Brussels-based design firm villa eugenie. Exhibits include a mounted demoiselle crane with a piece of rubble from the Hiroshima atomic bomb blast and hundreds of origami cranes. Themed exhibits explore attitudes to nature and environmental issues. The gallery has a smartphone app, 'Living Worlds'. This gallery has an allotment in the courtyard in front of the museum, where volunteers grow fruit and vegetables and show visitors how to grow and look after plants.

Ancient Worlds opened in October 2012 and transformed the main galleries of the 1912 building. Discovering Archaeology explores how people make sense of the past using objects and includes exhibits on facial reconstruction and some of the characters who were involved in the development of archaeology and the museum, including William Flinders Petrie and William Boyd Dawkins. Egyptian Worlds, takes visitors on a journey through the landscape, customs and practices of the Ancient Egyptians. Exploring Objects, reveals the archaeology collections through 'visible storage' with a difference. The gallery incorporates a haptic interactive.

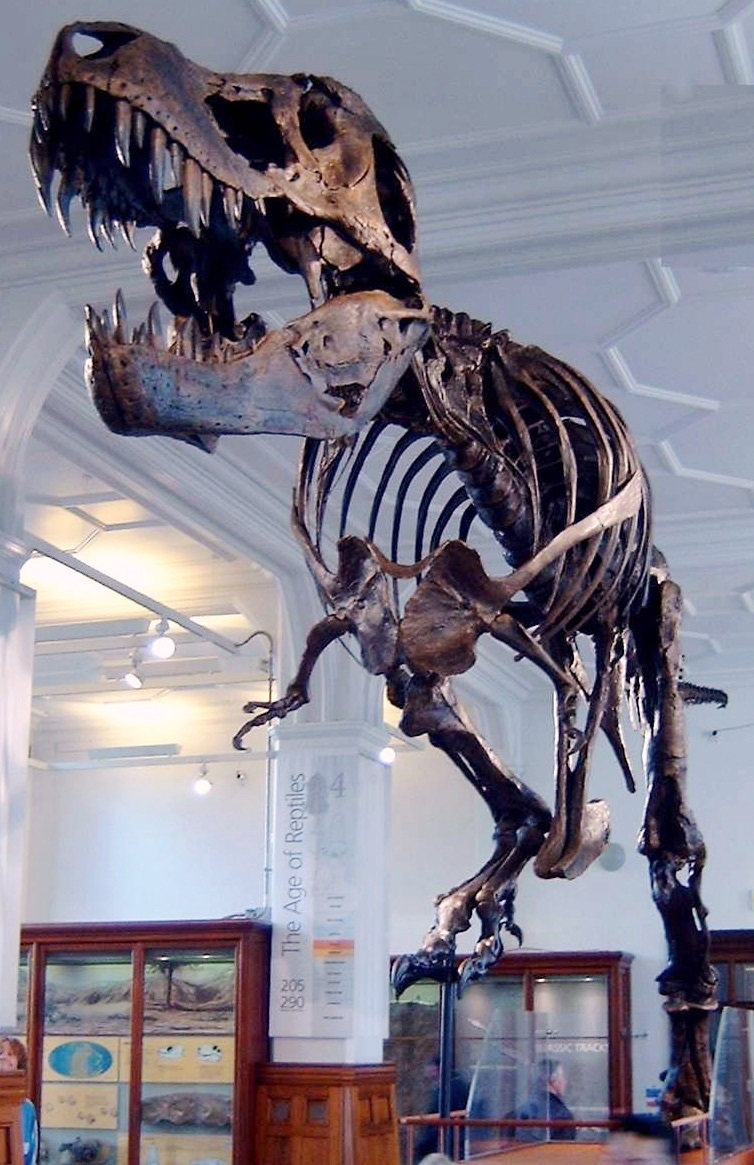
Stan, a reproduction cast of a fossilised Tyrannosaurus rex acquired by the museum in 2004.

In June 2013 time-lapse footage showing a 10-inch Egyptian statue in the museum's collection, apparently spinning around unaided, attracted worldwide media attention. Various theories were put forward, with the university's Professor Brian Cox suggesting "differential friction" between the glass shelf and the object, possibly caused by vibrations made by visitors, caused the object to move. The museum's Egyptologist Campbell Price, said "it has been on those surfaces since we have had it and it has never moved before. And why would it go around in a perfect circle?". The Manchester Evening News reported that the incident "sent visitor numbers soaring at the Manchester Museum", and Tim Manley, head of marketing and communications, commented that "There's been a definite spike in visitors".

Nature's Library opened in April 2013 displaying the museum's range of natural history, using a design inspired by a Gothic library to capitalise on the gallery's Gothic Revival architecture. Displays explore the variety of the natural world, where the collection came from, why people collect specimens, how they are used, and what they can tell scientists.

In 2004 the museum acquired a reproduction cast of a fossil Tyrannosaurus rex which is mounted in a running posture. "Stan", as it is called, is based on the second most complete T. rex excavated in 1992 in South Dakota, by Stan Sacrison.

Alchemy was a project initiating and facilitating artists' access to the museum and university. Funded by Arts Council England it offered four Alchemy Artist Fellowships, curated artist interventions in the permanent galleries and facilitated research and the loan of the museum's collections for contemporary art projects. Alchemy was the museum's first such sustained research programme. It aimed to reinvigorate displays, encourage diverse approaches and present alternative voices.

In August 2007, a temporary exhibition Myths About Race was opened. Many Victorian institutions are now viewed as having contributed to the racist thinking that justified slavery. As part of the Revealing Histories: Remembering Slavery project, it explored difficult and sensitive issues.

Lindow Man was on display for a year from April 2008, on loan from the British Museum.

== Collections ==
=== Anthropology ===
The collection totals about 16,000 artefacts, nearly half of which are from Africa. Material from Oceania makes up a quarter and much of the remainder comes from Asia and the Americas. The first large donation came from Robert Dukinfield Darbishire (1826–1908), beginning in 1904/05. Darbishire gave about 700 items, including ceramics from Peru and Eskimo carvings. In 1922, Charles Heape donated his Oceanian and American collection, amounting to about 1500 items. It included a collection of weapons and paddles from the Pacific islands, collected by missionaries and others. Some items from Aboriginal Australians of Victoria, Australia were acquired while Heape was resident. The Lloyd collection of Japanese metalwork, carvings and ceramics were the bequest of R. W. Lloyd. There are two collections obtained in the field by professional anthropologists. Frank Willett collected pottery, masks and ritual regalia in Nigeria in 1956 and Peter Worsley collected basketry and other items from the Wanindiljaugwa people of Groote Eylandt, Australia in 1952.

=== Archaeology ===
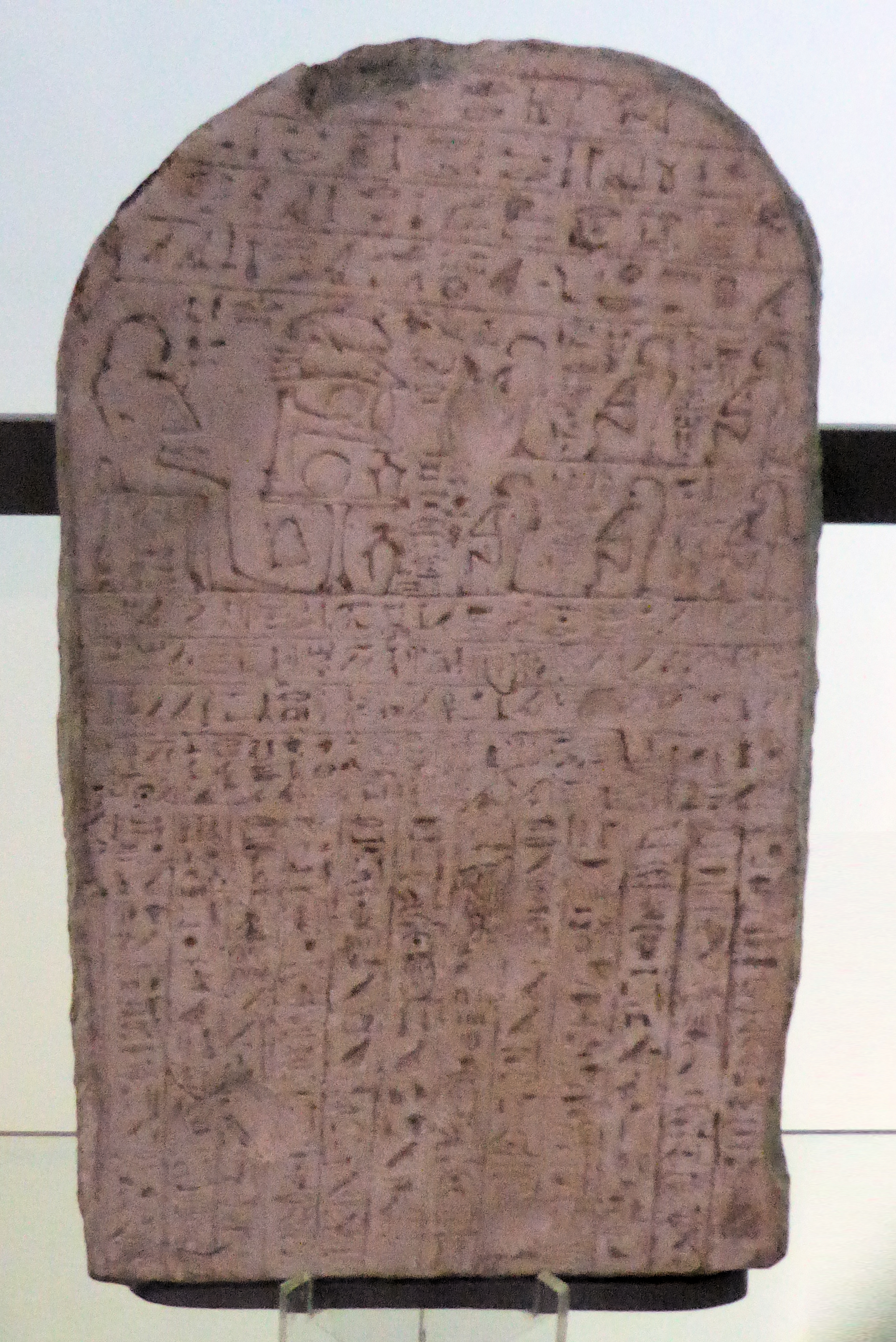
The Sebek-khu Stele, which records the earliest known Egyptian military campaign in Retjenu, including Sekmem (s-k-m-m, thought to be Shechem).

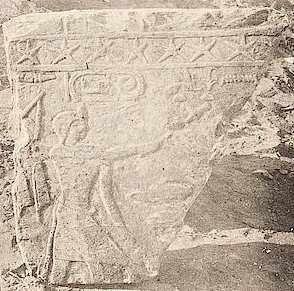
Relief of Pepi II from the temple of Menes and Isis in Qift, part of the museum's Egyptological collection

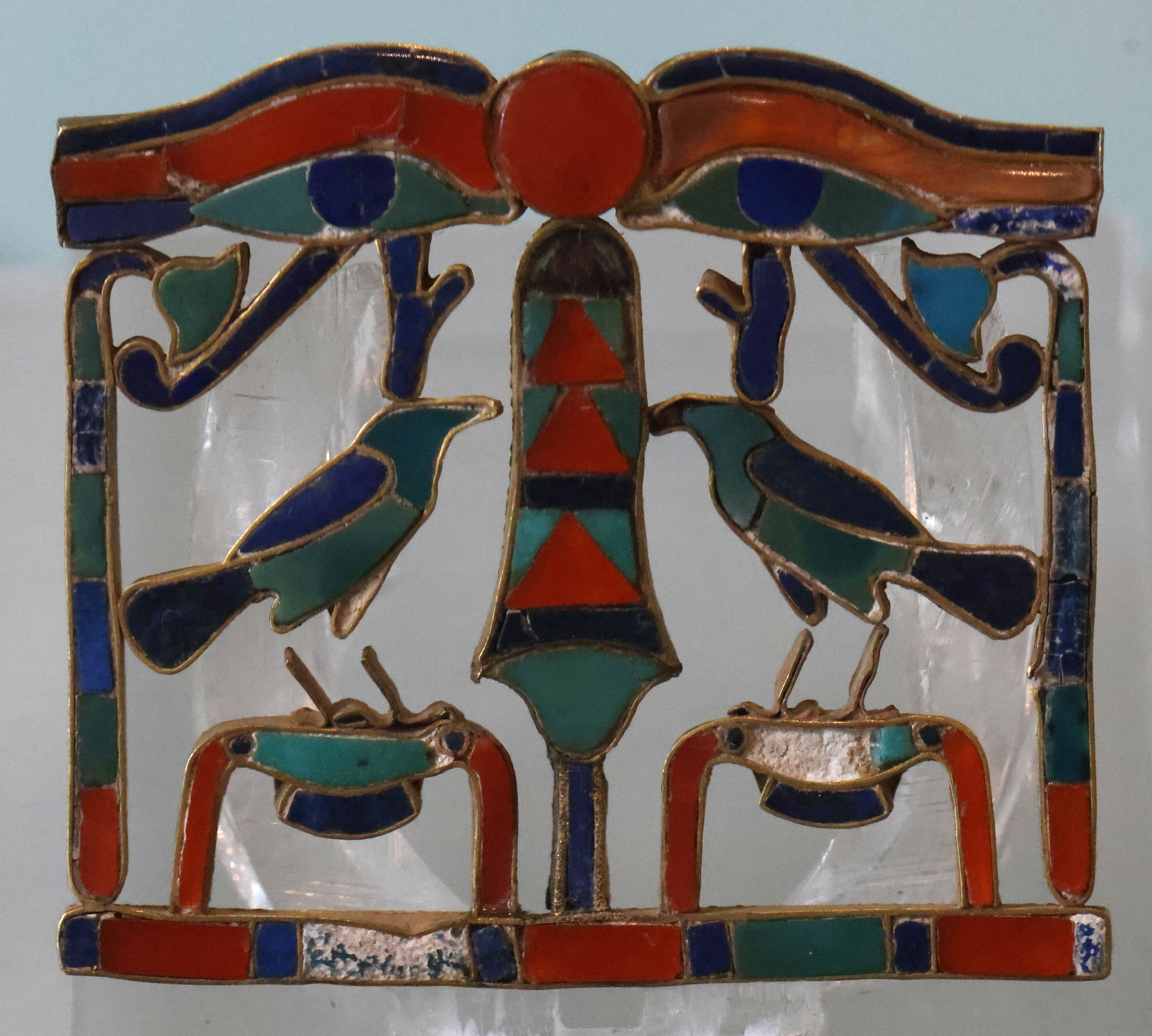
The Riqqeh tomb stela from the 19th century BCE.

The major collecting areas in archaeology have been Western Europe, the Mediterranean, Egypt and Western Asia. Large accessions of material from Egypt and Western Asia came from the excavations of Sir Flinders Petrie and subsequently archaeologists from the university have been involved in expeditions to Western Asia and brought more finds. The Egyptological collections include finds from Kahun and Gurob, presented in 1890 by Jesse Haworth and Martyn Kennard. By 1912 the growth of this area had been so great that a new wing was added for the Egyptian material to which Jesse Haworth made a major donation of funds. Its first keeper was Winifred M. Crompton.

The Egyptian Mummy Research Project, begun in 1973 under Rosalie David's direction, has yielded much information on health and social conditions in ancient Egypt and radiology and endoscopy have been used extensively. One of the mummies studied was the first mummy to be completely unwrapped in Britain since 1908. This was mummy no. 1770 in 1975. From 1979 the researchers developed non-destructive techniques by a combination of radiology and endoscopy. The results are held on the International Mummy Data Base, stored on the university computer. A redesign of the galleries in 1984/85 resulted in improved displays. The archaeology collections were redisplayed in 2011 in the Ancient Worlds galleries. A bog body, Worsley Man, is also in the care of the museum. Lindow Man, another bog body had previously been displayed.

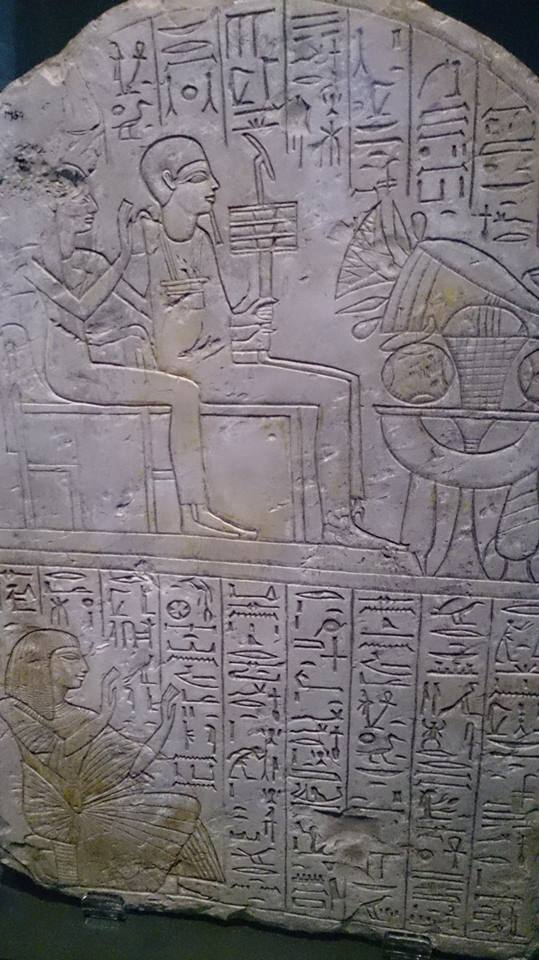
Hieroglyphs on a funerary stela in Manchester Museum

=== Archery ===
The nucleus of the archery collection of about 2,000 exhibits was formed by Ingo Simon and donated in 1946. Simon was an accomplished archer who spent many years researching its history and the development of bows. From 1914 to 1933 he held the world record for a flight-shot at 462 yards; he died in 1964 and his widow Erna (lady world champion, 1937, died 1973) endowed a trust to conserve and develop the collection which includes artefacts from Great Britain, Brazil, Europe, India, Pakistan, Japan, Central Asia, Africa, and the Pacific islands. Inger K. Frith, President of the Fédération Internationale de Tir à l'Arc from 1961 to 1977, was very involved in the curation and setting up of the collection.

=== Botany ===
The Manchester Herbarium contains upwards of 950,000 specimens collected during the 18th, 19th and 20th centuries and most countries are represented. Accessions are still made and many specialist enquiries are received. Only a small part of the collection is exhibited. Important contributions came from Charles Bailey and James Cosmo Melvill and some specimens from Carolus Linnæus, the expeditions of Charles Darwin and Admiral Sir John Franklin are included. The small collection made by Leopold H. Grindon which includes many cultivated plants is also important.

=== Earth sciences ===
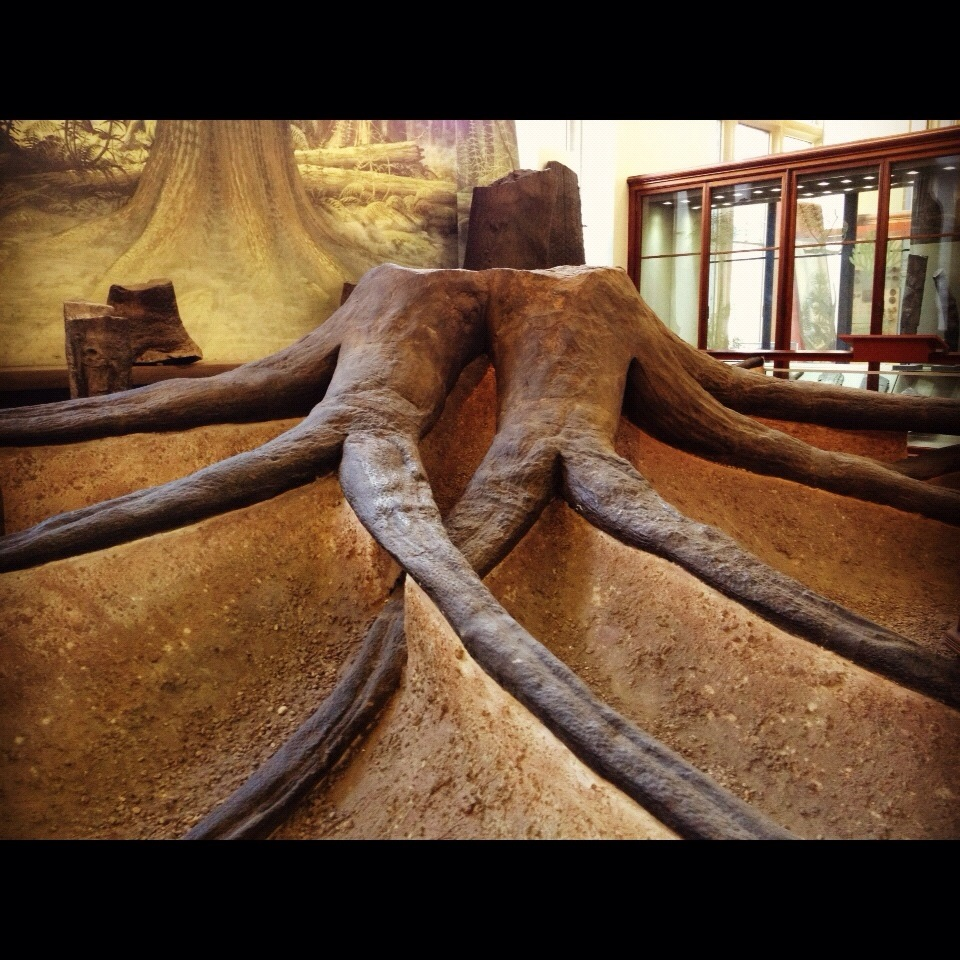
A tree root fossil from Yorkshire

The geological collections are of more than local importance and consist of more than 9,000 mineralogical specimens and several hundred thousand fossils. Approximately one twentieth of the collection is displayed and the remainder in storage but available for study by interested persons. Much of the collecting was done in the second half of the 19th century and among the collections are the David Homfray collection from the Cambrian and Ordovician strata of Wales and the collections of George H. Hickling and D. M. S. Watson from the Silurian of the Dudley district, West Midlands and from the Old Red Sandstone. Other specimens include the fossilised plants of the Coal Measures, the S. S. Buckman collection of ammonites, an ichthyosaur from Whitby and 40,000 mammalian bones from an excavation at Creswell Crags, Derbyshire and the David Forbes World Collection of minerals. Since the 1920s there has been a policy of complementary collecting by the museum and the university Department of Geology by which the museum specialises in hard rock petrology. The museum's collection of zeolite group minerals originated from a donation by Caroline Birley in 1894.

=== Entomology ===
The museum's collection amounts to nearly 3 million specimens. It has 10,500 type specimens (of 2,300 species) and additions are frequently made to it. Coleoptera represent about half the total number of specimens. The British collections constitute about 1,250,000 specimens and only a small proportion of the known species are unrepresented. Harry Britten, assistant keeper 1918–1938, had a leading role in the development of the collection. Coleoptera, Diptera and Hymenoptera specimens amount to some 1,100,000 in total. Of the Manchester moth (Euclemensia woodiella) captured on Kersal Moor in 1829, one of only three specimens known to be in existence is here. The remainder of the collection is of foreign origin and W. D. Hincks and John R. Dibb contributed great quantities of specimens, particularly of Coleoptera. Coleoptera number some 900,000 out of an approximate total 1,750,000. The Chrysomedinae-Cassidinae collection of Franz Spaeth is among the finest collections of tortoise-beetles.

=== Numismatic collection ===
The first coins were donated by the businessman Reuben Spencer in 1895 and the rest of his collection of European coins and commemorative medals in various metals was donated in instalments. Alfred Güterbock deposited, then bequeathed a collection of 380 Greek gold, silver and copper coins together with some Roman coins. In the next forty years four benefactions were made: in 1912 from William Smith Churchill (European coins of the 17th, 18th and 19th centuries); in 1925 William Smith Ogden's collection of antiquities, including Greek and Roman coins; in 1939 Egbert Steinthal, honorary keeper of the coin room, presented his collection of English copper coins; and in 1958 Harold Raby's bequest of Greek and Roman coins. Harold Raby succeeded Steinthal as honorary keeper and they were responsible for work on the arrangement and identification of the coins. The museum also holds the Great Jackson Street Hoard a hoard of 26 Roman coins found in Manchester near the junction of Chester Road and Great Jackson Street at some point in the 1890s. The hoard is unusual for British hoards in that 19 of the coins were struck in third century Alexandria.

=== Amphibians ===
The museum's collection of live amphibians, housed in the Vivarium, includes some of the most critically endangered neotropical species in the world. The Vivarium's displays offer an opportunity to observe the behaviour of a wide variety of species from Madagascar, South and Central America, and Australasia, in naturalistic exhibits. The maintenance of the museum's live animals operates under the highest Zoo Licence standards to ensure their health and care is optimised. A conservation research collection of rare neotropical frogs is maintained off display. These form part of non-invasive research projects and captive breeding programmes to support the in-situ and ex-situ conservation of the species concerned. These include the Lemur Leaf Frog, the Yellow-eyed Leaf Frog, and the Splendid Leaf Frog. The live collection at the museum is used as an important educational resource, and related engagement work extends to environmental education programmes developed in Costa Rica and Panama.

=== Mammals ===
The collection includes several thousand mammal specimens. Many mounted specimens are from the original Manchester Natural History Society collection. Mounted mammals include a lowland gorilla, an aye aye, and a red panda collected by Brian Houghton Hodgson. Most mammal groups are represented. Mr Potter's cow is a member of the British White breed from the extinct Gisburne herd from the 1830s. The museum holds a number of examples of taxidermy by Rowland Ward for Maurice Egerton (Lord Egerton of Tatton Park). The collection includes bones and skulls of a wide range of mammals, covering most major groups. Many of the collections were transferred from the Anatomy Department in the 1980s. The museum holds the bone collection put together by Derek Yalden.

=== Birds ===
The collection includes approximately 15,000 bird study skins from more than 2,000 species mostly from 1850 to 1950. A collections of birds was transferred from the Natural History Museum in 1895, including a warbler finch collected by Charles Darwin on the Galapagos in 1835. The bird skin collection of Henry Eeles Dresser acquired in 1895 includes Palaearctic bird species, bee-eaters and rollers that formed the basis of Dresser's books. The bird skin collection of approximately 7,500 specimens includes specimens that John Gerrard Keulemans and Joseph Wolf used to prepare illustrations for 'A History of the Birds of Europe'. Dresser was a member of the British Ornithologists' Union and the Zoological Society of London. His collection includes specimens from Nikolai Prjevalsky, Robert Swinhoe, Henry Tristram, Alfred Wallace and Henry Seebohm. A collection of birds from the Hawaiian Islands was received from the Royal Society in the 1890s including species that are now extinct. The museum holds the collections of Thomas Coward, Richard Spiers Standen and Robert Coombes who specialised in Eurasian goose species; this collection was acquired in the 1990s. The collection of bones includes many bird skulls. The collection formed by Derek Yalden includes skeletons of thousands of birds that were sexed. The egg collection includes approximately 10,000 sets of eggs.

Notable specimens include a male and female huia, bones of the dodo, an elephant bird egg, the only known egg of the slender-billed curlew, two study skins, a mount and several eggs of the passenger pigeon, bones of the great auk, a male and female ivory-billed woodpecker, three specimens of the paradise parrot and a warbler finch collected by Charles Darwin.

=== Corals ===
The museum has many specimens of coral that came from Sydney Hickson, a specialist on corals and one-time Professor of Zoology at the University of Manchester. These include a number of type specimens of names published by Hickson and others, including Stanley Gardiner.

=== Bryozoa ===
The museum holds the bryozoa collection of Arthur Waters, a naturalist who lived near Manchester. Waters described the bryozoa of the Challenger expedition. The collection includes approximately 10,000 specimens including hundreds of type specimens. The museum also holds the bryozoa collection of Eliza Jelly, another eminent 19th-century bryozoologist.

=== Molluscs ===
The museum has the fourth largest mollusc collection in Britain with 166,000 lots. The collection grew around that of the Manchester Society for the Promotion of Natural History, which acquired one of William Swainson's shell collections in 1825 and which also included the collection of Captain Thomas Brown. Catalogue of type specimens was published in 2008.

Type material is found in the collections of Alexander Abercrombie (India), Robert Dukinfield Darbishire, Professor Alfred Cort Haddon (Torres Straits), Reverend James Hadfield (Lifu, Loyalty Islands), Lewis John Shackleford (especially Marginella), George Cooper Spence (especially African land snails and Urocoptis and many specimens from Matthew William Kemble Connolly and Hugh Berthon Preston), Frederick W. Townsend (Persian Gulf), syntype material from the Scottish National Antarctic Expedition (1902–1904) and that received from the Smithsonian Institution in 1973 in an exchange. Material from the collections of Alexander Abercrombie, Alfred Cort Haddon, Rev. James Hadfield, Lewis John Shackleford, Frederick W. Townsend and the Scottish National Antarctic Expedition was described by James Cosmo Melvill II who had close connections with the museum; many species were described with Robert Standen of the museum.

=== Spirit collection ===
The collection includes around 5,000 spirit specimens (wet specimens) from the 19th and early 20th century, although more recent acquisitions include the alligator collection formed by Professor Mark Ferguson of the Faculty of Life Sciences and Renovo plc.

=== Microscope slides ===
The collection includes the foraminifera collection of Frederick Pearcey, who served on the Challenger Expedition and worked at one time in the museum. Other collections of forams come from Joseph Sidebotham and E. Halkyard.

== Repatriation of artefacts ==
In late October 2019 the first collection of many sacred artefacts belonging to Indigenous Australian peoples held in US museums were returned by Illinois State Museum to Australia. This was the first phase of the project coinciding with the 250th anniversary of Captain James Cook's first voyage to Australia in 2020, working to repatriate a large number of artefacts from foreign museums. The next phase of the project is to bring back 40 culturally significant objects from the Manchester Museum, including "body ornaments made from feathers, teeth and wood, hair bundles and belts". These would be returned to the Aranda, Yukulta / Ganggalidda, Garawa, Nyamal and Yawuru peoples. In November 2019 the Museum returned 43 secret sacred and ceremonial items from Aboriginal and Torres Strait Islanders communities back to Australia.

In September 2023, Manchester Museum returned 174 artefacts to Indigenous Australian people, encouraging cultural institutions to "recognize harm but also encourage healing". The director for culture and emergencies at UNESCO, Krista Pikkat, said "May this occasion be a source of inspiration, encouraging others to embark on similar journeys." The Anindilyakwa women attending the ceremony at the Museum received objects from the collection including carvings, baskets, decorations and a major collection of shell dolls.

== Notable members of staff ==
- Tristram Besterman, director
- Harry Ferris Brazenor (1863–1948), taxidermist.
- Harry Britten, assistant keeper of Entomology, 1918–38
- Rosalie David, Egyptologist
- William Boyd Dawkins, geologist and archaeologist
- Michael Eagar, geologist, deputy director 1977–87
- William Evans Hoyle, Director 1889–1909
- J. Wilfrid Jackson, conchologist, archaeologist and geologist.
- Nick Merriman, director
- David Elystan Owen, Director; author of books about canals
- Barbara Pyrah, assistant keeper of geology 1965–1968
- Christina Riggs, curator of Egyptology 2004–2006
- Walter Medley Tattersall, zoologist, director 1909–22

== See also ==
- Listed buildings in Manchester-M13
