= The Whitworth =

Art gallery in Manchester, England

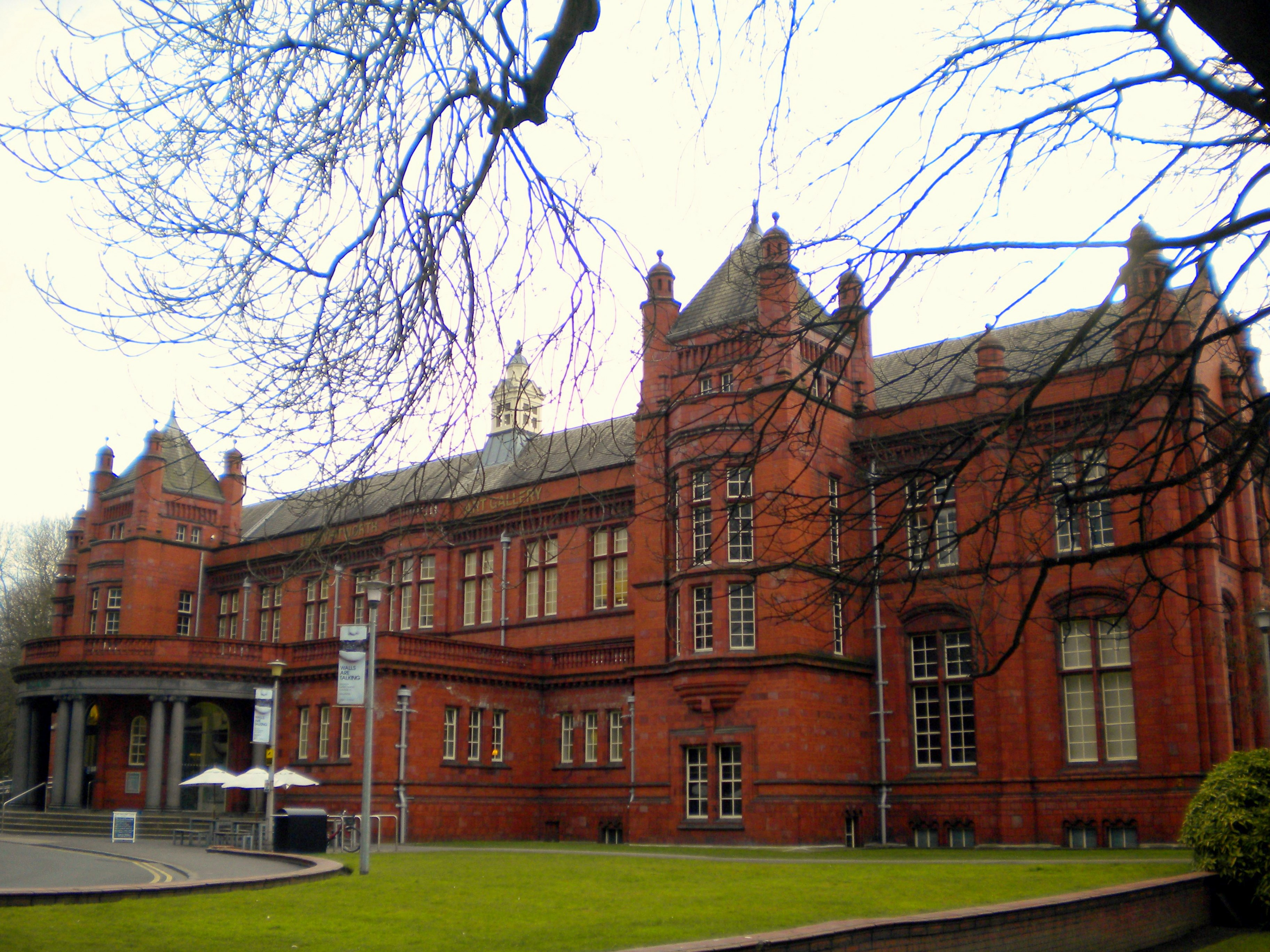
- Former name: The Whitworth Institute and Park
- Established: 1889
- Location: Manchester, England
- Coordinates: 53.460278°N 2.229444°W
- Founder: Robert Darbishire
- Director: Sook-Kyung Lee
- Owner: University of Manchester
- Website: whitworth.manchester.ac.uk

Listed Building – Grade II
- Official name: Whitworth Gallery
- Designated: 2 October 1974
- Reference no.: 1246569

The Whitworth is an art gallery in Manchester, England, containing over 60,000 items in its collections. The gallery is located in Whitworth Park and is part of the University of Manchester.

In 2015, the Whitworth reopened after it was transformed by a £15 million capital redevelopment that doubled its exhibition spaces, restored period features and opened itself up to its surrounding park. The gallery received more than 440,000 visitors in its first year and was awarded the Art Fund's Museum of the Year prize in 2015.

The Whitworth is an Accredited museum with a Designated Collection recognised by Arts Council England.

== History ==
The gallery was founded in 1889 by Robert Dukinfield Darbishire with a donation from Sir Joseph Whitworth, as "The Whitworth Institute and Park". The first building was completed in 1908. In 1958, the gallery became part of the Victoria University of Manchester.

In October 1974, the gallery became a Grade II listed building.

In October 1995, the mezzanine court in the centre of the building was opened. The new gallery, designed chiefly for the display of sculpture, won a RIBA regional award. In 2010, the art gallery received 172,000 visitors, making it one of Greater Manchester's 10 most-visited tourist attractions.

In February 2015, the Whitworth reopened after a £15 million capital redevelopment and received over 440,000 visitors in its first reopening year. It was shortlisted for the Stirling Prize and won the Art Fund's Museum of the Year in 2015.

=== 2003 theft ===
On 26 April 2003, three paintings thought to be worth a total of £4 million — Van Gogh's The Fortification of Paris with Houses, Picasso's Poverty and Gauguin's Tahitian Landscape — were stolen from the gallery. After an anonymous tip-off, they were found rolled up in a nearby public toilet with a note claiming that the motive of the theft was to highlight poor security at the gallery. The paintings were subsequently put back on display after minor repair work.

== Architecture ==
The Grade II listed gallery was built between 1895 and 1900 in a free Jacobean style to the designs of J.W. Beaumont. The gallery consisting of two storeys and a basement is constructed of red brick with bands and dressings of matching terracotta and has green slate roofs. Its nine-bay main range has two towers and a large projecting semi-circular porch with a screen of paired stone Ionic columns and a stone frieze below a balustraded parapet.

=== Refurbishment and extension ===
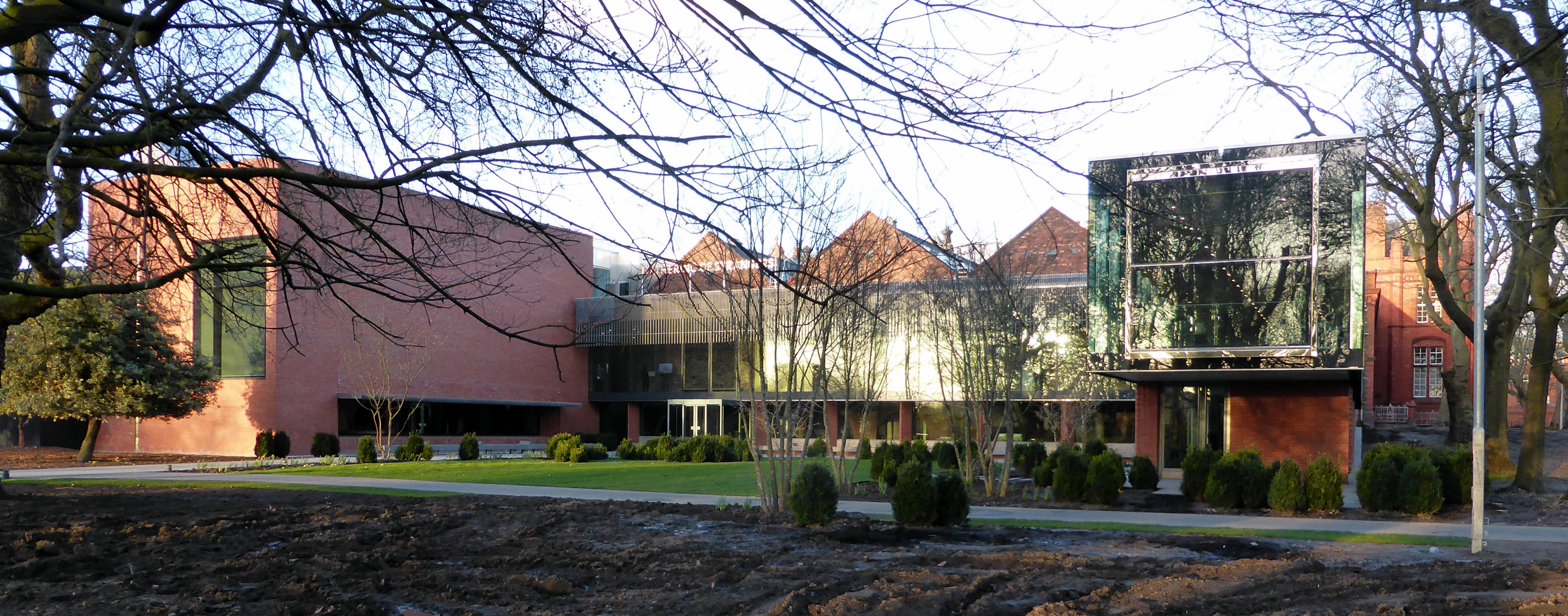
The Whitworth Gallery extension

An architectural competition was launched by RIBA Competitions to design an extension in 2008 and funding was secured in February 2011. In September 2013, the gallery closed for refurbishment and extension works. The £15 million redevelopment was supported by the Heritage Lottery Fund and the University of Manchester. The refurbishment works, undertaken by architects MUMA envisaged the gallery reopening to the public by summer 2014, but complications delayed the opening.

The development includes expanded gallery areas, a learning studio, study centre, an art garden and café. Developers have constructed a glass, stainless steel and brick extension consisting of two wings which extend into Whitworth Park from the back of the gallery building. The wings are connected by a glass promenade. The extension means the gallery is a third larger than previously.

The extension, which opened on 14 February 2015, doubled the gallery's public space. It provides more space for displaying the more than 60,000 items in the gallery's collections and links the building to Whitworth Park.

The refurbishment and extension work resulted in the development winning a RIBA National Award in 2015 and subsequently being shortlisted for the RIBA Stirling Prize.

== Collections ==
The Whitworth has notable collections of watercolours, sculptures, wallpapers and textiles, recognised as a Designated Collection by Arts Council England.

The gallery holds major historic works by Thomas Gainsborough, Alexander and John Robert Cozens, Thomas Girtin and J. M. W. Turner. Modern and contemporary artists represented in the collections include Degas, van Gogh, Gauguin, Pissarro, Picasso, Moholy-Nagy, Paul Klee, Walter Sickert, Henry Moore, Barbara Hepworth, Ford Madox Brown, Eduardo Paolozzi, Francis Bacon, William Blake, David Hockney, L. S. Lowry. One of its most famous works is the marble sculpture Genesis (1929–31) by Sir Jacob Epstein. It also houses the Musgrave Kinley Outsider Art Collection.

The Whitworth regularly organises temporary exhibitions and displays of works from the permanent collections.

== Directors ==
In June 2017, Maria Balshaw stepped down as director to take up her role as director of the Tate. Nick Merriman then became acting interim director of the Whitworth.

On 11 October 2018, it was announced that Alistair Hudson would be the new director of the Manchester Art Gallery and the Whitworth. Hudson, previously director at the Middlesbrough Institute of Modern Art (MIMA), is a co-director of the Asociación de Arte Útil.

Sook-Kyung Lee took up her role as director at the Whitworth in August 2023 and became Honorary Professor of Transcultural Curating at the University of Manchester.

== Gallery ==
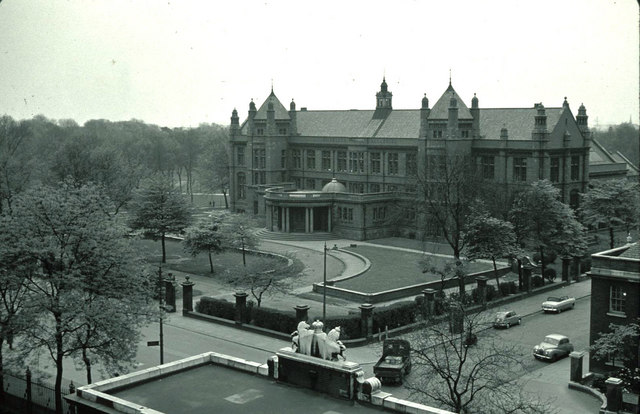
The Gallery in 1957

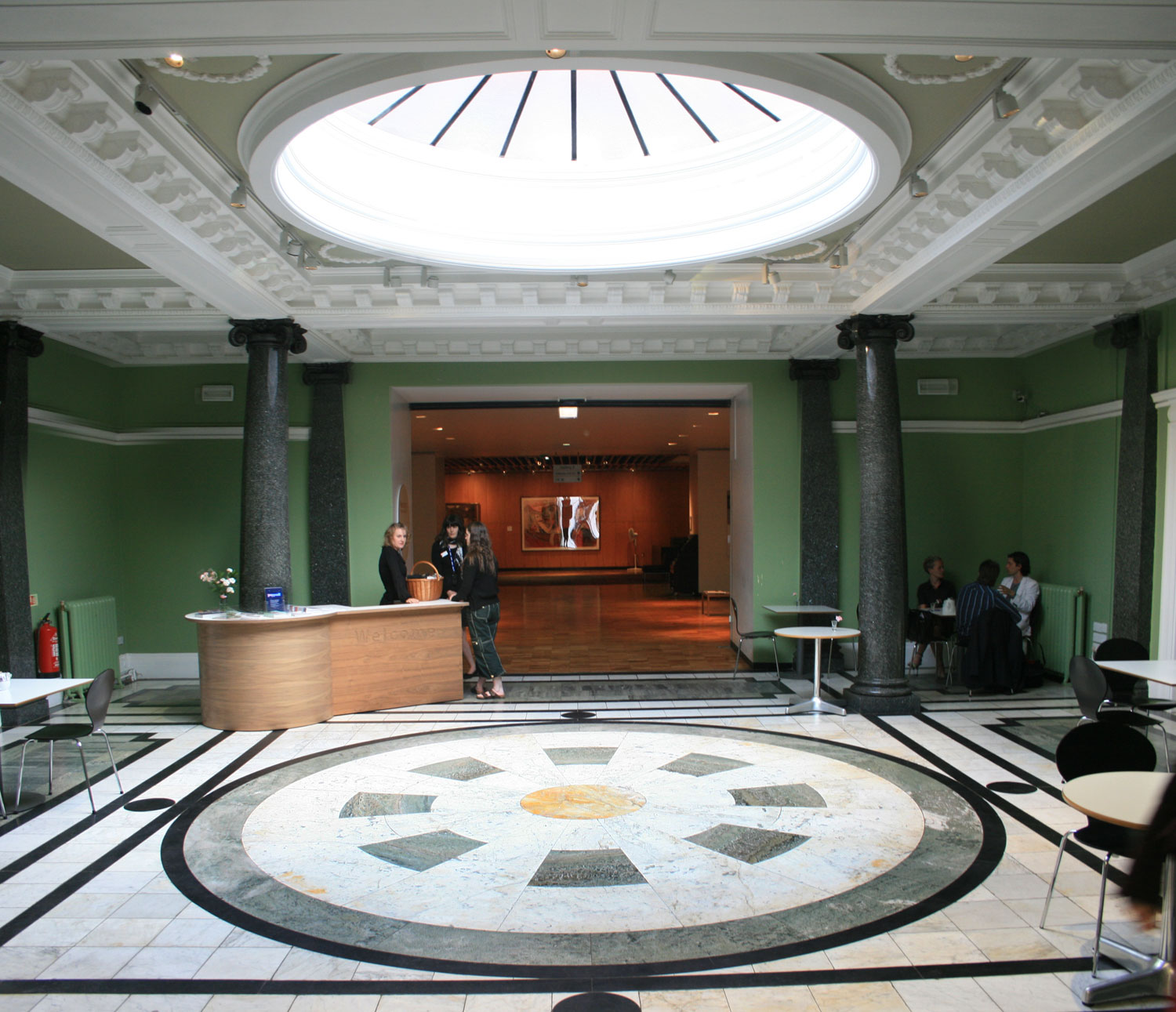
Entrance hall

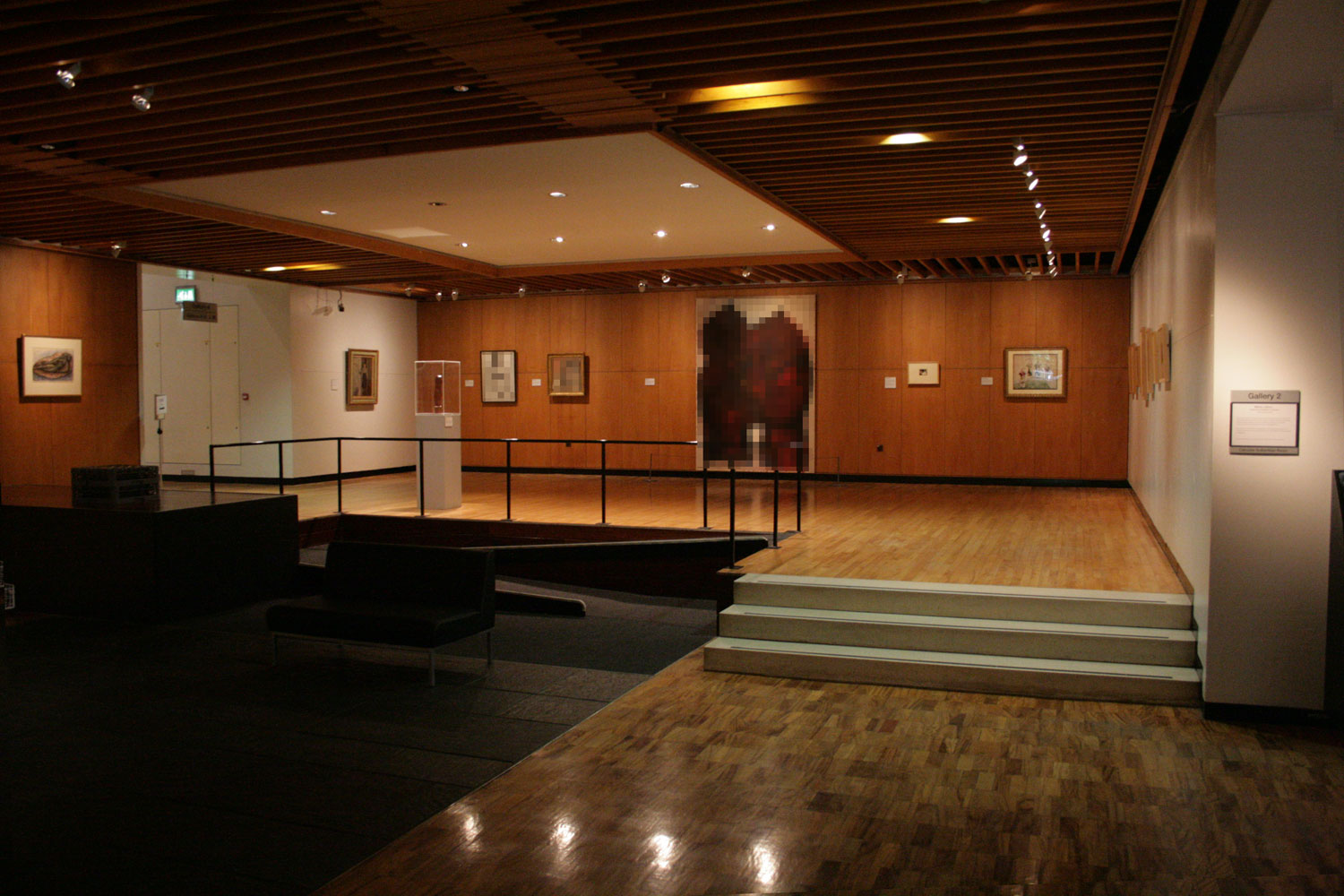
Gallery interior

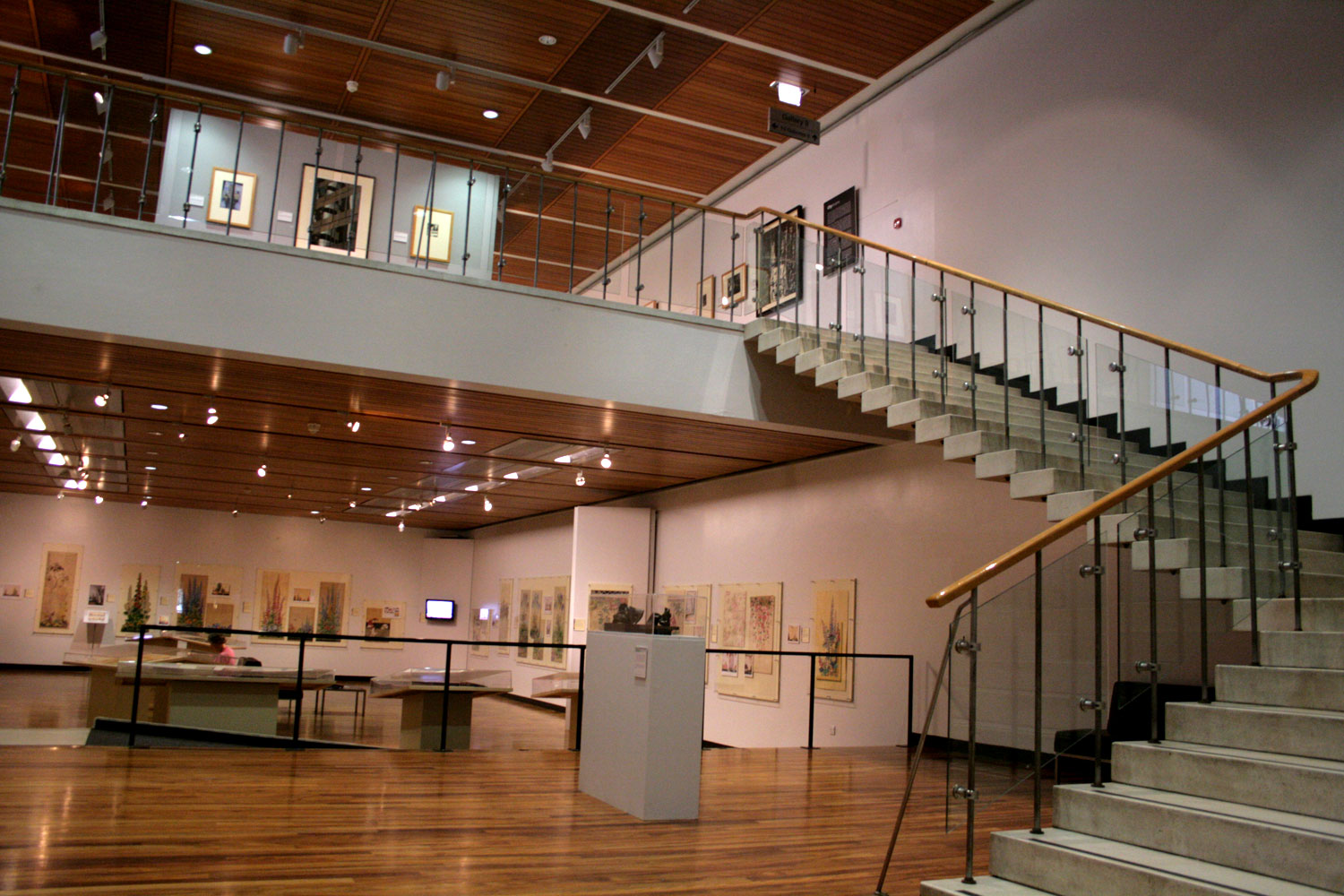
Gallery interior

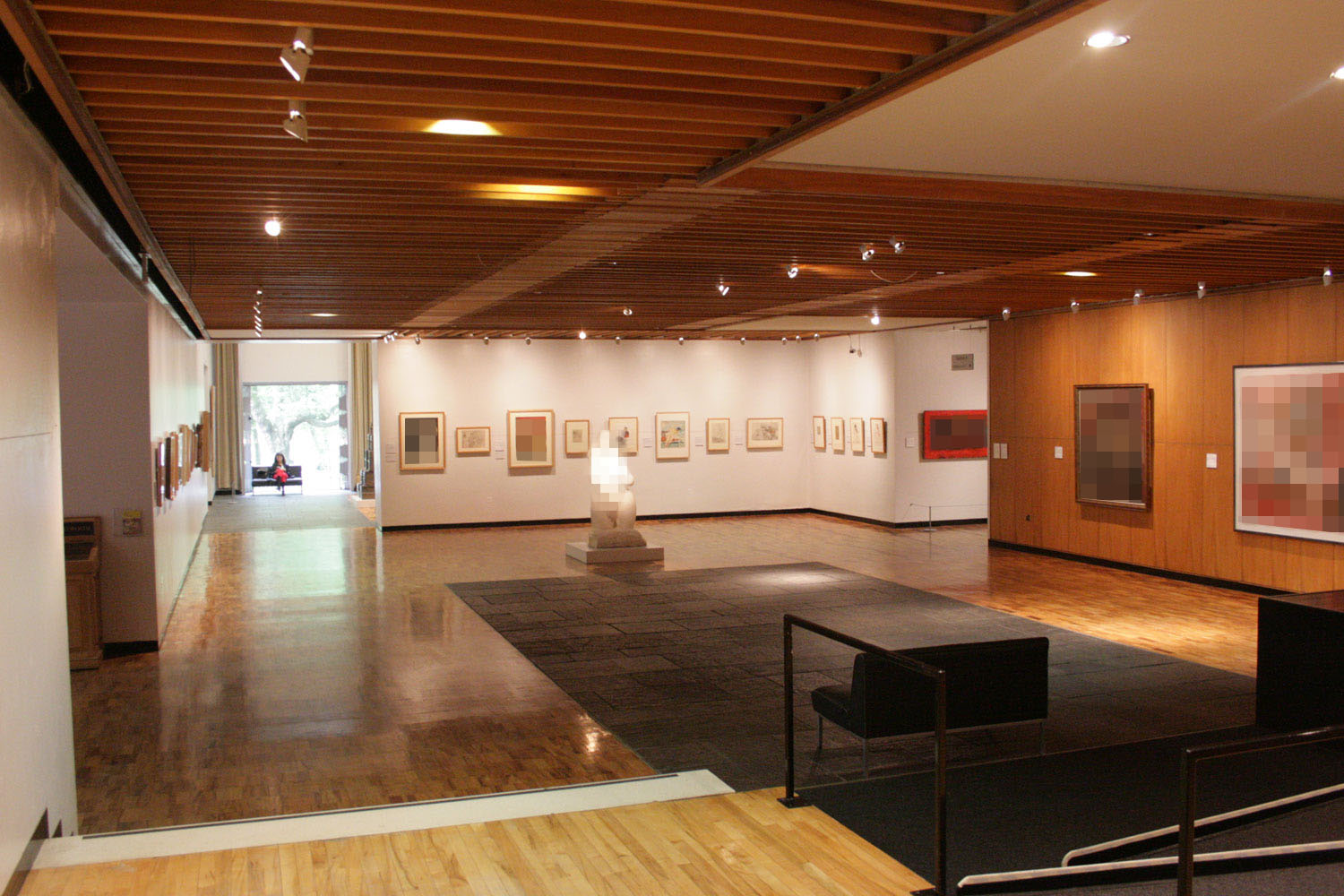
Gallery interior

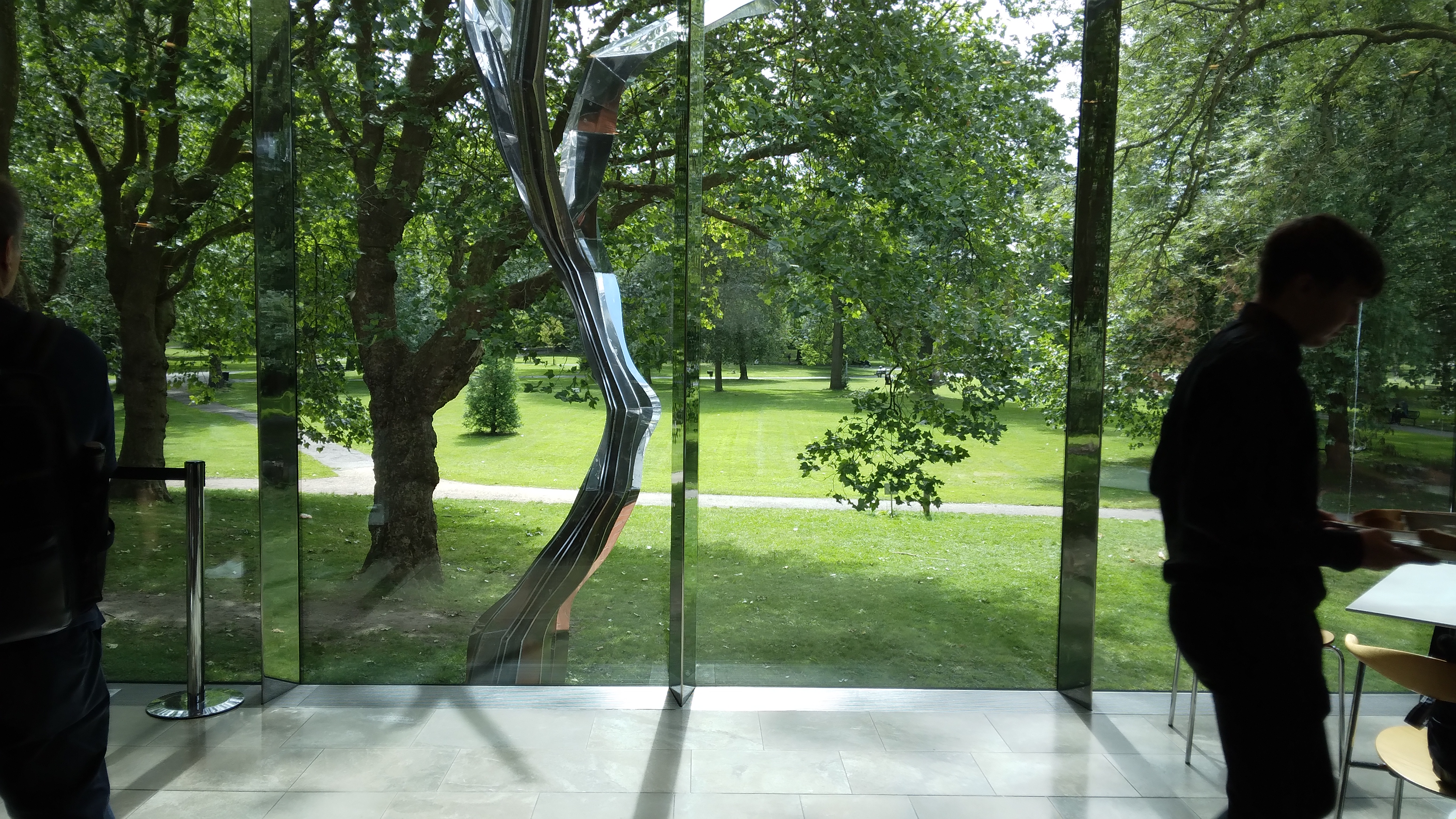
View of Whitworth Park from the interior of the art gallery, July 2023

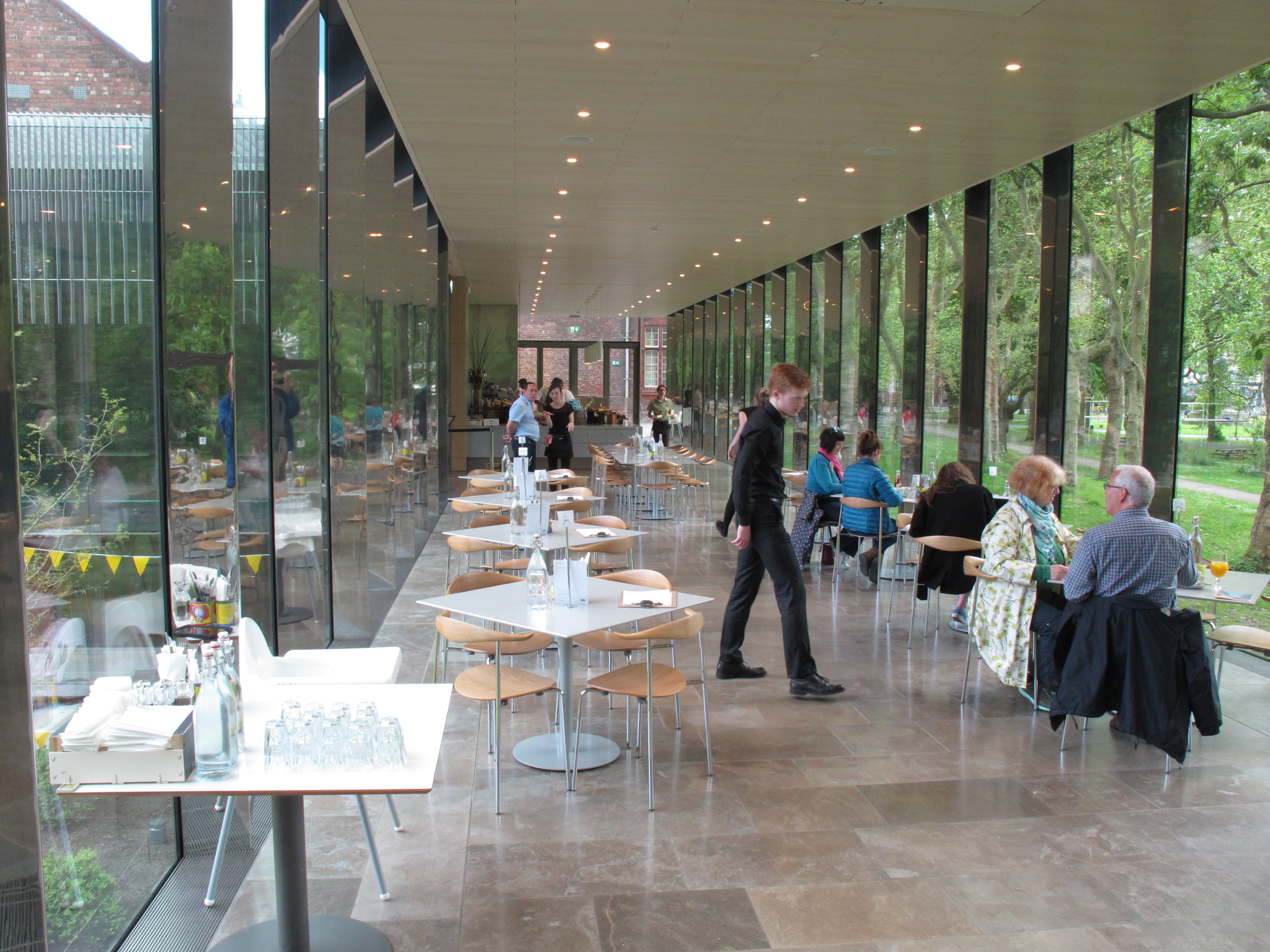
Cafe within extension interior

== See also ==
- Listed buildings in Manchester-M15
