= Rosenkranz =

Rosenkranz is the Danish and German word for rosary. The literal German meaning is 'wreath of roses'.

Rosenkranz, Rosenkrantz, Rosencrance, Rosencrans or Rosencrantz is a Germanic and Ashkenazi Jewish surname and may refer to:

== People ==
- Rosenkrantz (family), part of high aristocracy of Scandinavia and Germany
- Barbara Rosenkranz (born 1958), Austrian politician
- Carlos Rosenkrantz (born 1958), Argentine lawyer and judge
- E. Joshua Rosenkranz (born 1961), American lawyer
- Eva Rosencrans (1901–1994), American fashion designer
- Gary Rosenkrantz, American philosopher
- George Rosenkranz (1916–2019), Mexican chemist and bridge player
  - Rosenkranz double and redouble, contract bridge terms created by George
- Hans Rosencrantz (1890–1916), German flying ace
- Johann Karl Friedrich Rosenkranz (1805–1879), German philosopher
- Marcus Gjøe Rosenkrantz (1762–1838), Norwegian minister
- Nicholas Quinn Rosenkranz (born 1970), American legal scholar, son of Robert
- Pernille Rosenkrantz-Theil (born 1977), Danish politician
- Robert Rosencrans, (1927–2006), American cable television pioneer
- Robert Rosenkranz (born 1942), American businessman and philanthropist
- Timme Rosenkrantz (1911–1969), Danish author and jazz enthusiast
- Walter Rosenkranz (born 1962), Austrian politician and lawyer
- Jessica Rosencrantz (born 1987), Swedish politician

== Fictional characters ==
- One half of the duo Rosencrantz and Guildenstern in Shakespeare's Hamlet
- Rosencrantz and Guildenstern Are Dead, a 1966 play by Tom Stoppard
  - Rosencrantz and Guildenstern Are Dead (film), a 1990 film based upon the play
- Rosenkrantz Tower, a landmark in Bergen, Norway
- Rosencrantz, a fictional character in the video game Onimusha: Dawn of Dreams

== See also ==
- Rosecrans (disambiguation)
