= Rosecrans =

Rosecrans (a form of Rosenkranz) may refer to:

== People ==
- Sylvester Horton Rosecrans (1827–1878), American Roman Catholic bishop
- William Rosecrans (1819–1898), American army officer during the American Civil War

== Places ==
- Rosecrans, Illinois, an unincorporated community in Illinois, United States
- Rosecrans, Wisconsin, an unincorporated community in Wisconsin, United States

== Other ==
Note: All of the below are direct or indirect namesakes of General William Rosecrans (see above), all located in the United States.

- Rosecrans Avenue, a major east-west highway in Los Angeles and Orange Counties, California
- Rosecrans Hills, Los Angeles County, California
- Rosecrans (LACMTA station), station on the Los Angeles County Metropolitan Transit Authority System
- Fort Rosecrans National Cemetery, San Diego, California
- Rosecrans Air National Guard Base, Saint Joseph, Missouri
- Rosecrans Memorial Airport, Buchanan County, Missouri
- Rosecrans (ship), a tanker lost off the mouth of the Columbia River, on January 14, 1913 -- see Coast Guard Station Point Adams
- U.S.A.T. Rosecrans two different troop ships operated by the Army Transport Service
