= Dana Wolfe =

S. Dana Wolfe
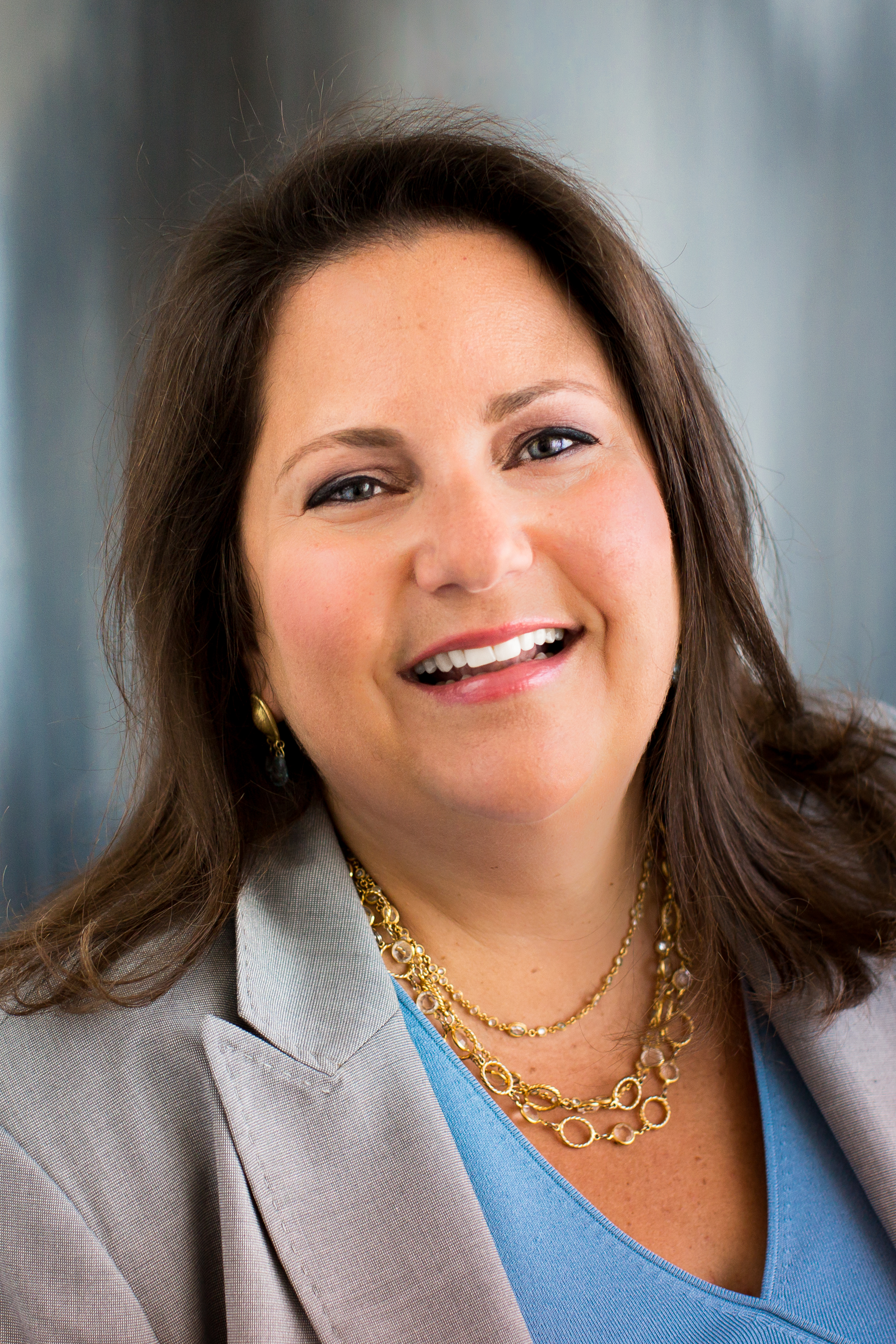
- Dana Wolfe in 2013
- Born: Vancouver, British Columbia, Canada
- Education: York University; New York University
- Occupations: Independent Media Consultant and Live Events Producer
- Website: iq2us.org

S. Dana Wolfe (born October 9, 1963) is a Canadian-born American journalist, television, film documentary, and debate producer. She has won five Emmy awards for her work in Nightline on ABC News.

== Education ==
She received a BA with honours in political science with a minor in history from York University in Toronto. She earned her master's degree in International Studies from NYU in 1987.

== Career ==
Wolfe began her television career in Toronto at CTV's Canada AM. She was the Assistant Managing Editor at the Washington D.C. based foreign policy journal The National Interest.

Wolfe worked as a producer for Ted Koppel’s Nightline on ABC News for close to a dozen years, from 1990-2001. During this period, Wolfe conducted interviews with leading newsmakers, heads of state, and celebrities, including Salman Rushdie, Henry Kissinger, Madeleine Albright, Yasser & Suha Arafat, and Yitzhak Rabin. She received 5 Emmy Awards for news stories.

After a few years as independent media consultant, Wolfe helped found Intelligence Squared U.S.(IQ2US) an Oxford University style debate forum, together with Robert Rosenkranz of the Rosenkranz Foundation. The idea was to provide an in-depth view of both sides on any given issue and Wolfe claims that she was very influenced by Ted Koppel, who made an effort to include civil discourse in Nightline.

The first debate was held in September 2006 and included topics such as: "Obesity is the government’s business,” and “Too many kids go to college," "Would the World Be Better Off Without Religion?". While she was there, they received 5 radio awards. In April 2023 it changed its name to Open to Debate, after Wolfe had left.

=== Advisory and research positions ===
Since 2015 she has served on the board of Retro Report, a documentary news organization which concentrates on making short documentaries about current events and distributing them to schools, TV programs (such as PBS) and other venues.

In 2018, she joined the advisory board of the Global Reporting Centre, based at the University of British Columbia. The Centre collaborates with reporters and media organizations to spearhead ways to produce solutions-oriented journalism.

Wolfe is also a contributing editor at InTELLects, an online forum founded by Michelle Horowitz and Kendall Jane Meade that interviews thought leaders through questions and answers.

Wolfe was a Visiting Fellow at the SNF Agora Institute at Johns Hopkins University in 2019-2020. The Institute, named after the ancient Greek agora, or public debate area, aims to create an environment where people of difference views can collaborate to address issues. While at the Institute, she taught a course examining the history of U.S. debate and debate techniques, In Search of Intelligent Debate.

== Documentary films ==
In 2020, Wolfe served as editorial producer for the documentary film and five-part series Lebanon: Borders of Blood. Produced by Zygote Films and winner of six Israeli Television and Motion Pictures Academy Awards, including Best Documentary Series, Borders of Blood examines the decades of unrest and tragedy that has plagued Lebanon since the mid-1970s, using interviews with over one hundred people who talk about their experiences of the historical events.

Wolfe is also editorial producer and researcher for The Cassandra Prophecy, a 2022 documentary that tells the little-known story of a U.S. Drug Enforcement Administration (DEA) task force investigating the billion dollar cocaine trafficking and money laundering activities of Hezbollah.

== Awards ==
=== Emmy awards ===
- 1994 National News and Documentary Emmy Award Honors, Outstanding instant coverage of a single breaking news story, Nightline “The End of the Search for O.J. Simpson”
- 1995 News and documentary Emmy Award, Outstanding instant coverage of a single breaking news story, Nightline, "Oklahoma City Bombing: Moment of Crisis"
- 1996 News and documentary Emmy Award, Outstanding general coverage of a single breaking news story (program), Nightline, “Anatomy of the Unabomber Suspect's Arrest”
- 1998 National News breaking news story Emmy Award, Nightline, “Crisis in the White House: The President Visits the Heartland”
- 1999 News and Documentary Emmy Award, Outstanding Coverage of a Breaking News Story, Nightline, "Lessons Learned: A Jonesboro Town Meeting"

=== IQ2US awards ===
IQ2US and Wolfe received several radio and television awards.

==== New York Festivals Best Radio awards ====
- 2013 "Best Public Affairs Program" on radio.
- 2014 Bronze Best Radio Program for Intelligence Squared
- 2015 Silver Radio Award for Best Public Affairs Program for Presidential War Powers
- 2015 Silver Radio Award for Best Public Affairs Program for Embrace Common Core
- 2015 Bronze Radio Award for Best Regularly Scheduled Talk Program for Legalize Assisted Suicide.

==== Television ====
- 2012 Silver Telly Award for Intelligence Squared U.S., TV/Political/Commentary
- 2013 Bronze Telly Award for TV/Political/Commentary, Intelligence Squared U.S.
- 2013 Silver Telly Award for Live Events, Intelligence Squared U.S.

=== Other awards ===
- Alfred I. Dupont – Columbia University Award for excellence in broadcast journalism presented to: ABC News, Nightline Special Programs, The State vs. Simpson: The Verdict; Journey of a country Doctor; Town Meeting: Thou Shall Not Kill, 1995–1996, Dana Wolfe, Producer
- 2014 Association for Women in Communications Clarion Award for Radio Regular Feature Program, Intelligence Squared U.S.

== Personal life ==
Wolfe lives in Toronto, Ontario, with husband Scott Rocco of MSNBC.
