= Open to Debate =

American non-profit media group

Open to Debate Foundation
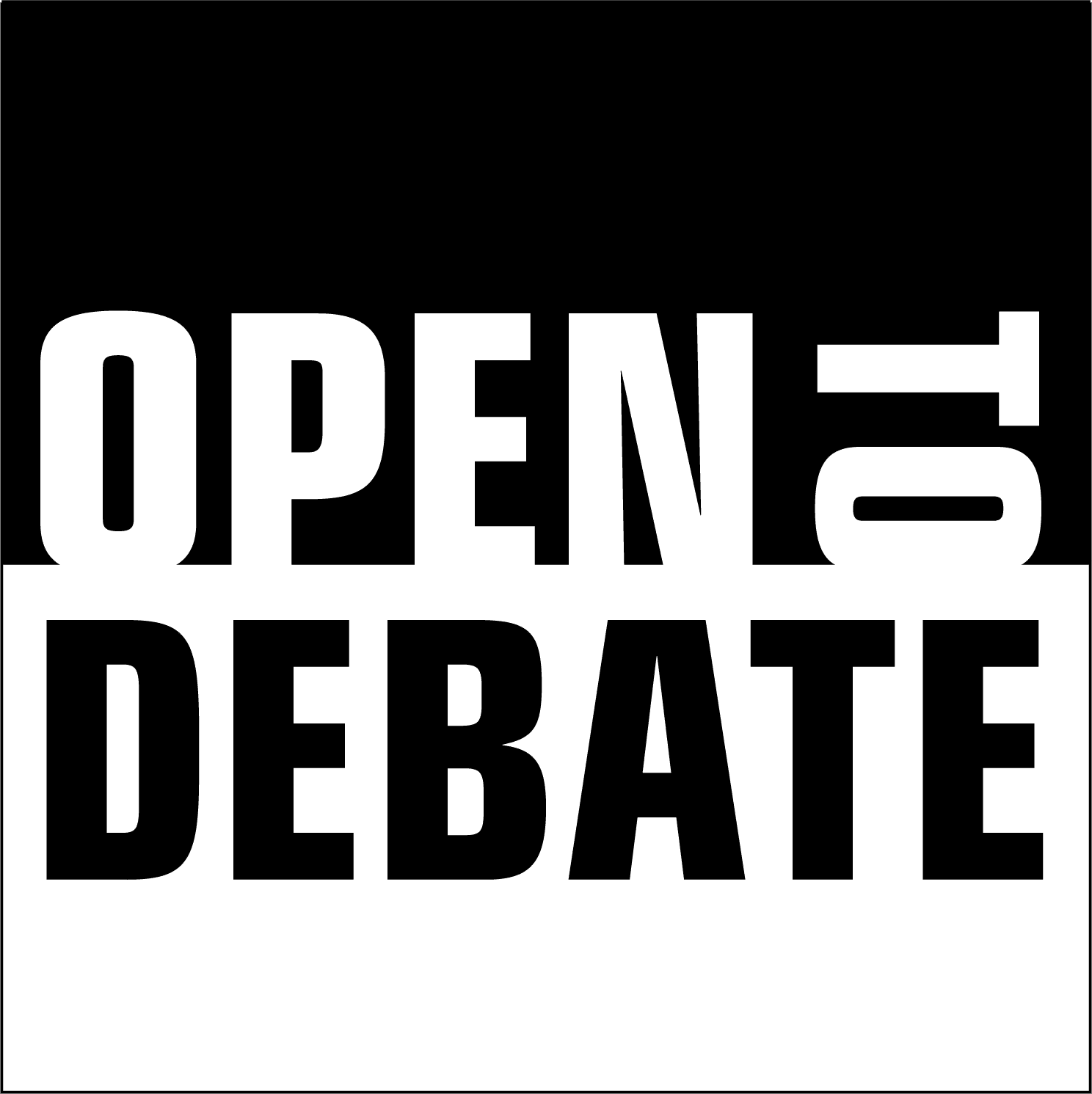
- Open to Debate Foundation Logo
- Founded: 2006 in New York City, United States
- Founder: Robert Rosenkranz
- CEO: Lia Matthow
- Industry: Nonprofit Media
- Website: opentodebate.org

Open to Debate Foundation, formerly Intelligence Squared U.S., is a nonpartisan, nonprofit media group that produces nationally broadcast debates and conversations spanning technology, law, global affairs, culture, science, medicine, and public policy issues. The mission of the organization is to "address the extreme polarization of our nation and our politics" and "restore critical thinking, facts, reason, and civility to American public discourse".

Open to Debate has produced more than 200 live debates since 2006, when it was the U.S. division of the London based media group Intelligence Squared. In 2019, it hosted the first debate ever between an artificial intelligence and a human being, in partnership with IBM's "Project Debater".

Open to Debate episodes have been broadcast on NPR since 2007, in addition to Bloomberg Television, BBC, PBS, Newsy, C-SPAN, and education streaming platform Wondrium.

In April 2023, Intelligence Squared U.S. changed its name to Open to Debate to reflect their shift toward a model of open discussion which they hoped would help combat rising levels of polarization in US politics.

== Founding ==
Open to Debate was founded in 2006, originally named Intelligence Squared U.S., by philanthropist Robert Rosenkranz as a nonprofit organization based on Intelligence Squared in the UK. Dana Wolfe, previously of Ted Koppel's Nightline, joined as Executive Producer. It was created as a distinctly nonpartisan, nonprofit institution with a mission to "raise the level of public discourse" in America. Based in New York City, Open to Debate produces a weekly debate program that is broadcast as a radio program, podcast, and digital video. Open to Debate hosts debates around the country and partners with a variety of institutions in the private and public sectors.

== Programming ==
Open to Debate programs a variety of debate formats, including Oxford-Style inspired by the Oxford Union, Unresolved, Agree-To-Disagree, and interviews on American public discourse trends. In the traditional Oxford-style debate format, two teams of two are assembled to debate a sharply framed resolution and the debate is conducted in three rounds: opening remarks, a cross examination and live audience Q&A, and closing remarks. In the "Unresolved" format, which the organization created, up to five participants can debate and change their mind from one resolution to another.

== Activism on US presidential debates ==
Open to Debate has called for the need to "fix the presidential debates" since 2016. The organization launched a petition and media campaign calling on the Commission on Presidential Debates to reform the debate formats that are presented to the American public. The petition called on Americans to support an initiative to change the format of the Presidential debates, and garnered more than 60,000 signatures and millions of engagements on YouTube and across social media.

In 2017, Open to Debate was a co-sponsor of the 2017 New York City mayoral election debates, broadcast on NY1.

During the 2020 election, Open to Debate was featured in The New Yorker, Politico, and CNN, among other media outlets, to help improve the Presidential debates. During the 2020 election, they presented three virtual debates on Bloomberg Television, which were referenced as examples of how Presidential debates could still be produced during a global pandemic.

== Project Debater AI and That's Debatable program ==
In 2019, Open to Debate served as the host of the first debate in history between an artificial intelligence and a human debater. The debate took place between IBM's Project Debater, an artificial intelligence project designed to debate humans, and Harish Natarajan, who holds the world record in number of debate competition victories. The motion was "We should subsidize preschools." It has since been featured in a documentary produced by IBM and in Adam Grant's book, Think Again.

"That's Debatable" followed two years later as a television series presented by Bloomberg Media and Open to Debate

For each episode of "That's Debatable," IBM Watson used a new advance in natural language processing (NLP) from IBM Research to provide insight into three distinct debate topics. More than 5,000 arguments were submitted online from around the world across the three topics, which were then analyzed and distilled into key points that were highlighted on the show and discussed by human debaters.

== Partnerships ==
Open to Debate has partnered with various institutions in the private sector, public sector, and academia, including the Mayo Clinic, the Brussels Forum, Northwestern University Pritzker School of Law, Techonomy, the Philanthropy Roundtable, Stanford University's Hoover Institution, The Richmond Forum, and many more.

Open to Debate has brought more than 800 prominent public figures to the program, garnering thousands of headlines in the press. Past guests and their corresponding debates include:

Dan Abrams, Ayaan Hirsi Ali, Stewart Baker, Peter Beinart, Jared Bernstein, Max Boot, Jamelle Bouie, Stewart Brand, Ian Bremmer, David Brooks, Meredith Broussard, Gloria Browne-Marshall, Nicholas Burns, David Carr, Julian Castro, Ze'ev Chafets, Liz Cheney, Michael Chertoff, Derek Chollet, Deepak Chopra, George Church, Wesley Clark, Roger Clegg, Chuck Close, Eliot A. Cohen, Jonathan Cohn, Steve Coll, Tyler Cowen, Michael Crichton, Clive Crook, Howard Dean, Alan Dershowitz, Suzanne DiMaggio, Tim Draper, Esther Dyson, Elizabeth Economy, Zeke Emanuel, Noah Feldman, Niall Ferguson, Helen Fisher, Jeff Flake, Michele Flournoy, Franklin Foer, David French, David Frum, Jason Furman, Peter Galbraith, Robert P. George, Nick Gillespie, Malcolm Gladwell, Victor Davis Hanson, Melissa Harris-Perry, Michael Hayden, Christopher Hitchens, John Hockenberry, Matthew Hoh, Margaret Hoover, Arianna Huffington, Jeff Jarvis, Karine Jean-Pierre, Simon Johnson, Van Jones, Andrew Keen, Zeba Khan, Parag Khanna, Kris Kobach, Bernard Kouchner, William Kristol, Paul Krugman, Arthur Laffer, Lawrence Lessig, Bernard-Henri Lévy, Bjørn Lomborg, Rich Lowry, John Mackey, Katherine Mangu-Ward, HR McMaster, Roger McNamee, John H McWhorter, John J. Mearsheimer, Yascha Mounk, Dambisa Moyo, Lawrence O'Donnell, P. J. O'Rourke, David Petraeus, Steven Rattner, Kenneth Rogoff, Jeffrey Rosen, Nouriel Roubini, Karl Rove, Jennifer Rubin, Jerry Saltz, David Sanger, Marietje Schaake, Kori Schake, Orville Schell, Peter Schiff, Bobby Shriver, Kristen Silverberg, Eliot Spitzer, Bret Stephens, Harry Stern, Andrew Stern, John Stossel, Nadine Strossen, Gillian Tett, Peter Thiel, Laura Tyson, Katrina vanden Heuvel, Randi Weingarten, Jacob Weisberg, Einat Wilf, Richard Wolff, David Wolpe, Fareed Zakaria, Mark Zandi, Jonathan Zittrain, Manoush Zomorodi, Mort Zuckerman, and hundreds more.
