= Yana Peel =

Canadian executive

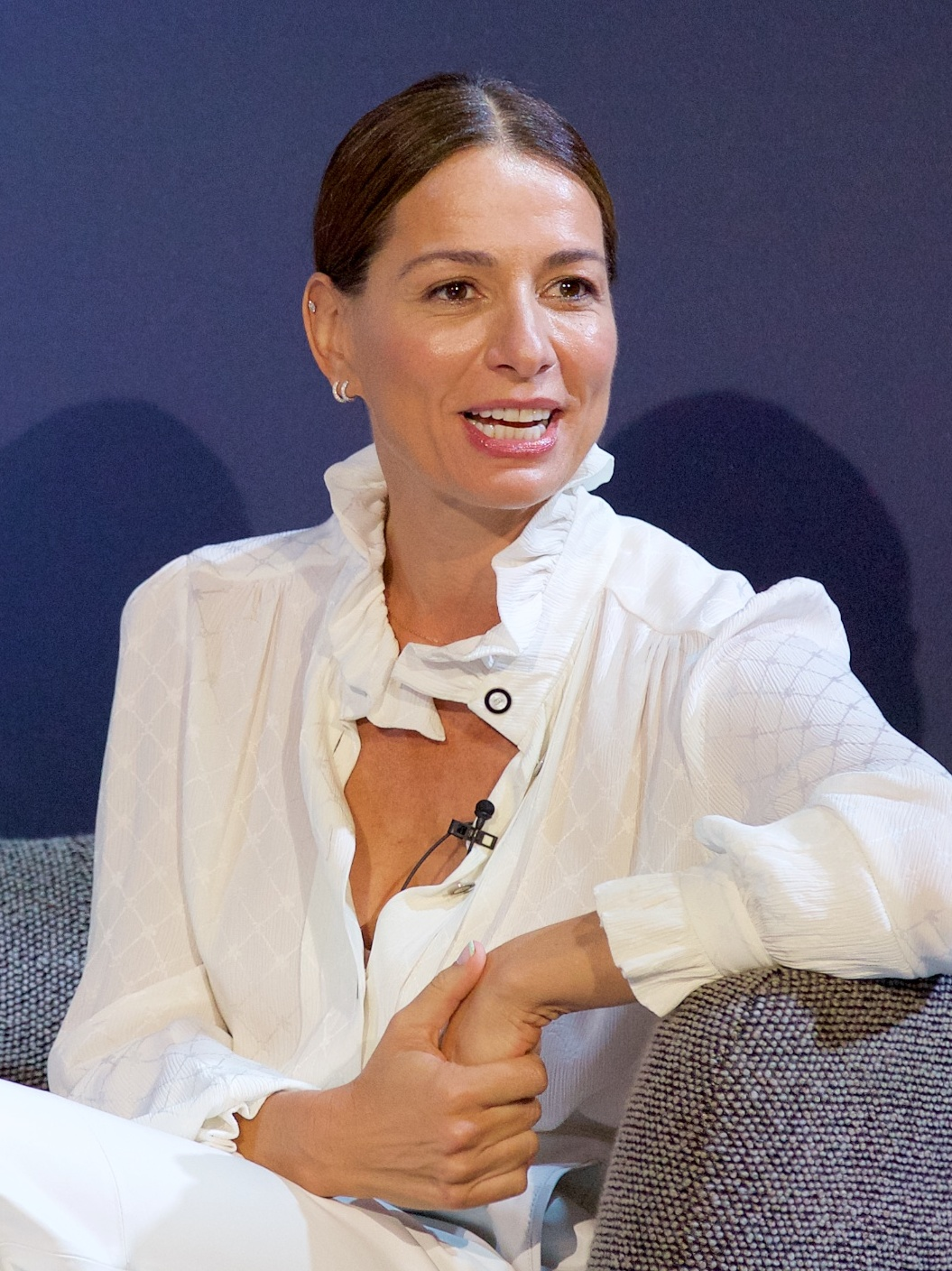
- Peel in 2021
- Born: Yana Mirkin; 1974 (age 51–52); Leningrad, USSR (now Russia)
- Education: McGill University; London School of Economics
- Occupation: Businesswoman
- Title: President of arts, culture & heritage, Chanel
- Spouse: Stephen Peel (m. 1999)
- Children: 2

Yana Peel (née Mirkin, born 1974) is a Russian-born Canadian executive, businesswoman, children's author and philanthropist, who is president of arts, culture and heritage at French fashion house Chanel. She was CEO of the Serpentine Galleries from 2016 to 2019 and previously a board member.

Peel has several advisory positions, including the Tate International Council and NSPCC therapeutic board, which is now the Children's Safety Online Taskforce. She has been an advisor to the British Fashion Council, Asia Art Archive, Lincoln Center, Para Site and the Victoria and Albert Museum, where she founded the design fund. She holds a board position at Sadler's Wells.

Peel co-founded Outset Contemporary Art Fund and Intelligence Squared Asia, and was CEO of Intelligence Squared Group from 2013 to 2016. She is part of the American Ballet Theatre Global Council and The Met International Council. Peel is a judge for the RIBA Stirling Prize 2024.

== Early life ==
She was born in Leningrad (now St. Petersburg) in 1974 and her family emigrated to Canada via Austria in 1978.

Peel grew up in Toronto, Ontario. She studied Russian studies at McGill University in the 1990s. In 1996, while a student, she co-organised a fashion show for charity. Peel undertook a post-graduate degree in economics at the London School of Economics. Peel was a member of the 2011 class of the World Economic Forum's Young Global Leaders programme.

== Career ==
=== Goldman Sachs ===
Peel started her career in the equities division of Goldman Sachs in 1997 in London and became an executive director before leaving in 2003.

=== Outset Contemporary Art Fund ===
Peel is a co-founder of the charity Outset Contemporary Art Fund, which is based in London and was launched in 2003. The charity created a model whereby artists could be presented to potential donors in order to raise funds to purchase their work, or to fund new commissions, with a view to donating them to public institutions. The Fund purchased more than 100 pieces for the Tate Modern and commissioned work by artists including Francis Alys, Yael Bartana, Candice Breitz and Steve McQueen.

=== Intelligence Squared ===
In 2009, Peel co-founded Intelligence Squared Asia with Amelie Von Wedel, a not-for-profit platform for hosting live debates in Hong Kong. In 2012 Peel became CEO of Intelligence Squared Group, bringing the live events business out of its financial difficulties. Peel has hosted interviews including: Olafur Eliasson and Shirin Neshat at Davos, Ai Wei Wei at the Cambridge Union.

=== Serpentine Galleries ===
In April 2016, Peel was appointed to the role of CEO of the Serpentine Galleries. Peel said it was her "mission to create a safe space for unsafe ideas", and to promote a "socially conscious Serpentine". She indicated that she wanted to give artists a greater say in the development of the Serpentine Galleries, in order to give "artists a voice in the biggest global conversations". Peel worked in tandem with the artistic director, Hans Ulrich Obrist.

Peel furthered the Serpentine Galleries' technological ambitions by introducing digital engagement initiatives including Serpentine Mobile Tours and the translation of the exhibition Zaha Hadid: Early Paintings and Drawings into virtual reality. Peel stated that she was "committed to maintaining and open-source spirit" at the Serpentine Galleries, and that it was her ambition "to inspire the widest audiences with the urgency of art and architecture". The Financial Times noted that Peel "has been able to lure companies such as Google and Bloomberg as partners to help meet the Serpentine's annual £9.5m target".

Peel and Obrist selected both the first African architect to work on a pavilion, and the youngest architect to do so. In 2018, she broadened the global reach of the Serpentine Pavilion programme by announcing the launch of a pavilion in Beijing designed by Sichuan practice, Jiakun Architects.

Together with Lord Richard Rogers and Sir David Adjaye, Peel and Obrist selected Burkina Faso architect Diébédo Francis Kéré to design the 2017 pavilion. The pavilion was awarded the Civic Trust Award in 2018.

The Serpentine selected Mexican architect Frida Escobedo to design the 2018 pavilion. She will be the youngest architect to have participated in the Pavilion programme since it began in 2000.

Peel stepped down as CEO in June 2019 as a consequence of the attention paid to her alleged co-ownership of NSO Group, which is a subsidiary of the Q Cyber Technologies group of companies. However, a later clarification published by The Guardian confirmed that Peel was not involved in the management, operations or control of NSO. Peel had a less than 10% ownership of Novalpina Capital, which subsequently acquired NSO in 2019. Peel was not personally involved in the operation or decisions of Novalpina Capital, which was managed by her husband.

=== Chanel ===
In March 2020, Peel joined Chanel as the new global head of arts and culture and a board member of Fondation Chanel. Peel leads Chanel's initiatives across arts and culture globally and has played a key role in advancing its association with the arts.

Peel launched Chanel Connects and the Chanel Culture Fund, which partners with cultural institutions in countries around the world to help champion new ideas and foster creativity. Peel is considered one of the art world's power brokers and forges notable partnerships, while remaining committed to democratising art appreciation.

Peel is responsible for Chanel's art partners programmes. She has established global initiatives with leading cultural institutions such as the Pompidou, National Portrait Gallery, Leeum Museum of Art in Seoul, Rijksmuseum, Power Station of Art, Australian Ballet, Museum of Contemporary Art Chicago and others. She is also responsible for collaborations with cultural leaders, including Maria Balshaw, Tristram Hunt at the Victoria and Albert Museum, Nicholas Cullinan at the NPG and National Theatre director Rufus Norris.

== Philanthropy ==
Peel co-chaired Para Site, a not-for-profit contemporary art space in Hong Kong, from 2010 to 2015. She has been involved with the project since 2009.

Peel founded the Victoria and Albert Museum's design fund in 2011. The fund supported the acquisition of contemporary design objects.

Peel is a member of NSPCC's therapeutic board. Inspired by her children, in 2008 Peel produced a series of toddler-friendly art books published by Templar, including: Art For Baby, Color For Baby and Faces For Baby. The books feature works by artists ranging from Damien Hirst to Keith Haring. Proceeds from sales go towards the NSPCC.

== Personal life ==
In 1999, Peel married Stephen Peel, a private equity financier. They have two children and live in Bayswater, London.

== Awards and honours ==
- Montblanc Award for Arts Patronage 2011
- Debrett's 500 List: Art
- Evening Standard Progress 1000 2017
- ArtLyst Power 100
- Harper's Bazaar Women of the Year 2017
- Harper's Bazaar Working Wardrobe: Best dressed women 2018
- Henry Crown Fellow. Appointed by the Aspen Institute in 2018.
- Number Two in Tatler's best dressed list 2023
- WWD Women in Power list 2025
