= Robert Rosenkranz =

American insurance and investment manager, philanthropist (b. 1942)

- Born: August 5, 1942 (age 84)
- Education: Yale University (BA); Harvard University (LLB)
- Occupations: Philanthropist, Delphi Financial Group CEO
- Children: 2, including Nicholas Quinn Rosenkranz
- Website: robertrosenkranz.com

Robert Rosenkranz (born August 5, 1942) is an American philanthropist and the chairman of Delphi Capital Management, an investment concern with over $40 billion in assets under management, and the founder of a group of investment and private equity partnerships. From 1987 until 2018 he was the chief executive officer (CEO) of Delphi Financial Group, an insurance company with more than $1.5 billion in operating income. Delphi grew from one of his acquisitions and increased its value 100-fold under his leadership.

A graduate of Yale (summa cum laude) with a BA in economics, and Harvard Law School, he spent his early career as an economist with the RAND Corporation, where he was engaged in research on foreign policy issues and municipal finance.

== Philanthropy ==
In 1985, Rosenkranz founded the Rosenkranz Foundation with the mission of encouraging fresh perspectives and innovation in public policy, higher education and the arts. One initiative of the foundation is Open to Debate, formerly known as Intelligence Squared U.S. Debates (established in New York City in 2006), a public policy debate series that provides a forum for reasoned public discourse through live events, a podcast, a weekly public radio program carried by hundreds of National Public Radio stations, and televised on Bloomberg TV. He serves on the board of directors for the Manhattan Institute, the Whitney Museum of American Art in New York as Vice President, the Hoover Institution at Stanford University in California, the Serpentine Galleries, and the Buck Institute for Research on Aging. He is also a member of the Council on Foreign Relations and served on several councils at the Metropolitan Museum of Art.

In late 2009, Yale University dedicated its new building, Rosenkranz Hall, in recognition of Rosenkranz's philanthropic work. Rosenkranz Hall is home to Yale's social sciences and international studies departments.

In April 2010, Rosenkranz was honored by the Manhattan Institute with their annual Alexander Hamilton Award, which he received in recognition of his founding of the Intelligence Squared U.S. debate series.

The Rosenkranz Foundation also endowed Yale's Rosenkranz Writer-in-Residence program, funded several exhibitions at the Guggenheim Museum and promoted Chinese art by sponsoring a major exhibit on Mu Xin donating a large collection to Harvard University, and funded a book series on modern Chinese art by Yale University Press.

The Rosenkranz Foundation’s health span initiative funds basic scientific research to understand why cells age and to find interventions to slow or reverse the aging process. In May 2025, Stanford University named The Robert Rosenkranz Science and Engineering Quad to honor Rosenkranz’s generous gifts that support aging research and endow professorships in the STEM fields. The gift resulting from Rosenkranz’s commitment is expected to be among the largest individual bequests or gifts ever received by the university. He is also creating a new cultural institution in New York, called Canyon, to showcase artists working at the intersection of video, sound and music, and technology.

Rosenkranz was featured on Time Magazine’s Time100 Philanthropy 2025 list.

== Open to Debate Foundation and public policy ==
Rosenkranz founded Intelligence Squared U.S.(IQ2US) in 2006, together with Dana Wolfe, previously of Ted Koppel's Nightline, as a live debate series with the goal of raising the level of public discourse and promoting a realization that, on contentious issues, those who challenge the conventional wisdom have intellectually respectable and often persuasive viewpoints. It changed its name to Open to Debate in April 2023. Through an annual series of weekly debates, staged in the Oxford-style and other formats, Open to Debate brings together thought-leaders and audiences together around public policy and cultural issues. The program has been the subject of articles in The New York Times, The New Yorker, and many other publications. Forbes Magazine highlighted it as "one of five podcasts that will change the way you think."

Moderated by ABC's John Donvan, panelists have included Arianna Huffington, P. J. O'Rourke, Karl Rove, David Brooks, Mort Zuckerman, Wesley Clark, Bernard-Henri Lévy and many others.

Rosenkranz writes about public policy and finance for the Huffington Post, and The Wall Street Journal. He is also an investment contributor to Forbes.

== Selected publications ==
In May 2025, Rosenkranz published a book, The Stoic Capitalist, discussing how he applied the principles of Stoicism to his business career. Part memoir, part philosophy, and part practical guide, the book is a personal reflection on how Stoic philosophy shaped his thinking in business, investing, and life.

== Personal life ==
Rosenkranz lives in Aspen. He has two children from a marriage to Margret Hill (June 20, 1940 - September 27, 2018) which ended in divorce: Nicholas Quinn Rosenkranz and Stephanie Rosenkranz Hessler, both constitutional law scholars. Since June 29, 2002. he has been married to Alexandra Munroe, a renowned curator and scholar. He is Jewish, but his second marriage was officiated at a Presbyterian church.
