= Alexandra Munroe =

American curator of Asian art

Alexandra Munroe is an American curator and author known for her expertise in postwar and contemporary Asian art. She is presently Senior Curator at Large, Global Arts, for the Solomon R. Guggenheim Museum, where she has led the museum’s Asian Art Initiative since its founding in 2006. From 2017 to 2023, she served as director of curatorial affairs for the Guggenheim Abu Dhabi Project, supervising teams in New York and Abu Dhabi. From 1998 to 2005, Monroe served as director of the museum at the Japan Society of New York.

Monroe has organized more than 40 art exhibitions in her career as a curator. While still a graduate student in art history, Monroe organized "Yayoi Kusama: A Retrospective" (1989) at the Center for International Contemporary Arts in New York. Her 1994 exhibition "Japanese Art after 1945: Scream Against the Sky" is credited with establishing the field of postwar Japanese art history in North America. Munroe went on to curate the first major American retrospectives of Daido Moriyama (1999), Yoko Ono (2000), Mu Xin (2001), Cai Guo-Qiang (2008), and Lee Ufan (2011). In 2017, she was lead curator of the Guggenheim's "Art and China after 1989: Theater of the World", and in 2024 she curated "Yu Hong: Another One Bites the Dust" alongside the 60th Venice Biennale.

== Early life and education ==
Munroe was born in New York City on May 21, 1957. Her father was a manager in a pharmaceutical firm and her mother was a painter. At the age of 13, her family moved to Ashiya City, Japan for her father's work. She studied at Brown University and Doshisha University before receiving a bachelor of arts in Japanese Language and Culture from Sophia University in Tokyo in 1982. In 2004, she completed a Ph.D. in art history at New York University. She studied under Harry Harootunian and wrote her thesis on postwar Japanese art and politics.

During her college years in Japan, Munroe spent time as a resident lay disciple at Daitoku-ji, a Zen Buddhist temple in Kyoto.

== Curatorial career ==
In 1982, Munroe was hired as a curator by the Japan Society of New York. Her first job was to organize an exhibition of works by Ushio Shinohara, a Japanese avant-garde artist then living in New York. Monroe remained at the Japan Society museum for seven years before branching out as an independent curator-at-large. In 1989, she curated "Yayoi Kusama: A Retrospective," for the Center for International Contemporary Arts (CICA), New York, and her survey exhibition Japanese Art After 1945: Scream Against the Sky (1994–95) initiated the academic field of postwar Japanese art history in the United States.

Later exhibitions included YES Yoko Ono (Japan Society Gallery, New York, 2000); Cai Guo Qiang: I Want to Believe (Solomon R. Guggenheim Museum, 2008); and Lee Ufan: Marking Infinity (Solomon R. Guggenheim Museum, 2011).The Third Mind: American Artists Contemplate Asia, 1860–1989 (Solomon R. Guggenheim Museum, 2009) was among the largest exhibitions of Asian influence on American culture to date and received the inaugural Chairman's Special Award of $1,000,000 from the National Endowment for the Humanities. In 2017, Munroe was the lead curator of the Guggenheim exhibition, Art and China after 1989: Theater of the World, and in 2024, Munroe curated "Yu Hong: Another One Bites the Dust", an off-site program of the Guggenheim's Asian Art Initiative presented concurrently with the 60th Venice Biennale at the Chiesetta della Misericordia.

In 1998, Munroe returned to the Japan Society of New York's museum, serving as museum director until 2005. In 2006, she accepted a position as Senior Curator of Asian Art at the Solomon R. Guggenheim Museum, spearheading the museum's newly established Asian Art Initiative.

In 2007, Munroe has organized the first meeting of the Guggenheim's Asian Art Council, an advisory group of global art curators. The Council has continued to meet biannually in different cities around the world, under Monroe's guidance.

Under Munroe's direction, the Guggenheim launched The Robert H. N. Ho Family Foundation Chinese Art Initiative in 2013 with a $10 million grant to study, present, and acquire contemporary art from China. From 2017 to 2023, Munroe served as director of curatorial affairs for the Guggenheim Abu Dhabi Project, supervising teams in New York and Abu Dhabi.

== Awards and honors ==
Munroe's exhibitions and publications have been recognized by numerous awards. The International Association of Art Critics (AICA-USA) has cited four of her exhibitions: YES YOKO ONO (First Prize, Best Museum Show Originating in New York, 2001), Little Boy: The Arts of Japan’s Exploding Subculture, shared with Takashi Murakami (First Prize, Best Thematic Museum Show in New York, 2006), Third Mind: American Artists Contemplate Asia, 1860–1989 (First Prize, Best Thematic Museum Show in New York, 2010), and Gutai: Splendid Playground (shared with Ming Tiampo, First Prize, Best Thematic Museum Show in New York, 2014).

In 2012, the American Alliance of Museums conferred an Honorable Mention in the Publications Competition on Lee Ufan: Marking Infinity. Likewise, in 2009, the Association of American Museum Curators awarded The Third Mind: American Artists Contemporary Asia, 1860–1989 an Honorable Mention for Outstanding Exhibition Catalogue.

In 2009, the catalogue for Cai Guo-Qiang: I Want to Believe took First Place for 30th George Wittenborn Memorial Book Award, presented by the Art Libraries Society of North America, and in 2008–09, China Art Powers named the exhibition the Best Show in China. In 1996, the catalogue Japanese Art after 1945: Scream Against the Sky was a finalist for the Alfred H. Barr Jr. Award for Outstanding Scholarship in a Publication, awarded by the College Art Association.

In 2024, Munroe received the Japan Society Award, given annually for lifetime achievement in the service of the US-Japan relationship.

== Civic and institutional involvement ==
In response to the COVID-19 pandemic, Munroe worked with Chinese artist Ai Weiwei as curator of Ai Weiwei MASK. Launched in May 2020, this project offered face coverings hand-printed with iconic images of the artist’s lifelong campaign for free speech and individual rights. Ai donated the artworks to be sold exclusively through eBay for Charity to benefit the COVID-19 emergency humanitarian efforts led by non-governmental organizations.

Munroe is Chair of the Board of Trustees of the Aspen Music Festival and School, and a trustee of the American Academy in Rome and Open to Debate (formerly Intelligence Squared US). She is a member of the Council on Foreign Relations. She serves on the advisory boards of several organizations, including Asia Art Archive, Hong Kong; Jnanapravaha Mumbai; MAXXI, National Museum of 21st Century Art, Rome; and Rockbund Art Museum, Shanghai.

== Personal life ==
Munroe is married to financier Robert Rosenkranz. The couple divides their time between New York City, Aspen, and London.

== Publications ==
- Alexandra Munroe, ed. (2024). Yu Hong: Another One Bites the Dust. New York: DelMonico Books. ISBN 978-1-63681-151-2.
- Alexandra Munroe with Philip Tinari and Hou Hanru (2017). Art and China after 1989: Theater of the World. New York: Guggenheim Museum. ISBN 978-0-89207-528-7.
- Alexandra Munroe and Ming Tiampo (2013). Gutai: Splendid Playground. New York: Guggenheim Museum. ISBN 978-0-89207-489-1.
- Alexandra Munroe (2011). Lee Ufan: Marking Infinity. New York: Guggenheim Museum. ISBN 978-0-89207-418-1.
- Alexandra Munroe (2009). The Third Mind: American Artists Contemplate Asia, 1860–1989. New York: Guggenheim Museum. ISBN 978-0-89207-383-2.
- Thomas Krens and Alexandra Munroe (2008). Cai Guo-Qiang: I Want to Believe. New York: Guggenheim Museum. ISBN 978-0892073719.
- Takashi Murakami (2005). Little Boy: The Arts of Japan's Exploding Subcultures. New Haven and London: Yale University Press. ISBN 0-300-10285-2.
- Alexandra Munroe; Wu Hung (2001). The Art of Mu Xin: Landscape Paintings and Prison Notes. New York: Guggenheim Museum. ISBN 0-300-09075-7.
- Alexandra Munroe with Jon Hendricks (2000). YES YOKO ONO. New York: Harry N. Abrams. ISBN 0-8109-4587-8.
- Daido Moriyama, Alexandra Munroe and Sandra S. Phillip (1999). Daido Moriyama: Stray Dog. San Francisco: San Francisco Museum of Modern Art. ISBN 0-918471-50-8.
- Alexandra Munroe (1994). Japanese Art After 1945: Scream Against the Sky. New York: Harry N. Abrams. ISBN 0-8109-2593-1.
- Alexandra Munroe Munroe and Tadayasu Sakai (1993). Alternative Visions: Liu Dan and Hiromitsu Morimoto. New York and Tokyo: Takashimaya Co., Ltd.
- Alexandra Munroe and Bhupendra Karia (1989). Yayoi Kusama: A Retrospective. New York. ISBN 0-9623764-0-X.
