= Kerstin Mogull =

Swedish businesswoman

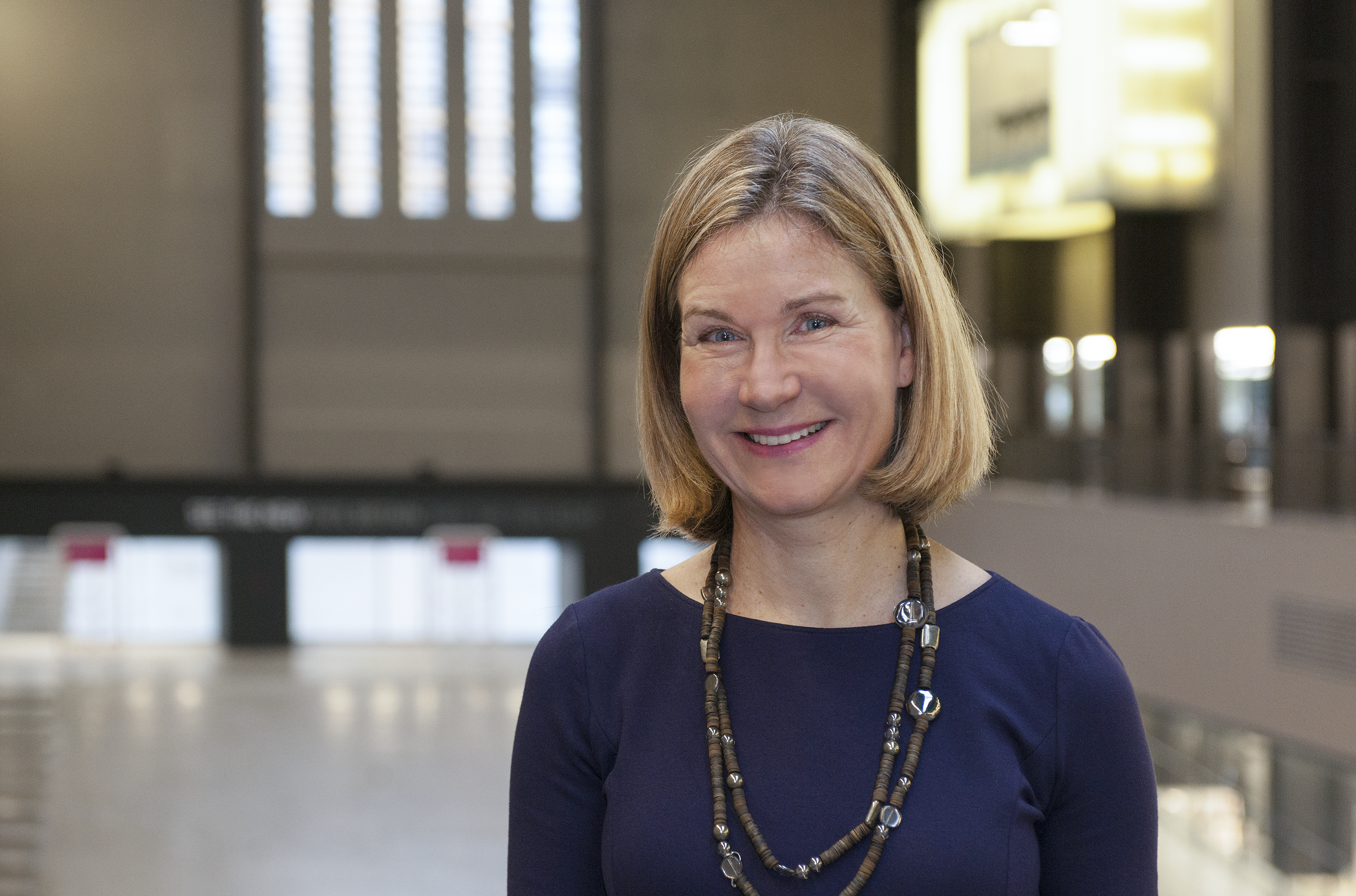
- Kerstin Mogull in the Tate Modern Turbine Hall
- Education: Stockholm School of Economics, HEC, Paris Business School
- Alma mater: Kellogg School of Management, (Chicago)

Kerstin Mogull is a Swedish business woman and leading figure in the digital media and cultural sectors in the UK. She was the managing director of Tate between 2014 and 2019, leading the Tate teams that delivered the Tate Modern extension (2016), and the Tate St Ives extension (2017). Earlier in her career, she held several senior executive roles at the BBC, including Head of Strategy and Chief Operating Officer of Future Media & Technology, where she was instrumental in the planning and launch of BBC iPlayer (2007)

== Career – Tate ==
During her early years at Tate, Mogull worked alongside Sir Nicolas Serota, Tate Director from 1988 to 2017. One of her key areas of focus was customer engagement, overseeing the enhancement of Tate's presence online, on social media and through membership initiatives. She directed the launch of Tate Collective in 2018, a membership scheme created for 16- to 25-year-olds. With Mogull as managing director, Tate experienced its fastest membership growth ever, hitting 150,000 members in May 2019, making it the world's largest such scheme.

== The Digital Gallery ==
Extending Tate's reach and engaging a younger audience underpinned the initiatives led by Mogull to grow Tate's digital presence on its website and on social media. Innovative digital projects built around Tate's collection and exhibitions opened up the galleries to new viewers. After Dark involved robots roaming the floors of Tate Britain at night, controlled remotely by users worldwide who could explore the art in real time. The exhibition was designed for Tate by creative digital agency The Workers and won the IK Prize, which supports innovative ways of discovering art. During the Modigliani exhibition at Tate Modern in 2018, Modigliani's studio was recreated for visitors to enjoy in virtual reality

== Tate Modern Blavatnik Building and Tate St Ives ==
Among Mogull's’ most visible achievements at Tate was the completion in 2016 of the £260-million Tate Modern extension, the Blavatnik Building. The extension, designed by Herzog & de Meuron, won the Royal Institute of British Architects (RIBA) London Award as well as its National Award in 2017. Its opening led to a significant increase in visitor numbers, and in 2018 Tate Modern overtook the British Museum as Britain's most popular tourist attraction.

Mogull oversaw an extension and refurbishment of Tate St Ives, which doubled the gallery's exhibition space. The re-opened gallery won the Art Fund Museum of the Year in 2018.

== International Partnerships ==
Recognising the importance of tourism and global engagement to Tate's ongoing success, Mogull was instrumental in expanding Tate's international partnerships. In 2015 she accompanied Chancellor of the Exchequer George Osborne on a trade and cultural mission to China. The mission resulted in the touring to China of Tate's best-ever attended exhibition anywhere in the world – Landscapes of the Mind: Masterpieces from Tate Britain (1700–1980), which was held at the Shanghai Museum in 2018, and attracted 615,000 visitors in just 14 weeks.

Separately, she led the 2019 signing by Tate of a development partnership agreement with Shanghai's Pudong Museum of Art (PMoA), designed by Jean Nouvel Architects and currently under construction.

== The BBC and iPlayer ==
Mogull spent 12 years at the BBC (2000–2012), in a variety of executive roles, including Head of Production Strategy and Head of Strategy. She was instrumental in the 2007 launch of BBC iPlayer, which led to her appointment in 2008 as Chief Operating Officer of BBC Future Media & Technology (FM&T). In this position Mogull was responsible for the further development of iPlayer and directing the BBC's online initiatives. By establishing global partnerships with leading technology companies, Mogull helped secure a BBC presence on 40 million consumer devices. She also oversaw the launch of the BBC News app, which saw one million downloads in its first month. Whilst at the BBC, Kerstin was recognised as one of the ten most influential women in UK technology.

When Mogull left the BBC, she spent a year as Director of Strategy and Business Growth at Clear Channel International, before joining Tate in 2014.

== Education and early career ==
Having been jointly awarded a degree in economics by the Stockholm School of Economics and HEC Paris, Mogull went on to gain an MBA at the Kellogg School of Management in Chicago as a Fulbright Scholar.

Mogull began her career in her native Sweden in the IT industry with Ericsson. She then worked for American Airlines and United Airlines, taking on senior strategy posts – primarily in the emerging computer reservations systems (CRS) industry – in the United States and latterly the UK.

== Board Positions ==
Mogull was a non-executive director of Bonnier AB between 2015 and 2019 and remains a non-executive director of ColArt Holdings Ltd (Lindéngruppen). She is also a Council Member for the Swedish Chamber of Commerce in London. She was a board member of the Brain Research Trust between 2011 and 2014.

== Sport – Triathlon ==
Kerstin has represented Great Britain as an Age-Group Triathlete since 2017, winning multiple medals at European and World Championships.
