= Frankfurt art theft =

Art crime

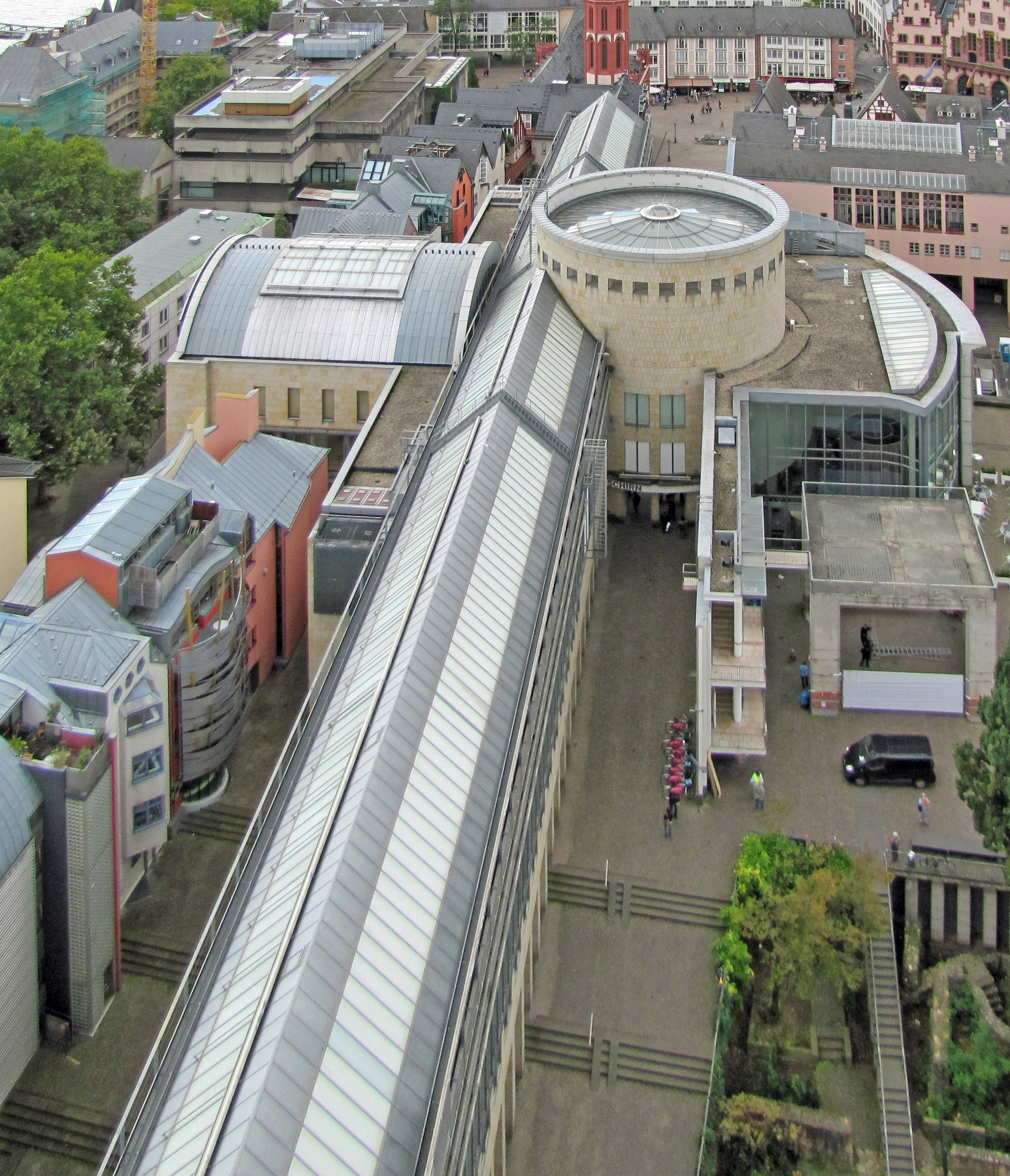
Kunsthalle Schirn in Frankfurt

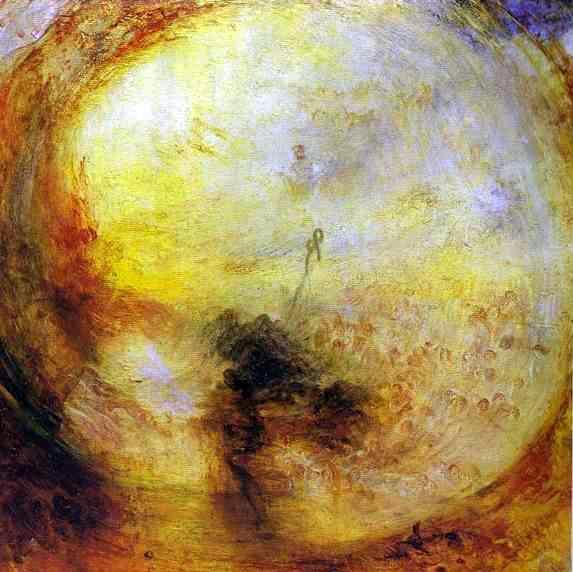
Light and Colour (Goethe's Theory) by J. M. W. Turner, 1843

Shade and Darkness by J. M. W. Turner, 1843

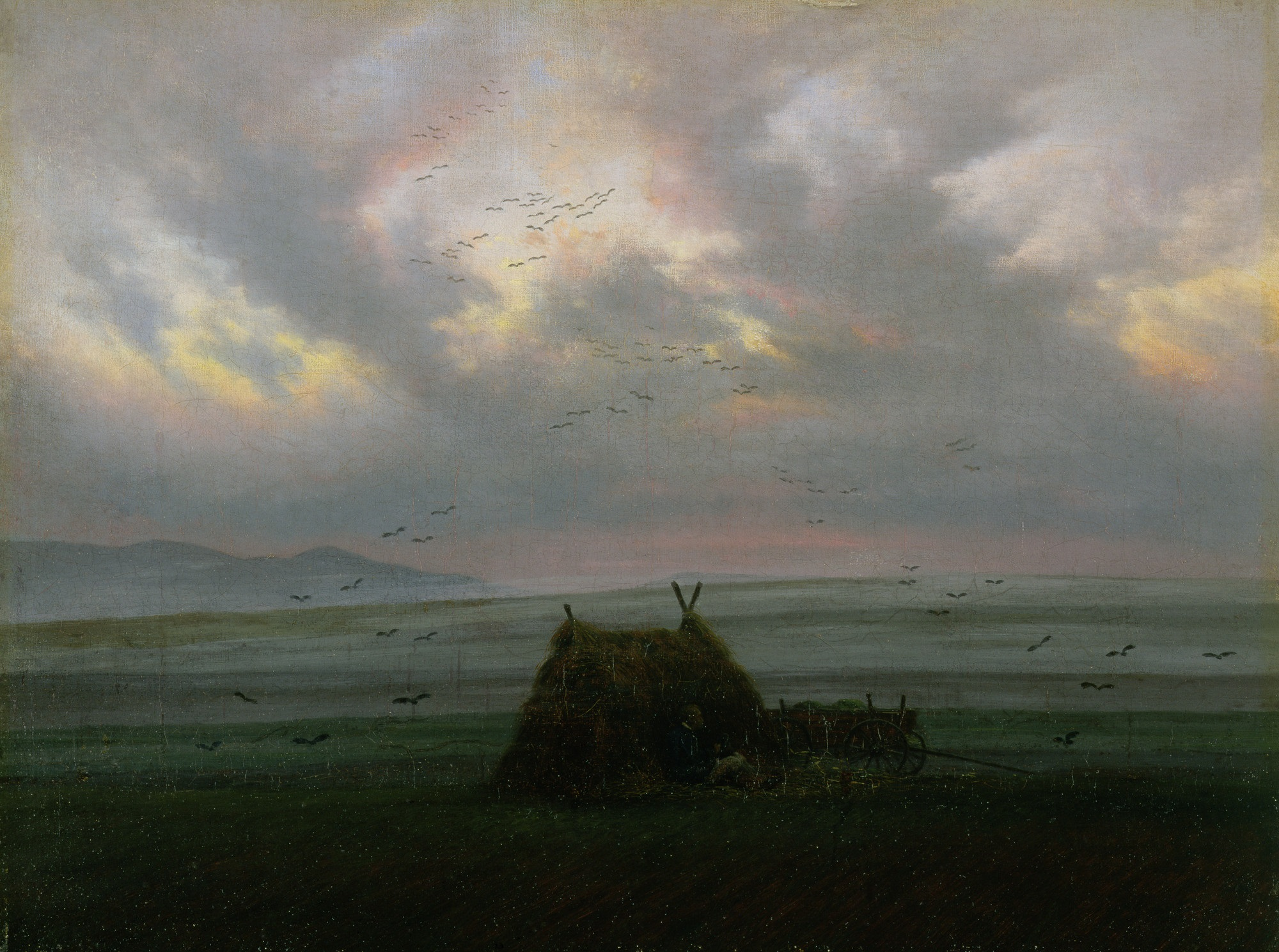
Nebelschwaden by Caspar David Friedrich, c. 1820

Three famous paintings were stolen from the Kunsthalle Schirn in Frankfurt in 1994. Two thieves and a dealer were caught and sentenced to prison, but the people who had ordered the theft were never brought to justice. This case of art theft is unique in that the paintings were recovered by buying them back from the people behind the theft, resulting in a heavy profit for the Tate Gallery, owner of two of the paintings.

== Theft and failed prosecution of "Stevo" ==
The theft took place on 28 July 1994 in the Kunsthalle Schirn in Frankfurt. The thieves had themselves locked into the museum at night and then overpowered a security guard. The stolen paintings were Light and Colour (Goethe's Theory) – The Morning after the Deluge – Moses Writing the Book of Genesis and Shade and Darkness, a sequence by J. M. W. Turner and on loan from the Tate Gallery in London, and Nebelschwaden by Caspar David Friedrich, on loan from the Kunsthalle Hamburg. Two of the thieves and a dealer were apprehended quickly, but they refused to reveal the location of the paintings and the identity of the people who had ordered the theft. In 1999 they received sentences of up to 11 years in prison. They were represented by attorney Edgar Liebrucks who had defended several Mafia figures before. Police were unable to recover the paintings. Insurance companies paid about 40 million euros to the paintings' owners.

The central suspect, a major figure of the Yugoslavian Mafia in Frankfurt known as "Stevo", tried to sell the paintings to an underworld figure of Marbella. The two could not agree on a price, and undercover agents from the German police then joined the negotiations in 1995. A new deal for purchase of the paintings was set up, but it broke down in the last minute when Stevo's negotiator demanded a doubling of the advance payment. Stevo was arrested, but the evidence was deemed insufficient for prosecution. He was represented by Edgar Liebrucks. The German prosecutors then all but gave up on the case.

== Operation Cobalt ==
Tate had received 24 million pounds from various insurers at Lloyd's of London including Hiscox and other London based underwriters as a settlement for the claim of theft, with the option to repurchase the works should they ever be recovered. According to the terms of the Turner Bequest, Tate was not allowed to sell the works and therefore was not able to use the insurance money for other purposes.

In 1998, the Tate Gallery paid 8 million pounds back to various insurers to ensure that Tate retained title of ownership in the paintings should they ever resurface.

The director of Tate, Sir Nicholas Serota, after having received green light from his supervisory board and justice officials, then started a secret plan to buy back the paintings, known as "Operation Cobalt". An undercover agent from Scotland Yard contacted Edgar Liebrucks, and in late 1999 the lawyer began to negotiate with the Mafia on behalf of Tate. The two sides agreed on a purchase price of 5 million Deutsche Marks per painting. Stevo again increased the demanded advance payment from 1 to 2 million Marks, and Liebrucks took out a personal loan to cover this payment. The deal for the first painting went through, Liebrucks received about 750,000 Marks as compensation by Tate, and Shade and Darkness returned to London in July 2000. Liebrucks refused as "indecent" an offer of 1 million Marks for information about the people behind the theft. Further negotiations then halted; Stevo apparently had lost interest.

In autumn 2002 two men contacted Liebrucks; they indicated that they had possession of the two remaining paintings and were willing to sell. Apparently, Stevo had stored the paintings with them, and possibly they were now acting on their own behalf, trying to hoodwink Stevo. The Tate Gallery then bought the remaining Turner painting for 2 million euros; it returned to London around Christmas 2002. The two men took a six-month holiday in Cuba.

Considering that the Tate Gallery received more from the insurers than it paid to the thieves, it profited substantially. Responding to a BBC documentary on the case, officials of the Tate Gallery insisted that all payments were cleared ahead of times with German and British authorities, and the millions were not paid to criminals as ransom, but for "information that led to the recovery of the paintings". Sandy Nairne, then programme director at the Tate, negotiated secretly for 8 years on behalf of the Tate to recover the two paintings. His experience is chronicled in his 2011 book, Art Theft and the Case of the Stolen Turners.

== Recovery of Friedrich painting ==
In 2003, Liebrucks contacted the Kunsthalle Hamburg and offered his services. The Kunsthalle Hamburg authorized Liebrucks to recover the Friedrich painting. When the two men returned from their Cuba vacation, Liebrucks was able to lower the price from an initial 1.5 million euros to 250,000 euros. Confident that he would be compensated later, the lawyer paid with his own money and returned the painting in August 2003 to the Kunsthalle. The two men left for Brazil.

The Kunsthalle had received 1.9 million euros from its insurer to compensate for the theft; this money had to be returned upon recovery of the painting. The Kunsthalle refused to recompensate Liebrucks, charging that he had possibly acted in collusion with the thieves. Liebrucks, pointing to a written contract with the Kunsthalle, sued in 2005 and prevailed in June 2006, receiving the 250,000 euros plus a fee of 20,000 euros.

== Video ==
- Breitwieser, Stéphane; Gräfenstein, Andreas; Herzogenrath, Wulf; Nairne, Sandy; Rois, Sophie (2015), Die Kunst ist weg (in German), [Mainz]: ZDF [u.a.], OCLC 935713548
