= Jeremy O'Grady =

British media entrepreneur

- Education: Trinity College, Cambridge; Cornell University
- Occupations: Media entrepreneur, magazine editor

Jeremy O'Grady is a British media entrepreneur educated at Trinity College, Cambridge and Cornell University. A former senior examiner at the British Board of Film Classification, he was the founding editor of The Week news digest magazine, and one of its original owners. He is now the magazine's editor-in-chief. In 2002 he set up the London debating forum Intelligence Squared with media entrepreneur John Gordon.
