= Nicholas Quinn Rosenkranz =

American legal scholar

- Born: November 28, 1970 (age 55); New York City, U.S.
- Relatives: Robert Rosenkranz (father)

Academic background
- Education: Yale University (BA, JD)

Academic work
- Discipline: Jurisprudence
- Institutions: Georgetown Law; Cato Institute
- Notable works: The Subjects of the Constitution
- Website: Georgetown biography

Nicholas Quinn Rosenkranz (born November 28, 1970) is an American legal scholar. He writes and teaches in the fields of constitutional law, statutory interpretation, and federal jurisdiction. He is the son of billionaire investor and philanthropist Robert Rosenkranz.

Rosenkranz clerked for Justice Anthony Kennedy and served as an attorney-advisor in the Office of Legal Counsel. He regularly contributes legal commentary for news media, including Fox News, PBS, C-SPAN, and other media organizations. His work has been cited by Supreme Court Justices Samuel Alito and Clarence Thomas.

== Early life ==
Rosenkranz is the son of billionaire investor Robert Rosenkranz and Margaret "Peggy" Hill. His father is Jewish. His sister, Stephanie Rosenkranz Hessler, is also a legal scholar and a fellow at the Manhattan Institute.

Rosenkranz is a graduate of Phillips Academy, Yale University (Bachelor of Arts, English, 1992), and Yale Law School (Juris Doctor, 1999). At law school, he was also an Olin Fellow in Law and Economics.

== Federal government ==
=== Judiciary ===
After graduating law school, Rosenkranz clerked for Judge Frank H. Easterbrook of the United States Court of Appeals for the Seventh Circuit and for Associate Justice Anthony Kennedy of the Supreme Court of the United States.

Nicholas Quinn Rosenkranz was on a list the Trump White House sent to Schumer and Gillibrand in July 2017 that included three other names for the US Court of Appeals for the Second Circuit, where there were two vacancies: The other names were US District Judge Richard J. Sullivan; Matthew McGill, a partner at the law firm Gibson Dunn in Washington and Michael H. Park, a partner at the law firm Consovoy McCarthy Park in New York.

Rosenkranz has filed numerous briefs with, and presented oral arguments before, the Supreme Court. In 2013, the National Law Journal featured Rosenkranz's Supreme Court brief that argued that Missouri v. Holland was wrongly decided in Bond v. United States. Eight years prior to Bond v. United States (2013) Rosenkranz had written a similar article in the Harvard Law Review, Executing the Treaty Power, arguing that Missouri v. Holland had been wrongly decided.

=== Executive branch ===
From 2002 to 2004 Rosenkranz served as an attorney-advisor at the Office of Legal Counsel in the U.S. Department of Justice. In 2016 he served as Senior Advisor on Legal Policy and Constitutional Law for candidate Marco Rubio during Rubio's 2016 election campaign. He had previously been a member of 2008 presidential candidate John McCain's Justice Advisory Committee during the United States presidential election of 2008.

=== Congressional testimony ===
Rosenkranz has testified before the United States Congress as a legal expert, including in front of the Senate Judiciary Committee during the confirmation hearings for Sonia Sotomayor, President Obama's Supreme Court nominee, and Loretta Lynch, Obama's nominee for Attorney General. He also testified before the Oversight & Investigations Subcommittee of the House Financial Services Committee, on the constitutionality of the United States Department of Justice's bank settlement agreements after the 2008 financial crisis, and before the House Judiciary Committee on issues of a president of the United States' duty to "take Care that the Laws be faithfully executed."

== Academia ==
=== Appointments ===
Rosenkranz joined the faculty at Georgetown University Law Center in 2004. Rosenkranz is a senior fellow in constitutional studies at the Cato Institute, and a member of the board of directors of the Federalist Society. He is also a co-founder of Heterodox Academy along with Jonathan Haidt, and serves on its executive committee.

Rosenkranz has been a national fellow at the Hoover Institution and a visiting professor of law at Stanford Law School.

== Broadway producer ==
Rosenkranz has produced several Broadway productions, including David Mamet's Speed-the-Plow, David Mamet's Race, and Tom Stoppard's Arcadia. In 2011, he was nominated for a Tony Award for the Best Revival of a Play in Arcadia. His mother is Broadway producer, Peggy Hill.

== Contributions to scholarly journals ==
- Intellectual Diversity in the Legal Academy, 37 Harvard Journal of Law and Public Policy 137–143 (2014). Intellectual Diversity in the Legal Academy
- The Objects of the Constitution, 63 Stanford Law Review 1005–1069 (2011). The Objects of the Constitution
- The Subjects of the Constitution, 62 Stanford Law Review 1209–1292 (2010). The Subjects of the Constitution
- An American Amendment, 32 Harvard Journal of Law and Public Policy 475–482 (2009). An American Amendment
- Condorcet and the Constitution: A Response to the Law of Other States, 59 Stanford Law Review 1281–1308 (2007). Condorcet and the Constitution: A Response to the Law of Other States
- Executing the Treaty Power, 118 Harvard Law Review 1867–1938 (2005). Executing the Treaty Power
- Federal Rules of Statutory Interpretation, 115 Harvard Law Review. 2085–2157 (2002). Federal Rules of Statutory Interpretation

== See also ==
- List of law clerks for the first seat of the Supreme Court of the United States
