= SS Rosecrans =

Coordinates: 46°16′57.4″N 124°05′14.6″W

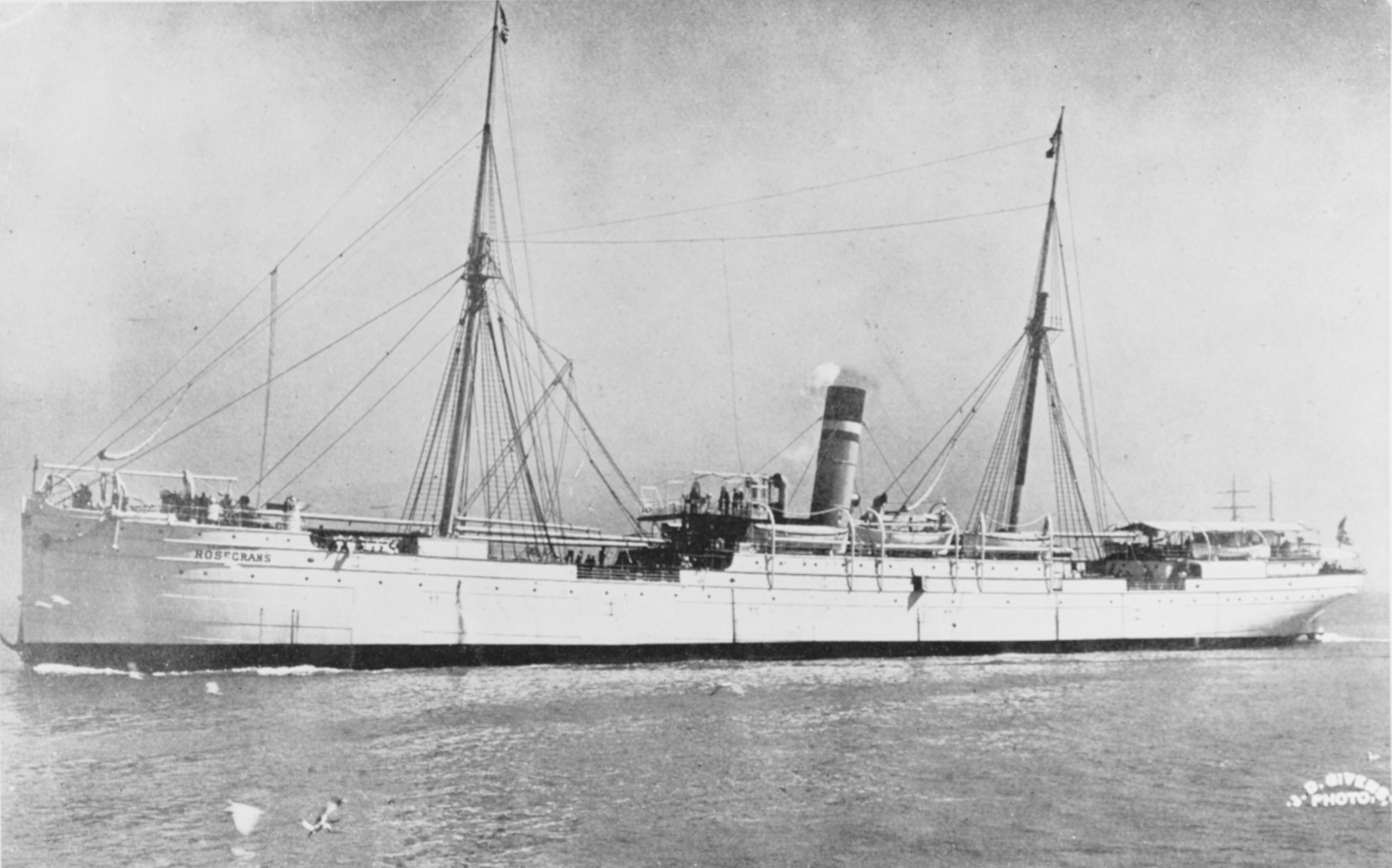

History

United Kingdom
- Name: Methven Castle (1883–1897); Columbia (1897–1900); Rosecrans (1900–1913)
- Namesake: Methven Castle; Columbia River; William Rosecrans
- Owner: Donald Currie & Co. (1883–1897); W.M. Rhodes (1897); North American Mail Steamship Co. (1897–1900); United States Army (1900–1903); Matson Navigation Co. (1902–1906); Associated Oil Company (1906–1913)
- Operator: Castle Mail Packet Co. (1883–1897); Scottish American Steamship Co. (1897); North American Mail Steamship Co. (1897–1899); United States Army (1899–1902); National Oil & Transportation Co. (1902–1906); Associated Oil Company (1906–1913)
- Builder: Barclay, Curle & Co. Glasgow
- Yard number: 318
- Launched: 19 September 1883
- Sponsored by: Miss Maggie Gilchrist
- Commissioned: 9 November 1883
- Maiden voyage: 15 December 1883
- Home port: London (1883–1897); Tacoma (1897–1902); San Francisco (1902–1913)
- Identification: UK Official Number 87198; Call sign JBSM; US Official Number 127310; Call sign KNTC
- Fate: Wrecked, 7 January 1913

General characteristics
- Type: Passenger Cargo Ship (1883-1903); Tanker (1903-1913)
- Tonnage: 2,681 GRT (1883-1898); 2,976 GRT (1898–1913); 1,740 NRT (1883–1898); 1,816 NRT (1898–1913)
- Length: 335.0 ft (102.11 m)
- Beam: 38.2 ft (11.64 m)
- Depth: 27.2 ft (8.29 m)
- Installed power: 246 Nhp, 1,320 ihp
- Propulsion: Barclay, Curle & Co. two-cylinder inverted compound engine
- Speed: 12 knots (14 mph; 22 km/h)

Methven Castle was a steam iron passenger cargo ship built in 1882–1883 by Barclay, Curle & Company of Glasgow for Donald Currie & Co. with intention of serving as cargo, passenger and mail carrier on their existing route from England to South Africa. The vessel was later sold to the North American Mail Steamship Co. of Tacoma to work on their Oriental trade routes and renamed Columbia. In 1899 the ship was chartered by the United States Army to transport troops and supplies to various overseas destinations. In 1900 the Army bought out the ship placing it in service as the United States Army Transport Rosecrans but sold it two years later to Matson Navigation Company. The vessel was then converted into an oil tanker to carry oil from the West Coast to Alaska and Hawaii. Subsequently she was sold in 1905 to Associated Oil Co. to carry oil from California to various ports along the Pacific Northwest and Hawaii. In January 1913 while on one of her regular trips, the ship was wrecked off the mouth of the Columbia River with the loss of almost her entire crew.

== Design and construction ==
In 1882 Donald Currie & Co. decided to expand their fleet of steamers serving on their South African mail route and placed an order for two new steamers with Barclay, Curle & Co. Methven Castle was the second of these vessels and was laid down at the shipbuilder's yard in Whiteinch and launched on 19 September 1883, with Miss Maggie Gilchrist, daughter of James Gilchrist, being the sponsor. The ceremony was attended by several local dignitaries including Archibald Gilchrist, owner of Barclay, Curle & Co. and his son James.

Similar to many other vessels built for the Castle Line the ship was a three-deck type and had a large forecastle housing the crew. Methven Castle had her bridgehouse amidships built around the boilers and machinery. Passenger accommodations and amenities were located aft in deckhouses, and the vessel also possessed a large number of lifeboats. The ship was constructed with a possibility of her being called into Navy service with all three decks being built to be able to carry guns. The ship was also equipped with several steam winches capable to quickly load and unload cargoes from her holds.

As built, the ship was 335.0 feet (102.11 m) long (between perpendiculars) and 38.2 feet (11.64 m) abeam, and had a depth of 27.2 feet (8.29 m). Methven Castle was originally assessed at 2,681 GRT and 1,740 NRT and had deadweight of approximately 4,000. The vessel had an iron hull and a single 246 Nhp inverted direct-acting compound engine, with cylinders of 36-inch (91 cm) and 68-inch (170 cm) diameter with a 48-inch (120 cm) stroke, that drove a single screw propeller and moved the ship at up to 12 knots (14 mph; 22 km/h).

== Operational history ==
Following delivery and inspection, the ship sailed from Glasgow to London and after loading continued to Dartmouth. Methven Castle sailed out from that port on 15 December 1883 bound for South Africa via Madeira. After an uneventful journey the ship reached Cape Town on 10 January 1884. The steamer left South Africa on 20 February and returned to London on 22 March, successfully concluding her maiden voyage. Due to her fairly small size compared to other vessels plying between England and South Africa, the steamer was used very sparingly during the first five years of her career. Typically, the ship served various ports of the Cape Colony such as Cape Town and Mossel Bay and occasionally proceeded further to Natal. Starting in 1888 she was put on a regular schedule to South Africa and the service was further expanded to also cover Madagascar and Mauritius. Additionally, in compliance with the Castle Line mail contract obligations, Methven Castle also made occasional stops at Ascension Island and Saint Helena on her way down to South Africa. The ship continued serving this route through the end of 1896. The vessel arrived at London from her last trip from South Africa on 2 February 1897, and after unloading continued on to Glasgow where she were to be laid up. While there the vessel was sold to Sir William G. Pearce via his representative W.M. Rhodes (future director of the Fairfield Shipbuilding Co.) for subsequent transfer to Northern Pacific Line. The vessel was then chartered for one trip to the Orient and proceeded to Cardiff for loading and departed it on 29 March 1897 bound for Nagasaki with a cargo of 3,400 tons of coal. The vessel reached her destination at the end of May 1897 where she was renamed Columbia and transferred to her American owners. The ship then sailed to Hong Kong and after taking onboard cargo of various Oriental goods such as silk, tea and rice in addition to 120 passengers sailed for Victoria and Puget Sound ports via Yokohama. Columbia arrived at Victoria on 28 August, after a largely uneventful journey and successfully completing her first trip under new ownership.

Columbia conducted two more trips to the Far East in 1897. For example, on her third trip she carried full cargo of flour, lumber and other general cargo in addition to many passengers to China and Japan. On her return she ran into heavy gales and had her rails washed off and her rudder disabled for several hours. The vessel continued sailing on the same route through the end of August 1899. On 18 August 1899 it was reported that the U.S. Government chartered several commercial vessels, including Columbia, to transport troops and cargo to the newly acquired territories of the Philippines. Upon return from her last oriental trip Columbia proceeded down the coast to San Francisco, arriving there on 23 August. Once there, the vessel was officially chartered by the United States Army as of 25 August, at the rate of US$750 a day. After a quick check, Columbia loaded 635 officers and men of the Thirty Fourth Volunteer Regiment and sailed out for Manila on 8 September. After stopover for coaling at Hawaii, the transport continued her trip and reached her destination on 1 October. Columbia conducted one more trip to the Philippines, departing San Francisco on 30 November carrying elements of the Forty Second Regiment. Upon return in ballast from Manila on 10 February 1900, Columbia was put into quarantine for several days and then subsequently released from her charter.

Less than a month after her release Columbia was purchased by the U.S. Army for $147,200 and transferred to the Pacific Fleet to aid with transportation of troops and cargo to Alaska and the Philippines. The vessel was also renamed Rosecrans in honor of late general William Rosecrans. The transport then proceeded to Seattle and after loading her cargo of supplies and over 1,000,000 feet of lumber as well as 103 men of Seventh Infantry and fifty three other passengers departed for Port Valdez on 25 April. After unloading the cargo and her passengers the ship returned to Seattle in mid-May successfully completing her first voyage in government service.

USAT Rosecrans departed Seattle on 2 June on her next trip carrying two companies of the Seventh Infantry in addition to general merchandise, army supplies and over 800,000 feet of lumber bound for Nome. The journey was rather uneventful until the morning of 10 June, when the vessel ran into a heavy fog bank. The ship was eventually forced to anchor as the fog remained thick. The heavy fog prevailed in the area until the morning of 14 June, when it finally lifted and Rosecrans could continue her trip. As she continued north heavy ice fields were encountered forcing the vessel to carefully navigate through them. At about 03:00 on 15 June the ship suddenly ran onto a sand bar, located at roughly equal distance from both Nome and St. Michael's. About two hours later another steamer, SS Charles Nelson, came by and attempted to dislodge the grounded steamer but after breaking several hawsers and a steel cable departed the area for Dutch Harbor. An order was then given to lighten the vessel, and some cargo including general merchandise and some lumber were unloaded into life boats, surfboats and makeshift rafts. Tug Meteor arrived in the afternoon of 17 June, and after further unloading and preparation work was finished, managed to pull Rosecrans off the sand bar and into deep water. Meanwhile, due to increased wind many rafts and boats were blown away from the site of the rescue, and Meteor had to be dispatched to find them. After a long search several rafts and boats were brought but some of them were missing their cargo. Meanwhile, Rosecrans attempted to reach Nome, but due to prevailing ice she was forced to go into Dutch Harbor where she arrived on 20 June.

After her return Rosecrans was transferred to Philippines service and left San Francisco on 3 September with elements of Seventh Artillery bound for Manila via Nagasaki. The transport arrived at her destination on 7 October and remained in Asiatic waters for the next several months. On her next voyage the vessel carried elements of Fifteenth Infantry, the last American unit to leave China, to the Philippines. In January 1901 Rosecrans together with light cruiser Brooklyn and another transport Meade took part in rescue operation involving Sea Witch which was set on fire by her crew. Subsequently the transport was tasked with carrying more than thirty leaders of Philippine Revolution, including Pio del Pilar and Apolinario Mabini to the island of Guam. Upon return the ship together with several other Army vessels was assigned to return American volunteer troops to the United States. Rosecrans sailed out from Manila along with two other vessels on 16 March 1901 and arrived at San Francisco on 19 April.

After unloading Rosecrans sailed for Seattle where she was put into dock for repairs and installation of refrigerating equipment in preparation to her resumed service to Alaska. After completion of repair and overhaul, the transport sailed for St. Michael's in mid-August and returned at the end of September with the elements of the Seventh Infantry returning home from their deployment in Alaska. In November the transport again travelled to the Philippines carrying several companies of the Twenty Eighth Infantry as part of troop rotation. She sailed back to the West Coast in late January 1902 carrying men and officers of the Twenty Second Regiment and arrived at San Francisco on 24 February. While Rosecrans was scheduled to leave for Manila again on 10 March, she required some repairs and the War Department eventually decided to sell the vessel to the highest bidder with the bidding process starting in April 1902. The auction failed to attract much interest and the bidding period was extended into June, with the highest bid coming at US$39,000. The government decided not to accept any of the bids due to them being way below the appraised value of the ship and Rosecrans was laid up in Sausalito awaiting better offers. In July it was reported that the War Department received a higher offer for the ship and after some consideration the bid was accepted. Three days later it was announced that Rosecrans was sold for US$50,000 to the Matson Navigation Company who also announced their intention to convert the vessel into an oil carrier. The ship remained berthed in Sausalito until September when she was put into Union Iron Works dock for overhaul and conversion.

Rosecrans stayed in dock for nearly a year and remodeling work was finally finished in May 1903. Among other things, the ship was furnished with new tanks capable of carrying approximately 23,000 barrels of oil. After applying final touches the tanker entered oil trade to Alaska, and departed on 11 June for Nome and St. Michael's carrying cases of coal oil and dynamite in addition to crude oil in her tanks. On her way up to Alaska the vessel ran into ice floes near Nome and had her hull damaged as a result. She returned to San Francisco on 20 July, completing her first trip in a new capacity as a tanker. With the closure of navigation season in Alaska, Rosecrans was shifted into Hawaiian trade and sailed in October 1903 carrying oil and general cargo to the Hawaiian Islands. Rosecrans continued serving Hawaii, Alaska and the Pacific Northwest ports through the early part of 1906. On her return trips from Hawaii she either traveled in ballast or carried small loads of bananas and sugar. For example, in February 1905 the vessel transported 300 tons of sugar to San Francisco. The ship usually carried passengers from Alaska, but on occasion she also transported gold to San Francisco. For example, in September 1905 Rosecrans brought more than US$300,000 worth of gold dust and bullion from Alaska.

In summer 1905 rumors appeared about imminent sale of Matson's oil possessions in Southern California to a variety of their competitors. In March 1906 it was reported that Associated Oil Company acquired oil carrying and refining businesses from Matson Navigation, including National Oil and Transportation Co. and its associated assets. As a result, Rosecrans together with several other vessels were transferred to her new owners upon completion of the transaction. Under new ownership, the tanker largely continued serving the same general routes, carrying oil to Alaska, Pacific Northwest and Hawaii. In October 1908 the ship was equipped with wireless apparatus allowing for better communication with shore stations.

Rosecrans had rather uneventful career with Associated Oil until the very end. In February 1907 while being put into dock in Oakland for general maintenance the ship went aground, but was floated next day suffering only minor damage. In September 1909 it was reported that the tanker ran into a strong gale while en route to Alaska which caused considerable damage to her bridge and aerials. In November 1911 Rosecrans came to the rescue of the Alaska-Pacific Company's steamer M. F. Plant who became disabled with her tail shaft broken of Point Arena. Rosecrans took the disabled steamer under tow and safely brought her into San Francisco later the same day.

=== March 1912 Grounding ===
Rosecrans left San Francisco in ballast bound for Honolulu on 10 March 1912. She was first to call at Gaviota to load full cargo of oil. Upon arrival in the bay next day the ship dropped an anchor and also had two lines attached to buoys to secure her position. The ship had a crew of 36 including the captain, Lucien F. Johnson. During the night the wind picked up in the area, and a severe gale soon sprang out shortly after midnight. Due to the strength of the wind the lines holding the ship parted and the tanker was driven towards the shore away from the wharf. While the crew tried to rectify the situation, it proved to be unsuccessful and Rosecrans soon went aground on the rocks approximately 50 feet away from the shore. The crew continued their fight to save the vessel, however, the hull on the port side was soon breached by sharp rocks flooding the hold of the tanker and extinguishing the engine. By then help had already arrived at the shore and captain Johnson gave an order to abandon ship. The storm was still in full force with strong winds and large waves still prevailing which made rescue operation dangerous. Ropes were shot from the steamer towards the shore where they were caught by rescuers allowing most of the crew to be saved. Two men, a quartermaster and a carpenter, drowned when they tried to launch a lifeboat and were struck by a wave washing them both overboard.

The wreck of the tanker was examined a few days after grounding and it was decided to proceed with salvage operations. Pumps were placed into the ship's hold and divers started their work on raising the stricken vessel. The ship was successfully raised on 21 March, allowing the divers to start their patching work on the steamer's bottom. As the patching work went on, more and more holes were discovered and the refloating operations had to be postponed until most of the holes were covered. This work was largely finalized by the end of March and Rosecrans was successfully refloated on 2 April. The tanker immediately was taken to San Francisco where she safely arrived on 5 April in tow of tug Navigator. Rosecrans then entered the drydock at Union Iron Works to be examined on the amount and kind of damage sustained in her grounding. This survey showed that a large number of bottom plates were badly damaged or punctured in addition to her stern frame was set over, with the total estimate for repairs being approximately US$70,000. The repairs took a little over a month and Rosecrans was able to return to her usual service in early June.

=== August 1912 Fire ===
Rosecrans arrived at oil loading facilities at Gaviota from Redondo in ballast at around 15:30 on 27 August. The vessel had a crew of 42 men and was still under command of captain Lucien F. Johnson. Shortly after arrival the ship began loading her cargo of crude oil for delivery to San Francisco refineries. At around 18:30, while the crew was having their evening meal, an explosion occurred in one of the vessel's tanks near the engine room. A fire spread out immediately and the entire crew was forced to hastily abandon ship in lifeboats or by jumping overboard. After observing the fire subsiding somewhat the captain decided to go back aboard the ship to get the papers and personal belongings. While the crew was at work gathering possessions and clearing the debris, another explosion rocked the vessel throwing many of them overboard. The ship was again abandoned and continued burning through the night. One seaman was severely injured in the explosion and had to be taken to a hospital.

After the fires subsided the hulk of the tanker was examined and it was discovered that the damage was solely concentrated around the engine room with the bottom of the vessel being intact. Associated Oil then decided to rebuild the ship yet again, and she was towed the next day by two tugs to San Francisco for repairs, estimated to be approximately US$70,000. The repair work was finalized in early December 1912 with Rosecrans being fully rebuilt and available for service. Rosecrans left San Francisco on 15 December for her first post-rebuilding journey to the Pacific Northwest. The tanker arrived at Portland on 18 December with a cargo of 18,000 barrels of crude oil and after unloading it sailed back on the same day.

=== Sinking ===
Rosecrans left on her third post rebuilding trip from Monterey on 3 January 1913 carrying 23,000 barrels of oil bound for Portland. The tanker was still under command of captain Lucien F. Johnson and had a crew of 36. The voyage was largely uneventful until the tanker arrived in view of Columbia River in the early morning of 7 January. The weather was stormy and soon turned into a gale with strong rain and winds topping 60 miles per hour (97 km/h), all contributing to poor visibility. It is unclear if the tanker was dragged by the wind and currents further north away from the entrance into the mouth of Columbia River, or if the captain simply mistook the North Head Lighthouse for the Cape Disappointment Lighthouse or a lightvessel, but some time between 05:00 and 05:30 Rosecrans ran aground on the rocks of Peacock Spit, just beyond the bar. A distress signal was sent out immediately and was picked up by local life-saving stations. Due to position of the vessel, strong winds and large waves that were washing over the stricken tanker it was impossible for life savers to reach Rosecrans and they had to cruise around in their lifeboats awaiting the end of the storm. Two tugs, Oneonta and Tatoosh, were dispatched to the aid of the tanker; however, they also could not approach the ship.

Meanwhile, the tanker was beaten mercilessly by the waves against the rocks and soon the hull gave in and the vessel split into two around 10:30. Next the oil tanks ruptured releasing the tanker's cargo and splashing the crew. Rosecrans quickly sank with only her topmast and smoke stack sticking out from the water. The quartermaster was washed overboard at around 9:00 after going over to the deck to investigate. He spotted a large thick plank floating in the water and clung to it for about five and half hours slowly drifting north until he was washed ashore around 14:30 near Tioga Point. The majority of the crew ended up in water and drowned soon after the ship sank. Three other crewmen managed to stay above water by clinging to the main mast. However, since lifesavers still could not reach the stricken vessel due to large waves for extended period of time, one of the survivors fell down and died soon after. The two remaining men were eventually picked up by the life savers in the afternoon once it appeared the storm was abating, and made it to the shore by the day's end.
