= Light and Colour (Goethe's Theory) – The Morning after the Deluge – Moses Writing the Book of Genesis =

Painting by J. M. W. Turner

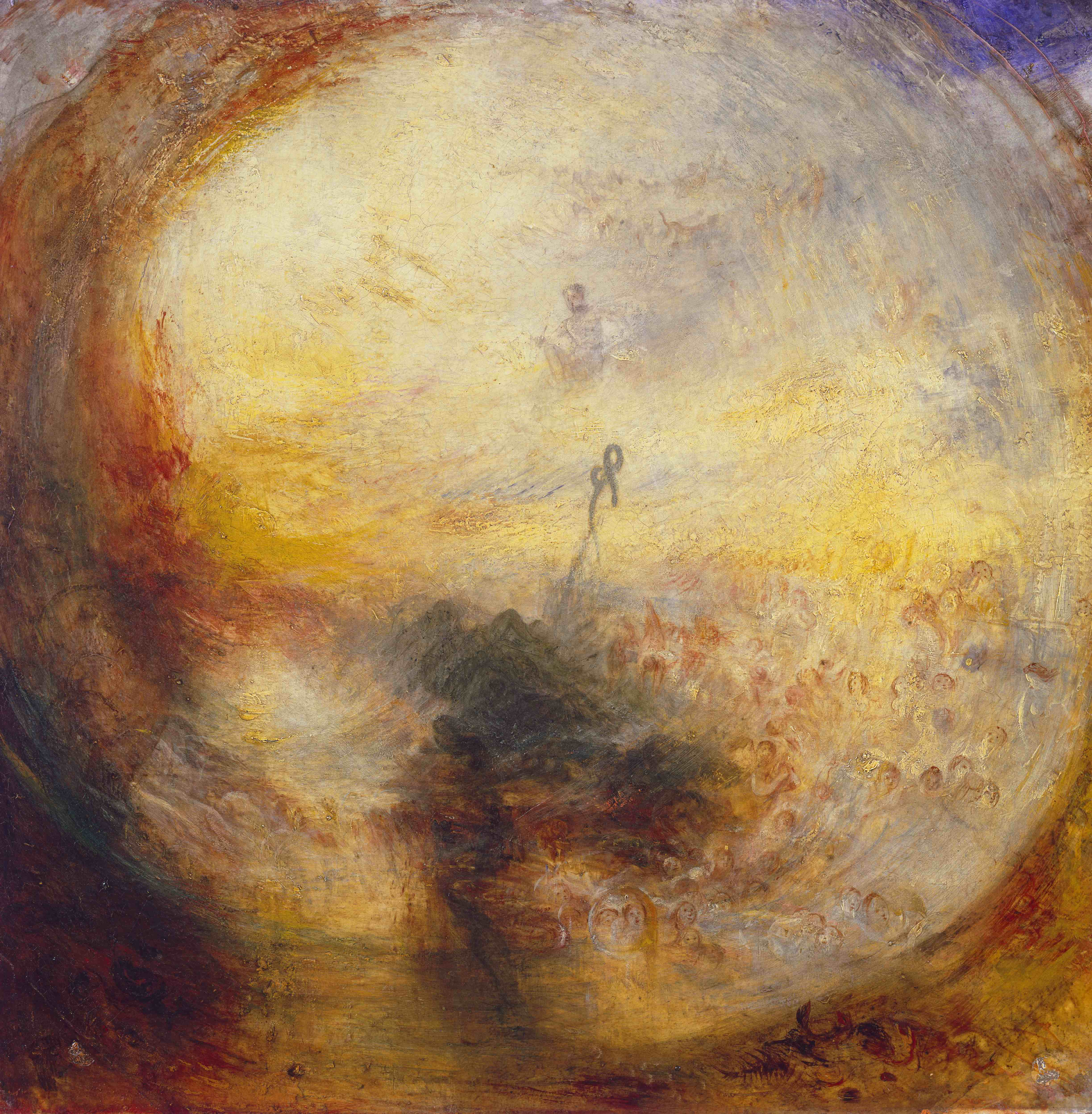
- Artist: Joseph Mallord William Turner
- Year: 1843
- Medium: Oil on canvas
- Dimensions: 78.5 cm × 78.5 cm (30.9 in × 30.9 in)
- Location: Tate Britain, London
- Owner: The Turner Collection
- Accession: N00532
- Website: tate.org.uk/...n00532

Light and Colour (Goethe's Theory) – The Morning after the Deluge – Moses Writing the Book of Genesis is an oil painting by the English painter Joseph Mallord William Turner (1775–1851), which first appeared at the Royal Academy Exhibition of 1843.

== Description ==
Made during the latter years of Turner's career, this painting depicts the aftermath of the Great Flood story told in the Book of Genesis. The role of man is portrayed as passive through his inability to control nature, which is beautiful to the eye yet has the power to destroy and recreate life. This piece also illustrates Turner's belief in God's omnipotence as it is He who creates the flood, allows Noah to survive, and inspired Moses to write the Book of Genesis. The Genesis leads back to the creation of man, light, and the water on which light is reflected on.

== Style ==
For most of his career Turner, whose works are predominantly subjective, was recognised for his watercolour and oil paintings that reflected landscape images and scenes of natural entities such as the weather, the ocean, the effect of light, and vision. Through the blurring of images, Turner attempts to justify the belief that the eye is always trying to form an image as it tries to recreate nature. Traditionally, colour is used as a type of accessory to form, but Turner's attraction to light and colour allows colour to take the place of form. The main colours used by Turner were red, yellow, and blue, which are discussed more in depth in relation to other works that influenced Turner. His work also illustrates his relationship to the Romantic movement and position as the precursor of the impressionist movement.

== Goethe's theory ==
As expressed in the title of the painting, Turner found interest in Johann Wolfgang Von Goethe's book, Theory of Colours also known as Zur Farbenlehre, published in 1810. Turner absorbed Goethe's theory of light and darkness and depicted their relationship in a number of his paintings. According to this theory, the creation of colour is dependent on the distribution of dark and light reflecting through a transparent object. Turner uses concepts from Goethe's theory, which is a rejection of Newton's Seven Colour Theory, and expresses the belief that every colour is an individualised combination of light and darkness. Newton's reasoning in his theory of light and colour was, in the words of Michael Duck, too simplistic for Goethe. As a result, Goethe found his own form of vision in the physiological aspects of the concept of colour. As a result, Goethe claims that there is an infinite amount of colour variation, and Turner attempts to reflect this theory through his paintings.

Turner also responds to the plus and minus concepts that Goethe created to address both emotions and the eye through the afterimage that is left on the retina after seeing an image. The plus addresses the colours red and yellow which are intended to evoke "buoyant" feelings, while the colour blue contrasts, creating the emotion of melancholy and desolation. According to Goethe's concept, yellow undergoes a transition of light becoming darker when light reaches its peak; just as the Sun shines in the sky, it develops into a colourless white light. But the light deepens and evolves the yellow into an orange and then finally to a ruby-red hue. Turner illustrates the process of yellow transitioning into phases of light by showing how, as the viewer moves away from the centre, the edges get darker.

== Symbolism ==
The yellow colouring of the painting is a reference to Goethe's Theory of Colours, which explains the colour yellow as being the first colour transmitted from light. The form of the painting is circular, symbolising the construction of the human eye, changing the focus of a typical linear splitting of space to a more subjective portrayal. The colour yellow is typically optimistic, but Turner attached the yellow to a light that is subject to change. The morning sun aspect of the colour is transient.

== Companion piece ==
- Turner's paired piece titled Shade and Darkness – The Evening of the Deluge was also exhibited in 1843. In this piece as well as The Morning After the Deluge, Turner makes no attempt to mirror the scene of the flood in its naturality.
- Fallacies of Hope is a poem that Turner supposedly wrote to parallel the two paintings.

== Frankfurt theft ==
Light and Colour was among three paintings stolen from a Frankfurt museum in 1994. Shade and Darkness was also taken. In 2002, the Tate Gallery covertly purchased Light and Colour on the black market for $2 million.

== See also ==
- List of paintings by J. M. W. Turner

== Acknowledgement ==
- Shown in the London Royal Academy 1843.
- The Tate Gallery (London), also known as the Tate Britain, housed many works of J.M.W. Turner including this piece.
