= Intelligence Squared =

British media company

- Founded: 2002; 24 years ago
- Headquarters: Holborn, London
- Founders: Jeremy O'Grady; John Gordon
- CEO: Matt McAllester
- Website: intelligencesquared.com

Intelligence Squared is a UK-based events and media company founded in London in 2002. It produces live talks, interviews, conversations between speakers, panel discussions, lectures, solo talks and occasional formal debates.

Its programme covers politics, culture, business, economics, history, technology, art, literature and science. The company stages events in London and other cities across the United Kingdom.

The company produces podcasts, video and digital content, publishing on YouTube, and other platforms. Intelligence Squared is often referred to as Intelligence^{2} and IQ2.

== History ==
Intelligence Squared was founded in 2002 by two media entrepreneurs, Jeremy O'Grady and John Gordon. In 2012, a majority stake in the company was bought by art consultant Amelie von Wedel, Yana Peel (President of Arts, Culture and Heritage at CHANEL), and Dr. David Knight Legg (partner at Serendipity Capital and chairman of Elements Global Advisors).

During the 2000s and 2010s, the Intelligence Squared name was licensed to independently operated organisations outside the United Kingdom. Intelligence Squared U.S. was established in 2006 as an independent American non-profit organisation. In April 2023, Intelligence Squared U.S. relaunched under the name Open to Debate. It continues as an independent American organisation focused on formal debate.

Intelligence Squared’s current programme is based mainly in the United Kingdom. The company produces one-off events overseas, usually with corporate partners and brands. Although formal debates remain part of its history and occasional programming, the company has broadened its events to include interviews, conversations, panels, lectures and solo talks.

== Programme and Format ==
Intelligence Squared produces live events in a range of formats. Many events are built around a newly published book or explore a wider political, cultural, historical, scientific or technological subject. Events commonly include questions from the live audience.

The company stages events in London and tours to cities across the United Kingdom, including Bristol, Brighton, Oxford, Bath, Manchester, Edinburgh and Guildford.

Recent speakers and participants have included Sir Keir Starmer, David Byrne, Mustafa Suleyman, Zadie Smith, Malala Yousafzai, Demis Hassabis, Lena Dunham, Arundhati Roy and Sir Tim Berners-Lee.

Intelligence Squared was historically known for its traditional Oxford-style debates, inspired by the Oxford Union. Another format the company produced was "Cultural Combat" debates, in which two cultural figures are pitted against each other. These began in 2013 with "Verdi vs. Wagner", which was staged at London’s Royal Opera House with a sixty-piece live orchestra, Stephen Fry in the chair, and John Tomlinson singing Wotan.

Debate topics included foreign policy, religion, history, social policy, politics, economics, science, technology, art, culture, and the environment.

== Podcast and Video ==
Many Intelligence Squared events are recorded and released through the company’s podcast and video channels, and released in full on the Intelligence Squared+ streaming platform.

In October 2026, Intelligence Squared announced a relaunch of its podcast offering, introducing a refreshed editorial format, a new line-up of presenters and a dedicated second podcast, Intelligence Squared Live. The flagship Intelligence Squared podcast, adopting the tagline Ideas That Matter, focuses on original, in-depth studio conversations with leading authors, thinkers and cultural figures, hosted by Mia Sorenti, Margherita Volpato and Conor Boyle. Meanwhile, Intelligence Squared Live was established as a separate platform for recordings of the company’s live talks and on-stage discussions.

The company also develops original and commissioned podcast series. Its programmes have covered politics, economics, culture, history, technology, climate change and international affairs.

Podcast series produced or distributed by Intelligence Squared include Hotels with History with Richard E. Grant for Perowne International, Pod Save the UK for Crooked Media, The Specialist for Sotheby’s, Energised for Iberdrola, The Intelligence Squared Economic Outlook for Guinness Global Investors and The Age to Come for IBM.

== Partnerships ==
Intelligence Squared works with companies, cultural institutions and non-profit organisations to develop events, podcasts and other editorial programmes. Its partnerships range from long-running content series to individual debates, private events and branded podcast productions, with Intelligence Squared providing services including editorial development, speaker curation, event production and digital distribution.

Among its clients includes Sotheby’s, producing talks as well as The Specialist podcast series, and Perowne International’s podcast Hotels with History, co-hosted by Richard E. Grant.

Intelligence Squared has also partnered with IBM on The Age to Come, a year-long programme examining the implications of emerging technologies for society, business, work and the global economy. The collaboration combines live events, podcast episodes, editorial content, video and social media.

Intelligence Squared has additionally collaborated with SXSW London on programming about misinformation and online culture, and with technology company Box on a series examining artificial intelligence and the future of work. Its wider roster of partners has included organisations such as Google, Chanel, Guinness Global Investors, Deloitte, WaterAid, Iberdrola, Havas, Coutts, eBay, Slack, Shopify, IG, Selfridges and Investec.
