= List of werewolves =

This is a list of fictional werewolves who appear in works of literature, television, comics, films and legends.

== Literature ==
Name	Author	Work	Notes
Bisclavret	Marie de France	Bisclavret	A noble baron who periodically transforms into a wolf becomes trapped in wolf form when his wife steals his clothes, which he requires to become human again. He is able to gain the favour of the king and loyally remains by his side. When his wife and her new husband appear at the king's court he attacks them, the king concludes they must have wronged the wolf and has them arrested, after the wife confesses and returns the Baron's clothes, he is able to become human again. A similar story features in Arthurian legend.
Vivian Gandillon	Annette Curtis Klause	Blood and Chocolate	A 16-year-old girl belonging to a pack of werewolves who falls in love with a human boy.
Trey Laporte	Steve Feasey	Changeling	A teenage werewolf who lives in London with his guardian; a vampire named Lucien Charron, Lucien's daughter Alexa and their human friend Tom. The series features Trey battling Lucien's evil brother Caliban (who was responsible for the deaths of Trey's parents (who were also werewolves)). Trey also has two werewolf forms; when wearing a chain necklace (which was previously owned by his father and grandfather) he can transform at will and his form resembles an anthropomorphic wolf and also can control his actions. When not wearing the necklace on a full moon, Trey's werewolf form resembles a normal wolf and he has no control over his actions. At the end of the series, Trey learns to transform at will without the necklace.
Reverend Lester Lowe	Stephen King	Cycle of the Werewolf	A self-proclaimed priest, The Reverend Lowe becomes a werewolf to murder people of the fictional town of Tarker's Mills, Maine, during each full moon over a year. Upon midnight on New Year's Eve, he barges into the Coslaw household but is shot and killed by 10-year-old Marty Coslaw with two silver bullets.
Grubbs Grady	Darren Shan	The Demonata	One of the main characters in The Demonata series by Darren Shan. He is the protagonist of the first book (Lord Loss), the third (Slawter), the fifth (Blood Beast) the sixth (Demon Apocalypse), the eighth (Wolf Island) and the tenth (Hell's Heroes).
Delphine Angua von Überwald	Terry Pratchett	Discworld	A Captain in the Ankh-Morpork City Watch, Angua is the daughter of the Baron and Baroness of Überwald. She first appears in Men at Arms, having rebelled against her family's werewolf lifestyle and moved to the city, where she joins the City Watch and begins a relationship with Captain Carrot Ironfoundersson. She reappears in several subsequent books in the series, including The Fifth Elephant, in which she returns to Überwald to confront her family.
Will Blake	R.L. Stine	Goosebumps	William "Will" Blake is the main antagonist of the Goosebumps book The Werewolf of Fever Swamp. Will Blake was a 12-year-old boy living in Fever Swamp who, at some point prior to the events of the book, became cursed with lycanthropy. As a werewolf, Will terrorized Fever Swamp, preying on local animals.
Miss Lupescu	Neil Gaiman	The Graveyard Book	Referred to as a "Hound Of God", she is a guardian to Nobody "Bod" Owens and saves him from a group of goblins.
Fenrir Greyback	J. K. Rowling	Harry Potter	A werewolf who is involved with the Death Eaters, allowed to use their robes but not ranking highly enough to carry the Dark Mark. He is known as the most savage werewolf to have ever lived and is greatly feared throughout the wizarding world.
Remus Lupin	J. K. Rowling	Harry Potter	A werewolf who was bitten by Fenrir Greyback at a young age. Despite wizarding society discriminating against werewolves, he briefly teaches at Hogwarts and fights against the Death Eaters.
Draugluin	J. R. R. Tolkien	Legendarium	Bred from the wolves and inhabited with an evil spirit sent by Morgoth himself, Draugluin was the sire of all werewolves of Beleriand, including Carcharoth, and lived with his master Sauron in Tol-in-Gaurhoth, the former watchtower of Finrod Felagund.
Bran Cornick	Patricia Briggs	Mercy Thompson	Bran Cornick is the most dominant werewolf in North America. He is more commonly known as The Marrok, who is the Alpha of all American Alpha Werewolves. He is witch-born on his mother's side, the Cornick Witch.
Adam Hauptman	Patricia Briggs	Mercy Thompson	Alpha werewolf of the Columbia Basin pack, located in the Tri-Cities in Washington State.
Lucian Greymark	Cassandra Clare	The Mortal Instruments	Born Lucian Greymark a Shadowhunter at birth and was later bitten by a werewolf, he left his home of Alicante and followed his friend Jocelyn Fairchild assuming a new identity of Luke Garroway.
Mitome Saizaki	Nisio Isin	Monogatari	Works for the Rumors Squad of the Naoetsu Police Department.
Jacob Black	Stephenie Meyer	Twilight	Native American werewolf of the Quileute tribe in La Push, Washington. He is one of Bella Swan's love interests.
Bram Moon	Ryan Hammond	Villains Academy	A young werewolf who attends the titular school to learn to be a villain like his parents.
Bertrand Caillet	Guy Endore	The Werewolf of Paris	A French illegitimate son who was born on Christmas Day, that fact is enough to curse him. He was then adopted by his relative Aymar Galliez who tries to contain the Bertrand's animal spirit, however, Aymar fails and the baser instincts of Bertrand are released in the way of lycanthropy. And since then, Bertrand will be involved in the Franco-Prussian War of 1870 and the establishment of the Paris Commune in 1871.
Drew Ferran	Curtis Jobling	Wereworld	A teenage boy who discovers that he is a werewolf and is the long lost son of his kingdom's late werewolf king Wergar. The series features Drew reuniting with his mother Queen Amelie (who is also a werewolf) and having encounters with other werecreatures including a werebear named Duke Bergen, a wereboar named Hector, a werefox named Lady Gretchen, and a werestag named Duke Manfred. He also has encounters with evil werecreatures such as his stepfather King Leopold (a Werelion, who killed Wergar) and his half-brother Prince Lucas (Leopold and Amelie's son, who is also a Werelion).

== Film ==
Name	Film	Notes
Tony Rivers	I Was a Teenage Werewolf	Tony is a troubled teenager who has a short temper. He is injected with a serum that causes him to transform into a werewolf.
David Kessler	An American Werewolf in London	While backpacking on the Yorkshire Moors, American college students David Kessler and Jack Goodman are attacked by a werewolf. Jack dies, but David survives and is cursed. Despite warnings from the decomposing spirit of Jack Goodman, David refuses to commit suicide, and as a result prowls the city of London (two nights in a row). He is played by David Naughton.
Ted Harrison	Bad Moon	Ted is the main antagonist of the movie. His identity as a werewolf is discovered by the family's German Shepherd Thor. He is portrayed by Michael Paré.
Joanie	Cursed	Originally a publicist, she became cursed with lycanthropy by Jake Taylor during a one-night stand, but he rejected her afterward. She decided to get her revenge on Jake by killing women that he fancied, and was eventually killed when trying to kill his then love interest, Ellie Myers. She is played by Judy Greer.
Ginger Fitzgerald	Ginger Snaps	The older sister of Brigette, she was attacked by a werewolf, but was saved by her and started to become violent and sassy when she comes after everyone in school. By the end of the movie, she transformed into the beast, and was killed by her sister where she stabbed her with a knife after trying to cure her with a dose of monkshood. She is portrayed by Katharine Isabelle in human form, while Nick Nolan portrays her monstrous form.
Wolfman	Legendary Giant Beast Wolfman vs. Godzilla	The Wolfman (狼男 Ōkami Otoko) is a werewolf-like Kaiju who first appeared in Shizuo Nakajima's 1972 Godzilla fan short, Wolfman vs. Baragon, and was set to appear in the fan film, Wolfman vs. Godzilla (伝説の巨獣狼男対ゴジラ Densetsu no Kyojū Ōkami Otoko tai Gojira, lit. Legendary Beast Wolfman vs. Godzilla) in 1983. Initially, the film was dropped and was not released in theaters. The Wolfman fought Godzilla in some shots during filming.
Cesaire	Red Riding Hood	It is revealed that the werewolf is Valerie's father who later bites Peter, Valerie's love-interest, turning him also into a werewolf.
Scott Howard	Teen Wolf	In the film, lycanthropy is inherited as Scott's father is also a werewolf.
Laurie	Trick 'r Treat	Laurie is one of the three main protagonists, alongside Sam and Rhonda. She is part of a coven of fellow Werewolves, led by her sister who convince her to lure in unexpecting men to their death. She is portrayed by Anna Paquin.
Michael Corvin	Underworld	A fictional character from the Underworld films, portrayed by Scott Speedman. He also appears in the novelizations of these films.
Watuma	The Werewolf	Lost silent film starring Phyllis Gordon as a young Navajo woman who turns into a she-wolf through witchcraft. This 18-minutes long film was the first to feature werewolves.
Lawrence "Larry" Talbot	The Wolf Man	The classic series of films from the 1940s which starred Lon Chaney Jr. as The Wolfman.
Willa Lykensen, Wyatt Lykensen, Wynter Barkowitz	Z-O-M-B-I-E-S	A trio of teenaged werewolves who possess the powerful moonstone necklaces. They are portrayed by Chandler Kinney, Pearce Joza, and Baby Ariel respectively.

== Television ==
Name	Show	Notes
Christa Stammers	Becoming Human	Christa is a high school student who recently became a werewolf.
Tom McNair	Being Human	Tom is a werewolf from infancy and cannot remember any life before having the condition.
Nina Pickering	Being Human	Nina becomes a werewolf after her boyfriend, who is a werewolf, scratches her during a transformation.
George Sands	Being Human	After being attacked by a werewolf in Scotland, George himself becomes a werewolf. He lives with vampire Mitchell and ghost Annie first in Bristol, then in Barry.
Thomas "Tommy" P. Dawkins	Big Wolf on Campus	Tommy Dawkins, portrayed by Brandon Quinn, is mauled by a werewolf. He is also the protagonist of the series.
Daniel "Oz" Osbourne	Buffy the Vampire Slayer	Friend of Buffy. portrayed by Seth Green, who ultimately learns to control his inner wolf.
Quentin Collins	Dark Shadows	Several characters featured in the 1966-1971 ABC cult TV Gothic horror-soap opera Dark Shadows. All variations of the character were played by David Selby.
Rafael Waithe	Legacies	He is a student at the Salvatore Boarding School for the Young & Gifted. Portrayed by Peyton Alex Smith.
Eddie Munster	The Munsters	Eddie, portrayed by Butch Patrick, is the werewolf son of Herman and Lily Munster, grandson of Sam Dracula and cousin of Marilyn Munster. Though apart from being a werewolf, he acts as a typical child. He also has a werewolf doll named "Woof-Woof".
Red Riding Hood/Ruby	Once Upon a Time	Red is affected by the genetically inherited lycanthropy at wolfstime. Her eyes change from green to gold while transforming.
Ansel	The Originals	He was an Alpha of the North East Atlantic Wolf Pack, the lover of Esther Mikaelson, the biological father of Klaus Mikaelson, and the grandfather of Hope Mikaelson. He was killed by Mikael, along with the majority of his pack, when Mikael discovered the affair between Ansel and Mikael's wife, Esther. Portrayed by Lloyd Owen.
Mary Dumas	The Originals	A member of the Crescent Wolf Pack, wife of Richard Xavier Dumas, and grandmother of Jackson Kenner. She is portrayed by Debra Mooney.
Keelin	The Originals	A member of the Malraux Werewolf Bloodline, she is the wife of Freya Mikaelson and mother of their son, Nik. Portrayed by Christina Moses.
Jackson Kenner	The Originals	He was one of the Alphas of the Crescent Wolf Pack, along with his wife, Hayley Marshall. He is the grandson of Mary Dumas and the stepfather of Hope Mikaelson. Portrayed by Nathan Parsons.
Hope Mikaelson	The Originals; Legacies	Hope Andrea Mikaelson is the tribrid daughter of Klaus Mikaelson and Hayley Marshall-Kenner. She is a hybrid of three different supernatural creatures: witch, werewolf, and vampire. She is portrayed by Alexandria and Victoria Collins as an infant in "Rebirth", unnamed toddlers in seasons 2 and 3 of The Originals, by Summer Fontana as a child, and by Danielle Rose Russell as a teenager.
Derek Hale	Teen Wolf	Portrayed by Tyler Hoechlin.
Isaac Lahey	Teen Wolf	Portrayed by Daniel Sharman.
Scott McCall	Teen Wolf	Scott McCall, portrayed by Tyler Posey, is the series' protagonist.
Mason Lockwood	The Vampire Diaries	Younger brother of Richard Lockwood and uncle of Tyler Lockwood. Portrayed by Taylor Kinney.
Tyler Lockwood	The Vampire Diaries; The Originals	Son of Richard and Carol Lockwood and the nephew of Mason Lockwood. He is portrayed by Michael Trevino.
Hayley Marshall-Kenner	The Vampire Diaries; The Originals	Hayley is the Alpha of the Crescent Wolf Pack of Louisiana. She is the mother of Hope Mikaelson, and is the widow of Jackson Kenner. She is portrayed by Phoebe Tonkin.
Niklaus "Klaus" Mikaelson	The Vampire Diaries; The Originals	Klaus is the Original Hybrid (half-werewolf, half-vampire). He is portrayed by Joseph Morgan.
Garth Fitzgerald IV	Supernatural	Portrayed by DJ Qualls. He was bitten by a werewolf while hunting werewolves
Enid Sinclair	Wednesday	Enid, portrayed by Emma Myers, is an Alpha werewolf who is a friend of Wednesday Addams and the student of Nevermore Academy.
Eric Cord	Werewolf	College student Eric Cord is forced to kill his werewolf best friend, and is now on the run. Whilst a fugitive, Eric must find the originator of his werewolf bloodline and destroy it. Unlike usual werewolf fiction, Eric's transformation occurs at random instead of a full moon.

== Animation ==
Name	Work	Notes
Freddy Lupin	100% Wolf	The main character belongs to a family of werewolves who are night vigilantes that protect their town and have an ongoing feud with dogs, on his thirteenth birthday he has his first transformation and turns into a were-poodle.
Hug Wolf	Adventure Time	A type of werewolf that is obsessed with hugs.
Why-Wolf	Adventure Time	A type of werewolf that is inquisitive and self-aware of their bloodlust.
Theodore Seville	Alvin and the Chipmunks Meet the Wolfman	After being bitten by the strange neighbor Mr. Talbot, Theodore is infected with lycanthropy to transform into a werewolf. At nighttime, he initially acts like a harmless puppy, and at daytime he acts rude and sarcastic. When the full moon rises, and during the school play for Dr. Jekyll and Mr. Hyde, Theodore becomes a fully savage werewolf and attacks Mr. Talbot (in his werewolf form), until their second bite cure them both.
Wilford B. Wolf	Animaniacs	A nerdy wolf who assumes a muscular form during full moons. He has a crush on Minerva Mink.
Blitzwolfer	Ben 10	In the third season episode of the original series "Benwolf", when saving Wildvine, Ben Tennyson accidentally earns the power of the werewolf-like alien that added its DNA to his Omnitrix watch by scratching it. In Ben 10: Omniverse, his alien transformation is much better known as Blitzwolfer, with powers including a sonic howl and an enhanced strength.
Ty Parsec	Buzz Lightyear of Star Command	Parsec is a space ranger who was temporarily transformed into the Wirewolf, a robotic werewolf.
Fangface	Fangface	Sherman "Fangs" Fangsworth transforms into a werewolf named Fangface whenever he sees the moon, a picture of the moon, or anything resembling the moon.
Wayne	Hotel Transylvania	One of Dracula's best friends in the film series.
Fluffy	Johnny Bravo	A beautiful young woman who turns into a werewolf during the full moon that appeared in the episode "A Wolf in Chick's Clothing". She went on a date with Johnny who was willing to tolerate her werewolf form and several quirks that came with it because she would change back at sunrise. She later revealed she is also cursed to turn into a short bald man named Melvin every Wednesday.
Clawdeen Wolf	Monster High	She is the daughter of a werewolf.
Red/Catalina	Rapunzel's Tangled Adventure	A former thief and friend of Rapunzel. In the third season episode "Who's Afraid of the Big, Bad Wolf?", Red is inflicted with a werewolf curse that targets those with suppressed anger, which she learns to control.
Big Bob Oakley	Scooby-Doo, Where Are You!	In the first season episode "A Gaggle of Galloping Ghosts", a criminal actor dons one of his monster disguises, the Wolfman, to scare the Mystery Inc. gang at Franken Castle.
Winnie Werewolf	Scooby-Doo and the Ghoul School	Winnie is one of the five students of Miss Grimwood's Finishing School for Girls.
Yuki, Ame	Wolf Children	A pair of werewolf siblings who were raised by their human mother Hana after their werewolf father, a man who Hana met in college and fell in love with, died shortly after Ame was born.
Mebh Óg MacTíre, Moll MacTíre	Wolfwalkers	Based on Irish mythology, wolf-walkers are humans who have the ability to become wolves when their human bodies are asleep.

== Comics ==
Name	Publisher	First appearance	Notes
Captain	Dark Horse Comics	Hellsing vol. 3	Captain possesses immense superhuman ability, even while in human form. This includes superhuman senses, strength (strong enough to bend steel bars or shatter limbs with a single kick), speed, reflexes/reactions, agility, dexterity, flexibility, coordination, balance, and endurance.
Evo	DC Comics/Wildstorm	Gen¹³ (vol. 2) #7 (1996)	Real name Michael Heller, Evo is a member of the superhuman team DV8 and one of few young men and women selected to be part of Ivana Baiul's Gen¹³ project at International Operations. Heller gladly agreed to join the program because it, as he put it, " it beats spending eight months in juvie hall."
Warren Griffith	DC Comics	Weird War Tales #93 (1980)	A member of the Creature Commandos who initially had clinical lycanthropy, irrationally believing himself to be a werewolf. He is converted into an artificial werewolf by the scientists of Project M, with his transformation being independent of the moon's cycles. However, Griffith's transformations are unstable and initially random due to a flaw in the process that gave him his powers.
Ian MacCobb	DC Comics	Swamp Thing "Monster on the Moors!" (vol. 1) #4 (1973)	The son of an elderly couple living on the moors of Scotland, and which is suffering from lycanthropy
Charlie Tidwell	Marvel Comics	The Incredible Hulk (vol. 4) #1 (2023)	A teenage girl who becomes the host of the entity Lycana, giving her the ability to transform into a humanoid winged wolf.
Werewolf by Night	Marvel Comics	Marvel Spotlight #2 (1972)	Born Jacob Russoff, his lycanthropy is inherited from a long line of lycanthropes whose curse was triggered by their ancestor Gregor Russoff's exposure to the Darkhold, a book of dark magic.
Wolfsbane	Marvel Comics	The New Mutants graphic novel (1982)	A Scottish mutant and member of the X-Men and New Mutants who possesses the ability to transform into a wolf.
Jimmy	Tapas	Fangs "Odditorim" (2019)	The romantic partner of Elsie, a vampire.

== Video games ==
Name	Work	Notes
Valkhayn R. Hellsing	BlazBlue: Continuum Shift II	One of the Six Heroes, he is a werewolf butler whose astral heat shows his full werewolf form, and his attacks showcase a large wolf beast form.
Cornell	Castlevania: Legacy of Darkness	A member of a warrior clan cursed to transform into beast-men. He has the ability to control his change as a werewolf as well as the only one of his brethren to refuse to join the forces of Dracula. His rival Ortega also transforms into a werewolf. Cornell reappears in Castlevania Judgment.
Jon Talbain	Darkstalkers	A werewolf, part of Capcoms 'Darkstalkers' roster, who through lycanthropy can transform at will, mixing martial arts and a set of nunchuk weapons with vicious biting and claw techniques, finishing with the ability to summon 2 Chinese dragons made of flame to blast his foes. In Japan, Jon Talbain is listed under a different name, known as Gallon.
Banehallow	Defense of the Ancients	He is one of the playable hero characters who is commonly referred to in-game as Lycan. He reappears in the following sequel Dota 2.
The Companions, Sinding	The Elder Scrolls V: Skyrim	The Companions are an ancient group of warriors based in the mead hall Jorrvaskr within the city of Whiterun, the senior members of the Companions known as "The Circle" which includes Kodlak, Skjor, Aela, Farkas and Vilkas have the ability to transform into werewolves. Sinding is a Nord first encountered in Falkreath jail in the quest "Ill Met by Moonlight" who is revealed to be a werewolf who was cursed by the Daedric prince Hircine for stealing a ring. Various characters with lycanthropy can be encountered throughout the game and the player has the ability to become a werewolf.
Dire, Lucien West (Lycan West)	Fortnite	Dire is an anthropomorphic werewolf skin. He is seen wearing a bandana, a vest, and torn shorts with a belt buckle. Lycan West is the Werewolf alternate Skin of Lucien West. Transformed into a Lycan, he retains his personality and mental control. Lucien West briefly served as a minor protagonist in Fortnite's Chapter 4: Season 4. While his Lycan West appearance debuted in Chapter 6: Season 4 during Fortnitemares 2025. Lucien West is a Vampire Hunter and a member of The High Stakes Club, alongside Joni the Red and Helsie. Lucien West's most definitive trait is being strongly protective, especially to his Club Members. He has tendency to prioritize others often, which leads him to neglect his own needs.
Sabrewulf	Killer Instinct	A German aristocrat, Baron Konrad von Sabrewulf, often named Sabrewulf or just Wulf, and known as hímiinhaama is afflicted with the rare disease lycanthrophy. He desperately seeks a cure to his condition before losing himself to his animalistic side.
Warwick	League of Legends	During his past life as a human, Warwick was a Zaunite gangster who decided to retire from crime and live a better life as a good and honest man. He was eventually captured and experimented on by the mad scientist Singed, who pumped him full of chemicals containing spliced monster DNA in an attempt to transform him into the "beast" he was deep down inside. Although Singed's experiments initially killed Warwick, they later resurrected him as a lycan with an insatiable thirst for blood.
Silas, Chris Hackett, Caleb Hackett, Kaylee Hackett and determinantly some of the player characters if infected.	The Quarry	They are large humanoids, brown in color and with red eyes born from a curse. They possess great strength and bite other people causing a speed infection that will convert them. They live in Hackett's Quarry summer camp. Silas was the first victim seen in the game, though how he got the curse is unknown. This would infect Chris Hackett and his children Caleb and Kaylee, who would transform every night of the full moon. To break the curse, the other members of the family would try to cure them by killing Silas. Chris would later bite Max Brinly. The protagonists of the story can also be infected, but some manage to save themselves (Bobby destroying his finger if Nick bites him and Dylan when Ryan cuts off his hand.
Lycans	Resident Evil Village	They are a semi-intelligent mutant human species who are noted for canine-like characteristics. They were innocent once people of the village who worshiped Mother Miranda as their god, by granting them with a parasite called Cadou, which was created by the mold from the Megamycete. From 1919 to 2021 they had carved out their territory in an isolated mountain village, where they preyed upon other humans. Lycan possess more intelligence than most of the other monsters such as the moroaicâ in the game as shown by their use of bow and arrows and riding horses. Lycan are believed extinct following the region's destruction by the Fungal Root.
Sonic the Werehog	Sonic Unleashed	Sonic unwillingly gains a werewolf-like form, known as the "Werehog", after being infected with Dark Gaia's power.
T'inque Arcana	Star Ocean: First Departure	An 18-year-old Lycanthrope who transforms into a dark blue werewolf at the beginning of every battle.
Vincent Meis	The Witcher	The head of the city guard who reveals himself to be a werewolf when Geralt investigated a werewolf that was killing criminals in the city.
Werewolf Cookie	Cookie Run	Werewolf Cookie was created while adding great amount of pepper into his dough, a wolf hair had fallen in by accident. Everytime his wolf instinct kicks in, he is able to transform into a feral beast. Being able to destroy obstacles in the process.
Wolf Princess	The Liar Princess and the Blind Prince	She is a large wolf monster who transforms into a human princess in exchange for her singing voice to the witch so that she can save the prince after accidentally blinding him.
Worgen	World of Warcraft	In this game, Worgen are the werewolf-like monsters the player can fight in the Shadowfang Keep dungeon. Also World of Warcraft: Cataclysm, Worgen are playable race, being able to switch from human and werewolf forms.
Yugo the Wolf	Bloody Roar series	The main protagonist and young Japanese wolf zoanthrope who was fighting to uncover the circumstances of his mercenary father's death, brought upon from fighting in a South American country. He raided the Tylon corporation along with his father's friend, the French lion zoanthrope and fellow mercenary named Alan Gado. After the events of the first game, Yugo goes into hiding and makes a career as a champion boxer, while also taking under his wing a teenage boy by the name of Kenji. Kenji (later known as Bakuryu the Mole) was kidnapped by the Zoanthrope Liberation Front and Yugo sets out to rescue him. After the successful rescue, Gado also convinces him to lead the fight for equality between humans and zoanthropes alike.

== See also ==
- Werewolf fiction
