= Death's Shadow (novel) =

2008 novel by Darren Shan

- Author: Darren Shan
- Cover artist: Melvyn Grant
- Language: English
- Series: The Demonata
- Release number: 7
- Genre: Horror, Fantasy novel
- Publisher: HarperCollins
- Publication date: 1 May 2008
- Publication place: Ireland
- Media type: Print (hardback & paperback)
- ISBN: 0-00-72603-93
- OCLC: 1089613472
- Preceded by: Demon Apocalypse
- Followed by: Wolf Island

Death's Shadow is the seventh book in Darren Shan's The Demonata series, released 1 May 2008.

Darren Shan has stated that he originally planned for the book to be called S.S Demonic, but that the title was vetoed by his editor due to its similarity to the previous book in the series, Demon Apocalypse.

It is published in the United Kingdom and the United States.

== Plot ==
The book starts with the recollections of Beranabus. In this we learn his mother was a woman named Brigitta, who at sixteen was due to marry a prince. However, the prince had angered a powerful priestess and for revenge she summoned a demon who kidnapped her. Months later she was sent back by the demon pregnant with his offspring. The prince calls in a favor from King Minos, and she was brought to the labyrinth of Daedalus to be slaughtered by the Minotaur, though she gave birth before her death. The half-demon child, with a strange way with animals, placates the Minotaur, who begins to care for the infant. Many years later, Theseus entered the labyrinth and slew the Minotaur. Discovering the young Beranabus, he attempts to bring the boy with him before being frightened off by his yellow eyes. Beranabus remains in the dark, eventually leaving to mature into the most powerful magician born.

In the present, Bec becomes acclimated to being alive once more, and the strangeness of the modern world, eased by accessing Bill-E's memories still within his brain. Six months have passed since they prevented the apocalypse, with Bec growing increasingly uncomfortable after telling Dervish about Bill-E's memories, which he asks to be recounted to him in his grieving. Bec finds that in her new body she has gained the ability to absorb memories and emotions from other people with a touch. Meera's visits give Bec a measure of emotional support as she attempts to avoid all physical contact. One day an Reni confronts Bec about Grubbs and Bill-E, and learns that Reni feels guilty about her brother's Loch's death after touching her, scaring Reni when she recounts her deepest feelings back to her. Meera comes to visit again Bec, who inadvertently absorbs some of her deepest memories. During the next visit by Meera, Bec eventually admits that Dervish is using her power to connect to Bill-E's memories vicariously, leaving her feeling used. Meera gets Bec to confront Dervish immediately, and the two begin to reconcile. Meera bursts in, explaining that three werewolves have broken into the house. Bec, Dervish and Meera retreat to the magically defended study. Trapped, they try an obvious escape route outside, but discover there are gunmen marking the house. However, Dervish reveals that he has two escape routes. When one fails they decide to use the other and after a fight with the werewolves, they end up at the secret cellar. Dervish has a heart attack and Meera calls the Disciples, but only Shark and Sharmila are available. Bec reveals to her she can absorb memories from people by touching them and reveals the attack came from the Lambs. By the time Shark and Sharmila arrive, the werewolves and the mysterious human gunmen have disappeared. Dervish is taken to the hospital while Shark and Meera go off to search for Beranabus to get his help, suspecting the Lambs are after Bec.

In another flashback, Beranabus eventually finds his way out of the labyrinth, and found years in the dark caused daylight to be painful to his eyes. Travelling by night, the boy was scatterbrained and feral, but he had a gift to tame any wild beast and find friendship everywhere. He goes from place to place until he finds a small village being attacked by an octopus-like demon. Curious, he follows it through a window into the Demonata universe. He went from realm to realm, taming many demons he came across and running away from those he couldn't with incredible speed. He eventually winds up back on earth and becomes stranded there when the window closes behind him. Wishing you return to the other universe, Baranabus travelled across the world to find an open window. He finds himself in Ireland, where a Tunnel has been opened, allowing a demon invasion. As he goes from place to place admiring the carnage, he starts to feel unease. Drust finds him and Beranabus realizes Drust is looking for the tunnel to the Demonata universe like him. He allows Drust to alter his brain and use him to find a group of people to help them get there. He recruits Bec and her people and they travel towards the tunnel. He falls in love with Bec and after losing her, he gains a measure of human sanity and puts his demonic interests behind him.

Dervish is in the hospital, his wealth allowing him his own room and guards on the same floor. On the roof, Bec senses demons entering the hospital and warns the others. They take Dervish out of his room and up towards the roof, where the guards have arranged for a helicopter to take them away. But before it can land it is attacked, a hideously mutated Juni Swann at the forefront of the demons. The demons overcome Sharmilla and start eating her legs. Bec briefly fights Juni, and the demonic magic present lets Dervish recover, who hurls an attack at her. They go down again, but Bec convinces the other to go to the maternity ward to save the babies. Another fight breaks out before a window opens up and Beranabus, Kernel, Shark, Meera and Grubbs show up. The demons retreat as their window closes and the rest of the demons are picked off by Shark, Kernel and Meera. After the demons are dealt with an evacuation begins and everyone gathers on the roof to discuss events and their next moves. They decide to split up again; Beranabus, Bec and Kernal will take Sharmilla and Dervish into the Demonata universe, as they now need its magic to maintain their bodies while Grubbs, Shark and Meera will go after the Lambs. Baranabus' group end up in an abandoned universe that has a strange oasis of bone trees and a conscious well. Legs are fashioned for Sharmila, who regains consciousness, while Dervish is taught how to maintain his heart by Bec. Kernel, with magically fashioned eyes, finds he can see new patches of light he didn't see before, but which he can't control. He also can keep tabs on multiple people across dimensions. He keeps a track on Juni, then when she leaves Lord Loss's realm they open a portal to her, and after finding out it is a place full of magic all of them move in after her.

After losing Bec, Bran maintains a vigil in the cave for several months. Eventually he kisses the ground and chooses to leave. Bran had planned to retrace his step, which forced him to think ahead, something which until this point was alien to him; his experiences with Bec allowed Bran new pathways of thought. Bran attempts to commit suicide on the shore, but is saved by a group of Old Creatures, ancient entities of powerful magic and light utterly opposed to the Demonata, and preservers of mortal life. The Old Creatures tell Bran he could see Bec again and give him the will to live on, and spend over a century educating Bran until he can speak and reason. They encourage his hatred of demons, teach him how to open windows and send him on missions to kill demons. One day he returns to their cave to find it vacant. He tracks the last remaining Old Creature in Newgrange, who tells them it is their time to leave Earth; humanity has to fend for itself with him as their guardian. The Old Creature tells Bran of the Kah-Gash, a weapon that could destroy a universe, then leaves, leaving Earth bereft of Old Creature magic then explains about the Kah-Gash before leaving Earth behind. He then set out on the mission to find the Kah-Gash and remove the threat of the Demonata by destroying their entire reality.

Beranabus, Sharmilla, Kernel, Dervish and Bec arrive on a boat, a luxury cruise liner which has been systematically slaughtered. They discover that the ship is encased within a bubble of magic, akin to Slawter, which allows Sharmila's artificial legs and Dervish's heart to work. Leaving Kernel behind to guard the window, the others proceed to the lower decks. Here they find the professional Disciple spy Kirilli Kovacs who explains how he had been tracking two mages that were working for somebody else and waiting for orders on when to open the window. When it was opened the demons came through and tortured and slaughtered everyone, then Juni repaid them by killing them and bathing in their remains. They are now convinced it is a trap for them but Beranabus tells them they are in the endgame now and have to proceed. They make it to the bottom deck where Juni is waiting for them smug that they would willingly walk into her trap. Lord Loss talks to them through Cadaver and offers them the chance to join him, and when refused demands Bec from them. They refuse again and Cadaver is sacrificed to open a lodestone, letting the Shadow, a tentacled monster with no face, causing all the dead on the ship to animate impossibly. It goes after Bec and as the others fight the zombies, it catches her and she learns its true nature. She relays this by magic to Beranabus who turns into his full demon form in order to fight it and break the lodestone. When he succeeds, the Shadow is pulled back, but still pierced Beranabus's head several times, killing him. The group fight their way to the top deck and back to Kernel they make it towards Kernel, only for a strange explosion to make Kernel and his window disappear. With the bubble still around the ship, the group is trapped. Sharmilla, whose prosthetic legs are broken, to sacrifice her to break the bubble. Once done, Bec takes Kirilli's magic to free a lifeboat and send it to the hole, created by Sharmilla's sacrifice, leaving the group stranded in the middle of the ocean with minimal supplies as the ship sinks nearby. Bec reveals the nature of the Shadow, a universal force that was granted unnatural consciousness when Bec was brought back from the dead, the Shadow is Death incarnate.
