= Death's Shadow =

Death's Shadow may refer to:

- Death's Shadow (Midsomer Murders), an episode of the TV series Midsomer Murders
- Death's Shadow (novel), a 2008 novel by Darren Shan
