= Hell's Heroes =

Hell's Heroes may refer to:

- Hell's Heroes (film), a 1929 western
- The Inglorious Bastards 2: Hell's Heroes, a 1987 Italian war film and the sequel to The Inglorious Bastards.
- Hell's Heroes (book)
- Hell's Heroes (music festival)
