= Kwaku Fortune =

Irish actor

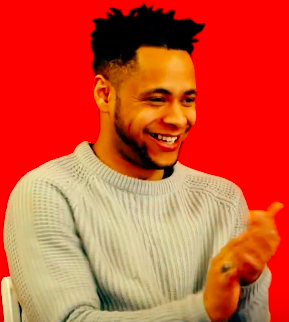
- Fortune at the 2019 Dublin International Film Festival
- Born: Roundwood, County Wicklow, Ireland
- Education: The Lir Academy
- Occupation: Actor
- Years active: 2011–present

Kwaku Fortune is an Irish actor.

== Early life and education ==
Fortune is from Roundwood, County Wicklow. He is of Ghanaian descent on his mother's side. He graduated with a bachelor's degree in Acting from The Lir Academy at Trinity College Dublin in 2017.

== Career ==
Fortune's early work includes roles in various short films and the main role of Tobi in 2011 RTÉ miniseries The Importance of Being Whatever.

Post-graduation from The Lir, Fortune landed the role of Finn in the 2017 film Kissing Candice. He then made his stage debut with Playboyz, a modern interpretation and version of J.M. Synge's The Playboy of the Western World, which featured in the 2017 Dublin Theatre Festival.

In 2018 Fortune took part in On Raftery's Hill and a stage adaptation of the novel Asking for It by Louise O'Neill.

Fortune was on the Diversity on Screen panel at the 2019 Dublin International Film Festival. He played the role of Julian in the Sophie Hyde directed 2019 film Animals. That same year, Fortune narrated the perspective of Leon in an audiobook of The Flatshare by Beth O'Leary alongside Carrie Hope Fletcher for Macmillan Audio. Theatre-wise, Fortune reprised his role in Asking for It as well as starring in Peat and They Float Up.

== Filmography ==
=== Film ===
Year	Title	Role	Notes
2017	Kissing Candice	Finn	
2019	Animals	Julian	
2019	A Girl from Mogadishu	Receptionist	
2022	Luck	Gael (voice)	
2024	Cult Killer	Glenn	
2024	TWIG	Eddie	

=== Television ===
Year	Title	Role	Notes
2011	The Importance of Being Whatever	Tobi	Main role
2020	Normal People	Philip	Recurring role
2021	Line of Duty	DS Marks	Episode #6.1
2021–2023	Hidden Assets	Josh Ola	Main role
2022	Redemption	Michael Dunne	Episode #1.5
2024	The Dry	Dec	2 episodes

== Stage ==
Year	Title	Role	Notes
2017	Playboyz	Patrick	Dublin Theatre Festival, The New Theatre
2018	On Raftery's Hill	Dara Mood	Abbey Theatre
2018, 2019	Asking for It	Eli	The Everyman, Gaiety Theatre, Abbey Theatre
2019	Peat	Ray	The Ark, Dublin
2019	They Float Up	Darnell	Bewley's, Dublin
2021	The Beauty Queen of Leenane	Ray	Lyric Theatre, Hammersmith
2025	Dancing at Lughnasa	Michael	Crucible, Sheffield Royal Exchange Theatre, Manchester

== Audio ==
Year	Title	Role	Notes
2019	The Flatshare	Leon	Macmillan Audio
