= Blood Beast =

2007 book by Darren Shan

- Original cover, showing the scorpioid demon, Spine.
- Author: Darren Shan
- Cover artist: Melvyn Grant
- Language: English
- Series: The Demonata
- Release number: 5
- Genre: Horror, Fantasy novel
- Publisher: HarperCollins
- Publication date: 4 June 2007
- Publication place: Ireland
- Media type: Print (hardback)
- Pages: 262 pp
- ISBN: 978-0-00-723132-4
- OCLC: 82671611
- Preceded by: Bec
- Followed by: Demon Apocalypse

Blood Beast is the fifth book in Darren Shan's The Demonata series and was released 4 June 2007. It is narrated by Grubbs Grady, the narrator of Lord Loss and Slawter. The plot is part of a two-part story, which continues in book six. Though the previous four books have not been in chronological order, this book is the furthest book into the future. It mainly deals with whether or not Grubbs Grady will be struck with lycanthropy and how he will deal with it. This book has been nominated for several prizes.

The title was originally announced at the Edinburgh Book Festival. In 2007, Blood Beast was nominated for the Nickelodeon Kids' Choice Award in the UK, but lost to Harry Potter and the Deathly Hallows by J.K. Rowling.

== Plot summary ==
Blood Beast takes place about a year after the events recounted in Slawter. Grubbs Grady is back in Carcery Vale. His life seems to have settled down at last. He's getting on well with Dervish. Grubbs has been struggling to contain the magical talent he discovered in the town of Slawter. He doesn't want to become a Disciple and he hopes his abilities will fade if he hides them long enough. His magician's prowess is growing all the time. He is having dreadful nightmares and suspects he might be turning into a werewolf.

Things come to a head when Grubbs and his friends, Loch and Bill-E decide to go on a treasure hunt. While exploring a tunnel that leads to a cave, Grubbs hears a scream behind him and turns to find Loch's lifeless body on the floor, blood seeping from his head. Bill-E leaves to get help, and Grubbs attempts unsuccessfully to resuscitate Loch, whose heart has stopped. Dervish returns with Bill-E and they dispose of Loch's body in a nearby quarry. Dervish explains that the cave is a potential doorway for demons to enter the human world and it is his responsibility to safeguard it.

Grubbs returns to school, and meets with the new psychologist, Juni Swan, whom he had previously met in Slawter. Juni also has a gift for magic. She becomes romantically involved with Dervish who teaches her more spells.

For several nights around the time of the full moon, Grubbs has a difficult time and is in extreme pain. Juni suggests that they should meet at the cave. Grubbs runs to the cave, where he turns into a werewolf. When he returns to a human state, he finds that he has killed Bill-E's grandparents and legal guardians. Not wanting to kill again, he and Juni decide to run away. They board a plane and Grubbs falls asleep. When he awakes, the cockpit opens and demons appear on the plane, and then begin attacking the passengers. Is Juni a friend or foe?
