= Bec (novel) =

2006 novel by Darren Shan

- Original cover of Bec. This picture is of Drust's evil brother, Brude.
- Author: Darren Shan
- Cover artist: Melvyn Grant
- Language: English
- Series: The Demonata
- Release number: 4
- Genre: Horror, fantasy
- Publisher: HarperCollins, Little, Brown
- Publication date: 5 June 2006
- Publication place: Ireland
- Media type: Print (hardback)
- Pages: 272 pp (first edition, hardback)
- ISBN: 0-00-723131-8 (first edition, hardback)
- OCLC: 70267025
- Preceded by: Slawter
- Followed by: Blood Beast

Bec is a book by Darren Shan in The Demonata series. It is the fourth book of the series released but it is the first chronologically. The protagonist of the book is the central character Bec. It is set in Ireland around 1600 years ago. The last line of the book, "Screams in the dark," is also the first line of the book, as well as the tagline for the novel. Bec is the end of the first part of the Demonata books, where the three protagonists are introduced.

== Plot ==
When a "simple child" named Bran who can run incredibly fast comes to Bec's demon-besieged rath, she and a small consignment of warriors go with him, including the chief's son, Connla, who is "largely untested" in battle; Goll, an old warrior; Lorcan and Ronan, two teenage twins; Fiachna the blacksmith; and Orna, a female warrior. During the journey, the group is attacked by demons, but manage to hide near some ancient lodestones which protect them with powerful Old Magic. Eventually, Bran leads them to a crannóg, where everyone is dead except a druid, Drust. The druid tells them about a tunnel to the demons' world, and how he aims to destroy it. They go with him.

The group finds some horses which help them reach their destination in time, but Fiachna is soon abandoned after his wound becomes life-threatening.

Bec manages to force Bran through the closing tunnel at the last moment with the last of her magic, but is trapped as a result. Soon after, Lord Loss appears and tells Bec that when she appeared to absorb power from him several days earlier, Lord Loss had actually intended for that to happen so that she could close the tunnel. This is because Lord Loss is unique among demons, in that instead of wishing to slaughter all the humans in the world, he actually prefers to prolong the suffering for as long as possible. If the tunnel had remained open, countless other demons would have passed through and destroyed all of mankind within a matter of weeks, which would have ruined Lord Loss' "sport". After telling Bec this, Lord Loss reminds her of the geis that he had placed on her, and that he is bound by his word to kill her. Lord Loss sets his familiars upon Bec, and without any magic to defend herself with, she is easily overwhelmed and killed.
