= Ian Lloyd Anderson =

Irish actor

- Born: 4 June 1986 (age 39); Dublin, Ireland
- Occupation: Actor
- Years active: 2010–present

Ian Lloyd Anderson (born 4 June 1986) is an Irish actor best known for his role as Dean in Love/Hate. In 2015, Anderson joined the cast of the HBO series Game of Thrones in season 5 as Derek.

== Personal life ==
Anderson is married with children and resides in Dublin. He has expressed a lack of desire in pursuing an acting career in Hollywood.

== Filmography ==
=== Television ===
2023	My Norwegian Holiday	Marc	Hallmark
2008	The Clinic	Simon Owen	Episode: #6.4
2012	Raw	Jimmy	Episode: #4.3
2010–2014	Love/Hate	Dean	
2014	Standby	Jimi	
2015	Game of Thrones	Derek	Episode: The Gift
2019	Headcases	Ian	Episode: #1.1
2018–2020	Blood	Paul Crowley	
2020	Vikings	Naad	5 episodes
2021	Modern Love	Yannis	Episode: A Second Embrace, with Hearts and Eyes Open
2021	Magpie Murders	Brent	5 episodes
2022	Redemption	Niall Kilduff	Main role
2025	Safe Harbor	Mr. O'Brien	Series regular

=== Film ===
Year	Title	Role	Notes
2018	Dublin Oldschool	Daniel	
2020	Herself	Gary	
2020	The Cherry Orchard	Yasha	
2021	Deadly Cuts	Deano	

=== Theatre ===
Year	Title	Role	Notes
2016	Dublin Old School	Daniel	Project Arts Centre, Dublin
2016	Dublin Old School	Daniel	2017 Fringe, The Pleasance, Edinburgh
