= Dublin Oldschool =

Irish play by Emmet Kirwan and movie directed by Dave Tynan

- Directed by: Dave Tynan
- Screenplay by: Dave Tynan; Emmet Kirwan
- Produced by: Michael Donnelly; Dave Leahy
- Starring: Calum Jess; Malcolm Denby; Emmet Kirwan; Ryan Farrell; Libby Conway Dunne; Stephen Jones
- Cinematography: JJ Rolfe
- Edited by: John O'Connor
- Music by: Gareth Averill
- Production companies: MDV; Warrior Films
- Distributed by: Element Pictures
- Release dates: 29 June 2018 (Ireland); 19 October 2018 (United Kingdom)
- Running time: 95 minutes
- Country: Ireland
- Language: English

Dublin Oldschool is a 2018 film starring Emmet Kirwan, Ian Lloyd Anderson, Seana Kerslake and Sarah Greene The film was directed by Dave Tynan and is based on a play originally written by Emmet Kirwan that debuted in 2014.

== Plot ==
Jason is an aspiring DJ in Dublin who is addicted to narcotics. He later meets his brother Daniel, an educated heroin addict without a home. The two men reconnect during a weekend. Jason continually runs into his double, who has his phone. He attempts to connect with this seemingly secondary self, but is consistently thwarted in his efforts. At the end of the play, time doubles back on itself, and Jason seems to be reliving the day again.

== Play ==
The play premiered in 2014. Both Kirwan and Anderson prefer acting on stage than acting in a film. It won the Best Fringe Performers Award at the Tiger Dublin Fringe Festival. The play was shown at the Project Arts Centre twice. The stage version was characterized by a highly physical stage presence, an almost complete lack of set, and the use of lighting to denote changes in space and time.

Paul Taylor, writing for The Independent gave a positive review of its 2017 run at the National Theatre in London saying, "Emmet Kirwan's two-hander, starring himself as Jason, a wannabe DJ and Ian Lloyd Anderson, as his long-lost drug addict brother, is highly charged theatre."

Michael Billington of The Guardian gave a negative review of the same run at the National Theatre saying, "If Kirwan can harness his verbal power, he may yet write a play that offers more than a sensory impression."

== Film release ==
The film was released on 29 June 2018 in Ireland theatres. The play's writer, Emmet Kirwan, plays the role of Jason and Ian Lloyd Anderson plays the role of Daniel. It is directed by Dave Tynan. The film expands on the two character play with added characters including Sarah Greene as Jason's friend Lisa and Seana Kerslake as Jason's former girlfriend. Kirwan stated he hopes that the film will foster awareness of the homeless and drug addicts. Screen Ireland and Windmill Lane Pictures helped with the production. The film was released on DVD and on demand on 9 November 2018 in Ireland and on 11 November 2018 in the United Kingdom.

Paul Whitington of the Irish Independent gave the film a negative review that states, "Tynan's film is laden down with aimless chatter, and its plot meanders drearily towards a country rave that seems curiously old-fashioned, and feels like a piece of Dublin's past, not its present."

== Film cast ==
- Calum Jess as Young Jason
- Malcolm Denby as Young Daniel
- Emmet Kirwan as Jason
- Ryan Farrell as Young Boy
- Libby Conway Dunne as Young Girl
- Stephen Jones as Bobby
- Liam Heslin as Dave the Rave
- Ciaran Grace as Glen
- Mark O'Halloran as Bates
- Ian Lloyd Anderson as Daniel
- Mark O'Rowe as Man with Cat
- Sarah Greene as Lisa
- Leah Minto as Aisling
- Aaron Heffernan as Aaron
- Seána Kerslake as Gemma
