= Zom-B =

Series of books which deals with a zombie apocalypse from the zombie perspective

- Zom-B, the first book of the series.
- Zom-B (2012); Underground (2013); City (2013); Angels (2013); Baby (2013); Gladiator (2014); Mission (2014); Circus (2014); Clans (2014); Family (2014); Bride (2015); Fugitive (2015); Goddess (2016)
- Author: Darren Shan (O'Shaughnessy)
- Illustrator: Warren Pleece and Nick Stearn
- Cover artist: Warren Pleece and Cliff Nielson
- Language: English
- Genre: Horror and zombie apocalypse
- Publisher: HarperCollins
- Published: 2012–16

Zom-B (alternatively known as the Zom-B Chronicles) is a young adult zombie apocalyptic-thriller novel series by written by Irish author Darren O'Shaughnessy under the pen name Darren Shan. The series is told by first-person perspective of B Smith, a teenager turned into a zombie. Like Shan's previous series, Zom-B is notable for exploring themes of racism, xenophobia, and the sociological concept of "us and them".

The series has received a universally positive critical reception.

== Works ==
=== Publishing order ===
Cover illustration copyright Warren Pleece

1. Zom-B – 27 September 2012 (16 October 2012 in the US)
2. Zom-B: Underground – 3 January 2013
3. Zom-B: City – 14 March 2013
4. Zom-B: Angels – 20 June 2013
5. Zom-B: Baby – 26 September 2013 (1 October 2013 in the US)
6. Zom-B: Gladiator – 2 January 2014
7. Zom-B: Mission – 27 March 2014
8. Zom-B: Clans – 3 July 2014
9. Zom-B: Family – 25 September 2014
10. Zom-B: Bride – 1 January 2015 (24 February 2015 in the US)
11. Zom-B: Fugitive – 10 September 2015 (22 September 2015 in the US)
12. Zom-B: Goddess – 22 March 2016

A short novella titled Zom-B: Circus, set between Zom-B: Gladiator and Zom-B: Mission, was released on 27 April 2014, following one of B's teachers, Cat Ward.

== Plot ==
The series centers around Becky "B" Smith, who finally rejects her racist father at the beginning of a zombie apocalypse after being forced by him to throw a black classmate to the zombies. B later has her heart ripped out by the same classmate. Awakening eighteen months later as a "reviitalised" zombie, B explores the world at large, the ongoing battle between Dr. Oystein and his Angels and Mr. Dowling and his mutant-controlled zombies. The series also explores B's own connections to the instigators of the apocalypse, including the Owl Man and a mysterious group of babies. The majority of novels in the series are written as concluding with a cliffhanger leading to the subsequent book, structured in a manner similar to television serials.

== Characters ==
In the first novel, the titular B Smith is described with gender neutral terms until the final chapter, in which their first name is revealed to be Becky. The decision to leave B's gender initially ambiguous was explained by Shan to allow the reader to question their own assumptions and biases with regards to the way B acts and how women "should" be written in works of fiction.

=== Smith–Dowling family tree ===
Todd Smith / Dad	Daisy Smith / Mum	Dr. Oystein	Schlesinger Dowling
Clements Dowling	Mr. Dowling	Becky Smith / B	3 Children	Barnes
3 Daughters	Owl Man	Holy-Moly Smith	The Babies	The Angels (Note: Consisting of Cian, Awnya, Ashtat, Jakob, Carl, and Shane.)	Stuart

=== Overview ===
Character		Zom-B												
Character		Zom-B	Underground	City	Angels	Baby	Gladiator	Mission	Circus	Clans	Family	Bride	Fugitive	Goddess
Main characters
Becky "B" Smith		Main	Main	Main	Main	Main	Main	Main	Guest	Main	Main	Main	Main	Main
Tom White	Owl Man	Main	Mentioned	Main	Mentioned	Main	Mentioned	Main	Mentioned	Main	Main	Main	Main	Main
Zachary Dowling	Owl Man	Main	Mentioned	Main	Mentioned	Main	Mentioned	Main	Mentioned	Main	Main	Main	Main	Main
Mr. William "Billy" Burke		Main	Main	Mentioned	Main	Main	Guest	Guest		Mentioned	Mentioned	Mentioned	Mentioned	Mentioned
Vinyl "V"		Main	Mentioned					Main		Mentioned	Main	Mentioned	Mentioned	
Todd Smith / Dad		Main	Mentioned	Mentioned	Mentioned	Mentioned	Mentioned	Mentioned	Mentioned	Guest	Main	Mentioned	Mentioned	Mentioned
Daisy Smith / Mum		Main	Mentioned	Mentioned	Mentioned	Mentioned	Mentioned	Mentioned	Mentioned	Mentioned	Zombie	Mentioned	Mentioned	Mentioned
Mrs. Lynne Reed		Main						Mentioned	Mentioned			Main		
Michael "Rage" Jarman			Main	Mentioned	Main	Main	Main	Main		Main	Main	Guest	Mentioned	Main
Reilly			Main	Mentioned	Main	Guest	Guest	Guest					Main	Main
Josh Massoglia			Main	Mentioned	Mentioned	Mentioned	Mentioned	Mentioned			Main			Main
The Zom Heads (Note: Consisting of Cathy, Tiberius, Mark, Gokhan, Peder, and Danny.)			Main	Mentioned	Mentioned	Mentioned	Mentioned	Mentioned			Recap			Mentioned
Barnes				Main			Main	Main		Mentioned	Mentioned		Main	Corpse
Coley				Main			Main			Main	Main		Mentioned	
Timothy Jackson				Main		Main	Mentioned	Mentioned			Mentioned	Mentioned	Mentioned	Mentioned
Sister Clare of the Shnax				Main	Mentioned	Mentioned	Mentioned						Zombie	
Dr. Oystein Dowling				Voice	Main	Main	Main	Main	Mentioned	Main	Mentioned	Mentioned	Main	Main
Master Zhang					Main	Main	Main	Main		Guest	Mentioned		Main	Main
The Angels					Main	Recurring	Main	Main		Recurring	Mentioned	Mentioned	Recurring	Main
Holy-Moly Smith		Guest	Mentioned			Main	Mentioned	Mentioned	Guest		Guest	Main	Main	Main
Emma							Main	Main	Guest	Guest				
Declan							Main	Main	Guest	Guest				
Lord Daniel Wood	Dan-Dan						Main	Mentioned		Main	Main	Mentioned	Mentioned	Mentioned
Vicky Wedge							Main	Mentioned		Mentioned	Main	Mentioned	Mentioned	Main
Justin Bazini							Main	Mentioned		Mentioned	Main	Mentioned	Mentioned	Main
Luca Wood							Main	Mentioned		Mentioned	Mentioned			
Sakarias								Main		Main	Main	Guest	Guest	Main
Mr. Albrecht Dowling			Guest	Guest	Mentioned	Mentioned	Mentioned	Mentioned	Main	Mentioned	Guest	Main	Main	Main
Kinslow			Guest	Guest					Main		Guest	Main	Main	Main
Cat Ward		Guest							Main					

== Reviews ==
Zom-B opened to largely positive reviews by critics.

- Olivia Johnson (Kirkus Reviews):

Shan brings back his tried-and-true shock and gore narratives, with gruesome brain scooping and death-defying action sequences. Troubled by divided loyalty between father and friends, B's character is well-drawn though occasionally naïve; B often elects not to make any choice in difficult situations, and Shan doesn't fully explore the consequences of those moments of inaction. The English slang may cause momentary trouble, but tension over immigration crosses the pond easily enough. Shan packs in the bites, and he rips out enough entrails for even the most jaded zombie fan; the cliffhanger ending, now expected by his fans, closes on just the right note to leave the audience gnawing for more. A series opener to sink your teeth into.

- Brown Little (Publishers Weekly):

Shan [e]nters the zombie genre in a thoroughly bloody fashion with this slow-burning horror piece, which opens a planned 12-book series. Character development is impressive for a relatively short book, and Shan executes the transition from normalcy to wholesale terror masterfully. It's a strong start, but there's a lot of story left to go.

- Martin Chilton (The Telegraph)

[Zom-B is] a clever mix of horror, fantasy and realism – about the damaging 'virus' of racial hatred and social paranoia. The horror scenes are well choreographed and not without the useful escape valve of humour. There is some earthy language ("I thought she was going to chew me a new arsehole," says B Smith) but it fits the tone and characters in the book rather than seeming gratuitous.

- Ian Berriman (GamesRadar):

Dealing in some decidedly edgy material and a brilliant secondary twist that'll have you kicking yourself for being taken in, Zom-B is a book that'll make young readers think as well as making them gag. With its kids who smoke, shoplift and talk of "copping a feel", Zom-B almost makes the existing Young Adult zombie series, Charles Higson's The Enemy, look like the Blue Peter to its Grange Hill, even though Higson's books are pretty damn ruthless themselves.

- Rachael Simpson (Blind Dog Books):

These books aren't beautifully written works of art but they are mindless fun with a deeper message if you want to get into it. The characters are really interesting and the plot twists are always wild. Though that being said things are pretty deep at times, this series makes you feel really sorry for the person who's the villain and it forces you to question everyone at all times. Also there's a lot of racist themes throughout so be aware of that before you start reading these books. I love the journey B goes on and was so much more interested in them trying to justify the racism that they see from their father and that they find themselves involved in than the zombies themselves. I really love character growth and think if it's done well then it's so amazing.

== Adaptation ==
In May 2019, Zom-B was optioned for a ten-part television series adaptation by London-based production company The Electric Shadow Company. In March 2020, it was announced that The Electric Shadow Company had partnered with Slam Films in developing the series. In March 2021, Susan E. Connolly was announced to be attached as the lead writer on the project, with The Electric Shadow Company releasing a teaser image depicting a blood-spattered B Smith opposite her best friend Vinyl to their website.

In December 2022, Darren O'Shaughnessy confirmed that while the series' television pilot script "didn't get any takers in the UK", that it was still in active development in "a different part of the world" as a non-English language series. In January 2024, O'Shaughnessy announced that the adaptation was "no longer under option" following an unsuccessful succession of pitches in Finland.
