= Emmet Kirwan =

Irish actor, playwright and screenwriter

Emmet Kirwan is an Irish actor, playwright and screenwriter. Emmet is known for starring in RTÉ2's Sarah & Steve and for writing and starring in the 2014 play, and 2018 movie version of Dublin Oldschool. Other credits include parts in Ella Enchanted, '71 and Inside I'm Dancing. In 2012 he performed Just Saying, a monologue written and directed by Dave Tynan, which to date has received over 500,000 views on YouTube.

== Early life and education ==
Kirwan grew up in the Raheen area of Tallaght. He attended St. Mark's Community School and became involved with the Dublin Youth Theatre. He then studied theatre studies and acting at the Samuel Beckett Centre in Trinity College Dublin, graduating in 2001.
