= The Thin Executioner =

2010 novel by Darren Shan

- Author: Darren Shan
- Language: English
- Genre: Children's novel, Fantasy novel, dark comedy novel, adventure novel
- Publisher: HarperCollins
- Publication date: 29 April 2010
- Publication place: (Republic of Ireland) Ireland
- Media type: Print (hardcover)
- Pages: 496 pp (first edition, hardback)
- ISBN: 0-00-73158-48 (first edition, hardback)
- OCLC: 464590174

The Thin Executioner is young adult and dark fantasy novel written by Irish novelist Darren O'Shaughnessy under the pen name of Darren Shan, published in April 2010. Inspired by and partially adapting Adventures of Huckleberry Finn by Mark Twain and The Firework-Maker's Daughter by Philip Pullman, Shan cited Middle Eastern influences for the novel's tone, describing the novel as his "favourite out of all his books [to have written]."

== Plot synopsis ==
Jebel is the third son of his kingdom's executioner Rashed Rum, seen as the most respected individual before the king; as such, family is honored as royalty. After Jebel is left out of his father's retirement speech informing the kingdom that his two older sons will battle in a competition to see who will have the honor of succeeding him executioner — Jebel having been left out due to his thin and scrawny stature, Jebel is (in his eyes) forever publicly disgraced. Subsequently, Jebel makes the rash decision to embark on a quest to Tubaygat, a holy mountain and home to the fire god Sabbah Eid, a being who supposedly grants questors invincibility and long life in exchange for a human sacrifice. Accompanied by slave Tel Hesani, Jebel embarks on a dark and brutal journey filled with lynch mobs, suicide cults, terrible monsters, and worse, monstrous men. But to Jebel, the risk is worth it.

== Reviews ==
The Thin Executioner opened to largely positive reviews by critics.

- Ira V. (TheGuardian.com)

The story is so exciting, with many twists and turns and the descriptions are so vivid that I found myself totally absorbed. You will find humour, excitement, suspense – fantasy at its best.

- Brown Little (Publishers Weekly):

Although Shan takes on imperialism and organized religion (the [pair of] con artists are named Bush and Blair), the politics intertwine smoothly with the travelers' adventures and don't overwhelm the encounters with assorted threats. While the ending is never in doubt, Shan delivers an exciting adventure en route.

- L. Pahomov (Slam Media):

I loved every character that show up in this story, I liked the expected and almost clique ending, and I like how satisfied I was after reading this book. The Thin Executioner is a very good read for young adults and even teaches readers to come to accept those that are different, which is a very important lesson for young adults these days.

- Olivia Johnson (Kirkus Reviews):

Readers familiar with Huckleberry Finn may recognize parallels between Hasani and Jebel and Jim and Huck, a deliberate echo that is perhaps this book's greatest success. Heads roll at the start, but by the end, Shan reaches for the heartstrings.

- Summer Lane (Writing Belle):

What ensues is a book filled with many adventures. Shan's dialogue is quick and oftentimes witty. Tel Hesani is a character you begin to feel sympathetic with. Jebel, on the other hand, is a little tiring. It's sometimes very hard to root for a protagonist who's okay with sacrificing his slave's life to obtain honor and glory. It's a very entertaining book. Once it starts, it never stops. Jebel's adventures begin from Chapter One and stretch to the very last page. The prose flows well, the quest storyline is appealing and you'll enjoy a satisfying – albeit a bit predictable – ending.
