= Susan E. Connolly =

Irish writer

- Born: Susan E. Connolly c.1980 Ireland
- Occupation: Writer
- Website: seconnolly.co.uk

Susan E. Connolly is an Irish fiction and non-fiction writer who has worked in comics, screenwriting, short fiction and novels. In March 2021, Connolly was announced to be attached as the lead writer of Zom-B, a television series adaptation of the novel series of the same name by Darren Shan. In 2022, Connolly wrote two episodes of the six-part television crime drama Redemption.

== Life and career ==
Connolly was born Susan Elizabeth Connolly in Ireland where she was educated and completed a degree in Veterinary Medicine and a diploma in Statistics at University College Dublin. She completed a PhD in St John's College, University of Cambridge, in the Medical Research Council Biostatistics Unit.

While in UCD Connolly worked as the Science & Technology Editor as well as the Comment & Opinion Editor for The University Observer, the university's award-winning student newspaper. Her first novel, Damsel, was published by Mercier Press in 2009 under the pen name S.E.Connolly, while her historical comic book, Gráinne O’Malley: Queen’s Gambit, was published by Atomic Diner in 2015. Connolly was the winner of the BBC’s Scriptroom 7. She was selected for European Writers Club 2022 – Boosting Ideas. Connolly has also had work published by Clarkesworld, Strange Horizons and The Center For Digital Ethics.

== Screenwriting ==
- Redemption (2022)
- Hidden Assets (2023)
- The Iris Affair (upcoming)

== Bibliography ==
- Damsel (Mercier Press – 2009)
- Gráinne O’Malley: Queen’s Gambit (Atomic Diner – 2015)
