= Baal (video game) =

1988 video game

- Developers: Psygnosis; The Creative Assembly (MS-DOS); Probe Software (C64)
- Publisher: Psyclapse
- Designer: Wayne Smithson
- Platforms: Amiga, Atari ST, Commodore 64, MS-DOS
- Release: 1988
- Genres: Platform, shoot 'em up
- Mode: Single-player

Baal is a platform-based shoot 'em up video game published in 1988 by Psygnosis. The player takes on the role of a "Time Warrior" sent into the recesses of hell to recover pieces of "The War Machine", which has been stolen by the evil minion Baal. The game was ported to MS-DOS by Tim Ansell of The Creative Assembly.

== Plot ==
On 6 June 1999, a team of archaeologists discovered an ancient doorway that, when unintentionally opened, awakened Baal, a forgotten demonic entity, and his army of evil creatures. Baal's army storms the humans and manages to seize a weapon of war that allows their master to rule over and enslave humanity. In desperation, humanity holds a council of war that plans a counterattack to recover the stolen weapon and eliminate Baal. It is decided to create the Time Warriors, a futuristic combat unit that must infiltrate, by teleportation, the enemy's lair. The stolen weapon has been scattered there and must be found because the fate of humanity depends on it.

== Gameplay ==
The player takes on the role of the Time Warriors' leader and must progress through levels in multi-directional scrolling profile view. The player must eliminate monsters with a laser gun while avoiding traps, including landmines, energy barriers and precipices that hinder progress. To advance through the levels, the player must disable the energy barriers by first destroying the energy generators that power them. This involves memorizing the locations to be destroyed and performing the appropriate action sequences to progress through the game. In addition, progressing through the enemy lair requires collecting the components of the stolen weapon that have been scattered throughout the levels. Progression is also achieved by controlling a Back Reactor vehicle.

Other items are also scattered throughout the game and can be collected. This is particularly the case for the laser rifle, whose power can be increased by collecting power units. The laser rifle may also need to be recharged at a terminal after intensive use.

== Development ==
The cover artwork was created by Melvyn Grant, and the logo was designed by Roger Dean.

== Reception ==
Reception

Review scores
Publication	Score
ACE	730/1000 (Amiga) 726/1000 (Atari ST) 700/1000 (DOS)
The Games Machine (UK)	65/100 (Amiga) 81/100 (Atari ST) 61/100 (C64)
Tilt	18/20 (Atari ST)

French magazine Tilt praised the quality of achievement, the labyrinth-like progression system of the game, its Satanic atmosphere, as well as the richness of the bestiary. The gameplay is compared to Obliterator, an action-adventure title developed by Psygnosis and released in 1988.

Computer and Video Games considered that the search for and deactivation of the energy doors gives the game puzzle elements. Julian Rignall described the soundtrack as one of the best ever heard on the Atari ST. The game's save system, which was not very common at the time, was also praised.
