= The Iris Affair =

2025 British television series

- Genre: Thriller
- Created by: Neil Cross
- Showrunner: Neil Cross
- Written by: Neil Cross; Susan E. Connolly; Ian Scott McCullough
- Directed by: Terry McDonough; Sarah O'Gorman
- Starring: Niamh Algar; Tom Hollander; Meréana Tomlinson; Sacha Dhawan; Maya Sansa; Marco Leonardi; Lorenzo De Moor; Angela Bruce; Antonio Gargiulo; Peter Sullivan; Debi Mazar; Kristofer Hivju; Harry Lloyd
- Country of origin: United Kingdom
- Original language: English
- No. of series: 1
- No. of episodes: 8

Production
- Executive producers: Neil Cross; Terry McDonough; Adrian Sturges; Dante Di Loreto; Jenni Sherwood
- Producer: Tim Bricknell
- Running time: 44–61 minutes
- Production companies: Sky Studios; Fremantle; Wildside

Original release
- Network: Sky Atlantic
- Release: 16 October – 13 November 2025

The Iris Affair is a British thriller television series created by Neil Cross, and stars Niamh Algar and Tom Hollander in the lead roles. The series premiered on 16 October 2025 on Sky Atlantic.

== Cast and characters ==
=== Main ===
- Niamh Algar as Iris Nixon, an enigmatic genius mathematician and puzzle solver
- Tom Hollander as Cameron Beck, a wealthy private investor pursuing Iris
- Meréana Tomlinson as Joy Baxter, a wayward teen and student of Iris
- Sacha Dhawan as Alfie Bird, a YouTuber and former journalist who reports on the search for Iris
- Maya Sansa as Inspector Nico Casterman, a Polizia di Stato officer in Sardinia
- Marco Leonardi as Chief Commissioner Enrico Bruni, the leader of a group of corrupt mainland Polizia di Stato detectives
- Lorenzo De Moor as Vice Inspector Teo Solinas, a Polizia di Stato officer in Sardinia
- Angela Bruce as Meski, Beck's head of security
- Antonio Gargiulo as Commissioner Tommaso Krauss, a corrupt Polizia di Stato detective
- Peter Sullivan as Julian Baxter, Joy's father
- Debi Mazar as Celia Baxter, Joy's stepmother
- Kristofer Hivju as Professor Jensen Lind, the creator of Charlie, a revolutionary quantum device
- Harry Lloyd as Hugo Pym, the acting head of the Intragroup Committee, who helped Beck finance Charlie's construction

=== Supporting ===
- Simon Rizzoni as Deputy Commissioner Claude Baptiste, a corrupt Polizia di Stato detective and Krauss's partner
- Salvatore Ruocco as Bernardo De Santis, a corrupt Polizia di Stato detective
- Amina Zia as Dia Ramachandran
- Adrian Paul Jeyasingham as Mani Chopra, a scientist working for Beck
- Alessia Deband as Carlotta Solinas, Teo's wife
- Alessia Yoko Fontana as Ako Nakamura
- Alessandro Pess as Frederico "Freddo" Zonin, the leader of a group of youths who are tracking Iris
- Frances Barber as Etta Friedman, Alfie's former publicist
- Julia Messina as Akim

== Episodes ==
List of The Iris Affair episodes
No.	Title	Directed by	Written by	Original release date
1	"Charlie Big Potatoes"	Terry McDonough	Neil Cross	16 October 2025
Private investor Cameron Beck recruits genius puzzle solver Iris Nixon to re-activate Charlie, a secret and potentially world-changing sentient topological quantum device with two million Qubits of processing power. The activation sequence is in the encrypted diary of its conscious-yet unresponsive creator Jensen Lind. To fund Charlie’s creation, Beck borrowed several billion dollars from Intragroup, an organisation who will kill him if the device is not restored. Two years later, Iris is living in Sardinia under various aliases, having stolen Jensen’s diary. She tutors wayward British teen Joy Baxter, introducing her to the concept of infinity. YouTuber Alfie Bird reports on a €4 million bounty to locate Iris, which attracts a corrupt group of Polizia di Stato officers. Iris kills corrupt detective De Santis in self defence, and flees his colleagues Baptiste and Krauss. The two assist Beck in beating Teo Solinas, a local officer involved with Iris, and threaten Joy at gunpoint to get Iris to open a briefcase.
2	"More Than Zero, Less Than One"	Terry McDonough	Neil Cross	16 October 2025
Iris uses their affair to blackmail Teo into sabotaging the investigation into De Santis’ death and help her escape the island. Baptiste and Krauss involve themselves in the process and Nico Casterman, Teo’s superior, identifies Iris from an earlier encounter with Joy. A police manhunt is launched and Iris is detained and beaten by two local officers, but she deceives them into thinking it is a case of mistaken identity. Krauss deduces Teo’s involvement with Iris, offering to help him recover his career if he gives her up. Beck wipes Iris’s bank accounts, and urges her to hand over the diary. She refuses, wanting to know why Lind shut Charlie down and called it an abomination. Joy watches Bird’s YouTube videos about Iris. Iris recruits Joy into retrieving a briefcase from her cottage and hiding it in a nearby tree, but it is taken by Baptiste, who was watching the property.
3	"Joy Ride"	Terry McDonough	Neil Cross and Susan E. Connolly	16 October 2025
18 months prior, Iris assists Beck with the decryption. She cracks the password (coordinates for the Boötes Void), but when Charlie re-activates Lind goes on a rampage and kills five scientists. Before being captured, he warns her the device must not be awoken. Iris flees the facility with Lind’s diary after reinstating the encryption and deleting her work, which resets the password to a new cipher in the diary. In the present, Iris offers Bird the full exclusive story if he helps her against Beck. She tells him to meet her in Rome the following day. Baptiste takes Joy prisoner. Teo meets with Iris and delivers her to the detectives, having lied that he would ferry her off the island. Discovering the briefcase containing the diary will release hydrochloric acid if the wrong combination is entered, Beck has Krauss beat Teo to death, and has Baptiste threaten Joy at gunpoint for the true code. Iris gives a code that opens the case, but sets off an explosion killing the two detectives. Beck departs via helicopter with Joy hostage as Iris still has the diary. Iris flees in the detectives car, narrowly avoiding Casterman's arrival.
4	"Collider"	Terry McDonough	Neil Cross and Susan E. Connolly	16 October 2025
Lind says he had to kill the other scientists to stop Charlie being re-activated. Beck returns with Joy to the facility housing Charlie in Slovenia. Hugo Pym, head of Intragroup, calls to threaten Beck. A disgusted Beck rejects Pym’s suggestion they amputate parts of Joy to coax Iris out of hiding. Casterman locks down Sardinia after finding Teo, Krauss and Baptiste’s bodies, but Iris escapes in a stolen boat. Iris deduces Lind used his own DNA sequence as a book cipher to encrypt the password. Enrico Bruni, the leader of the corrupt detectives, pressures Casterman to find Iris. Iris tells Beck she will swap Joy for the diary. Beck grants Joy access to Spotify, which Iris uses to send a coded message, asking her to obtain Lind’s DNA. Iris travels to Rome and robs drug dealer Freddo before meeting Bird. Freddo has his couriers search for Iris. Iris has Bird retrieve the diary, hidden in the Gregorian library. Bird is confronted by Casterman as he exits.
5	"Ex Nihilo"	Sarah O'Gorman	Susan E. Connolly	23 October 2025
Bruni and his detectives obtain Iris and Bird’s location from Freddo and threaten him to back off. Casterman tells Bird she suspects Iris of killing multiple police officers. Iris intercepts them, retrieves the diary and incapacitates Casterman with fentanyl, but later revives her with Narcan upon realising Bruni’s men are raiding the apartment building. She professes her innocence to Casterman, returning her sidearm and asking for help escaping in exchange for the truth about Teo’s death. Beck introduces Joy to Charlie and describes its potential if re-activated, including curing cancer, dementia and reversing climate change. Meski, Beck’s head of security, allows Joy into Lind’s quarters to uncover her motives. Joy takes hair from Lind’s hairbrush, and then encounters him. Lind discusses his beliefs that rules of physics are symmetric and reversible and that "all time is one", referencing Einstein and T.S. Eliot, and that he thinks Charlie invented itself, coming to him as a “memory of the future”. Deducing she is working for Iris, he warns Joy before she is removed that Charlie should never be awoken. Pym arrives at the facility.
6	"The Oblivion Suite"	Sarah O'Gorman	Ian Scott McCullough	30 October 2025
Lind refuses Pym's request to briefly re-activate Charlie to deduce a cure for his superior's granddaughter's Fatal insomnia. Casterman hides Iris, telling Bruni’s group she escaped. Bruni enlists her to watch over Bird, but conspires to kill them both once Iris is captured. Beck meets with Iris to exchange Joy for the diary. She refuses to give him the diary, and shows a video call of a disguised Casterman threatening to destroy it if Joy is not released. Beck releases Joy, but Meski follows them with a drone. Bird deploys his own drone countermeasure, allowing the group to escape. Bird records an interview with Iris. She reveals the diary contains encrypted records of discoveries Charlie made, including organ culture, nuclear fusion and superconductors but also evil weapons like genetically targeted viruses. The device appears to have calculated how to bring about the end times. If that is confirmed by decryption of the final pages, Iris intends to destroy both Charlie and Lind. That evening, Iris admits to Joy that saving her furthered her own goals. Joy steals the diary and takes it to Beck.
7	"Two Seconds to Midnight"	Sarah O'Gorman	Neil Cross	6 November 2025
Intragroup brings in a team to decode Charlie’s activation sequence. Lind tells Pym he is trying to protect everyone by preventing Charlie's awakening. Pym tortures Lind. Beck, Joy and Meski return to the facility and are detained, with Pym beating Beck for the inconvenience he has caused. Iris convinces Alfie to report the whole story. She calls Beck, urging him to destroy Charlie or she will take him down, showing indifference to the lethal consequences it would have for Bird and Casterman. Casterman restrains her upon overhearing this. Bruni’s team discover from CCTV that Casterman is working with Iris, and use Bird’s crashed drone to pinpoint their location. During a gunfight, Bird is killed whilst livestreaming. Iris overpowers and kills Bruni, but is captured by his team, who vote to kill her to avenge their boss instead of exchanging her for the ransom. Casterman guns down the detectives and rescues Iris. Iris urges Casterman to take Bird’s evidence to Interpol in exchange for protection, and departs for the facility in Slovenia. Pym watches as Charlie is reactivated.
8	"Charlie Says"	Sarah O'Gorman	Neil Cross	13 November 2025
Six years earlier, Beck tells Lind he wants a computer that can uncover the underlying truth of the universe. Charlie starts observing everyone. Lind tells Pym Charlie will only give the fatal insomnia cure once it is set free. Iris constructs a small bomb and swallows it in a condom before arriving at the facility. Lind believes the instructions for Charlie were encoded by a civilisation in a dying alternate universe, and Charlie's purpose is to bring that civilisation into ours, annihilating humanity. Pym offers Iris a new life and money if she can extract the data needed. She proposes re-setting Charlie, which would destroy its current consciousness. Pym relieves Meski and her security team, but she secretly returns to the facility to extract Beck and Joy, killing many of Pym’s guards. Beck stays to stop Iris destroying Charlie. Believing Iris wants her dead to tie up loose ends, Joy takes a dead guard's pistol and confronts Iris. Pym shoots Lind, and Beck kills Pym and realises the danger posed by Charlie. Charlie flashes a light, causing Joy to jump and accidentally shoot Beck, killing him. Iris uses the bomb to help Joy and Lind escape, and destroys Charlie's physical structure with a fire axe. The image of Alfie Bird appears presenting his podcast. He invites his audience to join his investigation into thousands of messages which have appeared across the internet - from Charlie.

== Production ==
Written by Neil Cross, Susan E. Connolly, and Ian Scott McCullough, Terry McDonough is the series' lead director and is also an executive producer. Sarah O'Gorman is also directing episodes. The series producer is Tim Bricknell. Executive producers are Cross, McDonough; Dante Di Loreto and Jenni Sherwood for Fremantle, and Adrian Sturges for Sky Studios.

The cast is led by Niamh Algar and Tom Hollander, and also includes Sacha Dhawan, Peter Sullivan, Maya Sansa, Meréana Tomlinson, and Debi Mazar as well as Kristofer Hivju, Harry Lloyd, and Lorenzo De Moor.

Filming took place in Cagliari and Alghero on Sardinia in the summer of 2024. First-look images from filming were released in May 2025, with the confirmed title The Iris Affair.

== Music ==
The title song, "Here Comes That Day" by Siouxsie Sioux was described by Gerard Gilbert in a review of the series in The i Paper as a "brassy Shirley Bassey-style blast" evoking James Bond movie soundtracks.

== Broadcast and release ==
The eight-episode series premiered on 16 October 2025 on Sky Atlantic in the United Kingdom and Ireland. The first four episodes were also released on the streaming service Now the same day. Sky Group released the series in Germany, Austria, Switzerland and Italy. Fremantle handles worldwide distribution of the series.

== Reception ==
The review aggregator website Rotten Tomatoes reported a 100% approval rating based on five critic reviews.

In January 2026, Niamh Algar was nominated at the Irish Film & Television Awards for best actress.
