= Hidden Assets =

Television series

- Developed by: Peter McKenna
- Directed by: Thaddeus O'Sullivan; Kadir Ferati Balci; Mia Mullarkey
- Starring: Nora-Jane Noone; Aaron Monaghan; Cathy Belton; Simone Kirby; Wouter Hendrickx; Kwaku Fortune; Gilles de Schryver; Charlie Carrick; Jane Brennan; Angeline Ball; Iñigo Gastesi; Charlotte Timmers; Catherine Walker; Dónall Ó Héalaí; Frank Laverty; Tony Doyle; Rebecca O'Mara; Steve Wall; Peter Coonan; Sophie Jo Wasson; Karine Vanasse; Michael Ironside
- Composer: Michel Corriveau
- Countries of origin: Ireland, Belgium, Canada
- No. of seasons: 3
- No. of episodes: 18

Production
- Executive producers: Siobhán Bourke, James Mitchell, Stephen Greenberg, Peter De Maegd, Shane Murphy, Tom Hameeuw Peter McKenna, Donna Walsh, Andrew Byrne, David Crean, Catherine Mackin, Bea Tammer, Nicky Davies Williams
- Producers: Siobhán Bourke, Kathryn Lennon, Anna-Sue Greenberg, Catherine O'Flaherty
- Cinematography: Richard Kendrick, Diego Dezuttere, Hyun De Grande, Dries Delputte, Tim Fleming, Simon Walsh
- Editors: David Di Francesco, Chantal Lussier, Thomas Pooters, Thijs Van Nuffel

Original release
- Network: RTÉ One
- Release: May 10, 2022 – present

Related
- Acceptable Risk

Hidden Assets is an Irish-Belgian-Canadian crime drama developed by Peter McKenna and directed by Thaddeus O'Sullivan, Kadir Ferati Balci and Mia Mullarkey. The series premiered on RTÉ One on November 7, 2021. The second season premiered on RTÉ on September 3, 2023. The third season premiered on RTÉ on November 9, 2025. The series is a spinoff of Acceptable Risk.

== Premise ==
The first series is set in present day Shannon, County Clare, Ireland, its Free Zone and airport, and the port of Antwerp, Belgium. It focuses on the Irish Criminal Assets Bureau (CAB) and the Belgian Counter Terrorism Unit (CTU).

The second series of Hidden Assets is also set between Antwerp and County Clare (Limerick, specifically). Following Angeline Ball's departure from the cast, Nora-Jane Noone joined as DS Clare Wallace.

The third series is set in Dublin and Bilbao where CAB joins forces with Ertzaintza detectives.

== Cast ==
=== Main ===
Actor	Character	Season		
Actor	Character	1	2	3
Nora-Jane Noone	Detective Sergeant Claire Wallace		Main	Main
Aaron Monaghan	Detective Garda/Sergeant Sean Prendergast	Main	Main	Main
Cathy Belton	Bureau Forensics Officer Norah Dillon	Main	Main	Main
Simone Kirby	Bibi Melnick	Main	Main	
Wouter Hendrickx	Chief Inspector Christian De Jong	Main	Main	
Kwaku Fortune	Bureau Forensics Officer Josh Ola	Main	Main	
Gilles De Schryver	Inspector Vincent Thijs	Main	Main	
Charlie Carrick	James Melnick	Main	Main	
Jane Brennan	Eileen Gately	Main	Main	
Angeline Ball	Detective Sergeant Emer Berry	Main		
Iñigo Gastesi	Inspector Jon Beitia			Main
Charlotte Timmers	Inspector Lore Velasco			Main
Catherine Walker	Dr. Niamh Bennett			Main
Dónall Ó Héalaí	Detective Garda Liam Boylan			Main
Frank Laverty	Anthony Pearse			Main
Tony Doyle	Brian O'Neill			Main
Rebecca O'Mara	Dr. Alice Heaslip			Main
Steve Wall	Chief Superintendent Martin Dunlop			Main
Peter Coonan	Fionn Brannigan	Main		
Sophie Jo Wasson	Siobhán Brannigan	Main		
Karine Vanasse	Frances Swann		Main	
Michael Ironside	Richard Melnick	Main		
Maya Albert	Mila Albert	Recurring	Main	
Bert Kettermans	Aubrey Cline	Recurring	Main	
Steve Geerts	Viktor Maes	Recurring	Main	
Eva Kamanda	Passent Hussein		Main	

=== Recurring ===
- Caroline Stas as DSU Leader
- Rover de Hauwere (season 1) and Davin McElherron (season 2) as Arthur Melnick
- Birgit Herteleer as Belgian News Anchor
- Dr. Marianne Baert as Ariane Van Vliet
- Sari-Lynn Kerkhofs as Chessa
- Burak Balci as Zev (season 1)
- Matthieu Sys as David (season 1)
- Natali Broods as Isobel Delvey (season 2)
- Teli Jalloh as CTU Julien (season 2)
- Natalya Strutsenko as Tedora Babic (season 2)

== Episodes ==
Season	Episodes	Originally released	
Season	Episodes	First released	Last released
1	6	November 7, 2021	December 12, 2021
2	6	September 3, 2023	October 8, 2023
3	6	November 9, 2025	December 14, 2025

=== Season 1 ===
List of Hidden Assets Season 1 episodes
No. overall	No. in season	Directed by	Written by	Original release date
1	1	Thaddeus O'Sullivan	Peter McKenna	November 7, 2021
2	2	Thaddeus O'Sullivan	Peter McKenna	November 14, 2021
3	3	Thaddeus O'Sullivan	Morna Regan	November 21, 2021
4	4	Kadir Ferati Balci	Morna Regan	November 28, 2021
5	5	Kadir Ferati Balci	Morna Regan	December 5, 2021
6	6	Kadir Ferati Balci	Peter McKenna	December 12, 2021

=== Season 2 ===
List of Hidden Assets Season 2 episodes
No. overall	No. in season	Directed by	Written by	Original release date
7	1	Thaddeus O'Sullivan	Mary Fox & Marty Thornton	September 3, 2023
8	2	Thaddeus O'Sullivan	Mary Fox and Marty Thornton	September 10, 2023
9	3	Thaddeus O'Sullivan	Sinéad Collopy	September 17, 2023
10	4	Kadir Ferati Balci	Susan E. Connolly	September 24, 2023
11	5	Kadir Ferati Balci	Mary Fox & Marty Thornton	October 1, 2023
12	6	Kadir Ferati Balci	Peter McKenna	October 8, 2023

=== Season 3 ===
List of Hidden Assets Season 3 episodes
No. overall	No. in season	Directed by	Written by	Original release date
13	1	Kadir Ferati Balci	Mary Fox & Marty Thornton	November 9, 2025
14	2	Kadir Ferati Balci	Susan E. Connolly	November 16, 2025
15	3	Kadir Ferati Balci	Cara Loftus	November 23, 2025
16	4	Mia Mullarkey	Mary Fox & Marty Thornton	November 30, 2025
17	5	Mia Mullarkey	Susan E. Connolly	December 7, 2025
18	6	Kadir Ferati Balci	Peter McKenna	December 14, 2025

== Production ==
The series is a spinoff of the crime drama Acceptable Risk. The series was commissioned by RTÉ and Acorn TV in association with Screen Ireland, Screen Flanders and SuperChannel, and is financed through tax incentives from Ireland (Section 481), Belgium (BNPPFFF) and Canada (Québec production tax services).

Hidden Assets is produced by Irish production company Saffron Moon and Canada’s Facet4 Media and co-produced with Belgian producer Potemkino. The series was developed by Peter McKenna.

The first season was written by Peter McKenna and Morna Regan. The second season was written by Peter McKenna, Mary Fox & Marty Thornton, Sinéad Collopy, and Susan E. Connolly. The third season was written by Peter McKenna, Mary Fox & Marty Thornton, Susan E. Connolly, and Cara Loftus.

== Reception ==
=== Ratings ===
The first series' finale was watched by 458,000 viewers in Ireland.

=== Critical reception ===
Irish Examiner's Esther N. McCarthy felt that the first series "aimed high and delivered for audiences". Pat Stacey of the Irish Independent considered it to be an improvement over Acceptable Risk. Rachel Sigee of i compared the series' handling of sociopolitical themes and international setting to Nordic noir.

The Guardian called the second series of Hidden Assets "superbly dark and twisted" ahead of its transmission on BBC Four on 2 December 2023.

Reviewing the third series, the Irish Mail on Sunday said "Hidden Assets reveals itself as Sunday's best!".

== Sales ==
UK-based distributor DCD Rights confirms new deals for the second season of international crime drama Hidden Assets. Sales include the BBC (UK), SBS (Australia), Stan (Australia), Acorn TV (New Zealand), TV4 (Sweden) and TV2 (Norway). Season 3 sales include Streamz (Belgium) and EITB (Spain).

== Awards ==
Award nominations for Hidden Assets
Year	Award	Category	Nominee(s)	Result	Ref.
2022	Irish Film & Television Academy	Drama Series	Hidden Assets Season 1	Nominated	
2022	Irish Film & Television Academy	Actress Lead Role Television	Angeline Ball	Nominated	
2022	Irish Film & Television Academy	Actress Supporting Role Television	Cathy Belton	Nominated	
2022	Irish Film & Television Academy	Actress Supporting Role Television	Simone Kirby	Nominated	
2022	Irish Film & Television Academy	Actor Supporting Role Television	Peter Coonan	Nominated	
2022	Irish Film & Television Academy	Director Television Series	Thaddeus O'Sullivan	Nominated	
2022	Irish Film & Television Academy	Script Writer Television	Peter McKenna	Nominated	
2022	Irish Film & Television Academy	Script Writer Television	Morna Regan	Nominated	
2022	RTS Ireland Television Awards	Drama	Hidden Assets	Nominated	
2024	Irish Film & Television Academy	Best Drama	Hidden Assets Series 2	Nominated	
2024	Irish Film & Television Academy	Best Script	Peter McKenna	Nominated	
2024	Irish Film & Television Academy	Best Supporting Actress	Cathy Belton	Nominated	
2024	Irish Film & Television Academy	Best Supporting Actor	Aaron Monaghan	Nominated	
2024	Irish Film & Television Academy	Rising Star	Kwaku Fortune	Nominated	
2026	Irish Film & Television Academy	Director Drama	Mia Mullarkey	Nominated	
2026	Irish Film & Television Academy	Script Drama	Cara Loftus	Nominated	
2026	Irish Film & Television Academy	Lead Actor - Drama	Aaron Monaghan	Nominated	
2026	Irish Film & Television Academy	Lead Actress - Drama	Nora-Jane Noone	Nominated	
2026	Irish Film & Television Academy	Supporting Actor - Drama	Dónall Ó Héalaí	Nominated	
2026	Irish Film & Television Academy	Supporting Actress - Drama	Cathy Belton	Nominated	
