= Lord Loss =

2005 book by Darren Shan

- First edition cover
- Author: Darren Shan
- Cover artist: Melvyn Grant
- Language: English
- Series: The Demonata
- Release number: 1
- Genre: Horror
- Publisher: HarperCollins
- Publication date: 12 June 2005 (UK); 5 July 2005 (USA
- Publication place: United Kingdom
- Media type: Print (Paperback)
- Pages: 224
- OCLC: 57465664
- Followed by: Demon Thief

Lord Loss is the first novel in The Demonata series written by best-selling teenage horror author Darren Shan. It was originally published in the UK on 6 June 2005. Soon after, it appeared in Japan and America, where Shan's previous series, The Saga of Darren Shan, had sold millions. The novel is set in Ireland and is told in present tense first person through Grubbs Grady, a child whose family are all chess players.

== Plot ==
Grubitsch "Grubbs" Grady, the younger child of chess-obsessed parents, grows increasingly uneasy with the recent strange, nervous behavior of his parents and sister. One night, he finds the mutilated bodies of his family and encounters Lord Loss, a gruesome human-like demon who sets his two familiars, Vein and Artery, on Grubbs. Although Grubbs manages to escape, he is deeply traumatized and is placed in a mental institute. He refuses to respond to treatment until he is visited by his father's younger brother, Dervish Grady, who tells Grubbs that he knows demons exist and convinces Grubbs to finally accept help.

After Grubbs recovers, he lives with the rather eccentric Dervish in his mansion near the village of Carcery Vale. Dervish explains to Grubbs that using magic is possible as Grubbs himself used magic to flee from Lord Loss and his minions. As Grubbs begins to settle down, he meets and befriends Bill-E Spleen, another orphan who visits Dervish often to learn magic. Bill-E tells Grubbs of his belief that Dervish may actually be his father, given how close they were before then, but tells Grubbs to keep it a secret from him, which he agrees. Later, when exploring the cellar, Grubbs comes across a book on demonology, and opens to a page containing an illustration of Lord Loss, which seemingly comes to life and calls to him. Grubbs immediately closes the book and runs out of the cellar.

Time passes, and later, Grubbs and Bill-E discover animal corpses being left in the nearby forest. They also notice Dervish collecting them and disposing of the remains. Fearing for Grubbs’ safety, Bill-E eventually shares his theory that Dervish is a werewolf, as many Gradys were prone to lycanthropy, which manifests itself at puberty. However, Bill-E is later revealed to be the real werewolf, though he doesn't know it himself. Dervish confirms to Grubbs that the Gradys are indeed cursed, only that it has been going on for centuries. Dervish later explains that Bill-E is Grubbs' half-brother from one of his father's affairs. The only way to cure him is by winning three out of five simultaneous chess games with the powerfully magical demon master Lord Loss while another person battles his familiars. Neither one is permitted to fail. This is also revealed to be the reason his family was killed, when his sister Gret also succumbed to the family curse. Meera Flame, a friend of Dervish, who is knocked out while trying to restrain a transformed Bill-E, was supposed to help battle the demons. Dervish convinces an extremely reluctant Grubbs, who is still haunted by nightmares, to take her place. While confronting Lord Loss, Dervish is constantly distracted from his chess match as Grubbs is unable to fight off the two familiars. Dervish finally uses magic to save Grubbs, but Lord Loss sees this as breaking the rules of the game and is about to let his familiars kill Dervish, Grubbs, and Bill-E. However, Dervish is able to convince Lord Loss to let Grubbs finish the chess game, while he battles the familiars. A terrified Grubbs then makes a bad game worse. Then Grubbs realizes that Lord Loss is feeding on his despair and then decides to play with an aloof attitude. This throws Lord Loss' concentration, allowing Grubbs to win the game. Lord Loss then cures Bill-E, but someone must battle him in his realm. Grubbs offers to go, but Dervish refuses to let Grubbs fight and goes instead. Dervish leaves to the Demonata universe, leaving Grubbs behind with Bill-E. Grubbs lies to Bill-E, telling him that Dervish used a calming spell to try to cure his lycanthropy. Grubbs figures that it's better for Bill-E to believe that Dervish is his father, since his real father is dead. Fourteen months later Grubbs has been caring for Dervish in his zombie-like state, also dealing with the fear that he'll turn into a werewolf. One morning, Grubbs wakes up to find blood under his nails and hair in his teeth. Thinking that he has turned, he prepares to call the mysterious Lambs Dervish told him about, to kill him before he does any harm. As Grubbs reaches for the phone he hears someone call his name. Turning to look he sees Dervish, with his senses regained, holding a tin of paint and a woollen scarf. The book ends with Dervish saying, "The look on your face!"

== Reception ==
James Delingpole, writing in The Daily Telegraph described the book as dark but moral, "The scene in which the boy's father, mother and sister are disemboweled and shredded by the demon Lord Loss and his vile familiars Artery and Vein, must surely be the most jaw-droppingly grisly in children's literature.".
