= Wolf Island (novel) =

2008 novel by Darren Shan

- Original cover of Wolf Island. Grubbs in his half-werewolf half-human form.
- Author: Darren Shan
- Cover artist: Melvyn Grant
- Language: English
- Series: The Demonata
- Release number: 8
- Genre: Horror Fantasy Adventure
- Publisher: HarperCollins
- Publication date: 1 October 2008
- English publication date: June 2008
- Media type: Hardback
- ISBN: 0-00-726040-7
- OCLC: 233262794
- Preceded by: Death's Shadow
- Followed by: Dark Calling

Wolf Island is the eighth installment in Darren Shan's The Demonata series. It was released in Ireland and the UK on September 22, 2008, and in the US in May 2009. The book is narrated by Grubbs parallel to the events of Death's Shadow.

== Plot summary ==
The book starts with Grubbs fighting a demon alongside Beranabus and Kernel in the Demonata universe. After subduing and torturing the demon they are fighting, they question it about the Shadow, but learn nothing. Later, they meet up with Shark, Meera, Bec and Dervish. They discover that the Lambs were responsible for the attack on the Grady's home in Carcery Vale and it is decided that Grubbs should go after them to find out more.

Shark assembles a team of soldiers he names the "Dirty Dozen". One of them is Timas Brauss, a computer expert, who finds the Lamb's Headquarters. Upon their arrival, they find a man named Antoine Horwitzer in charge, in place of the missing Prae Athim. Antoine explains that Prae stole around six to seven hundred werewolves from their breeding facility. They learn, through Timas' efforts, that Prae took all the werewolves to "Wolf Island" and Antoine accompanies them there.

On the island, they find Prae a prisoner. It emerges that Antoine and Juni Swan were behind the assault. Juni Swan arrives shortly after and they are attacked. They manage to flee and attempt to escape on the helicopter they arrived in but it is destroyed. They try to escape from the released werewolves through a window, but are attacked before they can open one. Shark is left behind in the subsequent fight. Grubbs, Meera, Prae and Timas try to escape by sea since the werewolves cannot swim but ultimately find themselves surrounded. Grubbs becomes a werewolf and kills the leader of the pack, replacing him and assuming control of the werewolves. He makes the werewolves go back to attack Juni.

Grubbs fights Juni but is eventually overpowered. Just as he is about to be killed, Juni has a vision. She says that Grubbs is tapping into great magic and that the world is being destroyed, informing him "the demons will not destroy the world, Grubbs Grady - you will." With that, she leaves. Grubbs later finds Antoine trying to escape by boat. Grubbs agrees not to kill Antoine if he calls his Lambs off their attack and has them escort Bec and Dervish to safety. Once this is done, Antoine asks Grubbs to keep his end of the bargain. Grubbs confirms he would not kill Antoine, "but that doesn't mean the pack won't". Antoine is savagely killed. On the way back to the docks, they see a man lying on his back in a boat. This is revealed to be a severely injured Shark, who fought and killed the werewolves he was left to fight with.

When Grubbs gets back home, he finds Dervish has decided to stay and die instead of going to the Demonata world. A window opens and Grubbs, Bec, Dervish, and Kirilli prepare to fight.
