= Redemption (TV series) =

Irish television series

- Genre: Crime drama
- Created by: Sean Cook
- Directed by: John Hayes
- Countries of origin: Ireland; United Kingdom
- Original language: English
- No. of series: 1
- No. of episodes: 6

Production
- Executive producers: Catherine Oldfield; Patrick Schweitzer
- Producers: John Wallace; Ingrid Goodwin
- Production companies: Tall Story Pictures; Metropolitan Films

Original release
- Network: Virgin Media One
- Release: 18 April – 23 May 2022

Redemption is a six-part crime drama television series created by Sean Cook. A co-commission between Virgin Media Television and ITV, the series premiered on Virgin Media One in Ireland on 18 April 2022.

== Cast ==
=== Main ===
- Paula Malcomson as Colette Cunningham
- Abby Fitz as Cara Lockley
- Scott Graham as Ross Corby
- Thaddea Graham as Siobhán Wilson
- Ian Lloyd Anderson as Niall Kilduff
- Evan O'Connor as Liam Lockley
- Keith McErlean as Patrick Fannon
- Moe Dunford as Eoin Molony
- Siobhán McSweeney as Jane Connolly

=== Supporting ===
- Patrick Martins as Luke Byrne
- Sean Hughes as Kevin Cheng
- Jade Jordan as Debbie Gleeson
- Seán Duggan as Sean Kinsella
- Rachel O'Byrne as Stacey Lockley

== Episodes ==
List of Redemption episodes
| No. | Written by | Original release date |
|---|---|---|
| 1 | Sean Cook | April 18, 2022 |
Liverpool-based DI Colette Cunningham uproots to Dublin when she learns that her estranged daughter, Stacey, has taken her own life. Once there, Colette meets her two teenage grandchildren for the first time. Despite having never known of their existence she’s their named guardian. Determined to do right by her daughter in her death, Colette joins the local Dublin Police and cares for the kids. However, not everything about Stacey’s life is what it seems, Colette sets out to uncover the truth.
| 2 | Sean Cook | April 25, 2022 |
Confused about her latest discovery, Colette heads to the hospital where Stacey worked to speak to those who knew her well in the hope of understanding her daughter better. As she pieces together an image of Stacey and her life, something doesn’t quite add up about her daughter’s final days. At home, Colette’s grandparenting skills are tested as she adjusts to living with Liam and Cara.
| 3 | Noel Farragher | May 2, 2022 |
A visit from Organised Crime confirms Colette’s suspicions that there’s more to Stacey’s death than suicide and that Stacey’s boyfriend is more than the charming man he appears to be. Colette starts to piece together fragments from Stacey’s home and work that point to one person knowing more than they are letting on. After successfully closing a case, Colette joins her team at the pub for a drink. At home, however, Colette rocks the boat with Cara and has to tread carefully to make amends.
| 4 | Susan E. Connolly | May 9, 2022 |
After a charged confrontation, Colette’s all but convinced Stacey was murdered but is resolved that she needs firm evidence before she can involve any of her colleagues. Meanwhile, Siobhán and Colette’s case develops from a simple theft to something far more sinister that’s not so easy to resolve. At home, things appear to be improving until Liam shares a secret that blindsides Colette. To make matters worse, someone from Stacey’s past reappears and threatens Colette’s new life in Dublin.
| 5 | Susan E. Connolly | May 16, 2022 |
Colette works a case that brings her into contact with someone who knew Stacey, opening up a new lead. Looking into Stacey’s last calls, Colette uncovers an unknown number that belongs to someone much closer to the family than she expected. What was Stacey doing on that final night and where was she going in her final hours? Meanwhile, Colette struggles to adapt to the addition of Liam and Cara’s father as he bids for guardianship.
| 6 | Sean Cook | May 23, 2022 |
A suspect firmly on her radar, Colette is determined to find out the truth. With the help of Patrick and Siobhán, Colette finally gets evidence to corroborate what she’s always suspected: Stacey didn’t kill herself. However, things take an unexpected turn when she discovers the house ransacked and Cara missing. Colette must think quickly as time runs out to uncover the truth behind Stacey’s death and save Cara.

== Production ==
Created by Sean Cook, Redemption is a co-production between ITV's Tall Story Pictures and the Irish company Metropolitan Films in association with Screen Ireland. Executive producers include Catherine Oldfield and Patrick Schweitzer with John Wallace and Ingrid Goodwin as producers and John Hayes as director. Noel Farragher and Susan E. Connolly completed the writers' room.

Cast members such as Paula Malcomson, Moe Dunford, Siobhán McSweeney, Keith McErlean, Thaddea Graham, and Ian Lloyd Anderson were announced in April 2021, by which point principal photography was underway.

== Reception ==
=== Critical response ===
The What's on TV and radio tonight column in The Times described Malcomson as "excellent in the lead role", and that the show itself "settles into something smarter and more brooding."

Writing for The Evening Standard, Kate Rice gave the series 3 out of 5 stars, highlighting that Paula Malcomson "...makes a strong mark as the show’s lead, showcasing Cunningham’s cutthroat nature – as well as her grief – particularly in the show’s opening, where she switches between the two seamlessly". She criticised the occasionally slow pace, concluding that "While it is by no means revolutionary, it’s a worthwhile contribution to the much loved genre."

=== Accolades ===
| Award | Date of ceremony | Category | Recipients | Result | Ref. |
|---|---|---|---|---|---|
| RTS Republic of Ireland Awards | 28 March 2023 | Drámaíocht / Drama | Redemption | Won | |
