= The Demonata =

Series of books which deals with the world of demons

- Lord Loss, book 1 of the series
- Lord Loss (2005); Demon Thief (2005); Slawter (2006); Bec (2006); Blood Beast (2007); Demon Apocalypse (2007); Death's Shadow (2008); Wolf Island (2008); Dark Calling (2009); Hell's Heroes (2009)
- Author: Darren Shan
- Language: English
- Genre: Horror and fantasy
- Publisher: HarperCollins
- Published: 2005–2010

The Demonata is a young adult horror/fantasy series by author Darren Shan.

== Works ==
=== Publishing order ===
Cover illustration copyright Melvyn Grant

1. Lord Loss – 6 June 2005 (5 October 2005 in the US)
2. Demon Thief – 5 October 2005 (7 June 2006 in the US)
3. Slawter – 1 June 2006 (1 November 2006 in the US)
4. Bec – 2 October 2006 (1 May 2007 in the US)
5. Blood Beast – June, 2007 (1 November 2007 in the US)
6. Demon Apocalypse – October, 2007 (1 May 2008 in the US)
7. Death's Shadow – May, 2008 (1 November 2008 in the US)
8. Wolf Island – 1 October 2008 (1 May 2009 in the US)
9. Dark Calling – 1 May 2009 (October 2009 in US)
10. Hell's Heroes – 1 October 2009 (May 2010 in the US)

=== Storyline order ===
- Bec (Between 351 AD and 400 AD, during ancient Ireland's conversion from Paganism to Christianity, about 1600 years before Demon Thief)
- Demon Thief (Mid 1970s, about 30 years before Lord Loss)
- Lord Loss (Early 21st century)
- Slawter (Fourteen months after the end of Lord Loss)
- Blood Beast (About a year after Slawter)
- Demon Apocalypse (Directly following Blood Beast)
- Death's Shadow (Six months after Demon Apocalypse and roughly parallel to Wolf Island and Dark Calling)
- Wolf Island (Roughly parallel to Dark Calling)
- Dark Calling (Roughly parallel to Wolf Island)
- Hell's Heroes (Directly following Dark Calling)

=== Narrators ===
The narrator of each book in the Demonata series shifts between the three protagonists of the series; Grubbs Grady, Kernel Fleck and Bec MacConn.

Name of Book	Narrator
Lord Loss	Grubbs
Demon Thief	Kernel
Slawter	Grubbs
Bec	Bec
Blood Beast	Grubbs
Demon Apocalypse	Grubbs
Death's Shadow	Bec
Wolf Island	Grubbs
Dark Calling	Kernel
Hell's Heroes	Grubbs

== Plot ==
The series centers around three protagonists from separate periods of time—Grubbs lives in the present day, Kernel in the 1970s, and Bec in around 450AD. The books detail their fight against the demon master Lord Loss, his many demon familiars, and Shadow, who promises to destroy the human universe. Together with The Disciples, the main characters attempt to thwart the Demonata from destroying the world.

== Characters ==
=== Grady-MacGrigor family tree ===
The MacGrigor Clan
Struan	Aednat	Aideen
Bec MacConn	Many Generations
The Garadex Family
Bartholomew Garadex	Urszula Garadex	The Moore Family
Forty Years Later	Abraham Garadex	Many Generations
Juni Swan/ Nadia Moore
Davey McKay	The Grady Family
Five Children	Caspar Grady	Augustine Grady
Unknown Grady
Emily Spleen	Cal Grady	Sharon	Dervish Grady
Billy "Bill-E" Spleen	Gretelda "Gret" Grady	Grubitsch "Grubbs" Grady

=== Overview ===
Character		The Demonata									
Character		Book 1	Book 2	Book 3	Book 4	Book 5	Book 6	Book 7	Book 8	Book 9	Book 10
Main characters
Lord Loss		Main	Main	Main	Recurring	Guest	Guest	Voice	Mentioned	Guest	Main
Dervish Grady		Main	Guest	Main		Main	Main	Main	Main	Main	Guest
Grubbs Grady	The Trigger	Main		Main		Main	Main	Guest	Main	Main	Main
Bill-E Spleen		Main		Main		Main	Main	Mentioned	Mentioned	Mentioned	Mentioned
Artery	Art Fleck	Main	Main	Guest	Guest	Guest	Guest			Old One	
Sharmila Mukherji		Guest	Main	Guest			Guest	Recurring			
Nadia Moore	Juni Swan		Main	Main		Main	Main	Main	Main	Main	Mentioned
Beranabus	Bran		Main	Mentioned	Main	Guest	Main	Main	Mentioned	Mentioned	Mentioned
Kernel Fleck	The Eye		Main	Mentioned			Main	Recurring	Recurring	Main	Main
Davida Haym				Main							
Bec MacConn	The Memory				Main	Guest	Guest	Main	Recurring	Main	Main
Drust					Main						Skeleton
Recurring characters
Meera Flame		Recurring		Recurring		Recurring	Recurring	Recurring	Recurring	Recurring	
Shark			Guest	Recurring			Recurring	Recurring	Recurring	Recurring	Recurring
Cadaver			Recurring	Guest				Recurring			
Raz Warlo			Recurring							Old One	Old One
Loch Gossel				Recurring		Recurring	Mentioned	Mentioned			
Prae Athim				Guest				Recurring			Recurring
The Old Ones			Mentioned		Recurring	Mentioned	Mentioned	Recurring	Recurring	Recurring	Recurring
Kirilli Kovacs								Recurring	Recurring	Recurring	Recurring
Timas Brauss									Recurring	Recurring	Recurring
