= Hell's Heroes (novel) =

2009 book by Darren Shan

- Author: Darren Shan
- Cover artist: Melvyn Grant
- Language: English
- Series: The Demonata
- Release number: 10
- Genre: Horror, Fantasy novel
- Publisher: HarperCollins
- Publication date: 1 October 2009
- Publication place: Ireland
- Media type: Print (hardback & paperback)
- ISBN: 0-00-726035-0
- OCLC: 464590172
- Preceded by: Dark Calling

Hell's Heroes is the tenth and final book in Darren Shan's The Demonata series.

Darren Shan wished that nothing about this book, not even the title, be known to the public until late December 2008. This was the second time this has happened with any of the Darren Shan books, possibly initiated by the recent popularity increase in the author's works.

It is published in the United Kingdom and the United States.

== Plot ==
Grubbs and Dervish are talking in the cave. Dervish is dying and only has a short amount time left to live, but he and Grubbs take it in their normal humorous stride. Grubbs reflects on how Dervish has always been there for him and begins to recall memories of his time with his uncle. Dervish dies during Grubbs' reflections. Grubbs takes his body into the open air and begins the slow, painful process of digging his uncle's grave.

Nearly a month later Grubbs is fighting a snakelike demon that killed the granny Disciple. He kills it then finishes up the battle. He has been fighting wave after wave of demons that are breaking through all over the globe. He has gathered another group of werewolves but is slowly being worn down. He goes to see Kernel and Kirilli in the hospital. He has been having a reoccurring dream of Bec in Lord Loss's kingdom, and in one of his torture chambers he sees Bo Kooniart. Bec then gets Lord Loss to take them into Earth's first chessboard. Time seems to freeze as Grubbs keeps on peering into the chess room. They return and it seems that Bec has made a deal with Lord Loss, and this assures Grubbs that Bec has betrayed them. For as Bec goes back to her room she hugs Lord Loss after he has agreed to something. Something to do with lodestones. Therefore, they decide to destroy as many lodestones as they can before Bec can get to them, and go to the only lodestone that they know the location of, the one at Carcery Vale. Grubbs, Kernel, Kirilli and two werewolves Curly and Moe with the help of the government and military of the world are quickly there by plane, which the werewolves hate and helicopter which they love. When they get there, they walk around Dervish's old mansion for a while, before going to the cave. They remove the dirt and go into the tunnel and the second cave with the lodestone after Kernel tells Grubbs this might be exactly what Bec and Lord Loss want them to do.

They carry on and Grubbs destroys the lodestone by throwing it at the cave wall and grinding the other pieces together and into the ground until nothing of it remains. Then footsteps approach and Shark and Timas Brauss reveal themselves. They discuss everything that has happened, Shark confronts Grubbs and forces him to confront his fears. He apologizes to Kernel and tells him he will let him go after he opens a window to Bec, regardless of whether he wants to come with them or not.

Grubbs works for hours to open the window, Shark, Timas, the werewolves and Kirilli all go through, and Kernel is lead into it by Grubbs. Going to the Demonata Universe makes him happy for the first time in a long while. The Kah-Gash questions Grubbs before he goes through as well. Kernel sets to work on his eyes while the others relax, then Curly starts acting strangely and Bec's face comes out of her body. Bec tries to convince Grubbs it is over and that he should choose to live like she has. When he refuses, she laughs and warns him about the incoming attack. A window opens up and Lord Loss's familiars pour out as Bec's face disintegrates. They start fighting the demons then four, four-metre tall demons come through and start throwing their fellows into the lake before bowing to it, allowing the lake to kill them. Grubbs realizes that this was the reason why they were sent there to wake the lake, the real, demon master of this realm. Who up to this point was starved of food. They back away but as it splits up, they are out of time. Grubbs takes Kernel and jumps through the window towards Lord Loss's realm followed by the others. Here Grubbs convinces Kernel to help him free the prisoners after he has remade his eyes. They do so, setting all the prisoners free and sending them through a portal to Earth, killing those too weak to move through as an act of mercy. He then gives Kirilli, Timas and Shark the chance to go back but they refuse, he then goads Kernel saying he can't leave now and he doesn't.

They confront Lord Loss and Bec and start fighting the pair of them but Grubbs quickly realizes they are fully outmatched. Moe, Shark and Kirilli all fight Lord Loss but he makes short work of them. Lord Loss tells Bec to kill one of them but she can't. When Grubbs and Kernel try to reason with her, she tells them all those she was loyal to are gone, she gets the original board and the walls melt to reveal thousands of humans. Their souls are trapped inside the board and Bec melts the board killing all of them. When the last human falls the board is still glowing and Death comes from it. Its tendrils caress Bec and one of them enters her throat as she calls for Grubbs to come to her. Kernel has opened a window and Lord Loss, stunned from Grubbs's last attack can't stop him. Shark and Kirilli flee through the window followed by a reluctant Timas. Grubbs follows after the Kah-Gash tells him they could be a quartet with Death, Grubbs refuses to go through and Kernel destroys the window.

Kernel realizes that now that Death is back on the scene there is no hope for the Earth, so he decides to go back to the Ark to save a small part of the life from this universe. Kirilli has the idea to get the Old Creatures to help protect the Earth, so Grubbs agrees to the plan. Kernel can't open a window from Earth so they go back to the Demonata Universe and after passing through several worlds, Kernel starts working on a window to Atlantis, on the barren asteroid world. As he opens the window, he tells the others he can only take Grubbs with him for they will be going through space and he only has power to protect one person from it. They travel through the space tunnel of light and arrive in Atlantis. Grubbs begins to make the request to Raz, but, having read his mind, Raz states that the Old Creatures will not help. He freeze Grubbs promising to send him back to die alongside the other earthlings. But then another window opens and a Deathified-Bec comes through, explaining that she can go anywhere Kernel has been, and that she knows where the 'Ark' is. Raz loses hope and attacks her, they fight and she kills Raz, but this drains some of Death's power, and she regains enough control of herself to shout at Kernel and Grubs to get away before Death kills them and can reunite the Kah-Gash. They do as she suggests and return to the others, but Grubbs is now suspicious that Bec is not as evil and demonic as they thought.

They resign themselves to the end of the world, but decide that they should try to kill as many demons as they can before the world falls. When they go back to Earth, the world is being besieged by demons, who have managed to open several tunnels, in the six weeks that have passed on earth since they left. They decide that they might as well try to close the tunnel and forestall the annihilation of Earth. They meet back-up with Prae and a new set of werewolves and all fight with new vigor (even Kernel, who didn't like the fighting, has decided that there is nothing to lose anymore), they make it to the tunnel entrance and destroy the lodestone, causing the demons to be sucked back to their realm, alongside some unfortunate werewolves and humans. They go to a tunnel on the opposite end of the earth next, but they quickly realize it is futile and they have everybody pulled out. Grubbs decides they should wait for the tunnels that threaten the whole world and throw everything they got at it, and leave the ones that can only cover a few hundred kilometers alone.

After four days Kernel sees the lights going wild, the sign that a tunnel of great power is opening. A team fronted by Grubbs, Kernel, Kirilli, Shark and Timas go to the edge of a cliff where the tunnel is (this most likely is the place that Bec and Beranabus travel to in the fourth book and where we see the Old Creatures for the first time). Grubbs uses the power coming through the forming tunnel to re-enact Moses and he parts the sea, and then creates steps down on the cliffside to the cave and tunnel. Timas stays on top, and he and Shark inform the others that they have arranged for nuclear devices all over the world to be detonated if the team fails, therefore causing the humans to be killed instantly, instead of waiting for the demons to torture them.

On the way down the Kah-Gash informs Grubbs that it never wanted to manipulate them, and isn't working for the demons or humans. This means that Grubbs can use the ancient weapon as much as he wants, and it will do whatever he wants. When they go in, they find the tunnel entrance and Lord Loss and Deathified-Bec waiting for them. While the tunnel is opening, a fight breaks out, and Grubbs manages to catch Lord Loss by surprise using his and Kernel's parts of the Kah-Gash, taking him out of action for a while. The pair begins to seal the tunnel again, but then Bec steps in. She diverts Kernel and Grubbs's power into herself, giving the masters in the tunnel the opportunity to burst through. This is when Grubbs realizes that Lord Loss, who he has been afraid of since his parents and sister were slaughtered, was only one of the lesser demon masters, and that the ones that are pouring through at the moment are many times stronger than him.

In the following fight Kirilli is decapitated, and Shark is melted along with most of the other werewolves and soldiers, by the far stronger demon masters. In a last attempt Kernel and Grubbs grab Bec, after being unable to beat her up, they do this to try to blow her up in the tunnel to close it, but when they get to her and direct all their energy into her, she just feeds it back to them increasing it, letting the weapon rise in power. Bec begins to control the weapon, and in a last attempt to stop her, Grubbs cuts the flow of energy to her, but then she winks at him. This catches him by surprise, and he quickly makes the decision that she wasn't trying to fool him, so instead of cutting the power to Bec, he increases it, directing all the power around them into her. The Kah-Gash becomes fully active, and starts a similar process as it did in the sixth book, but at a much grander scale. Both the Demonata a human universes begin to tear apart into the Kah-Gash, while Bec intently watches everything Bec then tells them to go to the Crux (the point the big bang occurred, where the two universes expanded apart), and reveals that she is following a plan devised by Beranabus. When they arrive at the Crux, they shatter into sixty-four pieces and merge the original universe back together, with the Kah-Gash once again forming the boundary. Time and entropy no longer exist, causing the Demonata to celebrate in their white universes, the remaining Old Creatures in their black universes. Death returns to a mindless force. However, the Kah-Gash is now controlled by the triumvirate of Bec, Kernel and Grubbs.

The trio form bodies for themselves, and discuss what will happen now. Bec explains that because she is the Kah-Gash's memory, she memorized everything as they destroyed it, the history of every atom in every universe. Thanks to this the three of them can rebuild the human universe exactly as it was, with a simulation of time to complete it. Grubbs points that now that they have restored the old universe, the Demonata will inevitably destroy it again, the Kah-Gash will split, and everything will repeat itself. Kernel realizes what the next part of the plan was. As they now hold the universe together, they hold everything inside together, including the demons. The Kah-Gash can now protect itself from violation by destroying Demonkind. Bec persuades them out of destroying every demon, and Kernel shows them a clip of the past where Beranabus tells Grubbs that most of the demons are not worth bothering about. This sways Grubbs into the others’ way of thinking. In a sudden sweep, the trio instantly and painlessly unmake every Demon Master, and any with enough power to cross the boundaries between universes, though Grubbs does enjoy the killing. They however do leave one to be the last.

They reform their bodies and meet the last master: Lord Loss. He is waiting for them on his throne outside of his castle of webs. Lord Loss questions them about killing the lesser demon masters, especially those who were similar to them in stature. When Grubbs tells him he took the permission to do this, Lord Loss tells him it is very demonic of him to do so and his conscience will catch up with him across eternity. As they go to kill him, Bec stops them, revealing that she had made a deal with Lord Loss. Grubbs doesn't care and wants to kill him regardless, Kernel however does want to know about the deal, when Grubbs tries to kill him, he finds resistance. Bec explains that as they share the Kah-Gash, any fighting between them could destroy it anew. Begrudgingly, Grubbs listens

In the chess board, Bec told Lord Loss about Bran's plan. Lord Loss admits he didn't even think she could convince them to spare the familiars, nevermind himself. Lord Loss reveals he doesn't actually care about his fellow demon masters calling them a vile, beastly lot. She goes on to state that her burning the board was a charade in order to trick both Death and the Demonata, as with Death inside her, it could not see her inner thoughts, as consciousness was still new to it. Lord Loss then reveals he protected Bec and made sure they came together, which was a calculated risk. Grubbs wonders why and Lord Loss explains that he likes humans, their sorrows, suffering and games they invent. Bec promised his life in return and a promotion. Lord Loss then reveals he isn't that powerful and chose to focus on earth while other demon masters terrorized galaxies. He postulates that maybe the Kah-Gash drew him to earth. He explains his desire to be the lord of all Demonata now, and without competition his shadow and horror might cover the entire universe, a feat beyond any Demon Master before. Grubbs starts to protest this but Bec says they need him, for the universe requires a force of evil and she doesn't like the idea of being it. Grubbs says they could use another demon, but Bec explains she made a deal and he promised not to overstep his bounds, leave the Old Creatures alone and only cross when authorized and without leaving footholds. Bec then states they have to make sure that everything happens as it did before, every demon crossing has to be recreated to recreate the universe and the lives within it, and only when they reach the present they can stop the crossings. Lord Loss then claims that he is the reason everything unfolded as it did and Grubbs must accept him. Grubbs relents thinking Lord Loss might be part of an uber plan. Grubbs warns him not to step out of line, Lord Loss rebukes him, saying he already has everything he ever wanted.

The trio choose a random black universe to rebuild the human cosmos, with its own version of time, making sure that everything is as it was the first time. Bec provides the memories, Kernel manipulates the hidden strings of the universe and Grubbs supplies the power to do it. The Old Creatures sense what they are doing and they can feel their approval. It will be difficult however they will have to focus for billions of years. Souls are the only thing they don't need to worry about, for they can feel a large force at work there, a force they do not name. Grubbs states that he will feel tempted to interfere but he must fight for they don't want to rob individuals of the right of determination. They are architects of the universe and nothing more. Grubbs thinks that they could start over but they must ensure life evolves so they get the ball rolling, but they might stop a bit earlier as he increase this amount of time, Bec tells him that it is dangerous thinking and they should not interfere. Grubbs points out they need to change things anyway, or the replicated trio would assemble the Kah-Gash and trip the universe apart once more. The Kah-Gash pieces have to be removed, and Death must remain a mindless force. Grubbs tells them they need to make all kinds of changes and Kernel agrees. Bec asks them where they would draw the line, when Grubbs is born or when she is born. Grubbs states if they stop at Bec, all those he cares about might never be born. As they fantasize about all they could do, Bec questions whether they have the right to alter the universe to suit their own desires. Kernel responds they should discuss further, and Bec agrees. Grubbs is happy to do so, as they have billions of years before it becomes relevant.

Grubbs tells them to get started but Bec and Kernel leave it up to him to begin, assuring him it will work out. He thinks about what to say before starting the job of starting the Big Bang. He utters a slightly changed biblical quote saying: "In the beginning Grubbs created the Heavens and the Earth and everything was dark. Then Grubbs said 'Let there be light'."

And there was light.

Coolio!
