= Demon Apocalypse =

Book by Darren Shan

- Original Demon Apocalypse cover, depicting Lord Loss
- Author: Darren Shan
- Cover artist: Melvyn Grant
- Language: English
- Series: The Demonata
- Release number: 6
- Genre: Horror, Fantasy novel
- Publisher: HarperCollins
- Publication date: 1 October 2007
- Publication place: Ireland
- Media type: Print (hardback & paperback)
- OCLC: 174500183
- Preceded by: Blood Beast
- Followed by: Death's Shadow

Demon Apocalypse is the sixth book in Darren Shan's The Demonata series. Darren Shan released the title of the book September 29, 2007 at the Baeth Festival of Children's Literature.

Darren Shan wished that nothing about this book, not even the title, be known to the public until late September, close to the book's release. This is the first time this has happened with any of the Darren Shan books, possibly initiated by the recent popularity increase in the author's works.

It is published in the United Kingdom and the United States.

== Plot ==
Picking up where Blood Beast left off, Grubbs is on a plane in a dire situation face-to-face with Lord Loss and Juni Swan who has just been revealed to be one of his higher ranked familiars. Beranabus appears, a powerful magician and the one the disciples follow. The two jump from the plane, and fly to his cave. Once there, Beranabus and Kernel take Grubbs with them to fight a demon in one of the Demonata worlds. Grubbs panics and flees, and is stuck in Beranabus' home for seven weeks alone. Once Beranabus and Kernel return from demon hunting, they all discover that the Tunnel that Bec had sealed 1600 years ago has been opened, and the Demonata are invading in force. Enlisting the help of the Disciples, Grubbs, Kernel, and Beranabus set out to reseal the tunnel and remove the Demonata from Earth at the same time.

After arriving at the tunnel, Kernel's eyes are gouged out by Spine, a familiar of lord loss and Grubbs sees the heads of all his loved ones held by demons, barring Bill-E. The spirit of Bec appears and tells Beranabus that sealing the tunnel will not remove the demons like it did last time. In the chaos, the Kah-Gash, a mysterious weapon capable of destroying a whole universe, awakes in the trio, allowing them to use the demonata's Tunnel to go back in time to before it was opened. During battle between Beranabus' group and Lord Loss', it is revealed that Bill-E must be killed to prevent the opening of the tunnel, since he unwittingly sacrificed Loch to open the tunnel. Because Dervish is unable to kill his nephew, Grubbs is forced to painlessly kill Bill-E. This seals the tunnel, and also forces the retreat of a shadowy creature unlike any demon Grubbs has seen before. Bec, her essence trapped within Grubbs, fills Bill-E's body and reshapes it to match her old form. It is revealed that Bec's spirit has been trapped inside the cave for the past 1600 years, believed by Beranabus to be because she is part of the Kah-Gash, along with Grubbs and Kernel. Now knowing what is at stake, Grubbs leaves Dervish in the care of Bec and joins Beranabus and Kernel in their effort to stop more tunnels from being opened, and to find out the nature of the Shadow.
