= Darren O'Shaughnessy =

Irish novelist

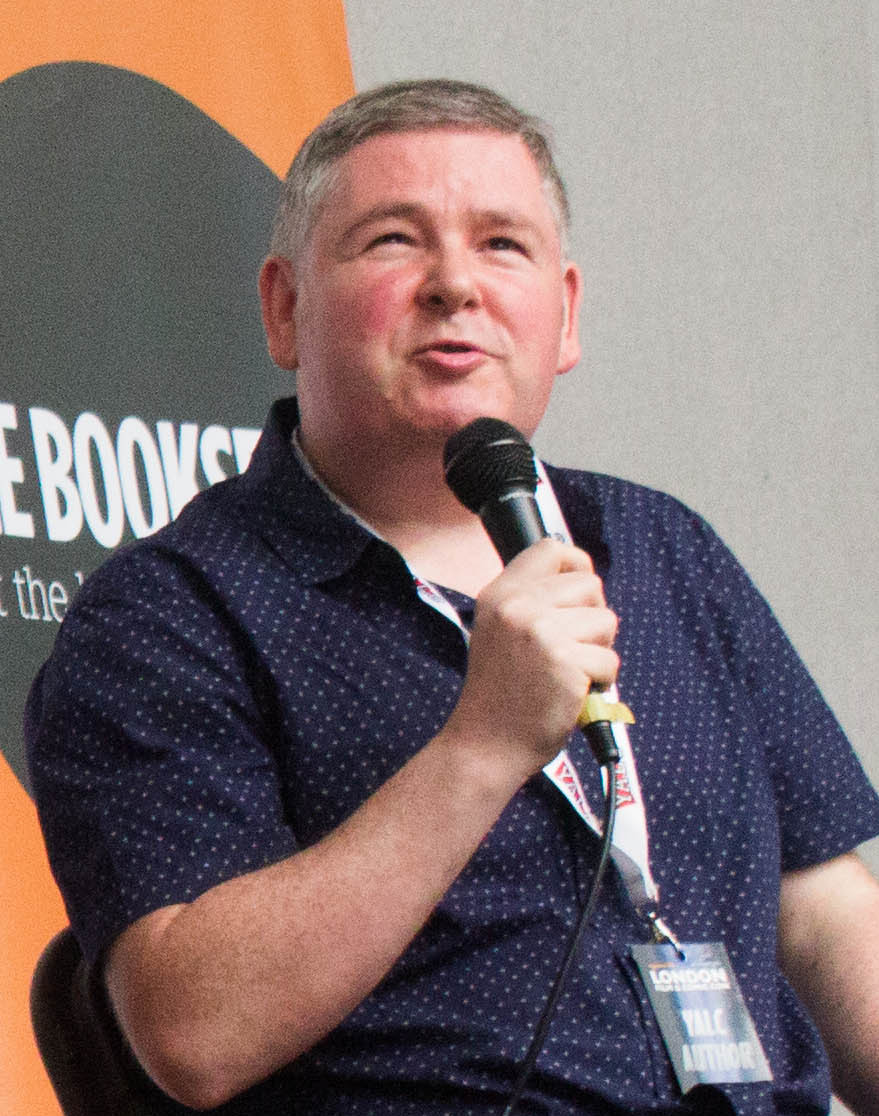
- O'Shaughnessy in 2016
- Born: Darren O'Shaughnessy; 2 July 1972 (age 54); Lambeth, London, England
- Education: Roehampton University
- Occupation: Author
- Spouse: Helen Basini
- Children: 2
- Writing career
- Pen name: Darren Shan, D. B. Shan, Darren Dash
- Language: English
- Period: 1999–present
- Genres: Horror, fantasy
- Notable works: The Saga of Darren Shan; The Demonata; The Thin Executioner; Zom-B; Archibald Lox
- Website: darrenshan.com

Darren O'Shaughnessy (/oʊˈʃɔːnəsi/; born 2 July 1972) is an Irish writer and novelist. He is best known for his young adult fiction series The Saga of Darren Shan, The Demonata, and Zom-B, published under the pseudonym Darren Shan. The former was adapted into a manga series from 2006 to 2009 as well as a live-action film in 2009, with a prequel series, The Saga of Larten Crepsley, being released from 2010 to 2012.

O'Shaughnessy has published other children's books as Darren Shan, including Koyasan, and The Thin Executioner. From 2020 to 2022, he self-published his latest young adult series Archibald Lox.

In the past, O'Shaughnessy has also published novels for adults under the Darren Shan pseudonym, but since 2014 he has released his work for older readers under the name of Darren Dash.

== Early life and education ==
O'Shaughnessy was born in St Thomas’ Hospital in London, opposite the Houses of Parliament. At the age of three, he started school at English Martyrs' near the Elephant and Castle where he lived. When he was six, he moved with his parents and younger brother, to Limerick in Ireland, where he has lived ever since.

He received his primary education in Askeaton, and attended secondary school at Copsewood College, Pallaskenry, graduating in 1989. He returned to London in 1990 to pursue a degree in Sociology and English from Roehampton Institute of Higher Education.

== Career ==
O'Shaughnessy bought his first typewriter when he was fourteen and wrote many short stories, comic scripts, and books that he never finished, many of which are unpublished. O'Shaughnessy claims that most of these stories will never be published. His first success came to him at age fifteen, when he was a runner-up in a TV script-writing competition for RTÉ in Ireland, with a dark comedy story entitled A Day in the Morgue.

After university, O'Shaughnessy worked in a TV cable company in Limerick for two years, before becoming a full-time writer at the age of 23. His breakthrough came with Ayuamarca, published in February 1999 by Orion Publishing Group under his full name. The sequel, Hell's Horizon, was published in February 2000. Ayuamarca was re-released in March 2008 under the title Procession of the Dead and the pen-name D.B. Shan. Hell's Horizon followed in March 2009, and the third in the trilogy, City of the Snakes in March 2010 (but this time under the name of Darren Shan). In January 2000, Shan released Cirque du Freak, the first book of The Saga of Darren Shan series in the United Kingdom and Ireland. The series was a huge global success and by 2021 his books were on sale in 40 countries, in 32 languages, and had sold thirty million copies worldwide.

O'Shaughnessy signed up with the Christopher Little Literary Agency in 1996 and they continued to represent him until Christopher Little's death in 2021. He is now represented by the Curtis Brown Agency.

== Personal life ==
O'Shaughnessy continues to live in Pallaskenry in Limerick, Ireland with his wife Helen Basini, a freelance university lecturer and global aid specialist. On 23 September 2014, the couple celebrated the birth of their first child, Dante, named after the famous Italian author Dante Alighieri. Shan and his wife Helen welcomed their second child, a daughter named Gaia, on 26 March 2019.

In 2025, Shan paid a tax bill of €2.14 million to the Revenue Commissioners after a financial audit revealed that he owed €1.4 million in unpaid taxes.

== Books ==
=== The Saga of Larten Crepsley ===
This is a four-book series covering 200 years in the life of Larten Crepsley, a vampire first introduced to readers in The Saga of Darren Shan.

1. Birth of a Killer. Released in the UK and US in October 2010.
2. Ocean of Blood. Released in UK and US in April 2011.
3. Palace of the Damned. Released in UK and US in September 2011.
4. Brothers to the Death. Released in UK and US in April/May 2012.

=== The Saga of Darren Shan (also known as the Cirque Du Freak series) ===
==== Vampire Blood Trilogy ====
1. Cirque Du Freak (ISBN 0316605107)
2. The Vampire's Assistant (0316905720/0316606847)
3. Tunnels of Blood (0316607630)

==== Vampire Rites Trilogy ====
1. Vampire Mountain (0316905747)
2. Trials of Death (0316603953)
3. The Vampire Prince (0316000973)

==== Vampire War Trilogy ====
1. Hunters of the Dusk (0316000981)
2. Allies of the Night (0007506422)
3. Killers of the Dawn (0316106542)

==== Vampire Destiny Trilogy ====
1. The Lake of Souls (0316016659)
2. Lord of the Shadows (0316156280)
3. Sons of Destiny (0316016640)

=== The Demonata ===
1. Lord Loss
2. Demon Thief
3. Slawter
4. Bec
5. Blood Beast
6. Demon Apocalypse
7. Death's Shadow
8. Wolf Island
9. Dark Calling
10. Hell's Heroes

=== The City Trilogy ===
The City Trilogy was written for adult readers and was originally released under O'Shaughnessy's own name. The third book was never published and the original versions are now out of print. They were published by Orion Publishing Group. However, in March 2008, Ayuamarca was re-published as Procession of the Dead (with substantial changes) by the Voyager imprint of HarperCollins (O'Shaughnessy's children's publisher). Hell's Horizon was released in March 2009 and City of the Snakes was released in March 2010. All three books are now also available in the US, as well as in several other countries.

1. Ayuamarca – Renamed Procession of the Dead – First published in the United Kingdom in February 1999 and later in Russia. Re-released in the UK in March 2008.
2. Hell's Horizon – Sequel to Ayuamarca. First published in the United Kingdom in February 2000. Re-released in March 2009.
3. City of the Snakes – Last book of The City Trilogy. It came out in the United Kingdom in March 2010.

=== Zom-B ===
On 12 October 2011, it was announced that O'Shaughnessy's next series for teenagers under the name of Darren Shan would focus on zombies, and that the title of the series was Zom-B. There were twelve books in total. The first book was released in the UK and USA in late September 2012, and the last book was released in April 2016.

1. Zom-B, released in the UK on 27 September 2012.
2. Zom-B Underground, released in the UK on 3 January 2013.
3. Zom-B City, released in the UK on 14 March 2013.
4. Zom-B Angels, released in the UK on 20 June 2013.
5. Zom-B Baby, released in the UK on 26 September 2013.
6. Zom-B Gladiator, released in the UK on 2 January 2014.
7. Zom-B Mission, released in the UK on 27 March 2014.
8. Zom-B Clans, released in the UK on 3 July 2014.
9. Zom-B Family, released in the UK on 25 September 2014.
10. Zom-B Bride, released in the UK on 24 February 2015.
11. Zom-B Fugitive, released in the UK in August 2015
12. Zom-B Goddess, released in the UK in April 2016

A short novel titled Zom-B Circus, set between Zom-B Gladiator and Zom-B Mission, was released on 27 April 2014. This is officially book 6.5 in the series chronology.

=== Archibald Lox ===
On 1 April 2020, O'Shaughnessy announced that he had silently released three books digitally due to the COVID-19 pandemic, making up the first volume of the Archibald Lox series. There were nine books released in total, making up three volumes when they were collected into omnibus editions.

==== Volume One ====
- Archibald Lox and the Bridge Between Worlds, released 1 April 2020.
- Archibald Lox and the Empress of Suanpan, released 1 April 2020.
- Archibald Lox and the Vote of Alignment, released 1 April 2020.
- Archibald Lox Volume One: The Missing Princess — collects the first three books in a single Volume, the way the story arc was originally written, released 31 October 2020.

==== Volume Two ====
- Archibald Lox and the Forgotten Crypt, released 1 July 2021.
- Archibald Lox and the Slides of Bon Repell, released 3 August 2021.
- Archibald Lox and the Rubicon Dictate, released 1 September 2021.
- Archibald Lox Volume Two: The Kidnapped Prince — collects books four through six in a single Volume, the way the story arc was originally written, released 1 November 2021.

==== Volume Three ====
- Archibald Lox and the Sinkhole to Hell released 31 May 2022.
- Archibald Lox and the Pick of Loxes, released 28 June 2022.
- Archibald Lox and the Legion of the Lost, released 26 July 2022.
- Archibald Lox Volume Three: The Exiled King — collects books seven through nine in a single Volume, the way the story arc was originally written, released 25 October 2022.

=== Stand-alone books ===
==== Koyasan ====
A short novel released for World Book Day in the UK in 2006. The paperback edition is out of print, but it is available in ebook format through Kindle on Amazon stores worldwide. It has also been translated and released in several other countries.

==== The Thin Executioner ====
A one-off novel, The Thin Executioner was released in April 2010. Inspired in part by The Adventures of Huckleberry Finn and based in a brutal, fantastical world, it details the perilous quest of Jebel, the thin and scrawny son of a respected executioner, to petition a fire god for invincibility, so that he can succeed his father. O'Shaughnessy has stated that this is his favourite out of all of the books he has written.

==== Lady of the Shades ====
Lady of the Shades was released in the UK and Ireland on 30 August 2012.

==== Hagurosan ====
Hagurosan is a short story originally released in a book collection called Kids Night In in the UK in 2003. O'Shaughnessy tweaked and slightly expanded it ten years later, and it was released as a book by the publishing group Barrington Stoke with illustrations by Zack McLaughlin.

=== Darren Dash ===
In 2014, O'Shaughnessy started publishing his books for adults under the name of "Darren Dash", so that they would not be confused with his children's books under the "Darren Shan" name. announcing that he would be publishing the rest of his adult books under this pen name in the future.

- The Evil and the Pure – released 2014.
- Sunburn – released 2015.
- An Other Place – released 2016.
- Midsummer's Bottom – released 2018.
- Molls Like it Hot – released 2019.
- Father of the Future – released 2023.

=== Online short spin-off stories ===
- "An Essay on Vampires" "by" Steve Leonard – book 1 tie-in story.
- "Annie's Diary" – book 1 tie-in story.
- "Tiny Terrors" – book 2 tie-in story.
- "Transylvania Trek" – a short story "written" by Sam Grest.
- "Shanta Claus" (only available at Christmas)
- "Lonely Lefty" – book 3 tie-in story.
- "Bride of Sam Grest" – another short story "written" by Sam Grest.
- "An Affair of the Night" – book 5 tie-in story (should be read just before or after book 5).

=== Short stories ===
1. "Hagurosan" – Originally written for Kids' Night In.
2. "Young Alan Moore" – Originally written for Alan Moore: Portrait of an Extraordinary Gentleman, a book written to celebrate the 50th birthday of Alan Moore.
3. "The Good Ship Tree" – Originally written for the Times Educational Supplement, and accepted.
4. "Life's a Beach" – Originally written for the Times Educational Supplement, but rejected.
5. "Guyifesto—Who We Are" – Originally written for Guys Write For Guys Read. (Play on words of "manifesto")
6. The Saga of Darren Shan tie-in short stories – See above

=== Unpublished books ===
In July 2009, O'Shaughnessy revealed that he had written first drafts of 53 books in total. Most of those have now been published, although there are several which have yet to see the light of day, which he plans to release in the future, most probably under his Darren Dash umbrella. There are also a few that will very likely never be published. O'Shaughnessy has not revealed details of any of his unpublished books, with two exceptions — Mute Pursuit and The Cannibal King:

1. Mute Pursuit – A futuristic cross between The Terminator and Stephen King's The Dark Tower; this was Shan's first completed book at age seventeen.
1. The Cannibal King – This was originally going to be the 12th book of The Saga of Darren Shan – book 11 was originally meant to be much longer, including elements from the first half of what became Sons of Destiny. The Cannibal King was never published because it was originally part of the planned 24-book Saga. Shan had planned to write 18—24 books for The Saga, with half of them taking place in the future wasteworld shown in Book 10, The Lake of Souls. For reasons explained on his web site, Shan decided to end the series with Sons of Destiny, which was written and released instead of The Cannibal King. He never reveals anything that he wrote in this book, because there is a possibility that he might one day write a follow-up series to The Saga, which would take parts of this book as its starting point.

== Television and film ==
Universal Studios bought the film rights to the first three books of The Saga of Darren Shan and combined them to make a single film, Cirque du Freak: The Vampire's Assistant, released in the US on 23 October 2009. Lauren Shuler Donner produced the film and Paul Weitz directed. The original screenplay was written by Brian Helgeland but rewritten entirely by Paul Weitz.

In May 2019, Zom-B was optioned for a ten-part television series adaptation by London-based production company The Electric Shadow Company. In March 2020, it was announced that The Electric Shadow Company had partnered with Slam Films in developing the series. In March 2021, Susan E. Connolly was announced to be attached as the lead writer on the project, with The Electric Shadow Company releasing a teaser image depicting a blood-spattered B Smith opposite her best friend Vinyl to their website. On 15 January 2024, Darren Shan announced on his website that the project would not be moving forwards and that the option rights had reverted to him.
