= Melvyn Grant =

English artist and illustrator

Melvyn "Mel" Grant (born 1944) is an English artist and illustrator. Trained traditionally, he originally worked with oil paints, but in the late 1990s Grant switched to creating most of his work digitally with a digitizing tablet and the software Adobe Photoshop and Corel Painter. Mel now lives and works on the coast in the Southeast of England, although the bulk of his work is commissioned internationally.

Grant was born in London, England. Always interested in illustrated arts, he attended the Brassey School of Fine Art from the age of twelve before dropping out at the age of eighteen. After studying electronics and working in a variety of short-term jobs, including as a guitarist, Grant travelled throughout Europe to improve his painting style. Upon his return to England, he worked as an illustrator in various media, including animation. Soon he found a niche creating covers for books, mostly fantasy work, but also science fiction. He worked in various styles, ranging from cute children's artwork to dark and realistic adult images. Grant has produced illustrations for many books, including the Fighting Fantasy gamebooks FF 3: Deathtrap Dungeon, FF9: Shamutanti Hills, FF 11: Khare Cityport of Traps, and FF13: The Seven Serpents, Terry Pratchett's Where's My Cow?, The Demonata series by Darren Shan and the Bartimaeus Sequence (USA) by Jonathan Stroud.

He is also known for being one of the artists associated with Iron Maiden's mascot Eddie. He designed the album covers for Iron Maiden's Fear of the Dark, Virtual XI, Death on the Road, The Final Frontier and From Fear to Eternity, as well as the single "The Reincarnation of Benjamin Breeg", making him the only artist other than Derek Riggs and Mark Wilkinson to have been used to draw Eddie on more than one Iron Maiden album.

Grant designed a number of covers for video games, including titles from Psygnosis and their sub-publisher Psyclapse Baal, Ballistix, Anarchy and Captain Fizz Meets the Blaster-Trons.
