= T. J. Lynch =

T. J. Lynch (born 1964?) is a screenwriter residing in Los Angeles. He was born and raised in Billings, Montana, and received a Bachelor of Science degree from Montana State University in Film & Television Production in 1986. In 1999 he was awarded the highly coveted Nicholl Fellowships in Screenwriting by the Academy of Motion Picture Arts and Sciences for his screenplay The Beginning of Wisdom.

Lynch's credits include the screenplay for the film A Plumm Summer, which stars William Baldwin, Henry Winkler, Lisa Guerrero, with narration by Jeff Daniels.

Lynch is a citizen of both the United States and Canada.
