= Cirque du Freak: The Vampire's Assistant =

- Theatrical release poster
- Directed by: Paul Weitz
- Screenplay by: Paul Weitz; Brian Helgeland
- Based on: Vampire Blood by Darren Shan
- Produced by: Lauren Shuler Donner; Paul Weitz; Ewan Leslie; Andrew Miano
- Starring: John C. Reilly; Ken Watanabe; Josh Hutcherson; Chris Massoglia; Ray Stevenson; Patrick Fugit; Willem Dafoe; Salma Hayek
- Cinematography: J. Michael Muro
- Edited by: Leslie Jones
- Music by: Stephen Trask
- Production companies: Relativity Media; The Donners' Company; Depth of Field
- Distributed by: Universal Pictures
- Release date: October 23, 2009 (United States)
- Running time: 109 minutes
- Country: United States
- Language: English
- Budget: $40 million
- Box office: $39.2 million

Cirque du Freak: The Vampire's Assistant is a 2009 American vampire dark fantasy film directed by Paul Weitz and co-screenplay adapted with Brian Helgeland, loosely based on the Vampire Blood trilogy of the book series The Saga of Darren Shan by author Darren Shan. The first three books in the 12-part series—Cirque du Freak, The Vampire’s Assistant, and Tunnels of Blood—inspired the film. The film was released by Universal Pictures on October 23, 2009, received poor reviews and was a commercial failure by grossing $39.2 million against a $40 million budget.

== Plot ==
In an unnamed American town, teenagers Darren Shan and Steve Leonard (Darren's more rebellious best friend and classmate) sneak out at night to attend the Cirque du Freak freak show at a local theater. During the performance, Steve recognizes one of the troupe's members, Larten Crepsley, as Ver Hosten, a vampire who is over a hundred years old, prompting him to try to find Crepsley after the show. Meanwhile, Darren, fascinated by Crepsley's spider, Madam Octa, goes backstage and impulsively steals her but is forced to hide when Crepsley returns to his green room. Steve arrives, begging to be made into a vampire, but Crepsley refuses after tasting Steve's blood, which he says "tastes of evil." When Crepsley realizes that Madam Octa was stolen, Darren flees from the theater with Crepsley in pursuit. He escapes when the mysterious Mr. Tiny arrives in his limousine, accompanied by Murlough. The latter is unimpressed with Darren, dismissing him as a "bag of blood," but Tiny promises to stay in touch after dropping Darren off at his home.

The following day, Darren secretly brings Madam Octa to school, where she escapes. A struggle in a crowded hallway follows and Steve tries to kill the spider, but she bites him on the cheek, leaving him to succumb to her deadly venom in the hospital. Darren returns to the theater and begs Crepsley for help. Initially annoyed and contemptuous, Crepsley agrees on the condition that Darren becomes a half-vampire—and Crepsley's personal assistant. Darren agrees, only to flee while Crepsley administers the antidote to Steve. However, after nearly attacking his own sister out of vampiric bloodlust, Darren decides to leave with Crepsley, who uses magic to stage Darren's death of a fall from a roof.

After being buried in a cemetery, Crepsley digs up the grave to free Darren, but Murlough ambushes them. Crepsley fights him off, and the two go to the Cirque du Freak campgrounds, where Darren meets Evra Von, the snake boy, and Rebecca, the monkey girl. Meanwhile, Steve, contemplating suicide after losing his best friend, is stopped by Tiny, who offers him a chance to become a Vampaneze, a race of vampires who—unlike Crepsley and others—murder their victims to feed on their blood. Steve agrees, proceeding to kill high school history teacher Mr. Kersey with Murlough's help. Trying to instigate a confrontation between Steve and Darren, Tiny kidnaps Rebecca and Darren's family, leaving a flyer for the Cirque du Freak at Darren's former home.

At the theater, Crepsley and Murlough fight while Darren fights with Steve, but Darren's refusal to feed weakens him. Rebecca frees herself using her monkey tail and offers Darren a taste of her blood. After some hesitation, he accepts. Crepsley stabs Murlough, and with his dying words, Murlough declares that the truce between the two vampire clans has been broken. Tiny (who had been watching from the balcony via opera glasses) eventually separates Steve and Darren. Darren asks Steve to stay with him, but Steve refuses, saying, "I have my destiny, and you have yours." Steve then leaves with Tiny, who plans to groom him as a Vampaneze leader.

Crepsley returns Darren's family to their home, hypnotizing them so they'll forget what they've been through. Rebecca and Darren share a heartfelt kiss before returning to the campgrounds, where Crepsley gives Darren a coffin to sleep in, and Darren accepts his new life as a member of the Cirque du Freak.

== Cast ==
- Chris Massoglia as Darren Shan
- John C. Reilly as Larten Crepsley / Ver Hosten
- Josh Hutcherson as Steve "Leopard" Leonard
- Ray Stevenson as Murlough
- Salma Hayek as Madame Truska
- Patrick Fugit as Evra Von
- Jessica Carlson as Rebecca (Monkey Girl)
- Michael Cerveris as Desmond Tiny (Mr. Destiny)
- Willem Dafoe as Gavner Purl
- Ken Watanabe as Hibernius Tall
- Jane Krakowski as Corma Limbs
- Kristen Schaal as Gertha Teeth
- Orlando Jones as Alexander Ribs
- Frankie Faison as Rhamus Twobellies
- Morgan Saylor as Annie Shan
- Don McManus as Dermot Shan
- Colleen Camp as Angela Shan
- Patrick Breen as Mr. Kersey
- Jonathan Nosan as Hans Hands
- Tom Woodruff Jr. as The Wolfman
- Blake Nelson Boyd as Mr. Afraid of the Ground Man

== Production ==
Cirque du Freak: The Vampire's Assistant was filmed between February 19 and June 1, 2008, in New Orleans, Folsom, and Baton Rouge, Louisiana. Some of the characters required extensive prosthetics and makeup, which was led by Steve Koch, Brian Sipe, and Mark Garbarino. Prosthetics did not quite add the height needed on certain shots for the character of Mr. Tall, played by Academy Award-nominated Ken Watanabe. Although Watanabe is six feet tall, a body double was cast for some scenes to accentuate the abnormal height of the character Mr. Tall. Trevon Flores, a local basketball player who stands 6'10" tall and weighs 210 pounds, was used cast as the body double. Watanabe also used dialogue coaches Kathleen S. Dunn and Francie Brown in pre-production and production to further enhance his performance as the circus barker. Computer-generated imagery was also used to portray other fantasy elements.

John Marshall High School in Los Angeles was used to film some parts of the movie. Sophie B. Wright Charter School in New Orleans was also used to shoot scenes from the film. A portion was filmed on a set constructed within New Orleans City Park, approximately 1,000 feet off the side of the road, along Harrison Avenue.

Principal photography began on February 8, 2008, in New Orleans and concluded on June 3, 2008. The film was distributed by Universal Studios. In one of the manga additions of the saga, the director says that the character of Gavner Purl was a hint of the sequel he wanted to make.

=== Music ===
The score to The Vampire's Assistant was composed by Stephen Trask, marking his third feature-film with director Paul Weitz. The score was recorded with an 86-piece ensemble of the Hollywood Studio Symphony at the Newman Scoring Stage at 20th Century Fox. The movie also features the songs "Something Is Not Right with Me" by Cold War Kids, "Chelsea Dagger" by The Fratellis, and "Red Right Hand" by Nick Cave. The trailer features the songs Asleep From Day by The Chemical Brothers, Bliss by Syntax, and Superhero by Immediate Music.

For the Japanese dub, the film received its own theme song, "Can We Go Back", sung by Koda Kumi.

== Release ==
The film was originally set for release on January 15, 2010, but was moved to an earlier release date of October 23, 2009.

=== Critical reception ===
Review aggregation website Rotten Tomatoes assigns the film a rating of 37% based on 138 critics with an average rating of 4.87/10. The site's critical consensus reads "This overstuffed, scattershot vampire flick suffers from poor characterization and an unwieldy mix of scares and chuckles." On Metacritic, the film has a score of 43 out of 100, based on 25 reviews, indicating "mixed or average" reviews. Audiences polled by CinemaScore gave the film an average grade of "B" on an A+ to F scale.

=== Box office ===
The film opened in 2,754 theaters in the United States and made over $14 million, reaching #7 in the charts. In other countries, it made more than $25 million, giving it a worldwide box office total of more than $39 million. On DVD, sales in the United States made more than $5.5 million. The film's chart placings worldwide include reaching #1 in Ukraine, #2 in Hungary, #2 in Russia, #2 in the United Arab Emirates, #3 in Mexico, #3 in Portugal, #4 in Egypt, #4 in Venezuela, #5 in Belgium, #5 in Peru, #5 in Singapore, #5 in the United Kingdom, #6 in Lebanon, #6 in the Philippines, #7 in Bulgaria, #7 in Japan, #8 in Chile, #8 in Colombia, #8 in the Netherlands, #9 in Austria, #9 in Romania, #11 in Germany, #11 in Malaysia, #11 in New Zealand.

== Home media ==
The film debuted on DVD and Blu-ray Disc in Canada, the United Kingdom and United States at the end of February 2010. In Canada, by the end of its first week on sale and available to rent, it was #1 on the Rogers DVD bestselling chart, #2 on the Blockbuster Canada bestselling chart, and #6 on the rental charts of both. In the United States it was #2 on the Rentrak bestseller chart, and #6 on the Blockbuster, Home Media and IMDb rental charts. In the United Kingdom it reached #5 on the MyMovies bestsellers chart, and #6 on the Yahoo chart.

== Canceled sequels ==
In a Reddit AMA in March 2015, Darren Shan stated that three sequels to Cirque du Freak: The Vampire's Assistant had been abandoned by Universal prior to the film's failure, as well as expressing interest in a potential future reboot of the series.

== See also ==
- Vampire film
