= Rodney Liber =

American film producer

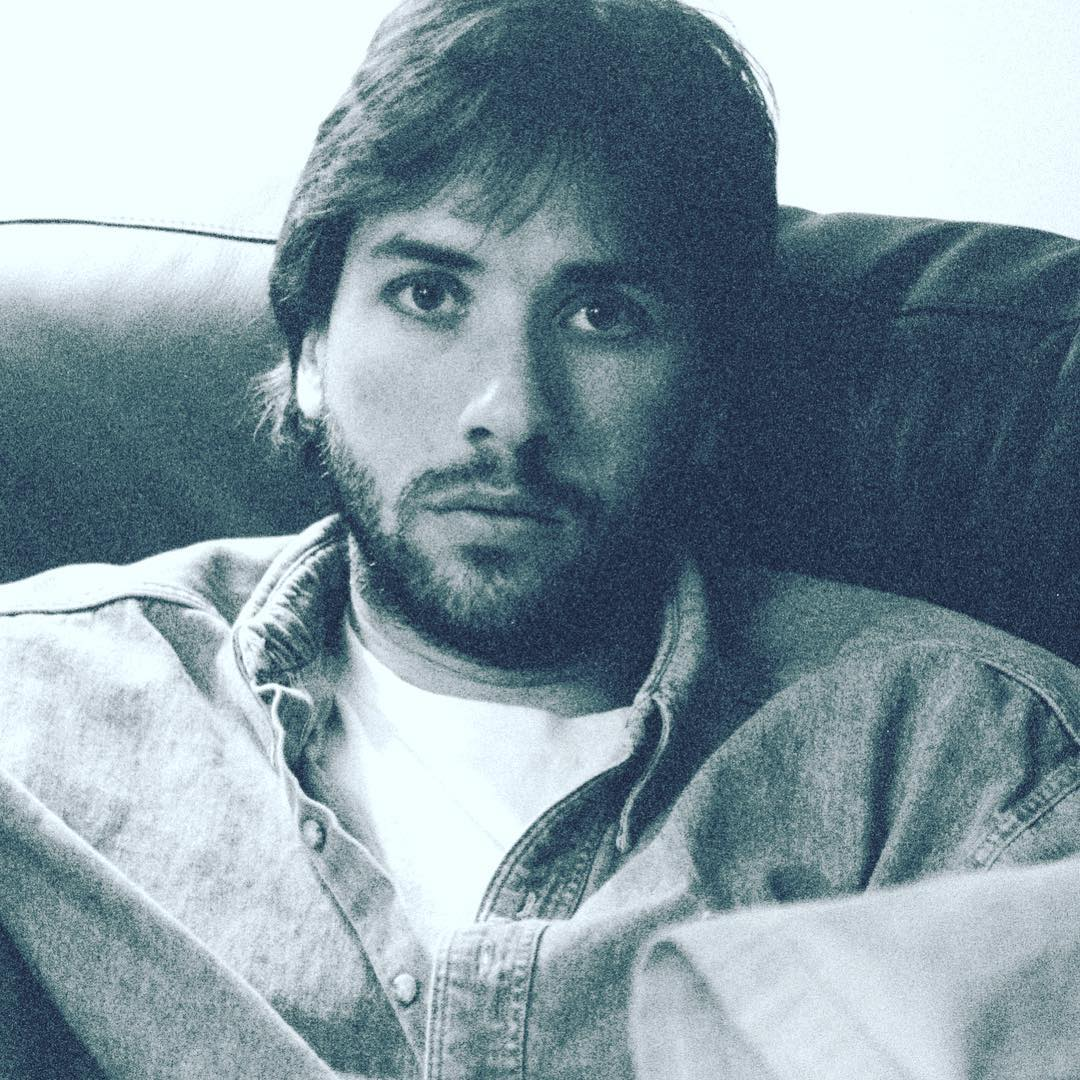
Rodney Liber on the set of Wild Things in 1997 Film Producer Rodney Liber in 2023

Rodney Liber is an American producer of theatrical release feature films. Over his twenty-year career, he has been involved in the production of over forty motion pictures. He produced two breakout hits, Big Momma's House starring Martin Lawrence and the sexual thriller, Wild Things. His last film, The Back-up Plan, stars Jennifer Lopez and Alex O'Loughlin. Previously, Liber worked on two fantasy adventure films, Dragonball Evolution and The Vampire's Assistant. He has been a frequent collaborator with Paul Weitz, on both In Good Company and American Dreamz.

While a vice president of production at 20th Century Fox, Liber supervised the production of classic comedies My Cousin Vinny and Hot Shots!. He also collaborated with Michael Mann on the Academy Award-winning movie, The Last of the Mohicans. Liber began his career working as a production assistant for fellow USC alum and Avatar producer Jon Landau.

Liber retired from producing films in 2010 to pursue his interest in real estate development and spend more time with family and friends.

== Personal life ==
Personal Life

Rodney Liber is married to Carla Liber. Together, they had two daughters, Ava and Samantha "Sami" Rose Liber. Sami died on August 8, 2024, at the age of 16, following an ATV accident during a family trip in Jackson, Wyoming. Sami was a vibrant and creative individual, deeply involved in her school community at Brentwood School, where she was set to become the yearbook editor and was an active member of the varsity cheer team. She had a profound love for art, music, and travel, leaving a lasting impact on those who knew her. In her honor, the Liber family founded The SAMI Foundation, supporting art, music, and imagination—passions Sami held dear.

Rodney is the son of Sol Liber (1923–2018), a resistance fighter in the Warsaw Ghetto Uprising of 1943 and a survivor of the Treblinka, Majdanek, and Buchenwald concentration camps. Sol Liber was among the first survivors to record their testimony with Steven Spielberg's Shoah Foundation.Liber is the son of Sol Liber (1923-2018), a resistance fighter in the Warsaw Ghetto Uprising of 1943 and a survivor of three concentration camps (Treblinka, Majdanek and Buchenwald.) Liber's father was one of the initial survivors to record their testimony with Steven Spielberg's Shoah Foundation.
