= Cirque du Freak =

2000 novel by Darren Shan

Cirque du Freak: A Living Nightmare
- First edition
- Author: Darren Shan
- Language: English
- Series: The Saga of Darren Shan
- Release number: 1
- Genre: Vampire Fiction
- Publisher: HarperCollins
- Publication date: January 2000
- Publication place: United Kingdom
- Media type: Print (Paperback)
- Pages: 192
- ISBN: 0-00-713900-4
- OCLC: 42745230
- Followed by: The Vampire's Assistant
- Website: https://darrenshan.com/

Cirque du Freak (also known as Cirque du Freak: A Living Nightmare) is the first of twelve novels in The Saga of Darren Shan by Darren Shan (real name Darren O'Shaugnessy), published in January 2000.

A feature film adaptation of the novel, directed by Paul Weitz and starring Chris Massoglia, John C. Reilly, Ken Watanabe, Salma Hayek, Josh Hutcherson and Willem Dafoe was released on 23 October 2009.
