= Cirque du Freak (manga) =

Japanese manga series

- First volume cover

ダレン・シャン (Daren Shan)
- Genre: Action; Dark fantasy; Supernatural
- Manga
- Written by: Darren Shan
- Illustrated by: Takahiro Arai
- Published by: Shogakukan
- English publisher: NA: Yen Press; UK: HarperCollins
- Imprint: Shōnen Sunday Comics
- Magazine: Weekly Shōnen Sunday
- Original run: August 9, 2006 – February 4, 2009
- Volumes: 12
- icon

Cirque du Freak (Japanese: ダレン・シャン, Hepburn: Daren Shan; lit. Darren Shan), known as The Saga of Darren Shan in Japan, is a Japanese manga series illustrated by Takahiro Arai and based on the book series The Saga of Darren Shan by author Darren Shan. The series was published in Shogakukan's Weekly Shōnen Sunday from August 2006 to February 2009, with its chapters compiled in twelve tankōbon volumes.

Cirque du Freak follows the story of Darren Shan, a young boy turned into a half-vampire. He joins Cirque du Freak with his guardian, Larten Crepsley, who had turned him into a half-vampire. They share an uneasy relationship, often becoming confused about each other's feelings and concerns, and Darren disliking Crepsley for taking away his human life. Steve Leonard, Darren's best friend while he was human, feels betrayed by Darren becoming a half-vampire and decides to become a vampire hunter in order to kill him.

Cirque du Freak was licensed for release in North America by Yen Press and in the United Kingdom by HarperCollins. Yen Press was able to acquire the license because of their sister company, Little, Brown and Company, which publishes the original novels. The Yen Press edition also contained an excerpt from the original book series.

The series has received relatively positive reviews from Western critics, with praise about its tone and story. The art and character designs were commended by critics, though noted as being awkward and over-the-top at times.

== Plot ==
After attending a showing of a freak show known as "Cirque du Freak", a boy named Darren Shan feels inclined to steal a large tarantula from the spider-tamer and revealed vampire, Larten Crepsley. He learns how to control her through telepathy, but while practicing with his best friend, Steve Leonard, the spider is startled and bites Steve's neck. Though the bite doesn't kill him, Steve is left paralyzed and Darren seeks out Crepsely for an antidote. Crepsley agrees to give it to him, on the condition that Darren becomes a vampire; Darren accepts, and is turned into a half-vampire, and Steve is healed. Immediately after, Darren flees from Crepsley, afraid to lose his lifestyle, friends, and family. However, Darren soon realizes that he cannot handle his new strength and thirst for blood and returns to Crepsley. They stage Darren's death, but before departing from the town, Darren encounters Steve, who vows to become a strong vampire hunter and kill him, feeling betrayed.

Despite craving human blood, Darren only drinks animal blood, and hates Crespley for changing him. He also feels alone, having no family or friends; he tries to blend in with other children, but his lack of control with his strength causes another boy to become injured. He confides to Crepsley about his situation and Crepsley decides to bring him to Cirque du Freak, knowing that Darren would be able to have friends and be himself when surrounded by other strange beings.

== Characters ==
Darren Shan
Darren Shan (ダレン・シャン, Daren Shan) is a young boy with an interest and love for spiders. Darren was drawn to the Cirque du Freak show because of the spider tamer, and was deeply amazed by the performance; enough so that he stole the spider. He is content living with his family but decides to become a half-vampire and join Larten Crepsley to save the life of his friend, as he feels it was his responsibility. Even after Steve vows to kill him one day after becoming a strong vampire hunter, Darren does not tell Crepsley about the threat in order to keep Steve safe, believing that he is still his best friend.
Steve Leonard
Steve Leonard (スティーブ・レナード, Sutību Renādo) is Darren's best friend who has a deep interest in vampires. He discovered that Larten was a vampire, and begged him to turn him into one. Larten tests his blood, and tells him that the blood is "bad", and that Steve is wicked and evil. Steve is the first to realize that Darren is no longer human, and leaves to become a strong vampire hunter able to kill Darren. Steve has remarked that his father no longer lives with him and that he feels his mother doesn't love him; he had felt that Darren was the only person he would truly miss if he became a vampire.
Larten Crepsley
Larten Crepsley (ラーテン・クレプスリー, Rāten Kurepusurī) is a vampire who works as a spider-tamer at Cirque du Freak and is Darren's guardian. He sees great potential in Darren and bloods him so that he can train him. Though Crepsley has acted coldly towards Darren and tests him under the guise of friendliness, he also shows concern for him and regrets changing him after seeing Darren's unhappiness. It was his idea to bring Darren to the Cirque, as well, to try and better Darren's situation. Despite being a vampire, Crepsley believes that they are not monsters until they kill humans, and refuses to turn someone who is evil into a vampire.

== Production ==
The manga series was based on a series of 12 books by author Darren Shan. Arai received a call from his editor in 2006, and was informed about a contest in which an artist would make a manga rendition of The Saga of Darren Shan. Shan would act as the "final judge", who decided out of the applicants who would be chosen. Arai "drew up a chapter or two", and in April 2006, he was accepted as the contest winner. Arai used a "touch" of his brother's version in a scene where Darren catches Cirque du Freak tickets. His brother also designed backgrounds and the characters Hans Hands, Alexander Ribs, and Gertha Teeth. Arai mentions that during the production of volume two was when he "truly learned the difference in depiction between a novel and a manga." He noted that manga "has a tendency" to be more "straightforward than a novel", due to its use of art. Altogether, Arai felt that depiction was "very fun", but still an "exasperating process". The Saga of Darren Shan was serialized weekly as well, so Arai had "to cram a hook and climax into an eighteen-page every single week". In order "to make the story fit", Arai was forced to remove scenes. Arai expressed that he would have liked to have spent more time on the Trials of Death and the Festival of the Undead during volume five, but was forced to condense the original novel to fit into one volume of manga.

To create background art, Arai gathered references from photographs taken during his childhood in Scotland. In addition, Darren's house is based on his Scotland home.

== Publication ==
Based on The Saga of Darren Shan by Darren Shan and illustrated by Takahiro Arai, Cirque du Freak was serialized in Shogakukan's shōnen manga magazine Weekly Shōnen Sunday from August 9, 2006, to February 4, 2009. (Note: It finished in the magazine's tenth issue of 2009 (cover date February 18), released on February 4 of that same year.) Shogakukan collected its chapters in 12 tankōbon volumes, released from November 17, 2006, to April 17, 2009.

At the 2008 San Diego Comic-Con, Yen Press announced that they had acquired rights to translate and publish the series in English. The first three volumes were set to be released to coincide with the film Cirque du Freak: The Vampire's Assistant. It was Yen Press' first title from Shogakukan, a "feat" in that Shogakukan is a co-owner of another manga publisher in North America, Viz Media. Little, Brown and Company, a sister company to Yen Press, helped Yen Press obtain the license because it publishes the original novel series. Yen Press' edition of the first volume was released on June 9, 2009, in North America under the name Cirque du Freak and contained an excerpt from the book series in the back of the volume. '

The Saga of Darren Shan has been licensed for release in the United Kingdom by HarperCollins under their HarperCollin's Children's Books imprint. HarperCollins released the first volume on May 28, 2009, with the series entitled as The Saga of Darren Shan. The Saga of Darren Shan was also licensed in France by Pika Édition and in Taiwan by Sharp Point Press.

== Reception ==
The first volume of The Saga of Darren Shan was listed on the American Library Association's "2010 Great Graphic Novels for Teens", a list compiling graphic novels that "meet the criteria of both good quality literature and appealing reading for teens".

The Saga of Darren Shan has received relatively positive reviews from Western critics. The Saga of Darren Shan was listed by GraphicNovelReporter as a top pick in graphic novels for the summer of 2009. In GraphicNovelReporter's John Hogan's review for the first volume, Arai's art was praised, with Hogan noting that he did "a superb job of creating a manga that feels like a healthy mix of styles, both American and Japanese." Writing for School Library Journal, Snow Wildsmith reviewed the first volume positively, noting the emotion and introspection present in it, but commented that though its "strong and holds together well", it "felt like it was just set up for the later volumes."

PopCulture Shock's Grant Goodman graded the first volume with an "A", calling the character designs "strange-but-lovely" and that pace of the "second half", which "rushes forward at a breakneck pace", causes "Darren Shan's tale [to be] a standout title among the glut of standard shonen manga." The second volume was reviewed by Goodman in July 27, 2009's "Manga Minis" review segment. Goodman also rated the volume with an "A" and commended the pacing, as well as saying that the darkness allowed for it to be "accessible to an older audience". Deb Aoki, writing for the website About.com, rated the first volume with 3 and a half stars out of 5, commending its character designs, appeal to fans, and story. However, she also noted that the gore "might disturb sensitive readers", and pointed out some scenes as being too "over-the-top" emotionally and that the art was prone to "awkwardly-drawn moments" that distract readers. Manga Life's Joy Kim criticized that the first volume was "extremely predictable" and the art as "occasionally awkward", but felt it was "a good alternative" to shōjo series focusing on vampires "with the emotional maturity and tortured love lives of emo high school students".

Grant Goodman rated the fifth volume with an "A", concluding that it is "brimming with action, mystery, and betrayal—all of which add up to a [sic] create a manga you do not want to miss."
