= The Best Damn Wrestling Event Period =

2004 professional wrestling television special

- Promotion: Total Nonstop Action Wrestling
- Date: October 27, 2004 (aired November 10 and 11, 2004)
- City: Orlando, Florida
- Venue: iMPACT! Zone

The Best Damn Wrestling Event Period was a two night Best Damn Sports Show Period television special produced by Fox Sports Net in collaboration with professional wrestling promotion Total Nonstop Action Wrestling (TNA).

== Results ==
Night 1

No.	Results	Stipulations
1	AJ Styles defeated Alex Shelley	Singles match
2	America's Most Wanted (Chris Harris and James Storm) defeated Dallas and Kid Kash	Tag Team match
3	Christopher Daniels defeated Frankie Kazarian (with Traci)	Singles match
4	Ron Killings defeated Raven	Singles match
5	Teo defeated Puppet	Hardcore match with Tom Arnold as special guest referee
6	Chris Sabin defeated Elix Skipper and Sonjay Dutt	Ultimate X match to determine the #1 contender to the TNA X Division Championship at Turning Point

Night 2

No.	Results	Stipulations
1	3Live Kru (BG James and Konnan) (with John Salley) defeated Team Canada (Bobby Roode and Eric Young) (with Scott D'Amore)	Tag Team Flag match
2	AJ Styles defeated Abyss	Tables match
3	Tom Arnold (with Leeann Tweeden) defeated Puppet	Singles match
4	Petey Williams (with Scott D'Amore) defeated Sonjay Dutt, Shark Boy, Jerrelle Clark and Michael Shane (with Traci)	X Division Five-way match
5	Bryan Cox and Monty Brown defeated The Naturals (Andy Douglas and Chase Stevens)	Tag Team match
6	Jeff Jarrett defeated Jeff Hardy	Six Sides of Steel match

== See also ==
- The Best Damn Sports Show Period
