= Touch Me (1997 film) =

- Directed by: H. Gordon Boos
- Screenplay by: H. Gordon Boos
- Produced by: Michael Sourapas
- Starring: Amanda Peet; Michael Vartan; Peter Facinelli; Kari Wuhrer
- Cinematography: Giles Dunning
- Edited by: Steven Nevius
- Music by: Claude Foisy
- Production company: Devin Entertainment
- Distributed by: Devin Entertainment
- Release date: September 5, 1997
- Running time: 107 minutes
- Country: United States
- Language: English

Touch Me is a 1997 drama-romance film directed by H. Gordon Boos. It stars Amanda Peet, Michael Vartan, Kari Wuhrer and Peter Facinelli.

== Cast ==
- Amanda Peet as Bridgette
- Michael Vartan as Adam
- Peter Facinelli as "Bail"
- Kari Wuhrer as Margot
- Greg Louganis as David
- Erica Gimpel as Kareen
- Jamie Harris as "Link"
- Stephen Macht as Robert
- Ann Turkel as Linda
- Tim Quill as Michael
- Jenette Goldstein as Gabrielle
- Jane Lynch as Counselor
- Leslie Bibb as Fawn

== Release ==
The film was released on September 5, 1997, at the Toronto International Film Festival.

== Reception ==
The film received average reviews from critics. It has a 43% rating on Rotten Tomatoes.
