= The Saga of Darren Shan =

Series of books by Darren Shan

- Boxset of books 1–6 of the Saga, published by HarperCollins.
- Vampire Blood trilogy: Cirque du Freak (2000); The Vampire's Assistant (2000); Tunnels of Blood (2000); Vampire Rites trilogy: Vampire Mountain (2001); Trials of Death (2001); The Vampire Prince (2002); Vampire War trilogy: Hunters of the Dusk (2002); Allies of the Night (2002); Killers of the Dawn (2003); Vampire Destiny trilogy: The Lake of Souls (2003); Lord of the Shadows (2004); Sons of Destiny (2004)
- Author: Darren O'Shaughnessy (as Darren Shan)
- Country: Ireland
- Language: English/Irish
- Genre: Horror, fantasy, thriller
- Publisher: HarperCollins Children's Books (UK); Little Brown and Company (USA)
- Published: 4 January 2000 – 31 March 2004
- Media type: Print (hardback & paperback); Audiobook eBook
- Preceded by: The Saga of Larten Crepsley

The Saga of Darren Shan (known as Cirque Du Freak: The Saga of Darren Shan in the United States) is a young adult 12-part book series written by Darren O'Shaughnessy about the struggle of Darren Shan, a boy who has become involved in the world of vampires. As of October 2008, the book has been published in 33 countries around the world, in 30 different languages. A film based on the first three books in the series was released in theatres on 23 October 2009. Blackstone Audio has also released CD recordings of all 12 books in the series, read by Ralph Lïster. Between 2011 and 2012, a four part prequel series titled The Saga of Larten Crepsley depicts the life of Larten Crepsley from his tale of becoming a vampire, up until to where the events of Cirque Du Freak begin.

== Background ==
Darren O'Shaughnessy wrote and published the first book of the series, Cirque du Freak, under the pen name Darren Shan as a side project between two adult books. Cirque du Freak received good reviews and Warner Bros. bought the movie rights prior to publication, though the film was never made and the film rights returned to Shan after three years. Later, Universal Pictures acquired the film rights and a feature film was released in theatres on 23 October 2009.

== Plot outline ==
The Saga of Darren Shan follows the story of Darren Shan, a normal human boy who is coerced by the vampire Larten Crepsley into becoming his assistant and a half-vampire.

- In the first trilogy, known as Vampire Blood or The Vampire's Assistant, Darren learns about and comes to accept his vampirism.
  - In the first book, Cirque du Freak (also known as Cirque du Freak: A Living Nightmare), Mr. Crepsley makes Darren a half-vampire in return for saving the life of one of Darren's best friends, Steve Leonard.
  - In the second book, The Vampire's Assistant, Crepsley notes that Darren is quite lonely and brings him back to the freak show, where he befriends a snake-boy, Evra Von, and a human, Sam Grest.
  - In the third book, Tunnels of Blood, Crepsley brings Darren Shan and Evra Von to his hometown, where one of the vampires' enemies, a Vampaneze named Murlough, is murdering innocent people.
- In the second trilogy, known as Vampire Rites, Darren learns about the vampire clan and seeks their acceptance.
  - In the fourth book, Vampire Mountain, Mr. Crepsley and Darren make their ascent up Vampire Mountain and learn about the rites of the vampires.
  - In the fifth book, Trials of Death, Darren faces the Trials of Initiation, nicknamed Trials of Death, to gain the recognition of other vampires as one of the youngest vampires to be recruited in decades.
  - In the sixth book, The Vampire Prince, Darren finds out about a traitor among them and tries to stop plans to destroy the vampire clan. He himself becomes a Vampire Prince, in this book.
- In the third trilogy, known as Vampire War, Darren learns he may have a larger role to play in the fate of the vampires (and of the world) than he had ever thought.
  - In the seventh book, Hunters of the Dusk, the hunt for the Lord of the Vampaneze, who is destined to destroy the vampire clan, begins.
  - In the eighth book, Allies of the Night, Darren meets some of his past friends who now fit into his quest.
  - In the ninth book, Killers of the Dawn, Darren faces the Lord of the Vampaneze for the second time.
- In the fourth trilogy, known as Vampire Destiny, Darren is forced to make some difficult decisions, finally taking his destiny into his own hands and dealing with the consequences.
  - In the tenth book, The Lake of Souls, Darren travels to an unfamiliar land to find out who his best friend, Harkat Mulds, used to be; as a "Little Person", Harkat's mind sans memories was placed into a new body after his death.
  - In the eleventh book, Lord of the Shadows, Darren finds out more about the Lord of the Shadows and gets closer to his last confrontation with the Lord of the Vampaneze.
  - In the twelfth book, Sons of Destiny, Darren faces the Lord of the Vampaneze for a final fight, and changes his destiny forever.

== Main characters ==
=== Darren Shan's Vampires ===
The vampires in The Darren Shan Saga are different from vampires found in popular culture. They are alive, meaning that they can be killed by a well-placed bullet, mutilation, decapitation or piercing of the heart (though they will wake up within a day or less if their neck is broken). Vampires do not have fangs and they do not drink blood from the neck. Rather, they drink blood from the victim by cutting a vein with their hard, and sharp nails; drinking small amounts of blood, and then healing it with their saliva. Their nails can also be used to scale walls in a spider-like manner. Draining all of a human's blood would have a vampire absorb a part of the spirit of the victim, allowing the vampire to see into their memories (Darren does this in The Vampire's Assistant, to save the spirit of his dying friend). Vampires have a partial immunity to Sunlight; which means they can stay in pure daylight for 4-5 hours before disintegrating or burning up. However, despite this, Vampires can be active during the day (provided they stay in the shade). By contrast, Half-Vampires have complete immunity to Sunlight by default. Vampires are not bothered by garlic, silver, or holy objects. Fresh human blood is the most nutritious for vampires, but they can feed on preserved human blood or the blood of certain animals if necessary. Some animals' blood, however, is toxic to vampires. Vampires cannot reproduce, due to all their fluids being frozen. Vampires are created via blood-to-blood contact with humans, traditionally through the fingertips, but if any creature, human or animal, were to orally ingest vampire blood, it would be driven into a murderous frenzy and then die (similar to rabies). Full Vampires age one year in appearance for every ten human years that pass (1/10), where as half-vampires age one year in appearance for every five human years that pass (1/5). This comes into play in the series when Darren meets an old girlfriend he had; now they are adults but Darren still looks about the same as he did when they first met. The oldest vampire in the series is Paris Skyle, who was "Blooded" at age two and lived for over eight hundred years. Vampires cast reflections and shadows but cannot be photographed due to a particular vibration of their atoms. Also, as in folklore, vampires sleep in coffins.

Vampires are considerably stronger, tougher, and fitter than humans; able to outperform humans in any physical activity and run at speeds faster than the human eye can follow, a process called "Flitting". Flitting causes a static charge to build up in a vampire's body, which Mr. Crepsley learned to use to force open locks. A vampire's senses are all similar to that of predators, allowing them to see in darkness, hear heartbeats, and track scents. Their bones and teeth are stronger than those of humans, allowing them to endure incredible amounts of physical trauma, are resistant to most chemicals and diseases, and are able to heal and recover much quicker than humans. A vampire's healing factor is not as effective as in most fiction, though they are more resistant to fatal injury compared to humans and other living creatures, and, unlike the beautiful vampires of Anne Rice, most of Shan's vampires are very average, normal and plain in appearance. More abilities include breathing an invisible gas that renders a human unconscious, telepathically communicating with other vampires and humans (three vampires could also mentally command spiders), and locating vampires and humans whose thought patterns they have learned to recognize. The blood of snakes, rats, and cats are poisonous to them.

Vampire society is ruled by honor, personal pride, and tradition. They have a strict hierarchy with higher ranking vampires having absolute rule over lower ranking ones, though they exercise their powers in moderation and are respectful of those beneath them. There are far fewer female vampires than male ones. Vampire matings last only ten or fifteen years with the couple then choosing to re-mate or go their separate ways. Vampires are forbidden to use projectile weapons like guns, bows, and crossbows as they view these as dishonourable, preferring hand-to-hand fighting with swords, axes, etc., or throwing weapons such as a shuriken. Vampires live old fashioned lives: no vampire aside from Darren Shan is shown making references to pop culture, or using computers. Vampires see humans as a chaotic and slightly inferior race, but most value human lives. Some vampires form friendships with humans and many fall in love with them. Vampire Gavner Purl boasts a pair of pink underpants embroidered with elephants, a present from a former human girlfriend.

Darren Shan's vampires do not follow the religions they did as humans, but worship an unidentified pantheon. They believe that the souls of good vampires are reborn as wolves in the eternal nights of a distant world called Paradise, while evil vampire souls remain bound to the Earth for eternity. They do have gods, but there are a great number of them and they are referred to as the Vampire Gods. Vampires believe they are descended from wolves, just as humans have evolved from primates. Wolves are held as the cousins of vampires. Wolves like vampires, especially since they have a scent that means no harm to them.

=== Vampaneze ===
In The Saga of Darren Shan the Vampaneze are sworn rivals to the vampire believing that there is honour in killing their victims and claiming their souls. They were originally vampires who broke away from the clan (600 years before the third book) and claimed themselves a new race (Vampaneze) because of the different customs they held. A violent war followed, which eventually ended in a truce when human interference threatened the survival of both races, and both groups mutually agreed to stay out of each other's affairs. This extends even to those who have become insane such as Murlough - killing him risked bringing the wrath of the entire race down on Darren and Mr Crepsley's heads, and the vampires would be honour-bound not to intervene. The Vampaneze are considered antagonists, though they only appear that way due to the misleading image of Murlough, the Vampaneze Lord and the War of the Scars. Mr Crepsley himself noted that vampaneze had some positive traditions such as their refusal to lie and their sense of honour. The Vampaneze have purple skin and red hair, eyes, lips, and fingernails though it takes a couple of decades for this colouring to set in. This is a side effect due to drinking a lot of blood: though killing humans when draining their blood was originally a choice based on their beliefs, in the modern day their blood compels Vampaneze to kill when they drink. Many Vampaneze do not want to fight the vampires, and though Gannen Harst has sworn to protect the Lord of Vampaneze, Steve Leonard, in the final book Harst does not stop Steve from putting himself in danger, as if he merely wants the war between Vampires and Vampaneze settled one way or the other.

The Vampaneze are first mentioned in Tunnels of Blood and become a main part of the plot throughout the rest of the series. Examples of Vampaneze include Murlough and Gannen Harst.

=== Death's Touch sign ===
The Death's Touch sign is a hand position used in The Saga of Darren Shan series. It is used by vampires throughout Vampire Mountain to show their appreciation towards a dead vampire, or one that is likely to die. The sign involves placing one's middle finger on the right hand in the middle of the forehead, with the ring finger on the left eyelid, the index finger on the right eyelid, and the pinky and thumb outstretched. The sign itself translates to the saying, "Even in death, may you be triumphant". The sign first appears in the fifth book, Trials of Death, when Darren must take the Trials of Initiation. The vampires in the mountain direct the sign towards him to wish him good luck.

== Manga ==
A manga series based on the series, The Saga of Darren Shan, was published in the Shogakukan anthology Weekly Shōnen Sunday by Takahiro Arai in a weekly serialization. The volumes were being published in the United Kingdom and United States by HarperCollins and Yen Press, respectively.

== Short stories ==
Darren Shan has released numerous short stories on his website, all of which tie into the saga.

- "An Essay on Vampires by Steve Leopard": The story ties in with Cirque Du Freak. It's in the style of an essay, presumably written in-universe before the events of the novel.
- "Annie's Diary": The story is based on Darren's sister's diary during the events of Cirque du Freak.
- "Tiny Terrors": The story centres on the mysterious Desmond Tiny, and takes place during The Vampire's Assistant.
- "Transylvania Trek": The story is fictionally authored by Sam Grest, a character from The Vampire's Assistant.
- "Shanta Claus": A special story that follows "Shanta" Claus as he visits the homes of many characters in the series. It serves as a crossover between The Saga of Darren Shan and The Demonata. It is only available at Christmas.
- "Lonely Lefty": A story centring on Harkat Mulds. It takes place during the events of Tunnels of Blood.
- "Bride of Sam Grest": Another short story "written" by Sam Grest, a character from The Vampire's Assistant.
- "An Affair of the Night": A story centring on Gavner Purl, before his untimely death. It ties in with Trials of Death

The Sam Grest stories have been included in the Midnight Feast collection.
