= Sports Geniuses =

- Genre: Game Show
- Presented by: Matt Vasgersian with Lisa Guerrero

Production
- Running time: 30 minutes

Original release
- Network: Fox Sports Net
- Release: March 27 – June 23, 2000

Sports Geniuses is an American sports-themed game show that aired for 65 episodes from March 27, 2000, until June 23, 2000, on cable channel Fox Sports Net. It was the network's second game show (Ultimate Fan League was the first, airing in 1998 and 1999, and only other). The advertising campaign for the show won a Clio Award.

Sportscaster Matt Vasgersian hosted, with Lisa Guerrero as his co-host.

== Gameplay ==
Three contestants played a sports trivia game for big prizes.

=== Round 1 (1st Period) ===
The first round was played similar to Jeopardy!, with four categories each containing five questions that ranged in value from 10 to 50 points. Two questions in the round were designated "Panasonic Double Plays", and were questions that employed video clips and had follow-up questions attached which if answered correctly doubled the value of the question.

==== 30 Second Blitz ====
After all the questions have been asked or until time was called, a speed round called the 30 Second Blitz was played. In this, the players would be shown a photo of an athlete and had to identify who it was. Each correct answer was worth 30 points; the round ended after seven photos or when the 30 seconds expired, whichever came first.

=== Round 2 (2nd Period) ===
The next round of play was almost identical to the first round, with the following exceptions:

- Questions were now worth 20-100 points
- Wrong answers deducted points
- No Panasonic Double Plays

In addition, a special guest athlete or other sports personality would appear to read all the questions from one category.

A new wrinkle was added for this round, called "The Shaft." The third place player was given The Shaft (which was a silver shaft of a baseball bat, hence the name) to start the round and could use it at any point in the round to force one of their opponents to answer one of the questions on the board (and effectively giving them the next "Shaft" usage). Each player could only be "Shafted" once, and once The Shaft returned to someone who had already used it, it was taken out of play.

At the end of this round, when all of the questions had been asked or until time was called, whichever came first, the two highest-scoring players advanced to the final round. The player with the lowest score was eliminated from the game. If the second round ended in a tie for second place, a tie-breaker question was asked and whoever buzzed in with a correct answer would advance to the final round with the first place player. However, if a player who buzzed in gave an incorrect answer or took too long, the other player automatically moved to the final round. If the round ended in a three-way tie, Matt would ask two tiebreaker questions and only the two players that answered correctly moved on the final round.

=== Final Face-Off ===
In the final Face-off, the two remaining players were given a category for each question (i.e., Super Bowl winners), and the value would start at 100 points and increase by 10 points for each correct answer given by the contestants, who alternated giving answers. If a player gave an incorrect answer or froze, their opponent would receive the points in the pot and play would continue, otherwise the value of the pot would roll over to the next question. Each subsequent question's starting value would increase by 25 points.

Play continued in this fashion until time ran out, at which point the contestant with the highest score, was declared the winner and won a prize package, including an exotic vacation. All other players won announced prizes.

== Tournament ==
Sports Geniuses ended its run with an invitational tournament featuring the show's biggest winners to compete for a chance at a new Chevy S-10 truck and trips to each of the four major American sports' championships (the World Series, Super Bowl, NBA Finals and Stanley Cup Finals). Daniel Katz won the tournament, due to Kirk Minihane not being invited, despite his qualifying record.

== Play-Along ==
Before the final commercial break, co-host Lisa Guerrero would introduce, via webcam, comic "Cousin" Sal Iacono, and he would ask a question to a home viewer winner of an interactive game on the show's website about his/her favorite sports team. A correct answer to that question won a prize.
