= The Best Damn Sports Show Period =

- Genre: Sports; Talk show
- Presented by: See: Hosts
- Composer: Al Eaton
- Country of origin: United States
- Original language: English

Production
- Executive producers: Jermiah Bosgang; Mark Mayer; George Greenberg; Robert Lifton; John Entz
- Producers: Eric Weinberger; Eric Shanks; Tally Hair; Jason Cahill; Graham Hughes; Brian DeCloux; Michael Hughes; Dana Leiken; Laura Mickelson; Laura Marcus; Joel Santos; Matt Schnider
- Production locations: Fox Network Center (Fox Studio Lot Building 101), 10201 W Pico Blvd, Century City, Los Angeles, California
- Running time: 45–48 min
- Production company: Fox Sports Network

Original release
- Network: Fox Sports Net
- Release: July 23, 2001 – June 30, 2009

The Best Damn Sports Show Period is an American sports television show that aired on Fox Sports Net from July 23, 2001 to June 30, 2009. The show regularly featured irreverent and opinionated interviews with top athletes, coaches, celebrities, and entertainers. It also aired Top 50 countdown shows and other sports specialty shows. Since its debut on July 23, 2001, BDSSP welcomed thousands of guests and aired more than 1,300 episodes. The last original show aired June 30, 2009; however, FSN taped a handful of Top 50 specials.

The show aired weeknights at 9 p.m. and 11 p.m. local time, usually after FSN Final Score, or later if there was a local live sporting event that ran longer than expected, depending on the region and telecast schedule.

== History ==
=== Conception ===
In 1999, FSN's nightly sports news show - Fox Sports News, later renamed to the National Sports Report - was losing ratings ground to ESPN's SportsCenter. The executives at FSN wanted a 2-3 hour show that could provide consistent, original programming on nights when there were no local basketball, baseball, or hockey games being broadcast in FSN regions.

The decision was made to do a sports roundtable type of show with the same camaraderie and energy as the Fox NFL Sunday pregame show. Fox NFL Sunday, which debuted in 1994 on FSN's network brother, Fox Sports, quickly became the top-rated NFL pregame show due in part to the personalities of NFL veterans Terry Bradshaw and Howie Long. However, the new show on FSN would focus on not just football, but every sport, as well as the entertainment world. Fox Sports' president David Hill modeled many aspects of the show from The Footy Show, a sports talk show which covered the Australian Football League in Australia (Hill's home country).

The preliminary idea for the format of the new show for FSN would have one main host and different ex-athletes as hosts for each major sport. It would interweave sports talk with comedic sports-related content.

==== Test run ====
In June 2001, the producers started doing screen tests with over 30 different TV hosts and former athletes. Tom Arnold was one of the celebrities called to try out as the "comedian" of the show. He was reluctant to do it at first, and "didn't know what to expect", but he wasn't doing much at the time because he was waiting for True Lies 2 to be green-lit (the 9/11 attacks a few months later halted those plans). He was a part of one of the last test-runs of the panel and was signed to the show. One week before the show was to launch, National Sports Report sports anchor Chris Rose was called to help sit-in and host one of the show test runs. What was a temporary rehearsal turned into a permanent gig, as Rose was named main host.

=== Show debut ===
The original cast was set: Chris Rose, Tom Arnold, former NBA player Reggie Theus, former NFL Defensive end Deacon Jones, and former Philadelphia Phillies 1st baseman John Kruk. The show debuted quietly at midnight on July 23, 2001, as a one-hour weeknight show on Fox Sports Net with former NFL great Jim Brown as its very first guest. The network deliberately launched the show without much fanfare and hype, in what was called a "soft launch", knowing that there still might be adjustments and changes after the show made its TV debut. Within two months, former Detroit Piston John Salley replaced Reggie Theus and St. Louis Rams' lineman D'Marco Farr replaced Jones. Lisa Guerrero sat behind the anchor desk, reporting on sports updates and highlights.

==== Original format and reaction ====
The show led off with all the hosts talking about three to four current sports issues and topics. Sports media writers were quick to pan the show, with one sports columnist writing:

If you're looking for high-minded talk... this isn't the show for you. To enjoy [the show], you must suspend your intelligence and good taste before turning on the TV. The show is locker-room humor at its best, or worst, depending on your point of view."

In November 2001, the Los Angeles Times wrote: "It's certainly not the worst either, and it's getting a lot better."

A growing amount of high-profile athletes and celebrities started to attend the show, with its relaxed, entertainment-focused approach. The show quickly gained more credibility in its first few months with big-name guests such as Arnold Schwarzenegger, Sammy Sosa, Shaquille O'Neal, and Terrell Owens. A main part of the show's set was "The Cage", where guests performed varying athletic challenges with the hosts. Some of the initial memorable "Cage" moments were Terrell Owens in a touchdown celebration competition, Shaq donning a blond wig and recreating famous movie scenes from Casablanca and Jerry Maguire, and Gary Payton leading a trash-talking competition. The competitions that were too large in size were brought outside the Best Damn set into the Fox backlot. Such an example was a tricycle race between the hosts and Lance Armstrong. By November 2001, the show was expanded to 90 minutes, and by mid-December it jumped to a 2-hour format.

==== Original comedy segments ====
The sports talk in the show was mixed in with different pre-produced comedy bits and features which many times lead the show to commercial break. One of the first comedy segments within the show was the "Nightly/Daily Sports Report", hosted by Ken Rudulph, a Daily Show-type satirical look at the latest sports news reported at an anchor desk, which soon became a daily staple in the show for its first year. The show would end with Tom Arnold's "Things You Would Never Say To..." A different athlete was highlighted each day, and Tom Arnold would belt out around 10 different lines you would never say to that athlete. One example was "Things You Would Never Say to Patrick Ewing": "Hey, Ewing, don't worry about the swelling on your fingers. It's not like you have any rings to put on them!"

=== 2002 ===
February 2002 saw the cancellation of the National Sports Report, leaving Best Damn as FSN's flagship show; indeed, the rapidly-increasing popularity of Best Damn was cited as a reason for the NSR's demise. FSN then opted to provide news capsules during primetime programming, as well as extended news reports during Best Damn, as a substitute for the NSR.

Also in 2002, former Dallas Cowboys wide receiver Michael Irvin joined the roundtable as the main football analyst and was known for his outlandish and eccentric wardrobe on the set. Former Philadelphia Inquirer columnist Stephen A. Smith made his TV debut on the set and via satellite as an NBA insider for the show. Model Leeann Tweeden came on board to report on features and be a correspondent on the road. In addition to athletes, the show drew many hot celebrities to the guest chairs such as Adam Sandler, Matt Damon, and Ben Affleck.

Many critics argue that this time period was the strongest for the show's cast with Rose, Tom Arnold, John Salley, Michael Irvin, and John Kruk presenting an "irreverent mix of entertainment and insight in sports that you cannot find anywhere else on TV."

In June 2002, FSN launched its biggest advertising and promotional blitz for the show with the "Best Damn All-Star Summer", with superstar athletes and celebrities appearing on the show, along with a barrage on newspaper, billboard, and radio advertising to help garner more recognition just before the show's one-year anniversary.

Part of the campaign included a Best Damn celebrity roast for Tom Arnold, a Best Damn awards show entitled the "Best Dammies", special guest appearances by Will Smith, Tony Hawk, and Charles Barkley, and Counting Crows performing a summer concert outside the Best Damn set on the 20th Century Fox backlot in Los Angeles.

=== 2003–04 ===
In mid-2003, Best Damn had to deal with the departure of the entertaining personalities of John Kruk and Michael Irvin to ESPN. They experimented with numerous guest hosts to a varying degree of success. Among just a few of the names to sit in the Best Damn chairs alongside Rose and Salley as part-time hosts were Bryan Cox, Ray Crockett, Ron Darling, Rocket Ismail, Kevin Kennedy, Brian Bosworth, Eric Dickerson, Herschel Walker, Jason Sehorn, Steve Lyons, and Tony Bruno.

At times, the show would struggle to find its camaraderie among its cast because of the frequent changes to its main panel. Different themes and specialty weeks were tried for the show. One example was "Best Damn Decades Week", in which every day of the week represented a different decade in sports. Jim Brown, Terry Bradshaw, Joe Montana, and Phil Jackson appeared on the show on separate days to represent the respective decades they dominated. Bob Eubanks even appeared to host a "Best Damn Newlywed Game" for "1970s day", in which the Best Damn hosts brought in their actual wives for a real game show on air. Rick Springfield brought his entire band on the set to perform the classic hit "Jessie's Girl" for "1980s day". In October, Best Damn did a "Date the Pros" contest, where girls entered a competition to win a date with former wide receiver Johnnie Morton.

In late October, all the hosts dressed up in costume for the entire show to celebrate Halloween. All guests on set and on satellite also dressed up in costume. Since then, it has been a yearly Halloween tradition on the Best Damn set, along with a custom-carved Best Damn pumpkin for each of the Best Damn hosts.

On October 27, 2004, Best Damn partnered with professional wrestling promotion Total Nonstop Action Wrestling (TNA) to produce a two night television special The Best Damn Wrestling Event Period which aired on November 10 and 11.

=== 2005: New direction for the show ===
The beginning of the year presented a crossroads for the show, as its ratings had plateaued and after being on the air for over three years, some felt it needed to be reinvented. In January 2005, following the Christmas/New Year's break, the program was revamped to appear like a late-night talk show. Original host Rose was dropped, and Arnold was made the headlining star with Salley as his sidekick. Sitting behind a desk, Arnold did comedy bits and an opening monologue, similar to other late night shows such as Late Night with Conan O'Brien and Late Show with David Letterman.

In February 2005, with the new format, the show traveled to Jacksonville, Florida to tape a special episode of the show aired on the Fox Broadcasting Company, as a part of Fox Sports' pregame coverage of Super Bowl XXXIX. The special's title was changed to The Best Darn Super Bowl Road Show, Period ("Darn" being substituted for "Damn") so it would not offend network executives or viewers. (A similar temporary change was later made to the show's name for the duration of one show so that Kansas City Chiefs head coach Herm Edwards, who disapproves of profanity, would appear as a guest.)

With the new direction, they would feature either Top 50 or 100 moments related to sports such as bloopers, dangerous mishaps, or historic moments. Because of the witty tone, sometimes videos indirectly related to sports would appear in the Honorable Mention segments such as Fidel Castro infamously falling hard after his speech.

=== Back to the original formula ===
Although the "late-night" format drew notable guests such as Snoop Dogg, Dennis Rodman, Bob Knight, Chris Rock, Derek Jeter, and even former president Jimmy Carter; many loyal long-time viewers were confused and felt abandoned by the new format. The show had taken a big step away from what had always been its sense of purpose - a group of athletes sitting around and talking sports as an ensemble-cast.

By March 2005, the show was quickly formatted back to its original concept, with Chris Rose returning as the main host. John Salley would stay aboard. Two weeks later, former NFL QB Rodney Peete and former MLB closer Rob Dibble were named as permanent hosts alongside Rose and Salley. Tom Arnold left the show as a host, and would return occasionally only for special events and/or segments. The show also stopped running many of its pre-produced comedy bits and segments. The show was now back down to an hour long, which remained that length for the remainder of its run.

=== 2006–2007 ===
In March 2006, BDSSP had a week-long celebration to commemorate its 1000th show. The show counted down its Top 100 moments of Best Damn history. Former hosts Michael Irvin and Tom Arnold came back to the set to help celebrate the achievement, along with some of Best Damn's favorite guests such as Jerry Rice, Pam Anderson, Michael Strahan, and Deion Sanders.

March 1, 2006, was officially The Best Damn Sports Show Period's 1,000th show. It was proclaimed "Best Damn Sports Show Period Day" by the Mayor of Hollywood (who was a guest on the broadcast).

==== April Fools' Day 2006 ====
The show broadcast its most memorable April Fools' Day prank with a fight between Tom Arnold and Michael Strahan, that not only fooled viewers but also cast members and producers. On Friday, March 31, 2006, Tom Arnold returned to the show to promote his "new tell-all book", which blasted his former BDSSP hosts and colleagues as well as many notable athletes, including many New York Giants players. Strahan became heated at Tom Arnold after an uncomfortable two-segment interview. He became so angry, he started wrestling Arnold, and Arnold retaliated by tackling him to the ground. Strahan pretended to be very hurt by screaming and clutching his shoulder as the cameras cut to black. It fooled cast members Rodney Peete and Rob Dibble enough to have them intervene in the fight. Rodney Peete went so far as to give Tom rabbit punches while he broke up what he thought was a real fight. The next day, the New York Giants' media relations reported that they received several calls about the injury status of their star defensive end. It also worked enough to fool the popular internet sports site Deadspin into reporting it as a real event immediately after it was broadcast.

=== 2007–2008 ===
In summer of 2007, Best Damn added Olympic Gold Medalist Amanda Beard to their TV roster. Amanda would serve as a correspondent for the show and also give reports and a behind-the-scenes look at her preparations for her appearance in the 2008 Summer Olympics in Beijing. Charissa Thompson also was added as one of the main hosts for the show.

In May 2008, Rodney Peete and Rob Dibble left the show after over three years on the Best Damn set. FSN decided to replace the duo with rotating guest hosts to work with regulars Chris Rose, John Salley and Charissa Thompson.

After the change, some of the guest hosts included former running back Eddie George, former New York Giants defensive end Michael Strahan, University of Kentucky and former University of Memphis men's basketball coach John Calipari, Arizona Diamondbacks left fielder Eric Byrnes, former NBA guard Gary Payton, Baltimore Ravens linebacker Ray Lewis and Fox MLB analyst Mark Grace.

At the same time, the network noted that the use of rotating guest hosts is keeping the show fresh and allows viewers to take a glimpse at the current and ex-athletes who shine in front of the TV camera.

In July 2008, Best Damn celebrated its seven-year anniversary. Up to that date, it had aired over 1600 original shows and had welcomed over 3000 guests. By then, it had spawned a specialty show on the Internet, as it broadcasts new 30-minute podcasts every week through iTunes and its FoxSports.com Best Damn home page.

=== Finale ===
On June 30, 2009, Best Damn aired its last show. While the series would continue to air new episodes throughout the summer, Fox Sports Net announced that a small number of top 50 specials would be taped to add to its current stable of shows. Chris Rose and Charissa Thompson hosted a retrospective introducing some of the best video clips from the past eight seasons. At the end, former co-host Tom Arnold bade the show farewell

== Hosts ==
- Tom Arnold: Host (2001–2009)
- Chris Rose: Host (2001–2009)
- John Salley: Host (2001–2009)
- Lisa Guerrero: Reporter (2001–2005)
- Leeann Tweeden: Reporter (2001–2007)
- Charissa Thompson: Reporter (2006–2009)
- Lauren Sánchez: Reporter
- Michelle Bonner: Reporter
- John Kruk: MLB expert
- Michael Irvin: NFL expert
- D'Marco Farr: NFL expert
- Rob Dibble: MLB expert (2005–2008)
- Rodney Peete: NFL expert (2004–2008)
- Bryan Cox: NFL expert
- Ray Crockett: NFL expert
- Stephen A. Smith: NBA expert
- Deacon Jones: NFL expert
- Reggie Theus: NBA expert

=== Announcer ===
Announcer Tomm Looney was the announcer for the show's entire run and currently does sports updates and co-hosting on JT the Brick's show on Fox Sports Radio.
