= Allies of the Night =

2002 novel by Darren Shan

- First edition (UK)
- Author: Darren Shan
- Language: English
- Series: The Saga of Darren Shan
- Release number: 8
- Genre: Young adult, Horror novel
- Publisher: Collins (UK); Little, Brown (US)
- Publication date: 4 November 2002 (UK) 31 August 2004 (US)
- Publication place: United Kingdom
- Media type: Print (Paperback)
- ISBN: 0-00-713780-X
- Preceded by: Hunters of the Dusk
- Followed by: Killers of the Dawn

Allies of the Night is the eighth book of The Saga of Darren Shan by Darren Shan. It is part of the Vampire War trilogy, which comprises three books: Hunters of the Dusk, Allies of the Night, and Killers of the Dawn. Allies of the Night was first published in Great Britain by HarperCollins in 2002. It was then published in the Vampire War trilogy in 2005.

== Plot summary ==
Darren, Harkat, and Mr. Crepsley [Vancha going back to Vampire Mountain to inform the other Princes and Generals of their encounter with the Vampaneze Lord] go to Mr. Crepsley's hometown once again to investigate if the Vampaneze had set up territories there. But soon after their arrival Darren is discovered by the police and forced to attend school. He has trouble with most of his subjects as he only has a middle school education, but luckily his English teacher is Debbie, his old girlfriend from his first visit to this city.

Mr. Crepsley has to go back to Vampire Mountain again for Paris Skyle's funeral, leaving Darren and Harkat to continue the investigations alone. One night on his way back to the hotel room the three are staying in, Darren encounters a Vampaneze with hooks for hands and a mask wrapped around his face. The Vampaneze attacks, but Darren is saved by his old friend Steve. Steve joins Darren for the hunt of the Vampaneze, claiming he's changed his ways and now understands who the real enemy is and dropped his desire for vengeance against Darren and Mr. Crepsley long ago.

Darren later reveals himself as a vampire to Debbie, and after a long explanation and a day's contemplating she joins Darren and Steve for the fight. Mr. Crepsley comes back and helps Darren pursue the Vampaneze, but understandably doesn't trust Steve. Darren does convince him, however, that Steve will be a big help for them and lets him come with them. Vancha also joins them again a few days later.

They chase the hooked Vampaneze through the sewers at night, but the Vampaneze led them into a trap. Darren and his team are soon surrounded and the Vampaneze Lord makes his second appearance. Darren tries to kill him, but is stopped by Steve, who shows his true side as being a half-vampaneze and betraying Darren and his friends. The hooked Vampaneze is also revealed to be RV (Previously known as Reggie Veggie, but now claims it stands for Righteous Vampaneze).

A fight begins between the Hunters and the Vampaneze. Vancha charges through the Vampets, scattering them and Mr. Crepsley follows, slicing with his nails to bring down many Vampaneze. Darren soon beats Steve and is about to finish him off, but RV uses Debbie as a hostage. RV, Gannen Harst, and the Lord soon leave with the threat that they will kill Debbie if they are followed. Darren and Vancha take a Vampet and Steve as their hostage and are given a warning by Gannen to leave the tunnels immediately or he'll send Vampaneze to finish them off.
