= Tim Quill =

American actor (1962–2017)

- Born: October 18, 1962; Wilmington, Delaware, U.S.
- Died: September 25, 2017 (aged 54); Red Bank, New Jersey, U.S.
- Occupation: Actor

Tim Quill (October 18, 1962 - September 25, 2017) was an American actor.

Born and raised in Wilmington, Delaware, Quill relocated to New York City in the 1980s to pursue acting, and was trained at the William Esper Acting Studio.

Quill made his debut in the Vietnam War set Hamburger Hill playing the role of Pvt. Joe Beletsky, following it up with roles in the films Listen to Me, Hiding Out, Next of Kin, and Argo.

Quill made numerous appearances in various television series including Miami Vice (episode 5x18), in 1989, ER in 1997, and a recurring role as Lt. Mason Painter in the first season of JAG. He appeared in the Sliders episode, Prophets and Loss (1998).

Quill died of cancer on September 25, 2017, at the age of 54. He is survived by his son, and predeceased by his wife Lisa Casanova Quill, who had died at age 46, seven years before of breast cancer. They were interred at Wilmington & Brandywine Cemetery in Wilmington.

== Filmography ==
| Year | Title | Role | Notes |
|---|---|---|---|
| 1987 | Hamburger Hill | Pvt. Joe Beletsky | |
| 1987 | Hiding Out | Kevin O'Roarke | |
| 1989 | Listen to Me | Garson McKellar | |
| 1989 | Staying Together | Brian McDermott | |
| 1989 | Next of Kin | T.V. Reporter | |
| 1990 | The Closer | Chet Grant | |
| 1992 | Army of Darkness (Evil Dead 3) | Blacksmith | |
| 1994 | Endangered | Billy | |
| 1997 | Touch Me | Michael | |
| 2003 | Becoming Marty | Bob | |
| 2004 | The Perfect Husband: The Laci Peterson Story | Brent Rocha | |
| 2005 | 2001 Maniacs | | |
| 2007 | A Plumm Summer | Wayne Dubois | |
| 2012 | Argo | Alan Sosa | |
