= Listen to Me (film) =

1989 film by Douglas Day Stewart

- Theatrical release poster
- Directed by: Douglas Day Stewart
- Written by: Douglas Day Stewart; Jack Cummins; Daniel Arthur Wray
- Produced by: Marykay Powell
- Starring: Kirk Cameron; Jami Gertz; Roy Scheider; Amanda Peterson; Tim Quill
- Cinematography: Fred J. Koenekamp
- Edited by: Anne V. Coates; Bud S. Smith
- Music by: David Foster
- Production company: Weintraub Entertainment Group
- Distributed by: Columbia Pictures
- Release date: May 5, 1989
- Running time: 107 minutes
- Country: United States
- Language: English
- Box office: $4,299,023

Listen to Me is a 1989 American drama film written and directed by Douglas Day Stewart. Released on May 5, 1989, it stars Kirk Cameron, Jami Gertz and Roy Scheider. The film was largely shot on location in Malibu, California, including the campus of Pepperdine University.

== Plot summary ==
A group of college students are members of the debate team at Kenmont College. Two members, Tucker Muldowney and Monica Tomanski, come from underprivileged backgrounds and have won scholarships to Kenmont for displaying exceptional talent for debating. Both students are taken under the wing of the debate-team coach, Charlie Nichols, who was a star debater in his youth. The team eventually wins a chance to debate the issue of abortion against Harvard in front of the Supreme Court. Along the way, the students learn lessons about life, love, friendship, and politics.

== Cast ==
- Kirk Cameron as Tucker Muldowney
- Jami Gertz as Monica Tomanski
- Roy Scheider as Charlie Nichols
- Amanda Peterson as Donna Lumis
- Tim Quill as Garson McKellar
- George Wyner as Dean Schwimmer
- Anthony Zerbe as Senator McKellar
- Christopher Atkins as Bruce Arlington
- Quinn Cummings as Susan Hooper
- Timothy Dang as Bobby Chin
- Peter DeLuise as Cameron Sweet
- Jason Gould as Hinkelstein
- Jon Matthews as Braithwaite
- Christopher Rydell as Tom Lloyd
- Tom Schanley as Stewart Shields
- Dan Schneider as Nathan Gore
- Yeardley Smith as Cootz
- Moon Unit Zappa as Longnecker
- Ron Masak as Mr. Tomanski
- Dottie Archibald as Mrs. Tomanski
- Rance Howard as Mr. Muldowney
- Sean Stewart as Reform School Boy
- Nancy Valen as Mia
- Julie Dretzin as Sloan
- Mark Christopher Lawrence as Attila
- Lilyan Chauvin as French Professor
- Annette Sinclair as Fountain Girl
- Anna Lee as Garson's Grandmother
- Jon Lindstrom as Television Reporter
- David Downing as Court Officer
- Don Galloway as Harvard Coach
- Martin West as Justice Blyleven
- Tricia Sheldon As Blonde Debater

== Production ==
The film was originally called Mismatch and was meant to star James Garner but he had heart surgery and was replaced by Roy Scheider. Filming started in May 1988. "It's kind of the flipside of Less than Zero," said associate producer Chuck Cooperman. "These people are our future leaders. They're just as bright, concerned and just as passionate as anyone." It was financed by the Weintraub Entertainment Group from Jerry Weintraub.

Kirk Cameron said it was easy for him to relate to his character Tucker Muldowney. "To begin with, it's a dramatic part. It's not a film about teenagers with half a brain running around drinking, dancing and partying. The characters are intelligent and responsible. They are genuinely concerned about the world we live in. It's much closer to reality than other teen pictures. It's time to show the other side of my generation, the deeper side." The film also includes the theme song "Listen to Me", which was written and produced by David Foster and Linda Thompson and recorded by Celine Dion and Warren Wiebe, sometime in 1988. The film was re-titled Talking Back when released on video in the US.

== Reception ==
The film's marketing was going to focus on Kirk Cameron, then at the height of his popularity. However Jerry Weintraub overrode them and insisted on ads that emphasized the fact the film dealt with a debate about abortion, hoping to stir up controversy. The movie was a flop at the box office. "Fans were neither angered or disturbed, they simply stayed away," wrote The Wall Street Journal.

On Rotten Tomatoes, the film holds an approval rating of 20% based on 5 reviews, with an average rating of 3.5/10. Film historian Leonard Maltin gave the picture 1.5 (out of a possible 4) stars: "After 9 years, the star and screenwriter of The Blue Lagoon reunite for this slick travesty...set on the kind of party campus where Dick Dale and the Del-Tones wouldn't be out of place. The climactic abortion debate is cheap and hokey in roughly equal measure; Kirk Cameron's shifty Oklahoma accent certainly doesn't help. See The Great Debaters instead."

== Awards and nominations ==
Award	Category	Nominee	Result
Young Artist Awards	Best Young Actor Starring in a Motion Picture	Kirk Cameron	Nominated
Political Film Society	Human Rights	Listen to Me	Nominated
Golden Raspberry Awards	Worst Supporting Actor	Christopher Atkins	Won
