= Vampire Blood =

Novel trilogy by Darren Shan

- Omnibus edition
- Cirque du Freak (2000); The Vampire's Assistant (2000); Tunnels of Blood (2000)
- Author: Darren Shan
- Country: Ireland
- Language: English/Irish
- Genre: Horror; fantasy; thriller
- Publisher: HarperCollins Children's Books (UK); Little Brown and Company (USA)
- Published: 4 January 2000 – 6 November 2000
- No. of books: 3
- Followed by: Vampire Rites

Vampire Blood (also called the Cirque du Freak trilogy) is the first trilogy in The Saga of Darren Shan by the author Darren O'Shaughnessy, under the pen name Darren Shan. It contains the books Cirque du Freak, The Vampire's Assistant and Tunnels of Blood. These starting books explore how Darren must adapt to his new life, and what that entails. The first book contains the reasons why he became a half-vampire and what he had to give up in order to save his ex-best friend, as well as introducing the character. The second and third go into more detail about how he has to change and what he will never be able to do. The main theme for the whole of the trilogy is insecurity. Darren has just been changed into something hardly anyone would accept, and this, combined with the fact that he is just a child, leads into a darker and more unusual way to grow up.

The film Cirque du Freak: The Vampire's Assistant is loosely based on this trilogy. Universal Studios bought the rights to Darren Shan and it was directed by Paul Weitz with Chris Massoglia playing the lead role of Darren Shan. The film was released on October 23, 2009.

== Synopsis ==
Darren Shan and his best friend, Steve 'Leopard' Leonard, go to see the Cirque Du Freak, where Steve realizes one of the Cirque's talents, Mr. Crepsley is a vampire. Steve asks Crepsely to blood him to become a vampire, but Crepsley refuses. Darren overhears and steals Madam Octa, Mr. Crepsley's spider, who bites Steve, poisoning him. Darren asks for an antidote in turn to be blooded by Crepsley, who agrees and curing Steve, they flee. Later, Darren is unwillingly blooded by Crepsley and their adventures begin as they set out as the Vampire and the "vampire's assistant."

== Plot ==
In Cirque Du Freak two best friends, Darren Shan, and Steve "Leopard" Leonard go to see the Cirque Du Freak, an illegal and mysterious freak show. They see many amazing events and "freaks", along with Larten Crepsley, who has a performing spider as well. Steve recognizes Mr. Crepsley as a vampire, and after telling Darren to go home without him, corners Mr. Crepsley and demands he be turned into a vampire in exchange for keeping Mr. Crepsley's identity a secret. Mr. Crepsley unwillingly tastes Steve's blood, but Mr. Crepsley says it's evil blood, and rejects Steve, who promises when he grows up, he'll kill Mr. Crepsley and become a vampire hunter. Darren, who was watching this, unbeknownst to Steve and Mr. Crepsley, tries to avoid Steve from then on, thinking Steve is really evil. A few days later, Darren goes to the Cirque Du Freak, and steals Madam Octa, Mr. Crepsley's performing spider, because of his love for spiders, and also steals a flute that controls Madam Octa. As long as Darren is playing the flute, he can control the dangerous spider. However, when Steve visits, he and Darren play with Madam Octa, who bites Steve when Darren loses concentration when his sister, Annie, comes into the room. Steve is poisoned and sent to the hospital (Darren told only Annie about Madam Octa and that she's poisonous) and the doctors can do nothing. Darren goes to Mr. Crepsley and begs him for an antidote to save his best friend, and they make a deal: Darren becomes a half vampire, and Mr. Crepsley gives him the antidote. Mr. Crepsley and Darren give Steve the antidote, and later turns Darren into a half vampire. Darren finds living his normal life as a vampire impossible, as he apparently ages much slower than normal kids and cannot control his thirst for blood, as when he accidentally attacks one of his friends and licks the blood off his scraped knee. Darren then tries living with his family, but isn't capable of this, after almost killing Annie. He returns to Mr. Crepsley. In order to avoid explaining his becoming a vampire to his family and friends; as well as not merely running away for that would keep the family in hopes he would return, Darren fakes his death. Mr. Crepsley breaks Darren's neck (which does no harm) and throws Darren off Darren's own house. Later, Mr. Crepsley unburies Darren from his coffin, and takes him to be The Vampire's Assistant, however before this happens, Steve finds out about Darren being a vampire, and tells him he'll kill "Creepy" Crepsley and Darren, along with all other vampires.

In The Vampire's Assistant Darren Shan and his vampire mentor, Mr. Crepsley, have gone back to the Cirque Du Freak, where Darren makes friends with Evra Von, a freak who has certain snake like traits. Later, Darren and Evra meet and befriend Sam Grest, and later Reggie Veggie (R.V.). R.V. is a nice, earth-loving person. However, Reggie Veggie soon learns that the freaks are feeding on animals. Darren tries to tell Mr. Tall, the circus owner, but is always interrupted and soon forgets. However, he finally tells Mr. Tall, and the Cirque moves the location, when Reggie threatens to call the police. A few days later, the Cirque is performing; Darren, however, is not performing. He goes to investigate, when he hears a noise near the wolfman's cage. Reggie is there trying to free the wolfman, whom he believes to be a trapped animal, when the wolfman bites off Reggie's hands, and kills Sam. Mr. Crepsley tells Darren that if a vampire drains a human of blood, the vampire would keep a part of the person's spirit with them. Darren willingly drinks blood for the first time to keep part of Sam's spirit alive.

In Tunnels of Blood (set in the month of December), a vampire named Gavner visits Mr. Crepsley, and soon Darren, Evra, and Mr. Crepsley travel to what later is revealed to be Mr. Crepsley's birth city. Mr. Crepsley disappears several times for what Darren and Evra presume to be business, so they act as if they are on holiday. Later, Darren is looking for a Christmas present for Evra when he meets Debbie Hemlock, a girl whom he likes, and the two soon begin dating. Darren and Evra, later, see a news report about dead bodies being found, but dry of blood; they suspect it is Mr. Crepsley and secretly follow him. Believing they are about to stop a murder, they ambush Mr. Crepsley as he was watching a man. However, it turns out the real murderer was a vampaneze (a kind of creature that is like a vampire in every way except they always kill the human they feed on, and have a purple tinge to their skin as a result of the amount of blood they drink) named Murlough, who kidnaps Evra. Mr. Crepsley and Darren set off to the sewers where Darren wanders off in a fit. He is soon kidnapped by Murlough, as a deal is made to trade with Murlough: Debbie for Evra. Later, Darren and Murlough go to Debbie's house, where Murlough mistakenly attacks what he believes to be Debbie, only to find out he was set up. Mr. Crepsley soon appears and, after a short fight, kills Murlough. It is soon revealed that Darren had drugged Debbie and her family and planned all of this with Mr. Crepsley after Murlough's demise. Before departing from Debbie forever, Darren decorates the Christmas tree in her room as he heads back to rescue Evra.
