= Vampire Rites =

2001 novel by Darren Shan

- Vampire Mountain (2001); Trials of Death (2001); The Vampire Prince (2002)
- Author: Darren Shan
- Country: Ireland
- Language: English/Irish
- Genre: Horror; fantasy; thriller
- Publisher: HarperCollins Children's Books (UK); Little Brown and Company (USA)
- Published: 4 June 2001 – 9 April 2002
- No. of books: 3
- Preceded by: Vampire Blood
- Followed by: Vampire War

Vampire Rites is the second trilogy in The Saga of Darren Shan by Darren O'Shaughnessy, under the pen name Darren Shan. It contains the books Vampire Mountain, Trials of Death and The Vampire Prince. This trilogy involves more of the various vampire characters, and their beliefs and customs (such as their views on death, life and their views of right and wrong). This trilogy's main theme is religion, compared to the previous one, it brings a whole new take on the vampire way of life and shows the kinder, better side of the vampires involved. These books show a more relaxed character of Darren Shan towards the more gruesome aspects of vampire life.

== Vampire Mountain ==
Vampire Mountain
- First edition
- Author: Darren Shan
- Language: English
- Series: The Saga of Darren Shan
- Genre: Young adult, Horror novel
- Publisher: Collins
- Publication date: 4 June 2001
- Publication place: United Kingdom
- Media type: Print (Paperback)
- Pages: 162
- ISBN: 0-00-711441-9
- OCLC: 46503993
- Preceded by: Tunnels of Blood
- Followed by: Trials of Death

Vampire Mountain is the fourth book in The Saga of Darren Shan and the first book in the Vampire Rites trilogy. It was first published by Collins in 2001 in Great Britain in 2001.

=== Plot ===
Eight years have passed since Darren Shan was "blooded" by his colleague in blood, Mr. Larten Crepsley. The Vampire Council will be gathering again soon, as it does after every 12 years, and Darren has to accompany Mr. Crepsley to the Vampire Mountain, a mountain where all the vampires share a safe haven in the mountain's caves, to be presented to the ruling committee of the Vampires - the Vampire Princes.

Six years have passed since the events in Tunnels of Blood and eight years in total in Darren's vampire life. Darren is whisked away by Mr. Crepsley to a perilous and torturous journey to the Vampire Mountain. Whilst Evra Von the Snake-Boy has grown up, and will not be accompanying Darren in his journey, Darren and Crepsley are accompanied by Mr. Desmond Tiny's two of the many workers – the Little People. One of them is Lefty, a Little Person named after his limp by Darren and Evra.

On their journey they encounter a cave which is splattered with a dead vampire's blood, Gavner Purl - a friend of Crepsley's, the blood of a dead vampaneze, and a mad bear who had been infected with vampaneze blood (hence the madness) and thus attacked Darren, who with a little help from the Little People and a pack of wolves whom he had befriended, killed the bear. After the fight, it is then revealed that Lefty, a Little Person, is actually named Harkat Mulds and can speak. He has been given the ability by Mr. Tiny to give the Vampire Princes a message about a person who will lead the vampaneze in a war against the vampires.

The company hurries on, more tense than ever, and is welcomed into Vampire Mountain by Seba Nile, Mr. Crepsley's mentor. Soon after, Darren meets a friendly and a soon-to-be Vampire Prince, Kurda Smahlt, a pacifist, a cartographer and probably the only vampire to be invested as a Prince because of his wit; Vanez Blaze, the one-eyed and caring Games Master; and Arra Sails, one of the very few female vampires, with an extraordinary sense of balance.

Soon, Darren and Crepsley attend one of the Vampire Council sessions, and it is decided, that because Larten Crepsley blooded a child for no obvious or logical reason, Darren would have to prove himself that he is worthy of being a part of the Vampire Clan by passing the Trials of Initiation or the Trials of Death - five of many tasks which a vampire must perform to show their physical strength, courage and bravery. Darren agrees to this, out of affection for Crepsley so that he may not be shamed, and also because of his own desire to prove himself. He, however, remains oblivious to the fact that the price for failing a Trial is death on stakes, until it is too late to take back his word.
