= The Hole (2009 film) =

2009 film by Joe Dante

- Theatrical release poster
- Directed by: Joe Dante
- Written by: Mark L. Smith
- Produced by: Michel Litvak; David Lancaster
- Starring: Chris Massoglia; Haley Bennett; Nathan Gamble; Bruce Dern; Teri Polo
- Cinematography: Theo van de Sande
- Edited by: Marshall Harvey
- Music by: Javier Navarrete
- Production companies: Bold Films; BenderSpink; The Hole
- Distributed by: Big Air Studios
- Release dates: September 11, 2009 (Venice); September 28, 2012 (United States)
- Running time: 92 minutes
- Country: United States
- Language: English
- Budget: $12 million
- Box office: $10.5 million

The Hole is a 2009 American 3D dark fantasy horror film directed by Joe Dante and starring Chris Massoglia, Haley Bennett, Nathan Gamble, Bruce Dern, and Teri Polo. The film follows two brothers who move into their new house with their single mother. The brothers discover a trap door in the basement and accidentally unleash a supernatural force that manifests itself into any fear of the person who looks into the hole. Critical reception was largely positive, but the film was a financial disappointment.

== Plot ==
Teenager Dane, his little brother Lucas, and their mother, Susan, move from Brooklyn to the quiet town of Benzonville, Oregon, where Dane and Lucas befriend their teenage neighbor Julie. While exploring their new home, the kids discover a trapdoor with locks in the basement. They open the trapdoor and reveal a hole that appears to be bottomless.

Over the next days, Lucas, who is afraid of clowns, finds a jester puppet in many locations, as if it is following him. Julie sees an injured girl who bleeds from the eyes. Dane sees the shadowy figure of a large man. All three see the injured girl at the boys' home and follow her into the basement, where she crawls into the hole. Julie suggests they seek help from the house's previous owner, Creepy Carl. Carl now lives in an abandoned glove factory surrounded by lights and lamps. When they mention the hole, Carl berates them for releasing the evil inside and says that it will kill Dane. Later that night, Carl scribbles in a sketchbook. He screams, "I'm not done yet!" as the light bulbs around him pop. Dane returns to the factory for the sketchbook, which is his, and does not find Carl.

Julie invites the group to use her pool. While underwater, Dane sees the figure of a giant man above. He and Julie follow a trail of muddy footprints, leaving Lucas alone in the pool. After hearing Julie's dog barking, they return to see Lucas drowning. Lucas says that the puppet pulled him under. That night, Dane sees a hand-shaped bruise on Lucas's leg, identical to a hand that Carl drew in the sketchbook. While flipping through the sketchbook, he realizes each page is a puzzle piece and starts working on them. He hears whistling and enters the kitchen to find an envelope addressed to him from the New Jersey State Penitentiary. The note inside reads 'HELLO BOY'.

Lucas sees a policeman at the bottom of the stairs. The cop has a picture of two girls and asks if he has seen one of them, the girl whom Julie encountered. The cop leaves the picture with Lucas and turns to go. The back of his head is missing. Lucas and Dane watch the cop go to the basement and climb into the hole.

The girl appears in Julie's room. Julie leaves and meets the boys. She and her best friend, Annie, were playing on the tracks of an old roller coaster, which resulted in Annie's death. While attempting to help Julie, an officer also fell to his death. Julie decides to return to the amusement park where the accident occurred; Dane follows her, leaving Lucas alone. Julie finds Annie sitting on the spot from which she fell. After Julie convinces Annie that she tried to save her, Annie disappears. Lucas hears Dane calling him to the basement. Confused, he follows the voice to find the puppet mimicking Dane. The puppet attacks him, but is destroyed. Dane and Julie return, and Lucas announces that he is no longer afraid of clowns. Dane theorizes that when one looks into the hole, it creates whatever the person is afraid of. He claims he is not afraid of anything.

Julie invites them to stay over for the night. As Lucas gathers his things, Dane shows Julie the puzzle. They solve it together and see a boy being grabbed by a giant man. Dane rushes upstairs, but Lucas is gone. Dane reveals that he is afraid of his father, who abused the family and is now in prison. Realizing that a monstrous version of his father has taken Lucas into the hole, Dane jumps in as well. Dane finds Lucas hiding in the closet of a twisted version of their old home. Their father, who became a giant, starts to break through the door. The shelving appears to be a ladder. Lucas starts climbing and Dane follows, but their father drags him back down. As Dane fights him, the father returns to his actual size as Dane confronts his fear. The surroundings begin to crumble and the floor falls away, leaving Dane and his father trapped on an island below a ceiling fan. Dane pulls himself onto the fan with a belt and gives the floor one final blow with the belt buckle, sending the father plummeting into a void.

Dane emerges where Julie and Lucas are waiting. They close the hole as Susan comes into the basement. She sees the trapdoor and opens it, revealing a shallow crawl space. As they head upstairs, Lucas asks if Susan is afraid of anything. She replies that she was afraid of a monster under her bed. The trapdoor blows open again.

== Cast ==
- Chris Massoglia as Dane Thompson
- Haley Bennett as Julie Campbell
- Nathan Gamble as Lucas Thompson
- Teri Polo as Susan Thompson
- Bruce Dern as Creepy Carl
- Quinn Lord as Annie Smith
- John DeSantis as Monster Dad
- Doug Chapman as Normal Dad
- Mark Pawson as Travis
- Peter Shinkoda as Young Cop
- Jonathan Bruce as Mover
- Merritt Patterson as Jessica
- Ali Cobrin as Tiffany
- Chelsea Ricketts as Whitney
- Chord Overstreet as Adam
- Wade Williams as Monster Dad Voice
- Mary Mouser as Annie Voice
- Jessica Just as Pool Girl (uncredited)
- Dick Miller as Pizza Delivery Guy (uncredited)

== Production ==
In August 2007, it was announced Mark L. Smith had sold his script, The Hole, to be produced by Bold Films and BenderSpink.

The film began shooting in 3D on December 5, 2008, in Vancouver, Canada.

== Release ==
The Hole had its world premiere at the 66th Venice International Film Festival on September 11, 2009. It was screened at the 2009 Toronto International Film Festival the following day, and later at the 2010 Cannes Film Festival.

The film was first released theatrically in Thailand on May 5, 2010. It had its United States debut screening at the Castro Theatre in San Francisco on October 7, 2011. The Hole was released in 3D in select theatres in Los Angeles and Atlanta on September 28, 2012, and was made available on DVD, Blu-ray, and video on demand (VOD) on October 2, 2012.

== Reception ==
The film garnered positive reviews from critics. Film review aggregator Rotten Tomatoes reports that 81% of critics gave the film a positive review, based on 36 reviews, with a rating average of 6.4 out of 10. The site's consensus reads, "A welcome throwback to the suburban teen thrillers of the 1980s, The Hole is a scary, enjoyable return to form for director Joe Dante."
