= Jessica Carlson =

American actress from New York City

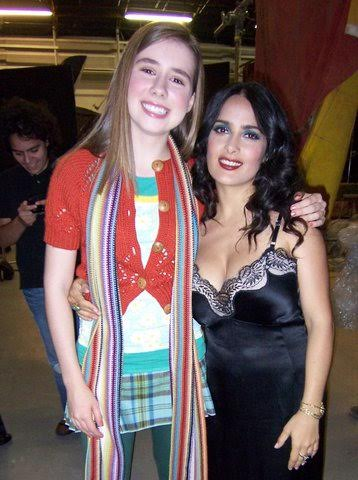
Carlson and Hayek while shooting Universal Studio's Cirque du Freak: The Vampire's Assistant in 2009

Jessica Carlson (born c. 1993) is an American actress from New York City, known for her role as Rebecca in the Universal's Cirque du Freak: The Vampire's Assistant.

== Career ==
Besides Cirque du Freak, Carlson has been in "Wonder of the World" and Blue Dress, The Life Before Her Eyes, Goyta, the Law & Order episode "Angelgrove", and The Big C episode "Blue-Eyed Iris". She played Laurie in an equity production of Brighton Beach Memoirs at the Emelin theater in Larchmont. Carlson also played Liesel Meminger in a "movie trailer" for the novel The Book Thief at the Teen Book Video Awards.

For her role in Cirque du Freak, Carlson won Best Supporting Actress in a Feature Film at the 2010 Young Artist Awards.

She attended Wesleyan University and The New School.

== Film and TV ==
- Blue Dress
- Goyta
- The Life Before Her Eyes
- Law & Order
- Cirque du Freak: The Vampire's Assistant
- The Big C
- A Future to Hold
- The Man in the Woods
