= A Plumm Summer =

Adventure-family film directed by Caroline Zelder

- Promotional poster
- Directed by: Caroline Zelder
- Written by: T. J. Lynch; Frank Antonelli; Catherine Zelder
- Produced by: Frank Antonelli; Catherine Zelder
- Starring: William Baldwin; Henry Winkler; Lisa Guerrero; Brenda Strong; Owen Peare; Morgan Flynn; Peter Scolari; Rick Overton; Tim Quill; Chris J. Kelly
- Narrated by: Jeff Daniels
- Cinematography: Mark Vargo
- Edited by: Jonathan Lucas
- Music by: Tom Heil
- Production companies: Home Team Productions; Fairplay Pictures
- Distributed by: Freestyle Releasing
- Release dates: October 14, 2007 (Austin); April 20, 2008 (United States)
- Country: United States
- Language: English
- Budget: $5 million

A Plumm Summer is a 2007 American independent adventure family film directed by Caroline Zelder. It stars Owen Pearce, Chris Massoglia (appearing under the name "Chris J. Kelly"), Morgan Flynn, William Baldwin, Henry Winkler, and Lisa Guerrero, and is narrated by Jeff Daniels. The film follows a teenage boy, his young brother, and a new-to-town teenage girl as they try to find a marionette from a local television show which has been stolen and held for ransom. Meanwhile, the brothers' father struggles with alcoholism and their mother tries to hold her marriage together.

== Plot ==
The film is based on a real event that occurred in 1968 in Billings, Montana, the hometown of screenwriter T. J. Lynch.

A popular locally produced children's television show, Happy Herb & Froggy Doo, features magician Happy Herb (Henry Winkler) and his wisecracking marionette sidekick, Froggy Doo. Froggy Doo is stolen and held for ransom, and the Federal Bureau of Investigation (FBI) is called in to investigate. Elliott Plumm (Chris J. Kelly) used to watch the show, but now feels he is too grown up to do so any longer. His five-year-old brother, Rocky, is a Froggy Doo fan, however. Their father, Mick Plumm (William Baldwin), is a recovering alcoholic and unemployed ex-boxer who believes Elliott's birth prevented him from going to the Olympic Games 12 years earlier. Mick's emotionally distant relationship with Elliott is causing Elliott to become emotionally troubled. Their mother, Roxie Plumm (Lisa Guerrero), is the only breadwinner in the family, and keeping her husband sober and attending to her job means she has little time for her children.

Elliott shows little interest in the kidnapping. Shortly thereafter, however, Haley Dubois (Morgan Flynn) and her father arrive in their run-down mobile home and move in next door. Haley's father is the new deputy sheriff in town, and Haley is entranced by the mystery surrounding the kidnapping of Froggy Doo. Elliott quickly begins to fall in love with Haley, and soon he agrees to help Haley and Rocky find Froggy Doo in order to win Haley's heart. The three kids have to find the marionette before the two bumbling FBI agents, Hardigan (Peter Scolari) and Brinkman (Rick Overton) can do so. Elliott, Haley, and Rocky's list of suspects include the local bully, a store clerk, and Happy Herb's wife Viv (Brenda Strong). As the kids pursue the case, Elliott and Rocky's brotherly bond strengthens, and Elliott realizes he might not only win back the love of his father but provide his family with the substantial reward money and help his parents' marriage, too.

== Cast ==
- William Baldwin as Mick Plumm
- Henry Winkler as Happy Herb McAllister and the voice of Froggy Doo
- Lisa Guerrero as Roxie Plumm
- Chris Massoglia as Elliott Plumm
- Owen Pearce as Rocky Plumm
- Morgan Flynn as Haley Dubois
- Brenda Strong as Viv McAllister
- Tim Quill as Wayne Dubois
- Peter Scolari as Agent Hardigan
- Rick Overton as Agent Brinkman
- Richard Riehle as Art Bublin
- Clint Howard as Binky the Clown
- Jeff Daniels as The Narrator

== Production ==
T.J. Lynch grew up in Billings, where the real-life Happy Herb and Froggy Doo show originated, and watched the show as a child. Lynch used the kidnapping of Froggy Doo as the basis for a screenplay, and interviewed Herb McAllister (the actor who played Happy Herb and provided Froggy Doo's voice) to gain background information for the script. Lynch and McAllister agreed to a contract which gave exclusive story rights to Lynch and permitted the use of the original Froggy Doo character design in the final film. Lynch contacted Caroline Zelder, a director/producer friend of his, and Zelder agreed to produce the film. Work on the script took roughly two-and-a-half to three years.

The budget was initially set at $3.5 million. A foreign film financing company agreed to provide financial backing for the picture, but pulled out just weeks after casting of the major leads was complete. Actor Lisa Guerrero and Scott Erickson (Guerrero's husband) formed Home Team Productions and partnered with Zelder and producer Frank Antonelli's company, Fairplay Pictures, to finance the film. Guerrero and her husband received executive producer credit on the film. The film was Guerrero's first film role. Erickson pitched the final game of his baseball career at Yankee Stadium in New York City, boarded a plane, and was producing the film just days later. Montana Governor Brian Schweitzer had a small role in the film as Sheriff Strunk. The real-life "Happy Herb," Herb McAllister, also had a cameo role in the film.

The producers considered several states in the United States as well as locations in Canada for the production, but chose Montana over South Carolina after receiving support from the governor, state financial incentives, and encouragement from freelance movie production workers in the state. The picture was Zelder's first as a director. Filming began in July 2006, and lasted 35 days. The production was filmed in and around Bozeman and Livingston.

== Release ==
A Plumm Summer screened at a number of film festivals around the world (including the Heartland Film Festival and Chicago International Children's Film Festival) and won several awards, but the picture was unable to find a major American studio willing to release the family-friendly film. Fairplay Pictures eventually self-distributed the picture on 58 screens in 10 cities in the United States on April 20, 2008. Cities in the limited release included Minneapolis-St. Paul, Los Angeles, Birmingham, and some towns in Montana. The film's opening weekend box office receipts totalled $60,668, a "thin" $1,046 per venue.

Nonetheless, the self-distribution strategy led several major motion picture companies to express interest in releasing the film on DVD. Paramount Pictures won the right to do so, and released the DVD in North America on May 5, 2009.

A sequel, A Plumm Summer Adventure, and possibly a third "Plumm" movie were planned.

== Critical reception ==
Critics gave the film very mixed reviews. The Hollywood Reporter wrote, "This family film is willing to tackle important issues such as burgeoning sexuality, alcoholism and a troubled home life but does so in a bland and unconvincing story." However, the film's technical qualities were praised. Both The Hollywood Reporter and the St. Paul Pioneer Press felt the story was slow and contrived. The Los Angeles Times called the film flawed, and placed the blame squarely on the screenplay for not knowing whether to depict a Disney-esque innocent adventure or a real world that confronted a teenager's emerging sexuality, a father's alcoholism, and the break-up of a marriage. The Deseret News called the film "hokey" and felt the direction and some of the performances were amateurish. The newspaper labeled the score as "one of the worst musical scores in recent memory", and felt the period songs were "ill-chosen". The Minneapolis Star Tribune was particularly harsh in its criticism. The newspaper felt the picture was "insulting to your child's intelligence, veer[ed] wildly between broad humor (and I should mention that there is literally not one funny scene in this whole movie), sugary nostalgia and the worst melodrama", and "fraught with leaden direction and horrible acting".

Variety gave a much more positive review. The industry trade journal called Owen Pearce's performance "scene-stealing," and felt all the performances were "at a very high level across the board." The magazine also praised Zelder's direction: "[A]ction, comedy and a touch of sweetness... [are] exactly what distinguishes Caroline Zelder's debut feature.... Zelder has a way of imbuing even the smallest gestures -- like a teenager's slump or a 5-year-old's intractable stare -- with meaning." Variety also gave high marks to the film's technical production. "Lenser Mark Vargo bathes the Montana locations in glorious natural light; Alan Muraoka's production design and Nola Roller's costumes mostly nail the 1968 aesthetic, but could have been even more consistent."
