= Kathleen S. Dunn =

American dialect-acting coach

Kathleen S. Dunn is an American certified dialect coach, accent reduction coach, voice and body movement instructor, and professional actress.

== Background ==
Prior to dialect coaching, Dunn assisted casting director Mali Finn on numerous feature films, as well as apprenticing in the capacity of screen test reader. Dunn is a professional TV/film/stage actress starting in 1987. Her credits include leading roles in the films Cold Intelligence (2004) with Michael Denney, The Joyriders (1999) with Martin Landau, and Fish, a Project Greenlight film and a short film Tilly. Theatre companies in Los Angeles where Kathy Dunn performed since 1987 include: The Los Angeles Women's Shakespeare Company; Evidence Room; Odyssey Theatre; Workshop 360 and Los Angeles Theatre Company. Her stage performances have won her numerous awards in the Los Angeles Area. Actors such as Robert Easton (past) and Kathleen S Dunn (current) have had their career start in Dialect Coaching & Accent Reduction at the School of Theatre at the University of Southern California (USC).

== Dialects theory ==
Kathleen Dunn is most known for "uniting voice, body and imagination" in coaching and her Dialects Theory of providing the "Ears of the Actor".

== Dialect coaching for film ==
Dunn's approach as a dialect coach considers all regional and non-regional accent needs as well as the integration of voice/body movement and Lessac theories into accent and dialect training.
