= Lisa Guerrero =

American journalist (born 1964)

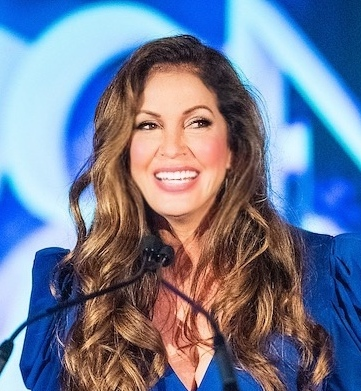
- Guerrero in 2019
- Born: Lisa Marie Coles; April 9, 1964 (age 62); Chicago, Illinois, U.S.
- Occupations: Journalist; actress; sportscaster; artist; model
- Spouses: Scott Erickson (m. 2004; div. 2019); David Sheriff (m. 2025)
- Website: lisaguerrero.com

Lisa Marie Guerrero (born Lisa Marie Coles; April 9, 1964) is an American journalist, actress, former sportscaster, artist, and model. From 2006 to 2025, Guerrero was an investigative correspondent for the nationally syndicated newsmagazine Inside Edition.

== Early years ==
Guerrero was born Lisa Coles on April 9, 1964, in Chicago, Illinois, to Walter Coles, an American of English descent, and Lucy Guerrero-Coles, who was from Chile. Guerrero spent her childhood living in San Diego, California, and Huntington Beach, California. In 1972, when Guerrero was eight, her mother died of lymphoma cancer. Lisa is a graduate of Edison High School in Huntington Beach, California which is located in Orange County.

== Career ==
=== Early career and acting roles ===
Guerrero began her show business career in the 1980s as a cheerleader for the Los Angeles Rams, after which she became entertainment director for the Atlanta Falcons and New England Patriots. In the 1990s, she starred in Aaron Spelling's Sunset Beach as the female jewel thief Francesca Vargas. She also guest-starred on Frasier (as Joanne, the woman Frasier meets in the airport and follows onto a plane in the Season 4 finale "Odd Man Out" and Season 5 premiere "Frasier's Imaginary Friend"), Cybill, George Lopez and In the Heat of the Night.

In 1992, Guerrero, billed under her given name Lisa Coles, made a brief appearance in the superhero film Batman Returns. Guerrero's character, credited as "Volunteer Bimbo", tells the film's villain, Penguin (Danny DeVito), that he is the coolest role model a young person could have. The Penguin retorted by saying that she's the hottest young person a role model could have.

In 1997, she became a sports anchor on Los Angeles' KCBS-TV, and later on KTTV.

=== Fox Sports ===
In 1999, Lisa Guerrero moved to the Fox Network, where she participated in shows such as Sports Geniuses, Fox Overtime, Fox Extra Innings, and the Toughman competition shows. Guerrero travelled to Egypt to tape the special Opening the Tombs of the Golden Mummies, and was the first female host of the San Diego Chargers magazine-style television show. Guerrero also co-hosted The Best Damn Sports Show Period, alongside Tom Arnold, John Salley, John Kruk and Michael Irvin.

=== Monday Night Football ===
In 2003, she left The Best Damn Sports Show Period to join ABC's Monday Night Football as a sideline reporter. Guerrero was fired from the Monday Night Football team after one season. Two decades later, Guerrero revealed in her book that she had suffered a miscarriage while on the air at MNF.

=== Playboy ===
Guerrero was the celebrity cover model in the January 2006 issue of Playboy magazine, billed on the cover as "The Best Damn Sports Beauty".

Fifteen years later, Guerrero hosted the Secrets of Playboy. The show won the Critics Choice Award for Best Crime and Justice Show in 2022. Her in-studio sit down interviews with the survivors earned critical praise.

=== Inside Edition ===
On June 15, 2006, Guerrero became a correspondent on the TV news magazine Inside Edition. She later became the show's chief investigative correspondent and has worked on undercover stories and investigative reports. In 2011, she won the National Headliner Award for Best Investigative Report, beating Anderson Cooper for her undercover exposé on air duct cleaning scams.

Guerrero was nominated for a Prism Award for her story on the dangers of alcohol and boating. She was also nominated for a Genesis Award nomination for her investigation into horse slaughter farms in Florida.

In total, Guerrero has won over 35 national journalism awards and honors since becoming Inside Edition's chief investigative correspondent in 2010.

In June 2025, Guerrero announced her departure from the program, stating that she had opted not to renew her contract.

=== Acting ===
Guerrero has appeared in numerous TV and film projects throughout her forty-year career, including a starring role in Aaron Spelling's Sunset Beach, guest starring on Frasier, The George Lopez Show, In the Heat of the Night, and a recurring role in TNT's television drama series Southland. She appeared in Batman Returns and was also featured in the Bennet Miller film Moneyball, starring Brad Pitt.

Guerrero and her then-husband, retired baseball pitcher Scott Erickson, made an independent film titled A Plumm Summer (2007). Guerrero played the lead role and was also credited as executive producer. Guerrero also co-hosted VH1's game show The World Series of Pop Culture. In 2010, Guerrero hosted the first live webcast of the 82nd Academy Awards red carpet for Oscar.com, integrating viewers' questions from Facebook into celebrity interviews. In January 2012, Guerrero hosted Shooting Stars: Salute to Service, a reality competition show on the Velocity channel.

In total, Guerrero has appeared in 18 film and television projects.

=== Author ===
Guerrero wrote a memoir titled Warrior: My Path to Being Brave which was published by Hachette Books in January 2023.

Guerrero previously wrote the book, Jewelry For Your Table, a how-to crafts treatise on table setting, published in 2016.

She has occasionally written a blog for the Los Angeles Times sports section and HuffPost.

== Personal life ==
On December 5, 2025 Lisa Guerrero married Parasound CEO, Air Force Academy Graduate, and former fighter pilot David Sheriff in a private ceremony in Southern California. Guerrero was married to Scott Erickson from 2004 through 2019. In her 2023 book, Warrior, Guerrero revealed that an unplanned pregnancy early in her relationship with Erickson ended in a miscarriage, suffered while she was on the sideline reporting for Monday Night Football.

== Filmography ==
=== Television ===
Year	Title	Role	Notes
1994	Extra	Co-anchor	
1994	Wild West Showdown		
2000	Sexiest Bachelor in America Pageant	Co-host	
2000	Southern California Sports Report	Host	
2000	Sports Geniuses	Co-host	
2001–2002	The Best Damn Sports Show Period		
2003	Monday Night Football	Sideline reporter	16 episodes
2003	Jimmy Kimmel Live!		1 episode
2005	Weekends at the DL		1 episode
2005	Madden NFL 2006	Voice	Video game
2005	Beyond the Glory		1 episode
2006	World Series of Pop Culture	Commentator	8 episodes
2006	The Big Idea with Donny Deutsch		1 episode
2007–2008	Inside Edition	West Coast correspondent	
2008–present	Headline News	Guest	
2008–present	E! News	Guest	
2009	E! True Hollywood Story		1 episode
2009–2025	Inside Edition	Chief investigative correspondent	
2010	The John and Ken Show	Guest	
2010	Dr. Phil	Guest	
2010	Live From the Red Carpet: 82nd Academy Awards Oscar.com	Host	
2012	Shooting Stars: Salute to Service	Host	
2014	Hell's Kitchen	Dining room guest	
2022	Secrets of Playboy	Host	

=== Film and television acting ===
Year	Title	Role	Notes
1990	In the Heat of the Night		1 episode
1991	Matlock		
1992	Batman Returns		
1992	Love Potion No. 9		
1994	Seinfeld		1 episode
1996	Cybill		1 episode
1997	Fire Down Below		
1997	Frasier		2 episodes
1998–1999	Sunset Beach	Francesca Vargas	86 episodes
2003	George Lopez	Linda Lorenzo	"Feel the Burn"
2005	Today You Die		
2007	A Plumm Summer		
2008	Winged Creatures		
2010	Victorious		Pilot
2010–2011	Southland		
2011	Moneyball		

=== Producer ===
Year	Title	Notes
2007	A Plumm Summer	

== Books ==
- Guerrero, Lisa (November 28, 2016). Jewelry for Your Table: How to Make One-of-a-Kind Napkin Rings From Vintage Pieces. Schiffer Craft. ISBN 978-0-764-35249-2.
- Guerrero, Lisa (January 24, 2023). Warrior: My Path to Being Brave. Hachette Books. ISBN 978-0-306-82949-9.
