= Chris Massoglia =

American actor

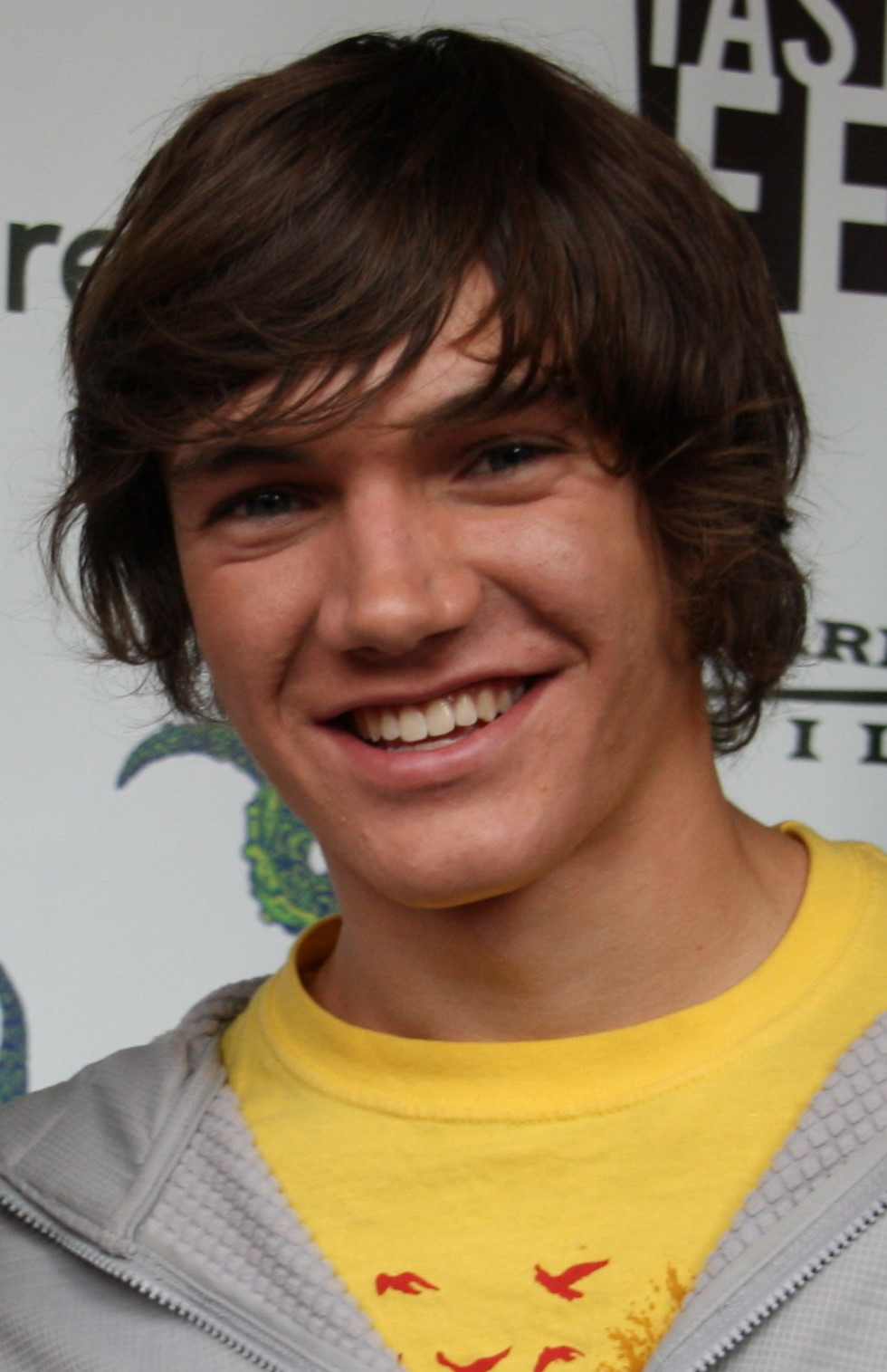
- Massoglia at the premiere of Cirque du Freak: The Vampire's Assistant, 2009

Member of the Blaine City Council from the 3rd ward
- Incumbent
- Assumed office January 4, 2021
- Preceded by: Andy Garvais

Personal details
- Born: Christopher Paul Massoglia; March 29, 1992 (age 34) Minneapolis, Minnesota, U.S.
- Spouse: Shauna Massoglia
- Children: 2
- Occupation: Actor, Politician
- Website: https://www.chrismassoglia.com/

Christopher Paul Massoglia (born March 29, 1992) is an American actor and a city council member for Blaine, Minnesota.

== Early life ==
Chris Massoglia was born in Minneapolis, Minnesota, to Christopher and Karen Massoglia. His father is a chiropractor and his mother a homemaker. His parents are devout Christians and Republicans, and Massoglia grew up a fan of Christian pop music (as well as unable to listen to rap music). Massoglia was homeschooled by his mother. By the age of 13, he had enrolled in an online university where his coursework included developmental psychology, Biblical studies, algebra, and American history. He also had studied jujitsu, played piano, trained as a hip-hop dancer, knew American sign language, and rode horses. He was also a stand-out Little League Baseball player.

== Acting career ==
Massoglia began attending acting workshops at a dancing academy, Lundstrum Performing Arts, in his home town of Minneapolis while in middle school, and auditioning for television commercials by creating home-made audition tapes. His first jobs included commercials for Target, Marshall Field's, PepsiCo and Best Buy.

He began acting in 2003 under the name "Chris Kelly" (sometimes as "Chris J. Kelly") in an episode of Law & Order: Criminal Intent. The same year, he was considered for the part of 10 year old Sean in the Nicole Kidman film Birth, but his family refused to allow him to appear naked on screen with a nude, grown woman. He auditioned for Spider-Man 2 (getting far enough in the casting process to spend an afternoon with Tobey Maguire) and Bad News Bears (he returned six times for call-backs but was not cast). He spent summer 2004 away from auditions to play Little League Baseball; his team (the Robbinsdale All-Stars) won the Minnesota state title that year but did not go to the World Series after losing the Indianapolis regionals. He appeared in two episodes of Medical Investigation in 2004, and four episodes of the TNT cable television police drama Wanted in 2005. He began using his family name of Massoglia in 2008.

He made his feature film acting debut in 2007's A Plumm Summer, but his most prominent role as of 2009 was as Darren Shan in the 2009 film Cirque du Freak: The Vampire's Assistant. Originally scheduled to debut theatrically in 2010, the film was moved to October 2009 to "capitalize on the Halloween season", and opened a month prior to another highly anticipated vampire picture, The Twilight Saga: New Moon.

His follow-up project was the 3-D horror film The Hole, directed by Joe Dante, He went on to play the elder incarnation of Sam, Zac Efron's brother in Charlie St. Cloud, but his role was cut.

After a four-year break, Massoglia returned to the acting. His first notable work was in The Matchbreaker (2016), in which he had a minor role. This was followed by the small film Because of Gràcia, in which he starred as a teenage boy trying to build a relationship with a chaste girl who refuses to kiss until she's married. In the fall 2017, Massoglia began filming the small independent film The Lumber Baron.

Massoglia wrote, directed and starred in the short film Playball, released online in 2018.

As of November 2009, critiques of Massoglia's acting have concerned his leading role in Cirque du Freak: The Vampire's Assistant. His performance has not won raves; motion picture industry trade publication Variety said, "The production puts far too much faith in the appeal of newcomer Chris Massoglia, who plays Darren Shan, a rule-abiding, good-grade-earning conformist with the shaggy coif and bland, gumdrop charm of your average Nickelodeon character." The Boston Globe called his acting "too bland to deliver." However, reviewing his 2009 film The Hole, The Hollywood Reporter called Massoglia "a young Zac Efron... who ably carries the film."

== Political career ==
After winning election in 2020, Massoglia became a member of the Blaine, Minnesota City Council from Blaine's 3rd Ward in January 2021. He stood on the policies of not implementing a city sales tax, making sure that there were more firemen and that a new fire station was built, more transparency in government, and smart sustainable growth in Blaine.

== Filmography ==
=== Film ===
| Year | Title | Role | Notes |
|---|---|---|---|
| 2007 | A Plumm Summer | Elliott Plumm | |
| 2009 | The Hole | Dane Thompson | |
| 2009 | Cirque du Freak: The Vampire's Assistant | Darren Shan | |
| 2016 | The Matchbreaker | Zach | |
| 2017 | Because of Gràcia | Chase Morgan | |
| 2018 | Playball | Son (Adult) | Short film; also writer and director |
| 2019 | The Protectors | Wesley | |
| 2024 | Reagan | Pat Boone | |

=== Television ===
| Year | Title | Role | Notes |
|---|---|---|---|
| 2003 | Law & Order: Criminal Intent | Sam Connors | Episode: "Happy Family" |
| 2004 | Medical Investigation | Jack Connor | Episode: "You're Not Alone"; Episode: "Coming Home" |
| 2005 | Wanted | Tony Rose | 4 episodes |
| 2006 | Boys Life | Tom Porter | |
| 2013 | Our Wild Hearts | Ryan | TV movie |
